= The Hunchback of Notre Dame (franchise) =

Media franchise

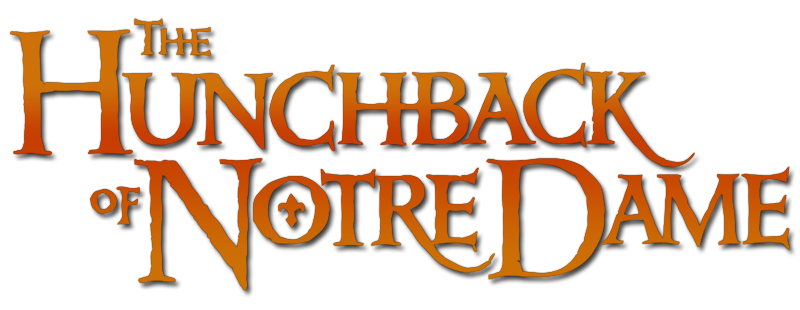
- Logo of the 1996 Disney animated film
- Original work: The Hunchback of Notre Dame (1996)
- Owner: The Walt Disney Company
- Years: 1996–present
- Based on: The Hunchback of Notre-Dame by Victor Hugo

Films and television
- Film: The Hunchback of Notre Dame (1996)
- Direct-to-video: The Hunchback of Notre Dame II (2002)

Theatrical presentations
- Musical: The Hunchback of Notre Dame (1999)

Games
- Video games: The Hunchback of Notre Dame: Topsy Turvy Games (1996); Disney's Animated Storybook: The Hunchback of Notre Dame (1996); Kingdom Hearts 3D: Dream Drop Distance (2012)^{*}

Audio
- Soundtracks: The Hunchback of Notre Dame (1996); The Hunchback of Notre Dame: A New Musical (2016)
- Original music: "The Bells of Notre Dame"; "Out There"; "Topsy Turvy"; "God Help the Outcasts"; "Heaven's Light"; "Hellfire"; "A Guy Like You"; "Someday"

Miscellaneous
- Theme park attraction: Festival of Fools (1996–1998)
- ^{*} Work where this franchise's characters or settings appeared as part of a crossover.

The Hunchback of Notre Dame is a Disney media franchise, commencing in 1996 with the release of The Hunchback of Notre Dame. The franchise is based on the 1831 novel with the same name by Victor Hugo.

== Films ==
=== The Hunchback of Notre Dame ===
The Hunchback of Notre Dame is a 1996 American animated musical drama film produced by Walt Disney Animation Studios and released to theaters on June 21, 1996, by Walt Disney Pictures. The film is based on Victor Hugo's 1831 novel The Hunchback of Notre-Dame. The plot centers on Quasimodo, the deformed bell-ringer of Notre-Dame, and his struggle to gain acceptance into society while rebelling against his ruthless and bigoted master, Judge Claude Frollo.

=== The Hunchback of Notre Dame II ===
The Hunchback of Notre Dame II is a 2002 American animated romantic musical comedy-drama film and a direct-to-video sequel to the 1996 Disney animated film The Hunchback of Notre Dame. It was produced by Walt Disney Animation Japan. Some years after the events of the first film, Quasimodo is pitted against a group of circus thieves led by the narcissistic Sarousch, while falls in love with one of their workers, Madellaine.

=== Live-action remake ===
A live-action remake of The Hunchback of Notre Dame was announced in January 2019. The script will be penned by David Henry Hwang with Menken and Schwartz returning to write the music. Josh Gad is set to produce and is possibly considered to play Quasimodo.

In 2023, Menken suggested that development on the live-action remake was stalled owing to the original film's content and themes, commenting that "the Hunchback movie, Hunchback story involves a lot of real, real issues that are important issues and should be explored to be discussed. And there has to be an agreement about how we deal with those issues. You know, do we do a Hunchback without 'Hellfire'? I don't think so ... So it sits in this limbo right now".

== Stage musical ==
=== The Hunchback of Notre Dame (Der Glöckner von Notre Dame) ===
The Hunchback of Notre Dame is a musical based on the 1996 Disney film of the same name, which in turn was inspired by the 1831 Victor Hugo novel of the same name. It has music by Alan Menken, lyrics by Stephen Schwartz, and book by James Lapine. The musical premiered in 1999 in Berlin, Germany as Der Glöckner von Notre Dame (literally translated in English, The Bellringer of Notre Dame). It was produced by Walt Disney Theatrical, the company's first musical to premiere outside the U.S. It ran for three years, becoming one of Berlin's longest-running musicals. A significantly revised version of the musical, with a new book by Peter Parnell, premiered at the La Jolla Playhouse in San Diego, California in 2014. Both versions of the musical restore Victor Hugo's darker ending and are in general closer to the tone of the novel.

==== The Hunchback of Notre Dame studio cast recording ====
The Hunchback of Notre Dame: A New Musical is a 2016 studio cast recording of the 2015 Paper Mill Playhouse production of Hunchback. It was released by Sh-K-Boom/Ghostlight Records.

Unprecedented for a non-Broadway cast recording, the album sold 10,000 copies, hitting No. 1 on the Cast Albums chart, No. 17 on Top Album Sales, and No. 47 on the Billboard 200 chart.

== Theme park attractions ==
=== Festival of Fools ===
Festival of Fools commenced in 1996 and held its last show on April 18, 1998. LaughingPlace cited a review of the final show that said: "In the pantheon of great Disneyland parades and shows, the Festival of Fools resides in the top echelon. It operated on so many levels (history, humor, and heart felt emotion to name a few), stirred a passion seldom seen among its most faithful (of which I am no doubt one), and brought 1239 fun filled energetic performances to the wondrous eyes of children young and old, that it's very difficult to sum up the run or my feelings toward it".

== Video games ==
=== The Hunchback of Notre Dame: Topsy Turvy Games ===
In 1996, to tie in with the original theatrical release, The Hunchback of Notre Dame: Topsy Turvy Games was released by Disney Interactive for Windows and Game Boy, which is a collection of mini games based around the Festival of Fools that includes a variation of Balloon Fight.

=== Disney's Animated Storybook: The Hunchback of Notre Dame ===
Disney's Animated Storybook: The Hunchback of Notre Dame is a point-and-click video game released by Disney Interactive for the PC. It retells the film's plot in an abridged animated storybook form.

=== Kingdom Hearts 3D: Dream Drop Distance ===
A world based on The Hunchback of Notre Dame, La Cité des Cloches (The City of Bells), made its debut appearance in the Kingdom Hearts series in Kingdom Hearts 3D: Dream Drop Distance. It was the first new Disney world confirmed for the game. Quasimodo, Esmeralda, Phoebus, Claude Frollo and the three gargoyles appear as characters in the world.

=== Disney Magic Kingdoms ===
The world builder video game Disney Magic Kingdoms, during a limited time Event based on The Hunchback of Notre Dame, introduced Quasimodo, Esmeralda, Phoebus, Claude Frollo and Djali as playable characters, as well as Bells of Notre Dame and Clopin's Puppet Wagon as attractions, in a storyline serving as a continuation after the events in the film.

== Music ==
=== Soundtrack ===
The Hunchback of Notre Dame: An Original Walt Disney Records Soundtrack is the soundtrack to the 1996 Disney animated feature film, The Hunchback of Notre Dame. It includes songs written by Alan Menken and Stephen Schwartz with vocals performed by Paul Kandel, David Ogden Stiers, Tony Jay, Tom Hulce, Heidi Mollenhauer, Jason Alexander, Mary Wickes, and Mary Stout, along with singles by All-4-One/Eternal, and the film's score composed by Alan Menken:

- "The Bells of Notre Dame"
- "Out There"
- "Topsy Turvy"
- "God Help the Outcasts"
- "Heaven's Light"
- "Hellfire"
- "A Guy Like You"
- "Someday"
