= Claude Frollo (Disney character) =

Disney villain character

Judge Claude Frollo
- Disney's The Hunchback of Notre Dame character
- First appearance: The Hunchback of Notre Dame (1996)
- Based on: Claude Frollo by Victor Hugo
- Adapted by: Tab Murphy
- Voiced by: Tony Jay (1996–2006); Corey Burton (Kingdom Hearts 3D: Dream Drop Distance; 2012–Present)
- Portrayed by: Norbert Lamla (1999 musical); Patrick Page (2014 musical)

In-universe information
- Full name: Claude Frollo
- Gender: Male
- Occupation: Judge; Minister of Justice
- Family: Jehan Frollo (younger brother; 2014 musical)
- Children: Quasimodo (adoptive son); Claudine Frollo (daughter; Descendants)
- Religion: Roman Catholic
- Nationality: French

Judge Claude Frollo is a fictional character in Disney's 34th animated film, The Hunchback of Notre Dame (1996). He was based on Archdeacon Claude Frollo from Victor Hugo's 1831 novel. Frollo is widely considered by critics and audiences to be one of Disney's cruelest and most ruthless villains, due to using religion to justify murder and other violent acts that are shown throughout the film.

As well as the movie, Frollo has made multiple small appearances in other Disney franchises, including the musical adaptation for the stage.

== Personality ==
Frollo is portrayed in the Disney film as the ruthless, fanatically religious French Minister of Justice. He views the world and everyone in it (except for himself) as corrupt and sinful, and reserves particular hatred for Paris’s Romani population, whom he longs to exterminate. Like his original character in Hugo's novel, Frollo adopts Quasimodo as his son and lusts after the Romani girl Esmeralda to the point of obsession and resolves that she will belong to him or he will execute her. Frollo believes everything he does is according to God's will, despite his hypocrisy in lusting after Esmeralda and treating her people and Quasimodo with cruelty.

Director Gary Trousdale described the film's Frollo as "a horrible, horrible person", while Tony Jay, who voiced him, compared him to Hannibal Lecter in The Silence of the Lambs.

== Appearances ==
=== The Hunchback of Notre Dame ===
In the film, Frollo and his soldiers capture a group of Romani people attempting to immigrate to Paris on a boat; a Roma woman in the group attempts to flee with her deformed baby, but Frollo, believing it to be stolen goods, pursues her to Notre Dame Cathedral, when she sought sanctuary to escape from him. Frollo knocks her down, and she strikes her head and dies. Aghast at the baby's deformity, Frollo tries to kill the child by throwing him into a nearby well, but the cathedral's Archdeacon intervenes and accuses Frollo of murdering an innocent woman in front of the cathedral. Fearing divine retribution, Frollo reluctantly agrees to raise the deformed child in Notre Dame as his son, to atone for his sin and in the hope that he will someday be "useful" to him. He mockingly names the child "Quasimodo" (meaning "half-formed"), and teaches him that the world outside the cathedral is a sinful place full of people who would shun him for his deformity, even lying that his mother abandoned him and that Frollo saved him from this fate.

Twenty years later, in the Palace of Justice, Frollo appoints a new Captain of the Guard, Phoebus, stating his intent to eradicate the city's Romani population by discovering their sanctuary, the "Court of Miracles". While attending the annual Festival of Fools, Frollo discovers a Romani dancer, Esmeralda, who attracts him with her beauty; she dances in front of him and kisses him on the nose. He finds that Quasimodo has left the bell tower and joined the Festival. After being crowned King of the Fools for his deformity, Quasimodo is humiliated by the crowd after Frollo's guards start a riot. To teach him a lesson for disobeying him, Frollo refuses to help him, going so far as to refuse Phoebus' request to stop the cruelty, until Esmeralda defiantly frees Quasimodo. Phoebus refuses to arrest her for witchcraft inside Notre Dame and instead tells Frollo that she has claimed sanctuary inside the cathedral; the Archdeacon orders Frollo and his men out, reminding him of his promise of never again assaulting the cathedral. Frollo lusts after Esmeralda, sniffing her hair and calling her beautiful.

In the fireplace chamber of the Palace of Justice, Frollo, through song, begs the Virgin Mary to save him from her "spell"; he then resolves that she will be his, or she will die, asking God to have mercy on both of them. When Frollo learns that Esmeralda has escaped Notre Dame, he instigates a citywide manhunt for her, capturing and bribing Romani and burning countless houses in his way. Phoebus is appalled by Frollo's actions and openly defies him, and Frollo orders him executed as punishment for his insubordination. While fleeing, Phoebus is struck by an arrow and falls into the River Seine, but Esmeralda rescues him and takes him to Notre Dame for refuge.

Realizing that Quasimodo helped Esmeralda escape, Frollo returns to Notre Dame, and misleads Quasimodo, stating that he knows where the Court of Miracles is and will attack it at dawn. Previously, Esmeralda gave Quasimodo a pendant to help him and Phoebus find the Court of Miracles, and they warn the Roma about the attack. Frollo follows them and his men capture all present, thanking Quasimodo for being "useful". The next day, Frollo prepares to have Esmeralda burned at the stake in front of Notre Dame, but offers to spare her life if she submits to his desires. A disgusted Esmeralda rejects his advances, and Frollo prepares to execute her. A chained Quasimodo frees himself and rescues Esmeralda, bringing her to the cathedral.

An enraged Frollo orders his soldiers to seize the cathedral, ignoring his promise and the Archdeacon's pleas for him to stop. Phoebus releases the captured Roma, rallying the citizens of Paris against Frollo and his men, and Quasimodo pours molten lead around the cathedral to protect it. Frollo pursues Quasimodo and Esmeralda to the cathedral balcony to kill them, and reveals to a shocked Quasimodo that he killed his mother. In the ensuing fight, Quasimodo pulls Frollo off the balcony, though he nevertheless saves him from falling into the molten lead. Undeterred, Frollo climbs onto a gargoyle and raises his sword to strike at Esmeralda and Quasimodo, but the gargoyle crumbles underneath him, causing him to lose his balance. At this moment, Frollo sees the gargoyle's demonic face come to life and snarl at him. The gargoyle then breaks off entirely, sending the terrified Frollo falling to his death into the molten lead (symbolizing his soul has been damned to Hell).

=== Other appearances ===
Frollo has recurring cameo appearances in the animated television series House of Mouse, as one of the guests in the titular club. He also appears in a cameo in the series' direct-to-video film Mickey's House of Villains.

Frollo is one of the Disney villains with a main focus in the anthology film Once Upon a Halloween, where the scene of his song "Hellfire" is shown as one of the film's clips.

In the Kingdom Hearts series, Frollo appears in the video game Kingdom Hearts 3D: Dream Drop Distance, serving as the main antagonist in the La Cité des Cloches world, having the same role as in the movie, but unlike most Disney villains, he does not serve as a boss fight.

Claude Frollo appears in the video game Disney Magic Kingdoms as a playable character to unlock for a limited time.

In the game Twisted Wonderland, there is a character based on Frollo named Rollo Flamme, a young man who first appears in the "Glorious Masquerade: Let the Bell of Solace Ring" event. He is the president of Noble Bell College's School Council, where there is a statue of Frollo, who is known as "The Righteous Judge" by the students.

Frollo makes a cameo appearance in the 2023 short Once Upon a Studio.

== Development ==
Frollo was voiced by Tony Jay, whom directors Kirk Wise and Gary Trousdale chose for the role based on his brief appearance as Monsieur D'Arque in their previous film, Beauty and the Beast (1991), and animated by Kathy Zielinski. Features of the character were inspired by the actor Stewart Granger and Hans Conried, especially the latter's appearance in the 1953 film The 5,000 Fingers of Dr. T.. The film's producer, Don Hahn, stated that the character of Frollo was inspired by Ralph Fiennes' performance in Schindler's List as Amon Göth, a Nazi who hates and murders Jews, yet desires his Jewish maid. Screenwriter Tab Murphy made Frollo Paris' justice minister rather than an archdeacon, thus avoiding religious sensibilities in the finished film.
