= Someday (Disney song) =

Song from Disney's The Hunchback of Notre Dame

Song by Heidi Mollenhauer
- Recorded: 1996
- Composer: Alan Menken
- Lyricist: Stephen Schwartz
- Producers: Alan Menken, Stephen Schwartz

"Someday" is a song from Disney's 1996 animated feature film The Hunchback of Notre Dame. It was written by composer Alan Menken and lyricist Stephen Schwartz and originally recorded by American singer and actress Heidi Mollenhauer in her film role as the singing voice of Esmeralda. It was one of three recordings, along with "In a Place of Miracles" and "As Long as There's a Moon", that were discarded during the storyboarding process to be replaced by "God Help the Outcasts." The codirectors Gary Trousdale and Kirk Wise both desired a quieter song for Esmeralda's scene inside the Notre-Dame de Paris cathedral.

Selected as the lead single from the film's soundtrack in 1996, "Someday" was recorded by all–male R&B group All-4-One for the North American release, while British female R&B trio Eternal recorded their own version for the British English version of the song that received international release throughout Europe and Oceania. Mexican singer Luis Miguel recorded a Spanish version for the Latin American market, retitled "Sueña", which became a major hit. The French version was recorded by Ophélie Winter, retitled "Un Jour". The Italian version was recorded by Neri per Caso, retitled "Quando". The youngest Celtic Woman member Chloë Agnew covered this song for her solo album called Walking in the Air and her first Celtic Woman album. Jackie Evancho covered this song for the Target deluxe version of her album Dream With Me. The Korean version was recorded by R&B trio Solid, which was released in Korea as a bonus track of the original soundtrack album. In 2016, the song was included in the musical version of the film as performed by Ciara Renée and Andrew Samonsky as Esmeralda and Phoebus.

== Usage in The Hunchback of Notre Dame ==
Within the film itself, the only complete version of "Someday" is the All-4-One version that plays over the closing credits. Several lines of the song are also heard over the opening title. This version is sung in Latin in the style of a Gregorian chant and is titled "Olim", meaning "once", on the soundtrack of the stage musical. Within the body of the film, the melody of "Someday" is heard several times as an instrumental, particularly during moments between Quasimodo and Esmeralda, such as when Esmeralda comes onto the pillory, when she reads Quasimodo's palms, and when Quasimodo thinks that Esmeralda is dead. These are on the film soundtrack as "Humiliation (Score)", "The Bell Tower (Score)", and "And He Shall Smite the Wicked (Score)".

== All-4-One version ==
"Someday"

Single by All-4-One

from the album The Hunchback of Notre Dame: An Original Walt Disney Records Soundtrack
- B-side: "The Bell Tower"; "A Guy Like You"
- Released: June 10, 1996
- Length: 4:17
- Label: Walt Disney; Atlantic
- Composer: Alan Menken
- Lyricist: Stephen Schwartz
- Producer: Walter Afanasieff

All-4-One singles chronology
"These Arms" (1996)	"Someday" (1996)	"I Turn to You" (1997)

Licensed audio
- "Someday" (soundtrack version) on YouTube

For the American music market, Disney enlisted R&B band All-4-One to record their own rendition of "Someday" for the film's accompanying soundtrack. While the album version of their recording was produced and arranged by William Ross, songwriter Walter Afanasieff was consulted to produce a radio mix of the song that was released by Walt Disney Records and Atlantic Records as the set's first single to US radios on June 10, 1996. The band premiered the song at the New Orleans premiere of The Hunchback of Notre Dame.

All-4-One's fourth and final top 40 entry on the US Billboard Hot 100, the single peaked at number 30 on the chart. On Billboard's component charts, it reached number 14 on the Adult Contemporary chart. A music video for "Someday" was directed by Antoine Fuqua.

=== Critical reception ===
Larry Flick from Billboard magazine viewed the song as a "sweet power ballad". He added, "The touch of producer Walter Afanasieff is unmistakable, as the act is surrounded by glistening synths and a slaw finger-snappin' rhythm that may remind some of his work with Mariah Carey. A lovely effort that deserves a fair shake at both AC and top 40 stations." Peter Miro from Cash Box wrote, "Crescendos mount on this banging performance by All-4-One. The quartet makes evocative use of a full orchestra, from a simple overture, building to a resounding climax. Which is how Disney likes to tie up its movies."

=== Track listings ===
- CD single
1. "Someday" (radio mix) – 4:19
2. "Someday" (album version) – 4:17

=== Charts ===
Chart (1996)	Peak position
Canada Top Singles (RPM)	57
Canada Adult Contemporary (RPM)	26
New Zealand (Recorded Music NZ)	41
US Adult Contemporary (Billboard)	14
US Billboard Hot 100	30
US Hot R&B/Hip-Hop Songs (Billboard)	89
US Cash Box Top 100	30

=== Sales and certifications ===
Region	Certification	Certified units/sales
United States (RIAA)	Gold	500,000^{^}
^{^} Shipments figures based on certification alone.

== Eternal version ==
"Someday"
- One of artwork variants

Single by Eternal

from the album The Hunchback of Notre Dame: An Original Walt Disney Records Soundtrack and Before the Rain
- B-side: "When You Wish upon a Star"; "A Whole New World"; "The Hunchback of Notre Dame Medley"
- Released: August 5, 1996
- Length: 4:21
- Label: 1st Avenue; EMI United Kingdom
- Composer: Alan Menken
- Lyricist: Stephen Schwartz
- Producer: Simon Climie

Eternal singles chronology
"Who Are You?" (1996)	"Someday" (1996)	"Secrets" (1996)

Licensed audio
- "Someday" on YouTube

In the United Kingdom, all-female trio Eternal lent their vocals to a second version of "Someday". Produced by Simon Climie, it was first released on August 5, 1996, in the UK. English musician Eric Clapton played guitar for this version, and the UK cassette single includes a rendition of the song performed by him. In 1997, it appeared on Eternal's third studio album, Before the Rain.

"Someday" became Eternal's eighth top-10 entry on the UK Singles Chart, where it peaked at number four; this made them the first female group to accumulate 10 consecutive top-20 hits in the UK. At the time, it was the highest-charting song written for a Disney film in the UK. Worldwide, "Someday" entered the top 30 in Australia and Ireland. As of 2019, it has sold 130,000 copies in the UK. The band performed the song for the first time in over a decade for a one-off concert put together as part of the second season of the TV series The Big Reunion.

=== Critical reception ===
British magazine Music Week rated the song four out of five, writing, "Judging by the early enthusiasm for Disney's Hunchback Of Notre Dame movie, this dramatic ballad in the vein of Elton's Circle Of Life outing should be a huge hit."

=== Track listings ===
- UK CD1
1. "Someday"
2. "When You Wish upon a Star"
3. "A Whole New World"
4. "The Hunchback of Notre Dame Medley"
- UK CD2
1. "Someday"
2. "Oh Baby I..." (live '96)
3. "Power of a Woman" (live '96)
4. "Good Thing" (live '96)
- UK cassette single
1. "Someday" (Eric Clapton version)
2. "When You Wish upon a Star"
3. "A Whole New World"
4. "Someday" (alternative strings version)

=== Charts ===
==== Weekly charts ====
Chart (1996–1997)	Peak position
Australia (ARIA)	27
Europe (Eurochart Hot 100)	37
Germany (GfK)	92
Ireland (IRMA)	18
Israel (IBA)	26
Scottish Singles Sales (Official Charts)	5
UK Singles (Official Charts)	4
UK Airplay (Music Week)	8

==== Year-end charts ====
Chart (1996)	Position
UK Singles (OCC)	97

=== Sales ===
Region	Certification	Certified units/sales
United Kingdom	—	130,000

== Luis Miguel version ==
"Sueña"

Single by Luis Miguel

from the album El Jorobado de Notre Dame: Banda Sonora en Español
- Released: 1996
- Genre: Latin pop
- Length: 4:19
- Label: Walt Disney
- Songwriters: Alan Menken, Stephen Schwartz, Renato López, Ignacio "Kiko" Cibrian, Gerardo Flores
- Producer: Walter Afanasieff

Luis Miguel singles chronology
"Amanecí en Tus Brazos" (1995)	"Sueña" (1996)	"Dame" (1996)

Licensed audio
- "Sueña" on YouTube

For the Latin American music market, Disney enlisted Mexican singer Luis Miguel to record the Spanish-language rendition of "Someday" for the Latin American soundtrack. It was adapted into Spanish by Renato López, Kiko Cibrian and Gerardo Flores. Luis Miguel's version was included on his eleventh studio album Nada Es Igual... released in the same year. The cover peaked at number 3 on the Hot Latin Songs chart and became his fourth number one song on the Latin Pop Songs chart. A music video was filmed for Luis Miguel's version.

=== Track listings ===
- CD single
1. "Sueña" — 4:19
2. "Someday" — 4:15

=== Charts ===
Chart (1996)	Peak position
US Hot Latin Songs (Billboard)	3
US Latin Pop Airplay (Billboard)	1

== See also ==
- List of number-one Billboard Hot Latin Pop Airplay hits of 1996
