= The Hunchback of Notre Dame (soundtrack) =

The Hunchback of Notre Dame: An Original Walt Disney Records Soundtrack

Soundtrack album by Various artists
- Released: May 28, 1996
- Recorded: 1995–1996
- Studios: Todd-AO Studios, Los Angeles
- Genres: Pop, musical theatre, film score
- Length: 63:34
- Label: Walt Disney
- Producers: Alan Menken; Stephen Schwartz

Singles from The Hunchback of Notre Dame: An Original Walt Disney Records Soundtrack
- 1. "Someday" Released: June 10, 1996

Professional ratings
Review scores
Source	Rating
Allmusic	3/5 stars
Filmtracks	3/5 stars
Sputnikmusic	4/5

The Hunchback of Notre Dame: An Original Walt Disney Records Soundtrack is the soundtrack to the 1996 Disney animated film The Hunchback of Notre Dame. It includes songs composed by Alan Menken and Stephen Schwartz with vocals performed by Paul Kandel, David Ogden Stiers, Tony Jay, Tom Hulce, Heidi Mollenhauer, Jason Alexander, Mary Wickes, and Mary Stout, along with singles by All-4-One/Eternal, while the film's score composed by Alan Menken.

The single "Someday" originally performed by male R&B band All-4-One on the United States release, was redone by British R&B girl group Eternal for the U.K. release. Luis Miguel recorded the version in Spanish as "Sueña", which became a major hit in Latin America. The album was released on May 28, 1996, by Walt Disney Records, and went on to peak at No. 11 on the Billboard 200.

In 2021, a restored version of the soundtrack was reissued as part of Disney's The Legacy Collection. In addition to the complete songs and score, the two disc set includes demos, outtakes and German language theatrical versions of the songs.

== Track listing ==
All lyrics are written by Stephen Schwartz; all music is composed by Alan Menken.

No.	Title	Artist(s)	Length
1.	"The Bells of Notre Dame"	Paul Kandel, David Ogden Stiers, Tony Jay & Chorus	6:25
2.	"Out There"	Tony Jay and Tom Hulce	4:26
3.	"Topsy Turvy"	Paul Kandel & Chorus	5:36
4.	"Humiliation"	Orchestra and Chorus	1:39
5.	"God Help the Outcasts"	Heidi Mollenhauer & Chorus	3:45
6.	"The Bell Tower"	Orchestra and Chorus	3:05
7.	"Heaven's Light/Hellfire"	Tom Hulce, Tony Jay & Chorus	5:25
8.	"Paris Burning"	Orchestra and Chorus	1:56
9.	"A Guy Like You"	Jason Alexander, Charles Kimbrough, Mary Wickes & Mary Stout	2:54
10.	"The Court of Miracles"	Paul Kandel & Chorus	1:27
11.	"Sanctuary!"	Orchestra and Chorus	6:02
12.	"And He Shall Smite the Wicked"	Orchestra and Chorus	3:30
13.	"Into the Sunlight"	Orchestra	2:08
14.	"The Bells of Notre Dame (Reprise)"	Paul Kandel & Chorus	1:11
15.	"Someday"	All-4-One (US Soundtrack), Eternal (UK Soundtrack)	4:20
16.	"God Help the Outcasts"	Bette Midler	3:29

== Charts ==
Chart (1996)	Peak position
Canada Top Albums/CDs (RPM)	38
US Billboard 200	11

== Sales and certifications ==
Region	Certification	Certified units/sales
Argentina (CAPIF) for the Latin American soundtrack	Gold	30,000^{^}
Canada (Music Canada)	Platinum	100,000^{^}
United States (RIAA)	Platinum	1,000,000^{^}
^{^} Shipments figures based on certification alone.
