= Topsy Turvy (song) =

Song by Paul Kandel

from the album The Hunchback of Notre Dame: An Original Walt Disney Records Soundtrack
- Genre: Show tune
- Length: 5:37
- Label: Walt Disney
- Composer: Alan Menken
- Lyricist: Stephen Schwartz
- Producers: Alan Menken; Stephen Schwartz

"Topsy Turvy" is a song from Disney's 1996 animated feature The Hunchback of Notre Dame. The song is 5:37 long and is performed by Clopin.

== Synopsis ==
The song is sung by the film's gypsy narrator Clopin. It is performed as he introduces the Feast of Fools, and continues up until they crown Quasimodo as the King of Fools.

Christian Answers recounts the scene thus: "During the celebration, he is crowned 'King of the Fools' and finds himself falling instantly in love with the gypsy dancer Esmeralda. Joy turns quickly to sorrow as the crowd cruelly mocks and rejects him for his misshapen appearance, failing to see the charm which lies below his odd looks."

== Composition and context ==
This song and "A Guy Like You" use "the Broadway line-dancing technique of stopping the song and then progressing its bloated performance from a standstill to proper tempo."

== Critical reception ==
BBC.com wrote "Alongside the demonic is some nicely hammy comedy. 'Topsy Turvy' is a big showtime number with a slapstick MC and a swelling chorus." ChristianAnswers wrote "the song for the celebration, describes very well the rest of the story as Quasimodo’s world turns upside down." Filmtracks wrote "The gypsy song 'Topsy Turvy' is a carnival-like, French-styled piece for the Feast of Fools; the static pounding of the title lyric is extremely irritating." Spoonful wrote "'Topsy Turvy' is a sight to see-and dance along with."
