= Made of Stone (disambiguation) =

"Made of Stone" is a 1989 song by the Stone Roses.

Made of Stone may also refer to:

- Made of Stone (play), a 2000 play by Leo Butler
- The Stone Roses: Made of Stone, a 2013 documentary
- "Made of Stone" (Disney song) ("Wie aus Stein"), from the German (1999) and English (2014) stage adaptions of The Hunchback of Notre Dame
- "Made of Stone", a song by Evanescence from Evanescence, 2011
- "Made of Stone", a song by Matt Corby, 2010
