= God Help the Outcasts =

1996 song from the film The Hunchback of Notre Dame

Song by Heidi Mollenhauer

from the album The Hunchback of Notre Dame: An Original Walt Disney Records Soundtrack
- Released: 1996
- Recorded: 1996
- Genre: Pop
- Length: 3:44
- Label: Walt Disney
- Composer: Alan Menken
- Lyricist: Stephen Schwartz
- Producers: Alan Menken; Stephen Schwartz

"God Help the Outcasts" is a song written by composer Alan Menken and lyricist Stephen Schwartz for Walt Disney Pictures' animated film The Hunchback of Notre Dame (1996). A pop ballad, the song is performed by American singer Heidi Mollenhauer as the singing voice of Esmeralda on American actress Demi Moore's behalf, who provides the character's speaking voice.

After Menken and Schwartz wrote "God Help the Outcasts", directors Kirk Wise and Gary Trousdale and Disney CEO Jeffrey Katzenberg debated whether or not the film required a more uplifting song; Menken and Schwartz wrote the inspirational "Someday" with which to replace "God Help the Outcasts" at the behest of Katzenberg. However, Wise and Trousdale ultimately decided that "God Help the Outcasts", a religious ballad, was more suitable for the scene.

American singer and actress Bette Midler recorded a pop rendition of "God Help the Outcasts" for the film's soundtrack. The film version of "God Help the Outcasts" has garnered generally positive reviews from both film and music critics, who enjoyed the song's lyrics and music, as well as Mollenhauer's performance. Conversely, critics deemed Midler's rendition too sentimental and overwrought. In addition to Midler, "God Help the Outcasts" has since been covered by several artists, including singer Lara Fabian in Canadian French and The Little Mermaid's Jodi Benson. The song also appears in the film's stage musical adaptation, performed by Ciara Renée.

== Background ==
Film version (Heidi Mollenhauer)
While Esmeralda asks God to help those the world has forgotten, the nobility pray for material possessions and entitlement.

This "juxtaposition of their selfish petitions to Esmeralda's humble prayer" is illustrated by the huge swelling choir and Mollenhauer's lone voice. The song "is obviously critical of their attitudes as they contrast with Esmeralda's".

"God Help the Outcasts" was written by composer Alan Menken and lyricist Stephen Schwartz, both songwriters who had just recently collaborated on writing the music for Disney's Pocahontas (1995). Upon completing "God Help the Outcasts", Menken and Schwartz composed "Someday" at the behest of Disney CEO Jeffrey Katzenberg; the filmmaker suggested that the dark, somber film required "a more liftable song of inspiration". Also a ballad, "Someday" was to have served "as an energetic alternative to 'God Help the Outcasts'". Ultimately, directors Kirk Wise and Gary Trousdale decided that "God Help the Outcasts" "fit the tone of the scene more effectively".

According to the Deseret News, "Someday" was excluded from The Hunchback of Notre Dame "because it was ... too powerful", while "God Help the Outcasts" is "a more humble, personal song for Esmeralda to sing as she prayed for God's help". Although both "God Help the Outcasts" and "Someday" are similar, "God Help the Outcasts" specifically mentions outcasts while the latter "is about all people coming to together ... for the betterment of everyone". In addition to this, while "God Help the Outcasts" is religious, "Someday" is, according to The Musical Theater of Stephen Schwartz: From Godspell to Wicked and Beyond, "more of an anthem of hope than a prayer".

Dubbing "God Help the Outcasts" one of the highlights of her career, singer Heidi Mollenhauer described the experience in an interview with South Pasadena High School as "very exciting, a little terrifying, and sometimes overwhelming". On recording the song, Mollenhauer said, "The challenge really was to be able to release all that this song made me feel. I get choked up every time I talk about it because I think it's such a beautiful moment." Because Esmeralda is voiced by two different actresses, it was mandatory that Mollenhauer's singing voice blend with actress Demi Moore's husky speaking voice "seamlessly". Mollenhauer's performance of "Someday" is featured on the re-release of The Hunchback of Notre Dame.

== Context, scene and analysis ==
One of The Hunchback of Notre Dame's most poignant moments, "God Help the Outcasts" is Esmeralda's only song. Identified as the film's "prettiest" musical number, the song occurs immediately after Esmeralda, relentlessly pursued by Judge Frollo, claims sanctuary in the Notre-Dame de Paris cathedral upon "see[ing] how ... Quasimodo, and her people are treated by others", according to Defying Gravity: The Creative Career of Stephen Schwartz, from Godspell to Wicked "bring[ing] with her a bitter and acute awareness of the injustice of her situation". Preceded by a brief exchange between Esmeralda and the Archdeacon, the latter ultimately suggests that Esmeralda approach God for help, explaining, "You can't right all the wrongs of this world by yourself, perhaps there's someone in here who can." During the "heartwarming" musical sequence, Esmeralda "pray[s] selflessly on behalf of the world's outcasts". "[F]illed with religious imagery", the song "sum[s] up everything that [Esmeralda] stands for". Meanwhile, an earnest Quasimodo, enamored with Esmeralda's beauty and sincerity, hides in the bell tower, "overhearing her prayer" and "being drawn down to her".

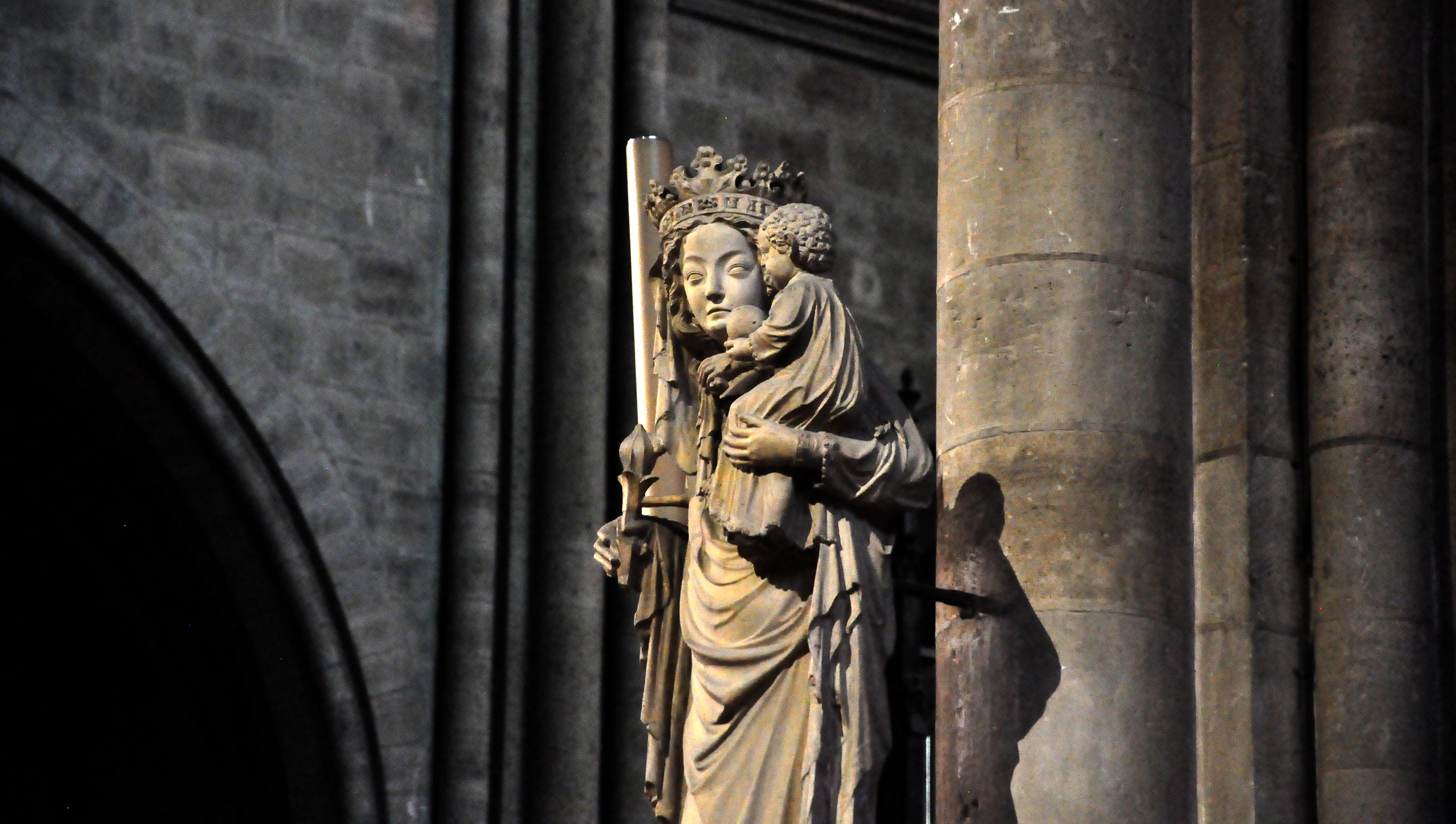
The statue of the Virgin of Paris in the Cathedral of Notre-Dame in Paris

In terms of character development, "God Help the Outcasts" establishes Esmeralda as a "thoughtful, empathetic" character, "worthy of our compassion", "developing Esmeralda's character" while "depict[ing] the rest of the Paris commonfolk as simple and selfish, asking for wealth and fame for themselves while Esmeralda prays for the salvation of the Gypsy race". In Tinker Belles and Evil Queens: The Walt Disney Company from the Inside Out, author Sean Griffin observed that "the more respectable parishioners pray for wealth, fame and glory". According to Annalee R. Ward, author of Mouse Morality: The Rhetoric of Disney Animated Film, "God Help the Outcasts" is a "tender prayer-song" in which "Esmeralda expresses a heart full of concern for others, which ultimately Quasimodo mistakes as a heart for him". Esmeralda is "bathed in colored light from the stained glass window" as "God's light shines down upon Esmeralda" via a rose window. Initially, the song does not specify to whom the prayer is being recited – Mary, Jesus or God. It does, however, suggest that both Mary and Jesus are former outcasts, much like Esmeralda herself. In The Disney Middle Ages: A Fairy-Tale and Fantasy Past, author Tison Pugh described Esmeralda as "latently or innately Christian".

"God Help the Outcasts" is sung by Esmeralda as an intercessory prayer on the behalf of Quasimodo and her people, the gypsies, whom are treated as outcasts by the rest of their society. Esmeralda begins her prayer by realizing that Jesus Christ must have also known what it was like to be treated as an outcast, for his own people crucified him on the Cross at Calvary. The heart of her prayer can be summed up in this statement, "I thought we all were the children of God." – Program notes for the Senior Showcase of Mariel Villarreal and Preston-Joseph Woods.

In Mickey Mouse Monopoly: Disney, Childhood, and Corporate Power, Dr. Robert B. Pettit identified "God Help the Outcasts" as "a plea on behalf of all minorities – not only by ethnicity, but also by race, class, gender, or sexual orientation". Additionally, Pettit feels that the song "might have been a jab at the homophobic religious right who were organizing a boycott of Disney". A somber song, "God Help the Outcasts" also "underlines the theme of Victor Hugo's novel": "At one point in the song, we have a group of rich, well-off Christians asking God for wealth, fame, and love" while "Esmeralda, a penniless gypsy who confessed that she didn't know if God was there, prays for her people and asks that they be shown mercy and love", additionally "pointing out that Jesus was also an outcast when he walked on this Earth, and that we're all children of God no matter who we are or what we've done". The scene additionally suggests "a more positive view of the Church than found in Hugo's novel" as it provides outcasts such as Esmeralda with both shelter and sanctuary.

== Music and lyrics ==
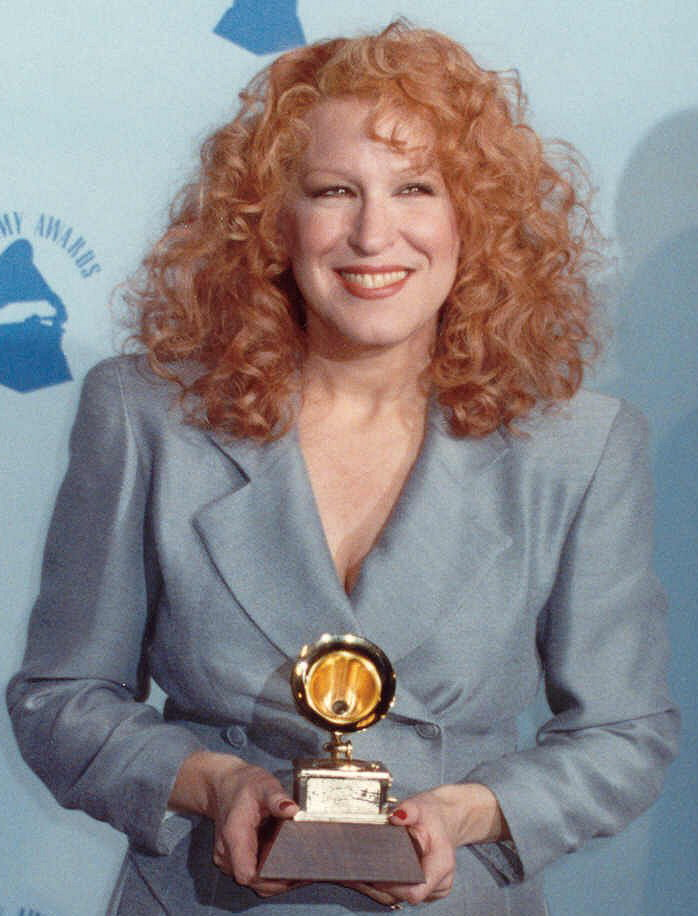
In addition to being shorter, singer Bette Midler's pop rendition of "God Help the Outcasts" features modified lyrics.

Single version (Bette Midler)
Midler's version of the song, featuring modified lyrics

According to the song's official sheet music, published at Musicnotes.com by Walt Disney Music Publishing, "God Help the Outcasts" is a pop power ballad, written in the key of B♭ major at a slow tempo of 63 beats per minute in triple 3/4 time. The vocal range of singer Heidi Mollenhauer, who provided Esmeralda's singing voice in lieu of actress Demi Moore, spans two octaves, from F_{3} to C_{5}. Transposed to the higher key of E♭ major, Midler's vocal range also spans two octaves, from B♭_{3} to F_{5}. While Mollenhauer's version spans three minutes and forty-five seconds, Midler's rendition of "God Help the Outcasts" lasts a shorter length of three minutes and twenty-six seconds.

"[A]n intercessory prayer", "God Help the Outcasts" is both "a powerfully quiet song" and a "heart-rending aria" performed with "agony and beauty". Musically, the "heart-wrenching ballad" "has a Broadway and choral feel to it", distinct from the majority of The Hunchback of Notre Dame's songs due in large part to its "tenderness". A "haunting prayer" and a "simple hymn", "God Help the Outcasts" is "the most spiritual and transendent [sic] tune to emerge from an animated feature". The ballad, "plain in structure", is a "hopeful and sweet anthem" and "lilting plea" accompanied by "syrupy production". According to The Musical Theater of Stephen Schwartz: From Godspell to Wicked and Beyond, "Menken's melody is mostly a descending, stepwise line in triple meter with constantly moving eighth notes accompanying", while "Schwartz wrote four dignified, rhymed couplets for the main tune".

According to the book Film Genre 2000: New Critical Essays, "God Help the Outcasts" has an "unusually somber tone" for an animated Disney film. Performed "as a prayer for deliverance from [the gypsies'] pain and suffering", lyrically, "God Help the Outcasts", a song about faith, explores themes such as discrimination. Additionally, "God Help the Outcasts" "touches on a basic idea behind most faiths". Asking "was Jesus [God] not an outcast, too, as [Esmeralda] sees firsthand how her people, are persecuted for their differences", the first verse of the song reads, "I don't know if You can hear me/Or if You're even there/I don't know if You would listen/To a gypsy's prayer." Teen Ink observed, "This part is about how it seems like God doesn't listen to you or help you, no matter how much you pray or talk to him." Finally, asking people to be kind and unselfish, Esmeralda sings, "Please help my people, the poor and downtrod/I thought we all were the children of God." In The Gospel According to Disney, author Mark I. Pinsky drew similarities between "God Help the Outcasts" and the Christian hymn "His Eye Is on the Sparrow", as both songs explore "the love of God that knows no bounds". Midler's shorter rendition, considered a reprise of Mollenhauer's original, features modified lyrics, replacing "to a gypsy's prayer" with "to a humble prayer".

== International versions ==
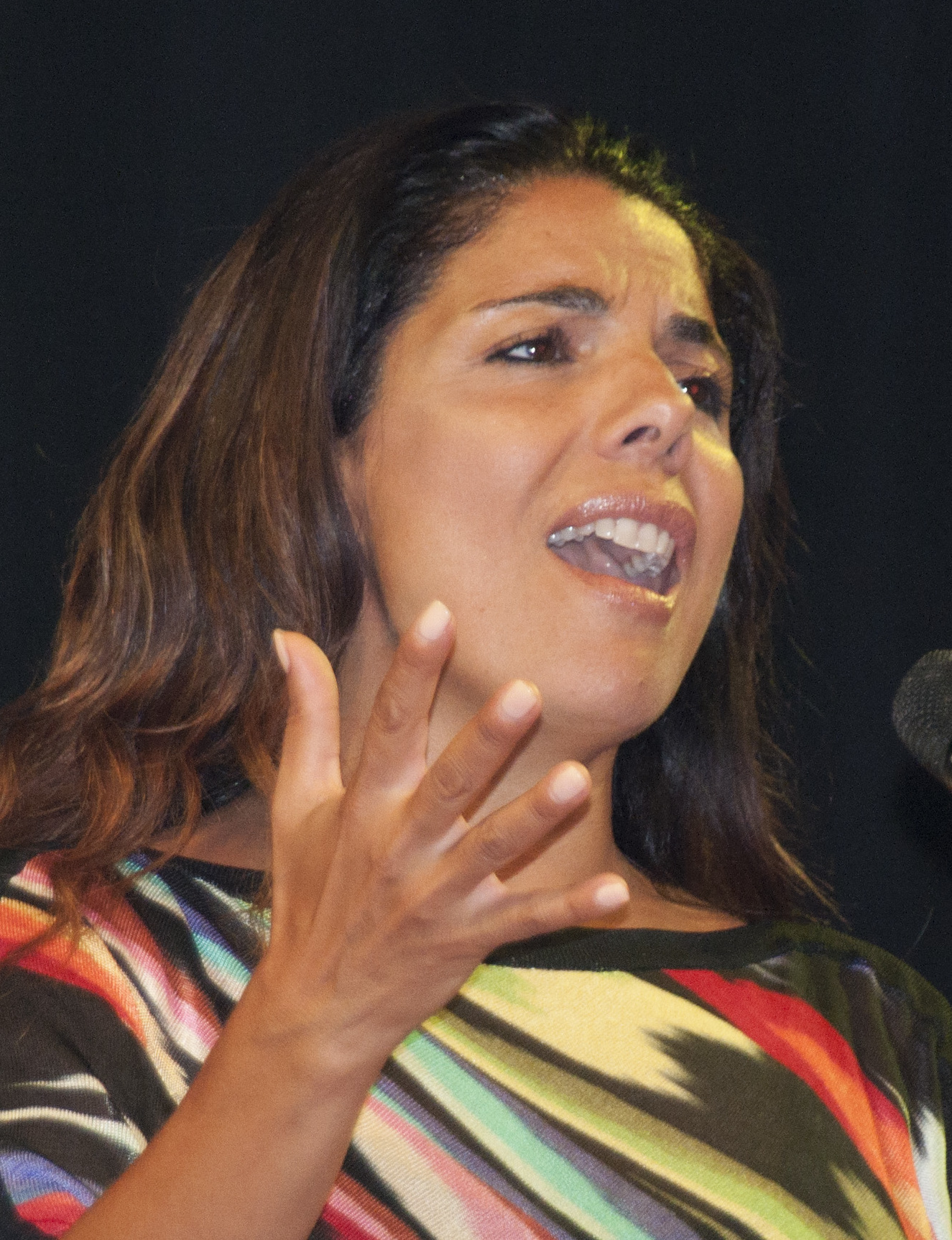
Italian singer Mietta was awarded best foreign Esmeralda worldwide

Belgo-Canadian artist Lara Fabian released the official Canadian French-language single "Que Dieu aide les exclus"; her version was added to the English-language album release in Canada as an extra track. As she provided the singing voice for Esmeralda in the film, the French-Canadian soundtrack contains two separate renditions sung by Fabian – the film version and the single. Marketing coordinator for the Walt Disney Corporation (Canada) Todd Maki said "That hasn't been done before. Originally, when we set up the deal with Lara, it was only to have her sing during the cathedral sequence of the film, but producer Havier Ponton heard her and asked us to do a single version as well". Fabian said "I'm really happy doing this particular character with this song, because it's so touching...The sincerity that comes across [Esmeralda's] face and the intimacy was just amazing".

Mietta, who voiced Esmeralda in the Italian version, won a prize as the best foreign version.

== Reception ==
At the end of Esmeralda's prayer, God's light shines down upon her through Notre Dame's stained glass window. The effects in this sequence have been singled out for their technical quality; All-Reviews praised it as "visually colorful" and "astonishingly detailed".

=== Critical reviews ===
Critical reception towards "God Help the Outcasts" has been generally positive, with some critics dubbing the song the film's "most memorable" and "best number". Janet Maslin of The New York Times wrote very positively of "God Help the Outcasts", saying, "The score ... soars to sanctimonious heights with the lilting, catchy power ballad 'God Help the Outcasts'." Maslin continued, "[the song is] a sure thing for next year's Oscar show". Deeming "God Help the Outcasts" "the primary song" of The Hunchback of Notre Dame, Filmtracks.com hailed it as "A truly lovely and inspirational piece". Filmtracks.com went on to extol Mollenhauer's "elegant" vocal performance, joking, "apparently Demi Moore couldn't sing well enough to suffice". Similarly praising Mollenhauer's delivery, Animation World Network wrote that the singer's "voice timbre blends seamlessly with Demi Moore's speaking voice". Teen Ink described "God Help the Outcasts" as "a wonderful song", while About.com's Espie Estrella highlighted "God Help the Outcasts" as the film's "Featured Song". Hailing The Hunchback of Notre Dame as "my favorite soundtrack of any Disney movie", Emerson College's Entertainment Monthly extolled the film for "trad[ing] the traditional happy tunes for heartfelt and heart-wrenching ballads like ... 'God Help the Outcasts.'"

In a mixed review, Kenneth E. Rathburn of Sputnikmusic commented, "Both versions of 'God Help the Outcasts' offer a level of mid-road quality that came to be expected after the Disney Renaissance", writing of Mollenhauer's, "The film version seems to limp around a bit while delivering more of that emotional punch needed as we transition to the second act", while Midler's "has that credits vibe we all know and love from Disney films" which "keeps us sticking around when we'd otherwise abandon the theater". However, Rathburn concluded, "said version is a little detached for the sake of thematic relevance". Jack Smith of BBC Online gave the song a very unfavorable review, writing, "The sentiments of 'God Help The Outcasts' ... are spoiled by syrupy production", describing Midler's rendition as "overwrought". Plugged In observed, "One heartwarming scene finds Esmeralda praying selflessly on behalf of the world's outcasts." However, "such moments are overshadowed by simmering passions, a shapely heroine and dark elements likely to upset."

=== Accolades ===
In spite of both The New York Times' and Star-News' predictions that "God Help the Outcasts" would be nominated for the Academy Award for Best Original Song, with Star-News' Howard Cohen writing, "next year's Best Song Oscar is sure to spring from this bunch (our guess is the sugary God Help the Outcasts)", the song was ultimately denied an Academy Award nomination at the 1997 award ceremony, along with the rest of Hunchback's original songs. Notably, prior to The Hunchback of Notre Dame, "Disney had been dominating the Original Song category at the Academy Awards, often claiming multiple nominations and a win, but Hunchback was shut out, receiving only a nod for Original Score." Menken told HitFix, "The loss for the 'Hunchback of Notre Dame' score in 1997 ... were 'disappointing.' In spite of this, Mark A. Robinson, author of The World of Musicals, deemed "God Help the Outcasts" one of Menken's most popular songs in 2014.

Ranking "The Best Disney Soundtracks of the Past 25 Years", Moviefone hailed "God Help the Outcasts" as a "hopeful and sweet anthem" in 2013. Meanwhile, author Sandie Angulo Chen highlighted "God Help the Outcasts" as one of the film's most "Notable Songs". On BuzzFeed's "Definitive Ranking of the 102 Best Animated Disney Songs", "God Help the Outcasts" was ranked fifty-forth.

== Cultural impact ==
=== Live performances ===
"God Help the Outcasts" was adapted for the stage version of The Hunchback of Notre Dame, which premiered in a 1999 German production entitled Der Glöckner von Notre Dame. Called Hilf den Verstoß'nen in German, this rendition is a duet between Esmeralda and Quasimodo, and was originally performed by Judy Weiss and Drew Sarich respectively. Stephen Schwartz said "the scene...with all its candles and projected re-creation of Notre Dame, I thought was absolutely stunning". Reviewer Edward R. Cox wrote "The addition of Quasi to this song adds such a world of unity to the pleas of Esmeralda and the parishioners [and] show[s] his pure compassion for other's pain, unselfishly. A brilliant stage device and moment". The Hunchblog noted turning this song into a duet means Esmeralda gets no solos in the musical. In the 2014-5 La Jolla Playhouse/Paper Mill Playhouse English production, the song was reverted to a solo.

American actress and singer Jodi Benson, best known for voicing Ariel in Disney's The Little Mermaid (1989), performed "God Help the Outcasts" during the Dis Unplugged Podcast Cruise 2.0 in 2010.

=== Covers ===
American performer Debbie Gravitte recorded a medley of "God Help the Outcasts" and "Someday" for her 1994 tribute album Part of Your World: The Alan Menken Album. American gospel singer Cynthia Clawson covered the song on her 1999 album Broken: Healing the Heart. American theatre actress Kerry Butler "made a notable recording in 2008, linked with 'It's a Small World'".
