= Hellfire (song) =

Song by Tony Jay

from the album The Hunchback of Notre Dame: An Original Walt Disney Records Soundtrack
- Released: 1996
- Recorded: 1996
- Genre: Musical theatre
- Length: 5:22 (including "Heaven's Light")
- Label: Walt Disney
- Composer: Alan Menken
- Lyricist: Stephen Schwartz
- Producers: Alan Menken; Stephen Schwartz; Marcus Menna

"Hellfire" is a song from Disney's 1996 animated feature The Hunchback of Notre Dame. The song is sung by the film's main antagonist, Judge Claude Frollo, who is voiced by Tony Jay.

When lustful thoughts regarding the beautiful Romani woman Esmeralda enter Frollo's mind, he "panics and seeks to rid himself of [its] source". This internal struggle prompts "Hellfire", which has been described as "one of the best villain songs of all time". Frollo "confronts his lusting for Esmeralda, blaming her (and God) for turning towards darkness, and pleading to be saved". He sings "destroy Esmeralda, and let her taste the fires of hell, or else let her be mine and mine alone" while the image of Esmeralda "provocatively dances in front of him".

This scene of lust and longing that the song is centered on received press coverage at the time of the film's release, along with the alterations made to give the film a G rating.

== "Heaven's Light" and "Hellfire" ==
The song was intended to contrast with the song "Heaven's Light", which was sung by Quasimodo just moments earlier, expressing his desire for love and hope that Esmeralda may love him, while "Hellfire" focuses on Frollo's internal conflict between his feelings of lust for her and his hatred of the Romani people.

Both songs, which are sometimes referred to collectively as "Heaven's Light"/"Hellfire" (for example on the soundtrack, in which it is track 7), describe two opposing views towards the same woman. Quasimodo sees love in "Heaven's Light" and expresses a pure hope for Esmeralda, while Frollo feels only lust for her and therefore views his inner lustful passions in "Hellfire".

== Composition ==
It begins in B-flat major, before turning to its relative minor G minor. Though it modulates, it primarily relies on D minor, finishing in that key as well.

"Hellfire" contains parts of the Confiteor, a Latin prayer of confession used by the Roman Catholic Church. This prayer begins directly after "Heaven's Light" and serves as the introduction to "Hellfire". It also provides counterpoint material throughout the song, whose ending also contains the "Kyrie Eleison".

The instrumental accompaniment to the song serves as a musical motif that alters in tone depending on the action. As well as some variations heard early on (such as in "The Bells of Notre Dame"), this motif "informs much of the score that chronologically follows in the film." Reviewer Christian Clemmensen of Filmtracks.com adds that "both 'Paris Burning' and 'Sanctuary!' explicitly continue the instrumental backdrop and Latin chanting of 'Hellfire', a sound that becomes more general in 'And He Shall Smite the Wicked'." Also, "the opening fanfare is also reintroduced at the end of 'Heaven's Light', makes up the melody during the chorus of 'Hellfire', and plays in the instrumental 'Sanctuary!'"

== Visual sequence ==
The beginning of the song starts with the Archdeacon swinging the incense-filled thurible, as he and his altar servers walk through Notre-Dame, chanting the beginning of the Confiteor. The camera pans upwards to the famous rose window, and flies through it and over Paris, revealing that all the lights in the city are going out as people are turning in for the night. The only light that remains is the light in the Palace of Justice where Frollo looks out at Notre Dame from his window, singing to the Virgin Mary (whom he addresses as "Beata Maria," Latin for "Blessed Mary") about how she knows he is "a righteous man" and purer than "the common, vulgar, weak, licentious crowd". Frollo walks to the fireplace and asks Saint Mary why he lusts for Esmeralda if he is pure. During this, a fire apparition of Esmeralda dances provocatively in the flames.

During the second verse, Frollo steps back from the fireplace, revealing a piece of silk that Esmeralda had used to tease him earlier in the film. Frollo sings about how he lusts for her and resents her for it. He accuses her of turning him to sin and denies his own culpability as red-hooded figures rise from the floor, chanting "mea culpa" ("my fault"). As he looks at them for a few seconds, the light forms the shape of a coffin, foreshadowing his eventual fate. Frollo runs through the chamber, with the cloaked figures standing on either side of him. He passionately declares his inculpability, claiming that Esmeralda had cast a spell on him and tempted him. He reaffirms his innocence by claiming it's not his fault that God "made the Devil so much stronger than a man." The red hooded figures turn into flames, enveloping Frollo as they return to the fireplace as if he were being dragged down into Hell, foreshadowing his fate.

Frollo continues singing, pleading to Mary to rescue him from Esmeralda's voluptuous temptations that would lead to his eternal damnation. He holds out the scarf and clenches it angrily, claiming that Esmeralda must burn or become his lover. The fire apparition of Esmeralda returns, but her provocative dancing is replaced by her shriek-filled writhing as she is about to burn. A smoke apparition of Esmeralda emerges from the fireplace, and as Frollo embraces it passionately, there is a knock at the door. The apparition disappears as a guard enters, cloaked in light, informing Frollo that Esmeralda escaped from the Cathedral of Notre Dame where Frollo had "imprisoned" her. Refusing this answer to his prayers, Frollo furiously orders the guard to leave – "Get out, you idiot!" – and vows to find Esmeralda, even if he has to burn down all of Paris. Frollo continues singing, claiming that he will give Esmeralda an ultimatum: she must choose to accept him as her lover or be burned at the stake. Frollo then throws Esmeralda's scarf into the fireplace, symbolically burning her as well.

In the final verse, Frollo backs up against a wall and asks God to have mercy on him and Esmeralda, implying that he ultimately knows that his actions violate God's will. As he sings, shadowy figures holding crucifixes emerge from the light of the fireplace and swarm Frollo as he drops to his knees. Finishing the song, Frollo passes out and falls face down on the floor in the shape of the Petrine Cross as the fire fades.

== Production ==
The producers of Disney's adaptation of The Hunchback of Notre Dame stated that they felt that the "Hellfire" scene was important in portraying Frollo as he was in Victor Hugo's 1831 original novel. They hoped that this sequence would be one of the greatest animated sequences ever produced. Frollo was animated by Kathy Zielinski and the sequence was storyboarded by French animators Paul and Gaëtan Brizzi, who were the heads of the Walt Disney Feature Animation satellite studio in Montreuil, France. The elements of fire, smoke, and shadows in the sequence required significant support from the Feature Animation visual effects department. According to one of the film's directors, Kirk Wise, Frollo's song "Hellfire" needed a visual sequence more meaningful and powerful than past Disney animated features, akin to the Night on Bald Mountain sequence in Disney's Fantasia (1940), which depicted the devil Chernabog rallying his demons for a single night.

In the audio commentary on The Hunchback of Notre Dame DVD, Wise described his fear that he would have to plead with Feature Animation chairman Roy E. Disney and Walt Disney Company CEO Michael Eisner to let them do the sequence. The two executives ended up enjoying the idea, and no plea was needed.

Wise also indicated that he and visual effects artistic supervisor Chris Jenkins wanted to make sure the "fire-spirit" shots of Esmeralda in the sequence would not endanger the film's possibilities of earning a "G" rating from the Motion Picture Association of America. Thus, they went through every frame to ensure that Esmeralda's figure was fully clothed at all times, despite her provocative dancing. When the film was eventually submitted to the MPAA, the rating board was uncomfortable with the word "sin" being used in the song, so the background sound effects were made louder to drown out the word after it was suggested by producer Don Hahn.

== Themes ==
The Latin Chant in the background is the Confiteor, which is a Catholic penitential prayer recited during Mass as an "admission of guilt and wrongdoing". There is a sense of dramatic irony throughout the song as Frollo sings "It's not my fault / I'm not to blame / It is the gypsy girl / The witch who sent this flame / It's not my fault / If in God's plan / He made the devil so much / Stronger than a man", to which the priests (at this point of the song represented by ominous red-hooded figures) reply in a counterpoint melody with "Mea culpa", Latin for "My fault", or "Mea maxima culpa", meaning "My most grievous fault".

Jim Miles of Laughingplace.com analyses "Hellfire" by saying that the song marks the turning point when "Frollo's hate for the gypsies has taken on a new dimension", and is "no longer about ending vice and sin [but] about fulfilling his own desires". The scarf he takes from Esmeralda "symboli[zes] the physical manifestation of his desire for [her]", and the resulting internal struggle is illustrated in the song. His life's work involves making the city of Paris "pure and righteous", and no matter how much he wants to be too, he sees a "flame...burning within him" and so turns to God (Asking Mary to intercede for him, notable that in his lust he prays to the Holy Virgin) to "help him overcome those feelings". However, throughout his pleading, he holds onto the scarf, thereby holding onto the sin. He tries to rationalize the sin before the "judges of his heart", and seems to be returned to purity, but after the judges disappear the temptation returns. Though he sings "Protect me, Maria" with "repentant agony on his face", he stares into the fireplace and holds onto the scarf, giving into temptation. After being "interrupted by the soldier, he makes a decision within his heart to hold on to the sin". Because the "desire [is now] firmly rooted [within him], he is able to throw away the scarf - the external representation of his inner feelings - into the fire as he has fully accepted this persona. After doing this, he "realizes his mistake, and visually, we see the spiritual battle for his soul--crosses rising above shadowy spiritual figures--but even then, he reconfirms his resolution and proclaims that "she will be mine or she will burn."

Sean Griffin in his work Tinker Belles and Evil Queens: The Walt Disney Company from the Inside Out says that Frollo's hate for Esmeralda seems to stem from his hatred of his own feelings. His shame of "turning to sin" overwhelms him, and he turns to blaming and punishing others. He says that although Frollo's lust for Esmeralda is strictly heterosexual, his odd behavior "mirrors conclusions from studies about homophobia...unconscious conflicts about one's own sexuality or gender identity." He argues that "Frollo's grim determinations to punish Esmeralda [throughout 'Hellfire']" are sparked from his own denial that he has "'urges' that fall outside the rigid parameters of social acceptance."

Miles argues that the "Archdeacon acts as a foil for Frollo" because, through his "caring for Quasimodo's dead mother, he exhibits the kindness and love that God calls all Christians to, which is what Frollo fails to understand". He shows Esmeralda compassion while Frollo only feels contempt toward her. He also "does what Frollo should have done" by "direct[ing] her attention to God." The climax of this is when "he leads a prayer in Latin that calls upon God, Mary, the archangel Michael, the apostles, the saints, and...the Father, for the forgiveness of sin in thought, word, and deed." This leads straight into "Hellfire". Miles says that "while the Archdeacon turns from sin, Frollo chooses to toy with sin."

There is a juxtaposition of imagery between Heaven and Hell between the two parts of "Heaven's Lights"/"Hellfire".

== Critical reception ==
The song was universally acclaimed, and it is considered to be one of the highlights of the soundtrack to The Hunchback of Notre Dame which in turn received generally mixed to positive reviews. The consensus is that if the direction taken with "Hellfire" had been taken for the other songs, the film as a whole would have been substantially better.

In a review of the film's soundtrack, Christian Clemmensen of Filmtracks.com stated that "the darkest depths of The Hunchback of Notre Dame exist in 'Hellfire', one of the most stunning visual and aural combinations in animation history." Though the film was aimed at children as well as adults, Clemmensen comments that the "constantly frightening Latin chants and a heavy string, timpani, and choral bass" scared the younger demographic (despite attempts at lighthearted music and humour to dilute the film). He argues that if Disney had fully embraced the dark nature of the source material by building the soundtrack upon numbers like "Hellfire" and "Sanctuary!", "the film could have been a brilliant adult feature." He says the "spattering of comedy pieces", which include three "silly songs", are "a significant detriment to the gains of the aforementioned themes and performances", and ultimately cause both the film and soundtrack to be a "mixed bag." Pieces such as "Hellfire" are "serious, dramatically brilliant [and among] some of Menken's very best work." Later on in his review, Clemmensen notes the Latin mass which leads into "[Tony] Jay's hauntingly deep performance of Frollo's torment," and adds that it "produc[es] a song so overwhelmingly compelling in an evil sense that it alone was worth the cost of admission (and the album)."

Jim Miles of Laughingplace.com says that "Frollo's passionate pleading" is "visually astounding, masterfully conceived and animated," and the "standout" of the film. He adds that "accompanied by intense music of agony and complex lyrics of psychological revelation, 'Hellfire' is everything a musical scene aspires to be." Reviewer Kenneth E. Rathburn said the song's "grandeur... contributes and fulfills" more than other songs, such as "A Guy Like You", making it one of the better tracks. Jack Smith of the BBC describes the tone (set by the opening number) as "an unholy marriage of the Tridentine Mass and Les Mis." He says the score, "driven by hysterical choirs and crashing percussion" is most effective in "Hellfire". The San Antonio Express-News described it as The Hunchback of Notre Dame's "true show-stopping tune." Simon Brew of Den of Geek! says the suffering Frollo goes through in this song makes him a "far more rounded villain." He describes "Hellfire" as "a stunning piece of work, with the visuals and music working in complete tandem."

== Controversy ==
The song is considered to be one of the darkest in any Disney film, depicting Hell, sin, damnation, and lust, examples of subject matter that would generally be considered inappropriate for children. This song and visual sequence prompted the MPAA to consider a PG rating for the film. In its defense, Disney claimed that its adaptation of The Hunchback of Notre Dame was intended to play as much to adult audiences as it would to children.

In Film Genre 2000: New Critical Essays, film critic Marc Miller said that "Hellfire" "was too much for many adults," which prompted reviewers such as Mark Silver of The Los Angeles Times to say things like: "[Hunchback is] a beautiful powerful film that I would not recommend to children under eight or nine years old."

Disney animator Floyd Norman recalled the pitching session for the film, in which Menken and Schwartz were "on hand to perform the songs that would grace the production." He recalls "Hellfire" "clearly ha[ving] the executives squirming nervously," wondering if this material could be in a Disney film.

The "Hellfire" subplot, "involving the villain's need to desire to fornicate and/or murder the heroine because of his guilt-ridden lustings for her," which was described as "a cross between Schindler's List and Sweeney Todd" by Scott Mendelson of HollywoodNews.com, was also referred to by him as one of the Disney events such as Mufasa being killed on-screen in The Lion King, that surprisingly were given "G-ratings from the MPAA back in the 1990s," which Mendelson uses as context when discussing Tangled's PG rating.
