= Out There (Disney song) =

Song by Tony Jay and Tom Hulce

from the album The Hunchback of Notre Dame: An Original Walt Disney Records Soundtrack
- Released: May 28, 1996
- Length: 4:25
- Label: Walt Disney
- Composer: Alan Menken
- Lyricist: Stephen Schwartz
- Producers: Alan Menken; Stephen Schwartz; Ted Kryczko; Joey Miskulin; Gary Powell

"Out There" is a song from the 1996 Disney animated film The Hunchback of Notre Dame. Unofficially, it consists of the two songs "Stay In Here" and "Out There". In the stage musical version, Frollo's "Stay In Here" section was expanded into its own song entitled "Sanctuary".

== Writing and recording ==
In 1993, while working on the songs for Pocahontas (1995), Alan Menken and Stephen Schwartz decided to collaborate again on The Hunchback of Notre Dame. Each of them were drawn to the story's emotional complexity and central themes. On his online journal, Schwartz cited "the underlying themes — the idea of social outcasts and the worth of people being different than what society sees on the surface — and the struggle of Quasimodo to break free of the psychological dominance of Frollo."

The first piece of music Menken composed was the melody for "Out There"—Quasimodo's opening statement of longing for the world beyond his tower—which he played for Schwartz at their first working session over dinner. Menken remembered: "I said I have this piece of music I'm working on, and I played it for him, and he's like, "That's it. That's 'Out There.'"

The melody was completed, though Schwartz asked for one change to the chorus refrain and otherwise accepted it as written. He drafted the song's lyrics during the Paris research trip, sitting alone in the bell tower of Notre-Dame with a notepad, imagining the city of 1482 from Quasimodo's vantage point. Menken further explained: "We literally used that piece of music. The music is really all in the bells — it's French music borne out of that grand percussion. From the very top of the movie, we establish where this score is going to come from."

Jeffrey Katzenberg, then-chairman for Walt Disney Studios, initially envisioned the film as a rock opera and sought Meat Loaf for the title role. However, negotiations between Disney and Meat Loaf's record company broke down. Mandy Patinkin was invited to audition for the role of Quasimodo. Patinkin, whose favorite actor was Charles Laughton—who had played Quasimodo in the 1939 film adaptation—sought to emulate that performance. During one session, Patinkin brought his own accompanist to rearrange the song "Out There" to his own interpretation.

Patinkin held further recording sessions with the film's directors Gary Trousdale and Kirk Wise. As they explained one scene, Patinkin threw up his hands and said, "Guys, I'm really sorry. I can't do this." Patinkin left and went into the rehearsal hall, where he argued with Menken and Schwartz. Trousdale privately commemorated the episode in a drawing he titled "The Patinkin Incident." Schwartz subsequently referred to it as "Battleship Patinkin." In 1997, Patinkin told the Los Angeles Times that the producers "had their own Disney needs". He later portrayed Quasimodo in a separate 1997 television film.

Afterwards, Tom Hulce was invited to audition. At his first session, he remembered: "It was hard for me. I'd never done anything that was just standing in front of a microphone in a little glass booth. The first time I met the Disney folks, I went in to sing "Out There." Hulce noticed, "As I was about a third-way of the way throughout the song, I noticed they all had their heads down, staring at the floor—it looked like they were having a little memorial service. I thought, 'Oh dear, they're horribly embarrassed for me.'" Hulce later recognized the team were actually glancing at the storyboard sketches drawn for the scene and trying to figure out if they were hearing matched with the storyboards. The production team had a practice of listening to voice auditions with their eyes closed, focusing solely on whether the voice felt native to the character drawing before them.

Hulce's session was so spontaneous—particularly in a quiet scene involving a baby bird—that his rehearsal recording was used as the final take. "It was the least overworked and the most spontaneous, and felt emotionally real to us," Wise stated. Hulce was permitted to perform his own singing after a demonstration recording of "Out There" confirmed his capabilities. Early into the initial recordings, Hulce provided the voice of Quasimodo with a vaguely British accent as he had been raised by Frollo. However, this approach did not work and Hulce considered he might have to leave the role. Trousdale and Wise instead were guided by Victor Hugo's own specifications in the novel that Quasimodo is 20 years old. Therefore, Hulce provided the voice with a younger quality than the previous screen portrayals.

== Synopsis ==
At this point in the film, Quasimodo wants to attend the Feast of Fools, but has never been allowed out of Notre Dame's bell tower before. His master Frollo tells him the outside world will treat him like a monster and says for his own sake he must stay where he is. After Frollo leaves, Quasimodo laments about what it would be like out in the real world and pictures a romanticized version.

In one shot, Belle from the 1991 film Beauty and the Beast makes a cameo appearance in the streets of Paris reading her book. In the same shot, someone can be seen beating out the magic carpet from the 1992 film Aladdin.

== Composition ==
The song actually consists of two separate sections, centering upon the themes of entrapment and escape. Frollo's "Stay In Here" and Quasimodo's "Out There" juxtapose each other and express the motivations behind both characters and their relationship to each other.

== Critical reception ==
Jeremy Gerard of Variety felt "Out There" was "a song with more than passing resemblance to "Part of Your World," from The Little Mermaid." Janet Maslin of The New York Times noted Disney's repeated use of "I Want" songs in their previous animated films and felt the approach this time was "taking on a standard look."

Den of Geek! noted "We're already talking about just how dark the song 'Hellfire' goes, but there's also the earlier duet in 'Out There' between Frollo and Quasimodo...It's hardly High School Musical, is it?" Filmtracks.com wrote "The character song 'Out There' opens with a frighteningly sinister conversational interaction between Frollo and Quasimodo before the latter performs his compelling cry for identity with flourishing and redemptive orchestral accompaniment. Tom Hulce's voice, especially compared to Tony Jay, is appropriately light."
