= SACRA/PROFANA =

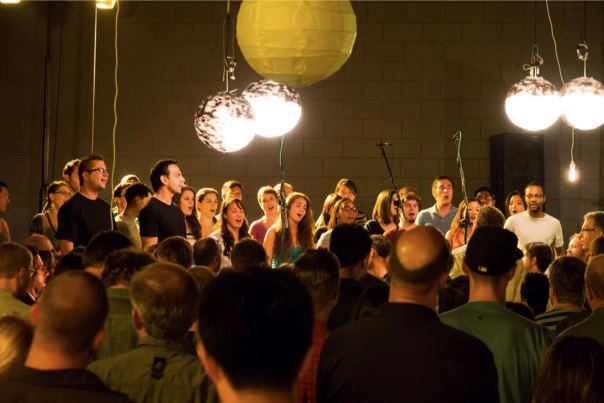
SACRA/PROFANA performing in Los Angeles September 11, 2012

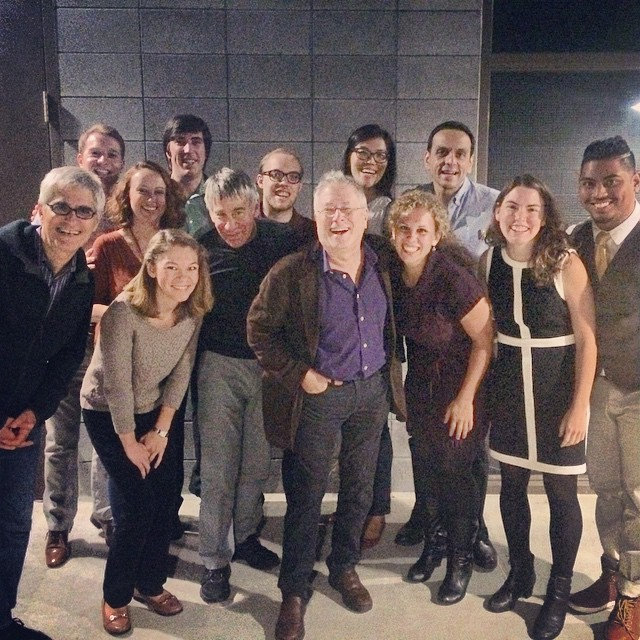
Members of SACRA/PROFANA with composer Alan Menken, lyricist Stephen Schwartz and author Peter Parnell during rehearsals for the U.S. premiere of The Hunchback of Notre Dame, October 13, 2014.

SACRA/PROFANA is a California-based chamber choir founded in 2009. They are noted for their eclectic and unorthodox approach to choral repertoire, and for appearing as the onstage choir for fifty consecutive performances of The Hunchback of Notre Dame during its American premiere at the La Jolla Playhouse in 2014.

== History ==
SACRA/PROFANA was founded in 2009 by Krishan Oberoi, a graduate of Yale University. During the choir's first season, the ensemble performed exclusively at the University of San Diego and the San Diego Museum of Art. In 2011, the ensemble began exploring new venues such as San Diego's club Anthology. In May 2011, they were invited by conductor Jung-Ho Pak to perform Friede Auf Erden by Arnold Schoenberg with San Diego's Orchestra Nova. Later in 2011, Pak invited SACRA/PROFANA to perform Messiah by Georg Frideric Handel with the same orchestra. When Orchestra Nova folded in 2012, SACRA/PROFANA stepped in to complete that orchestra's scheduled performance of Messiah.

In March 2012, SACRA/PROFANA received critical acclaim for their performance of the little match girl passion by composer David Lang. The choir released their first CD in the spring of 2012, and was subsequently invited to appear in multiple performances with the San Diego Symphony. In September of that same year, producer Carlton Cuse and author Rob Bell asked SACRA/PROFANA to be the featured musical act at a live event on September 11, 2012 in Los Angeles.

SACRA/PROFANA extended its performance schedule in 2013, appearing with San Diego Dance Theater in multiple performances of music by Ola Gjeilo with choreography by Jean Isaacs. These performances took place at San Diego's Monarch School, an institute for children impacted by homelessness.

During 2013, Artistic Director Krishan Oberoi developed a close relationship with Palm Springs resident Gladys Nordenstrom, the widow of composer Ernst Krenek. SACRA/PROFANA consequently gave several performances of choral works by Krenek in Palm Springs, San Diego and La Jolla.

In the summer of 2013, the ensemble was invited to perform with the La Jolla Music Society in a cantata by Johann Sebastian Bach. The performance, conducted by Michael Beattie, received substantial critical praise.

SACRA/PROFANA performed at the Carlsbad Music Festival for the first time in September 2012, earning positive reviews for their renditions of works by Michael Gordon and György Ligeti. The ensemble would again perform in Carlsbad in 2014, this time in a program featuring the United States premiere of when we were children by David Lang. Shortly thereafter, SACRA/PROFANA produced the first recording of when we were children in collaboration with Lang.

In 2014, SACRA/PROFANA was asked to by Disney Theatrical Productions to perform as the onstage choir for the inaugural performances of The Hunchback of Notre-Dame, a new musical based on the 1996 Disney film. SACRA/PROFANA's Artistic Director Krishan Oberoi served as Choir Master for the production, working with Music Director Brent-Alan Huffman, Director Scott Schwartz, composer Alan Mencken and lyricist Stephen Schwartz in bringing the Oscar-nominated score to the stage. Although the show was met with mixed reviews, SACRA/PROFANA's performance was well received, earning critical praise from many press outlets, including the Los Angeles Times, San Diego Gay & Lesbian News, and Stage Scene L.A.

In March 2014, SACRA/PROFANA performed with the Irish band the Chieftains at San Diego's Copley Symphony Hall. In May 2015, SACRA/PROFANA premiered SNAKESKIN, an evening-length dance drama composed by Krishan Oberoi, and commissioned by choreographer John Malashock. SNAKESKIN, loosely inspired by a Tennessee Williams play, was performed over three consecutive evenings at the La Jolla Playhouse, with eight members of SACRA/PROFANA doubling as singers and instrumentalists. The work received mixed reviews, with one critic writing, "I’m not ready to crown Oberoi as the next Mahler or Bernstein."

== Artistic staff ==
In the spring of 2015, Founding Artistic Director Krishan Oberoi announced that he would leave San Diego in order to pursue doctoral studies in conducting at Boston University. Conductor Juan Carlos Acosta was brought on as Associate Artistic Director, assuming the role of artistic leader in Oberoi's absence (although Oberoi would retain the title of Artistic Director). Acosta quickly earned critical praise for his work with SACRA/PROFANA; critic Ken Herman hailed Oberoi's "visionary direction", while also crediting Acosta with rectifying shortcomings of Oberoi's approach.
