= Made of Stone (Disney song) =

Song composed by Stephen Schwartz

"Made of Stone" (aka "Wie aus Stein") is a song written for the 1999 (German) and 2014 (English) stage adaptions of Disney's 1996 animated film The Hunchback of Notre Dame, based on the book of the same name by Victor Hugo. It is performed by Quasimodo and the Greek chorus of gargoyles.

== Development ==
The song is based on a passage from Hugo's novel, in which Quasimodo wishes he were made of stone. This sentiment appears in the animated film, with the gargoyle character Laverne saying “We just thought you were made of something stronger.”

The quick song "While The City Slumbered" was added to serve as a bridge that ties this song to the previous number Someday.

The song has an impressive vocal range (particularly in the German version).

== Synopsis ==
The song depicts Quasimodo at his lowest moment as he interacts with the gargoyles. It illustrates his pain and suffering, knowing that his crush Esmerelda loves another (in the German version) and knowing that his friend is about to die thanks to his actions (in the English version). In the context of this version of the musical, this song is the 11 o'clock show stopping number and "major anthem", taking place just before the finale while Quasimodo watches Esmerelda be burnt at the stake. He pleads with the gargoyles - figments of his imagination created due to loneliness - for answers. He is angry that they gave him bad and naive advice and realises that his master's words were harsh but true: the world is cruel and wicked. The gargoyles explain that while they may only be made of stone, they thought he was "made of something stronger". He defeatedly concludes that he no longer wants to know what's "out there", and wishes that he, like the gargoyles, were made of stone so he wouldn't be able to feel the pain anymore.

Quasimodo self-examines his inadequacies and misplacement of his faith. He has gone out into the world and become one of the people, but "at what cost"? By the end of the song the gargoyles turn to stone and Quasimodo is left alone to face the future on his own.

== Critical reception ==
The song had been described as: "despairing", "touching", "angry, heartbreaking". RevueWM notes that the song represents a compelling sense of "heartache and disillusionment" that betrays his former "youthful enthusiasm". IvanSteel found the song to have "such raw emotion" that it made him cry in the theatre. The Hunchblog notes the song is filled with "anger and pathos". Geeks Of Doom says the song demonstrates Quasimodo's "reluctance" and "recalcitrance" at saving Esmerelda from her " imminent doom". Talkin Broadway deemed it "beautiful, but short". New Jersey Stage thought the song invites a performer to approached the piece with "detailed, nuanced delivery, and outstanding vocal". Curtain Up thought the "stirring aria" revealed Quasimodo's "tortured soul".
