= The Hunchback of Notre Dame (musical) =

Musical by Alan Menken and Stephen Schwartz

- Artwork from the 2017 Berlin production
- Music: Alan Menken
- Lyrics: Stephen Schwartz
- Book: James Lapine (1999 version); Peter Parnell (2014 version)
- Basis: The Hunchback of Notre Dame by; Tab Murphy; Irene Mecchi; Bob Tzudiker; Noni White; Jonathan Roberts; The Hunchback of Notre-Dame by Victor Hugo
- Productions: 1999 Berlin; 2017 German tour

The Hunchback of Notre Dame is a musical with music by Alan Menken and lyrics by Stephen Schwartz, based upon the 1831 novel by Victor Hugo with songs from Walt Disney Animation Studios' 1996 film. The musical premiered in 1999 in Berlin as Der Glöckner von Notre Dame, with a book by James Lapine. It was produced by Disney Theatrical Productions, being the company's first musical to premiere outside the United States. It ran for three years, becoming one of Berlin's longest-running musicals.

The English-language version, with a revised book by Peter Parnell, had its debut at La Jolla Playhouse in San Diego, California on October 28, 2014, and ran until December 7, 2014. Subsequently, the show went on to open on March 4, 2015, at the Paper Mill Playhouse in Millburn, New Jersey, with more changes in the libretto. The show closed on April 5, 2015.

The musical is notably darker and thematically closer to the source material than the animated film, with composer Alan Menken and lyricist Stephen Schwartz rewriting several songs to match the original tone of the Hugo novel.

== History ==
=== Background (1996–1999) ===
In 1996, Walt Disney Animation Studios created an animated film adaptation of Victor Hugo's novel of the same name with songs by Alan Menken and Stephen Schwartz.

=== Der Glöckner von Notre Dame (1999–2002) ===
Berlin Theatre (now Theater am Potsdamer Platz) sought to stage The Lion King, but after those negotiations fell through Disney offered The Hunchback of Notre Dame instead. This project was a departure from the theatre's history of only importing shows that had proven to be successful on Broadway. Originally rehearsed in English, then retaught in German, the musical opened on June 5, 1999. After a successful run – 1.4 million visitors saw the musical over 1,204 performances – it closed in June 2002.

Directed and revised by Lapine, with music by Menken and Schwartz, the German translation was by Michael Kunze, choreography by Lar Lubovitch, with sets by Heidi Ettinger, costumes by Sue Blane, lighting by Rick Fisher, sound by Tony Meola and projections by Jerome Sirlin. The production cost 45 million marks to produce (approximately U.S. $25 million), much of which was subsidised by state funds. The production featured forty-two actors from six different nations. In addition to the songs from the film, nine new songs were written for this version. This was Disney's first musical to premiere outside the US, and it became one of Berlin's longest-running musicals to date.

=== Intermediate period (2002–2013) ===
Der Glöckner von Notre Dame played in only one German theatre. It was not staged again in this format for many years, but adaptations of the 1996 film The Hunchback of Notre Dame could be seen in various productions around Disney theme parks and cruises.

In 2008 the lyricist, Schwartz, stated, "I think we're starting up Hunchback of Notre Dame, hopefully, next year." In a 2010 interview, the composer, Menken, confirmed that he was working on an American production that used James Lapine's book. In 2013, however, it was announced that the musical would be produced on Broadway with a new book by Peter Parnell and new songs by Menken and Schwartz. In April 2013, the first English adaptation of Der Glöckner von Notre Dame was staged by the Fine Arts Department of The King's Academy Sports & Fine Arts Center in West Palm Beach, Florida. According to The King's Academy, Walt Disney Productions selected them to adapt the work, and noted that Disney was workshopping the musical for a possible run on Broadway. Their director, David Snyder, helped Disney cast talent for the new show.

At the D23 expo, which took place on August 9–11, 2013, Josh Strickland performed the first official version of a new song written for the English language version, "Made of Stone".

=== The Hunchback of Notre Dame (2014–present) ===
The Hunchback of Notre Dame had a workshop in February 2014, and its first North American production ran at La Jolla Playhouse from October 28 through December 7, 2014, directed by Scott Schwartz. The production featured Sacra-Profana, a local 32-voice chorus, appearing onstage throughout the show. The production transferred to the Paper Mill Playhouse in Millburn, New Jersey, with nearly the same cast and a New Jersey choir, the Continuo Arts Symphonic Chorus, from March 4 through April 5, 2015,

A wave of US regional theatre productions of the musical began in 2016; one theatre, Music Theatre Wichita, received a $10,000 grant from the National Endowment for the Arts to financially support the production. In December 2017 the show was staged at the White Plains Performing Arts Center in New York State and opened to outstanding reviews. An adaptation of the musical in 2016 at the Music Circus in Sacramento, California, embraced the novel's assertion that Quasimodo had become deaf after constantly ringing bells all his life by incorporating sign language into the show. Deaf actor John McGinty was cast as Quasimodo, with a surrogate singer (one of the Notre Dame saints, played by Jim Hogan) singing Quasimodo's songs while McGinty signed. A production was staged outdoors in the amphitheater at Tuacahn Center for the Arts July 29 to October 15, 2016.

A Japanese production opened in 2016 at the Shiki Theatre Company, one of the largest theatres in Japan, in Japanese. The production released a cast album in 2017. In April 2017, a new German production based on the reworked US stagings opened at the Theater des Westens in Berlin. After closing in Berlin, the musical moved to Munich and Stuttgart. A production featured an intimate rotating cast of 18 (with no additional choir), and reduced orchestrations with the cast playing their own instruments. The production was directed by Nicholas Wainwright at the University of the Arts in Philadelphia in December 2017. The 5th Avenue Theatre in Seattle staged another version with a Deaf actor signing as Quasimodo, Joshua Castille, alongside E. J. Cardona as his voice and one of the gargoyles from June 1 to June 24, 2018.

The show was performed for the first time in the UK at The Royal Welsh College of Music and Drama by the Richard Burton Company in 2019, directed by Graham Gill. The National Youth Music Theatre (NYMT) staged a production in England at Manchester Cathedral in August 2021. Captivate Theatre staged the first Scottish production of the show at the Edinburgh Festival Fringe in 2023.

OSMaD staged the first production of the show in Australia, at the Geoffrey McComas Theatre in Victoria in 2023. Matthew Tomlin (Quasimodo), Ninna Aguirre (Esmeralda), Tom Liszukiewicz (Phoebus), Zachary Brown (Claude Frollo) and Pasquale Bartalotta (Clopin) led the cast, and there was an on-stage choir of 32.

A concert production of the show was mounted in London's West End in August 2025 with three performances at the Prince Edward Theatre directed by Jonathan O’Boyle and featuring Zachary James as Frollo, Ben Joyce as Quasimodo, Christine Allado as Esmeralda, Dex Lee as Phoebus De Martin, and London Voices providing the choir vocals.

== Plot ==
=== Act I ===
Many years ago, Claude Frollo and his brother Jehan were taken in by Notre Dame after being orphaned. Jehan grew to be mischievous, while Frollo remained pious. After Jehan was caught with a gypsy woman, he was expelled from Notre Dame. Frollo eventually became the archdeacon of the cathedral. One day, Frollo received a letter from Jehan, and the two met in secret. On his deathbed, Jehan gave Frollo his deformed baby before dying. As Frollo prepared to kill the child, he suddenly felt as though he was being tested by God. Instead, he chose to save the child, naming him Quasimodo, meaning "half-formed," and raising him in Notre Dame. As the story progresses, an actor steps forward and assumes the role of Quasimodo, with minor face paint applied to represent his deformity, while the company asks: "What makes a monster, and what makes a man?" ("The Bells of Notre Dame").

In the present day (in the year 1482), Quasimodo is now a young man, made partially deaf by a lifetime of ringing Notre Dame's bells. He talks to Notre Dame's statues of saints and gargoyles about his desire to go to the Feast of Fools. Frollo arrives and asks him who he is speaking to, reminding him that the stone statues cannot talk. They recite the biblical story of the Flight into Egypt, after which Frollo complains about Paris's gypsies and the Feast of Fools ("Sanctuary Part I"). Quasimodo offers to protect him outside; Frollo declines, warning him that he would be shunned if he were to go out in public ("Sanctuary Part II"). Quasimodo sings to himself, yearning to spend one day outside Notre Dame ("Out There").

In the streets of Paris, the Feast of Fools begins, led by Clopin, the gypsy king ("Topsy Turvy Part I"). Meanwhile, Captain Phoebus, the new head of Notre Dame's Cathedral Guard, arrives in Paris from the front lines. Frollo welcomes him, telling him they must rid the city of gypsies ("Rest and Recreation"). Clopin introduces Esmeralda, a gypsy dancer ("Rhythm of the Tambourine")—Quasimodo, Frollo, and Phoebus are all entranced by her. After that, Clopin holds a contest to crown the King of Fools, the ugliest person in Paris. Encouraged by Esmeralda, Quasimodo enters, immediately winning the contest ("Topsy Turvy Part II") before being humiliated by the crowd. Esmeralda rescues Quasimodo with a magic trick before Frollo intervenes. He scolds Quasimodo; the two return to Notre Dame, followed by Esmeralda ("Sanctuary Part III").

Frollo finds Esmeralda, confronting her; after a brief argument, he relents, allowing her to stay. Esmeralda prays to God to help the less fortunate ("God Help the Outcasts"). Phoebus finds Esmeralda; they argue, Phoebus telling her not to fight unwinnable battles, to which she retorts that she cannot help it.

Esmeralda heads to the bell tower, finding Quasimodo there. The two quickly befriend each other ("Top of the World"), Quasimodo ringing the bells of Notre Dame for her. Frollo runs up to the tower, angry at Quasimodo for ringing the bells at the wrong time. He is shocked by Esmeralda's presence, thinking she had left. He offers her shelter so he may save her soul, but she rejects his offer, saying that she sees the way Frollo looks at her. This infuriates Frollo, who orders Phoebus to escort her from Notre Dame and arrest her if she sets foot in it again. Frollo warns Quasimodo that Esmeralda is a dangerous person sent from Hell and to ignore any lustful feelings he may feel towards her. Yet, having developed such feelings for Esmeralda himself, Frollo roams the streets nightly, one night discovering Esmeralda, Clopin and multiple other gypsies partying with Phoebus; Frollo is unable to look away as Esmeralda dances and kisses Phoebus ("Tavern Song (Thai Mol Piyas)"). Meanwhile, in the bell tower, Quasimodo reflects on seeing couples in love from his tower and how he never thought himself worthy of love until meeting Esmeralda ("Heaven's Light").

Frollo prays, begging the Virgin Mary to save him by either condemning Esmeralda to Hell or giving her to him ("Hellfire"). The next day, he approaches Louis XI asking for special powers to stop a 'gypsy witch' to protect Paris, which he is granted. With his new powers, he instigates a citywide manhunt for Esmeralda which leads him to a brothel known for hiding gypsies. When the brothel's owner claims ignorance, Frollo orders Phoebus to burn the brothel down, an order which Phoebus defies. As Frollo orders Phoebus's arrest, Esmeralda appears; a fight breaks loose. Amidst the commotion, Frollo stabs Phoebus and frames Esmeralda for it; she uses a magic trick to escape. Frollo continues the hunt, while Quasimodo grows increasingly worried about Esmeralda's whereabouts ("Esmeralda").

=== Act II ===
Esmeralda returns to Notre Dame, asking Quasimodo to hide the injured Phoebus. She gives Quasimodo a woven band and leaves. Inspired by the story of Saint Aphrodisius and encouraged by the saints, Quasimodo deciphers the woven band as a map and resolves to help her ("Flight into Egypt"). Frollo returns to Notre Dame, asking Quasimodo where Esmeralda is; Quasimodo responds that he doesn't know. Frollo appears to accept this, before a guard informs Frollo that they know where Esmeralda is. Frollo tells Quasimodo that they will now be successful in capturing Esmeralda and leaves ("Esmeralda (Reprise)").

Using the map, Quasimodo and Phoebus go to warn the gypsies ("Rest and Recreation (Reprise)"). Initially, the gypsies attempt to kill the two, but they are saved by Esmeralda. ("Court of Miracles"). The two tell the gypsies Frollo will attack at dawn. The gypsies prepare to leave; Phoebus asks Esmeralda to go with her, the two expressing their love for each other as Quasimodo looks on, heartbroken ("Heaven's Light (Reprise)/In a Place of Miracles"). Frollo suddenly enters, having followed Quasimodo, and arrests all present—only Clopin manages to escape. Frollo has the guards lock Quasimodo in the bell tower.

Frollo visits Esmeralda, telling her that he can save her if she accepts being with him. When Esmeralda refuses, he threatens Phoebus' life and attempts to rape her ("Sanctuary (Reprise)"). He halts when Esmeralda cries out in protest, allowing her to have a final conversation with Phoebus. Phoebus pleads for her to accept Frollo's offer to save herself, which Esmeralda refuses to do. They yearn together for a better future ("Someday"). Meanwhile, in the bell tower, the statues encourage Quasimodo to free himself and save Esmeralda; Quasimodo angrily denounces them, declaring that he will remain stoic until he dies ("Made of Stone").

At dawn, Esmeralda is tied to a pyre outside Notre Dame. Frollo sentences her to death, offering her one last chance to save herself, which she angrily rejects. He orders her pyre to be lit. Quasimodo swings down on a rope from the bell tower and takes Esmeralda back to Notre Dame, invoking Notre Dame's status as a sanctuary in an appeal for protection. Frollo orders the Cathedral Guard to retake the church by force. Clopin frees Phoebus, after which the two rally the people of Paris to fight against the guards. However, the guards still manage to break in. Quasimodo dumps the molten lead used for fixing the bells onto the guards to stop them. Esmeralda thanks Quasimodo for being a good friend before dying from smoke inhalation. Frollo enters and asks Quasimodo if she is dead, which he broken-heartedly confirms. Relieved, Frollo tells Quasimodo that they are finally free of her poison. Quasimodo angrily throws Frollo off the tower of Notre Dame to his death.

Devastated, Quasimodo realizes that everyone he has ever loved is now dead. Phoebus arrives, finding out about Esmeralda's death. Phoebus tries to carry her body away but is unable to due to his injuries. Quasimodo then carries Esmeralda away.

The actor playing Quasimodo breaks character and addresses the audience, explaining that years later, two skeletons were discovered in the crypts of Notre Dame, one holding the other in its arms. The first skeleton had a woven band around its neck, while the second had a crooked spine. When an attempt was made to separate them, the latter crumbled to dust. The company then turns to the audience, repeating the question posed at the beginning of the show: "What makes a monster, and what makes a man?" ("Finale").

== Musical numbers ==
Act I

- "Olim" – Congregation
- "The Bells of Notre Dame" – Clopin, Frollo, Jehan, Father Dupin, Quasimodo, Congregation
- "Sanctuary" ^{1} – Frollo, Quasimodo
- "Out There" – Quasimodo
- "Topsy Turvy (Part 1)" – Clopin, Quasimodo, Gypsies, Congregation
- "Rest and Recreation" – Phoebus, Soldiers, Frollo
- "Rhythm of the Tambourine" – Esmeralda, Clopin, Phoebus, Frollo, Quasimodo
- "Topsy Turvy (Part 2)" – Clopin, Congregation
- "Sanctuary II" ^{2} – Frollo, Quasimodo
- "The Bells of Notre Dame (Reprise)" ^{2} − Esmeralda, Congregation
- "God Help the Outcasts" – Esmeralda, Congregation
- "Top of the World" – Esmeralda, Quasimodo, Statues, Gargoyles
- "The Tavern Song (Thai Mol Piyas)" – Esmeralda, Frollo, Clopin, Gypsies
- "Heaven's Light" – Quasimodo
- "Hellfire" – Frollo, Congregation
- "Esmeralda" –Official, Frollo, Phoebus, Madame, Quasimodo, Soldiers, Congregation

Act II

- "Entr'acte" – Congregation
- "Flight Into Egypt" – Saint Aphrodisius, Quasimodo, Statues, Gargoyles
- "Esmeralda (Reprise)" ^{3} – Frollo
- "Rest and Recreation (Reprise)" ^{3} – Phoebus, Quasimodo
- "The Court of Miracles" – Clopin, Gypsies
- "In a Place of Miracles" – Phoebus, Esmeralda, Quasimodo, Clopin, Gypsies
- "The Bells of Notre Dame (Reprise II)" ^{4} – Congregation
- "Someday" – Esmeralda, Phoebus
- "While the City Slumbered" – Congregation
- "Made of Stone" – Quasimodo, Statues, Gargoyles
- "Judex Crederis" ^{5} − Congregation
- "Kyrie Eleison" ^{5} − Frollo, Phoebus, Quasimodo, Congregation
- "Top of the World (Reprise)" ^{5} − Esmeralda
- "Esmeralda (Frollo Reprise)" ^{5} − Frollo, Congregation
- "Finale Ultimo" ^{5} – Frollo, Quasimodo, Florika, Clopin, Congregation

Notes
^{1} Included as part of "Out There" on Studio Cast Recording
^{2} Combined on Studio Cast Recording into one song titled "Into Notre Dame"
^{3} Not present on Studio Cast Recording
^{4} Titled "Justice in Paris" on Studio Cast Recording
^{5} Combined on Studio Cast Recording into one song titled "Finale"
Many changes were made to the score when the production transferred from San Diego to Millburn, including cutting the song "In My Life," sung following "God Help the Outcasts" by Esmeralda and Phoebus

== Versions ==
=== Der Glöckner von Notre Dame ===
Alan Menken noted that "some songs complement the original composition of the film" while "others are very different from the film compositions and extend the musical spectrum", making a special mention of a song in Act II which was inspired by traditional Roma music. Translator Michael Kunze "campaign[ed] to allow Esmeralda to die at the end, as she does in the book. There was a feeling that the audience would be depressed if Esmeralda dies. I feel that a European audience would see this as a very romantic ending ... two lost souls finally find each other. People will cry, but they'll be moved." The producers wanted to see how preview audiences reacted before making the final decision. The set for the production utilized many large hydraulically controlled boxes that can be placed at any height, onto which projections were used in every scene for scenery and effects. The finale of act one shows Phoebus' plummet from a bridge over the Seine after being shot by an arrow.

=== The Hunchback of Notre Dame ===
"These characters all come together, all with purpose, all trying to do the right thing facing extraordinary obstacles... We don't offer a solution, but we go to this place that you or others may call dark, that I would call life."

— Thomas Schumacher, interview with State of the Arts NJ for the 2015 Paper Mill Playhouse production of Hunchback.

The English adaptation incorporates most of the score of Disney's Hunchback. "The Bells of Notre Dame" is rewritten to include Frollo's past as a priest as well as his relationship with his brother Jehan before becoming the cathedral's archdeacon. The gargoyles, Victor, Hugo, and Laverne (Charles, Antoine, and Loni in the Berlin production), who are the comic relief in the 1996 movie, are cut. Some of the original characters from the novel are added, as well as songs such as "The Tavern Song", "Rhythm of the Tambourine", "Flight into Egypt" and "In a Place of Miracles". The score uses musical leitmotifs; each of the central characters has a theme drawn from one of the songs ("Out There" for Quasimodo, "God Help the Outcasts" for Esmeralda, "Hellfire" for Frollo, and "Rest and Recreation" for Phoebus). "The Bells of Notre Dame" acts as a narrative device to tell parts of the story. Thomas Schumacher, president of the Walt Disney Theatrical, noted that the English adaptation of the musical embraced darker elements of the original source material by Victor Hugo.

After Michael Arden, who played the role of Quasimodo in this version, read the book and discovered that Quasimodo is deaf from bell-ringing, he incorporated this aspect into his character. Quasimodo speaks with a "strangled slur", rather than his pure voice in the movie. He relies on a form of sign language that he has invented; the statues of Notre Dame articulate his imagined thoughts, providing insight into his mindset, as a Greek chorus. While singing, Quasimodo ignores the disability, especially when he is alone, illustrating that the character does not see his deformities. The ending, proposed by director Scott Schwartz, is inspired by the novel. Menken and Schwartz felt that having a live choir on stage was integral in achieving the full-bodied sound they had crafted for the film, and James Lapine gave them his blessing in tinkering with his book for the stage version.

== Critical reception ==
Der Glöckner von Notre Dame

Matt Wolf of Variety said, "The prevailing tone, indeed, is far and away the most somber of the three Disney film-to-stage shows yet." He wrote that "the design is likely to be the show's talking point in any language, coupling as it does the best of British and American talent with a new $100 million dollar-plus playhouse specifically adapted to accommodate the demands of the piece. The aquamarine stage curtain, Gothic tracery already encoded within it, rises to reveal set designer Heidi Ettinger's ever-shifting array of cubes that join with Jerome Sirlin's projections to conjure the medieval world of the Parisian belltower inhabited by Sarich's misshapen orphan Quasimodo, his unyielding master Frollo (Norbert Lamla) and a trio of very chatty gargoyles."

The Hunchback of Notre Dame

The English version of the musical received positive reviews. The New York Daily News wrote, "This stage musical smartly excises comic relief from the film's giggling gargoyles...The look of the show is also very good. Alexander Dodge's lavish bell-tower, Alejo Vietti's gritty period costumes and Howell Binkley's dynamic lights lend to the atmosphere." The New York Times deemed it a "surprising[ly] self-serious...polished but ponderous musical" with a "simultaneously impressive and oppressive" stage and "rich choral singing." The Hollywood Reporter said "Menken's uncommonly complex, classically-influenced score often soars." AM New York called the musical "an unusually dark and chilling piece of musical theater which explores physical deformity, religious extremism, sexual repression and even genocide."

Hunchback received various local awards and 10 Tommy Tune awards from 15 nominations, 6 Kenny Award nominations, 13 Blue Star Award nominations, 10 Tune Awards, 15 Freedy Award nominations and 8 wins, 6 Blumey Award nominations, one Annual Pierrot Award, and 7 TBA awards. The Danish version received 3 award nominations.

== Principal cast ==
Character	Berlin	San Diego	Millburn
Character	1999	2014	2015
Quasimodo	Drew Sarich	Michael Arden	Michael Arden
Esmeralda	Judy Weiss	Ciara Renée	Ciara Renée
Claude Frollo	Norbert Lamla	Patrick Page	Patrick Page
Phoebus	Fredrik Lycke	Andrew Samonsky	Andrew Samonsky
Clopin	Jens Janke	Erik Liberman	Erik Liberman
Charles	Valentin Zahn	—N/a	—N/a
Loni	Yvonne Ritz Andersen	—N/a	—N/a
Antoine	Tamàs Ferkay	—N/a	—N/a
The Archdeacon	Carlo Lauber	—N/a	—N/a
Lt. Frederic Charlus	—N/a	Ian Patrick Gibb	Ian Patrick Gibb
Jehan Frollo	—N/a	Lucas Coleman	Jeremy Stolle
Florika	—N/a	Samantha Massell	Samantha Massell
St. Aphrodisius	—N/a	Neal Mayer	Neal Mayer

== Cast albums ==
The Hunchback of Notre Dame (Studio Cast Recording)

Soundtrack album cast recording by Various
- Released: January 22, 2016
- Studios: Avatar (New York, New York)
- Length: 1:19:55
- Label: Ghostlight Records

=== Germany (1999) ===
A German-language cast album was released in 1999.

=== United States (2015) ===
Paper Mill cast released a cast recording of the show. Recorded at Avatar Studios, the album features a 25-piece orchestra, with a 32-strong choir. The recording was released by Ghostlight Records in January 2016. The cast album was released to critical and commercial acclaim. It debuted at number one on Billboard's Cast Albums chart upon its release, thereby ending the 17-week run of Hamilton on this list.

Chart	Peak position
Cast Albums Sales	1
Top Album Sales	17
Billboard 200	47

=== Germany (2017) ===
A second German-language cast album was released in September 2017. M1 Musical wrote that from the first notes of Olim in the German recording, the reviewer was given goosebumps; they ultimately deemed it a "masterpiece – the diamond in the CD shelf."

=== Austria (2023) ===
The first complete live recording performed in German by the original Vienna cast was released in December 2023.
