= The Bells of Notre Dame =

Song by Paul Kandel, David Ogden Stiers and Tony Jay

from the album The Hunchback of Notre Dame: An Original Walt Disney Recording
- Released: May 28, 1996
- Length: 6:26
- Label: Walt Disney
- Composer: Alan Menken
- Lyricist: Stephen Schwartz
- Producers: Alan Menken; Stephen Schwartz

"The Bells of Notre Dame" is a song from the 1996 Disney film The Hunchback of Notre Dame, composed by Alan Menken, with lyrics by Stephen Schwartz. It is sung at the beginning of the film by the clown-like gypsy, Clopin, who serves as the narrator of the film. It is set mainly in the key of D minor. The lyrics of the song bear some similarity to the poem The Bells by Edgar Allan Poe, especially the repetition of the word "bells" during the crescendo. The song is reprised at the end of the film.

The music is based on Prelude in C-sharp minor Op. 3 No. 2 by Sergei Rachmaninoff, which is sometimes colloquially referred to as "The Bells of Moscow".

== Production ==
The origin of this song came with the controversial swap made by Disney executives of Claude Frollo from an Archdeacon to a Minister of Justice. One of the side effects of this was that a backstory had to be fabricated to explain what Frollo was doing caring for Quasimodo in the first place. The notion that "Frollo is encouraged by the Archdeacon of Notre Dame to raise Quasimodo as his own, to atone for killing the baby's gypsy mother" on the stairs of the church had to be explained in the opening scene of the musical, and that was the catalyst for the song's creation. Disney Voice Actors: A Biographical Dictionary explains that "the opening sequence of [the film] was originally all narration and the result was deemed too lifeless so ['The Bells of Notre Dame'] was written".

Alan Menken said "It's a really rich number and I think it's possibly the best opening number I've ever written for any project".

== Visual sequence ==
The song details Quasimodo's origin and serves as the film's opening credits.

During the song, Clopin starts to tell a group of young children about the story of Notre Dame's mysterious bell-ringer, described as "a tale of a man, and a monster." Twenty years earlier, a group of gypsies attempted to ferry their way into Paris and travel to the Court of Miracles (where the gypsies live), but were ambushed by Frollo and several soldiers. When the only woman amongst the gypsies is seen carrying a bundle, one of Frollo's guards attempts to confiscate it, prompting her to flee. Frollo pursues her on his horse, thinking her bundle contains stolen goods, in an intense chase through the streets that comes to a head on the steps of Notre Dame. The woman bangs on the door pleading for sanctuary, but Frollo catches up to her before anyone can answer.

Frollo grabs the bundle from her, but in doing so strikes a blow to her head with his boot, causing her to fall down onto the stone steps, breaking her neck and killing her instantly. Frollo discovers that the bundle is actually a deformed baby boy. Horrified by the child's appearance, he spots a well nearby and attempts to drown the baby he sees as a demon from Hell, but is stopped by the Archdeacon, who admonishes Frollo for killing an innocent woman on holy ground and then trying to kill a defenseless baby. Frollo callously tries to dismiss his actions, but the Archdeacon doesn't believe him and declares that no amount of lying will hide what he has done from "the eyes of Notre Dame" (belonging to the decorative statues built into the structure and used as a metaphor for God and His Angels).

Fearing for his immortal soul, Frollo nervously asks what he must do to atone for his sins and the Archdeacon replies that he must raise the orphaned child as his own. Frollo reluctantly agrees on the condition that the baby remains hidden in the bell tower of Notre Dame, hoping that one day the child may be of some use to him, and gives the child a cruel name; Quasimodo, which, according to Clopin, means "half-formed". Clopin ends the song with a riddle: "Who is the monster and who is the man?" And as he does, he uses puppetry to show Quasimodo growing up until he reached 20 years of age. The scene then shifts to the real Quasimodo ringing the bells.

== Themes ==
The film itself, like most Disney Renaissance films, contains valuable moral information and so, in a way, can be called a "teaching story", besides being entertainment. This is one function of stories that are told to children: to give them, at least, the basic understanding of attitudes and behaviors encountered in the real world. Through the story of the song, Clopin tells the children that it is a tale of "a man and a monster". Towards the end he gives them a riddle for them to guess whilst being told the rest of the story, that being: "Who is the monster and who is the man?", thus introducing the major theme of the film. What is meant by these words is to get behind what often are merely appearances, and by doing so we get to the actual truth. This aspect of the story can be related to real life because people often make the error of mistaking appearances (that also may be false) for the real thing or for something else entirely. In the beginning "the picture explicitly compares the [otherness] of Quasimodo to the righteousness of Frollo", playing on the stereotype that Quasimodo's deformities make him the monster, while his master Frollo is the man due to his sleeker looks. It is implied by the end of the film, however, that it is now indeed a paradox and reversal of the statement attributed to the two personalities, not by their physical appearances. Singing the reprise of the song, Clopin gives a girl a new riddle: "What makes a monster and what makes a man?", stating that Quasimodo is the man because of his humble kindness and selfless bravery, while Frollo is deemed to be the monster because of his selfishness, cruelty, and intolerance.

The work Mouse Morality: The Rhetoric of Disney Animated Film by Annalee R. Ward argues that the use of a play-within-a-play technique used in this opening number "enables the filmmakers to condense some of the story, telling us the setting instead of showing it". It adds that symbolically, Clopin's puppet show is a metaphor for what Disney has done to the original source material, having "reduced it to manipulated entertainment, ala 'tragedy lite'".

== Critical reception ==
DVD Talk says that "The Bells of Notre Dame" and "Out There" "set... a perfect tone" for the film, which fumbles later with the "Be Our Guest"-esque "A Guy Like You". Mouse Morality: The Rhetoric of Disney Animated Film says it is a "dark, emotional scene". Disney Voice Actors: A Biographical Dictionary describes the number as "one of the most potent musical openings of any Disney film". The Oxford Companion to the American Musical: Theatre, Film, and Television says the song "combines character and narrative beautifully".

== See also ==
- The Hunchback of Notre Dame (soundtrack)
