= A Guy Like You =

Song by Charles Kimbrough, Mary Wickes, Mary Stout, and Jason Alexander

from the album The Hunchback of Notre Dame: An Original Walt Disney Records Soundtrack
- Released: 1996
- Recorded: 1996
- Length: 2:54
- Label: Walt Disney
- Composer: Alan Menken
- Lyricist: Stephen Schwartz
- Producers: Alan Menken; Stephen Schwartz

"A Guy Like You" is a song from Disney's 1996 film The Hunchback of Notre Dame. It is performed by the three gargoyles as they try to console Quasimodo. The song was also featured in the German stage musical version, but was replaced with "Flight into Egypt" for the North American stage production.

== Production ==
Stephen Schwartz explained that the songwriters were not sure about the assignment, but agreed to it, noting that it turned into "A Guy Like You", which made it into the final film.

Mary Wickes, the voice actress for the gargoyle Laverne, was sick with the illness that led to her death during some re-recordings of the song. While Jane Withers voiced Laverne's remaining dialogue, Broadway actress Mary Stout provided additional re-recorded singing.

== Synopsis ==
According to The Washington Post, "the song encourages Quasi in his wrongheaded pursuit of Gypsy dancer Esmeralda."

== Composition ==
The song has "Broadway pizazz". It has been described as "sprightly" and "this show's answer to 'Be Our Guest'." Indianapolis Star describes it as a "peppy tune of encouragement".

== Tone difference with rest of film ==
The song was added in the film to add some levity after "the intensity of Hellfire" which is followed by Frollo "go[ing] on a tear extorting Gypsies, arresting people, attempting to kill people including Phoebus and burning a good portion of Paris."

Their song was described as a "funny, upbeat song" sung by "comic relief" characters.

Hi-Def Digest said that "at times, the movie is dark, serious and mature, but then it switches into being goofy and comedic", citing scenes with the gargoyles and this song in particular. It added that it's as if the film "didn't trust itself [and] want[ing] to straddle two boats by making a movie that appealed to adult audiences as well as children." It concluded that "unfortunately, most children don't like this movie and it is almost ignored by the Walt Disney Company."

We Debate: The Surprising Bleakness of Disney's The Hunchback of Notre Dame notes that "Beyond the joking reference to the burning city around them in 'A Guy Like You', the song is mostly bright and cheery, but, again, that is on the surface. The song is ultimately poignant and tragic because the audiences knows Quasimodo's love is unrequited, and are quickly proven correct as Quasimodo has to watch Esmeralda and Phoebus make out like there is no tomorrow."

== Home releases ==
A three-minute multi-language reel of the song "A Guy Like You" is featured on the Blu-ray DVD.

== Critical reception ==
Much like the gargoyles' role in the film, the song has received mainly mixed reviews. While the song's production, as well as Kimbrough, Alexander and Wickes' vocal performances were well received, its jarring dissonance with the tone of the rest of the film, as well as its historical anachronisms and shallow message, have been criticized for being too "campy" and "out of place" when compared to the darker, more mature themes of the film.

Den of Geek said "the 'A Guy Like You' sequence seems ill-fitting" and "offsets [the film's] darkness a little too much." The Taste of Rising Bile said "Not only is 'A Guy Like You' a pretty bad song that doesn't fit in with the rest of the film, it also massively sets Quasimodo up for a fail. The grotesques convince him that Esmeralda's in love with him, which she's not. There's building up self-confidence and then there's just being cruel."

Fonsbandusiae23 said "I'm sure a lot of people would agree with me when I say that you could take 'A Guy Like You' out of the soundtrack and let it drop into that fiery pit Frollo was ranting about, and we would rejoice and not mind one little bit."

The Hunchblog simply said "I hate this song." It notes "It's interesting, the movie's moral is about looking beyond superficiality but this song really only talks about his looks not how amazing or kind or even talented he is." It added "The song has some good musicality, it's sung well, and it has some clever lyrics but it's annoying." It also greatly criticized the anachronisms used in the number.

We Debate: The Surprising Bleakness of Disney's The Hunchback of Notre Dame said "Imagine if in The Lion King the song "Hakuna Matata" was sung over images of the ruined remnants of Pride Rock, and you have a general idea of how the song 'A Guy Like You' from Hunchback plays." The Oxford Companion to the American Musical: Theatre, Film, and Television said the three gargoyle voice actors "hammed it up" with this song.

Cinefantastique described "A Guy Like You" as "likable but intrusive"; the only song in the film that fails to "enhanc[e] the story without stopping the flow". Show Music mirrored this view by arguing that all the film's songs "fits the story line without wrenching it out of shape, which 'A Guy Like You' does."

The Wall Street Journal described the number as "one of the funniest musical numbers I've ever seen...the blithely sardonic style evokes the best of the Broadway musical stage, and the content, given Quasi's multiple disabilities, takes your breath away."
