= Paul Kandel =

American actor (born 1951)

- Born: February 15, 1951 (age 75); Queens, New York, U.S.
- Occupations: Actor, singer
- Years active: 1981–2002
- Notable work: Voice of Clopin Trouillefou in Disney's The Hunchback of Notre Dame (1996)

Paul Kandel (born February 15, 1951) is an American musical theatre actor and tenor singer. He is best known for his film role in Disney's The Hunchback of Notre Dame (1996) as the voice of the Roma leader Clopin Trouillefou.

He also has appeared on Broadway a number of times, having appeared in Jesus Christ Superstar as King Herod, Titanic, The Who's Tommy, and The Visit. Kandel received a nomination for the 1993 Tony Award for Best Performance by a Featured Actor in a Musical for his portrayal of Uncle Ernie in The Who's Tommy.

== Career ==
In 1997, he performed in Ron Daniels's version of the play One Flea Spare.

== Performances ==
=== Stage ===
Year	Title	Role	Venue	Ref.
1992	The Visit	Pastor, Doctor Nusslin, Egg Man	Criterion Center Stage Right, New York City	
1993	The Who's Tommy	Uncle Ernie	St. James Theatre, New York City	
1997	One Flea Spare	Kabe	The Public Theater, New York City	
1998	Titanic	J. Bruce Ismay	Lunt-Fontanne Theatre, New York City	
2000	Jesus Christ Superstar	King Herod	Ford Center for the Performing Arts, New York City	

=== Screen ===
Year	Title	Role	Ref.
1981	Full Moon High	Fireman	
1992	Fool's Fire	Minister Torello	TV movie
1992	Law & Order	Reporter #2	Episode: "The Working Stiff"
1995	The Client	Vernon Tebbert	Episode: "Pilot"
1996	The Hunchback of Notre Dame	Clopin Trouillefou (voice)	
1996	Disney's Animated Storybook: The Hunchback of Notre Dame	Clopin Trouillefou (voice)	Video game
1996	Disney Sing-Along Songs: Topsy Turvy	Clopin Trouillefou (voice)	Video short
1998	Buster & Chauncey's Silent Night	Duke of Raoche (voice)	Video
2000	Sally Hemings: An American Scandal	Pierre Du Pont	TV movie
2002	The Hunchback of Notre Dame II	Clopin Trouillefou (voice)	Video
