= Gary Trousdale =

American film director

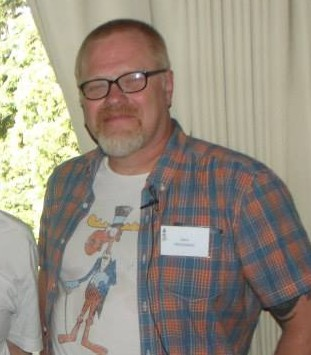
- Trousdale at the 2014 Annecy International Animated Film Festival
- Born: Los Angeles, California, U.S.
- Occupations: Animator; film director; screenwriter; storyboard artist
- Years active: 1982–present
- Employer(s): Walt Disney Feature Animation (1984–2003); DreamWorks Animation (2003–2019)

Gary Trousdale is an American animator, film director, screenwriter and storyboard artist. He is best known for directing films such as Beauty and the Beast (1991), The Hunchback of Notre Dame (1996), and Atlantis: The Lost Empire (2001). He frequently works with Kirk Wise and Don Hahn.

== Biography ==
Trousdale was raised in La Crescenta, north of Glendale, California. He had planned to be an architect, but had failed at math. Instead, he had decided to study animation at CalArts, where he studied for three years. After his studying, he applied to work as an animator for Carter/Mendez Productions. He was hired in 1982 to design storyboards and do other animation. He then went to work designing restaurant menus and T-shirts.

Trousdale was hired by Walt Disney Productions in 1984 as an in between effects animator on The Black Cauldron (1985). Trousdale then worked as a storyboard artist on Oliver & Company (1988) and The Little Mermaid (1989). It was on the former film Trousdale became re-acquainted with Kirk Wise, his future collaborator. Wise recalled, "Gary and I actually met at CalArts in my first year, that would've been 1981 ...We didn't cross paths again until I was at Disney. I worked at the end of The Great Mouse Detective, I got laid off for a year and came back in '87/'88 on Oliver & Company in the story department and that's where Gary and I started working together."

While working on The Rescuers Down Under (1990), Trousdale and Wise were fired from the project due to creative differences, most particularly after their desire to have an Aboriginal Australian child actor hired to voice Cody was ignored. They both moved to Orlando, Florida to the Disney-MGM Studios where they developed a Roger Rabbit short film titled Buggy Buggy Blunder, which told of Baby Herman's stroller getting away from Roger while they were out in the city. Their pitch was rejected by the studio's management. Trousdale and Wise then directed the animated opening sequence for Cranium Command, an attraction ride at the Walt Disney World Resort's EPCOT Center. Trousdale explained, "...there was a shakeup on the directorial side... they said you guys go, that's how we got put together."

In 1988, Richard Purdum had been hired to direct Beauty and the Beast (1991). A storyboard reel was screened for Jeffrey Katzenberg, to which he strongly disapproved declaring it was too dark and dramatic. As a result, in December 1989, Purdum amicably resigned as director. At the time, Trousdale and Wise were developing Goofy of the Apes, a spoof of Tarzan of the Apes starring Goofy. Trousdale and Wise received a phone call from Charlie Fink, the studio's vice president of creative affairs, requesting they board "a plane next Monday for New York". Recalling their success on Cranium Command, Katzenberg had been considered them as potential candidates to direct the film. Both men met with Katzenberg, Howard Ashman, Peter Schneider, Don Hahn, and Linda Woolverton to begin overhauling the story, and subsequently flew back to Glendale. Within three months, they served as acting directors before they became the film's official directors. As directors, Trousdale directed the live-action reference footage and supervised the layout and special effects, while Wise supervised the character animation and character cleanup. Both directors nevertheless were involved in the art direction, storyboarding, voice recording, editing, and background design.

Beauty and the Beast was released to critical acclaim, and by February 1992, it became the first animated film to gross $100 million in North America alone. The film was subsequently nominated for an Academy Award for Best Picture, becoming the first animated film to achieve this feat. That same month, Trousdale and Wise helped to rewrite The Lion King (1994), working alongside Hahn, Roger Allers, Brenda Chapman, and Chris Sanders to conceive a new story outline in two days. For about a year, Trousdale and Wise developed Song of the Sea, an animated retelling of the Greek myth of Orpheus and Eurydice but with humpback whales. However, in 1993, both directors received a phone call from Katzenberg, telling them: "'Guys, drop everything—you're working on Hunchback now.'"

The Hunchback of Notre Dame (1996) reunited most of the production team that had worked on Beauty and the Beast (1991), with the inclusion of two Parisian-based animators Paul and Gaëtan Brizzi. Together, they embarked to create a more complex, literary, and sophisticated film than its predecessor. During the film's production, in November 1995, Trousdale and Wise signed a long-term contract extension with Disney. Upon release, the film earned $325 million worldwide, though it received a mixed response from film critics.

In October 1996, Trousdale, Wise, Hahn, and screenwriter Tab Murphy decided their next film should be an action-adventure film during lunch at a Mexican restaurant. The resulting film became Atlantis: The Lost Empire, released in 2001. Prior to the film's release, Trousdale and Wise were developing a theatrical sequel, which would have told of another attempted re-take of Atlantis, in which Milo Thatch and his crew battle Helga Sinclair. These plans were later shelved after the film had disappointed at the box office, earning $186 million worldwide. After Atlantis was released, Trousdale was attached to direct Gnomeo & Juliet (2011) as his first solo project. Kate Winslet, Ewan McGregor, and Judi Dench had been hired to voice the principal characters. In June 2003, after Michael Eisner had raised concerns about the project's commercial appeal, Trousdale was dismissed from the project after developing creative differences with David Stainton, the studio's then-Feature Animation president.

Trousdale later moved to DreamWorks Animation in 2003, where he worked as a storyboard artist on Madagascar (2005) and Flushed Away (2006). He then directed several animated specials, including The Madagascar Penguins in a Christmas Caper (2005), Shrek the Halls (2007), and Scared Shrekless (2010). In 2010, he was nominated for an Annie Award for Outstanding Achievement for Directing in a Television Production for the latter special. In 2014, he directed the animated short Rocky and Bullwinkle.

== Filmography ==
| Year | Film | Position | Notes |
|---|---|---|---|
| 1985 | The Black Cauldron | In between effects artist | |
| 1985 | My Science Project | Effects animator | |
| 1985 | Homania | Character Designer / Animator | |
| 1988 | Oliver & Company | Story | |
| 1989 | The Little Mermaid | Storyboard artist | |
| 1989 | Cranium Command | Opening Sequence Director | |
| 1990 | The Rescuers Down Under | Storyboard artist | |
| 1990 | The Prince and the Pauper | Storyboard artist | |
| 1991 | Beauty and the Beast | Director | Co-directed with Kirk Wise |
| 1992 | Aladdin | Pre-production Story Development: CGI | |
| 1994 | The Lion King | Story | |
| 1996 | The Hunchback of Notre Dame | Director / Old Man (voice) | Co-directed with Kirk Wise |
| 2001 | Atlantis: The Lost Empire | Director / Story | Co-directed with Kirk Wise |
| 2005 | Madagascar | Storyboard artist | |
| 2005 | The Madagascar Penguins in a Christmas Caper | Director | Short film |
| 2006 | Flushed Away | Additional story artist | |
| 2007 | Shrek the Halls | Director / Teleplay / Santa (voice) | |
| 2008 | Kung Fu Panda | Special Thanks | |
| 2010 | Megamind | Special Thanks | |
| 2010 | Scared Shrekless | Director / Teleplay | Television film |
| 2011 | Thriller Night | Director | |
| 2011 | The Pig Who Cried Werewolf | Director | |
| 2014 | Mr. Peabody & Sherman | Story artist | |
| 2014 | Rocky and Bullwinkle | Director | Direct to video short |
| 2016 | Floyd Norman: An Animated Life | Himself | |
| 2017 | Beauty and the Beast | Creative consultant | |

== Bibliography ==
- Thomas, Bob (1991). Disney's Art of Animation: From Mickey Mouse to Beauty and the Beast. New York: Hyperion. ISBN 1-56282-899-1.
