= Quasimodo =

Character in The Hunchback of Notre-Dame

- The Hunchback of Notre-Dame character
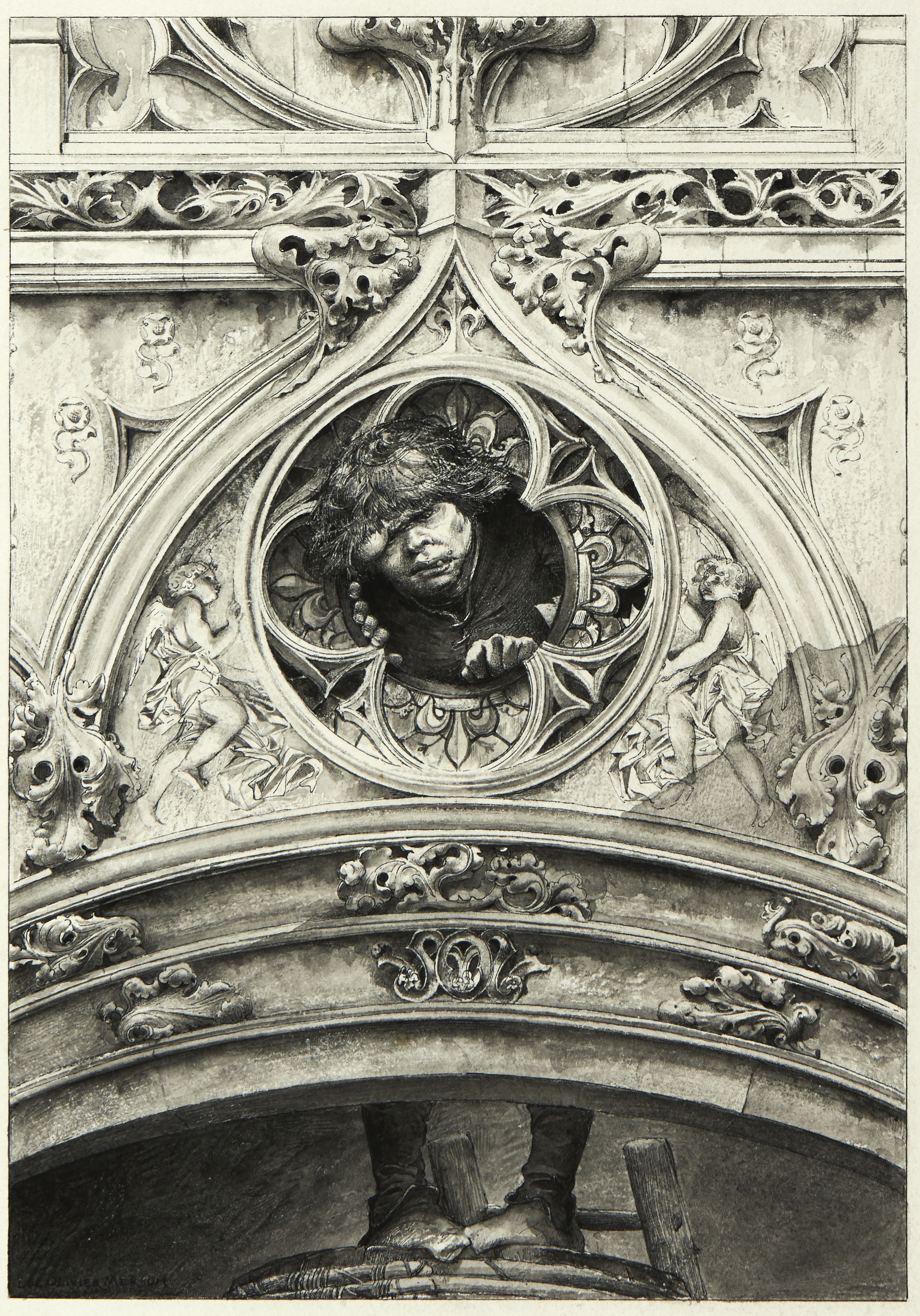
- Quasimodo by Luc-Olivier Merson (1889).
- First appearance: The Hunchback of Notre Dame (1831)
- Created by: Victor Hugo
- Portrayed by: Lon Chaney, Charles Laughton, Anthony Quinn, Mandy Patinkin
- Voiced by: Tom Burlinson, Tom Hulce

In-universe information
- Nickname: The Hunchback of Notre Dame
- Species: Human
- Gender: Male
- Occupation: Bell-ringer of the Notre-Dame Cathedral
- Family: Claude Frollo (adoptive father)
- Religion: Catholic
- Nationality: French Romani

Quasimodo (/ˌkwɑːzɪˈmoʊdoʊ/ KWAH-zee-MOH-doh; from Quasimodo Sunday) is the titular protagonist of the French novel The Hunchback of Notre-Dame (1831) by Victor Hugo. Born with numerous deformities, most notably a hunched back, Quasimodo serves as the bell-ringer for Notre Dame cathedral in fifteenth century Paris. Although his appearance causes others to treat him cruelly, he ultimately finds sanctuary in an unlikely love that is fulfilled only in death.

The role of Quasimodo has been played by many actors in film adaptations, including Lon Chaney (1923), Charles Laughton (1939), Anthony Quinn (1956), and Anthony Hopkins (1982). In addition, he was voiced by Tom Hulce in a Disney animated feature (1996); was parodied by Steve Lemme in the comedy Quasi (2023); and most recently was portrayed by Angelo Del Vecchio in a revival of the French-language musical Notre Dame de Paris.

In 2010, a British researcher found evidence suggesting there was a real-life hunchbacked stone carver who worked at Notre Dame during the same period Victor Hugo was writing the novel and they may have even known each other.

== In the novel ==
The deformed Quasimodo is described as "hideous" and a "creation of the devil". He was born with a severe hunchback, a bushy eyebrow covering his left eye while the right eye "disappeared entirely" behind a giant wart, and broken teeth, one of which protruded over his mouth. He was born to a tribe of Romani people, but due to his monstrous appearance he was switched during infancy with an able-bodied baby girl, Agnes. One character in the novel refers to him as animalistic and un-Christian, suggesting he may be the "offspring of a Jew and a sow", and thus deserving of death. After being discovered, Quasimodo is exorcised by Agnes's mother (who believed that the Romani people ate her child) and taken to Paris. He is found abandoned in Notre Dame (on the foundlings' bed, where orphans and unwanted children are left to public charity) on Quasimodo Sunday, the First Sunday after Easter (probably April 20, as Quasimodo was 20 years old when the story begins (1482) and Esmeralda 16, meaning he was 4 when switched, leaving 1466 as the year in which he is abandoned and adopted, accordingly with the Computus, that year's Easter would fall on April 13, making Quasimodo Sunday the 20^{th}), by Claude Frollo, the Archdeacon of Notre Dame, who adopts the baby, names him after the day the baby was found, and brings him up to be the bell-ringer of the cathedral. Due to the loud ringing of the bells, Quasimodo also becomes deaf causing Frollo to teach him sign language.

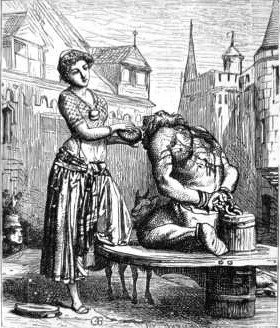
"A tear for a drop of water" Esmeralda gives a drink to Quasimodo in one of Gustave Brion's illustrations

Looked upon by the general populace of Paris as a monster, he believes that Frollo is the only one who cares for him, and frequently accompanies him when the Archdeacon walks out of Notre Dame. Frollo lusts after a beautiful Romani girl named Esmeralda, and enlists Quasimodo in trying to kidnap her. (She is later revealed to be Agnes, the baby with which Quasimodo was switched.) Captain Phoebus de Châteaupers arrives to stop the kidnapping and captures Quasimodo, unaware that Quasimodo was merely following Frollo's orders. The deaf judge Florian Barbedienne sentences him to an hour of flogging and another hour of humiliation on the pillory. Quasimodo is tied up and Pierre Torterue whips him in front of a jeering crowd. When Quasimodo calls to him for help, Frollo allows Quasimodo to be tortured as punishment for failing him. When Quasimodo calls for water, a child throws a wet rag at him. Seeing his thirst, Esmeralda approaches the public stocks and offers him a drink of water. It saves him and she captures his heart.

Esmeralda is later entangled in an attempted murder – committed by Frollo, who had stabbed Phoebus in a jealous rage after spying on Esmeralda and Phoebus having a night of passion – and is sentenced to be hanged. As she is being forced to pray at the steps of Notre Dame just before being marched off to the gallows, Quasimodo, who has been watching the occasion from an upper balcony in Notre Dame, slides down with a rope, and rescues her by taking her up to the top of the cathedral, where he poignantly shouts "Sanctuary!" to the onlookers below.

Esmeralda is terrified of Quasimodo at first, but gradually recognizes his kind heart and becomes his friend. He watches over her and protects her, and at one point saves her from Frollo when the mad priest sexually assaults her in her room. In one instance Esmeralda also sees Phoebus from the cathedral balcony and pleadingly convinces Quasimodo to go down and look for him, but Phoebus is repulsed by Quasimodo's appearance and refuses to visit Notre Dame to see her.

After an uneasy respite, a mob of Paris's Truands led by Clopin Trouillefou storms Notre Dame, and although Quasimodo tries to fend them off by throwing stones and bricks down onto the mob and even pours deadly molten lead, the mob continues attacking until Phoebus and his soldiers arrive to fight and drive off the assailants. Unbeknownst to Quasimodo, Frollo lures Esmeralda outside, where he has her arrested and hanged. When Quasimodo sees Frollo smiling cruelly at Esmeralda's execution, he turns on his master and throws him to his death from the balcony in rage.

Quasimodo cries in despair, lamenting "There is all that I ever loved!" He then leaves Notre Dame, never to return, and heads for the Gibbet of Montfaucon beyond the city walls, passing by the Convent of the Filles-Dieu, a home for 200 reformed prostitutes, and the leper colony of Saint-Lazare. After reaching the Gibbet, he lies next to Esmeralda's corpse, where it had been unceremoniously thrown after the execution. He stays at Montfaucon, and eventually dies of starvation, clutching the body of the deceased Esmeralda. Years later, an excavation group exhumes both of their skeletons, which have become intertwined. When they try to separate them, Quasimodo's bones crumble to dust.

=== Symbolism ===
In the novel, Quasimodo symbolically shows Esmeralda the difference between himself and the handsome yet self-centered Captain Phoebus, with whom the girl has become infatuated. He places two vases in her room: one is a beautiful crystal vase, yet broken and filled with dry, withered flowers; the other a humble pot, yet filled with beautiful, fragrant flowers. Esmeralda takes the withered flowers from the crystal vase and presses them passionately on her heart.

== Adaptations ==
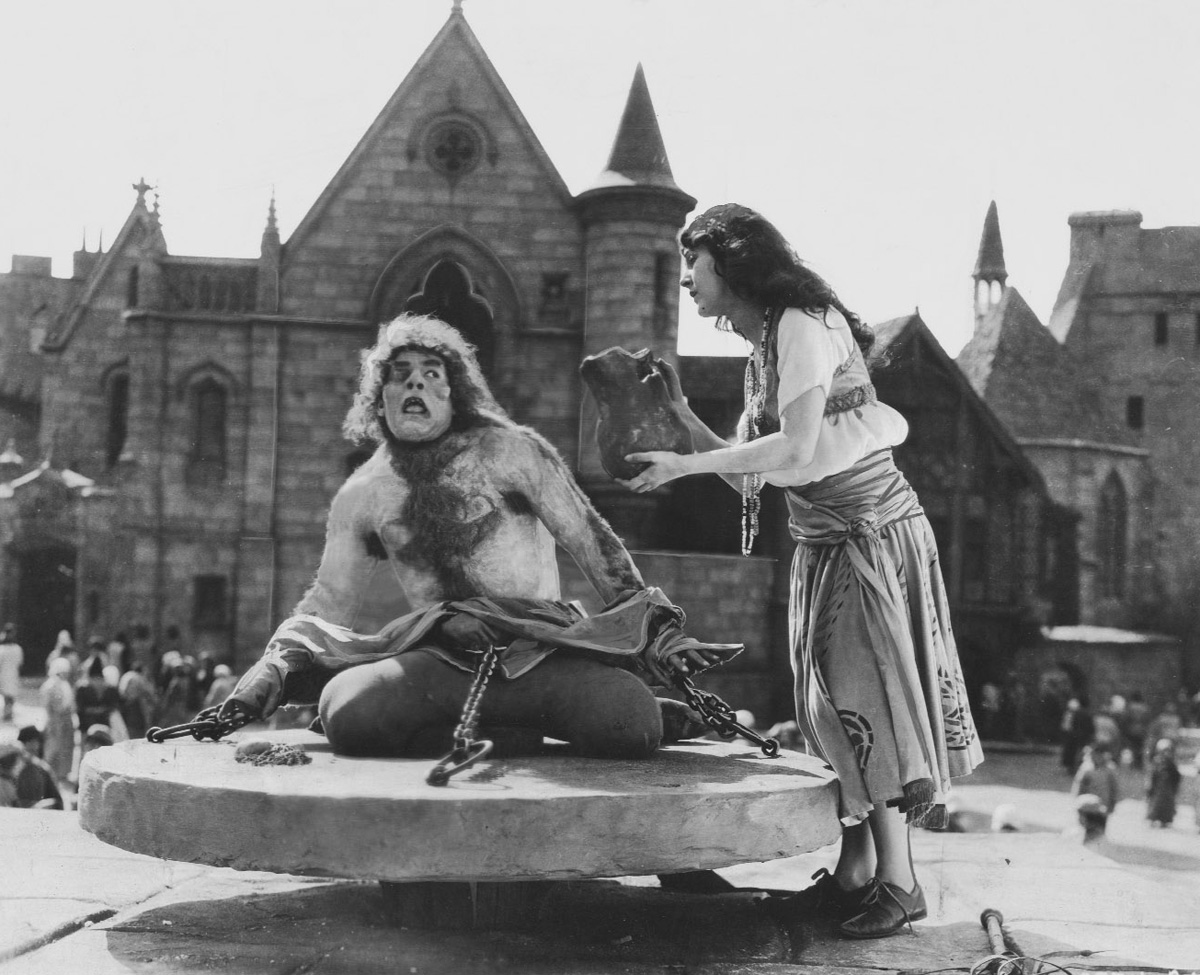
Lon Chaney as Quasimodo, Patsy Ruth Miller as Esmeralda in the 1923 film, The Hunchback of Notre Dame

Among the actors who have played Quasimodo over the years in each adaptation of the novel are:

| Actor | Version |
|---|---|
| Henry Vorins | 1905 film |
| Henry Krauss | 1911 film |
| Glen White | The Darling of Paris (1917 film) |
| Booth Conway | 1922 film |
| Lon Chaney | 1923 film |
| Charles Laughton | 1939 film |
| Anthony Quinn | 1956 film |
| Peter Woodthorpe | 1966 TV show |
| Warren Clarke | 1977 TV film |
| Anthony Hopkins | 1982 TV film |
| Tom Burlinson (voice) | 1986 animated film |
| Ocean Software (studio) | Super Hunchback (1992 video game) |
| Daniel Brochu (voice) | The Magical Adventures of Quasimodo (1996 cartoon TV show) |
| Tom Hulce (voice) | 1996 animated Disney film |
| Mandy Patinkin | 1997 TV film |
| Pierre "Garou" Garand | Notre Dame de Paris (1997–2000) |
| Rodrigo "Igo" Fomins | Notre-Dame de Paris (1997 operatic melodrama) |
| Niks Matvejevs | Notre-Dame de Paris (1997 operatic melodrama) |
| Patrick Timsit | Quasimodo d'El Paris (1999 parody film) |
| Drew Sarich | Der Glöckner von Notre Dame (1999 musical) |
| David Bower (voice) | 2008 BBC Radio adaptation |
| Michael Arden | 2014–2015 musical |
| Angelo Del Vecchio | Notre Dame de Paris revival (2012–present) |

=== Disney version ===
==== In the first film ====
In Disney's 1996 animated film adaptation of The Hunchback of Notre Dame, Quasimodo is a very different character than in the novel. He was voiced by Tom Hulce and animated by James Baxter. Unlike in the novel, Quasimodo has two eyes, with his left one only partially covered. He is not deaf, and is capable of fluent speech. He has three anthropomorphic gargoyle friends named Victor, Hugo, and Laverne. The changes begin with how he became a ward of Claude Frollo; while in the novel, he is abandoned on the steps of Notre Dame, in the film that is where his mother is killed while protecting him.

In the beginning of the film, a Romani mother tries to bring the hunchbacked infant into Notre Dame with her for sanctuary, but the antizigan Judge Claude Frollo (Tony Jay) chases and inadvertently kills her. Frollo attempts to drown the baby in a nearby well upon seeing his deformity, but the church's Archdeacon stops him and demands that he atone for his crime by raising the child as his son. Fearing God's wrath, Frollo reluctantly agrees, and adopts the child in the hope that he will be useful to him one day. Frollo cruelly names the child Quasimodo, which in the film is Latin for "half-formed". Over the years he raises Quasimodo with cruelty, forbidding him to leave the tower and teaching him that the world is a wicked, sinful place, and that the Parisian people will reject him due to his deformity. He also lies to Quasimodo about his mother, telling him she abandoned him as a baby and that anybody else would have drowned him had Frollo not stepped in and adopted him. Quasimodo nevertheless grows up to be a kind-hearted young man who yearns to join the outside world.

Quasimodo sneaks out of the cathedral during the Festival of Fools, where he is crowned the "King of Fools". While there, he meets Esmeralda, with whom he falls in love. Two of Frollo's guards ruin the moment by throwing tomatoes at him and binding him to a wheel to torment him, rousing a crowd of onlookers to join in. Frollo refuses to help as punishment for his disobedience. Esmeralda takes pity on him and frees him after Phoebus fails to get Frollo to intervene. After Esmeralda escapes, Frollo confronts Quasimodo, who apologizes and returns to the bell tower. He later befriends Esmeralda when she claims sanctuary from Frollo in the cathedral, and he helps her flee from Frollo's men in gratitude. Though saddened to see that Esmeralda has romantic love for Captain Phoebus rather than himself, Quasimodo cares for her enough to learn to respect her choice.

Frollo eventually locates Esmeralda and Phoebus at the Court of Miracles. He sentences Esmeralda to death, and has Quasimodo chained up in the bell tower. Quasimodo breaks free, however, and rescues Esmeralda from execution. Phoebus breaks free from his cage and rallies the citizens of Paris against Frollo's tyranny. From the bell tower, Quasimodo and the gargoyles watch the citizens fighting Frollo's army. They pour molten lead onto the streets, preventing Frollo and his soldiers from breaking in. However, Frollo successfully manages to enter the cathedral. He tries to kill Quasimodo, who is mourning Esmeralda, believing her to be dead. The two struggle briefly until Quasimodo throws Frollo to the floor and denounces him, finally seeing him for what he is. Esmeralda awakens and Quasimodo rushes her to safety. He then fights the wrathful Frollo, who reveals the truth about his mother to him. Both fall from the balcony, but Phoebus catches Quasimodo and pulls him to safety, while Frollo falls to his death. Quasimodo is finally accepted into society by the citizens of Paris as they celebrate the liberation of the city from Frollo.

==== In the second film ====
In Disney's 2002 direct-to-video sequel, The Hunchback of Notre Dame II, Quasimodo (again voiced by Hulce) reappears, once again as the protagonist. He remains a bell-ringer, still living in Notre Dame with the gargoyles. This time, he is able to move around Paris freely. He finds love in a beautiful circus performer named Madellaine (voiced by Jennifer Love Hewitt), who ultimately reveals that she is aware that the gargoyles are alive. His love for Madellaine is briefly strained when he learns she was actually working on behalf of a greedy magician named Sarousch who plans to steal a particularly valuable bell called La Fidele, from Notre Dame. Madellaine's true feelings for Quasimodo overcome her reluctant loyalty to Sarousch, however, and she aids Quasimodo in bringing Sarousch to justice. Quasimodo forgives Madellaine and the two pledge their love to each other.

==== Later appearances ====
- Quasimodo also made some occasional appearances on the animated series House of Mouse. At one point, Jiminy Cricket, when giving advice to the guests, consoles him by saying that some people find someone special and some people do not, poking fun at the fact that Quasimodo and Esmeralda did not fall in love at the end of the original film.
- Quasimodo is a very rare meetable character at the Disney Parks and Resorts, but can be seen as a figure inside Clopin's Music Box in Fantasyland.
- A German musical stage show Der Glöckner von Notre Dame (1999) derived from the Disney movie, restores some of the darker elements of the original novel lost in the film: Esmeralda dies from smoke inhalation at the end, Frollo is revealed to have once been a priest in his past (akin to the novel, where he was an archdeacon), and Frollo dies because Quasimodo throws him from the roof rather than falling by accident.
- Quasimodo appears in the video game Kingdom Hearts 3D: Dream Drop Distance voiced by Ari Rubin. He appears as a supporting character in a world based on the film called "La Cité des Cloches" and plays out more or less the same role as in the film.
- In 2014 at the La Jolla Playhouse, Disney premiered a new adaptation of The Hunchback of Notre Dame. Like the 1999 German Adaptation, the new adaptation was based on movie but it restored some of the themes, characters, and ending of Hugo's original book. It later transferred to PaperMill Playhouse in 2015. The musical also establishes Quasimodo as Frollo's nephew - Jehan runs off with a Gypsy girl, Florika, after being expelled from Notre Dame's sanctuary. Years later, Frollo receives a letter from him and finds him on his deathbed. It is revealed Florika had died from pox and Jehan eventually dies from it as well, entrusting his brother with his son even though he is an established Gypsy child.
- Quasimodo appears in the video game Disney Magic Kingdoms as a playable character to unlock for limited time.
- Quasimodo appears in the 2023 live-action/animated short Once Upon a Studio with Tom Hulce returning to voice him.

== Real-life Quasimodo ==
In August 2010, Adrian Glew, a Tate archivist, announced evidence for a real-life Quasimodo, a "humpbacked [stone] carver" who worked at Notre Dame during the 1820s. The evidence is contained in the memoirs of Henry Sibson, a 19th-century British sculptor who worked at Notre Dame at around the same time Hugo wrote the novel. Sibson describes a humpbacked stonemason working there: "He was the carver under the Government sculptor whose name I forget as I had no intercourse with him, all that I know is that he was humpbacked and he did not like to mix with carvers." Because Victor Hugo had close links with the restoration of the cathedral, it is likely that he was aware of the unnamed "humpbacked carver" nicknamed "Le Bossu" (French for "The Hunchback"), who oversaw "Monsieur Trajin". Adrian Glew also uncovered that both the hunchback and Hugo were living in the same town of Saint Germain-des-Prés in 1833, and in early drafts of Les Misérables, Hugo named the main character "Jean Trajin" (the same name as the unnamed hunchbacked carver's employee), but later changed it to "Jean Valjean".
