= Kirk Wise =

American film director

- Born: San Francisco, California, U.S.
- Occupations: Film director; animator; screenwriter; producer
- Years active: 1985–present

Kirk Wise is an American film director, animator and screenwriter best known for his work at Walt Disney Animation Studios. Wise has directed Disney animated films such as Beauty and the Beast (1991), The Hunchback of Notre Dame (1996), and Atlantis: The Lost Empire (2001). He also directed the English-language translation of Hayao Miyazaki's Spirited Away (2001). He frequently works with Gary Trousdale and Don Hahn.

== Career ==
Wise graduated from Palo Alto High School and went on to study character animation at California Institute of the Arts. Early in his career, Wise worked as an animator on Disney's Sport Goofy in Soccermania (1987), The Great Mouse Detective (1986) and The Brave Little Toaster (1987), as well as Steven Spielberg's Amazing Stories episode "Family Dog".

Returning to Walt Disney Feature Animation, he began work on The Great Mouse Detective (1986) as an assistant animator, but eventually joined the story department, where he was reunited with former CalArts classmate, Gary Trousdale.

After working as storyboard artists on The Rescuers Down Under and The Prince and the Pauper, Wise and Trousdale were responsible for helming the celebrated Beauty and the Beast (1991), the first animated feature to be nominated for an Academy Award for Best Picture.

Wise, a known fan of Hayao Miyazaki, was brought in by Disney to supervise the North America release of Spirited Away along with John Lasseter.

== Filmography ==
Title	Year	Role
The Great Mouse Detective	1986	Assistant animator
Amazing Stories	1987	Principal animator (1 episode)
Sport Goofy in Soccermania	1987	Animator
The Brave Little Toaster	1987	Animation director (development)
Oliver & Company	1988	Writer, animating assistant
Cranium Command	1989	Voice of Hypothalamus, opening sequence director
The Rescuers Down Under	1990	Storyboard artist
The Prince and the Pauper	1990	Storyboard artist
Beauty and the Beast	1991	Director, creative consultant (uncredited)
Homeward Bound: The Incredible Journey	1993	Executive producer
The Lion King	1994	Additional story material
The Hunchback of Notre Dame	1996	Director
Atlantis: The Lost Empire	2001	Director, story
Spirited Away	2002	Director, ADR Director (U.S. production)
Open Season	2006	Special thanks
Oceans	2009	Executive Producer: Disneynature
Waking Sleeping Beauty	2009	Himself, caricaturist
2012 Disney History Connections: Colonial America	2012	Director (short)
Chimpanzee	2012	Creative consultant
Aldabra: Once Upon an Island	2015	Creative consultant
Beauty and the Beast	2017	Creative consultant
Bobbleheads: The Movie	2020	Director
Paws of Fury: The Legend of Hank	2022	Additional voices
