= The Hunchback of Notre Dame (1986 film) =

- VHS cover art
- Directed by: Geoff Collins
- Screenplay by: Eddy Graham
- Based on: The Hunchback of Notre-Dame by Victor Hugo
- Produced by: Tim Brooke-Hunt
- Starring: Tom Burlinson; Angela Punch McGregor; Ron Haddrick
- Edited by: Eddy Graham; Caroline Neave
- Music by: Wilfred Lehmann
- Production company: Burbank Animation Studios
- Distributed by: Image Entertainment (United States); The Rank Organisation (United Kingdom)
- Release dates: 27 August 1986 (United States and Australia)
- Running time: 52 minutes
- Countries: Australia; United States
- Languages: English; French; Spanish

The Hunchback of Notre Dame is a 1986 Australian/American fantasy animated film and an adaptation of the 1831 novel The Hunchback of Notre-Dame by Victor Hugo.

== Summary ==
Claude Frollo is attempting alchemy, but his thoughts of Esmeralda, a Roma dancer, hinder his concentration. He informs Quasimodo, his hunchbacked and deaf servant, that he needs him to assist in kidnapping Esmeralda. In the Paris streets is the poet Gringoire, who also pines for Esmeralda, and laments his dilemma through poetry. Esmeralda herself passes by, and Quasimodo tries to kidnap her under Frollo's orders. Gringoire tries to save her, but is knocked to the ground instead. Esmeralda is successfully rescued by Captain Phoebus, who has the hunchback arrested, while Frollo escapes. Esmeralda takes a liking to Phoebus, and remarks on the beauty of his name when he leaves.

Gringoire is chased by faux cripples into the Court of Miracles, the den of beggars and thieves. Clopin, the king of the Gypsies, decides to hang Gringoire. Gringoire, to avoid death, has to perform a test, which he quickly fails. He is then offered to women to avoid hanging. Esmeralda marries him, but only out of pity. The next day, the archbishop visits Frollo in his laboratory and informs him that Quasimodo has been arrested. Frollo refuses to testify at the trial, using the false excuse of not wanting to disgrace the church. At the Palis de Justice, the deaf judge assumes he is being mocked, as Quasimodo is unable to properly answer the judge's questions, and sentences him to a flogging. Quasimodo is whipped, and mocked by the people around him. He begs for water, and Esmeralda gives him some. She performs tricks with her goat Djali, but stops in order to pursue Phoebus. Later, at the inn, Esmeralda is reunited with Phoebus, but only a short while after this, he is stabbed by Frollo. Esmeralda is blamed and arrested. At her trial, she is accused of sorcery. Charmalou manages to have Djali perform a trick, which is used as damning evidence against her.

She is sentenced to burn at the stake. Frollo offers her to come with him into the cathedral so he can have the responsibility of cleansing her soul. Esmeralda sees through this lie and says that she "would prefer to die" than be with him; plus, she sees an alive Phoebus who is passing near the crowd but does not react, therefore she is persuaded that Phoebus does not love her, and prefers to die. Before the execution can proceed, Quasimodo swoops down, snatches Esmeralda, and saves her, crying "sanctuary" over and over. Frollo curses both Esmeralda and "the deformed monster (he) adopted and raised all of these years".

Quasimodo pours his heart out to Esmeralda, and she begins to pity him, apologizing for "judging (him) ugly because of (his) face". The next day, Frollo visits Esmeralda when she is alone. He offers himself to her once more, but Esmeralda rejects his advances. Frollo pulls out a dagger, with the intent of killing Esmeralda. Quasimodo stops him, and Frollo leaves, saying that if he can't have Esmeralda then no other man will.

Enraged townspeople then attack the cathedral, wanting to hang Esmeralda, but Quasimodo defends her and the church. Frollo grabs Esmeralda, trying to push her off the roof: Quasimodo runs to her aid, and throws Frollo off the roof to his death. Down below, Phoebus makes his way through the crowd: the people are amazed to see that he is alive, he proves Esmeralda's innocence, saying that it was Frollo who had stabbed him and the gypsy "has commuted no sin in her entire life, except to be born beautiful". Esmeralda says that Quasimodo is "the most beautiful and innocent man who was ever born", so that a touched Quasimodo walks off to a gargoyle, looking into the sunset.

== Voice cast ==
- Tom Burlinson as Quasimodo
- Angela Punch McGregor as Esmeralda
- Ron Haddrick as Frollo
- Richard Meikle
- Phillip Hinton
- Ric Hutton
