= The Hunchback of Notre Dame (1939 film) =

1939 film by William Dieterle

- Theatrical poster
- Directed by: William Dieterle
- Screenplay by: Sonya Levien; Bruno Frank (adaptation)
- Based on: The Hunchback of Notre-Dame; 1831 novel by Victor Hugo
- Produced by: Pandro S. Berman
- Starring: Charles Laughton; Cedric Hardwicke; Thomas Mitchell; Maureen O'Hara; Edmond O'Brien; Alan Marshal; Walter Hampden
- Cinematography: Joseph H. August A.S.C.
- Edited by: William Hamilton; Robert Wise
- Music by: Alfred Newman (musical adaptation and original composition)
- Production company: RKO Radio Pictures
- Distributed by: RKO Radio Pictures
- Release date: December 29, 1939
- Running time: 116 minutes
- Country: United States
- Language: English
- Budget: $1,826,000
- Box office: $3,155,000

The Hunchback of Notre Dame (1939) by William Dieterle, trailer

The Hunchback of Notre Dame is a 1939 American romantic drama film starring Charles Laughton and Maureen O'Hara. Directed by William Dieterle and produced by Pandro S. Berman, the film is based on Victor Hugo's 1831 novel. It is also noted for being the only film shown at the newly established Cannes Film Festival; the rest of the festival was cancelled due to the start of World War II.

== Plot ==
In Paris during the late Middle Ages, Louis XI, the King of France, and Frollo, his Chief Justice of Paris, visit a printing shop. Frollo is determined to do everything in his power to protect Paris from anything he sees as evil, including the printing press and Romani. That day is Paris' annual celebration, the Feast of Fools. Pierre Gringoire, a poor street poet, does a play in front of an audience until it is interrupted by Clopin, the King of the Beggars. Esmeralda, a young gypsy girl, is seen dancing in front of an audience of people. Quasimodo, the deaf hunchback and bell ringer of Notre Dame Cathedral, is crowned the King of Fools until Frollo catches up to him and takes him back to the church.

Esmeralda is caught by a guard and seeks safety in Notre Dame. She prays to the Virgin Mary to help her fellow Romani but is then confronted by Frollo, who accuses her of being a heathen. Frollo then takes her up to the bell tower where they encounter Quasimodo. As she runs from the hunchback, Frollo commands Quasimodo to chase and kidnap her. Gringoire witnesses this and calls to Captain Phoebus and his guards who capture Quasimodo just in time and save Esmeralda. Quasimodo is sentenced to be lashed in the square and publicly humiliated afterward. He asks the Parisian townspeople for water, which Esmeralda gives him.

Later that night, Frollo appears at a gathering where Esmeralda is performing and confesses his lust for her. Frollo then catches her and Phoebus sharing a moment in the garden. Frollo kills Phoebus out of jealousy and sentences Esmeralda to death for the crime, saying that she has "bewitched" him. Just as she is about to be hanged, Quasimodo saves her by taking her to the cathedral and claiming the right of sanctuary.

When Gringoire and Clopin realize the nobles are planning to revoke Notre Dame's right of sanctuary, they each execute a different method in order to save Esmeralda from hanging: Gringoire writes a pamphlet, and Clopin leads the beggars to storm the cathedral. At the Palace of Justice, King Louis realizes the pamphlet is creating public opinion, which can influence kings to make decisions. King Louis is informed of Notre Dame's attack and that Esmeralda is innocent. King Louis demands to know who the real murderer is, upon which Frollo admits his crime and storms out. King Louis orders Olivier to arrest Frollo and then speaks to Gringoire after reading his pamphlet. Quasimodo and the guards of Paris defend Notre Dame from the attack by Clopin and the beggars. Frollo attempts to kill Quasimodo in the bell tower with a dagger but Quasimodo disarms him and proceeds to throw Frollo from the top of the cathedral, sending him to his death.

Later that morning, King Louis pardons Esmeralda and the other Romani. She leaves the public square with her true love, Gringoire, among a cheering crowd. Quasimodo observes this from atop the cathedral and asks a gargoyle, "Why was I not made of stone, like thee?"

== Cast ==
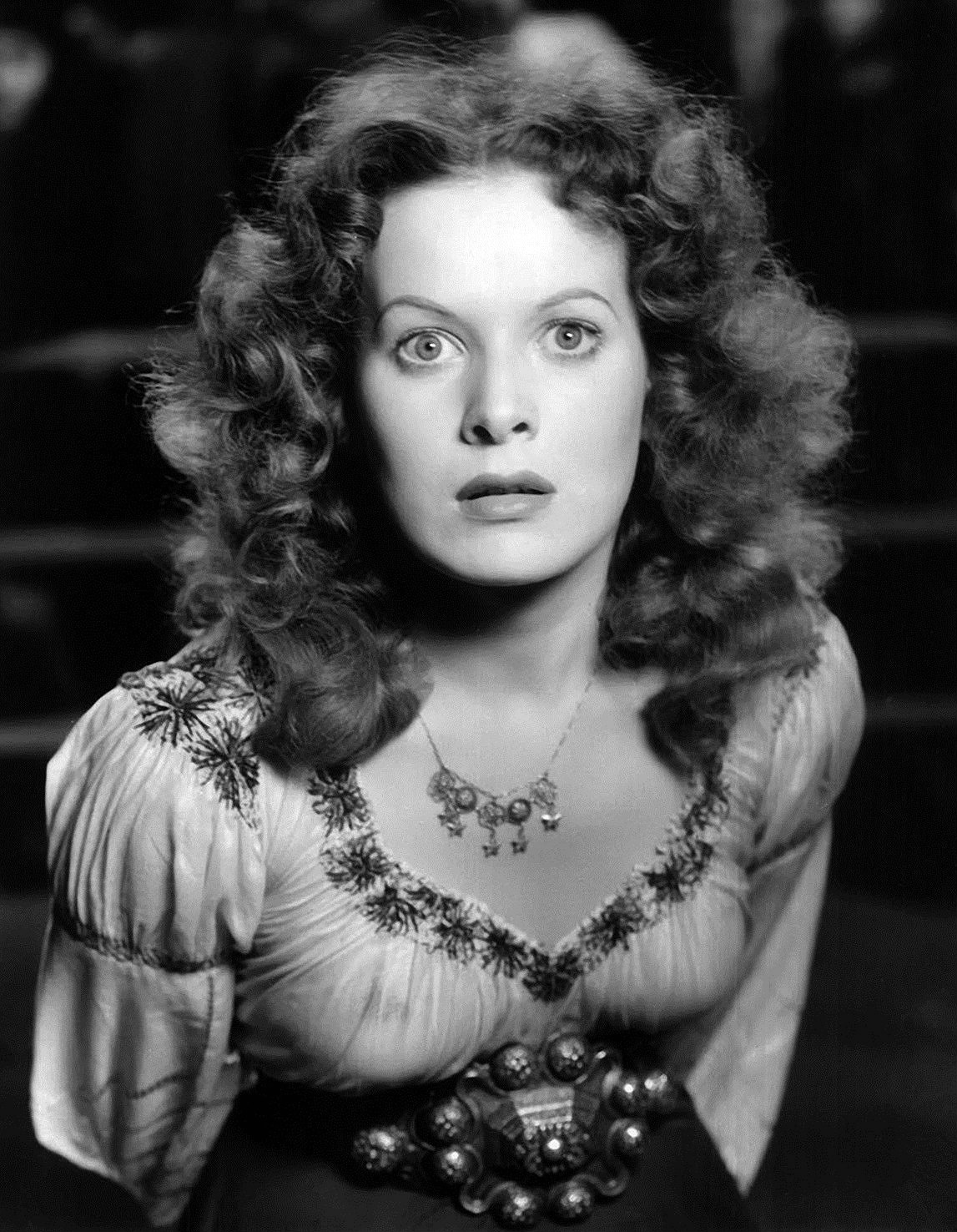
Maureen O'Hara as Esmeralda

- Charles Laughton as Quasimodo
- Cedric Hardwicke as Frollo
- Thomas Mitchell as Clopin
- Maureen O'Hara as Esmeralda
- Edmond O'Brien as Gringoire
- Alan Marshal as Phoebus
- Walter Hampden as Archdeacon
- Harry Davenport as King Louis XI
- Katharine Alexander as Madame de Lys
- George Zucco as Procurator
- Fritz Leiber as Old Nobleman
- Etienne Girardot as Doctor
- Helene Whitney as Fleur de Lys
- Mina Gombell as Queen of Beggars
- Arthur Hohl as Olivier
- Curt Bois as Student
- George Tobias as Beggar-Hangman
- Rod La Rocque as Phillippe
- Spencer Charters as Court Clerk
- Kathryn Adams as Fleur's Companion
- Dianne Hunter as Fleur's Companion
- Siegfried Arno as Tailor
- Peter Godfrey as Monk (uncredited)
- Rondo Hatton as Ugly Man (uncredited)
- Paul Newlan as Whipper (uncredited)

== Production ==
In 1932, it was reported by The Hollywood Reporter that Universal announced that it would remake the 1923 Hunchback of Notre Dame film with John Huston writing a script and that Boris Karloff would play Quasimodo.

Irving Thalberg, who was an uncredited producer in the 1923 film, considered remaking the film in 1934 and even discussed the idea with Charles Laughton. Two years later, Universal regained interest in a remake, with a fan poll being instrumental in influencing the studio to make the film. Ronald Colman, Paul Muni, Fredric March, Lionel Barrymore and Peter Lorre were the choices in the poll and in the end, Universal decided to go with Lorre, even as far as negotiating with the actor to star in the film, but the project never materialized.

A year later, Carl Laemmle Jr. persuaded Metro-Goldwyn-Mayer to buy the property from Universal as a star-vehicle for Muni. Metro refused and sold the rights to RKO, with Pandro S. Berman producing and William Dieterle directing.

For this production, RKO Radio Pictures built on their movie ranch a massive medieval city of Paris and Notre Dame Cathedral in the San Fernando Valley. This was one of the largest and most extravagant sets ever constructed.

Screenwriter Sonya Levien, who was entrusted to translate Hugo's novel into this film, made the story relevant to the events of the time the film was made: she made the obvious parallel between Paris' persecution of the Romani and Germany's treatment of the Jews prior to World War II.

=== Casting ===
After hearing the news that RKO was going to remake the 1923 film, Lon Chaney Jr. sought to play the role of Quasimodo and screen-tested for the studio. While the studio felt that Chaney gave excellent performances in his numerous screen tests, other actors would be more suitable for the part, with Orson Welles, who would later mark his film debut with Citizen Kane, being one of the many considered. Laughton was set to star as Quasimodo, but RKO offered Chaney the role when it seemed that the British actor would be unable to work in America due to troubles with the IRS. Laughton, however, managed to overcome his problems and secured the role.

Pleased with her work on Alfred Hitchcock's Jamaica Inn, Laughton brought a then 18-year-old Maureen O'Hara to Hollywood to play Esmeralda. This marked O'Hara's American screen debut. According to actress Kathryn Adams, she was to play Esmeralda, but lost the role to O'Hara when Laughton cabled from Ireland to Hollywood that he was "bringing Esmeralda". Adams played a companion of Fleur as compensation for losing the role.

Dieterle wanted Claude Rains to play Frollo but, before he agreed, he had an unexpected encounter with Laughton on the Universal lot in which Laughton was very condescending. Rains, who had mentored Laughton and John Gielgud at the Royal Academy of Dramatic Arts, later remarked that their encounter at the lot was the end of their relationship and refused to play the role, which would go to Cedric Hardwicke.

=== Filming ===
With a budget of $1.8 million, Hunchback proved to be one of the most expensive films ever made by the studio. It was shot at the RKO Encino Ranch, with the interiors of the bell tower being shot at the Mudd Hall of Philosophy at the University of Southern California.

The sets of Paris and the Notre Dame Cathedral were constructed by Van Nest Polglase at the cost of $250,000 (about $4,974,622 in 2021 dollars), while Darrell Silvera worked as set decorator. Walter Plunkett oversaw the costume design and Joseph H. August served as cinematographer, this film being the first of his three collaborations with Dieterle.

Filming proved to be difficult for the cast and crew due to the hot temperatures, particularly for Laughton, who had to act with a lot of makeup. In her autobiography, O'Hara recalls one day arriving on the set and finding chimpanzees, baboons and gorillas. Dieterle wanted monks to be on the set but his assistant mistakenly thought he wanted monkeys because of his poor English and thick German accent.

Makeup artist Perc Westmore was loaned by Warner Bros. to RKO for the production. Westmore and Laughton did not get along. Though Westmore wanted to use sponge rubber to make a light appliance for Laughton to wear, Laughton wanted a heavy one to help him stay in character. Laughton was offended when Westmore suggested he try acting as though the hump were heavy and was rude and dismissive to Westmore throughout filming. Near the end of the shoot, Westmore called his younger brother to the studio, where he witnessed Westmore, while strapping on the hump, spray Laughton in the face with a seltzer bottle full of quinine water and then kick him in the posterior. Westmore told Laughton, "That's for all the grief you gave me" and added that his brother was a witness and would deny anything Laughton said about the incident.

When Poland was invaded by Nazi Germany on September 1, most of the cast and crew were in a state of fear. Laughton lightened the mood by reciting the Gettysburg Address (that he had recited in Ruggles of Red Gap). Another incident of emotional filming was the scene in which Quasimodo rings the bells in the tower of the cathedral for Esmeralda. Because his native Britain had declared war on Germany, Laughton rang the bells until he collapsed from exhaustion, overwhelming the crew with emotion.

=== Censorship ===
The characters of Claude Frollo and Jehan Frollo were changed from the novel, as in the 1923 film, because the filmmakers were concerned that portraying the priest as a villain would violate the policy of the Hays Production Code. In the novel, Claude is depicted as the villainous 36-year-old Archdeacon of Notre Dame; in the film, he is a good character and much older. His younger brother, Jehan, is a teenage, drunken student, as well as a juvenile delinquent, in the novel; in the film, he is the middle-aged villain who is also Paris' chief justice and a close advisor to King Louis XI.

== Reception ==
The review aggregator website Rotten Tomatoes reported that 93% of critics have given the film a positive review based on 14 reviews, with an average rating of 8.65/10. Variety called the film a "super thriller-chiller" but found that the elaborate sets tended to overwhelm the story, particularly in the first half. Harrison's Reports wrote, "Very good! Audiences should be thrilled anew by this lavish remake of Victor Hugo's famous novel." Film Daily called it "compelling, dynamic entertainment." John Mosher of The New Yorker wrote that Laughton "achieves something like a tour de force. The lines themselves (such modernisms as 'to buy protection'), along with a perfunctory plot arrangement, are among the weak features of the film, which otherwise is a vivid pictorial drama of fifteenth-century Paris." E. H. Harvey of The Harvard Crimson said that the film "in all is more than entertaining." He said that "the mediocre effects offer a forceful contrast to the great moments" in the film. However, Frank S. Nugent of The New York Times wrote a mostly negative review of the film, finding it "little more" than "a freak show". Though he acknowledged it was "handsome enough of production and its cast is expert," he called it "almost unrelievedly brutal and without the saving grace of unreality which makes Frankenstein's horrors a little comic."

The movie proved popular, earning $1,549,000 in the United States and Canada, and $1,646,000 elsewhere, but because of its cost only made a profit of $100,000.

== Awards and nominations ==
Award	Category	Nominee(s)	Result	Ref.
Academy Awards	Best Scoring	Alfred Newman	Nominated	
Academy Awards	Best Sound Recording	John O. Aalberg	Nominated	

The film is recognized by American Film Institute in these lists:

- 2002: AFI's 100 Years...100 Passions - #98

== Home media ==
The Hunchback of Notre Dame was released on DVD in Region 1 on September 21, 2001, by Image Entertainment. It was issued on Blu-ray in Region A by Warner Home Video on June 9, 2015, featuring the new high-definition digital transfer.
