= Esmeralda (1922 film) =

1922 film

- Directed by: Edwin J. Collins
- Written by: Victor Hugo (novel); Frank Miller
- Produced by: Master
- Starring: Sybil Thorndike; Booth Conway; Arthur Kingsley
- Release date: 1922
- Running time: 13 minutes
- Country: United Kingdom
- Languages: Silent film English intertitles

Esmeralda is a 1922 British silent film and an adaptation of the 1831 novel The Hunchback of Notre-Dame by Victor Hugo, with more emphasis on the character of Esmeralda rather than Quasimodo. It was directed by Edwin J. Collins and starred Sybil Thorndike as Esmeralda and Booth Conway as the hunchback. The film is considered lost, but extant still photos show a 40-year-old Thorndike who appears to be too old for the role of the young and virginal Esmeralda. This version emphasized romance and melodrama over horror.

The film was remade again in 1923 as The Hunchback of Notre Dame by Universal Pictures, starring Lon Chaney as Quasimodo, in what is considered the classic silent film version.

== Cast ==
- Sybil Thorndike as Esmeralda
- Booth Conway as Quasimodo
- Annesley Healy as Claude Frollo
- Arthur Kingsley as Captain Phoebus
