= Clopin Trouillefou =

- The Hunchback of Notre-Dame character
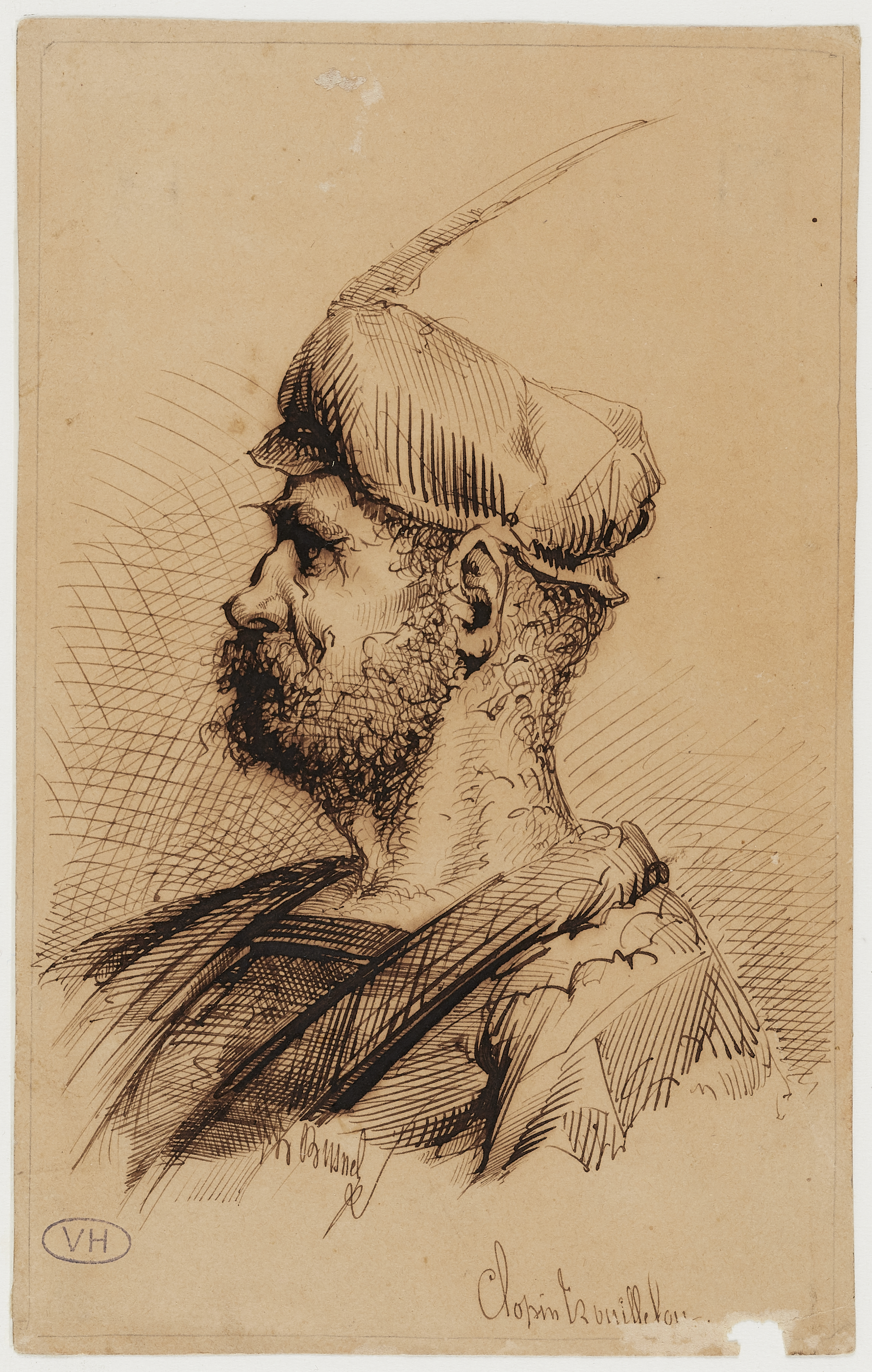
- Illustration by Théophile Busnel
- First appearance: The Hunchback of Notre-Dame; March 16, 1831
- Created by: Victor Hugo

In-universe information
- Gender: Male
- Nationality: French Romani

Clopin Trouillefou (French: [klɔ.pɛ̃ tʁuj.fu], literally "Lame Fear-Fool") is a fictional character first created in the 1831 novel The Hunchback of Notre-Dame by French author Victor Hugo, and subsequently adapted.

== In the novel ==
In the story, Clopin disrupts Pierre Gringoire's play, begging the audience for money. Later that night, Gringoire runs into him once again in the Court of Miracles, where Clopin is revealed not as a beggar, but as the King of Truands (the criminals and outcasts of Paris). He prepares to execute Gringoire for trespassing, until the beautiful Esmeralda agrees to marry him in order to save him. He is revealed to be a friend of Esmeralda's guardian, the Duke of Egypt, who is also one of the authority figures in his court.

Near the end of the novel, Clopin receives news of Esmeralda's upcoming execution for the framed murder of Captain Phoebus. In order to rescue her, he rounds all of the Truands to attack Notre-Dame de Paris cathedral where Esmeralda is protected by Quasimodo. In response to the assault, Quasimodo retaliates with stones, timber, and molten lead. Finally, the author notes that Clopin dies courageously during the attack.

== Adaptations ==
Among the actors who have played Clopin over the years in each adaptation of the novel are:

Actor	Version
John Webb Dillon	The Darling of Paris (1917 film)
Ernest Torrence	1923 film
Thomas Mitchell	1939 film
Philippe Clay	1956 film
Wilfrid Lawson (as King of the Beggars)	1966 TV series
Tony Caunter	1977 TV film
David Suchet	1982 TV film
Paul Kandel (voice)	1996 Disney animated film and its 2002 sequel
Jim Dale	1997 television film
Luck Mervil	1997-2002 musical
Dominique Pinon (as Trouillefou)	Quasimodo d'El Paris (1999 parody film)
Erik Liberman	2014 musical

== Disney version ==
Clopin
- First appearance: The Hunchback of Notre Dame (1996)
- Created by: Michael Surrey
- Voiced by: Paul Kandel

Clopin is also present in Disney's 1996 animated film adaptation of the story, in which he is more jovial and less sinister than in the novel. However, he is much darker, in clothing and humor, when Quasimodo and Captain Phoebus arrive in the Court of Miracles, suggesting his personality during the day to have been something of a façade. On the other hand, he is shown to have a gentle nature at the end of the film when he picks a little girl up and entertains her with a puppet resembling Judge Claude Frollo. Clopin's ending pitch of the song "The Bells of Notre Dame" has garnered incredible acclaim for its high D-note singing. He is voiced by Paul Kandel and animated by Michael Surrey. While he is mainly based on Clopin from the book, he is also similar to Pierre Gringoire from the book, having a similar physical appearance and being dressed like a jester (in the book, after joining the Romani, Pierre dresses like a fool when performing.)

As well as narrating the whole film, Clopin introduces the film and begins the story with the song "The Bells of Notre Dame," where he introduces the audience to the story by explaining how Quasimodo, the bell ringer from Notre Dame, ended up there. He also sings "Topsy Turvy" about the traditional Parisian "Feast of Fools," also known as Twelfth Night held every year on January 6.

Clopin wears two main costumes during the film: a jester suit (seen above), which he wears at the Festival of Fools; he also wears a similar costume in the catacombs, but it is almost completely purple with no gold trim, no mask, and no bells. During the song "The Court of Miracles," he also wears a lawyer's outfit, a judge's outfit (resembling Frollo's), and an executioner's outfit in quick succession.

As the movie's narrator, Clopin has a great deal of knowledge about Quasimodo's past, seemingly more than Quasimodo himself. This suggests that to know the whole story, throughout Paris he must have many contacts. Clopin's age is never estimated, so it is unknown if he was a child or at least old enough to hear about the murder of Quasimodo's mother.

Not only is Clopin the narrator in the story, but he is also the King of the Roma, who at the time were being rounded up and murdered in an act of "purification" by Frollo.

=== Original film ===
Clopin appears in the film five times. The first appearance is when Clopin sings "The Bells of Notre Dame," which tells the tale of how Frollo killed Quasimodo's mother, but was stopped by the Archdeacon before he could kill the infant Quasimodo by drowning him in a well.

The second appearance is at the Festival of Fools, where he acts as the Lord of Misrule, or master of ceremonies, sings "Topsy Turvy," a dance number that explains that it is "the day we do the things that we deplore on the other three-hundred-and-sixty-four." It is also during this song that he crowns Quasimodo the "King of Fools."

His third appearance is much later in the film, at the Court of Miracles, where a much darker side to his personality is shown. He and a large group of gypsies believe Quasimodo and Phoebus to be spies. They sing the song "The Court of Miracles" as Clopin puts Quasimodo and Phoebus on "trial" which includes a jury consisting of a puppet crafted in Clopin's likeness. He eventually finds them "totally innocent, which is the worst crime of all." He prepares to hang them, but Esmeralda arrives in time to stop him and tell the Romani of their good intentions, explaining how Phoebus rescued the miller and his family from being burned by Frollo and how Quasimodo helped her escape the cathedral. Clopin humorously asks why they didn't just say so. Phoebus informs the Roma people to leave, saying that Frollo knows of their hideout, a statement confirmed by Quasimodo, who was told of this by Frollo before. Realizing this, all the Travellers (including Clopin) agree and prepare to leave Paris, but unfortunately, Frollo arrives just in time to attack the Court of Miracles and Clopin is seen with his people struggling to break free from their bonds to no avail.

His fourth appearance is briefly during the climax of the film where Esmeralda is at the scaffold before Notre Dame. When Quasimodo rescues Esmeralda, Phoebus breaks free and rouses the civilians into action, inciting them to release the Roma and help them protect the cathedral from Frollo's soldiers. Clopin is seen jumping out of one of the many cages that hold the Romani freed by the civilians. Along with the civilians and French army, they attack Frollo's soldiers.

His fifth and final appearance is at the end, where Quasimodo is escorted out from the cathedral to be praised by the people for his actions. Having developed a newfound respect for Quasimodo, Clopin happily declares "Three cheers for Quasimodo!" He then sings a reprise of "The Bells of Notre Dame" while entertaining one of the young children as the civilians finally cheer Quasimodo, accepting him into their society.

=== Sequel ===
Clopin also appeared in the straight-to-video sequel, The Hunchback of Notre Dame II, as the host for the Festival of Love (Le Jour D'Amour, "the day of love"), although he is no longer the narrator and plays a much smaller role.

=== Stage Musical ===
Disney's Hunchback of Notre Dame musical premiered on American stages at La Jolla Playhouse in San Diego, California on October 28, 2014 and ran until December 7, 2014. It was followed by a run at Paper Mill Playhouse, which opened on March 4, 2015 in Millburn, New Jersey. Clopin was "perfectly portrayed" by Erik Liberman, who also performed the role on the Original Cast Recording.

== Park appearances ==
The Disney version of Clopin is a rare meetable character at the Disney Parks and Resorts, but can be seen as a figure inside Clopin’s Music Box in Fantasyland.
