= Esmeralda (The Hunchback of Notre-Dame) =

Fictional character from Victor Hugo's The Hunchback of Notre-Dame

- The Hunchback of Notre-Dame character
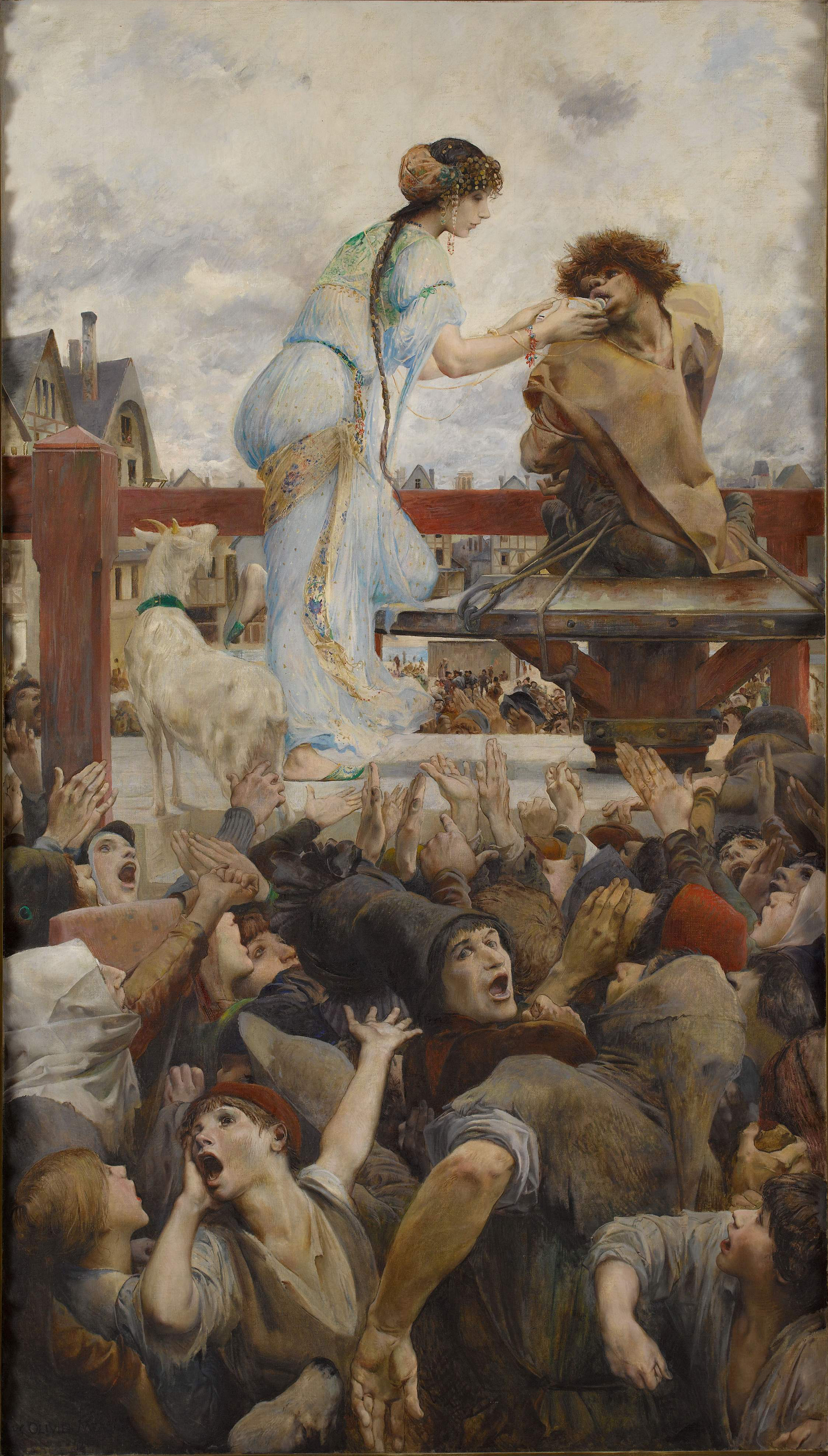
- Esmeralda gives water to Quasimodo tied to the pillory. A Tear for a Drop of Water by Luc-Olivier Merson (1903).
- First appearance: The Hunchback of Notre-Dame; March 16, 1831
- Created by: Victor Hugo

In-universe information
- Alias: Agnès (birth name)
- Occupation: Dancer
- Family: Paquette "la Chantefleurie" Guybertaut (mother); Djali (goat)
- Spouse: Pierre Gringoire
- Origin: Paris
- Nationality: French Romani

Esmeralda (French: [ɛs.me.ʁɑl.da]), born Agnès, is a fictional character in Victor Hugo's 1831 novel The Hunchback of Notre-Dame (French: Notre-Dame de Paris). She is a French Roma girl (near the end of the book, it is revealed that her biological mother was a French woman). She constantly attracts men with her seductive dances, and is rarely seen without her clever goat Djali. She is around 16 years old and has a kind and generous heart.

== Character history ==
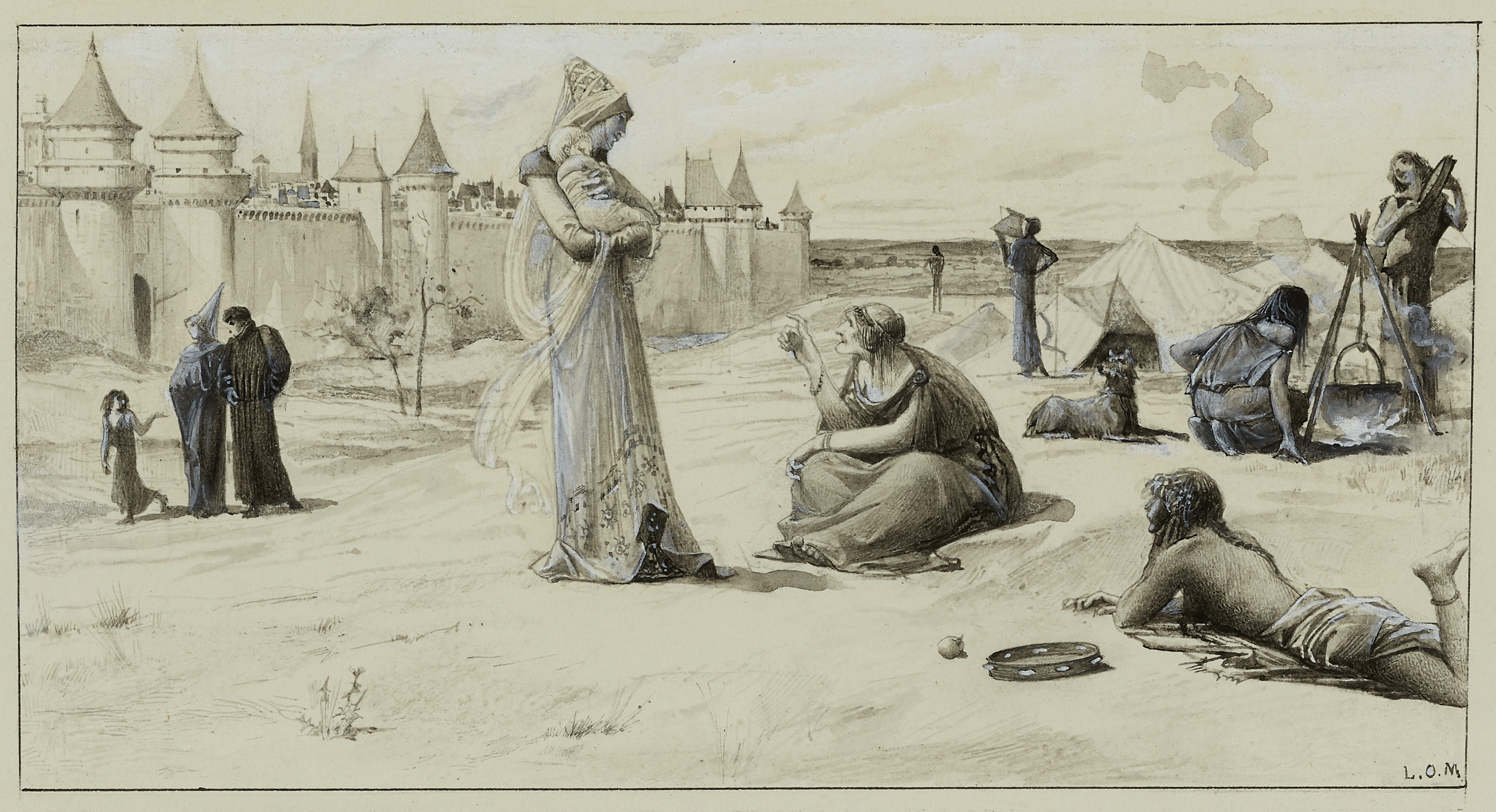
Holding her daughter Agnès in her arms, Paquette visits the Gypsies to have her fortune told. Drawing by Luc-Olivier Merson (c. 1889).

Esmeralda's birth-name was Agnès. She is the love child of Paquette Guybertaut, nicknamed "la Chantefleurie", an orphaned minstrel's daughter who lives in Rheims (now Reims). Paquette has become a prostitute after being seduced by a young nobleman, and lives a miserable life in poverty and loneliness. Agnes's birth makes Paquette happy once more, and she lavishes attention and care upon her adored child: even the neighbours begin to forgive Paquette for her past behaviour when they watch the pair. Tragedy strikes, however, when Romani (in the novel called Gypsies) kidnap the young baby, leaving a child which they consider hideously deformed (the infant Quasimodo) in place. The townsfolk come to the conclusion that the Gypsies have cannibalised baby Agnès; the mother flees Rheims in despair, and the deformed child is exorcised and sent to Paris, to be left on the foundling bed at Notre-Dame.

Fifteen years later, Agnès – now named La Esmeralda, in reference to the paste emerald she wears around her neck – is living happily amongst the Gypsies in Paris. She serves as a public dancer. Her pet goat Djali also performs counting tricks with a tambourine, an act later used as courtroom evidence that Esmeralda is a witch.

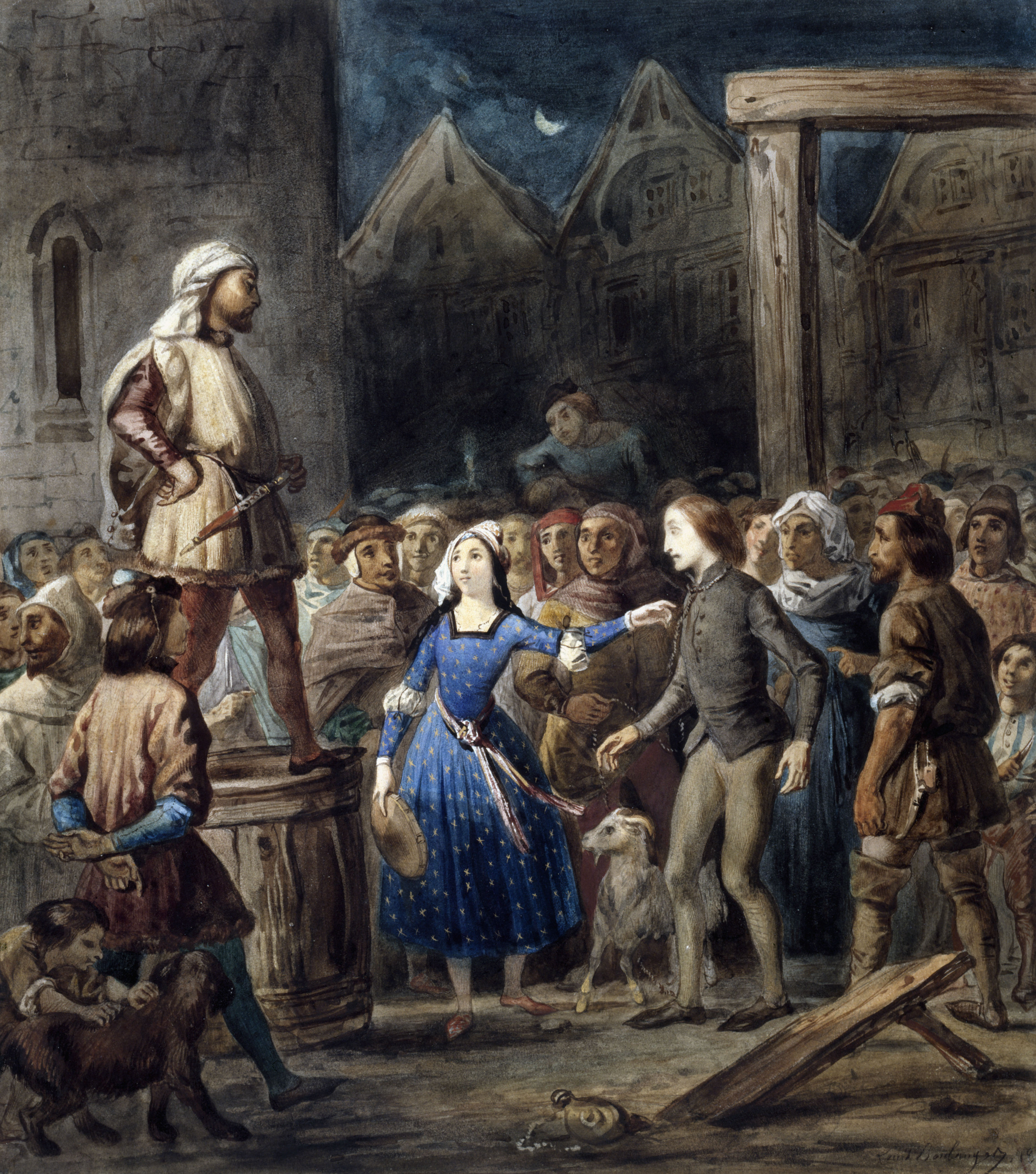
Esmeralda saves Pierre Gringoire's life by choosing him as her husband. Drawing by Louis Boulanger (c. 1831).

Claude Frollo sends his adopted son Quasimodo to kidnap Esmeralda from the streets. Esmeralda is rescued by Captain Phoebus, with whom she instantly falls in love to the point of obsession. Later that night, Clopin Trouillefou, the King of the Truands, prepares to execute a poet named Pierre Gringoire for trespassing the Truands' territory known as The Court of Miracles. In a compassionate act to save his life, Esmeralda agrees to marry Gringoire.

When Quasimodo is sentenced to the pillory for his attempted kidnapping, it is Esmeralda, his victim, who pities him and serves him water. Because of this, he falls deeply in love with her, even though she is too disgusted by his perceived ugliness even to let him kiss her hand. There, Paquette la Chantefleurie, now known as Sister Gudule, an anchoress, curses Esmeralda, claiming she and the other Gypsies ate her lost child.

Two months later, Esmeralda is walking in the streets when Fleur-de-Lys de Gondelaurier, the fiancée of Phoebus, and her wealthy, aristocratic friends spot the Gypsy girl from the Gondelaurier house. Fleur-de-Lys becomes jealous of Esmeralda's beauty and pretends to not see her, but Fleur's friends call Esmeralda to them out of curiosity. When Esmeralda enters the room, tension immediately appears – the wealthy young women, who all appear equally pretty when compared to each other, are plain in comparison to Esmeralda. Knowing that Esmeralda's beauty far surpasses their own, the aristocrats make fun of her clothes instead. Phoebus tries to make Esmeralda feel better, but Fleur grabs Esmeralda's bag and opens it. Pieces of wood with letters written on them fall out, and Djali moves the letters to spell out "Phoebus". Fleur, realizing that she now has competition, calls Esmeralda a witch and passes out. Esmeralda runs off, and Phoebus follows her.

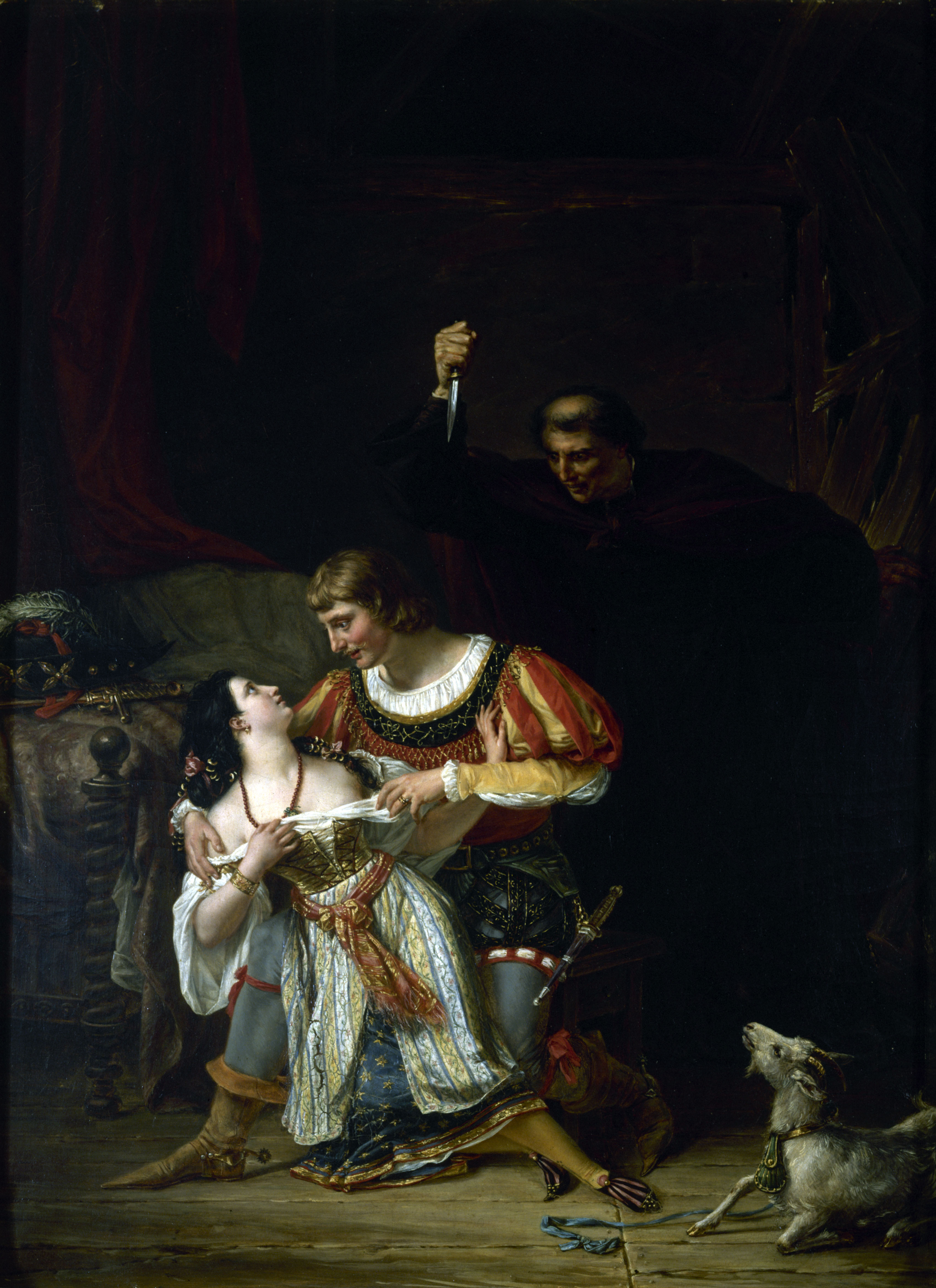
Claude Frollo stabs Captain Phoebus. Oil painting by Auguste Couder (1833).

Later that month, she meets with Phoebus and declares her love for him. Phoebus takes the opportunity to kiss her as she speaks, and he pretends to love her. He asks Esmeralda what the point of marriage is (he has no intentions of leaving his fiancée Fleur-de-Lys, he just wants to "sleep" with Esmeralda), which leaves the girl hurt. Phoebus, seeing the girl's reaction, pretends to be sad and says that Esmeralda must no longer love him. Esmeralda then says that she does love him and will do whatever he asks. Phoebus begins to undo Esmeralda's shirt and kisses her again. Frollo, who was watching from behind a door, bursts into the room in a jealous rage, stabs Phoebus, and flees. Esmeralda passes out at the sight of Frollo, and when she comes to, she finds herself framed for murder, for a miscommunication makes the jury believe that Phoebus is in fact dead. Esmeralda proclaims her innocence, but when she is threatened with having her foot crushed in a vice, she confesses. The court sentences her to death for murder and witchcraft (the court has seen Djali's spelling trick), and she is locked away in a cell. Frollo visits her, and Esmeralda hides in the corner (before this point in the book, the readers know that Frollo's lustful obsession of the girl has caused him to publicly denounce and stalk her). Frollo tells Esmeralda about his inner conflict about her, and he gives her an ultimatum: give herself to him or face death. Esmeralda, repulsed that Frollo would harm her to this extent for his own selfishness, refuses. Frollo, mad with emotion, leaves the city. The next day, minutes before she is to be hanged, Quasimodo dramatically arrives from Notre-Dame, takes Esmeralda, and runs back in while crying, "Sanctuary!".

While she stays in the cell at Notre-Dame, she slowly becomes friendly with Quasimodo and is able to look past his misshapen exterior. Quasimodo gives her a high-pitched whistle, one of the few things he can still hear, and instructs her to use it whenever she needs help. One day, Esmeralda spots Phoebus walking past the cathedral. She asks Quasimodo to follow the captain, but when Quasimodo finds where Phoebus is, he sees Phoebus leaving his fiancée's house. Quasimodo tells him that Esmeralda wants to see him: Phoebus, believing Esmeralda to be dead, believes Quasimodo to be a devil summoning him to Esmeralda in Hell, and flees in terror. Quasimodo returns and says he did not find Phoebus.

For weeks Esmeralda and Quasimodo live a quiet life, whilst Frollo hides in his private chambers thinking about what to do next. One night, he brings his master key to Esmeralda's room. The girl wakes up and is paralyzed with terror until Frollo pins her to the bed with his body and tries to rape her. Unable to fight him off, Esmeralda grabs the whistle and frantically blows it. Before Frollo can make sense of her actions, Quasimodo picks him up, slams him against the wall, and beats him with the intention of killing him. Before Quasimodo can finish, Frollo stumbles into the moonlight pouring in from a far window. Quasimodo sees who Esmeralda's attacker is, and drops him in surprise. Frollo fumes with fury, and tells Esmeralda that no one will have her if he cannot, before leaving the cathedral.

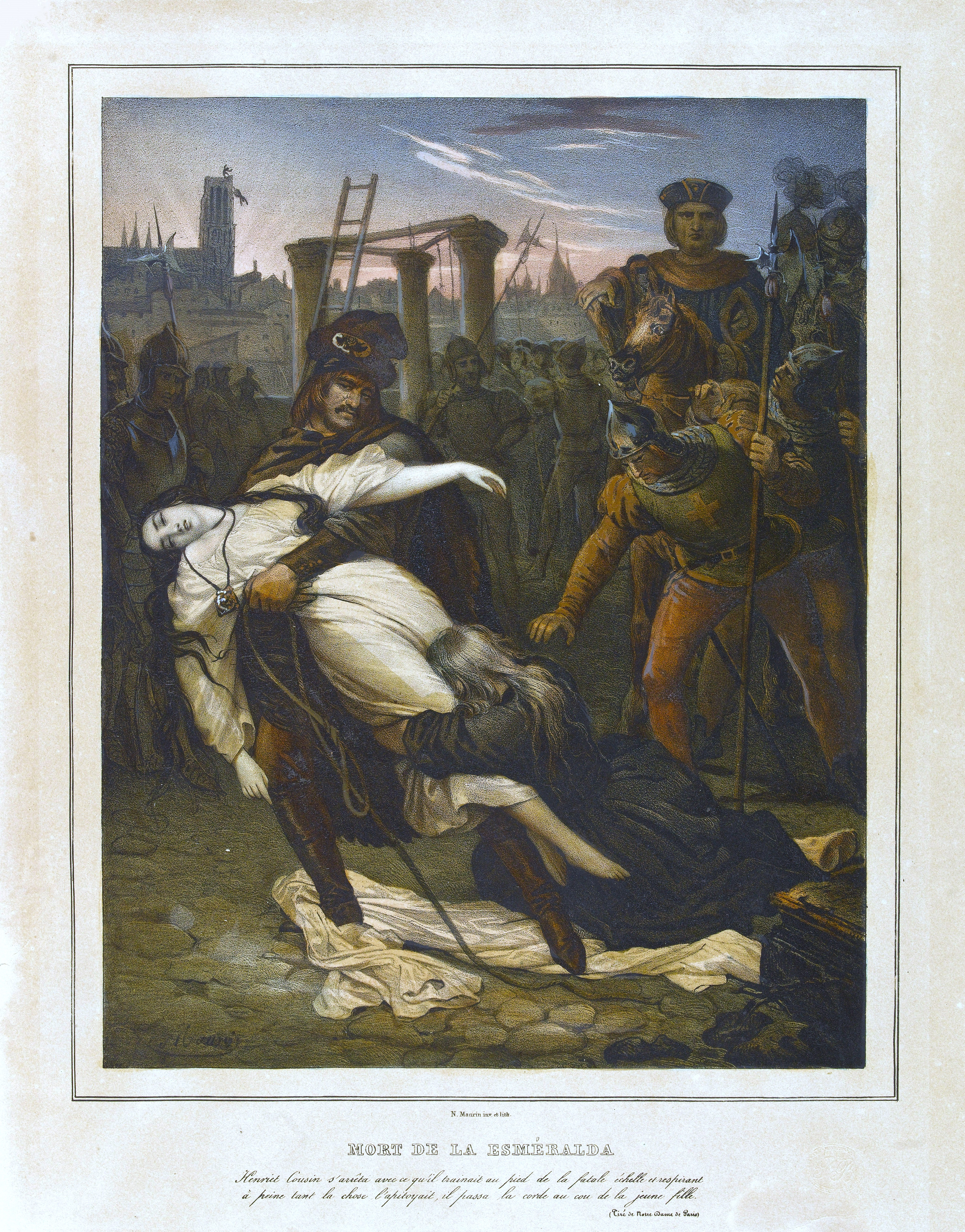
The Death of Esmeralda, by Nicolas Eustache Maurin (1834)

Frollo finds Gringoire and informs him that the Parliament has voted to remove Esmeralda from the sanctuary, and intends to order soldiers to forcibly accomplish the task. Gringoire reluctantly agrees to save the girl, and formulates a plan with Frollo. The next night, Gringoire leads all the Parisian Gypsies to Notre-Dame to rescue Esmeralda. Mistakenly responding to this, Quasimodo retaliates and uses Notre-Dame's defenses to fight the Gypsies, thinking that these people want to turn in Esmeralda. News of this soon comes to King Louis XI, and he sends soldiers (including Phoebus) to end the riot and hang Esmeralda. They reach Notre-Dame in time to save Quasimodo, who is outnumbered and unable to prevent the Gypsies from storming the Gallery of Kings. The Gypsies are slaughtered by the king's men, while Quasimodo (who has not realised that the soldiers wish to hang Esmeralda) runs to Esmeralda's room. He goes into a panic when she is nowhere to be found.

During the attack, Gringoire and a cloaked stranger slip into Notre-Dame and find Esmeralda about to sneak out of the cathedral (she had feared that soldiers were trying to take her away when she heard the battle). When Gringoire offers to save the girl, she agrees and goes with the two men. The three get into a nearby boat and paddle down the Seine, and she passes out when she hears many people chanting for her death.

When Esmeralda wakes, she finds that Gringoire is gone, and the stranger is Frollo. Frollo once more gives Esmeralda a choice: stay with him or be handed over to the soldiers. The girl asks to be executed. Angry, Frollo casts her into the arms of Gudule (Paquette Guybertaut). There, the two women realize that Esmeralda is in fact Gudule's lost child, Agnès. The guards arrive, and Gudule pleads for them to show Esmeralda and herself mercy. Gudule follows the guards to the scaffold, kicking and biting along the way. A guard throws Gudule to the ground; she hits her head and dies.

Back at Notre-Dame, Quasimodo is still frantically looking for his friend. He goes to the top of the north tower and finds Frollo there. Quasimodo notes Frollo's demented appearance and follows his gaze, where he sees Esmeralda in a white dress, dangling in her death throes from the scaffold. After Quasimodo pushes Frollo off the tower in a moment of rage, it is all but explicitly stated that he tracks Esmeralda's body to the mass graveyard where she was left after her execution and starves himself to death while embracing her corpse.

== Adaptations ==
Many film adaptations of The Hunchback of Notre-Dame have been made, which take various degrees of liberty with the novel and the character. The 1956 movie by Jean Delannoy, in which Esmeralda was portrayed by Gina Lollobrigida, introduced a number of significant changes to her character. Namely, in Delannoy's version Esmeralda is a Romani rather than a Frenchwoman adopted by the Romani, and her costume was designed to be as close as possible to that of a Medieval Romani woman. Lollobrigida was also the first actress to portray Esmeralda as routinely barefoot in contrast to Hugo's novel and some earlier adaptations thereof; (Note: For example, Maureen O'Hara was barefoot for some scenes of the 1939 adaptation but not others.) all these details made their way into a number of subsequent adaptations, including Disney's 1996 animated version.

In the 1996 Disney animated film adaptation, Esmeralda is shown to be a kind, caring, independent and witty Roma who is willing to help others in need. Esmeralda's greatest wish is to see outcasts like Quasimodo and her fellow Romani be accepted to society and be treated as people. She returns in the 2002 animated sequel, where she is married with Phoebus and they both have a son named Zephyr. Esmeralda is a very rare meetable character at the Disney Parks and Resorts, but can be seen as a figure inside Clopin's Music Box in Fantasyland. When the Disney Princess franchise was first formed in the early 2000s Esmeralda was also officially part of the original line-up, but she was soon removed as it was decided that she did not suit the brand. Nevertheless she is still marketed in some Disney Store products, albeit more moderately than other Disney heroines.

Usually each adaptation portrays Esmeralda as a young woman in her 20s, not a 16-year-old girl as in Hugo's novel. Among the actresses who have played her over the years are:

Actress	Version
Denise Becker	Esmeralda (1905 film)
Stacia Napierkowska	1911 film
Theda Bara	The Darling of Paris (1917 film)
Sybil Thorndike	Esmeralda (1922 film)
Patsy Ruth Miller	1923 film
Maureen O'Hara	1939 film
Gina Lollobrigida	1956 film
Gay Hamilton	1966 TV cartoon show
Michelle Newell	1977 TV film
Lesley-Anne Down	1982 TV film
Angela Punch McGregor (voice)	1986 animated film
Eleanor Noble (voice)	The Magical Adventures of Quasimodo (1996 cartoon TV show)
Demi Moore (voice); Heidi Mollenhauer (singing voice in the first film)	1996 Disney animated film and its 2002 sequel
Salma Hayek	1997 TV film
Hélène Ségara	Notre-Dame de Paris (1997–2002 musical)
Mélanie Thierry	Quasimodo d'El Paris (1999 parody film)
Tina Arena	Notre-Dame de Paris (2000 musical – Original London cast)
Candis Nergaard (voice)	2008 BBC Radio adaptation
Ciara Renée	2014–2015 musical

== See also ==
- List of barefooters
- Witchcraft accusations against children
