= The Hunchback of Notre Dame (1976 film) =

- VHS cover art
- Based on: The Hunchback of Notre-Dame by Victor Hugo
- Written by: Robert Muller
- Directed by: Alan Cooke
- Starring: Kenneth Haigh; Warren Clarke; Michelle Newell; Christopher Gable; David Rintoul; Richard Morant; Henrietta Baynes; Ruth Goring; Roger Hammond; John Ratcliff; William Garrity; Terence Bayler; Bruce Purchase; John Savident; Christopher Benjamin; Tony Caunter; Liz Smith; Janet Brandes; Diana Payan; Isobil Nisbet
- Country of origin: United Kingdom
- Original language: English

Production
- Producer: Cedric Messina
- Running time: 104 minutes

Original release
- Network: BBC
- Release: 30 December 1976

The Hunchback of Notre Dame is a British feature length adaptation of the 1831 novel by Victor Hugo, produced for television by the BBC (British Broadcasting Corporation) in 1976 and aired on December 30 the same year. Directed by Alan Cooke and written by Robert Muller, the film stars Kenneth Haigh as Claude Frollo, Warren Clarke as Quasimodo and Michelle Newell as Esmeralda, and features the visual effects by Ian Scoones and the original music by Wilfred Josephs.

== Plot summary ==
On January 6, 1482 — the day of the Feast of Fools in Paris, France, a play written by Pierre Gringoire is being performed at the Palace of Justice. The audience, however, is not very receptive, particularly Jehan, the brother of Notre Dame Cathedral's archdeacon, Claude Frollo. As a diversion, the people decide to elect a Pope of Fools. Quasimodo, the physically deformed bell ringer of Notre Dame, is chosen, despite Frollo's objections. Robin Poussepain calls the remaining attention to a Romany girl named La Esmeralda, who is dancing in the square.

As Gringoire follows Esmeralda, Frollo sends Quasimodo to kidnap her for him. Gringoire intervenes, only to be knocked down by the hunchback. Quasimodo is stopped and arrested by Phoebus de Chateaupers, the captain of King Louis XI's archers, who enchants Esmeralda, much to Frollo's silent jealousy. Still following Esmeralda, Gringoire is captured by beggars who take him to their king, Clopin Trouillefou, at the Court of Miracles. His life is offered to be spared if someone will marry him, and Esmeralda ends up doing so, though only out of pity.

The next day, in the courtroom of the Palace of Justice, Quasimodo is on trial for crimes of kidnapping and resisting arrest including assault on three of the royal guards. Being deaf, Quasimodo did not answer the questions of the equally-deaf auditor, Master Florain, prompting Jehan and Robin to discuss and mock the magistrate. They are also on trial for causing a riot with their fellow students, and when Provost Robert d'Estouteville, asks Quasimodo of his crimes, he instead gave them false answers, angering the provost as well. Jehan, encouraged by Robin, takes the opportunity to act as Quasimodo's lawyer, explaining to the provost how he, as the brother of the archdeacon, should be given the benefit of the doubt. Estouteville, before adjourning the court, orders Florian to sentence Quasimodo to be pilloried, flogged and left on public display in the pillory for one hour to make sure he will respect the law. Gringoire attempts to appeal to Florian, saying that Quasimodo's deafness renders the case unproven, but Quasimodo is instead sentenced to two hours of public torture.

Later that day, Quasimodo is being flogged, Frollo approaches the pillory, but leaves Quasimodo to suffer. Quasimodo, feeling unable to endure his two hours of torture in pillory during the hot weather, begs for water, but is mocked by the people, until Esmeralda gives him some from her canteen. This causes Quasimodo to fall in love with her.

A few months pass, and in Notre Dame Frollo is practicing alchemy when Jehan enter, begging for money. He explains to his older brother all about the "squalid melodrama" revolving around Esmeralda. He reveals how Captain Phoebus and Esmeralda will be together that night. Frollo confronts Phoebus, who allows the priest to watch him and Esmeralda have their way with one another. Unaware of Frollo's insane nature, Esmeralda attempts to convince Phoebus that she must remain chaste. While Phoebus is making his move, Frollo bursts out from his hiding place and stabs the captain, leaving Esmeralda alone to be arrested for a crime she didn't commit.

The very next day, at the Palace of Justice, Esmeralda stands before the court, accused of murdering Phoebus (with the additional charge of witchcraft) by the witnesses and Charmalou the prosecutor. Despite her persistent denying, Charmalou successfully forces Esmeralda to confess under torture, and she reluctantly agrees to accept her death sentence by hanging. At night, Frollo visits her while she is imprisoned and offers her safety in exchange for her becoming submissive to him. She rejects him, knowing the priest is the real attacker of Phoebus.

Esmeralda is prepared for execution outside Notre Dame. Gringoire, who previously attended Quasimodo and Esmeralda's trials, appeals to Frollo, pleading her innocence, but Frollo ignores these claims. Esmeralda sees Phoebus, now fully recovered from his injury, with Fleur de Lys and rejoices. Esmeralda tells Frollo that she should be free, seeing as how she is condemned for a crime never committed. Charmalou callously says that "People have come to see a hanging, not to debate the ethics of our judicial system," and orders the hangmen to bring Esmeralda to the scaffold. Quasimodo rushes from the cathedral doors, ascends the scaffold and throws one of two executioners into the crowd. He carries Esmeralda into the safety of the cathedral, shouting "Sanctuary," in the process.

Esmeralda later wakes up and finds herself inside Notre Dame. Quasimodo brings her food and finds Djali the goat for her, lamenting how he wishes he were only a beast like Djali. While Quasimodo explains to Esmeralda that he will jump off the building when she wants him to, Esmeralda spots Phoebus in the square and asks Quasimodo to bring him to her. Quasimodo, although heartbroken, follows her command and leaves to find Phoebus. Unfortunately, Phoebus is still repulsed by Quasimodo's hideous appearance, and he kicks the bell ringer to the ground. When he returns to Esmeralda and tells her of his failure, she is enraged, continuously striking the hunchback, crying her hatred of him. Despite this, Quasimodo merely thanks her and tearfully leaves to resume his job on ringing Notre Dame's bells. Frollo ascends to the tower and attempts to rape Esmeralda. Quasimodo stops him, but upon recognizing Frollo, he begs to be killed. Frollo instead spares Quasimodo, knowing that he is his adopted son. And as he leaves, he angrily promises that no one shall have Esmeralda.

That night, Frollo informs Gringoire that the parliament has voted to remove Esmeralda's right of sanctuary from Notre Dame and have her taken outside to be hanged. After being told of the same news by Gringoire, Clopin leads the beggars from the Court of Miracles to Notre Dame. Not realizing that they have come to rescue Esmeralda, Quasimodo throws timbers and stones, killing most of the vagabonds. It didn't take long before Captain Phoebus and the king's soldiers arrive to eliminate the whole gypsy crowd, along with Jehan and Robin, putting a stop to the rebellion. During the attack on the cathedral, Gringoire and Frollo, with the priest hiding his face in his cloak's hood, bring Esmeralda and Djali out of Notre Dame. Quasimodo, thinking Phoebus and his army have come to the rescue, returns to find Esmeralda gone, to his dismay.

When Esmeralda, Gringoire and Frollo reach the end of their destination on the Seine, Gringoire leaves Esmeralda with Frollo and takes Djali with him, pathetically apologizing for saving himself. Frollo reveals himself to Esmeralda, tells her that the cavaliers have blamed her for causing the rebellion and the ensuing carnage, and once more demands that she live with him safely as the man who loves her. Esmeralda refuses and tries to get away from the priest, but is trapped when Phoebus and his guards search for Esmeralda and meet Frollo, asking him if he had seen her. The priest points at Esmeralda, and Phoebus orders the soldiers to take her back to the scaffold, ignoring her screams for him as he leaves to have his wedding arranged.

In the morning, Charmalou tells Frollo about the death of so many people. Frollo express his guilt for Jehan, and Charmalou suggested that Quasimodo will be punished for his involvement in the rebellion, with Frollo adding that he, too, must die. The priest then walks up to the cathedral balcony to watch Esmeralda's hanging. After finishing ringing the bells, Quasimodo saw Esmeralda being transported back to the scaffold and brought up there. Gringoire returns to attend her execution, knowing that interfering with it could only worsen things for his own life even further. On the balcony of Notre Dame, Quasimodo finds Frollo and begs him to stop Esmeralda's execution. Frollo, refusing to interfere again, proclaims that Quasimodo is "beyond salvation" and strikes him down. Esmeralda is hanged, but not before Quasimodo gets up in time to see what is happening. As Frollo evilly smiles at the execution, the sight of his cruel nature and Esmeralda's death trigger the rage within Quasimodo, and the hunchback hurls his own master from Notre Dame to his death before silently crying over the loss of his only friend.

Gringoire finds Frollo's dead body on the stone steps of Notre Dame, before looking up to the sky and proclaiming that only he would be spared to tell the tale, and that there is a God in heaven. Phoebus, Fleur de Lys and the entire nobility dance in honor of their recent marriage.

== Cast ==
- Kenneth Haigh as Claude Frollo
- Warren Clarke as Quasimodo
- Michelle Newell as Esmeralda
- Christopher Gable as Pierre Gringoire
- David Rintoul as Jehan Frollo
- Richard Morant as Phoebus de Chateaupers
- Hetty Baynes as Fleur-de-Lys
- Ruth Goring as Madame de Gondelaurier
- Tony Caunter as Clopin Trouillefou
- Liz Smith as La Falourdel
- John Ratcliff as Robin
- Terence Bayler as Cardinal
