= The Hunchback of Notre Dame (1956 film) =

- French theatrical release poster
- Directed by: Jean Delannoy
- Written by: Victor Hugo (novel); Jean Aurenche; Jacques Prévert; Ben Hecht
- Based on: The Hunchback of Notre-Dame; 1831 novel by Victor Hugo
- Produced by: Raymond Hakim; Robert Hakim
- Starring: Gina Lollobrigida; Anthony Quinn; Jean Danet; Alain Cuny; Robert Hirsch
- Cinematography: Michel Kelber
- Edited by: Henri Taverna
- Music by: Georges Auric
- Production company: Paris Film Productions
- Distributed by: Cocinor
- Release date: December 19, 1956
- Running time: 115 minutes
- Countries: Italy; France
- Language: French
- Budget: $2 million
- Box office: $2.25 million (US and Canadian rentals)

The Hunchback of Notre Dame (in French Notre-Dame de Paris) is a 1956 CinemaScope drama horror film version of Victor Hugo's 1831 novel, directed by Jean Delannoy and produced by Raymond Hakim and Robert Hakim. It stars American actor Anthony Quinn and Italian actress Gina Lollobrigida. The film is the first version of the novel to be made in color.

In the tradition of many sword and sandal spectacles, Quinn and Lollobrigida are the only two actors in the film who actually speak in English; the rest of the cast is made up of French actors who have had their voices dubbed into English. In the French version both Quinn and Lollobrigida speak French.

Anthony Quinn's portrayal of the hunchback Quasimodo is less disfigured than most other portrayals. Instead of having a huge hump and a hideously deformed face, he only has a small curve in his spine and a slightly deformed face.

The film is one of the few adaptations to use Victor Hugo's original ending; although Esmeralda is killed by a stray arrow rather than hanged. Esmeralda's last words were: "Life is wonderful" ("C'est beau, la vie"). A voiceover narration tells us at the end that several years afterward, an excavation group finds the skeletons of Quasimodo and Esmeralda intertwined in an embrace.

== Plot ==
In Paris, Pierre Gringoire watches a crowd of hecklers ridicule his play. Clopin Trouillefou, the leader of the Roma, interrupts the play and disperses the crowd to attend the Feast of Fools, where Esmeralda performs an exotic dance. Claude Frollo becomes infatuated with her, and orders Quasimodo, his servant and the hunchbacked bellringer of the Notre-Dame Cathedral, to destroy their rituals. Shortly after, Quasimodo is crowned the King of the Fools and paraded throughout the streets. By nighttime, Frollo removes Quasimodo from the festivities. As they return home, Frollo orders Quasimodo to abduct Esmerelda. Quasimodo traps Esmeralda, but soldiers under the command of Captain Phoebus arrest him. He takes Esmeralda to an inn where he hopes to sleep with her, but she leaves.

Meanwhile, Gringoire is taken to the Court of Miracles and is sentenced to hang unless a woman is willing to marry him. Esmeralda arrives and agrees to marry him to spare his life. The next day, Quasimodo is flogged for the attempted kidnapping as Frollo practices alchemy to determine how to create gold. As Quasimodo begs the crowd for water, Esmeralda arrives and feeds him a vase of water. Quasimodo is later freed, and Frollo is angered when he learns Gringoire has married Esmeralda. As Frollo approaches her when she spells out Phoebus's name, he accuses Esmeralda of witchcraft.

Phoebus arrives at the residence of Fleur-de-Lys de Gondelaurier, his fiancée, but agrees to meet Esmeralda at the inn later that night. Frollo learns of their meeting and spies on them from below as Phoebus and Esmeralda embrace. Phoebus throws out Esmeralda's knife, and a jealous Frollo stabs Phoebus in the back (though Phoebus survives). Esmeralda is charged with attempted murder, and during her trial, the innkeeper and a dwarf accuse her of sorcery but claim they saw a dark-hooded figure outside. Esmeralda is escorted to the dungeon, and under torture, she confesses she stabbed Phoebus.

As Esmeralda is given her final sacraments before her execution, Quasimodo swings down, grabs and carries her into the cathedral balcony, where she is granted sanctuary. Esmeralda wakes up and is initially repulsed by Quasimodo, who has fallen in love with her. He hands her a whistle to use whenever she is in trouble. Frollo, now consumed with guilt, returns to the balcony where he learns Esmeralda is still alive. There, Esmeralda deduces that Frollo had stabbed Phoebus and alerts Quasimodo with the whistle. Quasimodo comes to her aid, and Frollo leaves.

The next day, Quasimodo and Esmeralda bond, but she is elevated when she sees Phoebus down below. She calls to him and sends Quasimodo to have Phoebus meet with her. Phoebus declines her request, so Quasimodo retrieves a bouquet and claims they were from Phoebus. However, Esmeralda does not believe him. Elsewhere, Frollo meets with King Louis XI, who consults with a prisoner on the Crown's authority to remove Esmeralda's right to sanctuary.

Clopin rallies the Roma people to storm Notre-Dame and rescue Esmeralda. Quasimodo mistakes the Roma for the king's soldiers and throws stones and pours molten wax down the cathedral's drainage system, burning several in the process. By dawn, Esmeralda runs down to the entrance, and the mob breaks through the door. Esmeralda is retrieved, but the king's soldiers shoot arrows at the Roma, killing Clopin and Esmeralda. Quasimodo grieves over Esmeralda's death, and when Frollo arrives, he angrily throws him off the balcony. Shortly after, Quasimodo finds Esmeralda's corpse and lies beside her to die.

== Cast ==
- Gina Lollobrigida as Esmeralda
- Anthony Quinn as Quasimodo
- Jean Danet as Phoebus de Chateaupers
- Alain Cuny as Claude Frollo
- Robert Hirsch as Pierre Gringoire
- Danielle Dumont as Fleur de Lys
- Philippe Clay as Clopin Trouillefou
- Maurice Sarfati as Jehan Frollo
- Jean Tissier as King Louis XI
- Valentine Tessier as Aloyse de Gondelaurier
- Jacques Hilling as Maitre Charmolue
- Jacques Dufilho as Guillaume Rousseau
- Roger Blin as Mathias Hungadi Spicali
- Marianne Oswald as La Falourdel
- Roland Bailly as The Hangman
- Piéral as The Dwarf
- Camille Guérini as The President
- Damia as The Beggar
- Robert Lombard as Jacques Coppenole
- Albert Rémy as Jupiter
- Hubert de Lapparent as Guillaume de Harancourt
- Boris Vian as Cardinal Charles of Bourbon
- Georges Douking as A Thief
- Paul Bonifas as Master Lecornu
- Madeleine Barbulée as Madame Outarde
- Albert Michel as Night Watchman
- Daniel Emilfork as Andry le Rouge

== Production ==
Allied Artists invested $1,250,000 in the film.

== Reception ==
=== Box office ===
The film was the biggest grosser in Paris in the 1956–1957 season with a gross of $603,000 on admissions of 1,064,061. It had the third most admissions in France for films released in 1956 with 5,687,222 admissions.

The film earned rentals of $2.25 million in the United States and Canada.

== Comic book adaptation ==
- Dell Four Color #854 (July 1957)
