= Frollo =

Frollo, as a surname, may refer to the following:

- Claude Frollo, the Archdeacon of Notre Dame Cathedral in Victor Hugo's 1831 novel The Hunchback of Notre-Dame
  - Jehan Frollo, Claude Frollo's brother
- Leone Frollo, an Italian comic book and erotic artist
