= The Hunchback of Notre Dame (1982 film) =

- Video cover
- Genre: Gothic romance
- Based on: The Hunchback of Notre-Dame by Victor Hugo
- Written by: John Gay
- Directed by: Michael Tuchner; Alan Hume
- Starring: Anthony Hopkins; Derek Jacobi; Lesley-Anne Down; John Gielgud
- Theme music composer: Ken Thorne
- Country of origin: United States
- Original language: English

Production
- Producers: Norman Rosemont; Malcolm J. Christopher
- Cinematography: Alan Hume
- Editor: Keith Palmer
- Running time: 100 minutes
- Production companies: Rosemont Productions; Columbia Pictures Television

Original release
- Network: CBS
- Release: February 4, 1982

The Hunchback of Notre Dame (sometimes known as simply Hunchback) is a 1982 American Gothic romance TV film based on Victor Hugo's 1831 novel. Filming location was Pinewood Studios, England. It was directed by Michael Tuchner and Alan Hume and produced by Norman Rosemont and Malcolm J. Christopher. It starred Anthony Hopkins, Derek Jacobi, Lesley-Anne Down and John Gielgud. The film was produced as part of the long-running Hallmark Hall of Fame series and was televised on CBS on February 4, 1982.

== Plot ==
In 15th century Paris, France, during the reign of Louis XI, the deformed and hunchbacked bell ringer of Notre Dame Cathedral, Quasimodo, falls in love with the beautiful gypsy dancer Esmeralda, who is in love with Captain Phoebus. When Quasimodo's master and adoptive father, Archdeacon Dom Claude Frollo, also becomes obsessed with Esmeralda, he tries to force her under his spell. However, when she rejects him, he indicts her for "attempted murder and witchcraft" and sentences her to death by hanging in the town square of Paris. On the day of her execution, Quasimodo rescues her and grants her "Sanctuary" in Notre Dame. The two eventually grow closer, but Quasimodo realizes that his love for Esmeralda will probably never be reciprocated, due to her physical appearance. Pierre Gringoire and Clopin Trouillefoul, the leader of the Roma, assemble the Court of Miracles in a plan to rescue Esmeralda. Quasimodo interprets the attack on Notre Dame as an attempt to harm Esmeralda, and counterattacks the gypsy invaders with wooden beams, blocks of stone, and molten lead. Frollo takes advantage of Quasimodo's distraction and searches for Esmeralda throughout the cathedral, finding her hiding in the bell tower. Esmeralda rings the bell to call for help, and Quasimodo goes to find her. He finds Frollo trying to take Esmeralda with him by force. He tries to block Frollo's path, but Frollo kicks him, so Quasimodo knocks him down and the two fight intensely, with Frollo attempting to stab Quasimodo, who ends up impaling him on a hook. After the unsuccessful attack, Gringoire enters the cathedral tower and finds Esmeralda and Quasimodo, and the couple embrace. Quasimodo sees the king's officers approaching and helps Gringoire and Esmeralda, leading them to a secret tunnel that will take them outside. Esmeralda thanks him and kisses Quasimodo goodbye and escapes with Gringoire. The soldiers chase Quasimodo, who escapes to the bell tower, leaving the cathedral, with the soldiers in pursuit. He escapes along the edges, holding on to the gargoyles, but ends up slipping, hanging from a gargoyle. He looks around and asks "Why?" and falls to his death.

== Cast ==
- Lesley-Anne Down as Esmeralda
- Anthony Hopkins as Quasimodo
- Derek Jacobi as Claude Frollo
- David Suchet as Clopin Trouillefou
- Gerry Sundquist as Pierre Gringoire
- Tim Pigott-Smith as Phillipe
- John Gielgud as Jacques Charmolue
- Robert Powell as Captain Phoebus
- Nigel Hawthorne as Magistrate at Esmeralda's trial
- Roland Culver as Bishop of Paris
- Rosalie Crutchley as Simone
- David Kelly as Tavernkeeper
- Joseph Blatchley as Albert
- Dave Hill as Coppenhole
- Donald Eccles as Judge
- Timothy Bateson as Commerce
- Jack Klaff as Officer
- Timothy Morand as Maurice
- Eunice Black as Clergy
- Kenny Baker as Pickpocket
- Stanley Lebor as Torturer
- Norman Lumsden as King's Attorney
