= Quasimodo d'El Paris =

- Theatrical release poster
- Directed by: Patrick Timsit
- Written by: Jean-François Halin; Raffy Shart; Patrick Timsit
- Produced by: René Cleitman; António da Cunha Telles
- Starring: Patrick Timsit; Richard Berry; Mélanie Thierry
- Cinematography: Vincenzo Marano
- Edited by: Catherine Renault
- Music by: Laurent Petitgirard
- Distributed by: BAC Films
- Release date: 1999
- Running time: 100 minutes
- Country: France
- Language: French
- Budget: $11 million
- Box office: $12.8 million

Quasimodo d'El Paris is a 1999 French film that is a comedic adaptation of the 1831 novel The Hunchback of Notre-Dame (Notre-Dame de Paris) by Victor Hugo.

== Plot ==
The location is the town of El Paris. When ten-year-old boy Quasimodo shows signs of deformity, his well-to-do parents place him in the charge of the town’s mysterious evangelist, Frollo. In exchange, they adopt a Cuban girl, Esméralda, from a lower social class. Ten years later, El Paris is menaced by a serial killer, and Quasimodo is the prime suspect.

== Cast ==
- Patrick Timsit as Quasimodo
- Richard Berry as Serge Frollo
- Mélanie Thierry as Agnès / Esméralda
- Vincent Elbaz as Phoebus
- Didier Flamand as The Governor
- Patrick Braoudé as Pierre-Grégoire
- Axelle Abbadie as The Governor's wife
- Dominique Pinon as Trouillefou
- Albert Dray as Pablo
- Doud as Diego
- François Levantal as The psychopath
- Lolo Ferrari as the fairy
- Jean-François Halin as the car driver
- Raffy Shart as the man with a hat
- Cathy Guetta as the prostitute

== See also ==
- List of French films of 1999
