= The Hunchback of Notre Dame (1966 TV series) =

1966 British television series

- Based on: The Hunchback of Notre-Dame by Victor Hugo
- Screenplay by: Vincent Tilsley
- Directed by: James Cellan Jones
- Starring: Peter Woodthorpe; Gay Hamilton
- Country of origin: United Kingdom
- Original language: English

Original release
- Release: 8 March 1966

The Hunchback of Notre Dame is a 1966 British television series, an adaptation of the 1831 novel by Victor Hugo, directed by James Cellan Jones. It starred Peter Woodthorpe as Quasimodo and Gay Hamilton as Esmeralda. The screenplay was by Vincent Tilsley. Although some photographs exist, no recordings of the production are known to have survived.

== Cast ==
- Peter Woodthorpe as Quasimodo
- Gay Hamilton as Esmeralda
- James Maxwell as Claude Frollo
- Wilfrid Lawson as King of the Beggars
- Gary Raymond as Pierre Gringoire
- Alexander Davion as Captain Phoebus
- Emrys Jones as Charmolue
- Suzanne Neve as Fleur de Lys
- Derek Baker as Torturer
- Beatrix Lehmann as Gudule
- Jeffrey Isaac as Beggar
- Ray Mitchell as Cathedral chorister

== Episode titles ==
- Episode 1 "Abduction" 8 March 1966
- Episode 2 "Torture" 15 March 1966
- Episode 3 "Seduction" 22 March 1966
- Episode 4 "Interrogation" 29 March 1966
- Episode 5 "Accusation" 5 April 1966
- Episode 6 "Repentance" 12 April 1966
- Episode 7 "Retribution" 19 April 1966
