= Claude Frollo =

Character of The Hunchback of Notre-Dame

Monseigneur Claude Frollo
- The Hunchback of Notre-Dame character
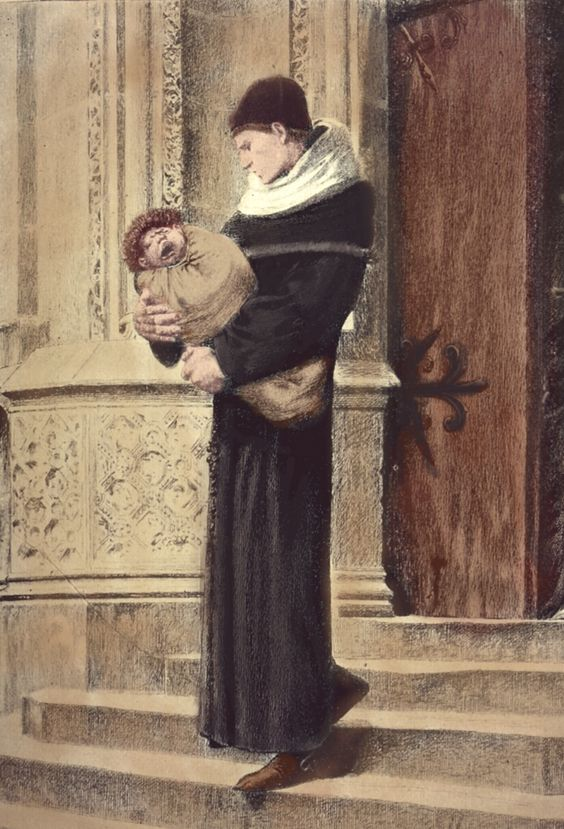
- Claude Frollo holding infant Quasimodo on the steps of Notre Dame in 1467. Illustration by Luc-Olivier Merson, 1889.
- First appearance: The Hunchback of Notre-Dame; March 16, 1831
- Created by: Victor Hugo

In-universe information
- Title(s): Dom; Archdeacon; Monseigneur
- Occupation: Archdeacon of Notre Dame cathedral
- Affiliation: Members of the church
- Family: Jehan Frollo (younger brother)
- Children: Quasimodo (adopted son)
- Religion: Catholic
- Nationality: French

Claude Frollo (French: [klod fʁɔlo]) is a fictional Catholic clergyman and the main antagonist of Victor Hugo's 1831 novel The Hunchback of Notre-Dame (original French title: Notre-Dame de Paris). He is also an alchemist, Renaissance humanist, and intellectual. In his decision to choose a Roman Catholic priest as the primary villain of his novel, Hugo was very much under the influence of the anti-religious currents of the Enlightenment.

== In the novel ==
Dom Claude Frollo is a pious, highly intelligent French nobleman who was orphaned along with his younger brother Jehan when their parents died of the plague. His studies led him to become the Archdeacon of Josas, which is his position during the events of the novel. He also has inherited a small fief that provides him with a minor source of income which is used to fund his brother Jehan's law studies, but the latter has instead joined "the Scoundrels", an early form of literary bohemia, and Jehan spends most of his time and Frollo's money on alcoholism and wenching.

During the religious holiday in Eastertide called Quasimodo Sunday, Frollo adopts a deformed hunchback infant whom he finds abandoned on the cathedral's foundlings bed. He adopts the boy, names him "Quasimodo" after the holiday, raises him with the love he wishes he could have given to Jehan, and teaches him a sort of sign language when Quasimodo is deafened by the cathedral's bells. At the dawn of the Renaissance in France, Frollo is a respected Renaissance humanist and studies several languages, law, medicine, natural science, and theology. He has also become infatuated with alchemy, however, which leads the people of Paris to believe that he is a warlock. All this, along with his extreme and irrational fear of women, contribute further to his isolation from society.

His fear of women is because Frollo, who is expected to live as a compassionate and celibate Roman Catholic priest, secretly fears his strong capacity for both extreme sadism and sexual deviancy. After a lifetime of concealment and suppression, Frollo's latent narcissism finally erupt when he first sees dancing the 16-year-old Roma (Gypsy) girl Esmeralda, who eventually proves to be his undoing. He first considers her to be a temptation sent by the Devil to corrupt him and, instead of taking personal responsibility, he instead blames Esmeralda and loathes her as a demon. He ultimately decides, in the throes of a midlife crisis, that he is predestined to gratify his mounting lust, only to learn that Esmeralda is still a virgin, that she wishes to become a Catholic, and is accordingly repulsed by Frollo's desperate longing to violate his priestly celibacy. Deciding in a rage to rape her, Frollo and Quasimodo kidnap her, but they are caught red-handed by Captain Phoebus de Chateaupers and his guards. Frollo escapes and ignores Quasimodo when he sees him being publicly humiliated for their crime on the pillory. When Frollo discovers Esmeralda is romantically interested in Phoebus, he spies on their next meeting. Esmeralda has arranged this meeting expecting to marry her rescuer—unaware that Phoebus is already engaged, but intends to tell Esmeralda whatever she wants to hear to get a one-night stand. Just before Esmeralda is able to give her virginity to a shallow, vacuous man who does not love or respect her, Frollo, in a jealous rage, stabs Phoebus, kisses Esmeralda when she faints, and flees the scene of the crime.

Frollo makes no attempt to prove her innocence when Esmeralda is turned over to the magistrate on false charges of witchcraft and attempted murder, but stabs himself during her interrogation under torture and shows her the wound as a proof of his love for her. She is unmoved, however, and remains in denial about the real character of Phoebus. Despite his expressed desire to leave the priesthood for her, Esmeralda refuses to escape to the countryside and cohabitate with Frollo, while posing as husband and wife. Shortly before she is to be executed, Frollo leaves Paris, almost in a state of madness, without realizing that Quasimodo—who is also in love with her—has decided to rescue Esmeralda from the gallows. When he returns to the news that Esmeralda is still alive, he becomes as envious of Quasimodo as he was of Phoebus. Frollo attempts to rape her at her sanctuary in the cathedral, but Quasimodo—who doesn't realize who Esmeralda's attacker is at first—comes to the girl's defense. Enraged and humiliated, Frollo vows that no man will have Esmeralda if he cannot and leaves.

Frollo's next opportunity to abduct and force Esmeralda comes soon after. A group of the scoundrels led by Clopin Trouillefou and whose ranks include Jehan Frollo, who are enraged by news that the French King Louis XI has ordered his soldiers to violate Canon law regarding the right of sanctuary and remove Esmeralda from the cathedral to be hanged and that the Archbishop of Paris has agreed to allow it, arm themselves. Announcing that if Esmeralda's sanctuary is not safe then neither is the Archbishop's Cathedral, Clopin issues orders to desecrate Notre Dame in retaliation and rescue her. While an oblivious Quasimodo kills Clopin, Jehan, and fights off the scoundrels, the playwright Pierre Gringoire, Esmeralda's legal husband—whom she only married to save his life—and a hooded figure sneak into the cathedral and convince Esmeralda to sneak out with them. The man's face is hidden behind a hood, leaving Esmeralda to guess his identity. They flee to a boat on the River Seine, then separate when they head to shore, with Gringoire taking Esmeralda's goat, Djali, and leaving her with the unknown man. The hooded figure drags Esmeralda to a nearby gallows and identifies himself as Frollo by removing his hood.

Frollo issues Esmeralda a final ultimatum: either she gratify his lustful desires or he will hand her over and watch her be hanged. Saying she fears death on the gallows less than Frollo, Esmeralda again rejects him, so he leaves her to an anchoress to hold her for the royal soldiers coming to hang her and goes back to Notre Dame Cathedral. He then walks up to one of the cathedral's towers to watch Esmeralda being hanged, unaware that Quasimodo has followed him. He watches calmly while Esmeralda is taken to the gallows.

When Quasimodo watches him laughing sadistically over Esmeralda's hanging, he becomes enraged and pushes Frollo off the balustrade. A gargoyle stops his fall, and Frollo pleads with his adopted son for help, but Quasimodo instead glares at Frollo and remains silent. In a deliberately symbolic metaphor for his renunciation of Christian morality and of the Catholic Faith, Frollo loses his grip, falls from the cathedral, hits the pavement, and is killed instantly.

== Adaptations ==
Hugo's novel has been adapted to film on numerous occasions. Due to policies of the NAMPI Thirteen Points, the filmmakers of the 1923 film adaptation would not portray a member of the Catholic Church in a negative and controversial light. As a result, Claude Frollo (played by Nigel de Brulier) is not the villain, but instead a good-hearted archdeacon of Notre Dame, and the villain of the film is actually his younger brother Jehan (played by Brandon Hurst). The 1939 film had a similar change for the same reason due to policies of the Hays Production Code; the only difference is that Jehan (played by Sir Cedric Hardwicke) is portrayed as King Louis XI's Chief Justice of Paris, and Claude (played by Walter Hampden) is portrayed as the Archbishop of Paris. In Disney's 1996 animated film, Claude Frollo (voiced by Tony Jay) is Paris' judge/Minister of Justice and the villain as in the novel, the Archdeacon of Notre Dame is a separate character entirely (and voiced by David Ogden Stiers), and the character of Jehan is omitted.

Among the actors who played Claude Frollo over the years in each adaptation of the novel are:

Actor	Version
Claude Garry	1911 film
Walter Law	The Darling of Paris (1917 film)
Annesley Healy	Esmeralda (1922 film)
Nigel DeBrulier	1923 film
Walter Hampden	1939 film
Alain Cuny	1956 film
James Maxwell	1966 cartoon TV show
Kenneth Haigh	1977 TV show
Derek Jacobi	1982 TV film
Ron Haddrick (voice)	1986 animated film
Vlasta Vrána (voice)	The Magical Adventures of Quasimodo (1996 cartoon TV show)
Tony Jay (voice)	1996 Disney animated film
Richard Harris	1997 TV film
Daniel Lavoie	Notre Dame de Paris (1997-2002 musical)
Richard Berry (as Serge Frollo)	Quasimodo d'El Paris (1999 parody film)
Kevin Doyle (voice)	2008 BBC Radio adaptation
Patrick Page	2014-2015 musical

Jehan actually did appear as he was originally portrayed in the novel in the following adaptations:

- The 1956 film (in which he was played by Maurice Sarfati).
- The 1977 film (in which he was played by David Rintoul).
- The 2014-2015 musical (in which he was played by Lucas Coleman / Jeremy Stolle).

== See also ==
- Esmeralda (The Hunchback of Notre Dame)
- Quasimodo
