= The Hunchback of Notre Dame II =

- DVD cover
- Directed by: Bradley Raymond
- Screenplay by: Flip Kobler; Cindy Marcus; Jule Selbo
- Based on: The Hunchback of Notre Dame by Victor Hugo
- Produced by: Chris Henderson; Hiroshi Saotome; Stephen Swofford
- Starring: Tom Hulce; Jennifer Love Hewitt; Michael McKean; Haley Joel Osment; Demi Moore; Kevin Kline
- Edited by: Colleen Halsey; Peter Lonsdale
- Music by: Carl Johnson
- Production company: Walt Disney Television Animation
- Distributed by: Walt Disney Home Entertainment (Note: Released through the Walt Disney Pictures banner.)
- Release date: March 19, 2002
- Running time: 68 minutes
- Countries: United States; Japan
- Language: English

The Hunchback of Notre Dame II is a 2002 American animated medieval period musical romantic comedy film directed by Bradley Raymond. It is a direct-to-video sequel to Disney's 1996 animated feature film The Hunchback of Notre Dame. The film was produced by the Japanese office of Walt Disney Animation and Walt Disney Television Animation, while it was released by Walt Disney Home Entertainment on March 19, 2002. Many of the actors from the original film reprise their roles, with the addition of new characters played by Jennifer Love Hewitt, Michael McKean and Haley Joel Osment. In this movie, Quasimodo falls in love with a circus girl named Madellaine, but goes into action when a magician named Sarousch seeks to steal one of the bells of Notre Dame. Critical reception was mostly negative.

== Plot ==
Some years after becoming an accepted member of Parisian society, (Note: As depicted in The Hunchback of Notre Dame (1996).) Quasimodo still resides in Notre-Dame de Paris as its bell ringer alongside his gargoyle companions: Victor, Hugo, and Laverne. Captain Phoebus and Esmeralda are now married and have a son named Zephyr, who has formed a close friendship with Quasimodo.

A circus troupe called Cirque de Sarousch comes as part of the Le Jour d'Amour, a romantic celebration in which couples declare their love for one another. Unbeknownst to anyone, the members of the circus troupe are thieves who steal from their audiences during their performances. The circus troupe’s owner, Sarousch, plans to steal Notre Dame's most beloved bell, La Fidèle, as the interior is decorated with beige-gold and enormous jewels. He sends his assistant, an aspiring high-wire performer named Madellaine, to manipulate Quasimodo in order to discover the whereabouts of La Fidèle. Entering Notre-Dame De Paris, Madellaine meets Quasimodo, who is hiding behind a bell. They get along quite well, but when he finally reveals himself to her, she runs away in shock. Victor, Hugo, and Laverne convince him to go to the circus in order to see her again. At the circus, Sarousch captures the audience's attention by making an elephant disappear while his subordinates steal from the audience. After the magic show, Madellaine tells him that she does not want to be part of his scheme anymore, but he reminds her of her past: when she was six years old, she was an orphan who he caught trying to steal money from him. He could have reported her to the authorities but decided to employ her in exchange for food and somewhere to live instead. When she sees Quasimodo playing with Zephyr, she ceases to be scared of his appearance. He takes her sightseeing around Paris, but a thunderstorm forces them to go inside Notre Dame. He takes the opportunity to give her a figurine of her that he created. She kisses him on the forehead and leaves. This causes him to faint out of happiness.

The next day, he goes to Esmeralda for advice because he feels weird. She realizes that he is in love with Madellaine and tells him that he needs to confess his feelings. When Phoebus reveals that he has discovered a connection between reports of robberies in the city and the circus, this makes Quasimodo, Esmerelda, and Zephyr angry with him because Quasimodo does not think that Madellaine is involved, Esmerelda thinks that he carries prejudice, and Zephyr likes the circus. Sarousch threatens Madellaine that he will kill Quasimodo unless she keeps him occupied while he and his men steal La Fidèle. Phoebus questions him about the robberies and finds a stolen jewel. Realizing that he can use this to his advantage, he lies that Madellaine is a lifelong thief and he is covering for her crimes. While Quasimodo and Madellaine take a walk, Sarousch and two of his subordinates sneak into Notre Dame. Victor, Hugo, and Laverne try to stop the thieves, but they get trapped under another bell. Zephyr and Djali watch Sarousch make La Fidèle vanish, then decide to learn where he is taking it. Laverne sounds the alarm by banging her head against the bell in order to alert everyone outside.

After the new Archdeacon reveals that La Fidèle has been stolen, Phoebus realizes that Sarousch tricked him and sends his soldiers around Paris. Quasimodo accuses Madellaine of never loving him and breaks off their relationship while Phoebus has her arrested. He frees Victor, Hugo, and Laverne, who tell him that Zephyr is pursuing Sarousch. While the thieves take La Fidèle through the Catacombs of Paris, they discover Zephyr and Djali who have stowed away on their boat. Djali manages to escape from them and goes through a tunnel. When Madellaine reveals that Sarousch has taken La Fidèle underground, Phoebus decides to search the catacombs and reluctantly brings Madellaine. In the Catacombs, the search party encounters Djali who leads them to the thieves and Zephyr. Sarousch has taken Zephyr hostage and blackmails Phoebus into opening a gate for him. After Madellaine pleads with Quasimodo to trust her, he lassos a rock in order to create a tightrope that she walks across. She uses her high-wire skills in order to rescue Zephyr and reunite him with his parents. Sarousch and his men are given a life sentence in prison for his crimes.

During Le Jour d'Amour, a number of romantic couples including Phoebus and Esmeralda declare their love while Quasimodo rings La Fidèle. He and Madellaine declare their own love and share their first kiss while Zephyr rings La Fidèle.

== Voice cast ==
- Tom Hulce as Quasimodo, the bell ringer of Notre Dame.
- Jennifer Love Hewitt as Madellaine, a circus troupe member who Quasimodo falls for.
- Haley Joel Osment as Zephyr, the son of Esmeralda and Phoebus, who has Quasimodo as his best friend.
- Michael McKean as Sarousch, the leader of the circus troupe.
- Demi Moore as Esmeralda, a Romani woman, friend of Quasimodo, Phoebus' wife, and Zephyr's mother.
- Kevin Kline as Captain Phoebus, captain of the guard of Paris, friend of Quasimodo, Esmeralda's husband, and Zephyr's father.
- Charles Kimbrough as Victor, a gargoyle.
- Jason Alexander as Hugo, a gargoyle.
- Jane Withers as Laverne, a gargoyle. This was Withers' last film before her death.
- Frank Welker as Achilles, Phoebus' horse. He was previously voiced by Bob Bergen in the first film.
  - Welker also voices Djali, Esmeralda's goat, replacing the late Mary Kay Bergman.
- Paul Kandel as Clopin, the leader of the gypsies.
- April Winchell as Lady DeBurne
- Joe Lala as Guard #1
- Jim Cummings as the Archdeacon.

== Home media ==
As announced on August 21, 2000, the film was originally going to be released on DVD and VHS on August 28, 2001. However, the release date was delayed to March 19, 2002, to coincide with the VHS/DVD re-release of the original film.

== Reception ==
The review aggregator website Rotten Tomatoes reported that 22% of critics have given the film a positive review based on 9 reviews, with an average rating of 4/10.

DVDactive said it was an "unusually chintzy production", noting "the characters are slightly off-model, their movements are stilted, optical zooms are used in place of animated camera moves, animation cycles are over-used, and painted highlights float around between frames". It compared it to the company's television shows, adding it looks "cheap", "old", and "awful". It concluded by saying "it is mercifully short – under an hour without credits." Hi-Def Digest said "There's really no point in wasting your time watching this subpar sequel of an already ho-hum movie", rating it 1.5 stars. PopMatters notes "The Hunchback of Notre Dame II both addresses and cheapens the previous movie's notes of melancholy, as it sets about finding Quasimodo a romantic partner". DVD Talk says "the story...somehow stretches what might have once been a 12-minute segment of the Smurfs to over an hour", and concludes that "the whole thing has the awful feel of a cash grab".

== Songs ==
This was the final film credit for Angela Morley who orchestrated Carl Johnson's score.

No.	Title	Writer(s)	Performer(s)	Length
1.	"Le Jour D'Amour"	Randy Petersen & Kevin Quinn	Paul Kandel, Tom Hulce, Charles Kimbrough, Jason Alexander, Jane Withers & Chorus
2.	"An Ordinary Miracle"	Walter Edgar Kennon	Tom Hulce
3.	"I'd Stick with You"	Walter Edgar Kennon	Haley Joel Osment & Tom Hulce
4.	"Fa la la la Fallen In Love"	Walter Edgar Kennon	Charles Kimbrough, Jason Alexander, Jane Withers & Chorus
5.	"I'm Gonna Love You (Madellaine's Love Song)"	Jennifer Love Hewitt & Chris Canute	Jennifer Love Hewitt
