= The Hunchback of Notre Dame (1923 film) =

1923 film by Wallace Worsley

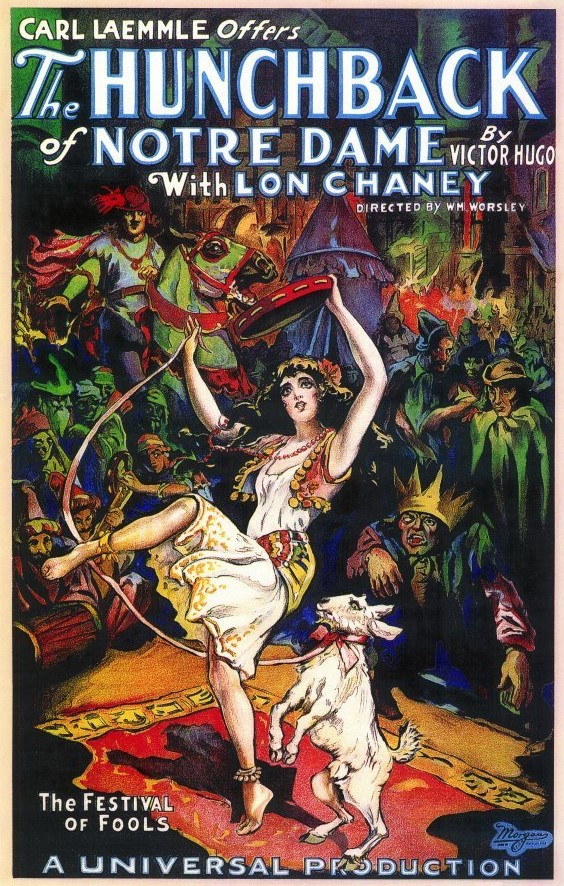
- Theatrical release poster
- Directed by: Wallace Worsley
- Screenplay by: Edward T. Lowe, Jr.; Perley Poore Sheehan
- Based on: The Hunchback of Notre Dame; 1831 novel by Victor Hugo
- Produced by: Carl Laemmle; Uncredited: Lon Chaney; Irving Thalberg
- Starring: Lon Chaney; Patsy Ruth Miller; Norman Kerry; Brandon Hurst; Raymond Hatton; Ernest Torrence; Nigel de Brulier
- Cinematography: Robert Newhard; Uncredited Effects Assistants: Tony Kornman; Virgil Miller; Stephen S. Norton; Charles J. Stumar
- Edited by: Edward Curtiss; Maurice Pivar; Sydney Singerman
- Music by: Cecil Copping; Carl Edouarde; Hugo Riesenfeld; Heinz Eric Roemheld
- Production company: Universal Pictures
- Distributed by: Universal Pictures
- Release dates: September 2, 1923 (Astor Theatre); September 6, 1923 (USA)
- Running time: 102 minutes; 117 minutes (Director's cut); 98 minutes (cut edition)
- Country: United States
- Language: Silent (English intertitles)
- Budget: $1,250,000 (estimated)
- Box office: $3.5 million (worldwide rentals)

The Hunchback of Notre Dame is a 1923 American drama film starring Lon Chaney, directed by Wallace Worsley, and produced by Carl Laemmle and Irving Thalberg. The supporting cast includes Patsy Ruth Miller, Norman Kerry, Nigel de Brulier and Brandon Hurst. Distributed by Universal Pictures, the film was the studio's "Super Jewel" of 1923 and was their most successful silent film, grossing $3.5 million. The film premiered on September 2, 1923, at the Astor Theatre in New York, New York then went into release on September 6.

The screenplay was written by Perley Poore Sheehan and Edward T. Lowe Jr., based on Victor Hugo's 1831 novel and is notable for the grand sets that recall 15th century Paris as well as for Chaney's performance and make-up as the tortured hunchback bellringer Quasimodo. This was the seventh film adaptation of the novel. The film elevated Chaney, who was already a well-known character actor, to full star status in Hollywood and also helped set a standard for many later horror films, including Chaney's The Phantom of the Opera in 1925. Two classic stills showing Chaney as Quasimodo can be seen on the internet, highlighting the makeup job, as well as the film's program book.

In 1951, the film entered the public domain in the United States because the claimants neglected to renew its copyright registration in the 28th year after publication. Currently, the film is available on Blu-ray and DVD, although the existing prints (all copied from 16mm sources) are all missing at least 15 minutes of footage that was in the original 1923 35mm release print.

== Plot ==
The Hunchback of Notre Dame

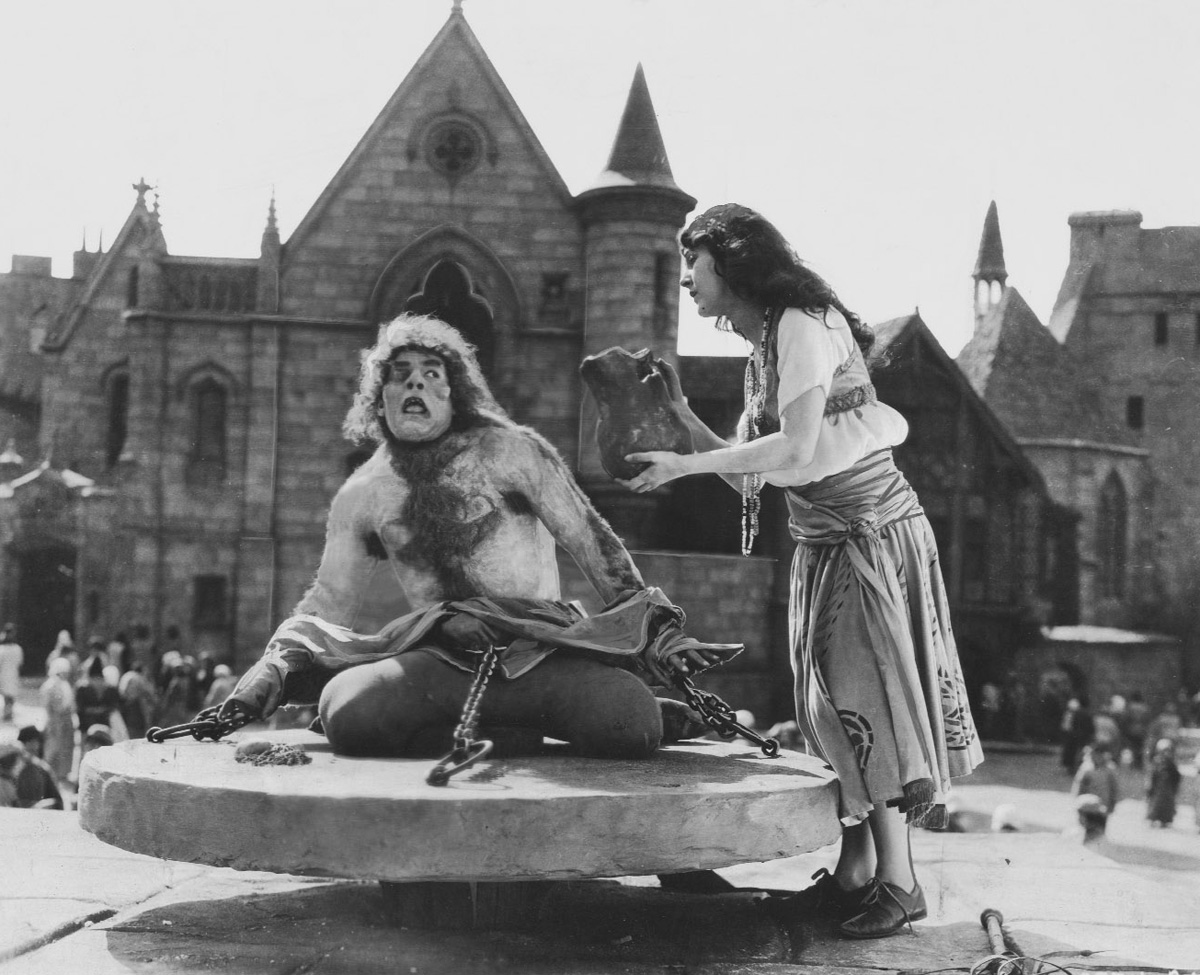
Quasimodo being offered water by Esmeralda.

The story is set in Paris in 1482. Quasimodo is a deaf, half-blind, hunchbacked bell-ringer of the famous Cathedral of Notre Dame in Paris. His master is a man named Jehan, the evil brother of Notre Dame's saintly archdeacon Dom Claude. One night, Jehan prevails upon Quasimodo to kidnap the fair Esmeralda, a dancing Roma girl (and the adopted daughter of Clopin, the king of the oppressed beggars of Paris' underworld).

The dashing Captain Phoebus rescues Esmeralda from Quasimodo, while Jehan abandons him and flees (later in the film, Quasimodo hates Jehan for abandoning him and is no longer loyal to him). At first seeking a casual romance, Phoebus becomes entranced by Esmeralda, and takes her under his wing. Quasimodo is sentenced to be lashed in the public square before Esmeralda and Dom Claude come to his aid.

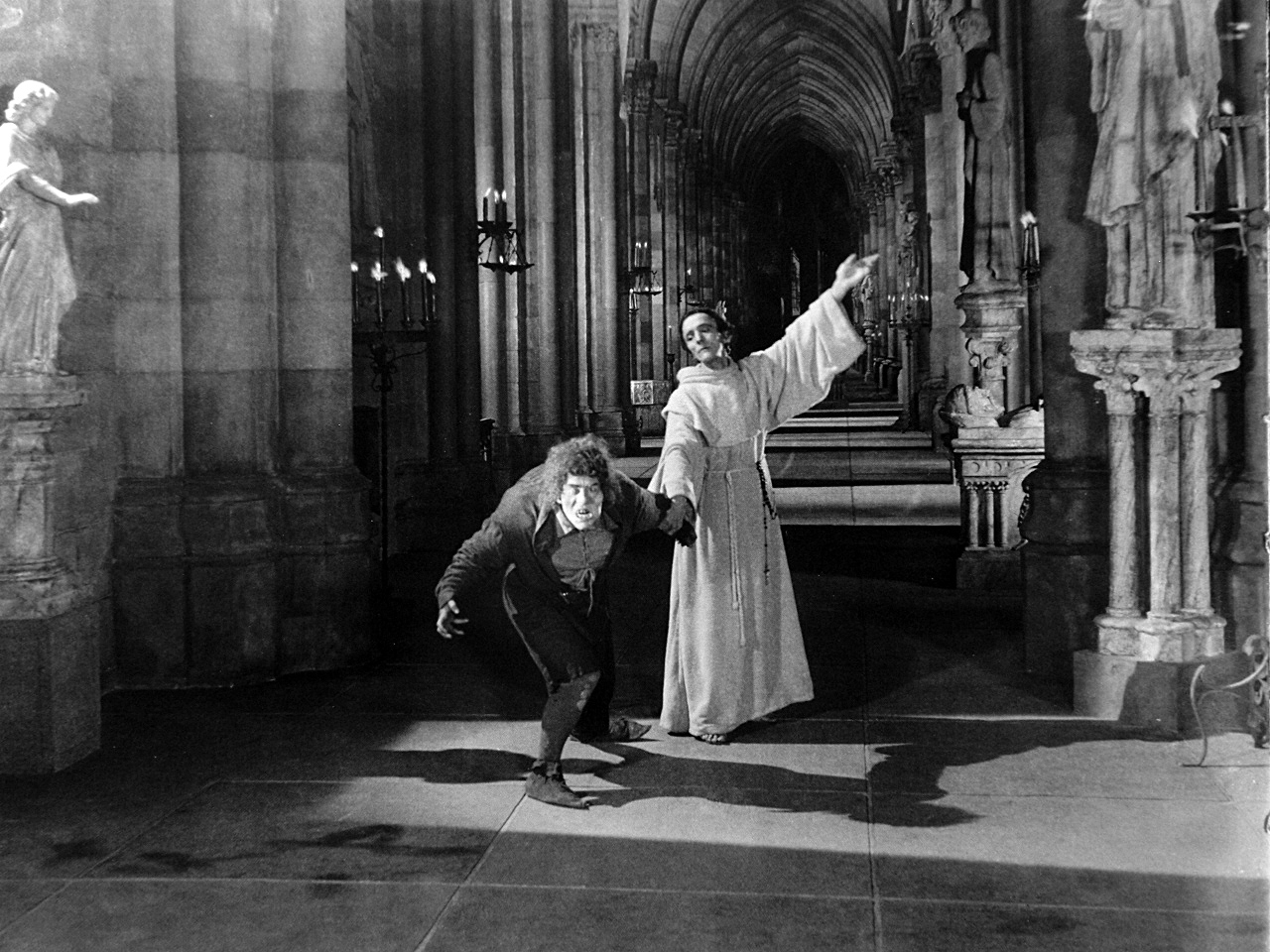
Dom Claude restrains Quasimodo from violence.

To their dismay, Jehan and Clopin learn that Phoebus hopes to marry Esmeralda, despite being engaged to Fleur de Lys. Phoebus persuades Esmeralda to accompany him to a ball celebrating his appointment as Captain of the Guard by King Louis XI. He provides her with rich garments and introduces her to their hostess, Madame de Gondelaurier, as a Princess of Egypt.

Clopin, accompanied by his beggars, crashes the festivities and demands Esmeralda be returned. To avoid bloodshed, Esmeralda says that she does not belong with the aristocracy. Later, however, Esmeralda sends the street poet Pierre Gringoire to give Phoebus a note, arranging a rendezvous at Notre Dame to say goodbye to him. Phoebus arrives and is stabbed in the back by Jehan. After Esmeralda is falsely sentenced to death for the crime, she is rescued from the gallows by Quasimodo and carried inside the cathedral, where he and Dom Claude grant her sanctuary.

Later that night, Clopin leads the whole of the underworld to storm the cathedral, and Jehan attempts to take Esmeralda, first by guile (telling her that Phoebus's dying wish was for him to take care of her), then by force. Quasimodo holds off the invaders with rocks and torrents of molten lead. Meanwhile, the healed Phoebus is alerted by Gringoire and leads his men against the rabble. Clopin is killed in the battle.

When Quasimodo finds Jehan attacking Esmeralda, he throws his former master off the ramparts of Notre Dame, but not before Jehan fatally stabs him three times in the back. Phoebus finds and embraces Esmeralda. Witnessing this, Quasimodo rings his own death toll, and Gringoire and Dom Claude enter the bell tower just in time to see him die. The last image is of the great bell swinging silently above Quasimodo's corpse.

== Cast ==
- Lon Chaney as Quasimodo
- Patsy Ruth Miller as Esmeralda
- Norman Kerry as Phoebus de Chateaupers
- Kate Lester as Madame de Gondelaurier
- Winifred Bryson as Fleur de Lys
- Nigel De Brulier as Dom Claude
- Brandon Hurst as Jehan
- Ernest Torrence as Clopin
- Tully Marshall as King Louis XI
- Harry von Meter as Monsieur Neufchatel
- Raymond Hatton as Gringoire
- Nick De Ruiz as Monsieur le Torteru
- Eulalie Jensen as Marie
- Roy Laidlaw as Charmolue
- Ray Myers as Charmolue's assistant
- William Parke as Josephus
- Gladys Brockwell as Sister Gudule
- John Cossar as Judge of the Court
- Edwin Wallock as King's Chamberlain
- Louise LaPlanche as a young Gypsy girl (extra)
- Elmo Lincoln
- Joe Bonomo (stunt double)
- Harvey Parry (stunt double)
- Cesare Gravina

== Production ==
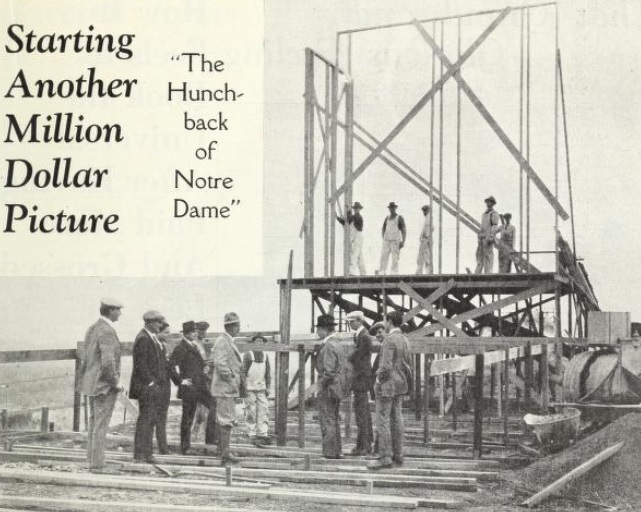
Worsley observing the erection of the first set in December 1922.

Long before the film was produced or shot, Lon Chaney was the industry favorite to play the role of Quasimodo. Film Daily stated it was essentially common knowledge that Chaney wanted to play the role of Quasimodo and even claimed that Chaney considered organizing a company to make the film abroad. It is known that Chaney had acquired the rights to produce the film in 1921 and had been actively engaged in negotiating the production with Universal. Evidence of Chaney's seriousness included plans to do the production abroad with a German studio, the Chelsea Pictures Company. In April 1922, Chelsea Pictures announced that Lon Chaney would star in the role of Quasimodo and that Alan Crosland would direct the film. The film failed to materialize and the company seems to have disappeared without a trace.

Irving Thalberg, who had previously worked with Chaney and Tod Browning, desired to make a production that would rise artistically above the otherwise expensive productions Universal produced. In order to convince Universal's founder, Carl Laemmle, to formally approve the production, Thalberg pitched Hunchback to him as "a love story". Bolstered by Chaney's recent box office successes, Laemmle agreed.

Universal Weekly, the house publication of Universal, formally announced the production of The Hunchback of Notre Dame in August 1922. The next issue stated that the Universal Scenario Department was working on the continuity and that preliminary plans for the sets were being drafted. In September 1922, Universal Weekly announced Lon Chaney's intention for it to have him act in his final "cripple role", following the successes of both The Miracle Man and The Penalty. Chaney's ownership of the film rights allowed him contractual latitude for far more artistic approval and control of this production than he had in previous ones so for this, he would thus serve as an uncredited, de facto producer; Thalberg was undoubtedly complicit in such an arrangement with it serving to prevent Carl Laemmle from cutting costs on the "artistic" production.

It is not known for certain but Lon Chaney is believed to have even been influential in the selection of the director, although Wallace Worsley, the final choice for director, had previously worked successfully with Chaney on four previous films (The Penalty, The Ace of Hearts, Voices of the City and A Blind Bargain, the last of which also featured Chaney as a hunchback) at Goldwyn, Michael Blake, a Lon Chaney scholar, states that Chaney's first choice for director was Erich von Stroheim at that time Universal's prized "name" director after the successes of Blind Husbands and Foolish Wives. However, Stroheim was fired by Thalberg from Universal before production on Hunchback commenced—ironically, due to Thalberg's fears that Stroheim would incur cost overruns on his own separate production, Merry-Go-Round.

Universal Weekly thus announced Wallace Worsley, pending approval from his then-home studio Paramount as the likely director of Hunchback in late November. Worsley's status as director, on loan from Paramount, was confirmed in the following issue, although such confirmation ran alongside an advertisement that stated Tod Browning would direct. (Note: Advertisements that Tod Browning would direct even after the announcement of Worsley's role was not singular. Another instance occurs two issues later and ran alongside another "moviegram" update.) Due to Worsley's prior commitments directing two other pictures for Paramount being extended due to the hurried replacement of their fatally ill star, Wallace Reid, with Jack Holt, the start date on Hunchback was pushed back nearly a month in order to accommodate Worsley; in the event, the second of the two films with Holt that Worsey was to direct was eventually helmed by Joseph Henabery, in his stead.

Universal announced its intentions to recreate the Notre Dame cathedral and the surrounding streets to the exacting specifications of the period. Universal staff set about creating the "Gallery of Kings", 35 statues, each 10 feet (3.0 m) high with intended likeness of the originals. The construction of the sets was estimated to take six months to complete. The screenplay was completed by Edward T. Lowe, Jr. and Perley Poore Sheehan by the end of 1922.

In the beginning of January, it was announced that film production began with the "Court of Miracles" setting. Shooting the Parisian underworld scene required a cast of some several hundred extras. (Note: Motion Picture News stated the court scenes consisted of a cast of 300 and 500 extras.) The construction of the Notre Dame set and the street settings had not yet been completed. In the beginning of February filming had moved to the Madame de Gondelaurier scenes. The production reportedly required three thousand costumes for extras, requiring six weeks for Universal costume department to complete.

In March, Film Daily reported Worsley had traded in his megaphone for a radio and loudspeaker to direct the large crowd of extras for the scenes. Radio Digest stated that it was a $7,000 radio and loudspeaker set up, equivalent to $132,000 in 2025.

Film Daily reported on June 8 that the filming of the camera shots had been completed and that Universal had signed a contract to lease the Astor Theatre for showing the film on September 2.

At the beginning of 1923, Universal's accounts believed that the cost of the production would be between $750,000 and $1,000,000. The film wound up costing $1,250,000 to produce and was in production from December 16, 1922 until June 8, 1923. It was the most expensive Lon Chaney film ever made. He was paid $2,500.00 per week salary.

Universal re-issued the movie with sound in the 1930s. For the reissue, four different soundtracks were created by Cecil Copping, Carl Edouarde, Hugo Riesenfeld and Heinz Eric Roehmeld.

=== Editing ===
In a November 1923 article for Screenland, film critic Robert E. Sherwood said he was called in, along with then-theater conductor Hugo Riesenfeld and animation producer Max Fleischer, to be "one of the army of cutters" hired to "whip (the film) into a form for popular consumption" after offering his opinion on a work print of Hunchback. Sherwood described what their editing entailed:

There were too many mob scenes, so these were cut to the bone. There were episodes that had no direct bearing on the story, so these were lopped out. There were characters overplayed, so these were trimmed. There were moments when the most important characters were allowed to drop out of sight, so the arrangement of sequences was altered in order that the distribution might be more even. All through the picture, the tempo was pepped up materially.

The work also involved rewording most of the original title cards, which "had been couched in the stilted phraseology of Victor Hugo's novel" or needed to be changed to fit the revised post-cutting continuity.

== Reception ==
The review aggregator website Rotten Tomatoes reported that 91% of critics have given the film a positive review based on 23 reviews, with a weighted average rating of 8.08/10. The site's critics consensus reads, "A heart-rending take on the classic book, with a legendary performance by Lon Chaney."

"Here then is a picture that will live forever. Chaney's portrayal of Quasimodo the hunchback is superb....a marvel of sympathetic acting. Chaney, in some miraculous way, awakens within us a profound feeling of sympathy and admiration for this most unfortunate and physically revolting human being." ---Motion Picture World

"Naturally there is much in this picture which is not pleasant...It is, however, a strong production, on which no pains or money have been spared to depict the seamy side of old Paris...It is a drama which will appeal to all those who are interested in fine screen acting, artistic settings and a remarkable handling of crowds who don't mind a grotesque figure and a grim atmosphere...Chaney throws his whole soul into making Quasimodo as repugnant as anything human could very well be, even to decorating his breast and back with hair" ---The New York Times

"Lon Chaney's remarkable performance as Quasimodo, the grateful hunchback, is, as it should be, easily the outstanding feature. His extraordinary make-up as a veritable living gargoyle reaches the limit of grotesquery (and at moments seems to go a shade beyond it) but his sprawling movements and frantic gestures are brilliantly conceived, and his final dance of frenzy at the defeat of Clopin's rabble is a scene of delirious passion which has seldom been equalled on the screen." ---Bioscope

"In spite of the liberties taken with the Victor Hugo novel, this picture is a superb and remarkably impressive spectacle ... with the addition of some of the most stupendous and interesting settings ever shown. [Chaney's] performance transcends anything he has ever done. He is weird, almost repellent at times, but always fascinating. This picture should be placed on your list and not missed by any means." --- Photoplay

"The Quasimodo of Lon Chaney is a creature of horror, a weird monstrosity of ape-like ugliness, such a fantastically effective makeup as the screen has never known, and in all human probability will never know again." ---Exhibitors Trade Review

"The Hunchback is a two-hour nightmare. It's murderous, hideous and repulsive. Hugo's tale is immortal; Laemmle's picture is fragile as a film house commodity...[The film] is misery all of the time, nothing but misery, tiresome, loathsome misery that doesn't make you feel any the better for it. Mr. Chaney's performance entitles him to starring honors....(the film) may become a detriment to the box office it plays for." ---Variety

"The one thing that stands out in one's memory is Quasimodo. Mr. Chaney's work will live in the memory when all else will have faded away. [The Hunchback] is an accomplishment of which any producer should feel proud." ---Harrison's Reports

== Preservation ==
The only surviving prints of the film are 16mm "show-at-home" prints distributed by Universal in the 1920s and 1930s for home-movie purposes, and no original nitrate 35mm negatives or prints exist. Most video editions (including public domain releases) of the film are derived from 16mm duplicate prints that were distributed by Blackhawk Films in the 1960s and 1970s.

A DVD release of a newly restored print of the film was released by Image Entertainment on October 9, 2007. A Blu-ray release of a newly restored print of the film was released by Flicker Alley on March 18, 2014. Another Blu-ray was released on September 28, 2021, by Kino Lorber with a brand new restoration from NBCUniversal.

A 100th anniversary screening of the film took place at the 2023 Calgary International Film Festival, with a new live score composed and performed by Chad VanGaalen.

== Vox Lumiere ==
Composer Kevin Saunders Hayes used this 1923 silent film in his Vox Lumiere 2005 theatre/concert production "Vox Lumiere - The Hunchback of Notre Dame".

== See also ==
- List of films in the public domain in the United States

== Bibliography ==
- Blake, Michael F. (1997). A Thousand Faces: Lon Chaney's Unique Artistry in Motion Pictures. New York: Vestal Press. ISBN 978-1-8795-1121-7.
- Fleming, E. J. (2007). Wallace Reid: The Life and Death of a Hollywood Idol. Jefferson, North Carolina: McFarland & Company, Inc. ISBN 978-0-7864-2815-1.
- Lennig, Arthur (2000). Stroheim. Lexington, Kentucky: The University Press of Kentucky. ISBN 978-0-8131-2138-3.
- Wakeman, John (1987). World Film Directors, Volume 1. New York, New York: The H. W. Wilson Company. ISBN 978-0-8242-0757-1.
