= Michelle Newell =

British actress (born 1951)

Michelle Newell (born 18 June 1951) is a British actress probably best known for her role in the BBC mini-series The Cleopatras and as Gill Gregory in Coronation Street. Other television credits include When the Boat Comes In (as Mary Seaton), Brimstone and Treacle (as Pattie Bates), Return of the Saint, Shoestring and The Professionals.

She has also appeared in various radio and theatrical roles, as well as the 1976 film version of The Likely Lads and the 1984 comedy film The Zany Adventures of Robin Hood, and has published a novel called Still Falls the Rain. She is married to John Clive, a fine artist and director and has one daughter, Florence.
