= Captain Phoebus =

- The Hunchback of Notre-Dame character
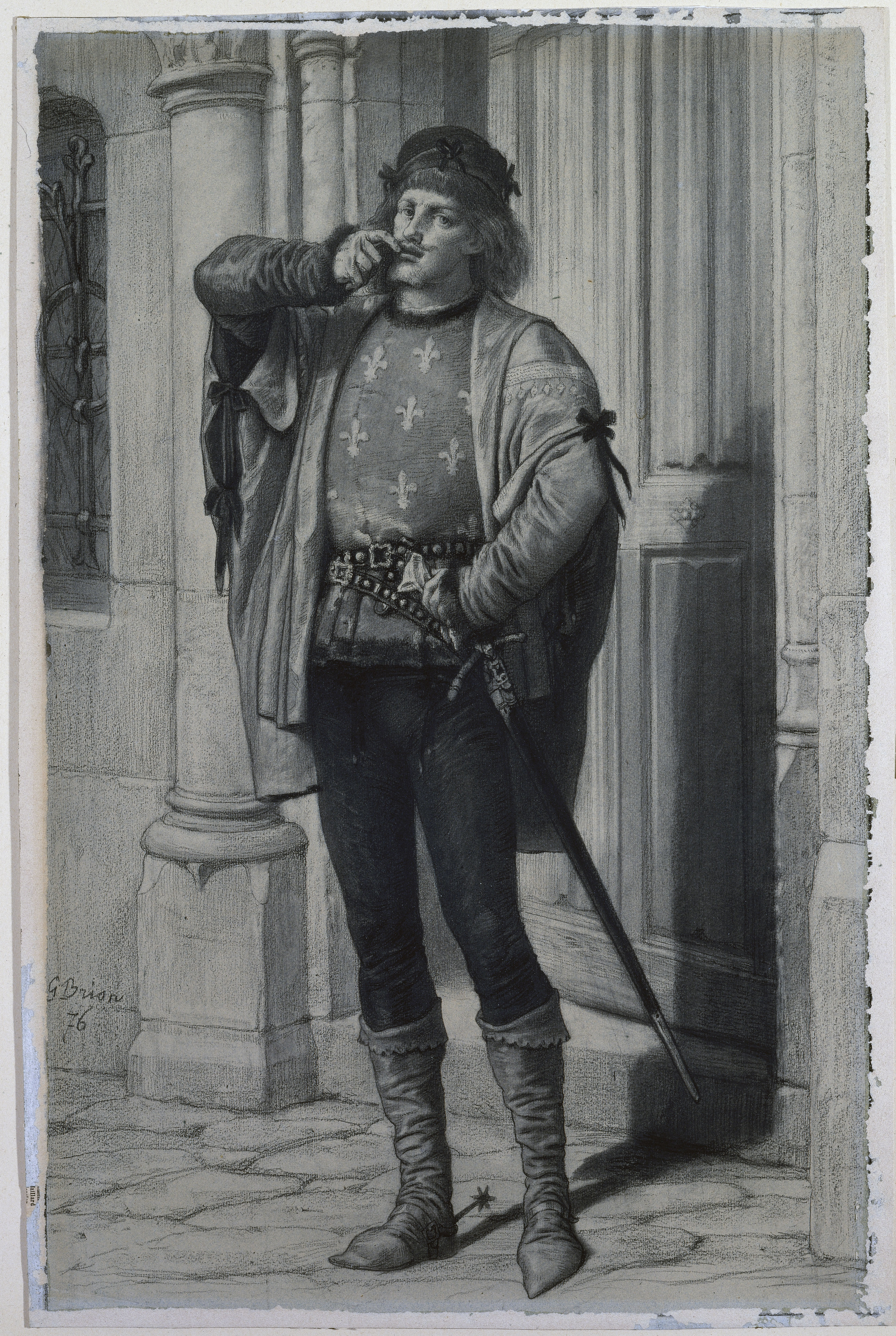
- Phoebus in an 1837 illustration
- First appearance: The Hunchback of Notre-Dame; March 16, 1831
- Created by: Victor Hugo

In-universe information
- Full name: Phoebus de Chateaupers
- Title: Captain
- Occupation: Captain of the King's Archers
- Affiliation: the King's Guards
- Spouse: Fleur-de-Lys de Gondelaurier (assumed)
- Nationality: French

Capitaine Phœbus de Châteaupers [febys də ʃɑtopɛːʁ] is a fictional character and the secondary antagonist of Victor Hugo's 1831 novel, Notre-Dame de Paris. He is the Captain of King Louis XI's Archers. His name comes from Phoebus, the Greek god of the sun (also called Apollo).

== In the novel ==
In the original novel, Phoebus is an antagonist. Despite being of noble birth and very handsome, he is also vain, untrustworthy, and a womaniser. He saves Esmeralda from Quasimodo and she falls in love with him. Phoebus makes a convincing show of returning her affections, but merely wants a night of passion. Esmeralda arranges to meet Phoebus and tells him of her love for him, and he convinces her that he feels the same way about her. He is in fact engaged to his cousin, Fleur-de-Lys de Gondelaurier, a spiteful socialite who is jealous of Esmeralda's beauty. Not only that, he has agreed to let Archdeacon Claude Frollo spy on his meeting with Esmeralda.

This decision proves his undoing, since as the couple flirts, Frollo attacks Phoebus and stabs him. Frollo makes a quick get-away and Phoebus is presumed dead, with Esmeralda, being the only one present, presumed to be the killer. Phoebus, however, is not dead and soon recovers from his injury. But this does not stop Esmeralda from being tried and sentenced to death for attempted murder and witchcraft. Phoebus has the power to prove her innocence, but he remains silent for fear of having his infidelity exposed. In the end of the novel, he marries Fleur-de-Lys, and watches Esmeralda's execution with apparently little or no remorse. While Phoebus is one of the few characters to survive in the novel, he does not escape punishment entirely, as Hugo implies that his marriage will not be a happy or romantic one.

== Adaptations ==
Most adaptations change Phoebus into a more positive character, sometimes even the primary love interest of Esmeralda. Among the actors who have played Phoebus over the years in each adaptation of the novel are:

Actor	Version
René Alexandre	1911 film
Herbert Heyes	The Darling of Paris (1917 film)
Arthur Kingsley	Esmeralda (1922 film)
Norman Kerry	1923 film
Alan Marshal	1939 film
Jean Danet	1956 film
Alexander Davion	1966 TV series
Richard Morant	1977 TV film
Robert Powell	1982 TV film
Benedick Blythe	1997 TV film
Patrick Fiori	1997-2002 musical
Vincent Elbaz	1999 parody film
Steve Balsamo	2000 musical - Original London Cast
Joseph Kloska (voice)	2008 BBC Radio adaptation
Andrew Samonsky	2014 musical
Will Griffith	2017 musical

=== Disney version ===
- Phoebus appears in The Hunchback of Notre Dame (1996), voiced by Kevin Kline. This version is the captain of Frollo's guard. He becomes fond of Esmeralda, such as complimenting her for fighting as well as a man, and the two fall in love. In the sequel, The Hunchback of Notre Dame II (2002), Phoebus and Esmeralda have a young son, Zephyr.
- Phoebus appears in Kingdom Hearts 3D: Dream Drop Distance, voiced by Phil LaMarr in English and Souma Suzuki in Japanese.
- Phoebus makes a cameo appearance in Once Upon a Studio.
