= List of exophonic writers =

This is a list of exophonic writers, i.e. those who write in a language not generally regarded as their first or mother tongue. For more on the phenomenon, see the main article Exophony.

The list below is deliberately brief, eschewing complex details of ethnicity/nationality and the like: the countries and/or languages given are merely a guide to the writer's principal origin and exophonic language - for details see the relevant article on the writer.

- Kader Abdolah, Persian–Dutch writer, poet and columnist who writes in Dutch
- Chingiz Abdullayev, Azerbaijani-Russian writer
- Melinda Nadj Abonji, Hungarian-German writer
- Chinua Achebe, Nigerian native, who lived most of his later life in the United States. Native speaker of Igbo who wrote primarily in English.
- Chinghiz Aitmatov, Kyrgyz-Russian novelist
- Gloria Alcorta, Argentinian-French writer
- Sholem Aleichem, native of the Russian Empire who later emigrated to Switzerland. His native language was Yiddish, but he also wrote in Hebrew and Russian.
- Vassilis Alexakis, Greek-French novelist
- Jeffrey Angles, American translator also known for his poetry and writing in Japanese
- Michael Arlen, Bulgarian born Armenian-British author
- Nadeem Aslam, Pakistani-British novelist
- Augustine of Hippo, Numidian Berber philosopher writing in Latin
- Ba Jin, Chinese and Esperanto author. He wrote three original works in Esperanto.
- Samuel Beckett, Irish-French playwright and novelist
- Guy Bennett, American poet and translator writing in English and French
- Costanzo Beschi, Italian-Tamil writer
- José María Blanco White, Spanish-English writer
- Karen Blixen (Isak Dinesen), Danish writer who wrote in both Danish and English
- Irena Brežná, Slovak-Swiss writer and journalist
- André Brink, (South African) English-Afrikaans novelist
- Joseph Brodsky, Russian-American poet and essayist
- Elias Canetti, Bulgarian born Sephardic writer, British citizen, writing in German
- Paul Celan, Romanian born poet writing in Romanian and German
- Chahan Chahnour, French-Armenian writer and poet
- Eugen Chirovici, Romanian-British novelist
- Don Mee Choi, Korean-American poet and translator
- Heciyê Cindî, Kurdish-Armenian writer and linguist
- Emil Cioran, Romanian-French writer
- Joseph Conrad, Polish-British novelist
- Pierre Cormon, French Swiss writer who wrote books in English and Brazilian Portuguese
- Adolfo Costa du Rels, Bolivian Spanish writer in French
- Sahar Delijani, Iranian American novelist
- David Dephy, Georgian-American poet novelist essayist multi-media artist
- Ariel Dorfman, Chilean-American writer
- Raymond Federman, French-American novelist
- Boris Fishman, Russian-American novelist
- Kahlil Gibran, Lebanese-American poet
- Julien Green, American writer who wrote in French
- Xiaolu Guo, Chinese-British novelist
- Najat El Hachmi, Moroccan-Catalan novelist and journalist
- Aleksandar Hemon, Bosnian-American novelist and journalist
- Stefan Heym, German-American novelist
- Rolando Hinojosa, American-Mexican novelist
- Anselm Hollo, Finnish-American poet
- Khalid Hosseini, Afghan-American novelist
- Nancy Huston, Canadian novelist
- Kazuo Ishiguro, Japanese-British novelist
- Fleur Jaeggy, Swiss-Italian writer
- Helena Janeczek, German-Italian writer
- Tahar Ben Jelloun, Moroccan-French novelist
- Ha Jin, Chinese-American poet and novelist
- Diego Jourdan Pereira, Uruguayan author who writes in English
- Vahé Katcha, Armenian-French writer
- Hans Keller, Austrian-British musicologist and essayist in English
- Jack Kerouac, American novelist and poet
- Yasmina Khadra, Algerian-French novelist
- Imam Ahmad Raza Khan, Indian Urdu-Arabic-Persian-Hindi Sufi poet and writer.
- Arthur Koestler, Hungarian-British author and journalist
- Jerzy Kosiński, Polish-American writer
- Agota Kristof, Hungarian-French novelist
- Milan Kundera, Czech-French writer
- Jhumpa Lahiri, British-American writer, writing in Italian
- Tahar Lamri, Algerian-Italian journalist and short story writer
- Aga Lesiewicz, Polish-British novelist
- Hideo Levy, American-born Japanese language author
- Yiyun Li, Chinese-American novelist and short story writer
- Clarice Lispector, Ukrainian-Brazilian novelist
- Jonathan Littell, American-French novelist
- Ramon Llull, Majorcan, Catalan-Latin-Arabic writer
- Lucian, second-century AD Syrian satirist, a native speaker of Syriac who wrote in Attic Greek
- Amin Maalouf, Lebanese-French novelist
- Merab Mamardashvili, Georgian philosopher who wrote exclusively in Russian
- Yann Martel, Francophone Canadian writing in English
- Vladimir Nabokov, Russian-American novelist
- C.W. Nicol, Welsh-Japanese writer
- Téa Obreht, Bosniak-American novelist
- Saïdeh Pakravan, Iranian (Persian)/French writer in English
- Fernando Pessoa, Portuguese-English/French poet
- Edith Philips, American-French language writer and educator
- Atiq Rahimi, Afghan/Persian-French and English novelist and filmmaker
- Ayn Rand, Russian-American novelist
- Rafael Sabatini, Italian-British popular novelist in English
- Elif Şafak, Turkish-English novelist and journalist
- Edward Said, Palestinian-American literary critic and philosopher
- Kurban Said, pseudonymous Azerbaijani novelist in German
- Lori Saint-Martin, Canadian novelist and translator in French.
- George Santayana (Jorge de Santayana y Borrás), Spanish-American philosopher and novelist in English
- Emine Sevgi Özdamar, Turkish-German writer
- Shahan Shahnour, Armenian-French writer under penname Armen Lubin
- Mohammad-Hossein Shahriar, Turkish-Persian poet
- Gary Shteyngart, Russian-American novelist
- Shumona Sinha, Indian-French novelist
- Saša Stanišić, Bosnian-German writer
- Tom Stoppard, Czech-British playwright
- Albert Szent-Györgyi, Hungarian biochemist and essayist in English
- Yoko Tawada, Japanese-German writer
- Stefan Themerson, Polish-French-English novelist, poet, filmmaker
- R.S. Thomas, English poet, Welsh memoirist and autobiographer
- Matthew Tree, English-Catalan writer and novelist
- Héctor Tobar, Guatemalan-American journalist and novelist
- Ayelet Tsabari, Israeli-Canadian writer
- Anselm Turmeda, Majorcan, Catalan-Arabic writer
- Tristan Tzara, Romanian-French poet and DADAist
- Chika Unigwe, Nigerian-Flemish writer
- Voltaire, French philosopher who also wrote and published in English
- Elie Wiesel, Romanian (Yiddish-speaking) political activist and author, writing in French and English
- Yang Yi, Chinese-Japanese author
- David Zoppetti, Swiss-Japanese novelist and journalist
