= Exophony =

Writing in non-native language

Exophony is the practice of writing, usually creative, in a language that is not the writer's mother tongue. While the practice is age-old, the term is relatively new: French linguists such as Louis-Jean Calvet have only discussed "littérature exophone" since 1979, while the German equivalent, Exophonie, was used within the field of literary and cultural studies by Susan Arndt, Dirk Naguschewski and Robert Stockhammer in 2007. In English, Chantal Wright proposed its more widespread use in 2008, wrote a paper on it in 2010, and went on to teach a course at the University of Warwick in 2016/7.

Some exophonic authors may be bilingual or multilingual from their childhood years, even polyglots, while others may write in an acquired language. In some cases the second language is acquired early in life, for example through immigration, and it is not always clear whether the writer should strictly be classed a non-native speaker. However, by no means all bilingual/multilingual writers are exophonic. For instance, J. M. Coetzee has commented that despite being bilingual in English and Afrikaans and having "a fairly wide-ranging acquaintance with Spanish", he has "absolutely no competence as a writer" in that language, and even his "command of English, spoken and written, feels like the kind of command a foreigner might have”. He further says that "the versions that my translators produce are in no way inferior to the original” and even that "the Spanish translation of 'El Polaco' reflects [my] intentions more clearly than the original English text does", adding that he likes being “read in a language in which I feel myself to be a somewhat more humorous writer than in the original”.

In other cases, the language is acquired through exile or migration. In Europe, exophonic writing has seen an increase in Europe due to labour migration.

It is a form of transnational literature, although the latter also encompasses writing that crosses national stylistic or cultural boundaries without being written in another language. "Extraterritoriality and exophony are indeed important notions, not only for comparative literature but in general for the question of the status of the literary text [of] the 21st century".

It also overlaps with translingualism, and translingualist writer is one of many terms that has been coined to describe the phenomenon. Related concepts in English include transculturalism/transculturation, axial writing, postnationalism and postcolonialism, and in German, Exophonie, Anders-Sprachigkeit, Interkulturelle Literatur ('intercultural literature'), Gastarbeiterliteratur ('guest worker literature'), Ausländerliteratur ('foreigner literature') and Migrantenliteratur ('migrant literature'). In Japanese the term used is 越境文学 (ekkyō-bungaku, lit. border-crossing literature). The scholar Yuri Kumagai wrote that it "is said to shatter the myth of unique difficulty of Japanese, and bring new perspectives and creative power into the language", and that it can challenge "categories that mark what/who is inside and outside".

Motivations for becoming an exophonic writer may be manifold: to make a political statement (for example, Yoko Tawada attempted "to produce exophony both in her mother tongue [Japanese] and her acquired tongue [German] ... to dismantle ... the ultranationalistic concept of a 'beautiful' Japanese language"), to adopt/avoid stylistic elements of particular languages ("for Tawada, a native speaker of a language whose grammar makes no distinctions of gender, case, definite and indefinite articles, or singular and plural ... each Western word, phrase or idiom becomes a conundrum", "I grope for some unlikely expression in my native language, trying to find the proper equivalence in translation for an English word or phrase"), to evade the risk of being lost in translation, or to gain a wider readership – translated literature in the UK and US accounts for only a small percentage of sales, so "it makes commercial sense". When asked why he didn’t write in his native language, Joseph Conrad replied, "I value too much our beautiful Polish literature to introduce into it my worthless twaddle. But for Englishmen my capacities are just sufficient." It may defy definition: when Chika Unigwe was asked whether her writing felt Belgian or Nigerian, she said it "depended on the time of day ... some stories needed to be written in English, whereas others could only be told in Dutch". Argentinian podcaster and author Zoe Gomez Cassardo has commented that in addition to the reasons above, she writes in English because she doesn't know "which Spanish" to write in, the number of variants and lack of standardization conversely making her mother tongue a harder choice.

Some exophonic authors are also translators, including in some cases of their own works. The phenomenon of translating into a second language is generally referred to as "L2 translation", and there was once "strong resistance to it on the grounds of it being perceived as unprofessional and inherently deficient […] although the academic dispute about [its] validity seems decidedly milder now".

Conversely, translation of exophonic works can present problems due to the "defamiliarization of the new language through stylistic innovation".

== Recognition ==
Many exophonic authors have won recognition for their writing via top literary awards, as well as a variety of national honours and distinctions. The Prix Rivarol was specifically awarded to novels in French by 'non-first language' authors, as was the Adelbert von Chamisso Prize for non-native German works. Even awards that have been historically limited to native speakers for decades, such as the Akutagawa Prize, have now begun to be awarded to non-natives and even non-nationals.

Some examples include :

- Chinua Achebe: Man Booker International Prize
- Gloria Alcorta: fr:Prix Rivarol
- Samuel Beckett: Prix Formentor, Nobel Prize
- Joseph Brodsky: Nobel Prize
- Emil Cioran: fr:Prix Rivarol
- Adolfo Costa du Rels: Gulbenkian Prize, fr:Prix Rivarol
- Kazuo Ishiguro: Whitbread Prize, Booker Prize, Nobel Prize; OBE, Chevalier de l'Ordre des Arts et des Lettres, Order of the Rising Sun, Knight Bachelor
- Vahé Katcha: fr:Prix Rivarol
- Ágota Kristóf: ADELF Prix Europe, Gottfried Keller Preis, Austrian State Prize for European Literature
- Milan Kundera: Prix Médicis, Mondello Prize, Herder Prize, Jerusalem Prize, Ovid Prize
- fr:Bruce Lowery: fr:Prix Rivarol
- Amin Maalouf: Prix Goncourt, Prix Méditerranée, Prince of Asturias Award, Sheikh Zayed Book Award; elected to Académie française, National Order of Merit, Royal Society of Literature
- Yann Martel: Man Booker Prize, Asian/Pacific American Award for Literature, etc.
- Melinda Nadj Abonji: German Book Prize, Swiss Book Prize
- fr:Piotr Rawicz: fr:Prix Rivarol
- Emine Sevgi Özdamar: Ingeborg Bachmann Prize, etc.
- Shahan Shahnour (as Armen Lubin): fr:Prix Rivarol
- Saša Stanišić: Alfred Döblin Prize, German Book Prize
- Tom Stoppard: Academy Award, British Academy Film Award, Golden Globe Award; CBE, etc.
- Yoko Tawada: Akutagawa Prize (for a work in Japanese, not exophonic), Goethe Medal, Kleist Prize
- Chika Unigwe: Nigeria Prize for Literature
- Elie Wiesel: fr:Prix Rivarol, Prix Médicis, Nobel Peace Prize
- Yang Yi: Akutagawa Prize
- David Zoppetti: ja:すばる文学賞

Please note that the list above is by no means exhaustive.

== See also ==
- List of exophonic writers
- Second language writing
