= The Hunchback (1997 film) =

1997 television film by Peter Medak

- Written by: John Fasano
- Directed by: Peter Medak
- Starring: Mandy Patinkin; Richard Harris; Salma Hayek; Edward Atterton; Benedick Blythe
- Music by: Edward Shearmur
- Countries of origin: United States; Hungary; Canada; Czech Republic
- Original language: English

Production
- Producer: Stephane Reichel
- Cinematography: Elemér Ragályi
- Editor: Jay Cassidy
- Running time: 99 minutes
- Production companies: Adelson-Baumgarten Productions; Alliance Communications Corporation; Stillking Films; Transatlantic Media Associates; TriStar Television; Turner Entertainment

Original release
- Network: TNT
- Release: March 16, 1997

The Hunchback is a 1997 made-for-television romantic drama film based on Victor Hugo's 1831 novel The Hunchback of Notre-Dame, directed by Peter Medak and produced by Stephane Reichel. It stars Richard Harris as Claude Frollo, Salma Hayek as Esmeralda and Mandy Patinkin as Quasimodo, the titular hunchback of Notre Dame. The film premiered on March 16, 1997, on TNT.

== Plot ==
The film opens in Paris in the year 1480 with a prologue establishing a world where the Catholic Church holds absolute power and suppresses modern ideas like the printing press. On the steps of Notre Dame Cathedral, Dom Claude Frollo (played by Richard Harris), the archdeacon, discovers a severely deformed baby abandoned in the rain. He takes pity on the child, names him Quasimodo, and decides to raise him within the cathedral's walls.

Twenty-five years later, in 1505, Quasimodo (played by Mandy Patinkin) has grown into the deaf, hunchbacked bell-ringer of Notre Dame. On the day of the Feast of Fools, he ventures outside the cathedral for the first time and is crowned the "King of Fools" by Clopin, the King of the Roma (Gypsies) . It is there that the beautiful Romani dancer, Esmeralda (played by Salma Hayek), captivates the crowd with her dancing, and both Quasimodo and the wandering poet Pierre Gringoire (played by Edward Atterton) are enchanted by her. Archdeacon Frollo, watching from a cathedral niche, also falls into a powerful and obsessive lust for her. Frollo stops the festivities, scolds Quasimodo for disobeying him and leaving Notre Dame, and warns him he will face the consequences if he does so again.

Consumed by his forbidden desires, Frollo engages in self-flagellation as penance but is unable to control his lust. He decides to possess Esmeralda and hires two guards to kidnap her. The attempt is thwarted by Gringoire and Quasimodo, who come to her defense, leading to Quasimodo's capture. In a separate incident, Gringoire finds himself in the Court of Miracles, the secret Roma encampment, and is nearly hanged for trespassing. Esmeralda saves him by agreeing to a sham marriage, which is officiated by Clopin himself.

Outraged by Quasimodo's defiance, Frollo arranges for an innocent Quasimodo to be publicly whipped for the supposed crime of attacking Esmeralda. During the brutal torture, Esmeralda begs King Louis XII (played by Nigel Terry) to stop it, but the King dismisses her plea. For an hour, Quasimodo is left in the stocks as the crowd throws fruit and mocks him. When he begs for water, the crowd taunts him by shouting "Water" back at him. Frollo watches but, despite the pleas of his fellow clergymen, he refuses to help. Ultimately, it is Esmeralda who approaches the scaffold and offers him a drink of water—an act of profound kindness that causes Quasimodo to fall deeply and innocently in love with her.

As time passes, Esmeralda and Gringoire's marriage of convenience blossoms into genuine love, fueling Frollo's jealousy. One day, Frollo disguises himself and reveals his obsessive feelings to Esmeralda. Frightened by his advances, she reads his palm, sees a vision of death, and flees, dropping her knife. Frollo seizes the weapon and uses it to stab Minister Gauchére, a man he believes is a sinner for reading forbidden books and encouraging the development of the printing press, framing Esmeralda for the murder. Esmeralda is arrested, subjected to brutal torture with a metal boot, and found guilty. Frollo visits her in prison and offers to spare her life if she gives herself to him, but she refuses.

At the gallows, Quasimodo swings down from the cathedral on a rope to save Esmeralda, declaring sanctuary within Notre Dame and taking her to the bell tower. Captain Phoebus and his guards storm the cathedral, but Quasimodo successfully defends it by throwing stones and other objects at them. While in the cathedral, Esmeralda and Quasimodo become close friends. He shows her the bells and tells her of his plan to write a 600-page book. When she expresses missing her goat, Djali, Quasimodo ventures back to the Court of Miracles to retrieve it. Before he leaves, he entrusts his book to Gringoire to distribute to the people of Paris.

When Quasimodo returns, he finds Esmeralda is gone. He confronts Frollo, who admits he has handed her over to the authorities. Frollo reveals the truth of Quasimodo's origins, denouncing him as a cursed freak, and brutally whips him. He attempts to strike him again, but the hunchback finally stands up for himself.

Esmeralda is once again led to be hanged. As the execution is about to take place, the Roma rebel and demand her freedom. Quasimodo, now at the top of Notre Dame, confronts Frollo, hanging him over the edge of a balcony. He forces the archdeacon to confess his crime to the crowd below. Believing that his confession will bring him absolution, Frollo screams, "It was I!", shocking King Louis XII. Esmeralda is freed.

She runs back to Notre Dame to thank Quasimodo, but Frollo, once again overcome with temptation, attempts to stab her. Quasimodo intervenes and takes the blade himself. A final fight breaks out between Quasimodo and Frollo, leading to Frollo falling from the cathedral to his death.

In his final moments, as Esmeralda tries to tend to his stab wound, Quasimodo tells her that the pain is too much, and that the biggest wound lies in his heart. He dies peacefully as Esmeralda and Gringoire ring the bells of Notre Dame in tribute to him.

== Cast ==
- Mandy Patinkin as Quasimodo
- Richard Harris as Dom Claude Frollo
- Salma Hayek as Esmeralda
- Edward Atterton as Gringoire
- Benedick Blythe as Phoebus
- Nigel Terry as King Louis XII
- Jim Dale as Clopin
- Trevor Baxter as Chief Lawyer
- Vernon Dobtcheff as Father Michel
- Nickolas Grace as Minister Gauchére
- Matthew Sim as Crippled Man
- Cassie Stuart as Colette
- Gabriella Fon as Queen Anne

== Production ==
The filming locations were Budapest, Prague, and Rouen from July through September 1996. This television film was released a year after Disney's animated musical version. Mandy Patinkin had been cast as Quasimodo in Disney's version, but left the role when he clashed with producers over the portrayal.

"I wanted to play Quasimodo for real," says Patinkin, who won a Tony for "Evita" and an Emmy for CBS' "Chicago Hope." But the producers wanted something different. "They had their own Disney needs," he explains. "I just right there at the audition said, 'I can't do this.' "

== Reception ==
The film received mixed reviews from critics. Howard Rosenberg of The Los Angeles Times said the TV version was well-produced but inferior to Victor Hugo's book. He liked Richard Harris's strong acting and thought Salma Hayek was attractive, but was critical of Mandy Patinkin as Quasimodo, saying his performance wasn’t as touching as Charles Laughton's in the 1939 movie Josh O'Connor of The New York Times also praised Harrris' performance, but dubbed the film 'old fashioned'. Variety praised the production design, but criticised the script as a 'flat adaptation'.

== Differences from the novel ==
While the novel takes place in the 1470s-80s during the reign of Louis XI, this version moves the setting to the 1500s and the reign of Louis XII.
