= Edward Atterton =

English actor

Edward Julian Atterton
- Born: 24 January 1962 (age 64); Tamworth, Staffordshire, England
- Occupation: Actor
- Years active: 1993–2005
- Spouse: Kelly Atterton

Edward Atterton (born 24 January 1962 in Tamworth, Staffordshire, England) is an English businessman and former actor.

== Biography ==
Atterton was born in 1962 to Dr David Valentine Atterton (1927-2002), C.B.E., F.Eng, F.I.M., chairman of Guinness Mahon, director of Barclays Bank and the Bank of England, former Research Fellow in the Department of Metallurgy at Cambridge University and sometime President of the Institute of Metals, and Sheila Atterton, of Cathedral Green House, Wells, Somerset. He attended Rugby School and then Eton College. He read Social Anthropology at Trinity College, Cambridge (B.A. 1984, M.A. 1988). After two years of living in Japan, he returned to the UK and enrolled in the Central School of Speech and Drama.

In 1997, Atterton began dating actress Salma Hayek and moved to Los Angeles to be closer to her. The couple broke up in 2000. He is married to Kelly Atterton, the West Coast editor for Allure magazine. He and Kelly share a daughter, Piper, born 23 December 2004, and son Rex, born 18 October 2008. Atterton has a black belt in karate.

In 2005, Atterton left acting to become the principal manager for the Los Angeles branch of Jigsaw London, whose co-founder, John Robinson, is the partner of his sister, Bella Atterton.

== Selected filmography ==
Year	Title	Role	Notes
1994	Sharpe's Honour	Captain Peter D'Alembord	TV series
1996	Far Harbor	Frick	Feature film
1997	The Hunchback	Gringoire	Feature film
1998	The Man in the Iron Mask	Lt. Andre	Feature film
1998	Three	Jonathan Vance	TV series
1999	Ichigensan	Me (Boku)	Feature film
2000	Britannic	Chaplain Reynolds	Feature film
2000	Relative Values	Nigel Marshwood	Feature film
2001	The Mists of Avalon	Arthur	Miniseries
2001	Alias	Dr. Daniel 'Danny' Hecht	Episode: "Truth Be Told"
2001	Hans Christian Andersen: My Life as a Fairytale	Prince Christian	Television film
2002	Firefly	Atherton Wing	Episode: "Shindig"
2003	Frank Herbert's Children of Dune	Duncan Idaho	Miniseries
2003	Charmed	Mordaunt	Episode: "Sword and the City"
2003	Carolina	Heath Pierson	Direct to DVD film

== See also ==
- The Mists of Avalon (TV miniseries)
- Frank Herbert's Children of Dune
- Jigsaw (clothing retailer)
