= Les Useres =

- Municipality
- Les Useres/Useras
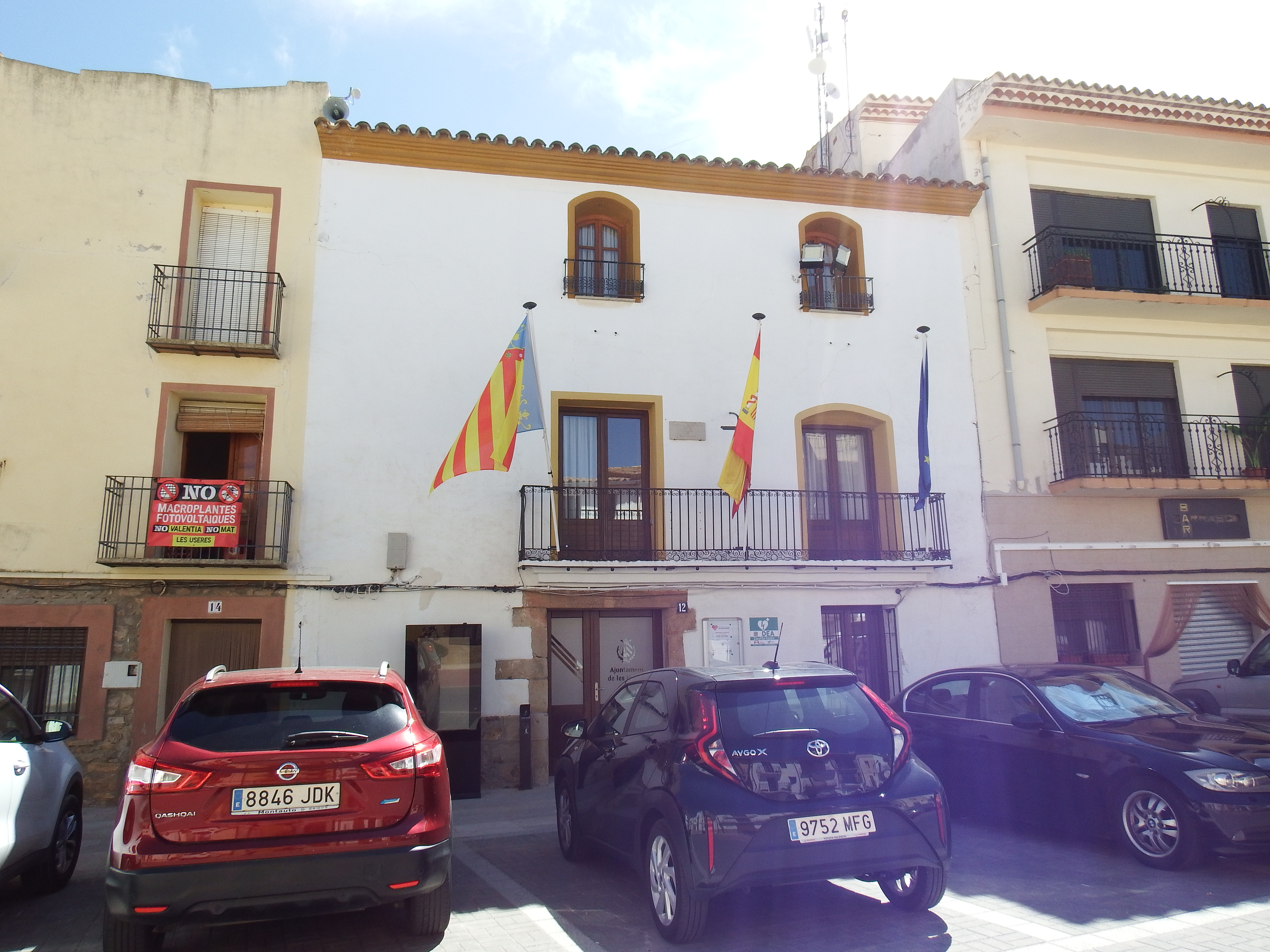
- Town hall

- Coat of arms

- Location in Spain
- Coordinates: 40°9′25″N 0°9′54″W
- Country: Spain
- Autonomous community: Valencian Community
- Province: Castellón
- Comarca: Alcalatén
- Judicial district: Castellón de la Plana

Government
  - Alcaldesa: Delia Valero Ferri (2007) (PSOE)

Area
  - Total: 80.7 km^{2} (31.2 sq mi)
- Elevation: 401 m (1,316 ft)

Population (2025-01-01)
  - Total: 954
  - Density: 11.8/km^{2} (30.6/sq mi)
- Demonym: Useranos
- Time zone: UTC+1 (CET)
  - Summer (DST): UTC+2 (CEST)
- Postal code: 12118
- Official language(s): Valencian
- Website: Official website

Les Useres (Valencian: [lez uˈzeɾes]) (known in Spanish as Useras (Spanish: [uˈseɾas]) is a municipality in the comarca of Alcalatén in the Valencian Community, Spain. In August 2007, 120 residents had to be evacuated as a result of a forest fire.

== Gallery ==
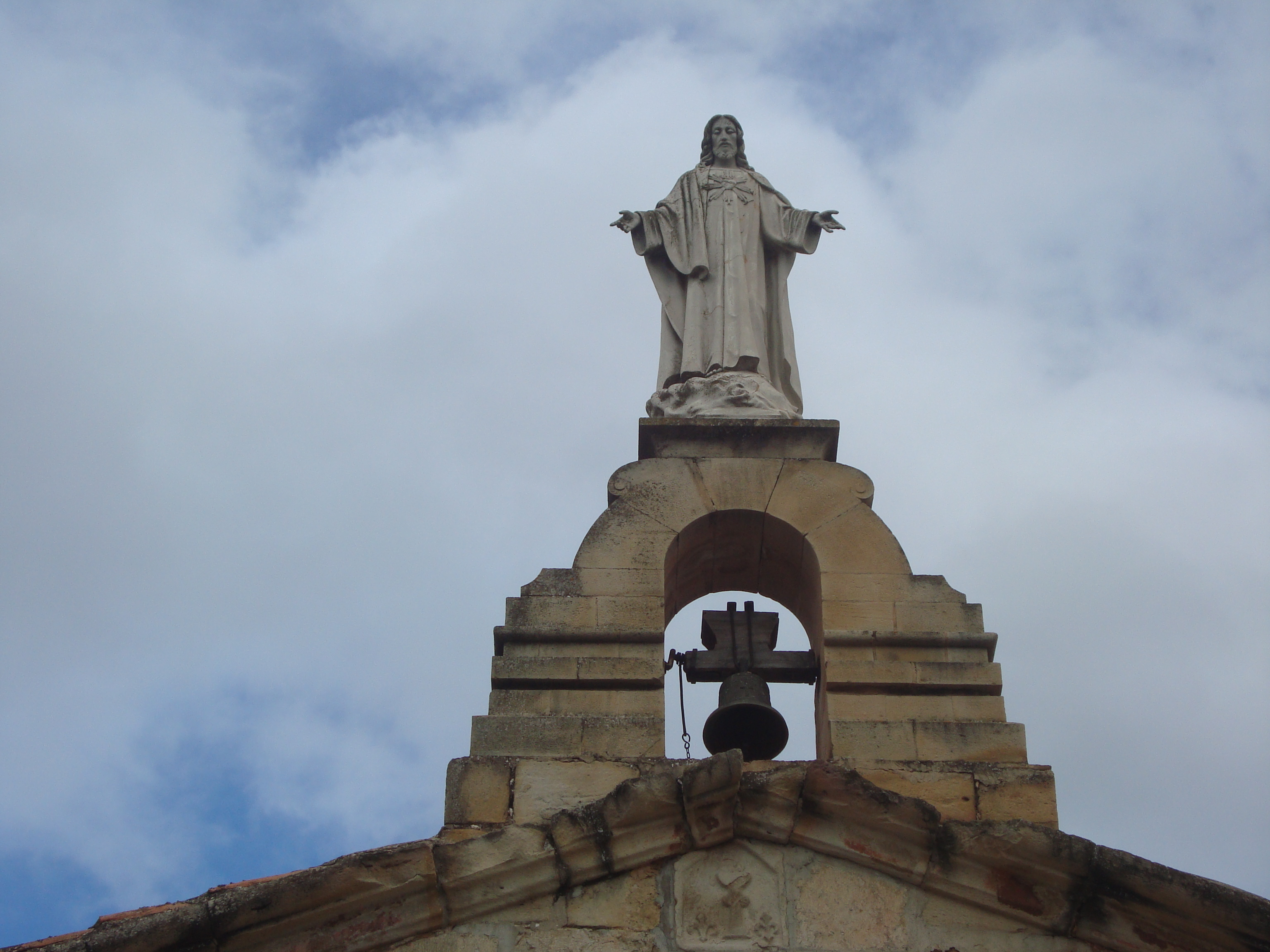
Christ of l'Agonia (Les Useres)

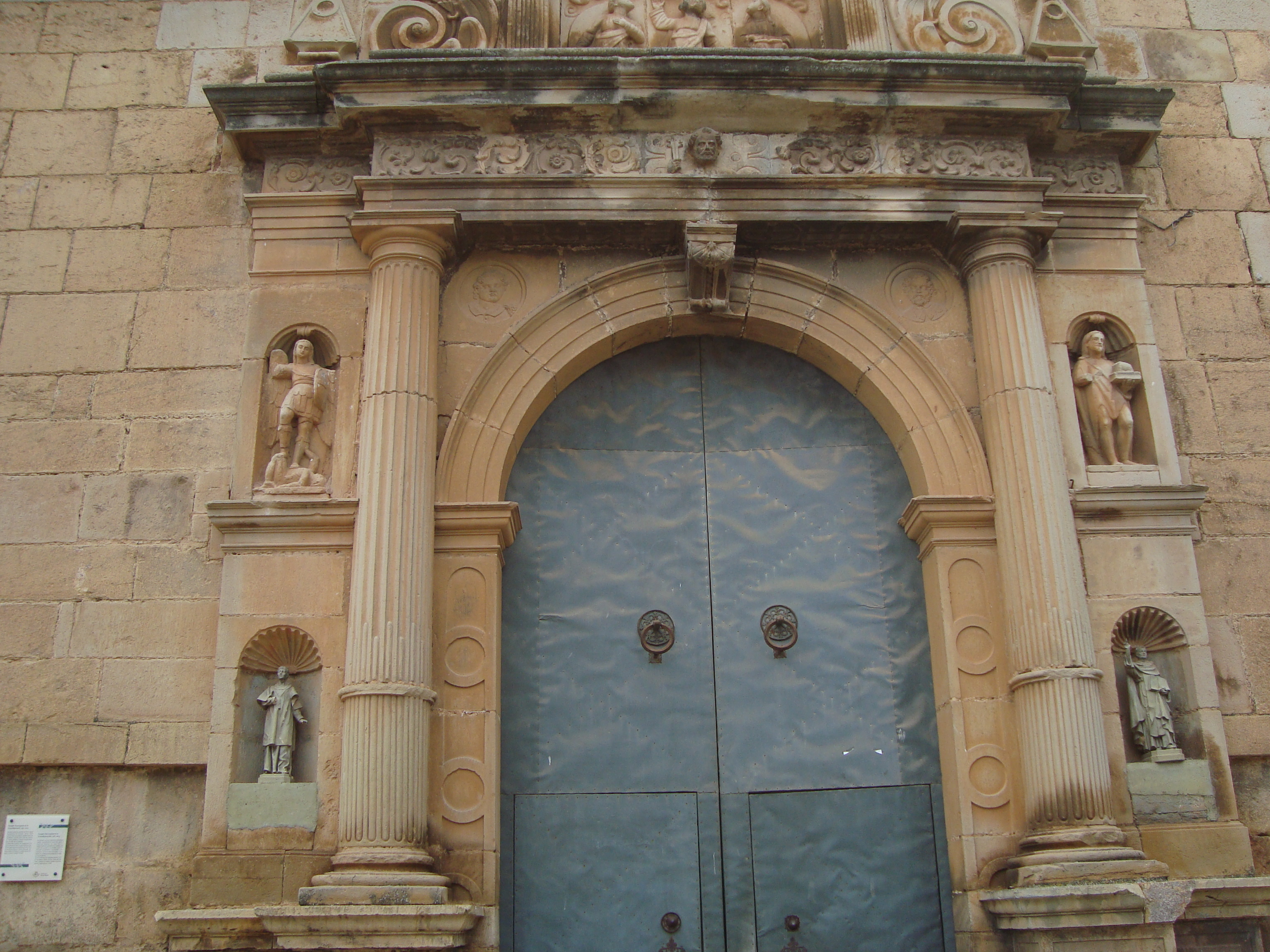
Portico of the Església parroquial in Les Useres

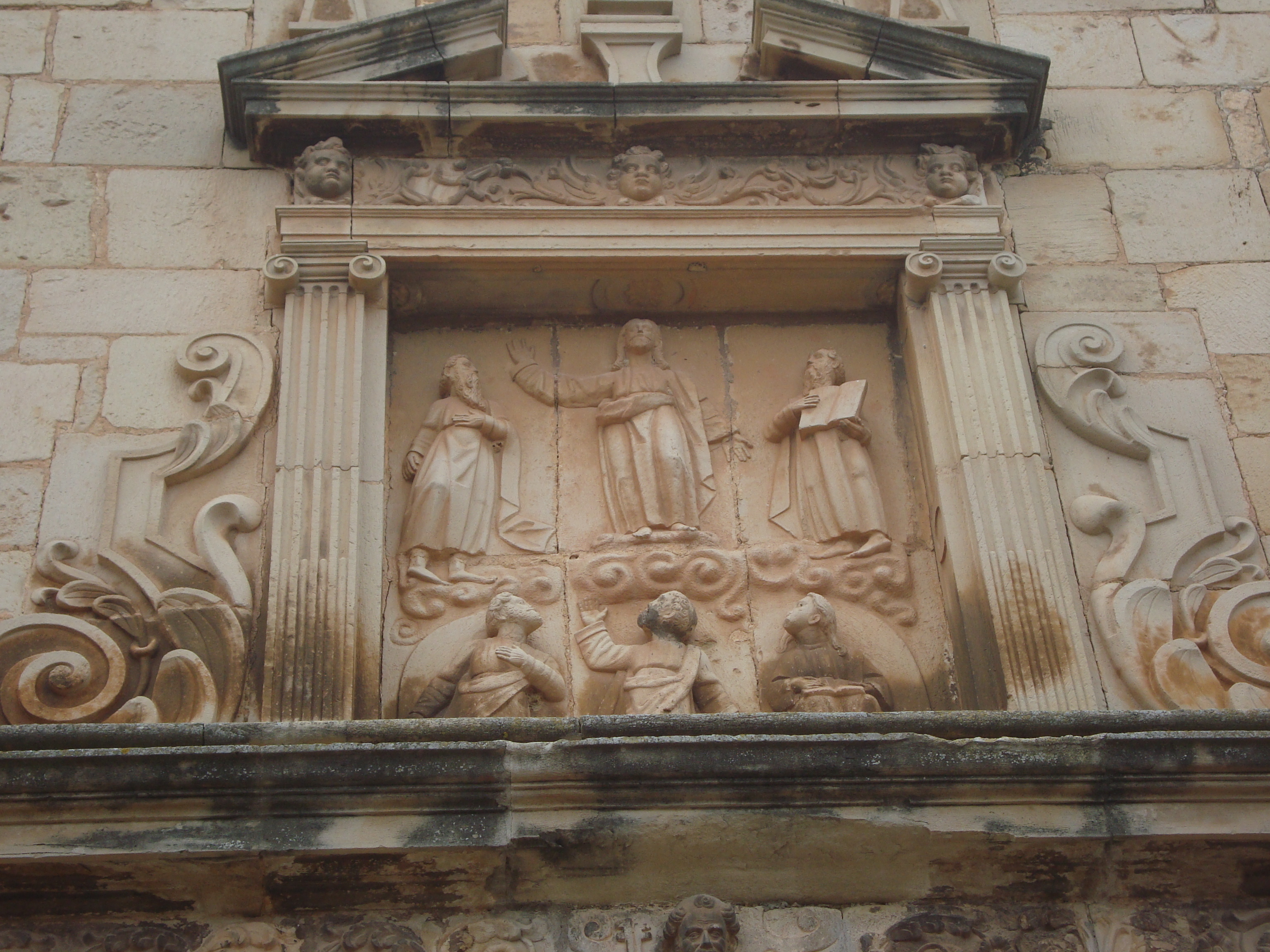
Altarpiece of the Transfiguració

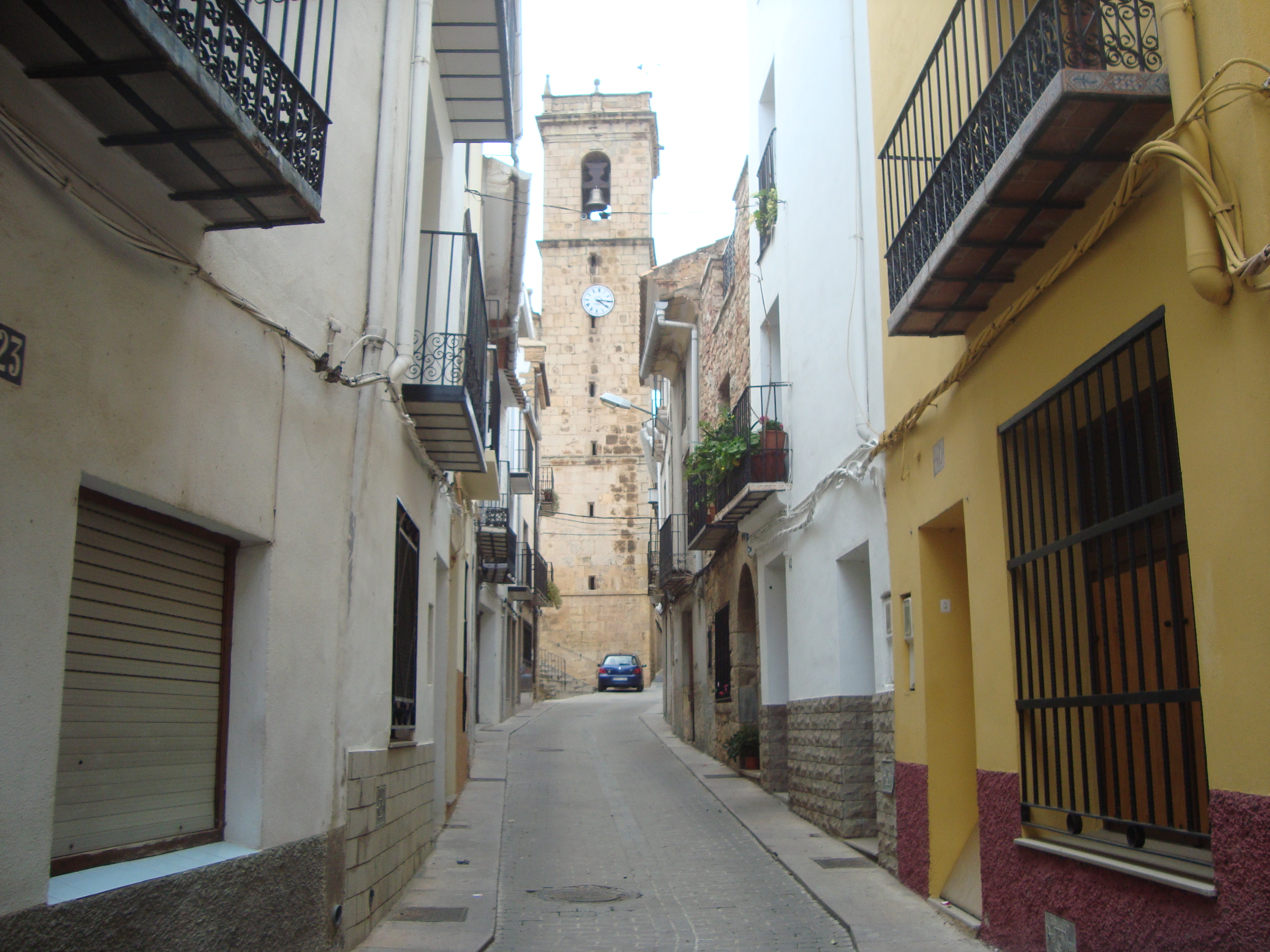
Street in Les Useres

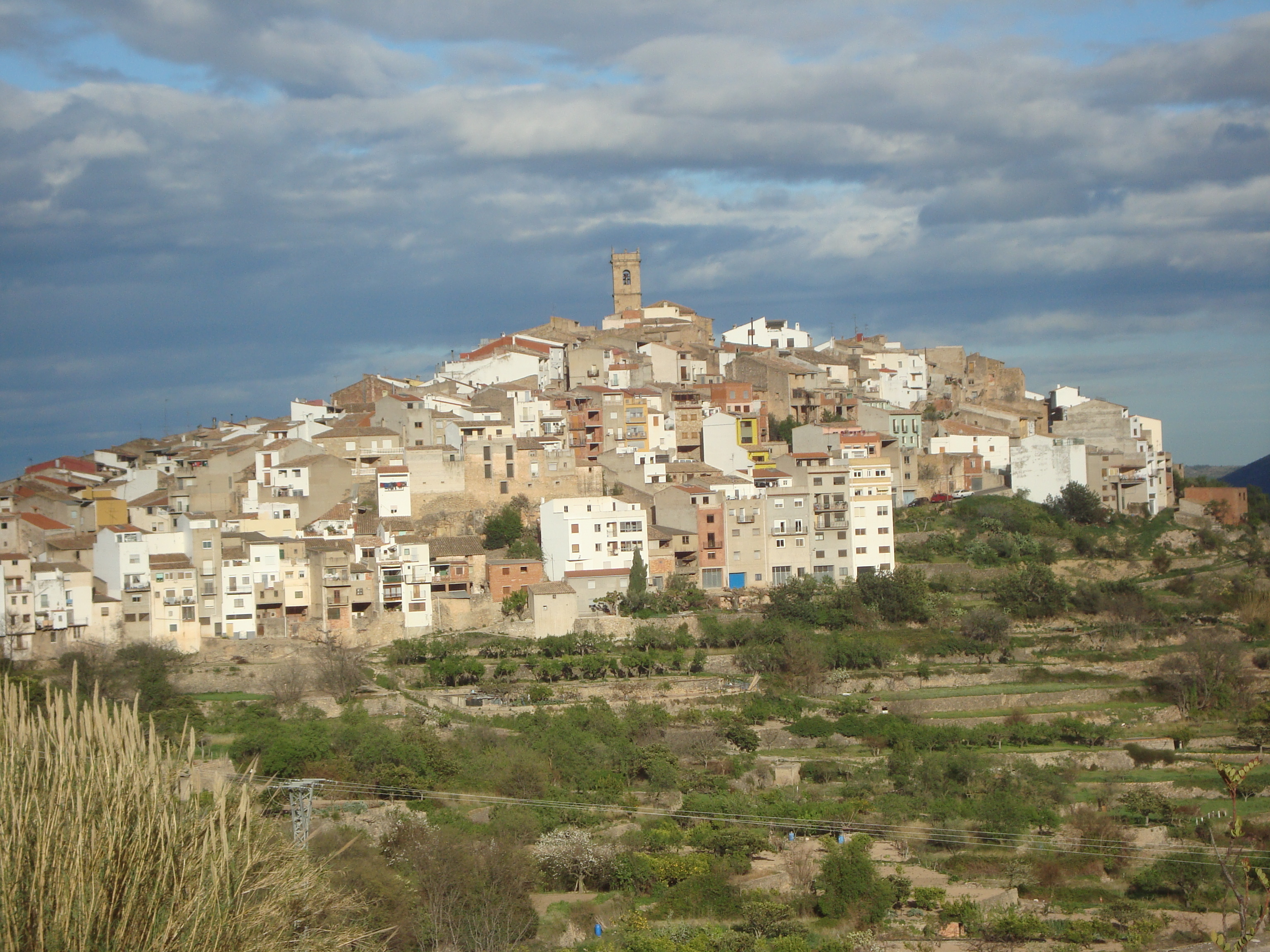
Panoramic view of Les Useres

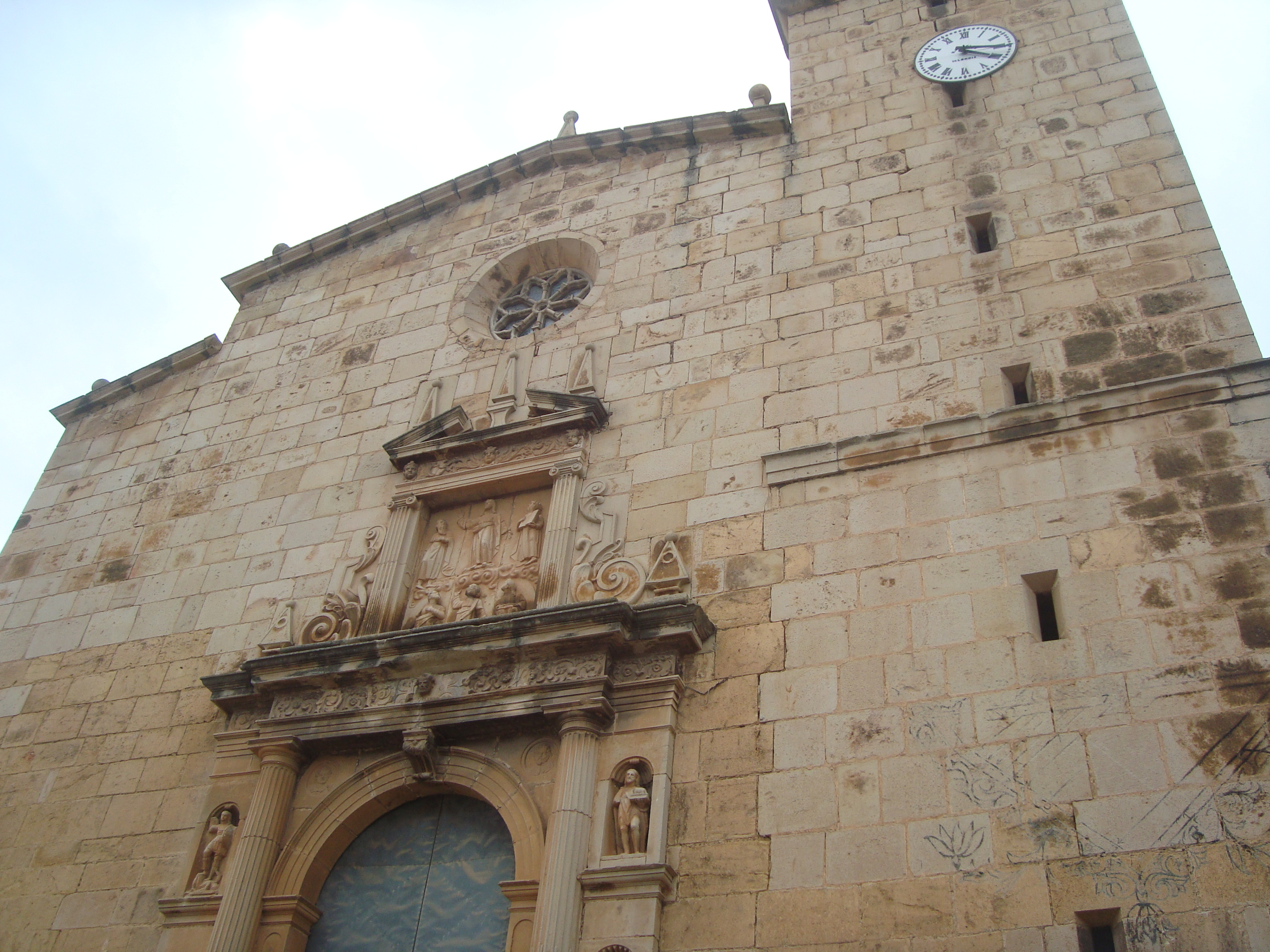
Facade of the Església parroquial in Les Useres

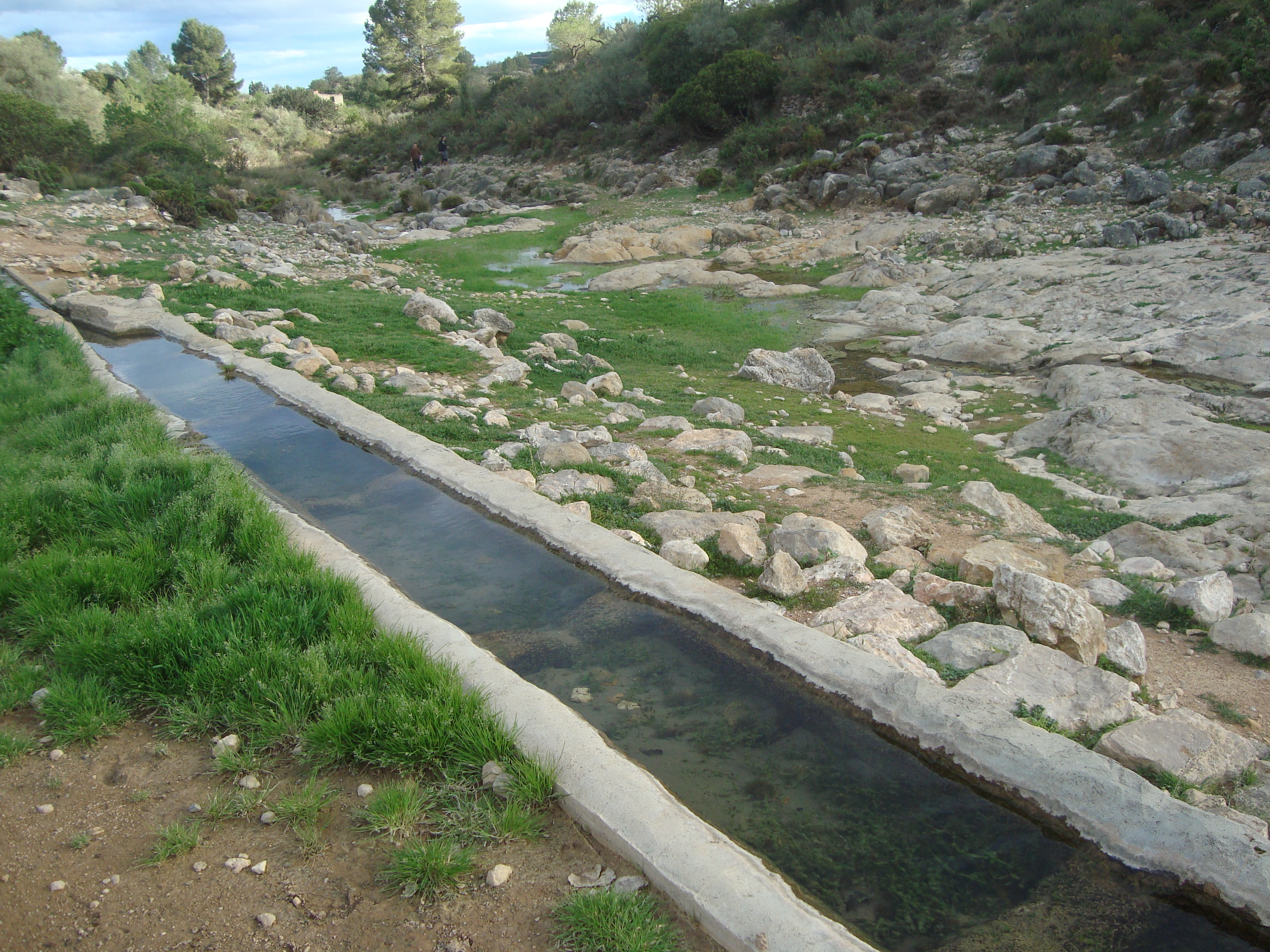
View of la Font de La Presola
