= Ichigensan =

Ichigensan - The Newcomer
- Author: David Zoppetti
- Original title: Ichigensan (いちげんさん)
- Translator: Takuma Sminkey
- Language: Japanese
- Publisher: Shueisha (original) / Ozaru Books (English translation)
- Publication date: December 1996 / November 1999 (Bunko)
- Publication place: Japan
- English publication date: 1 March 2011
- Media type: Print (hardback & paperback)
- Pages: 190 (original) / 215 (Bunko) / 115 (English)
- ISBN: 4087742431 (original) / ISBN 4087471454 (Bunko) / ISBN 978-0-9559219-4-0 (English)

Ichigensan - The Newcomer (いちげんさん, Ichigensan) is Swiss author David Zoppetti's debut novel. Written in Japanese, in 1996 it won the 20th Subaru Prize, awarded to new works by Subaru Novel Magazine (published by Shueisha), and was published by Shueisha that year. It was made into a film in 1999, and an English translation by Okinawan professor Takuma Sminkey was published by Ozaru Books in 2011.

== Plot and themes ==
The main protagonist, 'Boku', is a foreign student in Japan, who wishes to blend in with insular Kyoto society but finds himself rejected as a gaijin (outsider). Frustrated, he volunteers to read books to the blind - partly to assist his own studies of Japanese literature - and finds acceptance with the young, beautiful Kyoko. She soon tests his mettle by choosing erotic works, and eventually a love affair develops. This is however challenged by cultural misunderstandings and prejudice on both sides.

Similar to Elizabeth Katayama (Elizabeth Kata)'s novel Be Ready with Bells and Drums, which was made into the award-winning film A Patch of Blue, the story deals with themes of how perceived handicaps and prejudice can counteract each other and resolve feelings of isolation or alienation, specifically in the example of being 'blind to colour'. The setting also resembles The Reader (Der Vorleser) by Bernhard Schlink (made into a 2008 film, as well as Raymond Jean's novella 'La lectrice' (translated as 'Reader for Hire' and made into a 1988 film, as all cover the little-known area of reading to the visually impaired.

== Reception ==
The Japan Times called Ichigensan "a beautiful love story". Asahi Evening News described it as "Sophisticated [...] subtle [...] sensuous [...] delicate [...] memorable [...] vivid depictions", while Japan PEN Club called it "Striking […] fascinating" and Kyoto Shimbun expressed the style as "Refined and sensual". The New York Times praised the "flawless Japanese" and said the "insights into Japanese relationships are unnervingly perceptive, [the] story as elegantly simple as a haiku".

== Film ==
The film version, directed by Isao Morimoto, was made for the first Kyoto Cinemascena festival and shown at the 1999 Mill Valley Film Festival, with a Japanese roadshow in January 2000.

=== Cast ===
- Edward Atterton (Boku)
- Honami Suzuki (Nakamura Kyoko)
- Nakada Yoshiko (Nakamura Yuriko)
- Keizo Kanie (Yakuza boss)
