= Far Harbor (film) =

- VHS cover
- Directed by: John Huddles
- Written by: John Huddles
- Produced by: John Huddles; Gary Huddles; Gigi de Pourtales
- Starring: Edward Atterton; Jennifer Connelly; Dan Futterman; Marcia Gay Harden; Andrew Lauren; George Newbern; Tracee Ellis Ross; Jim True-Frost
- Cinematography: Tami Reiker
- Edited by: Margaret Guinee; Wilt Henderson; Janice Keuhnelian
- Music by: Keola Beamer; Christopher Tyng
- Production company: Castle Hill Productions
- Distributed by: Castle Hill Productions
- Release date: November 22, 1996
- Country: United States
- Language: English

Far Harbor is an American independent drama film written and directed by John Huddles (in his directing debut) and starring Edward Atterton, Jennifer Connelly, Dan Futterman, Marcia Gay Harden, Andrew Lauren, George Newbern, Tracee Ellis Ross and Jim True-Frost. It follows a group of seven young people who spend a weekend in the home of a wealthy yuppie on Long Island. Originally titled Mr. Spielberg's Boat, the title was changed after Steven Spielberg refused permission to use his name. The movie was the screen debut of model-turned-actress Tracee Ellis Ross. The Castle Hill Productions film was premiered on November 22, 1996.

== Cast ==
- Edward Atterton as Frick Lang
- Jennifer Connelly as Ellie Kaminski
- Dan Futterman as Brad Wickers
- Marcia Gay Harden as Arabella Torn
- Andrew Lauren as Trey Brandon
- George Newbern as Jordan Ars
- Tracee Ellis Ross as Kiki Nix
- Jim True-Frost as Ryland Reid
