= Bumper Robinson =

American television and film actor

- Born: Larry Clarence Robinson II
- Other name: Larry Robinson
- Occupation: Actor
- Years active: 1983–present

Larry Clarence "Bumper" Robinson II is an American actor. He is best known for his voice roles as Damas in Jak 3, Bumblebee and Blitzwing in Transformers: Animated, Rook Blonko and various other characters in Ben 10: Omniverse, and Falcon in various media.

== Career ==
Robinson's first theatrical break came as the son of O. J. Simpson's character in the 1983 television film Cocaine and Blue Eyes. Years later, he portrayed a young Simpson in The O. J. Simpson Story (1995).

In the 1980s, Robinson played Zammis in Enemy Mine, Clarence in Amen, Jonah Carver in Days of Our Lives and a recurring role as Leon in NBC's Night Court. He has made appearances in The Jeffersons, Gimme a Break!, Hill Street Blues, Matt Houston, Cagney & Lacey, Webster, Punky Brewster, The Facts of Life and Family Matters. He began his voice-over career in The Flintstone Kids as Philo Quartz, followed by work in Scooby-Doo, among others.

Robinson's career continued into the 1990s, with work on Star Trek: Deep Space Nine, the FOX television film Generation X as Mondo, and shows like Hangin' with Mr. Cooper, The Client, Touched by an Angel, The Steve Harvey Show, Sister, Sister and The John Larroquette Show. He earned rave reviews for his performance as Jackie Jackson in ABC's miniseries, The Jacksons: An American Dream, after which he joined the cast of A Different World as Dorian Heywood. He also played Jared Harris in Guys Like Us, Marcus Miller in The WB's Three, a recurring role as Ivan Ennis in Living Single and Marcus Wentworth in UPN's Grown Ups.

In 2001, Robinson starred alongside Phylicia Rashad in the PBS film The Old Settler. Not long after, he starred in an American-Chinese produced action series called Flatland, with Dennis Hopper which was filmed in Shanghai. He joined the cast of Sabrina the Teenage Witch in 2003, after which he headed to New Mexico to star in Death Valley.

He has appeared in CSI: NY, Bones, Jane Doe: Yes I Remember It Well, Roommates, Alcatraz and BET's The Game.

In addition, Robinson is also a prominent voice actor with roles in animated films and television shows such as Scooby-Doo and the Ghoul School, Pinky and the Brain, Futurama, Brother Bear, and Teenage Mutant Ninja Turtles. He also provided the voices of Bumblebee, Blitzwing, Porter C. Powell, and Blackout in Transformers: Animated. From 2012 to 2014, Robinson voiced Rook Blonko in Ben 10: Omniverse.

== Filmography ==
=== Live-action ===
==== Film ====
Year	Title	Role
1985	Enemy Mine	Zammis
1995	White Man's Burden	Martin
2001	Behind Enemy Lines	SCIF Technician
2004	Death Valley	Anthony

==== Television ====
Year	Title	Role	Notes
1983	The Jeffersons	Artis	Episode: "And the Winner Is..."
1983–1984	Hill Street Blues	Jimmy, Kid	2 episodes
1983–1984	Webster	Curtis	3 episodes
1984	Matt Houston	Nathaniel	2 episodes
1984	Gimme a Break!	Boomer	Episode: "Breakdance"
1985	Cagney & Lacey	Kevin Taggart	2 episodes
1985–1986	Night Court	Leon	5 episodes
1986	North and South	Michael	2 episodes
1987	The Facts of Life	Todd	Episode: "Sweet Charity"
1987	Punky Brewster	Donald Sotta	Episode: "Best Friends"
1987	The Spirit	Eubie	Television film
1987–1988	Days of Our Lives	Jonah Carver	11 episodes
1988	Day by Day	Warren	Episode: "Girl Wars"
1990	Molloy	Louis Duncan Jackson	2 episodes
1990–1991	Amen	Clarence Simpson	11 episodes
1990–1992	Family Matters	Daniel Wallace, Kyle	4 episodes
1992	The Royal Family	Joe Correy	2 episodes
1992	The Jacksons: An American Dream	Jackie Jackson (ages 12–16)	2 episodes
1992–1993	A Different World	Dorian Heywood	23 episodes
1993	The John Larroquette Show	Extortionist	Episode: "Jumping Off the Wagon"
1994	Thea	Cliff Colver	Episode: "Danesha Project"
1994	Saved by the Bell: The New Class	Doug Parker	Episode: "Bayside Story"
1994	Star Trek: Deep Space Nine	Jem'Hadar	Episode: "The Abandoned"
1994–1996	Sister, Sister	Bellboy, Mike, Jesse	3 episodes
1995	The O. J. Simpson Story	Young O. J. Simpson	Television film
1995	Touched by an Angel	Matthew Mackey	Episode: "The Hero"
1995	On Our Own	Nat	2 episodes
1995	The Client	Jimmy Roland	Episode: "Them That Has..."
1995–1997	Living Single	Ivan Ennis	8 episodes
1996	Hangin' with Mr. Cooper	Eddie	Episode: "Increase the Peace"
1996	Generation X	Mondo	Television film
1996	The Steve Harvey Show	Lawrence	Episode: "The Play's Not the Thing"
1997–2003	Sabrina the Teenage Witch	James, Clifford Weaver	11 episodes
1998	Three	Marcus Miller	13 episodes
1998–1999	Guys Like Us	Jared Harris	13 episodes
1999–2000	Grown Ups	Marcus Wentworth	7 episodes
2000	Linc's	Benjamin	Episode: "People Like Us"
2000	Son of the Beach	Prince Vidor	Episode: "Day of the Jackass"
2000	The Parkers	Bradley	Episode: "The Oddest Couple"
2004	Eve	Mark	Episode: "Dateless in Miami"
2005	CSI: NY	Mike Prineman	Episode: "Hush"
2007–2015	The Game	Juvon Glenn	21 episodes
2009	Bones	Micah Strutt	Episode: "The Girl in the Mask"
2009	Roommates	Russell	Episode: "The Trash 'N Treasures"
2012	Alcatraz	Bobby	Episode: "Pilot"
2015–2016	Black-ish	Marcus Montgomery	2 episodes
2020	blackAF	Broadway	4 episodes

=== Voice acting ===
==== Film ====
Year	Title	Role	Notes
2003	Brother Bear	Chipmunks	
2010	Cats & Dogs: The Revenge of Kitty Galore	Cool Cat, Dog Killa, Slim, Cat Spy Analyst	
2012	Justice League: Doom	Victor Stone / Cyborg	Direct-to-video
2014	Scooby-Doo! WrestleMania Mystery	Ruben	Direct-to-video
2018	MFKZ	Espirit, Octavius	English dub
2020	Happy Halloween, Scooby-Doo!	Mike	Direct-to-video
2021	Seal Team	HMMF Animal Handler, Chum	
2023	Lego Marvel Avengers: Code Red	Sam Wilson / Captain America	
2023	Merry Little Batman	Foodcourt Dad, Worried Man	Amazon Prime Video special

==== Television ====
Year	Title	Role	Notes
1986–1988	The Flintstone Kids	Philo Quartz	
1988	Scooby-Doo and the Ghoul School	Jamal Williams	Television film
1995–1996	Teenage Mutant Ninja Turtles	Carter	
1998	The New Batman Adventures	Teen Cop	Episode: "Mean Seasons"
1998	Pinky and the Brain	Tyrone Spellbinder	Episode: "Dangerous Brains"
1998	Godzilla: The Series	Looter #2	Episode: "Hive"
2000	Batman Beyond	Zack	Episode: "Payback"
2000–2004	Static Shock	Derek Barnett / D-Struct, Heavy C / Slipstream, Troy / Chainlink	
2001–2002	What's with Andy?	Danny Pickett	Season 1
2002	What's New, Scooby-Doo?	Cap N' Robbie, Native Bearer	Episode: "Safari, So Goodi!"
2002–2003	Futurama	Dwight Conrad	
2005	Teen Titans	Hot Spot	
2006	The Batman	Man at the Bank	Episode: "Gotham's Ultimate Criminal Mastermind"
2007	All Grown Up!	Buster Carmichael, Ty	Episode: "In the Family's Way"
2007–2008	Legion of Super Heroes	Star Boy, Ontiir	
2007–2009	Transformers: Animated	Bumblebee, Blitzwing, Porter C. Powell, Blackout	
2009–2010	Batman: The Brave and the Bold	Black Lightning	
2010–2012	The Avengers: Earth's Mightiest Heroes	James "Rhodey" Rhodes / War Machine	
2012–2014	Ben 10: Omniverse	Rook Blonko, Bloxx, Terraspin, Ball Weevil, Corvo, Alan Albright, Doc Saturday, additional voices	
2012	Motorcity	Rayon, Duke's Guard	Episode: "Julie and the Amazons"
2013–2019	Avengers Assemble	Falcon, Human Cannonball	
2013	Lego Marvel Super Heroes: Maximum Overload	Falcon, S.H.I.E.L.D. Sentry #1	Television special
2014	Ultimate Spider-Man	Falcon	Episode: "The Avenging Spider-Man"
2014	Mixels	Footi, Glurt, Wizwuz	Episode: "Mixed Up Special"
2015–2020	Curious George	Mr. Berg, Dan	
2015	Lego Marvel Super Heroes: Avengers Reassembled	Falcon	Television special
2017	Lost In Oz	Smith, Tinker, Fauxquat	
2017	Marvel Future Avengers	Falcon	English dub
2018	Voltron: Legendary Defender	Ryan Kinkade	
2020	T.O.T.S.	Sam, Turtle	Episode: "The Ring Bear/Bull of Energy"
2020–2022	The Owl House	Hieronymus Bump	
2021	Record of Ragnarok	Michelangelo, Poseidon, Additional Cast	English dub
2021	Baki Hanma	Iron Michael	English dub
2021–2023	Teenage Euthanasia	Ralph Sr., Hologram Doug, Barry	
2021–2023	Harriet the Spy	Mr. Gibbs, Mr. Horatio, Ray Withers	
2022	American Dad!	Fireman	Episode: "A Song of Knives and Fire"
2023–2025	Moon Girl and Devil Dinosaur	Redwing, additional voices	Episode: "The Devil You Know"
2024	Batman: Caped Crusader	Lucius Fox, additional voices	
2024	Kite Man: Hell Yeah!	Clerk	Episode: "Just Right, Hell Yeah!"
2024	Max & the Midknights	Guard Dennis, Purple Guard	
2024	Interior Chinatown	Black & White VO	Miniseries
2024–present	Spidey and His Amazing Friends	Lizard, Pedestrian	
2025	Harley Quinn	Grad Student #2	Episode: "Floronic Man"

==== Video games ====
Year	Title	Role	Notes
2003	Command & Conquer: Generals	Additional voices	
2004	EverQuest II	Additional voices	Also Desert of Flames
2004	Jak 3	Damas	
2005	Teen Titans	Hot Spot	
2007	Armored Core 4	Sus	
2008	Transformers Animated: The Game	Bumblebee, Blitzwing	
2008	Aion: Upheaval	Additional voices	
2009	X-Men Origins: Wolverine	Bolivar Trask	
2009	G.I. Joe: The Rise of Cobra	Tunnel Rat	
2009	James Cameron's Avatar: The Game	Batista, RDA	
2010	Metal Gear Solid: Peace Walker	Soldiers	
2010	Crackdown 2	Additional voices	
2010	Batman: The Brave and the Bold – The Videogame	Black Lightning	
2011	Marvel Super Hero Squad Online	War Machine	
2011	Resistance 3	Ellis Turner	
2011	Ace Combat: Assault Horizon	Warwolf 4	
2011	Kinect: Disneyland Adventures	Additional voices	
2011	Star Wars: The Old Republic	Various voices	
2012	Resistance: Burning Skies	Fireman Lawson, Civilians, Minuteman	
2012	Guild Wars 2	Ryland Steelcatcher, additional voices	
2012	Ben 10: Omniverse	Rook Blonko, Bloxx	
2012–2015	Skylanders series	Bouncer	
2013	Marvel Heroes	Falcon	Uncredited
2013	Batman: Arkham Origins	S.W.A.T. Officers	
2013	Ben 10: Omniverse 2	Rook Blonko, Bloxx	
2014	Disney Infinity: Marvel Super Heroes	Falcon	
2014	Lego Batman 3: Beyond Gotham	Cyborg	
2015	Infinite Crisis	Cyborg	
2015	Disney Infinity 3.0	Falcon	
2015	Lego Dimensions	Cyborg, Zane	
2015	Fallout 4	Additional voices	
2016	Doom	UAC Spokesperson	
2016	Lego Star Wars: The Force Awakens	Additional voices	
2018	Star Trek Online	Dukan'Rex	Victory is Life
2018	Spider-Man	Additional voices	
2018	Lego DC Super-Villains	Cyborg, Grid	
2018	Fallout 76	Officer Sidney	Wild Appalachia DLC
2019	Rage 2	Mo Rummy, Dreadwood Civilians	
2019	Marvel Ultimate Alliance 3: The Black Order	Falcon	
2019	Need for Speed Heat	Voice Talent	
2020	The Walking Dead: Saints & Sinners	The Tourist (Male)	
2020	Final Fantasy VII Remake	Additional voices	
2020	Avengers	Additional voices	
2022	Saints Row	Character Voices, Law Enforcement	
2022	The Walking Dead: Saints & Sinners – Chapter 2: Retribution	The Tourist (Male)	
2023	Redfall	Dr. Terrance	
2023	Star Trek: Resurgence	Calloway	
2023	Starfield	Vladimir Sall	
2023	Hi-Fi Rush	Announcer, Hype Man, SBR-001 #2	
2023	Hellboy Web of Wyrd	Benson, Deneveux	
2024	Suicide Squad: Kill the Justice League	Floyd Lawton / Deadshot	
2024	Final Fantasy VII Rebirth	Additional voices	
2024	The Elder Scrolls Online	Additional voices	Gold Road DLC
2025	Dune: Awakening	Traj Axxari	

==== Theme parks ====
Year	Attraction	Role	Park
2015	Justice League: Battle for Metropolis	Cyborg	Six Flags Great Adventure; Six Flags Great America; Six Flags Magic Mountain; Six Flags Mexico; Six Flags Over Georgia; Six Flags Over Texas; Six Flags St. Louis
2019	Cyborg: Hyper Drive	Cyborg, Grid	Six Flags New England

Preceded by Mark Ryan	Voice of Bumblebee; 2007–2010	Succeeded by Mark Ryan
Preceded by Ed Gilbert	Voice of Blitzwing; 2007–2009	Succeeded by incumbent
