= Costur =

- Municipality
- Coat of arms

- Location in Spain
- Coordinates: 40°7′N 0°10′W
- Country: Spain
- Community: Valencian Community
- Province: Castellón
- Comarca: Alcalatén

Government
  - Mayor: Luis Gregori Herrando

Area
  - Total: 21.9 km^{2} (8.5 sq mi)
- Elevation: 465 m (1,526 ft)

Population (2025-01-01)
  - Total: 511
  - Density: 23.3/km^{2} (60.4/sq mi)
- Demonym: Costureros
- Postal code: 12119

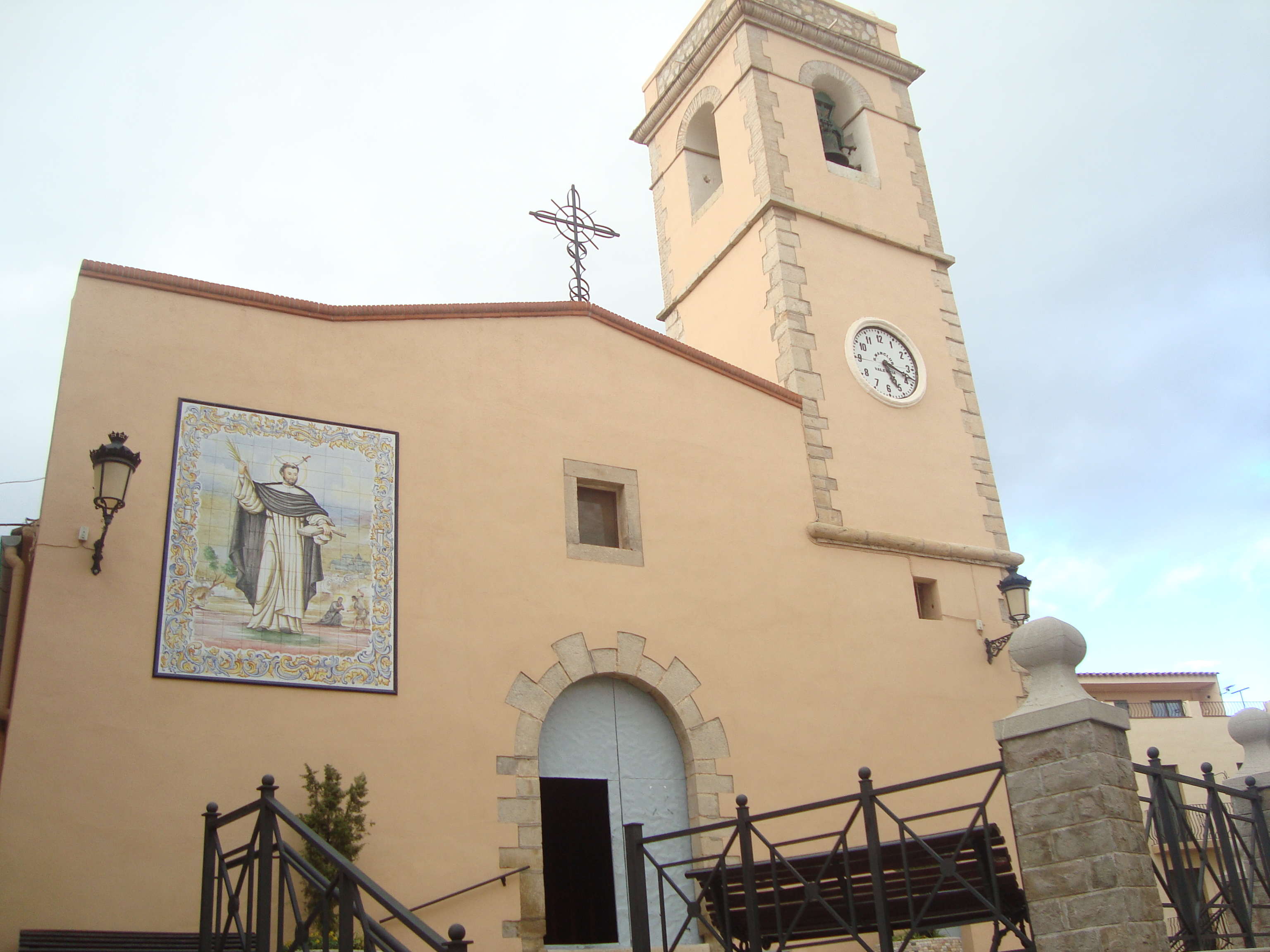
Iglesia parroquial de San Pedro Mártir de Costur (Castellón)

Costur is a municipality in the comarca of Alcalatén, Castellón, Valencia, Spain.

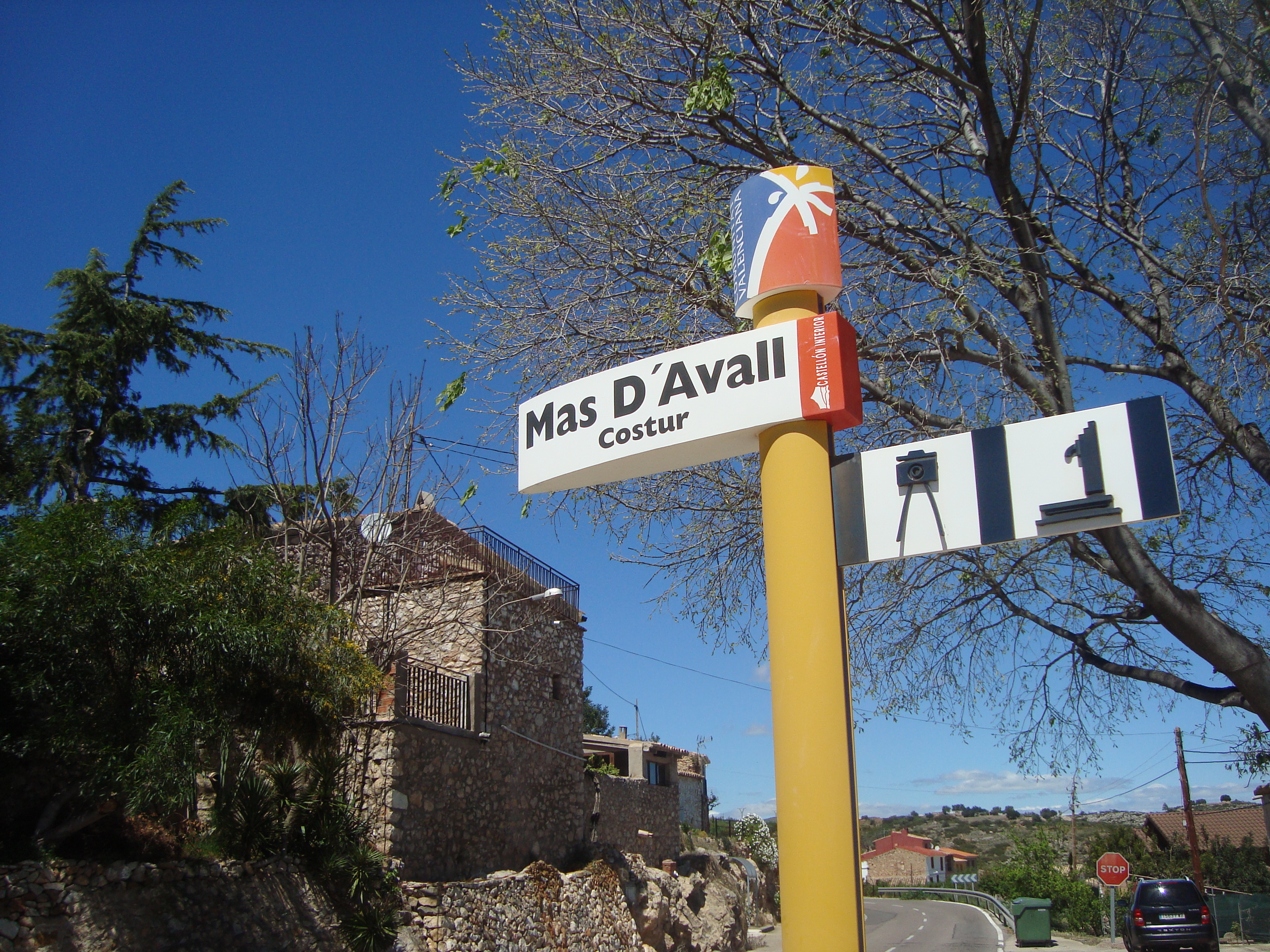
Mas D'Avall (Costur)

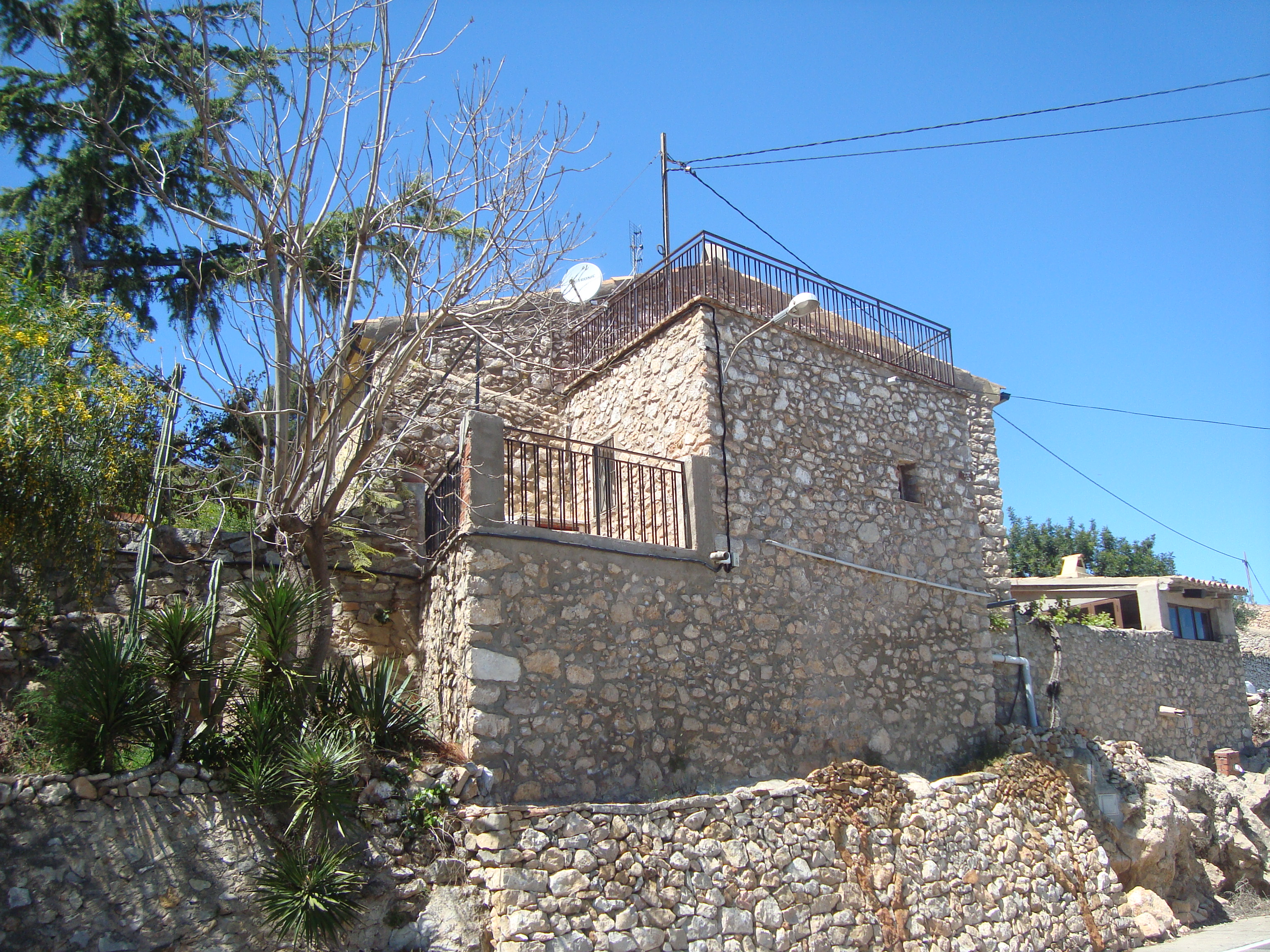
Casa de Mas D'Avall (Costur)

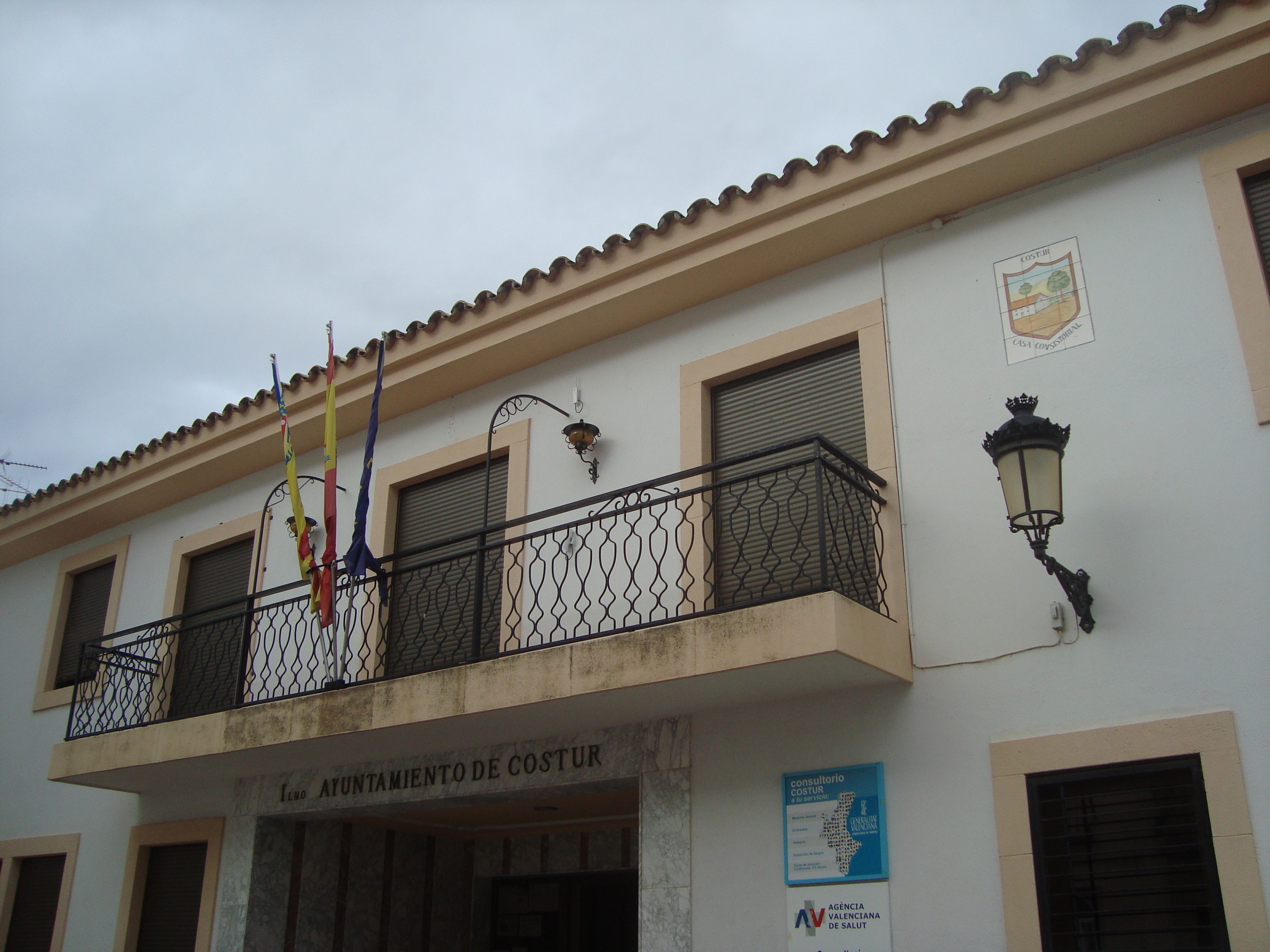
Ayuntamiento de Costur, comarca Alcalatén (Castellón)

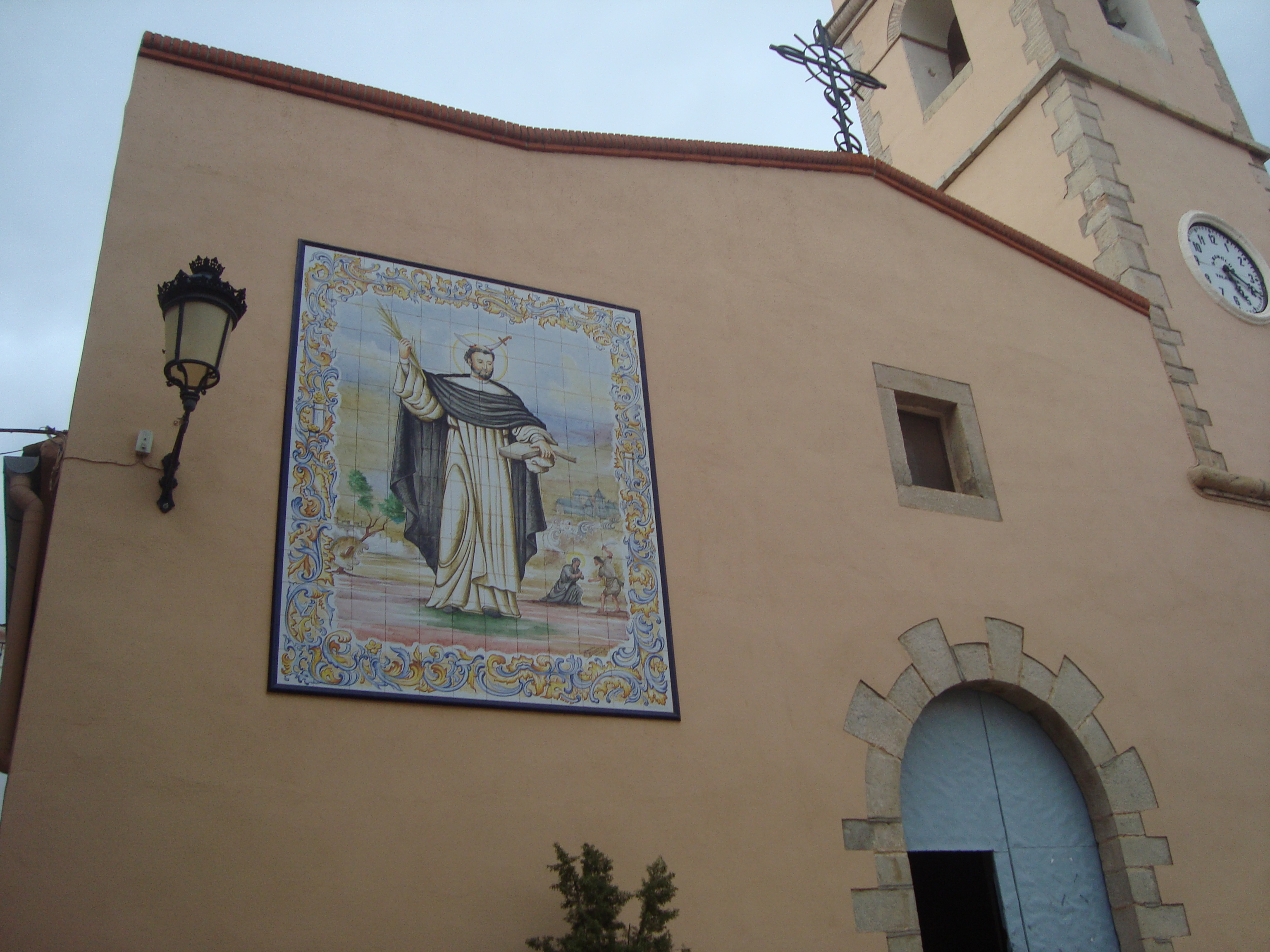
Mural cerámico de la Iglesia Parroquial de San Pedro Mártir de Costur (Castellón)

== See also ==
- List of municipalities in Castellón
