= Figueroles =

- Municipality
- Coat of arms

- Location in Spain
- Coordinates: 40°7′N 0°14′W
- Country: Spain
- Community: Valencian Community
- Province: Castellón
- Comarca: Alcalatén

Government
  - Mayor: Luis Gregori Herrando

Area
  - Total: 12.1 km^{2} (4.7 sq mi)
- Elevation: 360 m (1,180 ft)

Population (2025-01-01)
  - Total: 525
  - Density: 43.4/km^{2} (112/sq mi)
- Demonym: Figuerolers
- Postal code: 12122

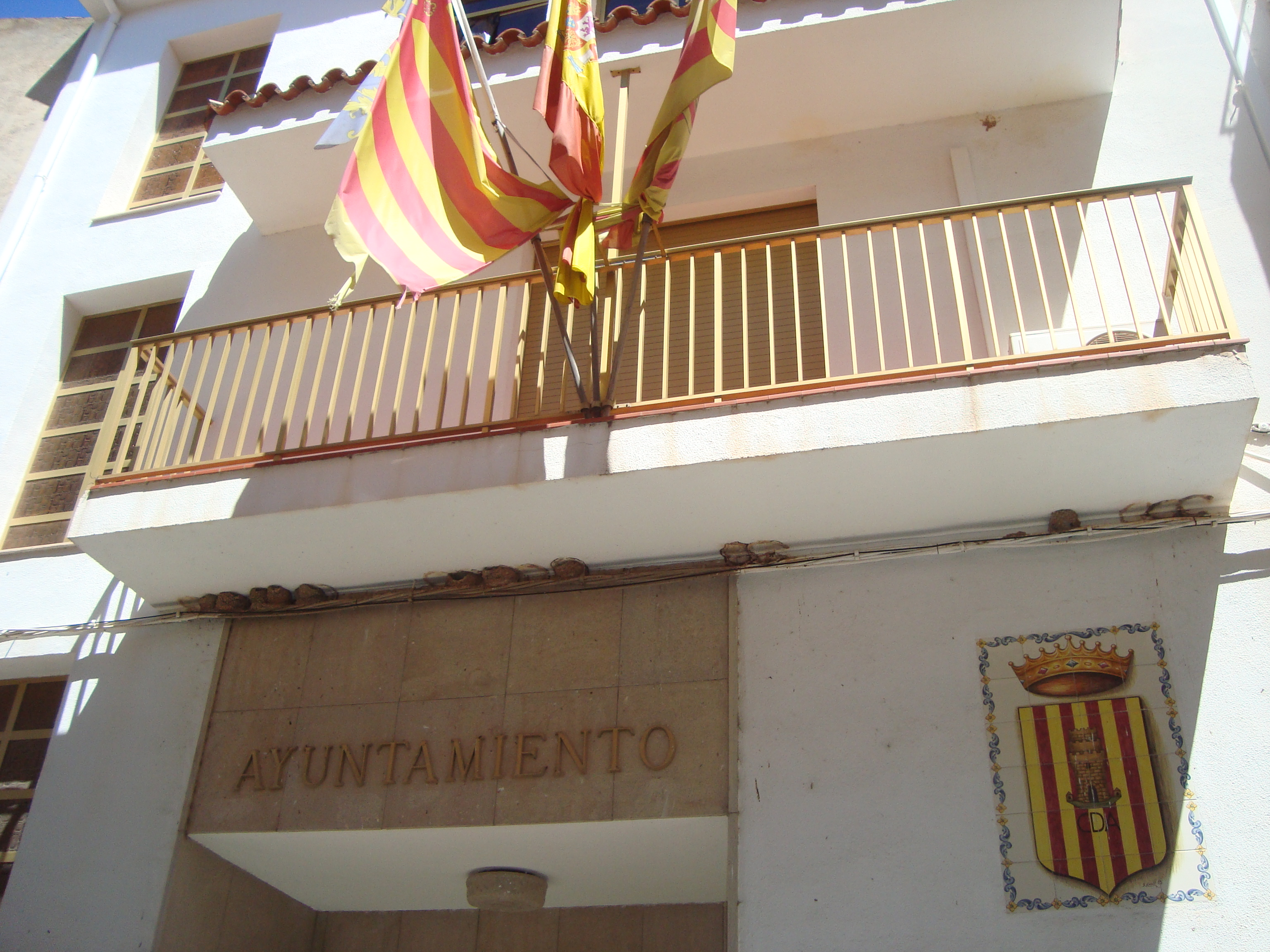
Ayuntamiento de Figueroles (Castellón)

Figueroles is a municipality in the comarca of Alcalatén, province of Castellón, Valencian Community, Spain.

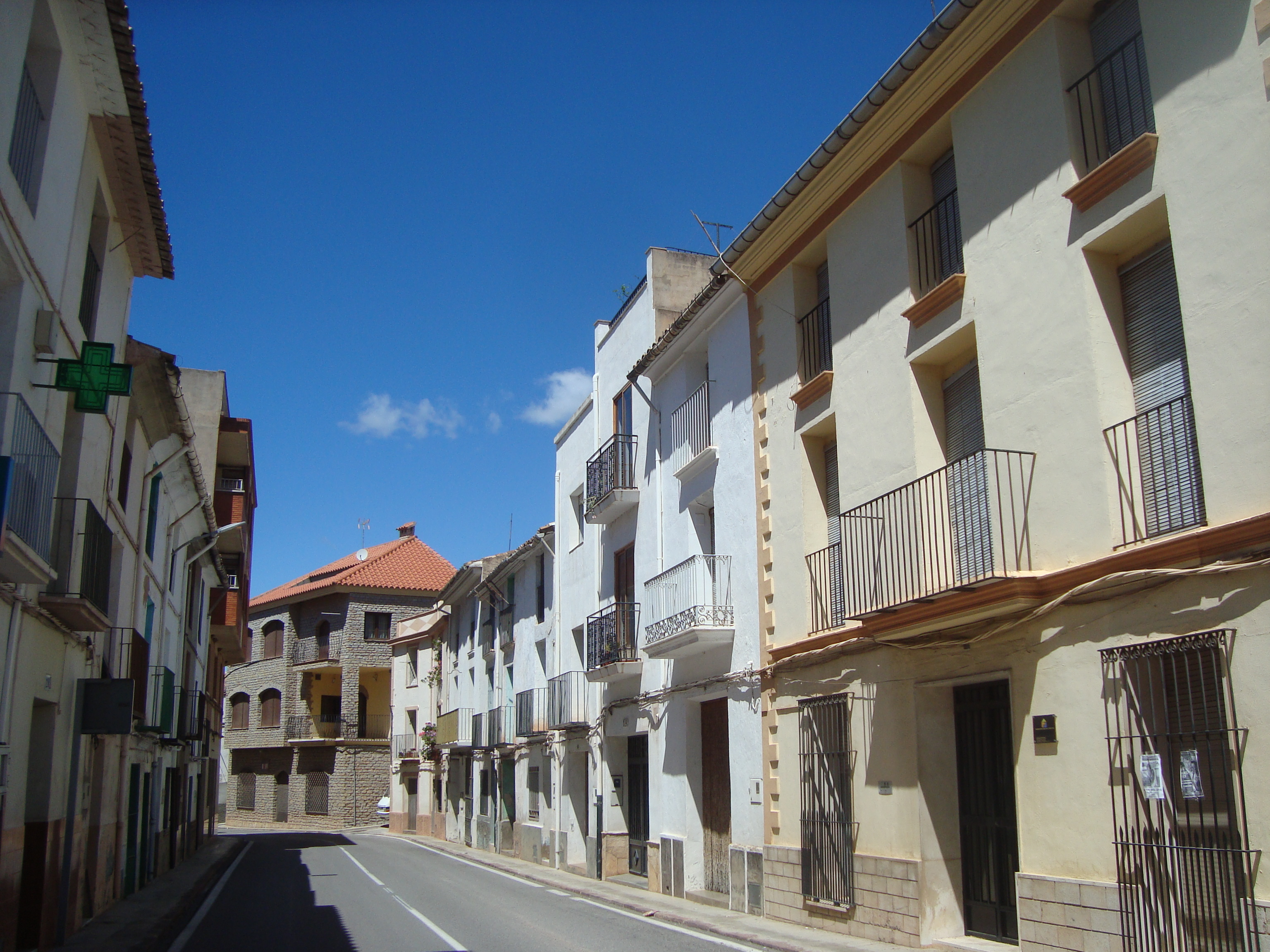
Perfil urbano (Figueroles)

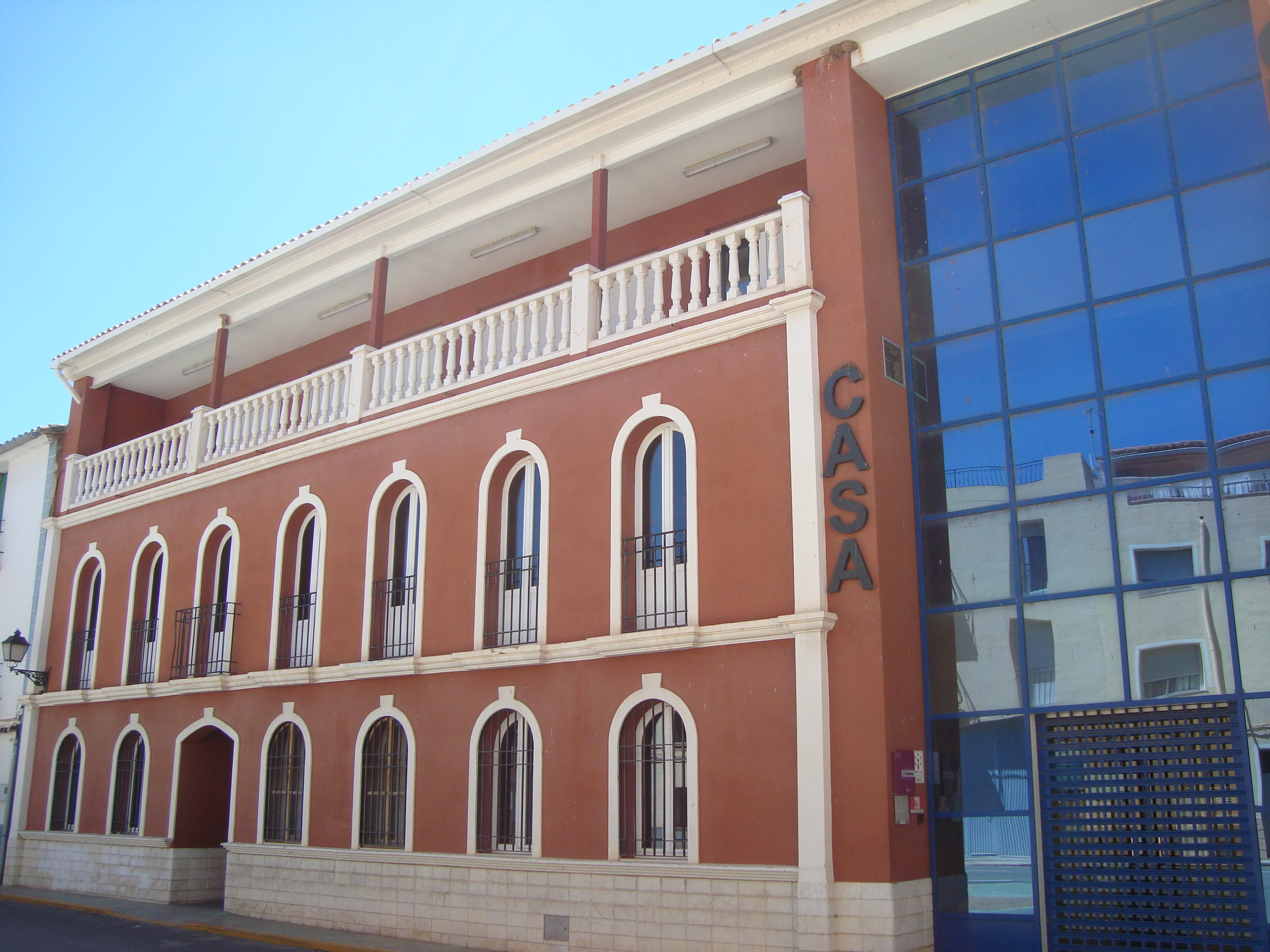
Casa de la Cultura (Figueroles)

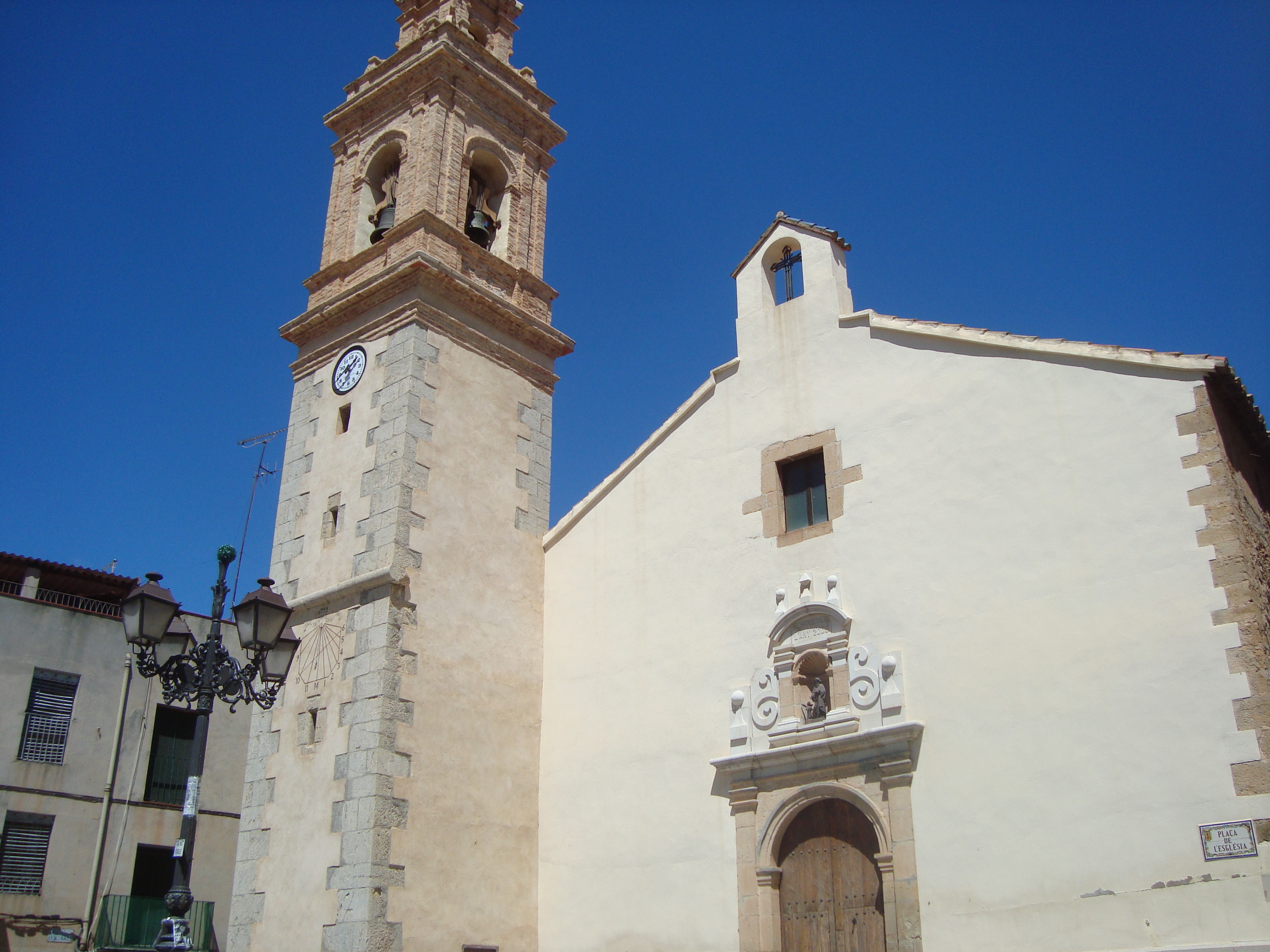
Església parroquial de Sant Mateu (Figueroles, Castelló)

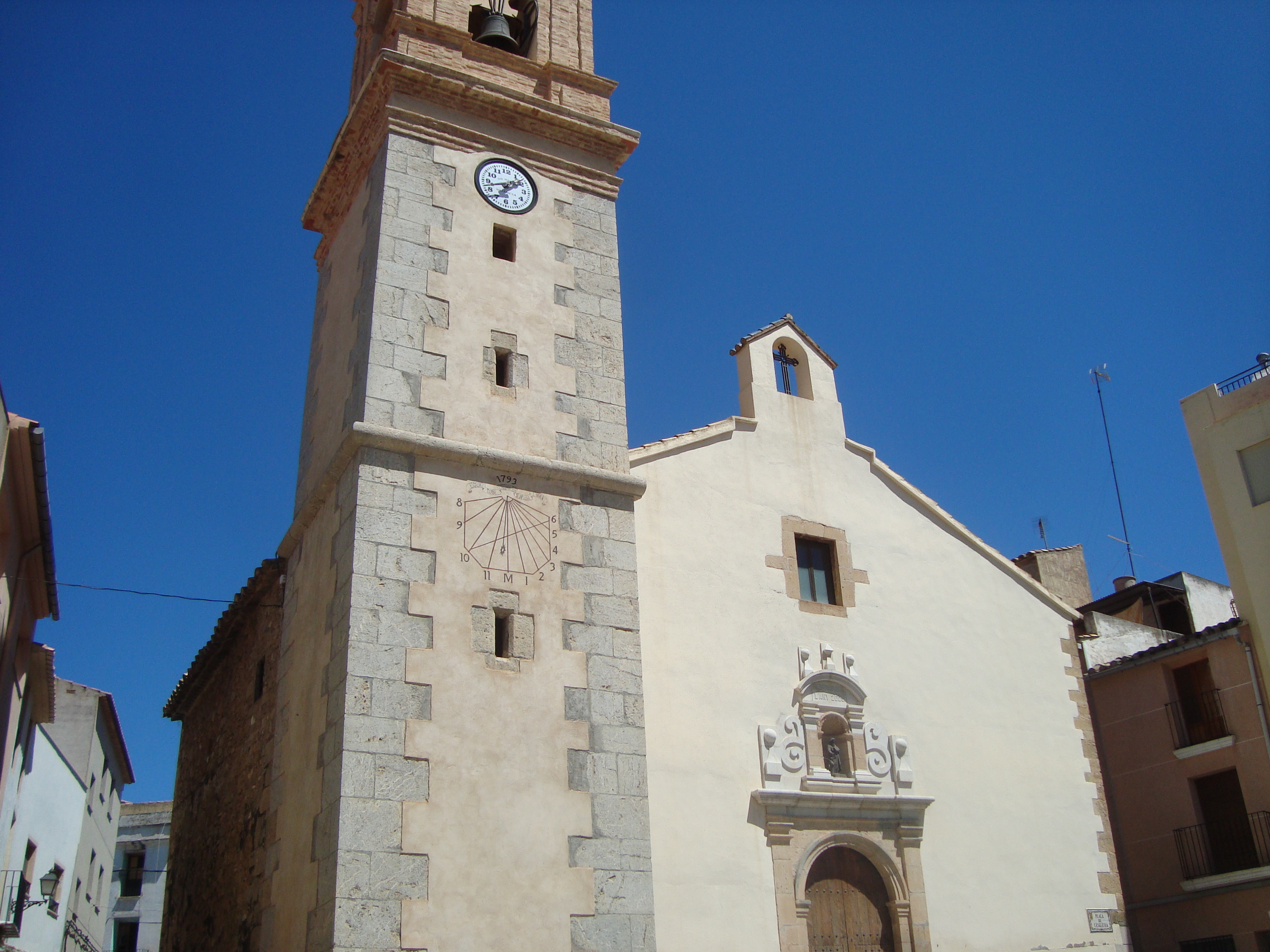
Església parroquial de Sant Mateu (Figueroles)
