= Alcalatén =

Coordinates: 40°08′19″N 0°16′48″W

- Comarca
- Country: Spain
- Autonomous community: Valencian Community
- Province: Castellón / Castelló
- Capital and largest city: L'Alcora
- Municipalities: 6 municipalities: Chodos / Xodos, Costur, Figueroles, Les Useres, L'Alcora, Lucena del Cid / Llucena

Area
  - Total: 405 km^{2} (156 sq mi)

Population (2019)
  - Total: 15,585
  - Density: 38.5/km^{2} (99.7/sq mi)
- Time zone: UTC+1 (CET)
  - Summer (DST): UTC+2 (CEST)

Alcalatén (Valencian: [alkalaˈten]; Spanish: [alkalaˈten]) is a comarca in the province of Castellon, Valencian Community, Spain.

== Municipalities ==
The comarca is composed of nine municipalities, listed below with their populations according to the most recent official estimates (as at 1 January 2019):

Name	Population (2019)	Area (km²)	Elevation (AMSL)
Atzeneta del Maestrat	1,276	71.2	402 m (1,319 ft)
Benafigos	142	35.6	945 m (3,100 ft)
Chodos / Xodos	112	44.3	1,063 m (3,488 ft)
Costur	524	21.9	465 m (1,526 ft)
Figueroles	523	12.1	360 m (1,180 ft)
Les Useres	962	80.7	401 m (1,316 ft)
L'Alcora	10,405	94.90	279 m (915 ft)
Lucena del Cid (Llucena)	1,302	137	568 m (1,864 ft)
Vistabella del Maestrat	339	151	1,246 m (4,088 ft)
Totals	15,585	648.7	636 m (2,088 ft)

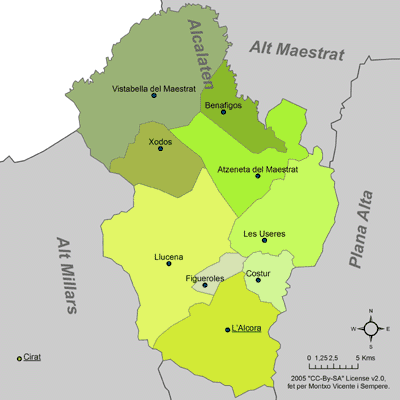
Municipalities of Alcalatén (until 2022)
