= Xodos / Chodos =

Xodos/Chodos Xodos
- Municipality
- Xodos/Chodos
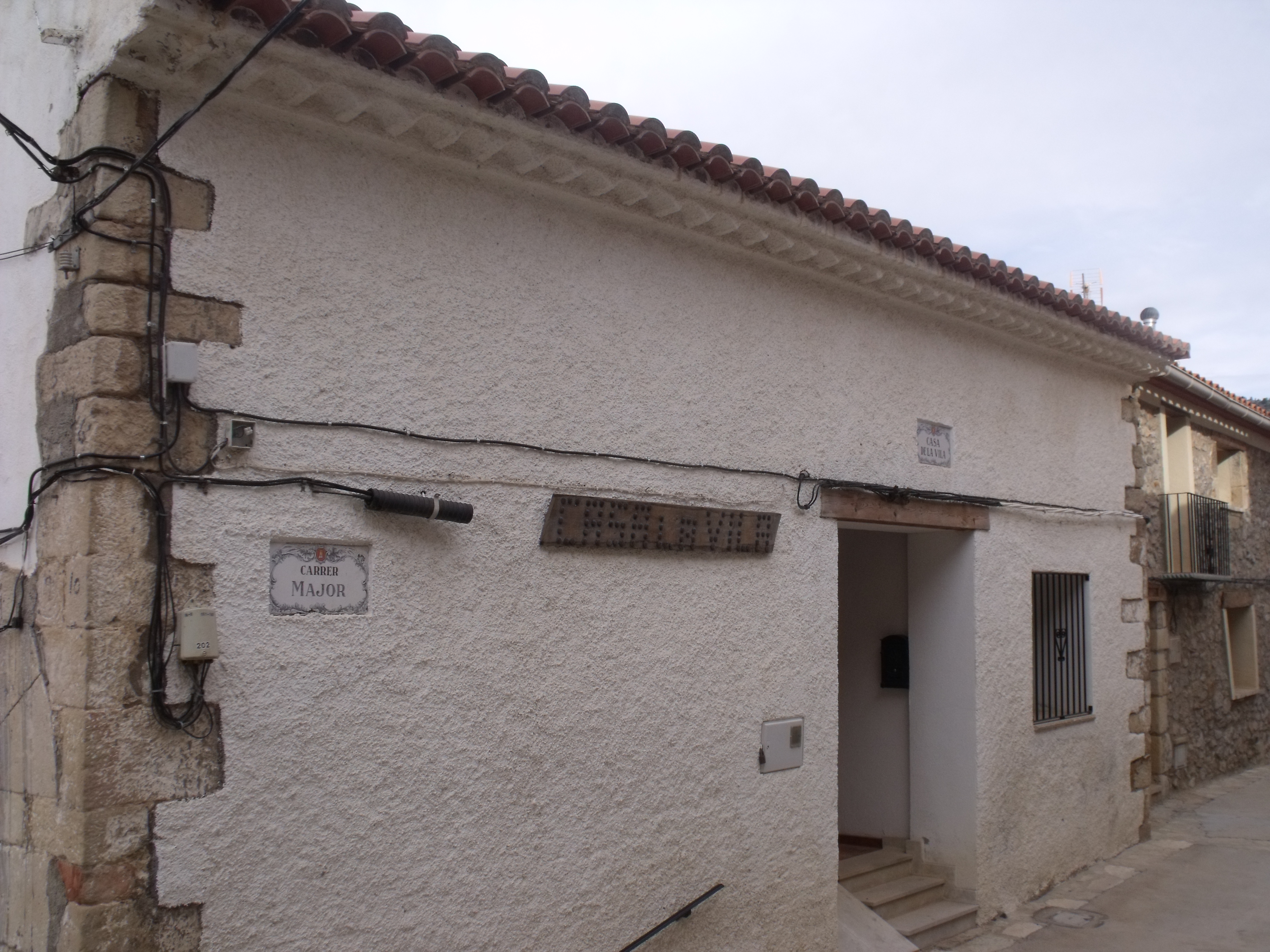
- Town hall

- Flag Coat of arms

- Location in Spain
- Coordinates: 40°14′44″N 0°17′16″W
- Country: Spain
- Autonomous community: Valencian Community
- Province: Castellón
- Comarca: Alcalatén
- Judicial district: Castellón de la Plana

Government
  - Mayor: Juan Gasch Aparici

Area
  - Total: 44.3 km^{2} (17.1 sq mi)
- Elevation: 1,063 m (3,488 ft)

Population (2025-01-01)
  - Total: 107
  - Density: 2.42/km^{2} (6.26/sq mi)
- Demonym(s): Chodanos/as (Spanish), Xodencs/es (Valencian)
- Time zone: UTC+1 (CET)
  - Summer (DST): UTC+2 (CEST)
- Postal code: 12134
- Official language(s): Valencian and Spanish
- Website: http://www.xodos.es/

Xodos/Chodos (Valencian: Xodos) (Spanish: Chodos) is a municipality in the comarca of l'Alcalatén in the Valencian Country.

== See also ==
- List of municipalities in Castellón
