= Three (TV series) =

1998 American television series

- Genre: Adventure drama
- Created by: Evan Katz
- Starring: Edward Atterton; Julie Bowen; Bumper Robinson; David Warner; Doug Abrahams
- Composer: Greg De Belles
- Country of origin: United States
- Original language: English
- No. of seasons: 1
- No. of episodes: 13 (5 unaired)

Production
- Executive producers: Evan Katz; Brooke Kennedy; Charles S. Carroll; Tracey Stern; Thom Polizzi
- Running time: 60 minutes
- Production companies: MTV Productions; Paramount Television

Original release
- Network: The WB
- Release: February 2 – March 23, 1998

Three is an American adventure drama television series created by Evan Katz, that aired on The WB from February 2 to March 23, 1998. The series was produced by MTV Productions and Paramount Television.

== Plot ==
The plot of the show was centered on three thieves, who all participated in crimes that brought no legitimate suffering to others. They were captured by a secret agency that forced them to use their abilities on the agency's behalf to combat criminals who were a threat against the American way of life, under threat of going to prison themselves.

== Cast ==
- Edward Atterton as Johnathan Vance
- Julie Bowen as Amanda Webb
- Bumper Robinson as Marcus Miller
- David Warner as 'The Man'

== Episodes ==
No.	Title	Directed by	Written by	Original release date
1	"You Are Cordially Required"	Michael Katleman	Evan Katz	February 2, 1998
2	"Hope"	Lee Bonner	Tracey Stern	February 9, 1998
3	"Blink of an Eye"	Allen Coulter	Teleplay by Tracey Stern Story by Clifton Campbell	February 16, 1998
4	"Like Felon, Like Daughter"	Robert Ginty	Tom Ropelewski	February 23, 1998
5	"Avatar"	Oscar Costo	Scott Smith	March 2, 1998
6	"The Item"	Oscar Costo	Teleplay by Tom Ropelewski and Scott Smith Story by Tracey Stern	March 9, 1998
7	"Buyer Beware"	John Kretchmer	Scott Smith	March 16, 1998
8	"The Games"	John McPherson	Tracey Stern	March 23, 1998
9	"You Must Remember This"	Michael Katleman	Wendy West	Unaired
10	"Now You See It"	Jorge Montesi	Scott Smith	Unaired
11	"Break Out"	Winrich Kolbe	Javier Grillo-Marxuach	Unaired
12	"Emerald City"	Jorge Montesi	Javier Grillo-Marxuach	Unaired
13	"Uncontrolled Urge"	Lee Bonner	Tom Ropelewski, Tracey Stern, Javier Grillo-Marxuach and Wendy West	Unaired

== See also ==
- It Takes a Thief
