= David Zoppetti =

Swiss-born author (born 1962)

- Born: 26 February 1962 (age 64); Switzerland
- Occupation: Novelist

David Zoppetti (デビット・ゾペティ, Debitto Zopeti; born 26 February 1962) is a Swiss-born author, best known for his novel Ichigensan. Writing exclusively in Japanese, Zoppetti is thus an exophonic writer, considered part of the J-Literature movement. (J-Literature refers to Japanese literature of the 1990s, particularly novels on street life in urban Japan.)

After leaving the Japanese language faculty of Geneva University, Zoppetti came to Japan and attended Doshisha University's department of Japanese literature, which he graduated in 1990. On graduation he became TV Asahi's first non-Japanese employee, and also their first employee to claim paternity leave. Soon after being hired, on 5 April 1991 he appeared in the opening scene of Kensaku Morita's 'Netsuketsu Television' show, and he went on to be a reporter and director for the flagship news programme News Station.

His first novel, Ichigensan won the 20th Subaru Prize for Literature in 1996, and was further nominated for the 116th Akutagawa Prize. It also attracted critical attention as a work to "cross borders and break with established literary tradition [...] unique in that it is a novel of Kyoto written in Japanese by an 'outsider' for a Japanese audience". This success led him to leave TV Asahi in 1998 and concentrate on his writing activities, although he continued to work in a number of side-ventures including the promotion of Swiss goods such as absinthe and reflexology. Ichigensan "was a best-seller among young women readers [and went on to be] made into a hit film in 1999".

His second novel, Alegrias was nominated for the 13th Mishima Yukio Prize, and his third book - a non-fiction travelogue - won the 50th Japan Essayists Club Prize in 2001.

Zoppetti refers to his own race as 'thoroughly mixed' (純粋な混血), having Italian, American, Ukrainian, Iraqi and Polish great-grandparents, and speaking German, French, Italian, English and Japanese.

== Works ==
- いちげんさん (Ichigensan) (1997, Shueisha)
  - English translation by Takuma Sminkey published as 'Ichigensan - The Newcomer' (2011, Ozaru Books)
- アレグリア (Alegrias) (2000, Shueisha)
- 旅日記 A Travel Diary, Un Journal de Voyage (Tabi Nikki) (2001, Shueisha)
- 命の風 (Inochi no Kaze = The Winds of Life) (2005, Gentosha)
- 不法愛妻家 (Fuhō Aisaika = An Illegal Husband in Love) (2012, Shinchosha)
- 旅立ちの季節 (Tabidachi no Kisetsu = The Season of Departures) (2016, Kodansha)

== See also ==
- Hideo Levy
- C. W. Nicol
