= L'Alcora =

- Municipality
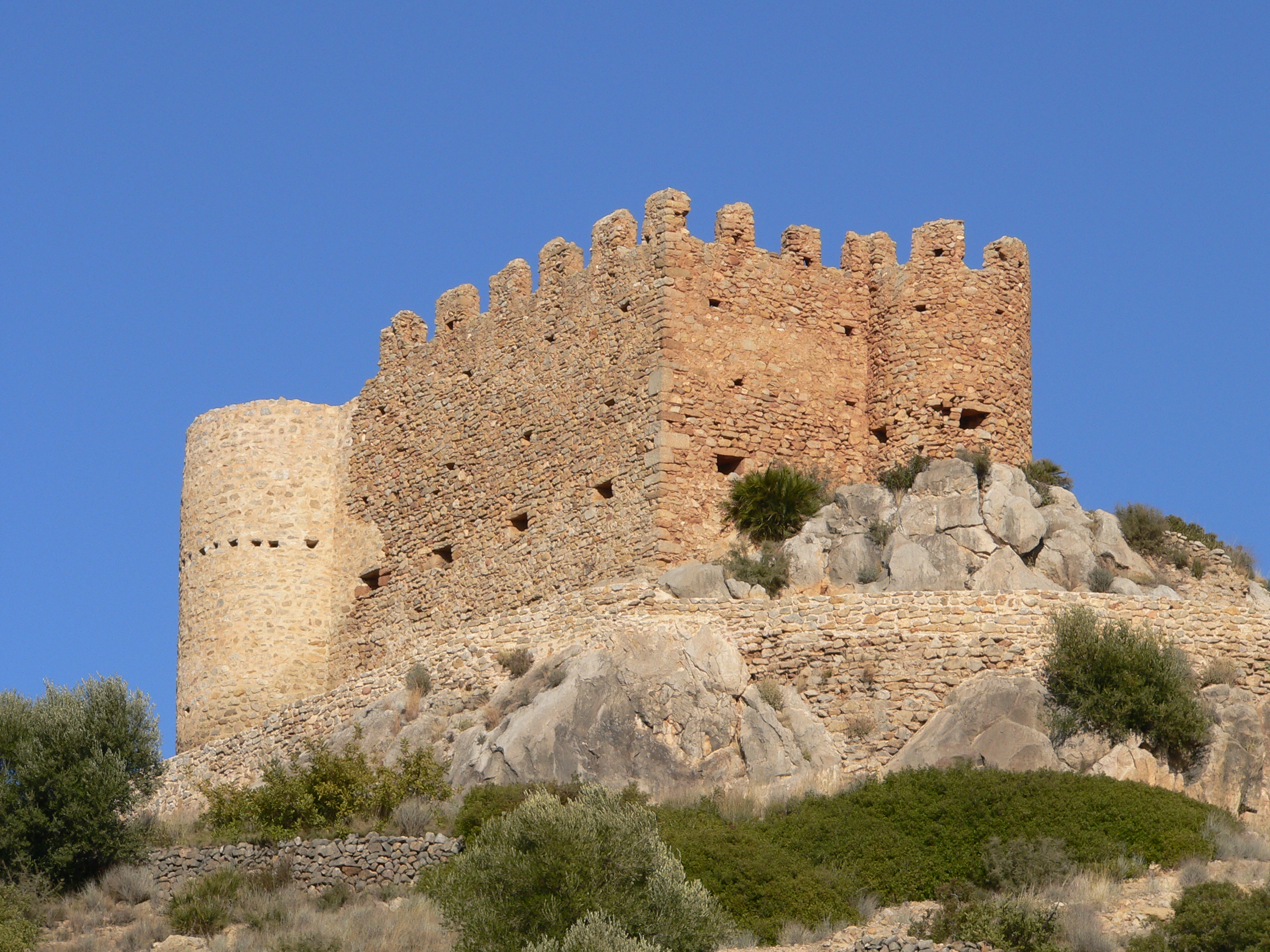
- Castle of Alcalatén

- Flag Coat of arms

- Location in Spain
- Coordinates: 40°4′N 0°12′W
- Country: Spain
- Community: Valencian Community
- Province: Castellón
- Comarca: Alcalatén

Government
  - Mayor: Manuel J. Peris Salvador

Area
  - Total: 94.90 km^{2} (36.64 sq mi)
- Elevation: 279 m (915 ft)

Population (2025-01-01)
  - Total: 10,664
  - Density: 112.4/km^{2} (291.0/sq mi)
- Demonym: Alcorinos
- Postal code: 12110
- Website: Official website

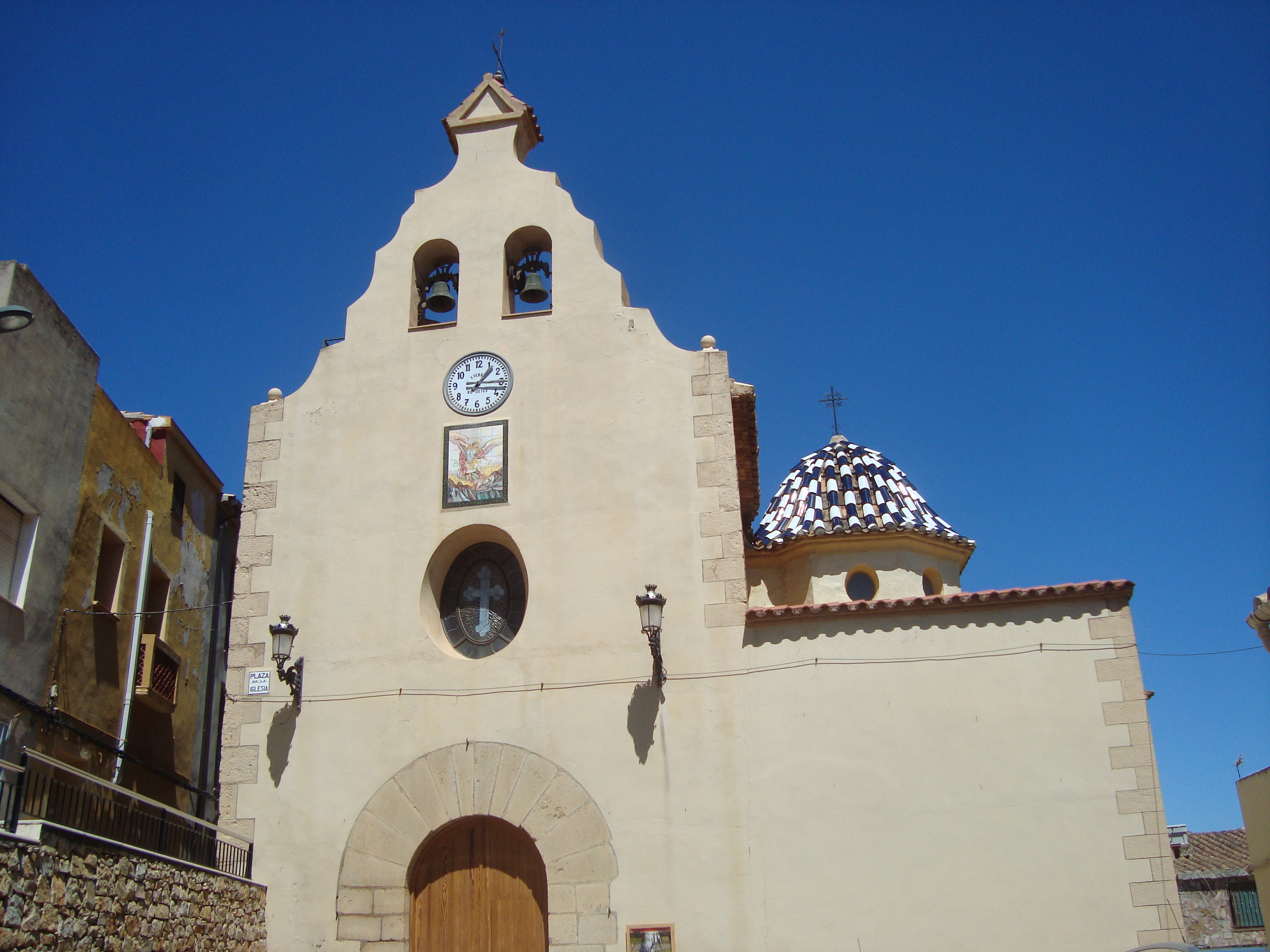
Església de Sant Miquel (La Foia, l'Alcora)

L'Alcora (Valencian: [lalˈkoɾa]; Spanish: [lalˈkoɾa]) is a municipality in the comarca of Alcalatén, Valencian Community, Spain.

== History ==
Traces of human presence in the area date from the Bronze Age. Also present are remains from the Iberian, Roman and Moorish ages, the latter including the castle, which gives the name to L'Alcora's comarca. The fortress was reconquered by the Christians in 1233, after which the current town started to expand at the expenses of the fortress's previous borough.

== Main sights ==
- Castle of Alcalatén (10th-13th centuries), a Moorish fortress later modified after the Christian conquest. It has an irregular triangular plan, with two large towers.
- Hermitage of St. Vincent (1598)
- Hermitage of St. Christopher (17th century)
- Iberian settlement of Montmirá
- Fortified hermitage of El Salvador
- Museum of Ceramics (Royal Factory of Alcora faience)

== See also ==
- List of municipalities in Castellón
