= Aga Lesiewicz =

Aga Lesiewicz has lived in London for more than thirty years and has been a radio presenter, voice-over artist, interpreter, screenwriter and a TV producer and director during a varied career. A serious knee injury in 2013 forced another change in career, prompting her to write her first book Rebound. Exposure (Pan Macmillan, 2017) is her second novel. She is currently working on her third London-based psychological thriller.

== Bio ==
Daughter of Maria Ciesielska and Witold Lesiewicz.
