= Gloria Alcorta =

Argentine writer, poet and sculptor

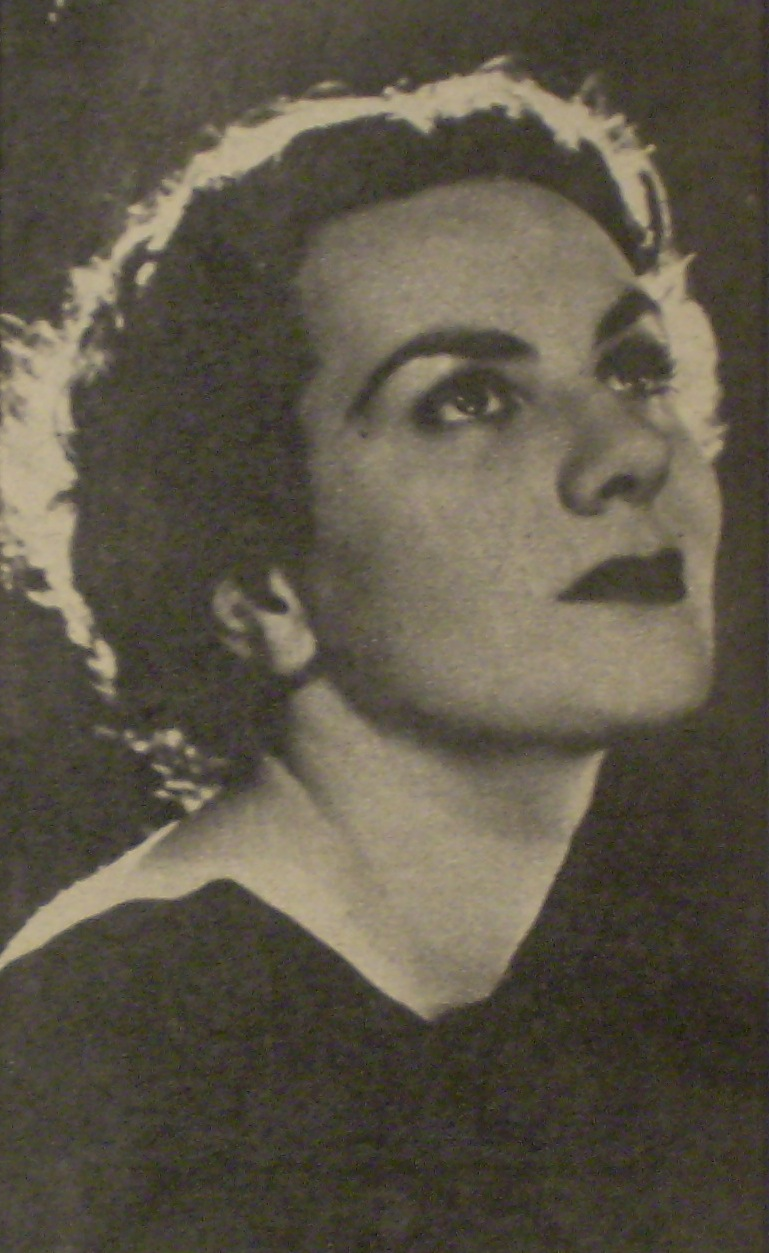
- Born: September 30, 1915; Bayonne, France
- Died: February 25, 2012 (aged 96); Buenos Aires, Argentine
- Occupations: Writer, poet, film critic, artist
- Spouse: Alberto Girondo Uriburu
- Relatives: Eduarda Mansilla (grandmother); Oliverio Girondo (brother-in-law)
- Awards: Prix Médicis

Signature
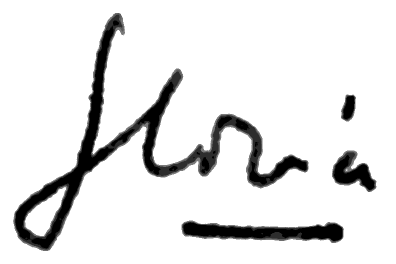

Gloria Alcorta (30 September 1915 – 25 February 2012) was an Argentine writer, poet and sculptor.

== Early life and art career ==
Alcorta was the daughter of Rodolfo Alcorta, painter and Argentinean diplomat to France, and Rosa Mansilla, daughter of writer Eduarda Mansilla. As a child, she was a voracious reader and showed great passion for sculpture, as well as an aptitude for music and painting.

When her mother died in 1932, she was sent to live with her aunt and uncle in Rome. While there, she would both learn Italian and meet a young Luchino Visconti. Alcorta was enrolled in a Calvinist school in Rome, where she continued reading, writing, and painting. She got good grades, but would later be expelled for slapping a nun after discovering that the nun had confiscated and burned several of her books, including her copy of Les Fleurs du mal. After her expulsion, her uncle brought her back to live with her father in Argentina. On the boat there, she would meet and become the mentee of Silvina Ocampo, who would later introduce her to Jorge Luis Borges.

From 1934-1938 she studied sculpture in Paris. Her work was shown in several exhibitions alongside other artists, as well as in solo exhibitions at galleries in Montevideo and L'Alcora. She received second place in the 1935 Salón Femenino in Buenos Aires, as well as a silver medal at the 1937 Paris World's Fair.

== Writing career ==
Alcorta was fluent in both Spanish and French, publishing works in both languages. Her first literary work was a 1935 book of poems in French titled La Prison de l'enfant, it is prefaced by Jorge Luis Borges and illustrated by Héctor Basaldúa. La Prison de l'enfant would receive praise from the contemporary poets Saint-John Perse and Jules Supervielle.

Alcorta was reportedly interested in the poetry of Oliverio Girondo, and may have been inspired by him. She married Girondo's brother, Alberto Girondo Uriburu, with whom she had three children. Family obligations forced her to stop writing for a time, but she would return around 1945 with the short story Magálica, which was published in La Nación.

In 1951 she published the Spanish-language poem Visages which was translated into French by Rafael Alberti and given the Prix Rivarol award for Best Foreign Work. In addition to poetry and short stories, she also wrote the 1954 play Le seigneur de Saint Gor, which would premiere at the Théâtre des Arts.

A short story she wrote called El hotel de la luna was published in the Sur magazine in 1956. José Pepe Bianco, the director of Sur at the time, encouraged her write a collection of similar stories. This led to her most well-known work: the 1958 El hotel de la luna y otras imposturas, a collection short stories with mainly female protagonists. The French translation of El hotel de la luna y otras imposturas was released in 1966, where it became the first Argentinean work to be awarded the Prix Médicis. Other works of hers include the 1961 short story collection Noches de nadie and the 1964 fiction novel En la casa muerta.

She lived in Paris and would write film criticism throughout her career. Alcorta attended a private screening of the now-lost 1936 Benjamin Fondane film Tararira. In the 60s, she would go to the Cannes Film Festival to report on Argentinian films showing there.

== Publications ==
Year	Title	Notes
1935	La Prison de l'enfant	Poetry collection
1951	Visages	Poetry collection
1958	El hotel de la luna y otras imposturas	Short story collection
1966	En la casa muerta	Fiction
1978	L'oreiller noir	Short story collection
1989	Le crime de Doña Clara	Fiction
1997	Travesías	Written with Olga Orozco and Antonio Requeni
