= Melinda Nadj Abonji =

Hungarian-Swiss writer, musician and artist

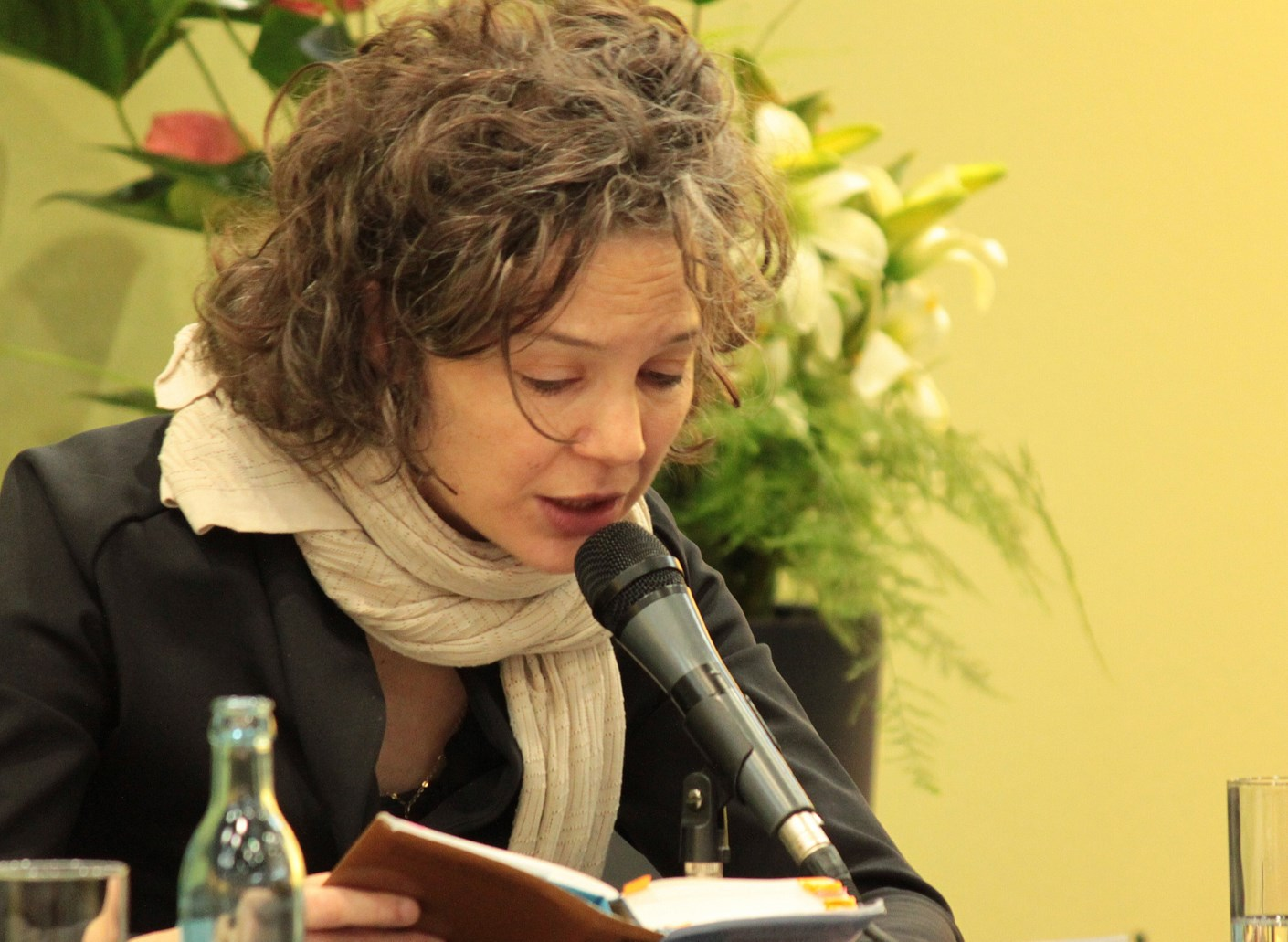
- Nadj Abonji at a reading in 2011
- Born: 22 June 1968 (age 58); Bečej, Yugoslavia
- Occupation: Writer

Signature
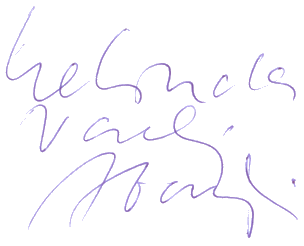

Melinda Nadj Abonji (born 22 June 1968 in Bečej, Yugoslavia) is a Hungarian-Swiss writer, musician, and performance artist. Melinda Nadj Abonji was born in the Hungarian part of Vojvodina, in present-day Serbia. She came to Switzerland at the age of 5 to join her refugee parents.

After finishing her studies at the University of Zurich, she wrote a novel, Fly Away, Pigeon, based on her refugee experiences, which in 2010 won the German Book Prize and the Swiss Book Prize.

== Works ==
- Nadj Abonji, Melinda (2010). Tauben fliegen auf Roman (in German). Salzburg: Jung und Jung. ISBN 978-3-902497-78-9. OCLC 699608457.
- —— (2011). Im Schaufenster im Frühling Roman (in German). Salzburg: Jung und Jung. ISBN 978-3-902497-86-4. OCLC 712435209.
- —— (2017). Schildkrötensoldat Roman (in German). Berlin: Suhrkamp Verlag. ISBN 978-3-518-42759-0. OCLC 984749412.

=== English translations ===
- Abonji, Melinda Nadj (2014). Fly Away, Pigeon. Calcutta: Seagull Books. ISBN 978-0-85742-212-5.
