= Yang Yi (author) =

Chinese-born novelist

- Born: June 18, 1964 (age 62); Harbin, China
- Education: Ochanomizu University
- Occupations: Novelist, lecturer
- Children: Two
- Relatives: Chen Tien-shi (cousin)
- Writing career
- Pen name: Liu Qiao
- Language: Chinese, Japanese
- Notable awards: Akutagawa Prize, Bungakukai Newcomer's Prize

Yang Yi (simplified Chinese: 杨逸; traditional Chinese: 楊逸; pinyin: Yáng Yì) (born June 18, 1964) is the pen name of Liu Qiao, a Chinese-born novelist who has lived in Japan since 1987.

Yang was born in the Chinese city of Harbin and remains a Chinese citizen. In 2008, she won the 139th Akutagawa Prize for her Japanese language novel Tokiga nijimu asa (literally, A Morning When Time Blurs). She is thus far the only Chinese national and, along with Li Kotomi, one of only two non-native Japanese speakers to win the award.

Currently she is a visiting professor at Kanto Gakuin University and a professor at Nihon University.
