= Shahan Shahnour =

French-Armenian writer and poet

Shahan Shahnour (Armen Lubin) Շահան Շահնուր
- Born: Shahnour Kerestejian; 3 August 1903; Constantinople, Ottoman Empire
- Died: 20 August 1974 (aged 71); Saint-Raphaël, France
- Occupations: French Armenian writer and poet

Shahan Shahnour (August 3, 1903, Istanbul – August 20, 1974, Saint-Raphaël), Armenian: Շահան Շահնուր, French transliteration Chahan Chahnour), who signed his French language writings as Armen Lubin (Արմէն Լիւպէն) was a French-Armenian writer and poet. He is considered a renowned Diasporan author in the Western Armenian tradition with his own style of writing.

== Biography ==
Shahan Shahnour was born Shahnour Kerestejian in a suburb of Constantinople (Istanbul), Ottoman Empire. He graduated from Berberian High School in 1921 and started contributing to "Vosdan" paper, mostly with translations.

In 1923, he moved to Paris, where he worked as a photographer, and in 1929 published his first novel, Retreat Without Song, after a serialized publication in the Harach newspaper of Paris (it is translated into several languages). In 1933 he published his second book, also written in Armenian, The Betrayal of the Gods, a collection of short stories.

In 1937, he fell victim to the bone disease osteolysis, which disabled him and caused him much pain and suffering for the rest of his life, mostly spent in hospitals after he lost his home in 1939.

In 1945, having partially recovered from his illness, he started writing in French under the name Armen Lubin, and from then on he was acclaimed as a French poet and received several literary awards. He published in French several collections of poetry: The Furtive Passer-by, Sacred Patience, The Nightly Transport, The High Cage, and Fire With Fire.

In 1962, a collection of his Armenian works was printed in Yerevan in Soviet Armenia by the Armenian State Press. Several collections of his Armenian essays were published from 1958 to 1973, including Two Red Notebooks (1967) and The Open Register (1971).

Shahnour died on August 20, 1974, in the hospital of Saint-Raphaël, in southern France. He is buried in Père Lachaise Cemetery.

== Books ==
Shahnour, Shahan.

- Նահանջը առանց երգի [Retreat without Song] (Paris: Masis, 1929).
- Յարալէզներուն դաւաճանութիւնը [The Betrayal of the Gods] (Paris: Der-Hagopian, 1933)
- Թերթիս կիրակնօրեայ թիւը [The Sunday Issue of Our Paper] (Beirut: Krikor Keusseyan, 1958)
- Զոյգ մը կարմիր տետրակներ [A Pair of Red Notebooks] (Beirut, 1967)
- Ազատն Կոմիտաս [Gomidas the Freeman] (Paris: Haratch, 1970)
- Բաց տոմարը [The Open Register] (Paris: Haratch, 1971)
- Կրակը կողքիս [The Fire in My Flank] (Paris: Haratch, 1973)
- Երկեր [Works], 2 vols. (Yerevan: Sovetakan Grogh, 1982–1983)
- Թատերական պատկերներ [Theatrical Scenes] (Beirut: Shirak, 1986)
- Սիրտ սրտի [Heart to Heart] (Paris: Haratch, 1995)
- Retreat without Song, trans. Mischa Kudian (London: Mashtots Press, 1982).
- The Tailor's Visitors, trans. Mischa Kudian (London: Mashtots Press, 1984).

Lubin, Armen.

- Le passager clandestin [The Furtive Passer-by] (Paris: Gallimard, 1946).
- Sainte patience; poemes [Sacred Patience: Poems] (Paris: Gallimard, 1951).
- Transfert nocturne [The Nightly Transfer] (Paris: Gallimard, 1955).
- Les hautes terrasses; poemes [The High Cage: Poems] (Paris: Gallimard, 1957).
- Feux contre feux [Fire against Fire] (Paris: B. Grasset, 1968).
- Les logis provisoires (Mortemart: Rougerie, 1983).
- L'etranger [The Foreigner] (Troyes: Cahiers Bleus, 1984).
