= Notre-Dame de Paris: Version intégrale =

1998 cast recording

Cast recording by various artists
- Released: 1998
- Genres: Pop/rock, show tunes
- Labels: Pomme Music; Columbia

Notre-Dame de Paris: Version intégrale, also known as Notre-Dame de Paris: Complete Cast Production, is a double album containing a live cast recording of Luc Plamondon and Richard Cocciante's musical Notre-Dame de Paris. It was originally released in France in 1998 on the Pomme Music record label.

Subsequently, a video version was made and marketed; see the "Video version" section below.

== Background ==
The album was recorded live in October 1998 at the Palais des congrès de Paris.

== Critical reception ==
Professional ratings
Review scores
Source	Rating
AllMusic	4/5 stars

In a retrospective review, AllMusic rates the album 4 stars out of 5.

== Track listing ==
2 × CD – Pomme Music 952 462

All lyrics are written by Luc Plamondon; all music is composed by Richard Cocciante.

Disque 1 (Acte I)
No.	Title	Note(s)	Length
1.	"Ouverture"		1:02
2.	"Le temps des cathédrales"	Gringoire	3:23
3.	"Les sans-papiers"	Clopin	3:36
4.	"Intervention de Frollo"	Frollo; Phœbus	0:31
5.	"Bohémienne"	Esmeralda	5:21
6.	"Esmeralda tu sais"	Clopin	1:46
7.	"Ces diamants-là"	Fleur-de-Lys; Phœbus	1:59
8.	"La fête des fous"	Gringoire; la Foule	3:54
9.	"Le pape des fous"	Quasimodo	2:54
10.	"La sorcière"	Frollo; Quasimodo	1:17
11.	"L'enfant trouvé"	Quasimodo	1:43
12.	"Les portes de Paris"	Gringoire	1:57
13.	"Tentative d'enlèvement"	Phœbus; Esmeralda	1:51
14.	"La cour des miracles"	Clopin; Chœur des Truands; Esmeralda	5:13
15.	"Le mot Phœbus"	Esmeralda; Gringoire	1:01
16.	"Beau comme le soleil"	Esmeralda; Fleur-de-Lys	2:01
17.	"Déchire"	Phœbus	3:13
18.	"Anarkia"	Frollo; Gringoire	0:53
19.	"À boire"	Frollo; Chœrs; Quasimodo	1:51
20.	"Belle"	Quasimodo; Frollo; Phœbus	4:54
21.	"Ma maison c'est ta maison"	Quasimodo; Esmeralda	3:06
22.	"Ave Maria païen"	Esmeralda	3:36
23.	"Je sens ma vie qui bascule"	Frollo	0:23
24.	"Tu vas me détruire"	Frollo	3:04
25.	"L'ombre"	Phœbus; Frollo	1:30
26.	"Le val d'amour"	Gringoire; Chœurs; Phœbus	3:04
27.	"La volupté"	Phœbus; Esmeralda	2:14
28.	"Fatalité"	Gringoire; Frollo; Clopin; Fleur-de-Lys; Quasiomodo	1:30

Disque 2 (Acte II)
No.	Title	Note(s)	Length
1.	"Florence"	Frollo; Gringoire	4:10
2.	"Les cloches"	Gringoire; Frollo; Quasimodo	5:39
3.	"Où est-elle ?"	Frollo; Gringoire; Clopin	2:39
4.	"Les oiseaux qu'on met en cage"	Esmeralda; Quasimodo	3:10
5.	"Condamnés"	Clopin	2:54
6.	"Le proces"	Frollo; Esmeralda	1:26
7.	"La torture"	Frollo; Esmeralda	1:13
8.	"Phœbus"	Esmeralda	1:39
9.	"Être prêtre et aimer une femme"	Frollo	3:35
10.	"La monture"	Fleur-de-Lys	2:20
11.	"Je reviens vers toi"	Phœbus	1:43
12.	"Visite de Frollo à Esmeralda"	Frollo; Esmeralda	1:13
13.	"Un matin tu dansais"	Frollo; Esmeralda	2:39
14.	"Libérés"	Quasimono; Clopin; Gringoire; Esmeralda	2:29
15.	"Lune"	Gringoire	3:13
16.	"Je te laisse un sifflet"	Quasimodo	0:40
17.	"Dieu que le monde est injuste"	Quasimodo	3:49
18.	"Vivre"	Esmeralda	3:57
19.	"L'attaque de Notre-Dame"	Clopin; Frollo; Phœbus; Esmeralda	4:30
20.	"Déportés"	Phœbus	1:14
21.	"Mon maître, mon sauveur"	Quasimodo; Frollo	2:08
22.	"Donnez-la moi"	Quasimodo	0:44
23.	"Danse mon Esmeralda"	Quasimodo	4:52
24.	"Danse mon Esmeralda"	Saluts; Instru	3:40
25.	"Le temps des cathédrales"	Rappel	3:00

== Cast ==
- Esmeralda: Hélène Ségara
- Frollo: Daniel Lavoie
- Gringoire: Bruno Pelletier
- Quasimodo: Garou
- Phœbus: Patrick Fiori
- Clopin: Luck Mervil
- Fleur-de-Lys: Julie Zenatti

== Charts ==
=== Weekly charts ===
Chart (1998–1999)	Peak position
Belgian Albums (Ultratop Wallonia)	9
French Albums (SNEP)	2
Chart (2001)	Peak position
Italian Albums (FIMI)	44

=== Year-end charts ===
Chart (1998)	Position
France (SNEP)	13
Chart (1999)	Position
Belgium (Ultratop Wallonia)	54
France (SNEP)	10

== Certifications ==
Region	Certification	Certified units/sales
Belgium (BRMA)	Gold	10,000^{*}
^{*} Sales figures based on certification alone.

== Video version ==
Notre-Dame de Paris: Version intégrale, Enregistrement public au Palais des congrès de Paris

Video by various artists
- Released: 7 October 1999

The video recording was made on 16 and 17 January 1999 at the Palais des congrès de Paris and was made available on VHS and on DVD on 7 October 1999. In just two months, it was sold in 100,000 copies in France and was certified Diamond by SNEP.

According to the covers, the cast is the same as on audio CD. The track list is also the same as on CD, but with a behind-the-scenes documentary as an added bonus.

=== Track listing ===
DVD – Pomme Music DVD 952 509

Acte I

1. Ouverture
2. Le temps des cathédrales
3. Les sans-papiers
4. Intervention de Frollo
5. Bohémienne
6. Esmeralda tu sais
7. Ces diamants-là
8. La fête des fous
9. Le pape des fous
10. La sorcière
11. L'enfant trouvé
12. Les portes de Paris
13. Tentative d'enlèvement
14. La cour des miracles
15. Le mot Phœbus
16. Beau comme le soleil
17. Déchire
18. Anarkia
19. À boire
20. Belle
21. Ma maison c'est ta maison
22. Ave Maria païen
23. Je sens ma vie qui bascule
24. Tu vas me détruire
25. L'ombre
26. Le val d'amour
27. La volupté
28. Fatalité

Acte II

29. Florence
30. Les cloches
31. Où est-elle?
32. Les oiseaux qu'on met en cage
33. Condamnés
34. Le procès
35. La torture
36. Phœbus
37. Être prêtre et aimer une femme
38. La monture
39. Je reviens vers toi
40. Visite de Frollo à Esmeralda
41. Un matin tu dansais
42. Libérés
43. Lune
44. Je te laisse un sifflet
45. Dieu que le monde est injuste
46. Vivre
47. L'attaque de Notre-Dame
48. Déportés
49. Mon maître, mon sauveur
50. Donnez-la moi
51. Danse mon Esmeralda
52. Danse mon Esmeralda (Saluts)
53. Le temps des cathédrales
54. Making of de 15' env. :
  document inédit sur le spectacle Notre Dame de Paris

=== Certifications ===
Certifications for the video version
Region	Certification	Certified units/sales
France (SNEP)	Diamond	100,000^{*}
^{*} Sales figures based on certification alone.
