= List of works by Daniel Lavoie =

This is a list of works by Canadian singer Daniel Lavoie.

== Discography ==
=== Studio albums ===
- Mes longs voyages (2016)
- Daniel Lavoie: La Licorne captive – Un projet musical de Laurent Guardo (2014)
- J'écoute la radio (2011)
- Où la route mène, 2CDs + DVD (2008)
- Docteur Tendresse (2007)
- Moi, mon Félix (2005)
- Comédies Humaines (2004)
- Roulé Boulé: Je suis une boule qui roule, CD + storybook (2004)
- Où la route mène (2002)
- Le bébé dragon 2 (1997)
- Le bébé dragon (1996)
- Ici / Où la route mène (1995)
- Woman to man (1994)
- Here in the heart (1992)
- Douce heure, Compilation (1991)
- Long courrier / Chanson de la Terre (1990)
- Tips (1986)
- Vue sur la mer (1986)
- 10 sur 10, Compilation (1984)
- Tension Attention / Ils s'aiment (1983)
- Aigre doux, how are you? (1981)
- Cravings (1981)
- Nirvana bleu (1979)
- Berceuse pour un lion (1976)
- À court terme (1975)

=== Live albums ===
- Lavoie Et Le Grand Choeur (2009)
- Live au Divan Vert, Best of / Le meilleur de Daniel Lavoie (1997)
- Olympia (1987)

=== Singles ===
- Où la route mène (Country: Canada.2008)
- La voilà notre armée (Country: Canada.2007)
- Docteur tendresse (Country: France.2007)
- Leïla (CountryCanada.2004)
- L'amour est juste (Country: France.2004)
- Bénies soient les femmes (Country: Canada.2004)
- Je pensais pas (Country: France. 1998)
- Weak For love (Maxi 45 tours) (Janvier Musique, Tréma- Spécial promo 1993)
- Allume la TV (Réédition, mars 1992, MCA 9210 CD compilation)
- Here in the heart / Leaders (Country: Canada. 1992)
- Hello Louise (Country: Canada. 1992)
- Assis entre deux (Montréal, 1991, Trafic 170691)
- Jours de plaine / Pape du rap (Trafic, Trema-Pathé Marconi 1991)
- Le pape du rap (avec Billy Williams; diverses versions Londres, 1990, Trafic 9056 30 cm)
- Qui sait? / Bess (WEA Music 1990)
- Que cherche-t-elle? Que cherche-t-elle?(en spectacle) (Londres, février 1988, Trafic 88213)
- Ridiculous Love (Ils s'aiment) / Hôtel Québec(mai 1988, Trafic 88221 30 cm)
- Dis-lui, dis-lui Mona (version remaniée) (Londres, juin 1988, Trafic 7CDN-57)
- Les longs manteaux (Paris, novembre 1988, Trafic 88236)
- La villa de Ferdinando Marcos sur la mer / Bamboula (Londres, mars 1987, Trafic 87191)
- Human Woman (Lys et délices) / Sad Eyes (La nuit se lève) (Londres, mai 1987, Capitol 73025)
- La nuit se lève / La nuit se lève (nouvelle version) (Londres, août 1987, Trafic 87204 30 cm; EMI SP-1332 30 cm (Europe))
- Le nuit se lève (new) / La ballade des salades (Emi France, Pathé Marconi 1987)
- Never Been To New York (Je voudrais voir New York) / City Boy (La vie de vie de ville) (Londres, août 1987, Capitol 44051 30 cm)
- Ridiculous Love (Ils s'aiment) / Danger (Québec, octobre 1986, Capitol 73009)
- Je voudrais voir New York / La vie de vie de ville (Londres, novembre 1986, Trafic 86180)
- Que cherche-t-elle / Dis lui, dis-lui Mona (WEA Music 1986)
- Les longs manteaux / Rio mulatos (Emi, Pathé Marconi 1986)
- Human Woman / Sad eyes (Emi France, MLRF 1986)
- Dis-lui, dis-lui Mona / Tell me Mona (Maxi 45-tours) (Janvier Musique, Trafic)
- Fouquet's / inst. (Québec, février 1985, Kébec-Disc KD-9263)
- Ravi de te revoir / inst. (Québec, 1985 Kébec-Disc KD-9296)
- Tension Attention (new) / Ravi de te revoir (Emi France, Pathé Marconi 1985)
- Roule ta boule / Photo-mystère (Québec, mars 1984, Kébec-Disc KD-9229)
- Ils s'aiment / Le métro n'attend pas (Québec, août 1984, Kébec-Disc KD-9253)
- Ils s'aiment / Hôtel (Emi France 1984)
- Tension Attention / Fouquet's (Emi France, Pathé Marconi 1984)
- Tension Attention (Québec, novembre 1983, Kébec-Disc KD-9219)
- C'est-i vraiment du Rock and Roll ? L'aventure-lure (Montréal, 1982, WEA 72015)
- Passe passe et le temps (Montréal, 1982, WEA 72017)
- Le tout lundi / Marlène (Montréal, 1982, WEA 72020)
- C'est comme ton tour (Montréal, 1982, WEA 72024)
- Ann Jaloo / So long (Montréal, 1981, Sefel 401)
- Henry / Baby Blues (Montréal, 1981, Sefel 408)
- Boule qui roule / Sans importance (Montréal, 1980, Apex 98012)
- Mon île / Marlène (Arabella Eurodisc 1980)
- Mes vacances d'été / Saint-Côme Express (inst.) (Montréal, 1979, Apex 98003)
- La danse du smatte / Allume la TV (Montréal, 1979, Apex 98007)
- La danse du smatte / C'est pas la pluie (Janvier Musique, Arabella Eurodisc 1979)
- Dans l'temps des animaux / Never Get To Sing The Blues (Montréal, 1977, Deram 648)
- Garçon des Cantons / Commercial pour un jet (Montréal, 1977, Deram 659)
- Une rose / Les niaiseries (Montréal, May 1974, London FC-1051)
- J'ai quitté mon île / Des hauts dans la journée (Montréal, 1974, London FC-1065)
- Marie connue / La fête des anges (Montréal, November 1973, London FC-104)

=== Songs written/produced and albums produced for other artists ===
- Hart-Rouge – Inconditionnel. Canada (1991). The album is written by Daniel Lavoie in collaboration with André Lambert.
- Celine Dion – Incognito. Canada (1992). Music to the song "Lolita".
- Luce Dufault

– Luce Dufault. Canada( 1996). Music to the song "Laissez-nous la chance".
– Des milliards de choses. Canada. (1998). Music to the songs "Des milliards de choses", "Chanson pour Anna", "Je m'appelle solitude", "T'aurais jamais du", "No deeper love".
– Au delà des mots. Canada (2001). Music to the songs "Mon Roi de France", "Remember Corsica", "Sergueï est au piano".
– Bleu Canada(2004). Music to the song "Toutes les villes du monde".

- Louise Forestier – Forestier chante Louise. Canada (1997). Music to the songs "Motel Desert Inn", "Ma vie ne te regarde plus", "La peur d'aimer", "Tu peux t'en aller", "Quand j'aime un home", "Tu me manques", "Ruptures", "Désespérée mais gai".
- Lara Fabian

– Pure. France (1998). Lyrics to the song "Urgent Désir".
– Nue. France (2001). Music to the song "Je suis mon Coeur".

- Maurane

– Une fille très scène. Canada. (1998). Music to the song "Tu es parti".
– Quand l'humain danse. Canada (2003). Music to the song "Sans demander".

- Claude Gauthier – Jardins. Canada (1998).Music to the song "Est-ce si loin le Québec".
- Bruno Pelletier

– D'autres rives. Canada. (1998) Music to the songs "Le bon gars et le salaud", "Restera et Restera".
– Un monde à l'envers. Canada (2002). Music to the songs "Je crois pourtant", "Ma jalousie", "Madeleine".
– Microphonium. Canada (2009). Music to the songs: «J`ai Menti»,«J`en veux».

- Natasha St Pier – A chacun son histoire. Canada (2000). Lyrics to the song "Je t'aime encore".
- Isabelle Aubret – Le Paradis Des Musiciens. France (2000). Music to the song "Si Tu Veux Rester Mon Ami".
- Roch Voisine – Roch Voisine. Canada (2001). Music to the song "Demande à La Puissière".
- Mireille Mathieu – De tes mains. France (2002). Music to the song "Pense à moi".
- Nana Mouskouri – Fille du soleil . France (2002). Lyrics to the song "Cette chance là".
- Nolwenn Leroy –Nolwenn. France (2003). Music to the song: «Une femme cache».
- Florent Pagny – Ailleurs Land. France (2003). Music to the song "Le Feu a La Peau".
- Jean Guidoni – Trapèze. France (2004). Music to the songs "La peur", "Pise", "Néant neon", "La naiade", "Le miroir", "Thé de Chine", "L'ogre", "Maman maman", "Le feu à la peau".
- Isabelle Boulay – Tout un jour. France (2004). Music to the song "Aimons nous".
- Julie Zenatti – Comme vous. France (2005). Music to the song "Homme Soeur".
- Judi Richards – Du septième ciel. Canada (2007). Lyrics to the songs "Du septième ciel", "Pattes de velours".
- Eric Lapointe – Ma peau. Canada (2008). Lyrics for song in collaboration with Louise Forestier "1500 miles".
- Marie-Élaine Thibert – Je Suis. Canada (2011). Lyrics to the song "Rupture en soie".
- Renée Martel – Une femme libre. Canada (2012). Lyrics to the song "Comme un courant".
- Gilles Vigneault – Vivre debout. Canada (2014). Album producer.

== Filmography ==
=== Acting ===
- Antigone 34 (TV series), 2012 (Paul)
- Félix Leclerc (TV mini-series), 2005 (Félix Leclerc)
- The Book of Eve, 2002 (Johnny Brancusi)
- Notre-Dame de Paris (TV movie), 1998 (Frollo)
- The Return of Tommy Tricker, 1994 (The Businessman)
- General Hospital, 1992, episode (as himself)
- Le fabuleux voyage de l'ange, 1991
- Entre l'effort et l'oubli, 1990
- Boogie-woogie 47 (TV series), 1980 (Jean Lorion)

=== Composing ===
- Les longs manteaux (1987)
- Entre l'effort et l'oubli (1990)
- Le fabuleux voyage de l'ange (ONF, 1991)
- Jours de plaine (short, 1991)
- Whiskers (TV, 1997)
- Aujourd'hui ou jamais (Jean-Pierre Lefebvre) (1998)
- Pinocchio (1999)
- Ludovic II: Un crocodile dans mon jardin (short, 2001)
- Ludovic: Visiting grandpa (short, 2002)
- Ludovic: The Snow Gift (short, 2002)
- Ludovic: Magic in the Air (short, 2003)

== Musical theater ==
- Sand et les Romantiques, 1992 (Delacroix)
- Notre-Dame de Paris, 1998 (Frollo)
- Le Petit Prince by Riccardo Cocciante, 2002 (L'Aviator)
- Nelligan, 2005 (Vieux Émile)
- Douze hommes rapaillés chantent Gaston Miron, 2008
- 12 hommes rapaillés chantent Gaston Miron. / Volume 2, 2010
- Notre-Dame de Paris Album Live 2017 Coffret Digipack, 2017 (Pomme music)

== Books ==
Roulé boulé : je suis une boule qui roule / chansons de Daniel Lavoie; illustrées par Oksana Kemarskaya. [Montréal] : La Montagne secrète, 2004.

Finutilité : essai / Daniel Lavoie. Saint-Boniface, Man. : Plaines, 2011.

Particulités : les dieux, les planètes, les particules, et enfin la terre / Daniel Lavoie. Saint-Boniface, Man. : Plaines, 2015.
