= Notre-Dame de Paris (disambiguation) =

Notre-Dame de Paris is a Gothic cathedral in Paris, France.

Notre-Dame de Paris may also refer to:

- Notre-Dame de Paris (novel), an 1831 novel by Victor Hugo, known in English as The Hunchback of Notre Dame
- Notre-Dame de Paris (1911 film), a 1911 French film, released in the US as The Hunchback of Notre Dame, based on the novel
- Notre-Dame de Paris (1956 film), a 1956 French film, released in 1957 in the US as The Hunchback of Notre Dame, based on the novel
- Notre-Dame de Paris (ballet), a 1965 ballet by French choreographer Roland Petit, based on the novel
- Notre-Dame de Paris (operatic melodrama), a Latvian operatic melodrama which debuted on 1997, in Riga
- Notre-Dame de Paris (musical), a 1998 sung-through French-Canadian musical by Riccardo Cocciante and Luc Plamondon, based on the novel, which debuted in Paris
  - Notre-Dame de Paris (album), a 1998 concept album
  - Notre-Dame de Paris: Version intégrale, a 1998 live cast album
  - Notre-Dame de Paris: Version anglaise, a 2000 English-language cast album
- Virgin of Paris, a statue of the Virgin Mary in the Notre-Dame de Paris cathedral

== See also ==
- Notre Dame (disambiguation)
