= Notre-Dame de Paris (album) =

Cast recording by various artists
- Released: 15 or 19 January 1998
- Recorded: 1997
- Genres: Pop/rock, show tunes
- Labels: Pomme Music; Sony Music labels (since 1999)

Notre-Dame de Paris is a concept album containing a studio cast recording of Luc Plamondon and Richard Cocciante's musical Notre-Dame de Paris. It was originally released in France on 19 January 1998 on the Pomme Music record label.

== Release ==
The premiere of the musical was planned for 16 September 1998, and the album was intended to promote it.

== Sales and distribution ==
The album topped the charts in France and francophone Belgium.

In March 1999, Billboard reported that the album had "already sold more than 3 million copies worldwide on the Pomme label, which is distributed by Sony [Music]," and that the latter company had just acquired the "worldwide recording rights" to the musical and "all future sales w[ould] be through Sony labels."

== Critical reception ==
Professional ratings
Review scores
Source	Rating
AllMusic	3/5 stars

In a retrospective review, AllMusic rates the album 3 stars out of 5.

== Track listing ==
CD – Pomme Music 952 342

All lyrics are written by Luc Plamondon; all music is composed by Richard Cocciante.

No.	Title	Performed by	Length
1.	"Le temps des cathédrales"	Gringoire (Bruno Pelletier)	3:20
2.	"Les sans-papiers"	Clopin (Luck Mervil)	3:33
3.	"Bohémienne"	Esmeralda (Noa)	5:24
4.	"Belle"	Quasimodo, Frollo, Phœbus (Garou, Daniel Lavoie, Patrick Fiori)	4:37
5.	"Tu vas me détruire"	Frollo (Daniel Lavoie)	3:13
6.	"La cour des miracles"	Clopin (Luck Mervil)	5:43
7.	"Ave Maria païen"	Esmeralda (Noa)	3:34
8.	"Florence"	Frollo, Gringoire (Daniel Lavoie, Bruno Pelletier)	4:12
9.	"Les cloches"	Gringoire, Frollo, Quasimodo (Bruno Pelletier, Daniel Lavoie, Garou)	5:33
10.	"Etre prêtre et aimer une femme"	Frollo (Daniel Lavoie)	3:44
11.	"Déchiré"	Phœbus (Patrick Fiori)	3:20
12.	"La monture"	Fleur-de-Lys (Julie Zenatti)	2:27
13.	"Dieu que le monde est injuste"	Quasimodo (Garou)	3:46
14.	"Vivre"	Esmeralda (Noa)	3:59
15.	"Lune"	Gringoire (Bruno Pelletier)	3:14
16.	"Danse mon Esmeralda"	Quasimodo (Garou)	4:33

== Cast ==
- Esmeralda: Noa
- Quasimodo: Garou
- Gringoire: Bruno Pelletier
- Clopin: Luck Mervil
- Frollo: Daniel Lavoie
- Phœbus: Patrick Fiori
- Fleur-de-Lys: Julie Zenatti

== Charts ==
=== Weekly charts ===
Chart (1998–1999)	Peak position
Belgian Albums (Ultratop Wallonia)	1
French Albums (SNEP)	1

=== Year-end charts ===
Chart (1998)	Position
Belgium (Ultratop Wallonia)	1
France (SNEP)	1
Chart (1999)	Position
Belgium (Ultratop Wallonia)	2
France (SNEP)	3

== Certifications ==
Region	Certification	Certified units/sales
Belgium (BRMA)	2× Platinum	40,000^{*}
France (SNEP)	Diamond	1,000,000^{*}
^{*} Sales figures based on certification alone.

== Awards ==
Year	Award type	Categories	Results	Ref.
1999	Victoires de la musique	Rock/Pop Album	Nominated	
