= Notre-Dame de Paris: Version anglaise =

- International CD cover

Cast recording by various artists
- Released: 2000
- Genres: Pop/rock, show tunes
- Labels: Pomme Music; Epic, Columbia

Notre-Dame de Paris: Version anglaise, also marketed as simply Notre-Dame de Paris, is an album containing a cast recording of the English-language adaptation of the musical Notre-Dame de Paris. It was released in 2000 in France on the Pomme Music record label and internationally by Sony's subsidiaries Epic Records and Columbia.

== Background ==
The musical was translated into English by American lyricist Will Jennings, who, according to a comparative analysis carried out by a Concordia University master's degree student, "reproduce[d] the style and content of the source text as closely as possible". Most of the original French album's recording cast also contributed to the English-language album. As noted by William Ruhlmann in his review for AllMusic, the French singers "adapt[ed] to the change in language without much trouble", "perhaps in part because Jennings' translations [were] so spare and simple."

The album also featured a guest appearance, Céline Dion, who opened with her rendition of the song "Live for the One I Love", repeated further on as sung by cast member Tina Arena. Dion's recording of the song, an English-language version of "Vivre", was previously available on her 1999 compilation titled All the Way... A Decade of Song.

== Critical reception ==
Professional ratings
Review scores
Source	Rating
AllMusic	3/5 stars

AllMusic rates the album 3 stars out of 5. William Ruhlmann begins his review by noting that the original musical and its recordings were an "enormous" hit in France, but fails to understand "what the French found so compelling". He writes, "this [album] makes [the musical] sound like a ballad-heavy show. Song after song is taken at a slow pace, with brief melodic motifs repeated over and over", and concludes that, based only on the album, he is "left wondering what all the fuss in Paris was about, since the show seems to drag along for most of its length." Among the cast, he singles out Garou, "who has a gravelly, Joe Cocker-like voice appropriate for the long-suffering Quasimodo." As for Tina Arena, he assesses her performance as "fine" and adds that he considers her version of "Live for the One I Love" to be better than that by "characteristically overexcited" Céline Dion.

On the other hand, in another review on the AllMusic website, Heather Phares describes the musical as "vivid and memorable" and Richard Cocciante's songs as "evocative".

== Track listing ==
CD – Pomme Music 952 612

No.	Title	Artist(s)	Length
1.	"Live for the One I Love"	Céline Dion
2.	"The Age of the Cathedrals"	Bruno Pelletier
3.	"The Refugees"	Luck Mervil
4.	"The Bohemienne Song"	Tina Arena
5.	"Belle (Is the Only Word)"	Garou / Daniel Lavoie / Steve Balsamo
6.	"My Heart If You Will Swear"	Natasha St-Pierre [sic]
7.	"Torn Apart"	Steve Balsamo
8.	"The Bells"	Garou
9.	"The Pagan Ave Maria"	Tina Arena
10.	"Your Love Will Kill Me"	Daniel Lavoie
11.	"Moon"	Bruno Pelletier
12.	"God You Made the World All Wrong"	Garou
13.	"I'm a Priest"	Daniel Lavoie
14.	"The Birds They Put in Cages"	Tina Arena / Garou
15.	"Cast Away"	Luck Mervil
16.	"Live for the One I Love"	Tina Arena
17.	"Dance My Esmeralda"	Garou

== Cast ==
- Esmeralda: Tina Arena
- Frollo: Daniel Lavoie
- Gringoire: Bruno Pelletier
- Quasimodo: Garou
- Phœbus: Steve Balsamo
- Clopin: Luck Mervil
- Fleur-de-Lys: Natasha St-Pier

== Charts ==
Chart (2000)	Peak position
French Albums (SNEP)	58
Swiss Albums (Schweizer Hitparade)	47
