= Bilan =

Bilan may refer to:

== People ==
- Dima Bilan (born 1981), Russian singer-songwriter
- Ihor Bilan (born 1973), Ukrainian football player
- Miro Bilan (born 1989), Croatian basketball player
- Olena Bilan (born 1979), Ukrainian economist

== Other ==
- Bilan (magazine), a Swiss French-language business magazine
- Biran, Iran, a.k.a. Birlan or Bīlān, a village in Bakeshluchay Rural District, in the Central District of Urmia County, West Azerbaijan Province, Iran
- "Le Bilan", a 1980 song by French singer Jean Ferrat
