= Vivre (Notre-Dame de Paris song) =

2000 single by Celine Dion

"Vivre" (lit. 'Live') is a song from the musical Notre-Dame de Paris, written by Luc Plamondon and Riccardo Cocciante. It was first recorded in 1997 by Noa and released on the Notre-Dame de Paris album in February 1998. The song was also recorded in 1998 by Hélène Ségara, who was selected to play Esmeralda in the musical, following Noa's withdrawal.

In 1999, Canadian singer Celine Dion recorded an English version titled "Live (for the One I Love)" with lyrics by Will Jennings. She included it on her 1999 greatest hits album, All the Way... A Decade of Song, and released it as a single in February 2000. Dion's recording and another version of "Live (for the One I Love)" by Tina Arena were included on the English-language edition of the Notre-Dame de Paris album.

== Noa version ==
"Vivre"

Single by Noa

from the album Notre-Dame de Paris
- B-side: "Les cloches"
- Released: February 1998
- Recorded: 1997
- Genre: Pop
- Length: 3:51
- Label: Pomme Music; Sony Music
- Songwriters: Riccardo Cocciante; Luc Plamondon
- Producers: Riccardo Cocciante; Jannick Top; Serge Perathoner

Noa singles chronology
"Lama" (1996)	"Vivre" (1998)	"Babel" (1999)

Notre-Dame de Paris singles chronology
"Vivre" (1998)	"Belle" (1998)

The Israeli singer Noa recorded the part of Esmeralda in French for the original cast album of the musical Notre-Dame de Paris. Released in February 1998, the soundtrack topped the albums chart in France for 17 weeks, was certified diamond, and eventually sold 2.5 million copies in France alone. It became one of the best-selling albums of all time in France.

"Vivre" was issued as the first single from the musical in February 1998. The track was produced by Riccardo Cocciante, Jannick Top, and Serge Perathoner. It peaked at number 20 in France in March 1998, and number 12 in Belgium's Wallonia in May 1998. "Vivre" was also included on Noa's greatest hits album, Le meilleur de Noa, in 1999.

=== Formats and track listing ===
- French CD single
1. "Vivre" – 3:51
2. "Les cloches" (Garou and Daniel Lavoie) – 5:32

=== Charts ===
Chart performance
Chart (1998)	Peak position
Belgium (Ultratop 50 Wallonia)	12
France (SNEP)	20

== Hélène Ségara version ==
In 1997, Hélène Ségara auditioned for the role of Esmeralda in Notre-Dame de Paris but lost to Noa. However, after recording the cast album, Noa decided that her hectic schedule would not allow her to join the stage production on tour. Faced with the need for an immediate replacement, Plamondon and Cocciante cast Ségara in the role.

Ségara included "Vivre" on the 1998 re-release of her album, Cœur de verre.

== Celine Dion version ==
"Live (for the One I Love)"

Single by Celine Dion

from the album All the Way... A Decade of Song
- B-side: "Then You Look at Me"
- Released: 14 February 2000
- Recorded: 1999
- Studio: Chartmaker (Los Angeles); Paradise Sounds (Florida)
- Genre: Pop
- Length: 3:58
- Label: Columbia
- Songwriters: Riccardo Cocciante; Luc Plamondon; Will Jennings
- Producers: David Foster; Humberto Gatica

Celine Dion singles chronology
"That's the Way It Is" (1999)	"Live (for the One I Love)" (2000)	"The First Time Ever I Saw Your Face" (2000)

Audio
- "Live (for the One I Love)" on YouTube

Following the success of the Notre-Dame de Paris musical, all of its songs were translated into English. "Vivre" became "Live (for the One I Love)" and was first recorded by Canadian singer Celine Dion for her 1999 greatest hits compilation, All the Way... A Decade of Song. The track was produced by David Foster and Humberto Gatica, and was issued as the album's second single in francophone countries on 14 February 2000.

Dion's version was also included on the English-language edition of the Notre-Dame de Paris album, released on 21 February 2000. At the time, it was reported that Luc Plamondon had created the role of Esmeralda with Dion in mind, which he told her when she attended the show in Paris.

=== Critical reception ===
In a review of the album, AllMusic senior editor Stephen Thomas Erlewine wrote that the song, along with "I Want You to Need Me" and "Then You Look at Me", "isn't bad, but isn't particularly memorable, especially compared to the hits".

=== Commercial performance ===
"Live (for the One I Love)" was commercially released in selected European countries on 14 February 2000 and reached number 47 in Belgium's Wallonia, number 63 in France, number 82 in Switzerland, number 89 in the Netherlands, and number 95 in Belgium's Flanders. An import-only CD single was also issued in Canada, where it reached number 23 on the Canadian Singles Chart. The song additionally peaked at number 12 on the airplay chart in Poland in March 2000.

=== Music video ===
The song's music video was directed by Bille Woodruff and released in 2000. It was later included on Dion's All the Way... A Decade of Song & Video DVD.

=== Live performances ===
Dion performed the song on French television in late 1999 during her promotional tour for the album. She also sang it live during the final show of the Let's Talk About Love World Tour, dubbed the "Millennium Concert", on 31 December 1999.

=== Formats and track listing ===
- European CD single
1. "Live (for the One I Love)" – 3:58
2. "Then You Look at Me" – 4:09
- European CD maxi-single
1. "Live (for the One I Love)" – 3:58
2. "Then You Look at Me" – 4:09
3. "Un garçon pas comme les autres (Ziggy)" (live) – 3:19

=== Charts ===
Chart performance
Chart (2000)	Peak position
Belgium (Ultratop 50 Flanders)	95
Belgium (Ultratop 50 Wallonia)	47
Canada (Canadian Singles Chart) Import-only single	23
France (SNEP)	63
Netherlands (Dutch Top 40 Tipparade)	22
Netherlands (Single Top 100)	89
Poland Airplay (Music & Media)	12
Switzerland (Schweizer Hitparade)	82

== Tina Arena version ==
"Live for the One I Love"

Single by Tina Arena

from the album Notre-Dame de Paris
- B-side: "Live for the One I Love" (soda club radio mix)
- Released: 6 March 2000
- Genre: Pop
- Length: 3:58
- Label: Columbia
- Songwriters: Riccardo Cocciante; Luc Plamondon; Will Jennings
- Producer: Ric Wake

Tina Arena singles chronology
"Les trois cloches" (2000)	"Live for the One I Love" (2000)	"The Flame" (2000)

Audio
- "Live For The One I Love" on YouTube

Tina Arena played Esmeralda in the London production of the musical in 2000. Her version was released as a single in the United Kingdom on 6 March 2000 and reached number 63 on the UK Singles Chart in May 2000. Arena's recording was produced by Ric Wake. She performed the song at the 2000 World Music Awards in Monte-Carlo, where she received the award for the world's best-selling Australian recording artist of the year.

=== Formats and track listing ===
- UK CD single
1. "Live for the One I Love" – 3:37
2. "Live for the One I Love" (soda club radio mix) – 3:16
3. "Live for the One I Love" (show version) – 3:50
4. "Live for the One I Love" (video) – 3:41

=== Charts ===
Chart performance
Chart (2000)	Peak position
UK Singles (Official Charts)	63

== Other versions ==
In 2000, after Tina Arena's original run as Esmeralda in the London production, fellow Australian singer and actress Dannii Minogue took over the role. Although her version of "Live for the One I Love" was never issued as a single, a live music video was recorded, showing her performing on stage in costume. The video was later included on the 2007 DVD Dannii Minogue: The Video Collection.

In 2016, Lebanese singer Hiba Tawaji was cast as Esmeralda for the French revival of the musical. In November of that year, her version of "Vivre" was released for download and streaming. The accompanying music video, shot in Paris, shows scenes along the river Seine with the Notre-Dame de Paris cathedral in the background.
