= Jean Ferrat =

French singer-songwriter and poet

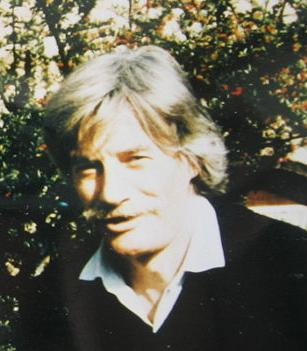
- Jean Ferrat

Background information
- Born: Jean Tenenbaum; 26 December 1930; Vaucresson, France
- Died: 13 March 2010 (aged 79) Aubenas, France
- Occupations: singer, songwriter, composer
- Years active: 1958–2009
- Labels: Decca (1960–62); Barclay (1963–76) then (in French) Temey
- Website: www.jean-ferrat.com

Jean Ferrat (born Jean Tenenbaum; 26 December 1930 – 13 March 2010) was a French singer-songwriter and poet. He specialized in singing poetry, particularly that of Louis Aragon.

== Biography ==
Ferrat was born in Vaucresson, Hauts-de-Seine, the youngest of four children from a modest family which moved to Versailles in 1935, where Ferrat studied at the Jules Ferry College. His Russian-born father (naturalized in 1928) was forced to wear the yellow star and deported to Auschwitz in 1942, where he died.

In the early 1950s, he started in Parisian cabaret. After that he avoided any particular musical style, but remained faithful to himself, his friends and his public. In 1956, he set "Les yeux d'Elsa" ("Elsa's eyes"), a Louis Aragon poem which Ferrat loved, to music. Its rendition by popular artist André Claveau brought Ferrat some initial recognition as a songwriter.

His first 45 RPM single was released in 1958, without success. It was not until 1959, with publisher Gérard Meys, who also became his close friend and associate, that his career started to flourish. He signed with Decca and released his second single, "Ma Môme", in 1960 under the musical direction of Meys.

In 1961, Ferrat married Christine Sèvres, a singer who performed some of his songs. She died in 1981 at age 50. He met Alain Goraguer, who became an arranger of his songs. His debut album, Deux Enfants du Soleil, was released that year. Ferrat also wrote songs for Zizi Jeanmaire and went on the road, sharing billing with her at the Alhambra for six months.

Nuit et Brouillard ("Night and Fog"), which followed in 1963, was awarded the Académie Charles Cros's Grand Prix du Disque and showed any topic could be put in songs. Ferrat toured again in 1965, but stopped performing on stage in 1973.

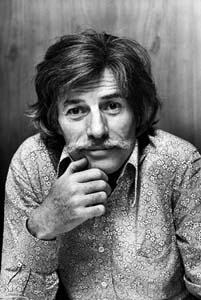
1980

In 1990, he received an award from the Société des auteurs, compositeurs et éditeurs de musique, (SACEM) the French association of songwriters, composers and music publishers.

Jean Ferrat is a graduate of the Conservatoire national des arts et métiers.

== Death ==
Ferrat died in Aubenas, Ardèche, following a long illness at the age of 79. He lived in Antraigues-sur-Volane, a small village of not even 700 people in Ardeche.

== Acclaim ==
In 2013 Ferrat's song, Nuit et Brouillard, appeared in the BBC's list of 20 songs that changed the world.

In 2015, a tribute album was released by Columbia Records where various artists interpreted songs by Jean Ferrat. The 15-track album titled Hommage à Jean Ferrat: Des airs de liberté contained performances by artists Marc Lavoine, Cali, Dionysos, Julien Doré, Patrick Bruel, Catherine Deneuve, Benjamin Biolay, Raphaël, Patrick Fiori, Grégoire, Sanseverino, Hubert-Félix Thiéfaine, Zebda, Natasha St Pier, Patricia Petibon & Marc Lavoine and "Ma France" sung by Jean Ferrat. The album charted in France, Belgium and Switzerland.

== Discography ==
- 1961 : Deux enfants au soleil ("Ma Môme", "Federico Garcia Lorca", etc.)
- 1962 : La fête aux copains ("Les petits bistrots", "L'homme à l'oreille coupée", etc.)
- 1963 : Nuit et brouillard ("C'est beau la vie", "Nous dormirons ensemble", etc.)
- 1964 : La Montagne ("Que serais-je sans toi", "Hourrah !", etc.)
- 1965 : Potemkine ("C'est toujours la première fois", "On ne voit pas le temps passer", etc.)
- 1966 : Maria ("Heureux celui qui meurt d'aimer", "Un enfant quitte Paris", etc.)
- 1967 : À Santiago ("Cuba si", "Les Guérilleros", etc.)
- 1969 : Ma France ("Au printemps de quoi rêvais-tu ?", "L'Idole à papa", etc.)
- 1970 : Camarade ("Sacré Félicien", "Les Lilas", etc.)
- 1971 : La Commune ("Les touristes partis", "Aimer à perdre la raison", etc.)
- 1971 : Ferrat chante Aragon ("Le Malheur d'aimer", "Robert le Diable", etc.) sold more than 2,000,000 copies
- 1972 : À moi l'Afrique ("Une femme honnête", "Les Saisons", etc.)
- 1975 : La femme est l'avenir de l'homme ("Dans le silence de la ville", "Un air de liberté", etc.) sold 500,000 copies
- 1979 : Les Instants volés ("Le Tiers chant", "Le chef de gare est amoureux", etc.)
- 1980 : Ferrat 80 ("L'amour est cerise", etc.) certified platinum record
  - including Le Bilan
- 1985 : Je ne suis qu'un cri ("La Porte à droite", "Le Chataîgnier", etc.)
- 1991 : Dans la jungle ou dans le zoo ("Les Tournesols", "Nul ne guérit de son enfance", etc.)
- 1995 : Ferrat chante Aragon Vol. 2 - Ferrat 95 ("Complainte de Pablo Neruda", "Les feux de Paris", "Lorsque s'en vient le soir", etc.)
- 2002 : Ferrat en scène ("Dingue", "Chante l'amour", Le grillon", etc.)

Compilations

- 2009: Best Of (3 CDs)
