= Anne Etchegoyen =

French singer

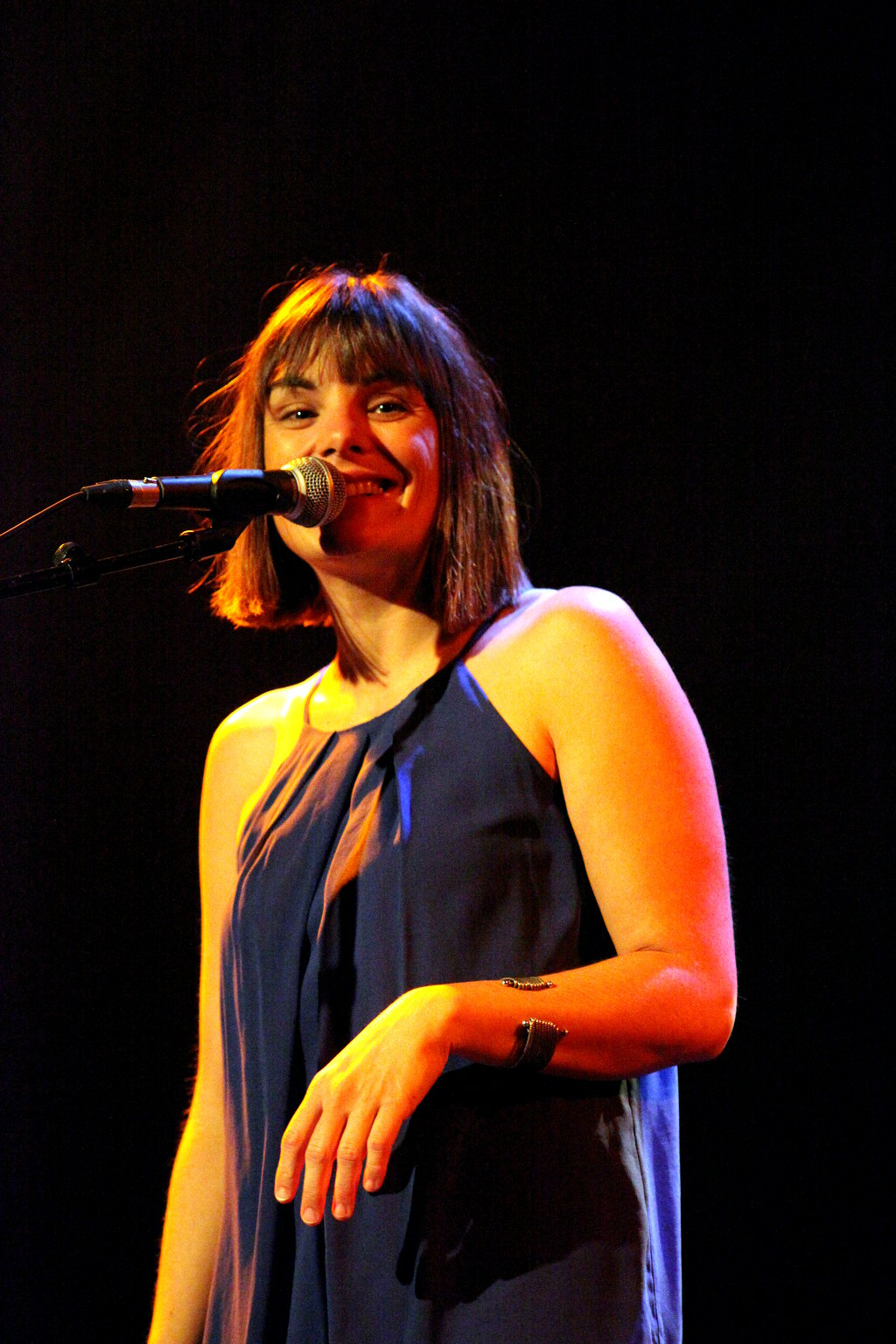

Background information
- Born: Anne Etchegoyen; 1980 (age 45–46)
- Origin: Saint-Palais, Pyrénées-Atlantiques, France
- Genres: folk
- Website: www.anne-etchegoyen.com

Anne Etchegoyen (French pronunciation: [an etʃeɡojɛ̃]; Basque: Anne Etxegoien; born 1980 in Saint-Palais, Lower Navarre) is a Basque French singer and songwriter. Etchegoyen sings in Basque, French, Spanish and Gascon. She has released four albums, including two solo, and two in collaboration with the Basque Men's Choir Aizkoa. Her popularity greatly increased throughout France after appearing and singing with various other groups in the 6-episode Le Chœur du Village. The series was broadcast on France 3 in April 2013. We can't forget anyway that She was already known for singing 3 times the French national anthem La Marseillaise, in 2003 for the World Championship in Athletics In Paris, in 2009 for the Basketball World Cup and in 2010 during a Rugby Union Test match between France and Argentina. Etchegoyen's latest album, Les Voix Basques ("The Basque Voices"), has been awarded gold record in France after selling more than 60,000 copies. Etchegoyen has gone on a world tour performing in several countries, including Argentina, the United States, England, Ireland and Spain. Currently she is on the Basque eta Paz tour, to spread her idea of peace for the Basque Country.

== Early life ==
Etchegoyen was born in 1980 in Saint-Palais (in Basque Donapaleu) in the Northern Basque Country, Aquitaine. At the age of eight Etchegoyen joined a local choir in Saint-Palais Soon thereafter she would study in the musical school of Bayonne.

== Discography ==
=== Albums ===
Solo

- Pachamama (2008)
- Adelante (2010)

Anne Etchegoyen et le Chœur Aizkoa

Year	Album	Peak positions
Year	Album	FR
2013	Les voix basques	11
2014	Ongi etorri	54

Other collaborations

- Les voix célestes du Pays Basque chantent Noël (2005)
