= Le Bilan =

Le Bilan (translation : The Balance Sheet) is a 1980 song of the French singer Jean Ferrat.

In this song, Jean Ferrat remembers communist commitments of his youth and the young people of his generation who, having participated in the social movements of the 1930s, the secret war during World War II and post-war years, have seen their ideals betrayed by the Stalinist Communists and their successors.

He denounces the repeated lies, rigged trials, misinformation, etc., of the Soviet government.

The title of the song derives from words of Georges Marchais on 23 April 1979. According to the leader of the French Communist Party, the balance of the Soviet Union was "generally positive", that denies Jean Ferrat.

== See also ==
- Stalinism
- Slánský trial
