= Olena Bilan =

Ukrainian economist

Olena Bilan (Ukrainian: Олена Білан) is a Ukrainian economist. She is a Chief Economist at the Dragon Capital (since 2009), a Ukraine's leading investment bank, joining in 2006. She is a member of the board of directors for Kyiv School of Economics (since 2016). Olena Bilan was named a top-three analyst in the Ukrainian financial market in the Thomson Reuters Extel survey of global institutional investors in 2013 and 2014. She collaborates with the Ministry of Finance.

In 2002, she graduated with honors from the then Kyiv School of Economics (KSE). She was a student of Professor Serhiy Korablin. Her thesis was called "Investigating Liquidity Effect in the Ukrainian Interbank Market". She also graduated from the Igor Sikorsky Kyiv Polytechnic Institute in 2002.

She is a member of the Editorial Board for VoxUkraine.

Bilan's expertise has been noted or her opinion quoted in the BBC, Radio Free Europe/Radio Liberty, Ukrinform, Financial Times, The Wall Street Journal, Reuters.

== Works ==
- Bilan, Olena. In Search of the Liquidity Effect in Ukraine. [Journal Article] Journal of Comparative Economics. Vol. 33 (3). p 500-516. September 2005.
- Siliverstovs, Bosiss, and Olena Bilan, 2005. Modeling Inflation Dynamics in Transition Economies: The Case of Ukraine. Eastern European Economics Vol. 43, No. 6, pp. 66–81.
- Bilan, Olena. Monetary and Exchange Rate Developments in Ukraine: Present and Future. [Collective Volume Article] The Periphery of the Euro: Monetary and Exchange Rate Policy in CIS Countries. Vinhas de Souza, Lucio. De Lombaerde, Philippe, eds., Transition and Development series. Aldershot, U.K. and Burlington, Vt.: Ashgate. p 347-58. 2006.
- Vinhas de Souza, Lucio; Schweickert, Rainer; Movchan, Veronica; Bilan, Olena; Burakovsky, Igor. Now So Near, and Yet Still So Far: Relations between Ukraine and the European Union. [Collective Volume Article] Return to Growth in CIS Countries: Monetary Policy and Macroeconomic Framework. Vinhas de Souza, Lucio. Havrylyshyn, Oleh, eds., Berlin and New York: Springer, 2006.
- Bilan, Olena and Kryshko, Maxym. Does Monetary Policy Transmission in Ukraine Go Through the Interest Rates? (September 30, 2008). EERC Working Paper Series.
- Ukraine Crisis Media Center, “Urgency and priorities for the reforms in Ukraine,” joint with Roger B. Myerson, George Logush, and Tymofiy Mylovanov, September 10, 2014.
