= Notre-Dame de Paris (musical) =

French musical by Riccardo Cocciante and Luc Plamondon

- Notre-Dame de Paris – English version (CD cover)
- Music: Riccardo Cocciante
- Lyrics: Luc Plamondon (French lyrics); Will Jennings (English lyrics)
- Book: Luc Plamondon
- Basis: Victor Hugo's novel The Hunchback of Notre Dame
- Productions: 1998 Paris; 1999 International tour 2000 Las Vegas; 2000 West End; 2001 Paris; 2001 Barcelona; 2002 Italy tour 2002 Moscow; 2005 International tour 2005 Montreal; 2007 South Korea tour 2010 Antwerp; 2010 Concert tour 2011 Italy tour 2012 International tour 2013 Seoul; 2014 International tour 2016 Italy tour 2016 Seoul; 2016 Gdynia; 2016 Paris; 2017 International tour 2018 Astana; 2022 Italy tour
- Awards: Guinness World Records

Notre-Dame de Paris is a sung-through French musical which debuted on 16 September 1998 in Paris. It is based upon the novel Notre-Dame de Paris (known in English as The Hunchback of Notre-Dame) by the novelist Victor Hugo. The music was composed by Riccardo Cocciante (also known as Richard Cocciante) and the lyrics are by Luc Plamondon.

Since its debut, it has been professionally played in Belgium, Bulgaria, Canada, China, France, Italy, Japan, Lebanon, Luxembourg, Poland, Russia, Singapore, South Korea, Spain, Switzerland, Taiwan, Turkey, United Kingdom and United States, and has been translated into eight languages (English, Spanish, Italian, Russian, Korean, Flemish, Polish, and Kazakh). A shorter version in English was performed in 2000 in Las Vegas, Nevada (United States) and a full-length London production, also in English, ran for seventeen months. Several songs from the show, such as "Vivre", "Belle" and "Le temps des cathédrales", have been released as singles with a huge success in French speaking countries.

Notre-Dame de Paris, according to the Guinness Book of Records, had the most successful first year of any musical ever. The score has been recorded at least seven times to date (2007): the original French concept album, which featured Israeli singer Achinoam Nini (aka Noa) as Esmeralda was followed by a live, complete recording of the original Paris cast. A complete recording of the score in Italian was made, along with a single disc of highlights in Spanish from the Barcelona production. The original London cast album featured several of the original Paris stars, but only preserved a fraction of the score in English.

== Synopsis ==
=== Act I ===
The story is set in Paris in the year 1482. The poet Gringoire, who throughout the story acts not only as a participant but also as a sort of commentator, enters to set the scene for the story; he relates how Man has written his history in the building of the cathedrals ("Le temps des cathédrales").

The homeless and refugees, led by Clopin, swarm before the entrance to the Cathedral of Notre Dame begging for help and sanctuary ("Les sans-papiers"). Frollo, the Archdeacon of Notre Dame, orders Phoebus, the Captain of the Royal Archers, to have his men disperse the crowd ("Intervention de Frollo"). As his men are driving off the refugees, Phoebus catches sight of the beautiful Romani girl Esmeralda (in later productions, the scene changes to have him see her while she is dancing before Notre Dame) and is entranced by her. Esmeralda tells him about herself, her life as a traveller, and her dreams ("Bohémienne"). Instead of arresting her, Phoebus leaves her alone.

Clopin, who has watched over Esmeralda since she was eight years old after the death of her parents, tells her that she is no longer a child and that she has reached the age where she will discover love ("Esmeralda tu sais"). He warns her to be extremely careful, since not all men are to be trusted.

In the next number, the audience is introduced to the nobly-born and beautiful Fleur-de-Lys, to whom Phoebus is engaged to be married. Fleur-de-Lys's love for Phoebus is childish and irrational, like that of Juliet for Romeo ("Ces diamants-là").

Now begins the wild and coloured Feast of Fools, presided over by Gringoire ("La fête des fous"), the climax of which is the choosing of the King of Fools from among the group of people who can make the ugliest face; the King will be crowned by Esmeralda. Hiding in the shadows is a monstrous figure who is dragged out into the light; it is the bell-ringer of Notre Dame, the hunchbacked and facially deformed Quasimodo. By unanimous decision, Quasimodo is chosen and crowned as the King of Fools, but he knows that for all the power he has this one day nothing can make a woman such as Esmeralda care for him ("Le pape des fous").

Frollo breaks up the festivities and orders Quasimodo to kidnap Esmeralda and bring her to him that night so that she can be imprisoned as a sorceress and a violator of public decency ("La sorcière"). Quasimodo, who is devoted to Frollo for raising and educating him after he had been abandoned as a baby ("L'enfant trouvé"), says he will obey.

Night falls on Paris with its dark and hidden secrets commented on by Gringoire ("Les portes de paris"). Quasimodo stalks Esmeralda through the dark streets and is about to seize her when Phoebus and his guards arrive and arrest Quasimodo. Phoebus introduces himself to Esmeralda. He makes a date for a rendezvous with her the next night at the Cabaret du Val d'Amour. Phoebus and his men take Quasimodo away and Esmeralda darts off into the darkness ("Tentative d'enlèvement").

At the Court of the Miracles, the haven for all of the outcasts of Paris, Clopin presides over a wild revel, remarking that all are truly equal here no matter their race, religion, skin color or criminal background ("La cour des miracles"). Gringoire, who has wandered in accidentally, is seized and Clopin tells him that he will be hanged for his trespassing – unless one of the women will agree to marry him. Esmeralda who has arrived during this, agrees to marry Gringoire (in name only) and Clopin, as King of the Outcasts, unites them and they join in the wild revelry.

Later, when Gringoire and Esmeralda are left alone ("Le mot Phoebus") he introduces himself to her as "the Prince of the Streets of Paris" and assures her that while he is not a "ladies' man" ("un homme à femmes"), he would be glad if she would be his Muse and inspiration. Since Gringoire is educated, Esmeralda asks him what the word "Phoebus" means; he tells her that in Latin it means "the sun" or "sun god". Esmeralda muses on the word as it romantically relates to the man Phoebus ("Beau comme le soleil"); she is joined on stage by Fleur-de-Lys, who also muses on Phoebus (although she seems to be more apprehensive about him), but both believe that Phoebus will love them forever.

Phoebus himself is under no apprehensions about what kind of man he is – he wants both women, one as a wife and one as a temporary mistress ("Déchiré").

The next day, Frollo summons Gringoire to Notre Dame and questions him about Esmeralda, forbidding him to touch her. Gringoire changes the conversation by asking about a strange inscription in Greek on the wall of the Galerie des Rois in Notre Dame, the word "Ananké". Frollo tells him that "Ananké" means "Fate" in Greek. They watch as Quasimodo is dragged on stage bound on the Great Wheel as sentence for his attempted kidnapping of Esmeralda ("Anarkia").

Quasimodo endures his punishment, but cries out for water ("A boire"), a plea that is ignored by everyone. Suddenly Esmeralda appears and gives him a drink of water from her cup, an act of kindness that deeply touches the poor hunchback. He is then released from the Wheel, and he, Frollo and Phoebus sing about their different feelings for Esmeralda ("Belle"): Quasimodo about his growing feelings of tenderness for her, Frollo about his growing fascination for her, and Phoebus (watched jealously by Fleur-de-Lys) about his wish for an affair with her before he marries Fleur-de-Lys.

Quasimodo leads Esmeralda into Notre Dame and tells her how the cathedral has been his home and sanctuary, and now it can be hers whenever she needs one ("Ma maison c'est ta maison"). In spite of her initial fear of this strange, deformed man, Esmeralda is touched by his gentleness and finds herself warming towards Quasimodo. Left alone, Esmeralda, who has never prayed before, prays to the Virgin Mary ("Ave Maria païen"), while Quasimodo thinks of her ("Si tu pouvais voir en moi"). Frollo, secretly spying on Esmeralda, realizes that his lust for her will destroy him, but knows that he cannot resist nor does he want to ("Tu vas me détruire").

That night, Phoebus is on his way to the Cabaret du Val d’Amour for his rendezvous with Esmeralda when he realizes he is being stalked by a shadowy figure. The figure (Frollo in disguise) warns him to go no further ("L'ombre"), but Phoebus refuses to heed the threat and continues on his way.

At Val d’Amour, Gringoire (who seems to be a regular customer) remarks how everyone, no matter the race, creed or color, comes here for a good time of one kind or another ... for a very low price ("Le Val d’Amour"). Phoebus arrives (he seems to be a regular customer here too) and meets Esmeralda in a private room ("La volupté"). They embrace and are about to make love when Frollo rushes in and stabs Phoebus with Esmeralda's knife (which she had placed on the floor earlier). Esmeralda collapses over Phoebus’ body, Frollo makes his escape and Gringoire, Clopin, Frollo, Quasimodo and the Chorus comment on the terrible power of Fate ("Fatalité").

=== Act II ===
Frollo and Gringoire discuss the events and scientific discoveries taking place and how some of them (such as Johannes Gutenberg’s printing press and Martin Luther’s doctrines) are changing the world forever ("Florence"). Gringoire notices how silent the cathedral is and Frollo tells him that Quasimodo has not rung the bells for three days.

Up in the bell tower, Quasimodo recounts how the cathedral bells are his only friends and loves ("Les cloches"), especially the three "Maries": "Little Marie" which is rung for children's funerals, "Big Marie" which is rung when ships set sail and "Great Marie" which is rung for weddings. His greatest hope is that they will ring for Esméralda to hear that he loves her.

Frollo asks Gringoire where his "wife" is ("Où est Elle?"); Gringoire says he does not know and answers obliquely (but he tells Clopin, who has been searching for Esmeralda, that she has been imprisoned in the prison of La Santé and that she will be hanged if Clopin doesn't save her).

In her cell, Esmeralda compares herself to a caged bird and calls to Quasimodo to save her, while back at Notre Dame Quasimodo wonders about Esmeralda's disappearance three days earlier and fears for her safety ("Les oiseaux qu'on met en cage"). Clopin and a group of outcasts are arrested and thrown into the La Santé prison ("Condamnés") as Esmeralda is put on trial for the attempted murder of Phoebus and sorcery with Frollo as presiding judge ("Le procès" / "La torture"); when she refuses to confess, she is subjected to a foot-crushing torture until she cries out "I confess!" Frollo sentences her to death by hanging, but Esmeralda still professes her love for Phoebus and Frollo is left to suffer from the emotional torment of his unrequited passion ("Être prêtre et aimer une femme"). Esmeralda calls Phoebus to save her (“Phoebus”)

Elsewhere, a recovered Phoebus is confronted by Fleur-de-Lys, but he claims as an excuse that he was bewitched by Esmeralda's "sorcery" ("Je reviens vers toi"). Fleur-de-Lys tells him that he will still have her heart and love if he will swear to have Esmeralda executed ("La monture").

At five o'clock in the morning of the execution, Frollo visits Esméralda's cell and to her horror confesses to her that he knifed Phoebus out of love for her ("Visite de Frollo a Esmeralda" / "Un matin tu dansais") and offers her a choice: death on the gallows or life by giving him love. When Esmeralda rejects his advances, he tries to rape her, but Quasimodo (who has secretly followed him) frees Clopin and the other prisoners. Clopin attacks Frollo, knocking him unconscious, and releases Esméralda and they flee the prison to Notre Dame for sanctuary ("Libérés").

Gringoire sings to the moon ("Lune") in which he describes Quasimodo's pain and suffering because of his love for Esméralda.

Quasimodo leaves Esmeralda asleep in a safe place in Notre Dame ("Je te laisse un sifflet"), but bitterly reflects that while he will love her forever, his ugliness will ensure that she will never love him ("Dieu que le monde est injuste"). Alone, Esmeralda hopes that she will survive for the man she loves and sings about how Love has the power to change the world even should she die ("Vivre").

With Clopin and his people occupying Notre Dame, Frollo orders Phoebus and his men to break sanctuary and attack the cathedral to drive them out ("L’Attaque de Notre Dame"). Clopin and his people resist bravely but are no match for the armed soldiers, and in the first attack Clopin is fatally wounded. Dying, he begs Esmeralda to take his place as leader. The final battle has Esmeralda and her people facing off against Phoebus and his soldiers, but the result is a foregone conclusion – Esmeralda is captured and the outcasts defeated. Phoebus coldbloodedly hands Esmeralda over to be executed, orders the outcasts driven out of Paris ("Déportés") and leaves with Fleur-de-Lys.

Quasimodo, searching Notre Dame for Esmeralda, finds Frollo standing at the top of one of the towers and begs him to help Esmeralda ("Mon maître, mon sauveur"). Frollo, finally driven insane, shows him the sight of Esmeralda being hanged and to Quasimodo's horror announces that he is responsible. As he laughs wildly, the enraged Quasimodo seizes him and hurls him down the stairs of the tower to his death. As the executioners are cutting down Esmeralda's body from the gibbet, Quasimodo appears and demands that they give him her body ("Donnez-la moi"). Driving them away, he kneels beside her body and mourns her, promising to stay with her and that even in death they will not be parted ("Danse, mon Esmeralda").

After the curtain call, Gringoire leads the cast in a reprise of "Le temps des cathédrales".

== Musical numbers ==
Act I
| # | Original French Title^{1} | English Version Title^{2} | Performed by |
|---|---|---|---|
| 1 | Ouverture | Overture | Orchestra |
| 2 | Le temps des cathédrales | The Age of the Cathedrals | Gringoire |
| 3 | Les sans-papiers | The Refugees | Clopin, Chorus |
| 4 | Intervention de Frollo | Frollo's Intervention | Frollo, Phoebus |
| 5 | Bohémienne | The Bohemian Song | Esmeralda |
| 6 | Esmeralda tu sais | Esmeralda, You See | Clopin, Esmeralda |
| 7 | Ces diamants-là | So Look No More for Love | Fleur-de-Lys, Phoebus |
| 8 | La fête des fous | The Feast of Fools | Gringoire, Chorus |
| 9 | Le pape des fous | The King of Fools | Quasimodo |
| 10 | La sorcière | The Sorceress | Frollo, Quasimodo |
| 11 | L'enfant trouvé | The Foundling | Quasimodo |
| 12 | Les portes de Paris | The Doors of Paris | Gringoire |
| 13 | Tentative d'enlèvement | Kidnap Attempt | Phoebus, Esmeralda |
| 14 | La cour des miracles | The Court of the Miracles | Clopin, Esmeralda, Chorus |
| 15 | Le mot Phoebus | The Word Phoebus | Esmeralda, Gringoire |
| 16 | Beau comme le soleil | Shining Like the Sun | Esmeralda, Fleur-de-Lys |
| 17 | Déchiré | Torn Apart | Phoebus |
| 18 | Anarkia | Anarchy | Frollo and Gringoire |
| 19 | A boire | Water, Please! | Frollo, Quasimodo, Chorus |
| 20 | Belle | Beauty | Quasimodo, Frollo, Phoebus |
| 21 | Ma maison c'est ta maison | Home in the Sky | Quasimodo and Esmeralda |
| 22 | Ave Maria païen | Pagan Ave Maria | Esmeralda |
| 23 | Si tu pouvais voir en moi | If You Could See Inside Me | Quasimodo |
| 24 | Tu vas me détruire | Your Love Will Kill Me | Frollo |
| 25 | L'ombre | The Shadow | Phoebus and Frollo |
| 26 | Le val d'amour | At Val d'Amour | Gringoire, Phoebus, Chorus |
| 27 | La volupté | The Voluptary | Phoebus and Esmeralda |
| 28 | Fatalité | Destiny | Gringoire, Frollo, Quasimodo, Clopin, Fleur-de-Lys |
Act II
| # | Original French Title^{1} | English Version Title^{2} | Performed by |
| 29 | Florence | Talk to Me of Florence | Frollo and Gringoire |
| 30 | Les cloches | The Bells | Gringoire, Frollo, Quasimodo, Chorus |
| 31 | Où est-elle? | Where Is She? | Frollo, Gringoire, Clopin |
| 32 | Les oiseaux qu'on met en cage | The Birds They Put in Cages | Esmeralda and Quasimodo |
| 33 | Condamnés | Castaway | Clopin and Chorus |
| 34 | Le procès | The Trial | Frollo and Esmeralda |
| 35 | La torture | Torturer | Frollo and Esmeralda |
| 36 | Etre prêtre et aimer une femme | I'm a Priest | Frollo |
| 37 | Phoebus | Phoebus, If You Can Hear Me | Esmeralda |
| 38 | Je reviens vers toi | To Get Back to You | Phoebus |
| 39 | La monture | My Heart If You Will Swear | Fleur-de-Lys |
| 40 | Visite de Frollo à Esmeralda | Frollo's Visit to Esmeralda | Frollo and Esmeralda |
| 41 | Un matin tu dansais | One Bright Morning You Danced | Frollo and Esmeralda |
| 42 | Libérés | Free Today | Quasimodo, Clopin, Esmeralda, Gringoire, Chorus |
| 43 | Lune | Moon | Gringoire |
| 44 | Je te laisse un sifflet | This Small Whistle I Leave You | Quasimodo and Esmeralda |
| 45 | Dieu que le monde est injuste | God, You Made the World All Wrong | Quasimodo |
| 46 | Vivre | Live for the One I Love | Esmeralda |
| 47 | L'attaque de Notre-Dame | Attack of Notre-Dame | Clopin, Frollo, Phoebus, Esmeralda, Gringoire, Chorus |
| 48 | Déportés | By Royal Law | Phoebus and Chorus |
| 49 | Mon maître, mon sauveur | My Master, My Savior | Quasimodo and Frollo |
| 50 | Donnez-la moi | Give Her to Me | Quasimodo |
| 51 | Danse mon Esmeralda | Dance My Esmeralda | Quasimodo |

^{1}These titles follow French-language capitalization conventions (sentence case / init caps instead of title case)
^{2}English titles shown here are the title of the song in the English-language version of the production, and not necessarily a direct translation of the original song title.

== Staging ==
Director Gilles Maheu staged the show in concert style, with the principal singers standing downstage center, with non-singing dancers upstage. The orchestra and chorus were prerecorded; the principals wore very obvious boom microphones.

== Production history ==
The original production of Notre-Dame de Paris made musicals fashionable again in France and, since its inception, has spawned a number of other notable productions. As part of the publicity prior to the Paris opening three songs were released as singles: "Vivre", "Le temps des cathédrales", and "Belle". "Belle" became a huge hit, and was named Song of the Year in France, and nominated for Song of the Century.

Since its debut, the show has been professionally played in Belgium, Canada, China, France, Italy, Japan, Lebanon, Luxembourg, Poland, Russia, Singapore, South Korea, Spain, Switzerland, Taiwan, Turkey, United Kingdom, Ukraine and United States, and has been translated into seven languages (English, Spanish, Italian, Russian, Korean, Flemish, and Polish). A shorter version in English was performed in 2000 in Las Vegas, Nevada (United States) and a full-length London production, also in English, ran for seventeen months. Several songs from the show, such as "Vivre", "Belle" and "Le temps des cathédrales", have been released as singles with a huge success in French speaking countries. An English version of "Vivre" (Live for the One I Love) was released by Celine Dion and Tina Arena, and appears on the original London cast recording, even though Dion did not participate in the musical.

In 2000, Notre Dame de Paris was featured on Royal Variety Performance with Patti Russo as Esmeralda, John Partridge as Gringoire, and Garou (singer) as Quasimodo.

In 2010-2014 several concert versions of the musical which reunited the original cast were presented in Kyiv, Moscow, Saint-Petersburg, Paris and Beirut.

In February 2016 it was announced that a revival of the original musical Notre Dame de Paris is scheduled to open in November 2016 in the Palais des Congrès in Paris, followed by a tour in France.

A New York French tour was announced for 2020, but was pushed back to 2022 due to COVID-19.

Notre-Dame de Paris, according to the Guinness Book of Records, had the most successful first year of any musical ever. The score has been recorded at least seven times to date (2007): the original French concept album, which featured Israeli singer Achinoam Nini (aka Noa) as Esmeralda was followed by a live, complete recording of the original Paris cast. A complete recording of the score in Italian was made, along with a single disc of highlights in Spanish from the Barcelona production. The original London cast album featured several of the original Paris stars, but only preserved a fraction of the score in English. In 2023, Notre-Dame de Paris returns to the Original theatre Palais des Congrès on November 15 with the same cast, including Angelo Del Vecchio as Quasimodo, and Daniel Lavoie, who performed with Bruno Pelletier, the original Gringoire, as Frollo.

== Critical response ==
Critical reception in Great Britain was mixed, with praise for the music and choreography, and general disdain for the English translation of the lyrics and the show's overall direction. For example, The Times praised the "doleful energy" of Garou's Quasimodo and the "occasional imaginative production touches: huge bells with writhing, upside-down humans for clappers" but concludes "Another Les Mis this isn't." According to the Oxford Encyclopedia of Popular Music, the producer of the London show Michael White fought back this criticism: "This is not a musical but a rock show with a strong storyline. I think it is difficult for dramatic critics who have to understand everything from Shakespeare to Harold Pinter to understand that." Eventually, despite initially poor reviews, Notre-Dame de Paris "became the most successful of the Gallic-themed shows to open in the West End during 2000".

== Casts ==
=== Original Paris cast ===
- Hélène Ségara: Esmeralda
- Garou: Quasimodo
- Daniel Lavoie: Frollo
- Bruno Pelletier: Gringoire
- Patrick Fiori: Phoebus
- Luck Mervil: Clopin
- Julie Zenatti: Fleur-de-Lys

=== Original Las Vegas cast ===
- Janien Masse: Esmeralda
- Doug Storm: Quasimodo
- Francis Ruivivar, T. Eric Hart: Frollo
- Deven May: Gringoire
- Mark W Smith: Phoebus
- David Jennings: Clopin
- Jessica Grové: Fleur-de-Lys

=== Original Canadian French cast ===
- France D'Amour: Esmeralda
- Mario Pelchat: Quasimodo
- Robert Marien: Frollo
- Sylvain Cossette: Gringoire
- Pierre Bénard-Conway: Phoebus
- Charles Biddle Jr.: Clopin
- Natasha St-Pier: Fleur-de-Lys

=== Original Canadian English cast ===
- Alessandra Ferrari: Esmeralda
- Matt Laurent: Quasimodo
- Robert Marien: Frollo
- Richard Charest: Gringoire
- Yvan Pedneault: Phoebus
- Ian Carlyle: Clopin
- Myriam Brousseau: Fleur-de-Lys

=== Original London cast ===
- Tina Arena: Esmeralda
- Garou: Quasimodo
- Daniel Lavoie: Frollo
- Bruno Pelletier: Gringoire
- Steve Balsamo: Phoebus
- Luck Mervil: Clopin
- Natasha St-Pier: Fleur-de-Lys

=== Theatre Mogador cast ===
- Shirel: Esmeralda
- Adrian Devil: Quasimodo
- Michel Pascal: Frollo
- Cyril Niccolai: Gringoire
- Richard Charest: Phoebus
- Roddy Julienne: Clopin
- Claire Cappelletti: Fleur-de-Lys

=== Original Spanish cast ===
- Thais Ciurana: Esmeralda
- Albert Martínez: Quasimodo
- Enrique Sequero: Frollo
- Daniel Anglès: Gringoire
- Lisardo Guarinos: Phoebus
- Paco Arrojo: Clopin
- Elvira Prado: Fleur-de-Lys

=== Original Italian cast ===
- Lola Ponce: Esmeralda
- Giò Di Tonno: Quasimodo
- Vittorio Matteucci: Frollo
- Matteo Setti: Gringoire
- Graziano Galatone: Phoebus
- Marco Guerzoni: Clopin
- Claudia d'Ottavi: Fleur-de-Lys

=== Original Russian cast ===
- Teona Dolnikova: Esmeralda
- Vyacheslav Petkun: Quasimodo
- Alexander Marakulin: Frollo
- Vladimir Dybsky: Gringoire
- Anton Makarsky: Phoebus
- Sergey Li: Clopin
- Anastasia Stotskaya: Fleur-de-Lys

=== Original Korean cast ===
- Bada, Oh Jin-yeong, Mun Hye-won: Esmeralda
- Yun Hyeong-ryeol, Kim Beop-rae: Quasimodo
- Seo Beom-seok, Ryu Chang-woo: Frollo
- Kim Tae-hoon, Park Eun-tae, Jeon Dong-Suk: Gringoire
- Kim Seong-min, Kim Tae-hyeong: Phoebus
- Lee Jeong-yeol, Mun Jong-won: Clopin
- Kim Jeong-hyeon, Gwak Sun-young: Fleur-de-Lys

=== Original Belgian cast ===
- Sandrine Van Handenhoven: Esmeralda
- Gunther Thomas: Quasimodo
- Wim Van Den Driessche: Frollo
- Dennis ten Vergert: Gringoire
- Tim Driesen: Phoebus
- Clayton Peroti: Clopin
- Jorien Zeevaart: Fleur-de-Lys

=== Original Polish cast ===
- Maja Gadzińska, Ewa Kłosowicz: Esmeralda
- Michał Grobelny, Janusz Kruciński: Quasimodo
- Artur Guza, Piotr Płuska: Frollo
- Jan Traczyk, Maciej Podgórzak: Gringoire
- Przemysław Zubowicz, Maciej Podgórzak, Rafał Szatan: Phoebus
- Krzysztof Wojciechowski, Łukasz Zagrobelny: Clopin
- Kaja Mianowana, Weronika Walenciak: Fleur-de-Lys

=== Original Ukrainian cast ===
- Olha Zhmuryn - Esmeralda
- Zinoviy Karach - Quasimodo
- Anton Kopytin - Frollo
- Viktoriia Vasalatii - Fleur-de-Lys
- Viktor Romanchenko - Clopin
- Mykhailo Dimov - Gringoire
- Arkadii Voitiuk - Phoebus

== Recordings ==
=== Cast albums ===
- 1997: Notre-Dame de Paris – concept album
- 1998: Notre-Dame de Paris: Version intégrale – Original Paris Cast, live at the Palais des Congrès
- 2000: Notre-Dame de Paris: Version anglaise — London Studio Album
- 2001: French Studio Album
- 2001: Paris Cast (Live At The Théâtre Mogador)
- 2001: Original Spanish Cast
- 2001: Original Italian Cast
- 2002: Italian Cast, Live at the Arena di Verona
- 2002: Original Russian Cast
- 2002: French Studio Album with Les Choeurs de France
- 2005: Korean Tour Cast
- 2008: Original Korean Cast
- 2009: Original Highlights Russian Cast
- 2010: Original Flemish cast
- 2017: Paris Cast (live)

=== Instrumental albums ===
- 1999: Orchestral French and English versions by I Fiamminghi
- 2000: Piano version by Alan Lapointe
- 2003: Instrumental version of Italian Cast
- 2008: Instrumental version of Russian Cast

=== Video recordings ===
- 1999: Live At The Palais des Congrès
- 2001: Live At The Arena di Verona
- 2002: Live At The Channel One Russia
- 2008: Live At The Sejong Center

== See also ==
- Victor Hugo
