= Belle (Patrick Fiori, Daniel Lavoie and Garou song) =

1997 song

Single by Patrick Fiori, Daniel Lavoie, Garou

from the album Notre-Dame de Paris
- B-side: "Déchiré"
- Released: 1998
- Recorded: France, 1997
- Genre: musical
- Length: 4:36
- Label: Sony Music
- Songwriters: Luc Plamondon (text); Richard Cocciante (music)
- Producers: Richard Cocciante; Jannick Top; Serge Perathoner

Notre-Dame de Paris singles chronology
"Vivre" (1998)	"Belle" (1998)	"Le Temps des cathédrales" (1998)

"Belle" is a 1997 song performed by Patrick Fiori, Daniel Lavoie, and Garou, from the musical Notre-Dame de Paris. Released as a single in 1998, it was a hit in France and Belgium, topping the charts for many months. To date, the song is one of the best-selling singles of all time in these countries.

== Background and writing ==
As with the other songs from the musical, the text was written by Luc Plamondon, who had also written the musical Starmania in 1978, and the music was composed by Richard Cocciante. The musical arrangements were made by Richard Cocciante, Jannick Top and Serge Perathoner who also worked on the musical direction.

"Belle" is a romantic song in which the three singers, who respectively portrayed Quasimodo (Garou), Frollo (Daniel Lavoie) and Phoebus (Patrick Fiori), reveal in turn their love for Esmeralda, before singing the last verse together.

The theme of the song is based in Victor Hugo's 1831 novel Notre-Dame de Paris. In chapter VI of the Eighth book "Trois coeurs d'homme faits différemment" (Three men's hearts made differently), Phoebus, Frollo and Quasimodo watch Esmeralda who is sentenced to death. Phoebus is with his fiancée and though he turns pale when seeing Esmeralda proving he has feelings for her, he stays with his Fleur-de-Lys. Frollo is trying once again to propose Esmeralda a salvation, but in return he wants her to become his woman. And finally Quasimodo selflessly saves Esmeralda from death, only because of his enormous love for her.

== Other recording ==
Since its debut, it has been professionally played in Belgium, Canada, China, France, Italy, Japan, Lebanon, Luxembourg, Russia, Singapore, South Korea, Spain, Switzerland, Taiwan, Turkey, the UK and the US, and has been translated into seven languages (English, Spanish, Italian, Russian, Korean, Flemish and Polish). The song has thus been officially adapted into these languages, but several covers have been made in various languages.

The English-language version of the song, recorded by Steve Balsamo, Garou and Daniel Lavoie, is available on Notre Dame de Paris - Version anglaise.

All official versions of "Belle"
Language	Original cast			Title	Translation
Language	Quasimodo	Frollo	Phœbus	Title	Translation
English	Garou	Daniel Lavoie	Steve Balsamo	"Belle (is the only word)"	
Flemish	Gene Thomas	Wim Van Den Driescche	Tim Driesen	"Belle"	/
French	Garou	Daniel Lavoie	Patrick Fiori	"Belle"	"Beautiful"
Italian	Giò Di Tonno	Vittorio Matteucci	Graziano Galatone	"Bella"	"Beautiful"
Korean	윤형렬 (Yun Hyeong-ryeol)	서범석 (Seo Beom-seok)	김성민 (Kim Sung-min)	"아름답다" ("Arŭmdapda")	"Beautiful"
Polish	Michał Grobelny	Artur Guza	Przemysław Zubowicz	"Belle"	/
Russian	Вячеслав Петкун (Viatcheslav Petkoun)	Александр Маракулин (Alexander Marakoulin)	Антон Макарский (Anton Makarsky)	"Belle"	/
Spanish	Albert Martínez	Enrique Sequero	Lisardo Guarinos	"La palabra "belle""	"The word "belle""

== Chart performance ==
"Belle" charted on the French Singles Chart for 60 weeks, and was at the time the single with the most total weeks in the top 100, and the first one in the top 50, with 49 weeks. It entered the chart at number 96 on 9 May 1998, climbed slowly, reaching number one in its 18th week, which is one of the slowest climbs to the number one position. It was also the first single performed as a trio to reach number one on this chart. Its weekly sales began to rise when the musical was performed, from 12 September 1998. It stayed at the top for 18 consecutive weeks, which was at the time the record of the most weeks at number one (this record was beaten in 2000 by Lou Bega's "Mambo no. 5 (a Little Bit of...)", with 20 weeks). After that, the song managed to drop slowly, totaling 31 weeks in the top ten. Certified diamond disc by the Syndicat National de l'Édition Phonographique, it was the best-selling single of 1998.

In Belgium (Wallonia), the single debuted at number 24 on the Ultratop 40 Singles Chart, on 6 June 1998. It topped the chart for only six weeks, from 19 September to 24 October, remained in the top ten for 30 consecutive weeks, and fell off the top 40 chart after 44 weeks. It is the best-selling single of the year and the most successful song from 1995 in that country.

In 1999, the song was awarded 'Song of the year' at the Victoires de la Musique.

== Track listing ==
- CD single
1. "Belle" – 4:36
2. "Déchiré" by Patrick Fiori – 3:18

== Charts ==
=== Weekly charts ===
Chart (1998)	Peak position
Belgium (Ultratop 50 Wallonia)	1
France (SNEP)	1

=== Year-end charts ===
Chart (1998)	Position
Belgium (Ultratop 50 Wallonia)	1
France (SNEP)	1

Chart (1999)	Position
Europe (Eurochart Hot 100)	48

== Certifications ==
Region	Certification	Certified units/sales
Belgium (BRMA)	3× Platinum	150,000^{*}
France (SNEP)	Diamond	750,000^{*}
^{*} Sales figures based on certification alone.

== Awards ==
Year	Award	Category	Result	Ref.
1999	Victoires de la musique	Song of the Year	Won	

== Dadju, Gims and Slimane version ==
"Belle"

Single by Dadju, Gims and Slimane

from the album Le Fléau
- Released: 5 April 2021
- Recorded: 2021
- Genre: Pop
- Length: 4:26
- Label: Sony Music Entertainment / Play Two
- Songwriters: Luc Plamondon (text); Richard Cocciante (music)
- Producer: Renaud Rebillaud

Music video
- "Belle" by Dadju - Gims - Slimane on YouTube

On April 5, 2021, a cover version was released by the trio Dadju, Gims and Slimane on Play Two and Sony Music Entertainment, reaching number 36 on SNEP, the official French Singles Chart. A music video was also released in which they play a scene from the musical Notre-Dame de Paris in a modern setting.

Chart (2021)	Peak position
France (SNEP)	36
