= Patrick Fiori =

French singer (born 1969)

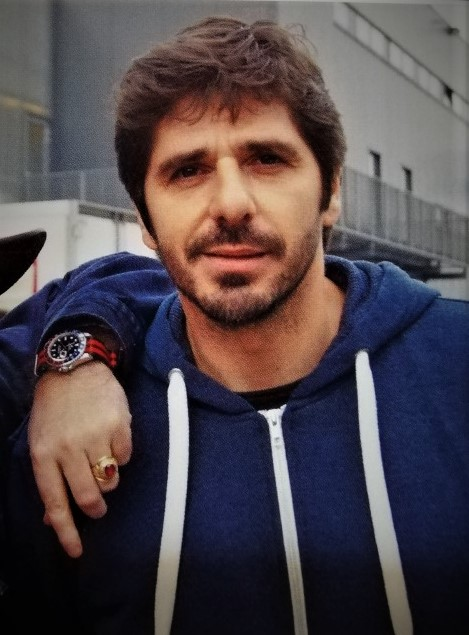
- Fiori in 2014

Background information
- Born: Patrick Chouchayan; 23 September 1969 (age 57); Marseille, France
- Genres: French pop, Pop rock
- Occupations: Singer; songwriter
- Years active: 1986–present
- Website: www.patrickfiori.net

Patrick Chouchayan (French pronunciation: [patʁik ʃuʃajɑ̃]; born 23 September 1969), known professionally as Patrick Fiori (French: [patʁik fjɔʁi], Corsican: [ˈfjɔri]), is a French singer.

== Biography ==
=== Beginnings ===
Fiori was born in Marseille to a French-Armenian father (Jacques Chouchayan) and a Corsican mother (Marie Antoinette Fiori). His father's family were escapees of the Armenian genocide. He was born in a family of five siblings. He spent part of his childhood in Marseille, south of France and part in Ajaccio in Corsica. He started music at the age of 12 in 1981 thanks to encouragement from Franck Fernandel, who offered him a role in the musical La Légende des santonniers. In 1985, at the age of 16, he recorded his first song, "Stéphanie" with financing from his parents, followed by other recordings like "Dans ton regard" and "Le Cœur à fleur d'amour".

=== Original successes, until 1993 ===
Taking part in Léon Zitrone's show Les Habits du dimanche gave him more exposure. In 1987, he opened for singer Gilbert Montagné for a number of shows. He later opened for other renowned artists like Michèle Torr and Barry White. In 1992, he had great success with "Au fil de l'eau" written by his childhood friend Bernard Di Domenico during the Francophonie. He won first prize during the Fenouillèdes Song Contest held in Sournia, the Pyrénées-Orientales. That year's event had been sponsored by Fabienne Thibeault, who encouraged him to go further in his career.

=== Eurovision Song Contest 1993 ===
In 1993, as he became well-known with the public, at 23, the songwriters François Valéry and Marie-France Brière (director of variety and entertainment at France 2) suggested that he represent France in the Eurovision Song Contest 1993 with the song "Mama Corsica" composed by Valéry, a bilingual song mainly in French language but with some additional Corsican language lyrics. The song delivered the first rare occasion in which the Corsican language was heard at the Eurovision Song Contest. The next appearance of Corsican was after 18 years with France's entry in Eurovision Song Contest 2011 with Amaury Vassili's song "Sognu" which was completely in Corsican.

On 15 May 1993, Fiori performed "Mama Corsica" representing France in the Contest held that year in Green Glens Arena in Millstreet, Ireland. He was accompanied by an orchestra led by Christian Cravero. The accompaniment also included two [mandolin] players and two vocalists who joined him on stage throughout the song. Fiori finished fourth with a total of 121 points among 25 nations competing. The song obtained the coveted "douze points" (12 points) from the jury in Denmark and Portugal.

=== Debut albums and Notre-Dame de Paris (1994–2000) ===
In 1994, Fiori released his debut album titled Puisque c'est l'heure. In 1995, he released the self-financed Cœur à l'envers. He also appeared in a number of variety shows, notably La Chance aux chansons hosted by Pascal Sevran, interpreting on an occasion "Ma vie", an original song by Alain Barrière in his presence.

After a suggestion by Eddy Marnay, he auditioned for the musical Notre Dame de Paris with shows in Palais des Congrès de Paris. Convinced by his talent, Luc Plamondon offered him the role of Phoebus both onstage and in the recording studio for Notre-Dame de Paris. With Daniel Lavoie and Garou, he recorded the song "Belle" for the show. The song was released as a single, reaching number 1 on the French Singles Chart and the Wallonia French Belgian Charts. The song won "Best French Song of the Year" and the staging of Notre-Dame de Paris "Best French Show of the Year" during Victoires de la Musique in 1999.

Also in 1998, Patrick signed a contract with Sony and recorded his third album Prends Moi. He sang in the French soundtrack for Mulan singing in the role of Shang and in the French version of The Prince of Egypt (in French Le Prince d'Égypte) with songs in the role of Ramesses II.

In 1999, he took part in Les Enfoirés, participating for many years with them. In 2000, he decided to leave Notre-Dame de Paris to concentrate on his fourth album Chrysalide. The album contains a collaboration with Calogero in "Que tu reviennes". The same year, he appeared for the first time in the coveted Paris Olympia. He also wrote "Si je m'en sors" for Julie Zenatti.

=== Further successes (2000–present) ===
In 2002, Fiori released his fifth album, the self-titled Patrick Fiori with the first single from the album being "Marseille" dedicated to his hometown and written by Jacques Veneruso. Fiori had a collaboration with Jean-Jacques Goldman, who wrote four songs for him for the album, including "Je sais où aller".

In 2003, he toured France and Belgium with many dates and venues accompanied by his band, including guitarist Jacques Veneruso, keyboard player Pierre-Jean Scavino, guitarist André Hampartzoumian, percussionist Patrick Hampartzoumian, drummer Laurent Coppola, bass guitarist Patrick Dupont and bagpipes player and flautist Bruno Le Rouzic, with backing vocals by Agnès Hampartzoumian and Véronique Mavros.

2005 marked his new album Si on chantait plus fort with singles "Toutes les peines", "4 Mots sur un piano" and "Il paraît". His single "4 Mots sur un piano" was written by Jean-Jacques Goldman. Goldman and Christine Ricol accompany him in the song, which reached number in the French charts, staying there for two weeks and selling 150,000 copies. He also launched a new long tour from 2005 to 2007 to promote the album, including two shows at the l'Olympia de Paris on 13 and 14 January 2007.

In 2008, he released the album Les choses de la vie. The album includes remakes from various famous films including The Godfather (in French Le Parrain), The Umbrellas of Cherbourg (in French Les parapluies de Cherbourg), Borsalino, Manon des Sources, Forbidden Games (in French Jeux interdits), Mayrig and many others. The album went platinum. Singles from the album include "Liberta" from Borsalino with new Italian lyrics from Bernard Di Domebico.

This was followed up in 2009 by "Les Montagnes d'Arménie", a tribute to the Armenian genocide and taken from the soundtrack of the French Armenian-themed film Mayrig. Also in 2009, he recorded with the Budapest Philharmonic a duo with Tina Arena. The track "Si j'avais le temps" appears in Un autre univers an entirely French language album by Australian singer Arena. Fiori also engaged in a tour, taking him even to Moscow.

In 2010, he released L'instinct masculin. It included the single "Peut-être que peut-être" with lyrics and music by Jean-Jacques Goldman. The album also included "À la vie!", "Dieu qu'elle était belle!" and a collaboration with Johnny Hallyday in "Je viendrai te chercher". The album was accompanied by three tours: one acoustic in small venues, one electric in various Le Zénith French venues and one in big venues. In 2011, he released a live album recorded at Marseille's Dôme. The concert was available on CD and DVD.

In 2014, he released the album Choisir with a Valentines release of "Elles" written and composed by Goldman. The album had collaborations with Bénabar, Ariane Quatrefages, Robert Goldman, Jacques Veneruso, Eric Chemouny and Patrick Hampartzoumian. It was certified platinum. Patrick Fiori toured with a hundred dates between October 2014 and December 2015, appearing again at Le Zénith of Paris and at the Paris Olympia.

In 2015, he took part in a Corsican musical project Corsu Mezu Mezu containing 16 Corsican-based songs. He reinterpreted three songs in the album, "Corsica" with Patrick Bruel accompanied by a music video, "Ci hè dinù" with Chjami Aghjalesi and "Ô Corse île d'amour" with Antoine Ciosi.

In September 2017, he released his tenth album Promesse with the single "Où je vis" from the album. It contained two collaborations with Slimane and with French-Comorian singer and rapper Soprano. The Soprano collaboration "Chez nous (Plan d'Aou, Air Bel)" written by Jean-Jacques Goldman was a tribute to immigrants to France, particularly the immigrant inhabitants of Air Bel, a suburb of Marseille. It was accompanied by a music video where Fiori's parents appear in roles of Armenian immigrants. Additional writing collaborations included Arianne Quatrefages, Serge Lama and Ycare. Fiori went on tour in the summer of 2018, interpreting the album.

He has collaborated with a great number of artists. In addition to artists mentioned above, we can add Gérard Lenorman, Zucchero, Chico and the Gypsies, Anne Etchegoyen.

In 2015, he was a coach in season 2 of the French version of The Voice Kids joining Jenifer and Louis Bertignac. Jane, the finalist from his team won the season. In 2016 he was invited again to coach for season 3 alongside Jenifer and M. Pokora. He has since remained as a coach after that, making him the longest serving coach in the history of The Voice Kids. The winners of Seasons 4, 7, 8 and 11 were also members of his team.

== Personal life ==
Fiori had a relationship with Julie Zenatti for 8 years. They met during the musical Notre-Dame de Paris where they both had acting roles. The love relationship led to an artistic collaboration with Fiori and Zenatti, co-writing and co-composing for each other and for others. Zenatti's first and greatest success was "Si je m'en sors" written by Fiori. Despite separating, they remained friends and continued meeting each other. Between 1998 and 2000, Fiori was in a relationship with Canadian-Belgian singer Lara Fabian.

Patrick Fiori married Ariane Quatrefages in June 2008. Quatrefages was a beauty pageant contestant who was crowned Miss Rhône-Alpes 1999 and came fourth in the Miss France 2000 elections. The couple had their first child Sevan in 2009. In 2014, the couple had a second son. Ariane co-writes certain songs with her husband, Fiori.

=== Charities ===
Fiori is heavily involved in charities. He is a member of the Les Enfoirés the big charity ensemble since 1999, Fiori has persistently taken part in the show in aid of Restos du Cœur charity for a decade and a half.

Fiori actively supports many charities including Les enfants de la Terre, Solidarité inondations, Sidaction, Opération pièces jaunes, Les blouses roses, Téléthon, Sol En Si (Solidarité Enfants Sida), Les Vendanges du cœur, Les Étoiles de l'espoir, Televie, Association européenne contre les leucodystrophies (ELA) etc. He is a parrain (godfather) of Association Grégory Lemarchal, and on 7 January 2017, appeared in Le Zénith de Paris, directly broadcast on TF1 in the event Grégory Lemarchal, 10 ans après l'histoire continue, singing an unreleased new song written by Grégory Lemarchal titled "Pour mieux s'aimer" with all benefits going to the Association Grégory Lemarchal.

Fiori is also a parrain of the Corsica-based La Marie-Do against cancer and of the French Armenian Foundation.

== Discography ==
=== Studio albums ===
Year	Album	Peak positions				Sales
Year	Album	FR	BE (Fl)	BE (Wa)	CH	Sales
1994	Puisque c'est l'heure	–	–	–	–	
1995	Le Cœur à l'envers	–	–	–	–	
1998	Prends-moi	17	–	14	–	France: 2× Gold (200,000)
2000	Chrysalide	11	–	8	47	France: Gold (100,000)
2002	Patrick Fiori	6	–	8	37	France: 2× Gold (200,000)
2005	Si on chantait plus fort	4	–	14	59	France: Gold (100,000)
2008	Les Choses de la vie	7	–	7	–	France: Gold
2010	L'Instinct masculin	3	–	5	56	France: Platinum
2014	Choisir	2	112	4	26	France: Platinum
2017	Promesse	7	–	6	19	France: Gold
2020	Un air de famille	2	–	1	8	
2024	Le chant est libre	4	–	2	9	

=== Compilation albums ===
Year	Album	BE (Wa)	CH	Sales
2007	4 Mots	11	69	France: Gold

=== Live albums ===
Year	Album	FR	BE (Wa)
2011	L'instinct masculin – Live au Dôme de Marseille	24	12

=== Singles ===
Year	Single	FR	BE (Wa)	CH	SNEP	Album
1987	"Stephanie"	-	-	-		Non-album single
1989	"Le coeur a fleur d'amour"	-	-	-		Non-album single
1993	"Mama Corsica"	40	-	-		Puisque c'est l'heure
1994	"Une goutte d'eau"	-	-	-		Puisque c'est l'heure
1998	"Belle" (with Daniel Lavoie & Garou)	1	1	-	Diamond (750,000)	Notre dame de Paris
	"Prends-moi"	-	-	-		Prends-moi
	"Elle est"	9	12	-	Silver (125,000)	Prends-moi
1999	"J'en ai mis du temps"	38	-	-		Prends-moi
1999	"Terra umana"	48	-	-		Chrysalide
2000	"Que tu reviennes"	13	10	-		Chrysalide
2000	"Juste une raison encore"	45	13	-		Chrysalide
2002	"Marseille"	-	-	-		Patrick Fiori
2003	"Je sais où aller"	13	2^{A}	86		Patrick Fiori
2003	"Sans bruit"	-	-	-		Patrick Fiori
2005	"Il parait"	-	-	-		Si on chantait plus fort
2005	"Je ne serai jamais"	-	-	-		Si on chantait plus fort
2005	"Toutes les peines"	11	2^{A}	37		Si on chantait plus fort
2007	"4 Mots sur un piano" (with Jean-Jacques Goldman & Christine Ricol)	1	7	40	Silver (175,000)	Si on chantait plus fort
2010	"Peut-être que peut-être"	-	14	-		l'Instinct Masculin
2011	"Je viendrai te chercher (with Johnny Hallyday)"	-	17^{A}	-		l'Instinct Masculin
2011	"L'instinct masculin"	-	14^{A}	-		l'Instinct Masculin
2011	"À la vie!"	-	23^{A}	-		l'Instinct Masculin
2011	"L'écho des dimanches" (with Zucchero)	-	23^{A}	-		Non-album single
2012	"L'envie d'aimer" (with Julien Clerc, Catherine Lara & Liane Foly)	114	-	-		Non-album single
2012	"All By Myself"	140	-	-		Non-album single
2013	"Pachamama (la terre mere)" (with Anne Etchegoyen et le Chœur Aizkoa)	-	-	-		Les voix basques
2014	"Elles"	59	49	-		Choisir
2014	"J'espère que tu vas bien" (with Tommy)	-	8^{A}	-		
2015	"Corsica" (with Patrick Bruel)	27	43	-		
2017	"Pour mieux s'aimer"	10	-	-		Promesse
2017	"Où je vis"	32	15^{A}	-		Promesse
2017	"Chez nous (Plan d'Aou, Air Bel)" (with Soprano)	43	2^{A}	-		Promesse
2017	"Promesse" (with Slimane Nebchi)	175	-	-		Promesse
2018	"Les gens qu'on aime"	-	13^{A}	-		Promesse
2019	"Délé Yaman"	-	-	-		Non-album single
2021	"Si tu tombes" (with Soprano)	-	-	-		Non-album single

^{A}Charted on the Belgian Ultratip chart.

== Filmography ==
- 1998: Mulan: "Shang" (European French dubbed version)
- 1998: The Prince of Egypt: Ramesses II (Ramsès II) (European French dubbed version)

== Theatre ==
- 1998: Notre-Dame de Paris (musical) in the role of Captain Phoebus. From the musical, the song "Belle" interpreted by Patrick Fiori, Daniel Lavoie and Garou was chosen "Song of the Year" and the show "Show of the Year" in France.
- 2010: La Femme du boulanger of Marcel Pagnol, in the role of the shepherd (mise en scène by Alain Sachs, a French version of The Baker's Wife costarring with Michel Galabru, Philippe Caubère, Bernadette Lafont, Laëtitia Milot and others) It was rebroadcast on French TV station France 2, on 30 December 2010 from the Rueil-Malmaison theatre.

Preceded by Kali with Monté la riviè	France in the Eurovision Song Contest; 1993	Succeeded by Nina Morato with Je suis un vrai garçon
