= Julie Zenatti =

French singer (born 1981)

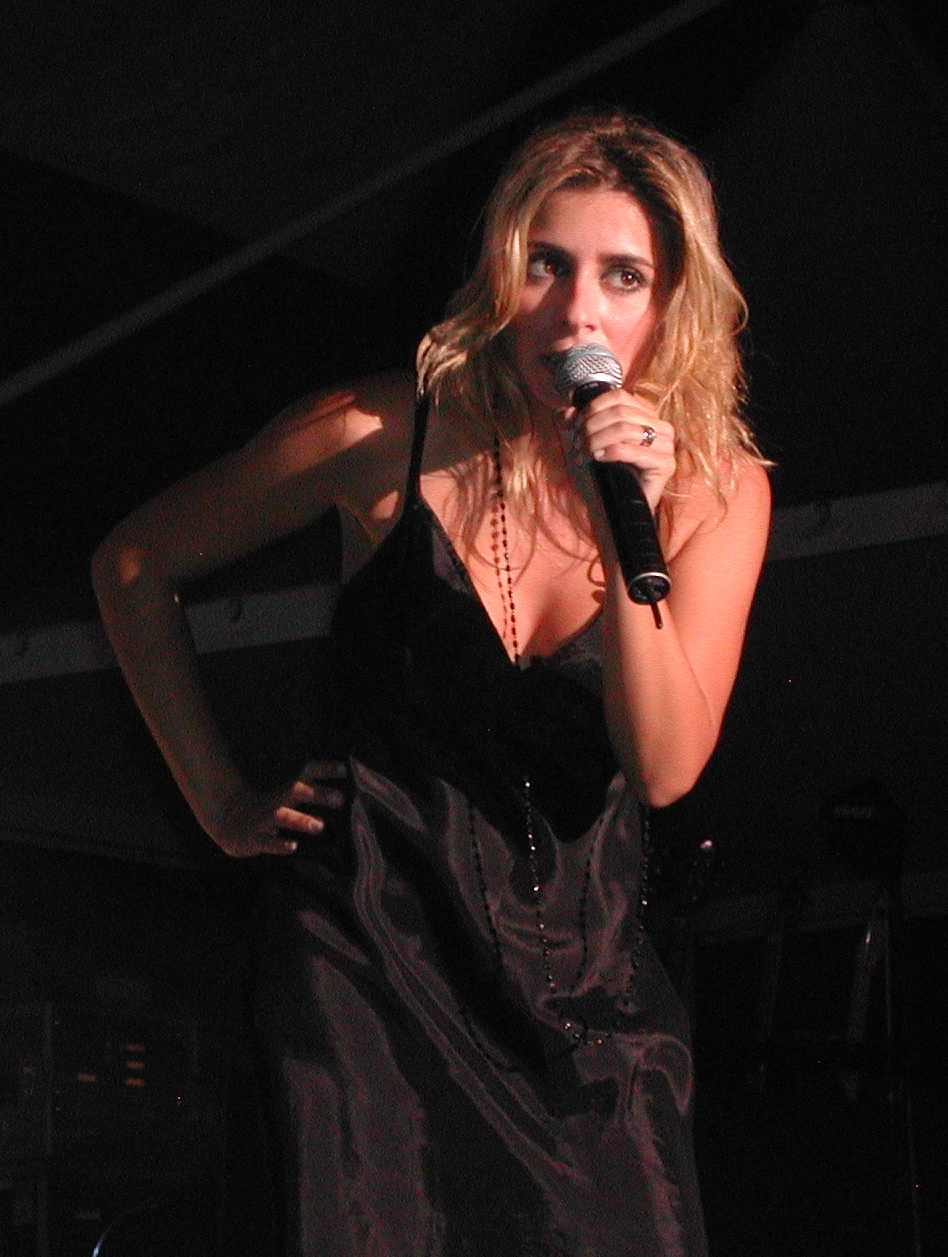
- Zenatti in 2005

Background information
- Born: 5 February 1981 (age 44)
- Origin: Paris, France
- Genres: French pop
- Occupation: Singer
- Years active: 1997–present
- Labels: Sony BMG; Columbia
- Website: www.juliezenatti.fr

Julie Zenatti (born 5 February 1981) is a French singer. She first played the role of Fleur-de-Lys and later Esmeralda on stage for the musical Notre-Dame de Paris.

== Personal life ==
Zenatti was born in 1981 in Paris. She is of Algerian, Italian and Jewish descent. Her father is an accomplished amateur pianist, and used to accompany her singing on the piano. Zenatti was involved with Notre-Dame de Paris co-star Patrick Fiori from 2002 to 2006 and the pair were engaged for two years. In 2009, she served as a judge on the reality competition X Factor France.

== Discography ==
=== Albums ===
Studio albums

Year	Album	Peak positions			Notes
Year	Album	FRA	BEL (Wa)	SWI	Notes
2000	Fragile	24	33	—	Track list: 1. Why; 2. Si je m'en sors 3. Tout s'en va 4. La vérité m'attire 5. Ce qu'il me reste de toi 6. Eldorado; 7. Pour y croire encore 8. Entre nous 9. Fragile; 10. Le Couloir de la vie 11. Toutes les douleurs 12. Si je m'en sors (remix)
2002	Dans les yeux d'un autre	30	—	76	Track list: 1. La vie fait tout ce qu'elle veut 2. Ma vie et la tienne 3. J'en doute 4. Si bas 5. Inconsolable; 6. Dans les yeux d'un autre 7. C'est du vent 8. Je glisse 9. Des lunes 10. Une femme qui sommeille 11. Mon voisin 12. T'emmener en amour 13. C'est moi qui sonne 14. Ensemble; 15. Le Goût des pommes (14 bis)
2004	Comme vous...	12	59	50	Track list: 1. Je voudrais que tu me consoles (I'd Like You to Console Me); 2. L'âge que j'ai (My Age); 3. Le sort du monde (The Fate of the World); 4. À quoi ça sert? (What Difference Does It Make?); 5. Couvre-moi (Cover Me); 6. On efface (One Erases); 7. Dans ces villes (In Those Towns); 8. Rendez-moi le silence (Give Me Back the Silence); 9. L'amour s'en fout (Love Doesn't Care); 10. Prends soin de moi (Take Care of Me); 11. Lis dans mes pensées (Read My Mind); 12. Des nouvelles (News); 13. Comme vous (Like You); 14. Mon amour (My Love); 15. L'amour suffit (14 bis)
2007	La boîte de Pandore	15	22	79	Track list: 1. Je voudrais une chanson (I would like a song); 2. La Boîte de Pandore (Pandora's Box); 3. Douce (Sweet); 4. Les cartons 5. (Tango) Princesse; 6. Interlude: Je voudrais une chanson 7. Si Le temps me permettait (If I Had The Time); 8. Jean Mineur; 9. Se souvenir (Remembering); 10. Julie ose (Julie Dares); 11. J'ai croisé le Diable (I Met The Devil); 12. Interlude: Je voudrais une chanson 13. Fais-moi confiance (Trust Me); 14. Amnésie (Amnesia); 15. Le chemin de l'école (The Way to School); 16. Interlude: Je voudrais une chanson 17. Face cachée (Hidden Side); 18. Belle la vie (Beautiful Life)
2010	Plus de Diva	30	45	–	Track list: 1. Appelez-moi Maria; 2. Le journal de Julie Z (Intro); 3. Venise 2037; 4. L'herbe tendre 5. Une tête à deux places 6. Comme une geisha 7. Sweden Syndrome; 8. Entre l'amour et le confort 9. Diva rouge 10. L'un souffre, l'autre s'ennuie 11. Les klaxons des mariages de juin 12. Une grande rousse aux yeux verts 13. Ma douleur est un cheval 14. Le journal de Julie Z (Outro)
2015	Blanc	13	19	70	Track list: 1. Là où nous en sommes 2. D'où je viens 3. La force des liens 4. Les amis 5. Blanc; 6. Pars sans rien dire 7. À l'ouest 8. La vérité 9. Presque; 10. Si tu veux savoir 11. La contemplation 12. Je ne t'en veux pas (with Grégoire); 13. Introverti; 14. L'instant de grâce (bonus track); 15. La fille du moi d'avant (bonus track); 16. À mon tour (bonus track)

Live albums

Year	Album	Peak positions
Year	Album	FRA
2013	Live piano voix – Quelque part...	154

=== Singles ===
Year	Single	Peak positions			Album
Year	Single	FRA	BEL (Wa)	SWI	Album
2001	"Si je m'en sors"	12	7	—	
2001	"Why"	70	13* (Ultratip)	—	
2003	"La vie fait ce qu'elle veut"	22	—	44	
2003	"Dans les yeux d'un autre"	38	—	—	
2004	"Je voudrais que tu me consoles"	12	16* (Ultratip)	45	
2007	"(Tango) Princesse"	10	31	—	
2014	"D'où je viens"	94	—	—	
2015	"Les amis"	103	5 (Ultratip)	—	
2015	"Pars sans rien dire"	—	—	—	
2016	"Zina (ici ou là-bas)"	151	—	—	
2020	"Paisiblement fou"	—	32	—	
2021	"Tout est plus pop"	—	47	—	

*Did not appear in the official Belgian Ultratop 50 charts, but rather in the bubbling under Ultratip charts.

Featured in

- 2007: "Pour que tu sois libre (La rose Marie Claire)" (Leslie / Anggun / Jennifer Mc Cray / Natasha St Pier / Elisa Tovati / Julie Zenatti) (reached FRA #21)
