= Luck Mervil =

Haitian-Canadian actor and singer

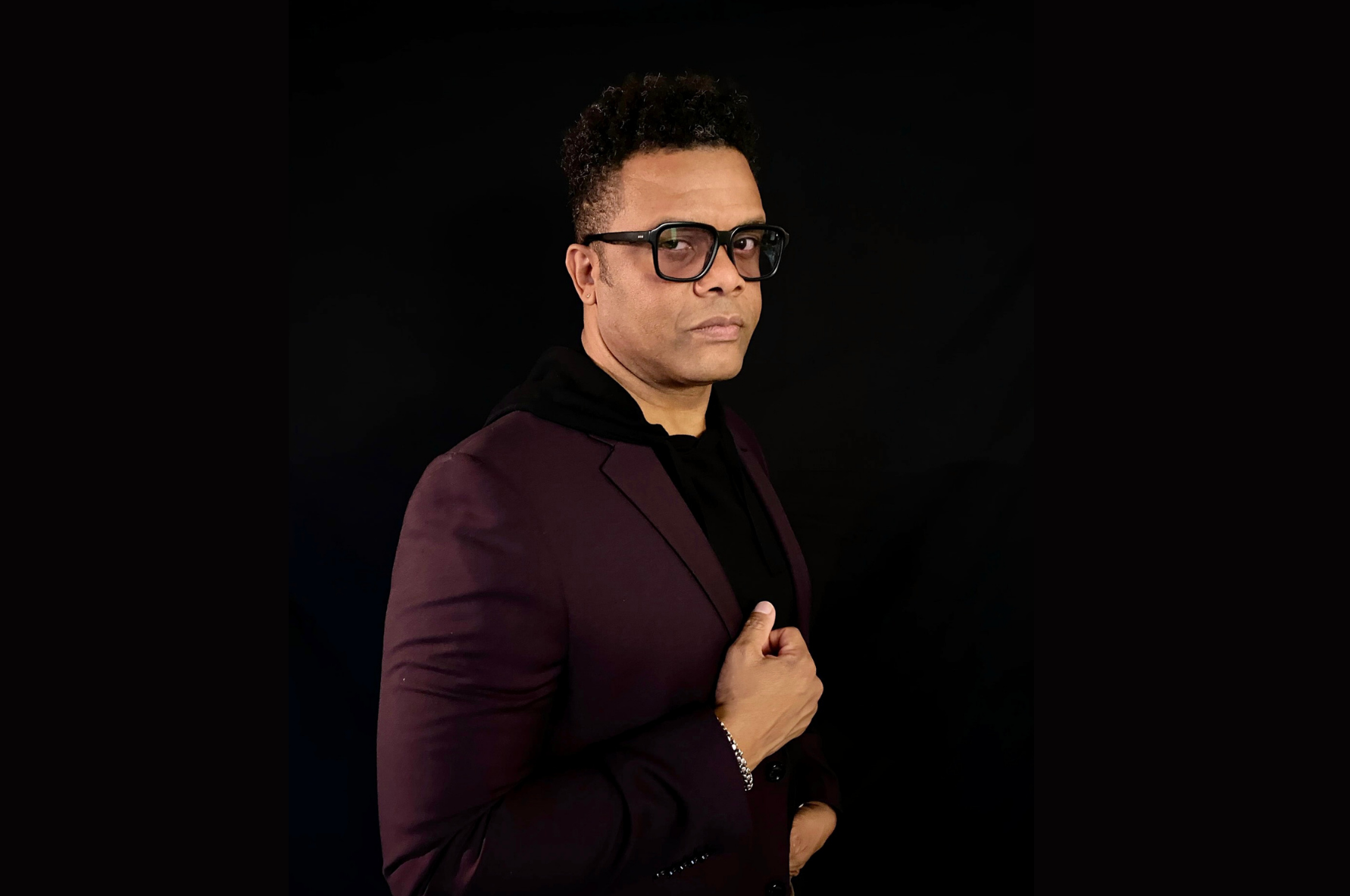

Background information
- Born: October 20, 1967 (age 58); Port-au-Prince, Haïti
- Genres: Soul, Kompa, Zouk, Afrobeat, Funk, Rap, Reggae, Pop-Rock
- Occupations: Singer-Songwriter, Actor, Producer, Entrepreneur
- Instruments: Vocals, Guitar, Piano
- Years active: 1992-present

Lucknerson Junior Mervil (born October 20, 1967), is a Haitian-Canadian singer-songwriter, actor and entrepreneur. He is known for his work in the French musical Notre-Dame-de-Paris, playing Clopin in the original French & English casts.

During the early 1990s, he achieved fame as the front man of pop-rock/funk band RudeLuck by winning L’Empire des futures stars, a Quebec talent show. He was approached by Luc Plamondon to star in a Quebec/French cast new musical called Notre-Dame-de-Paris. In 2001, he began his film career with the French movie Betty Fisher et autres histoires from director Claude Miller and has appeared in several other movies. He continued work in musical theatre, this time in Quebec with Génération Motown which was shown in Quebec City and Montreal. Mervil hosted the acclaimed boy/girl band contest Mixmania, on Vrak-TV, which earned him an award for his hosting skills. He hosted a public affairs television program Le 3950 on TV5.

Mervil is also known for his involvement in his community, in particular when Hurricane Jeanne hit his motherland in 2004. He shared the profit of his single Ti Peyi A with the CECI and Médécins du Monde Canada. That year, for his involvement and for bringing the Haitian and Quebec communities together, he was named Patriot of the Year by the Saint-Jean-Bapstiste Society. He released his creole album Ti Peyi A that year, featuring songs like Ti Mari & Mezanmi that are known as anthems in Haiti.

== Early life ==
Mervil was born in Port-au-Prince, Haiti. His family moved to Quebec, when he was four years old. He lived in New York between the ages of 12 and 17, and then returned to Quebec.

== Career ==
Mervil recorded several albums of reggae and rap music, including three with his band RudeLuck and later a self-titled solo album in 2000.

Mervil performed the role of Clopin in the original cast of the 1998 Notre-Dame de Paris musical. He made several subsequent television appearances, and in 2001 acted in the film Betty Fisher et autres histoires in 2001.

Mervil was a spokesperson for the Canadian Centre for International Studies and Cooperation. He founded the charitable organization, Vilaj vilaj.

== Personal life ==
Mervil is a father of 3.

Luck Mervil pleaded guilty in May 2018 to one charge of sexual exploitation for engaging in sexual relationship with a girl in 1996. The sexual contacts started when the girl was 17 and Mervil was 29, and continued after she turned 18. Despite age of consent in Canada being 14 years old at the time, the conviction stems from the fact Mervil was "in a position of authority," when the sexual contacts started while the girl was a minor. The judge, accepting the joint recommendation of the prosecution and defense, sentenced Mervil to 6 months to be served in the community, the first three of which under house arrest. In 2024, he filed a request to be removed from the sex offender registry.

In August 2025, Mervil was found guilty of sexually assaulting a 19-year old woman in Rimouski in 2000. He was alleged to have drugged and assaulted her in a hotel room after one of his concerts. Mervil pled not guilty and argued that it was a case of mistaken identity.

== Discography ==
- 1993 : RudeLuck (with RudeLuck)
- 1995 : Two (with RudeLuck)
- 1998 : Revolution (CD single, with RudeLuck)
- 1999 : Aller Simple
- 2000 : Luck Mervil
- 2003 : Soul
- 2009 : Ti peyi a

== Filmography ==
=== Movies ===
- 2001: Betty Fisher et autres histoires as François Diembele
- 2004: C'est pas moi, c'est l'autre as Dieudonné
- 2004: On the Verge of a Fever (French: Le Goût des jeunes filles) as actor and composer
- 2006: A Sunday in Kigali as Raphaël

=== Television ===
- 1997: Sauve qui peut! (series) as Christopher Étienne
- 1999: Notre-Dame de Paris (special) as Clopin
- 1998–2001: Piment Fort (recurring game show guest)
- 2002: The Mess Age (English performance, recorded in Montreal)
- 2003: MixMania (VRAK.TV), show host
