= Bruno Pelletier =

Canadian singer

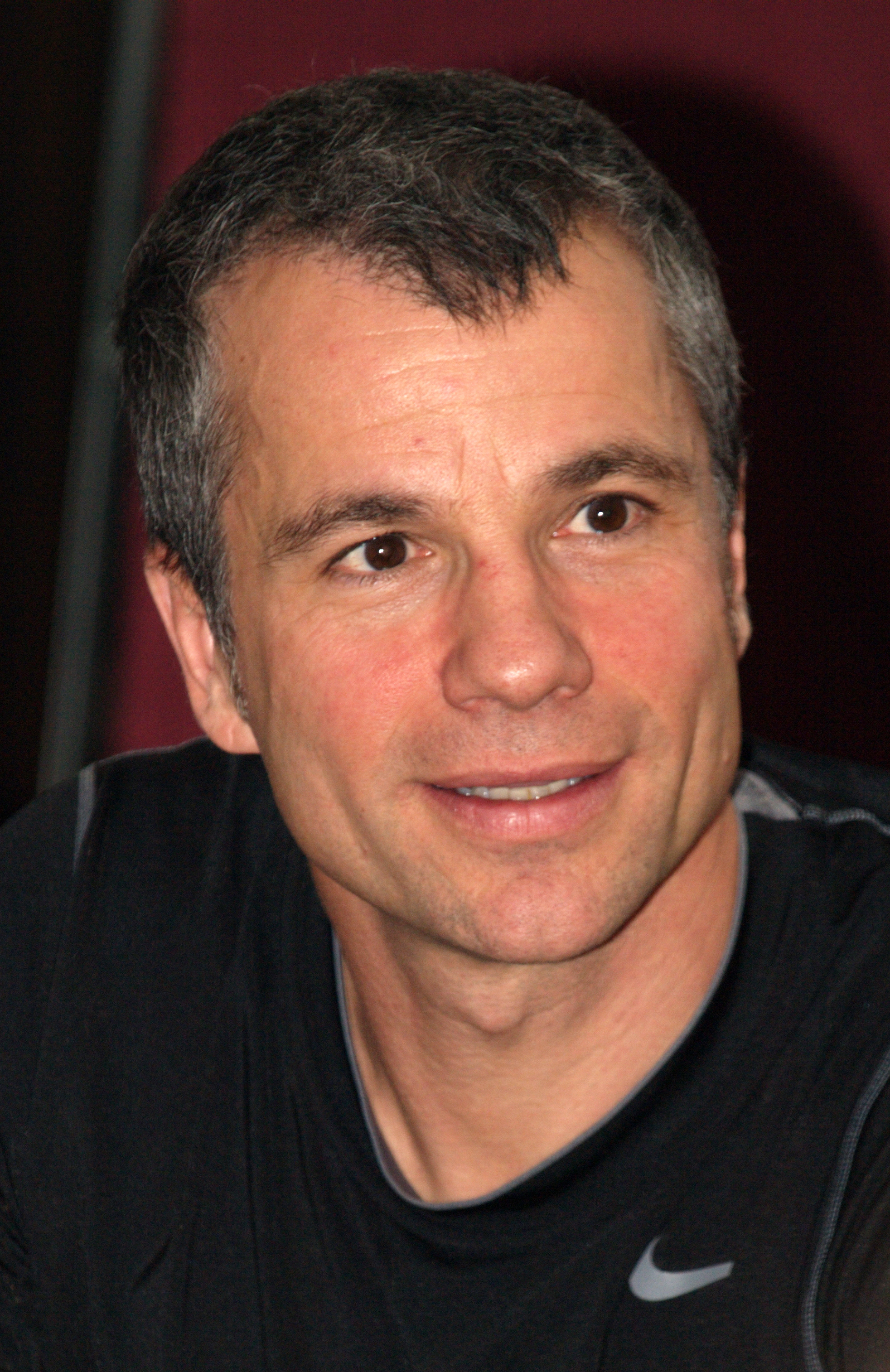
- Pelletier at the autograph-session in Moscow 6/11/2009

Background information
- Born: August 7, 1962 (age 64); Charlesbourg, Quebec City, Quebec, Canada
- Genres: French pop
- Occupation: Singer
- Instruments: Vocals, piano, Drums, Guitar
- Years active: 1992–present
- Website: www.brunopelletier.com

Bruno Pelletier (French pronunciation: [bʁyno pɛltje]; born August 7, 1962) is a Canadian singer, musician, and actor who is known as the “Genius of French Music”, and for playing Pierre Gringoire alongside Daniel Lavoie as Frollo, in English and French.

== Life ==
Pelletier was born in Charlesbourg, a suburb of Quebec City. In 1983 Pelletier performed in the bands Amanite and Sneak Preview, which sang in English. He later started a group called Pëll, singing in French. At 23 years old, he moved to Montreal, where he sang in bars. In 1989, he participated in the rock competition Envol, where he was awarded a special mention. In 1991, he had a role in the musical Vu d'en haut, presented at the Festival of the Montgolfières in Saint-Jean-sur-Richelieu. The following year, he joined the musical spectacle Les fous du rock'n'roll, in which he has performed forty times.

== Career ==
In 1992, he released his first self-titled album in October and played the role of James Dean in the rock opera La Légende de Jimmy, by Luc Plamondon and Michel Berger in November.

In the summer of 1994, Pelletier was invited to participate in the FrancoFolies de La Rochelle. In September, he returned to the Mogador Theater in Paris to perform in Starmania until the end of the year, which he performed 400 times. He also recorded his second album, Défaire l'Amour, released in 1995. In 1997, his third studio album, Miserere, surpassed 200,000 copies sold. He also won the Félix Award for male singer of the year. At the same time, he appeared on the Quebec TV series Omertà II.

Between January and August 1998, Pelletier performed more than 100 concerts in Quebec. After that, he went to Paris to play the role of Gringoire in the Luc Plamondon-Riccardo Cocciante musical Notre-Dame de Paris. In 1999, Pelletier released his fourth album, D'autres rives, simultaneously in Europe and Quebec. It was one of the best-selling Francophone albums in Canada in 2000. During this period, he also performed the role of Gringoire in the English-language production of Notre-Dame de Paris in London. In 2001 he released a live album, Sur Scène. In August 2002 he released his sixth album, Un monde à l'envers.

During this period, Pelletier worked with the prestigious Montreal Symphony Orchestra for the series Les Week-ends pop de l'OSM. He united with the orchestra a second time in December 2002 to present a Christmas series, recorded as the album Concert de Noël.

In 2006, Pelletier played the leading role in the musical Dracula – Entre l'amour et la mort, a modern retelling of the Dracula story. The cast album was released in 2005. Pelletier released a jazz album titled Bruno Pelletier et le GrosZorchestre on September 11, 2007. He released his album titled Microphonium on February 3, 2009.

In 2011, Pelletier played the role of Napoléon in Michel Rivard's musical, Les Filles de Caleb.

On September 25, 2012, Pelletier released his eleventh studio album, entitled Rendus Là. In 2022 he reprised his best known role of the poet Gringoire in the French tour of Notre-Dame de Paris in Canada, reuniting alongside Daniel Lavoie as Frollo.

== Discography ==
=== Albums ===
- Bruno Pelletier (1992)
- Defaire l'amour (1995)
- Miserere (1997)
- D'autres rives (1999)
- Sur scène (2001)
- Un monde à l'envers (2002)
- Concert de Noël (2003)
- Dracula – Entre l'amour et la mort (2005)
- Bruno Pelletier et le GrosZorchestre (2007)
- Microphonium (2009)
- Rendus Là (2012)
- Musique et cinéma (2014)
- Regarde autour (2016)
- Sous Influences (2019)
- Car le temps est venu (2022)

=== Singles ===
- Dans ma tête (August 7, 2022)

== Awards and distinctions ==
=== Félix Awards ===
- 2008 Album de l'année - Jazz interprétation (Bruno Pelletier et le GrosZorchestre)
- 2000 Interprète masculin de l'année (vote populaire)
- 2000 Album de l'année - Pop-Rock (D'autres rives)
- 1999 Interprète masculin de l'année (vote populaire)
- 1999 Spectacle de l'année interprète (Notre-Dame de Paris)
- 1999 Album de l'année Meilleur Vendeur (Notre-Dame de Paris)
- 1999 Artiste québécois s'étant le plus illustré hors Québec: Notre-Dame de Paris
- 1999 Album de l'année - Populaire: Notre-Dame de Paris - L'Intégrale
- 1999 Chanson populaire de l'année: Le temps des cathédrales - Interprète: Bruno Pelletier
- 1998 Album de l'année Meilleur Vendeur (Miserere)
- 1998 Album de l'année Pop Rock (Miserere)
- 1998 Spectacle de l'année interprète (Miserere, la tournée)
- 1998 Album de l'année Populaire (Notre-Dame de Paris)
- 1997 Interprète masculin de l'année (vote populaire)
- 1994 Spectacle de l'année interprète (Starmania)
- 1993 Spectacle de l'année interprète (La légende de Jimmy)

=== Victoires de la Musique ===
- 1998 Pop album of the year (Notre-Dame de Paris)
- 1994 Musical show of the year (Starmania)

=== World Music Awards ===
- 2000 World Best Selling French Recording Artist/Group (Notre-Dame de Paris)
- 1999 World Best Selling French Recording Artist/Group (Notre-Dame de Paris)

=== Certifications ===
- 2006: Dracula - Entre l'amour et la mort (Billet or, 50 000 spectateurs)
- 2003: Concert de Noël (Or/Platine)
- 2001: Sur scène (Gold)
- 2001: The D'autres rives tour (Billet or, 50 000 spectateurs)
- 2000: The D'autres rives tour (Billet argent, 25 000 spectateurs)
- 1999: D'autres rives (Gold) Canada
- 1999: The Miserere tour (Billet argent, 25 000 spectateurs)
- 1998: Miserere (Double Platinum) Canada
- 1998: Notre-Dame de Paris (Gold/Platinum/Double Platinum/Triple Platinum/Quadruple Platinum) Canada
- 1998: Notre-Dame de Paris (Diamond Disc) France
- 1998: Le temps des Cathédrales (Gold) France
- 1997: Miserere: (Gold/Platinum) Canada
- 1994: Starmania Mogador 94 (Platinum) France

=== Other awards and achievements ===
- 2009: Prix SOBA - Jazz Artist or Group of the Year (Bruno Pelletier et le GrosZorchestre)
- 2001: Talent France Bleu 2000/2001, awarded by the France Bleu radio network
- 1998: Le Palmarès - "Aime" breaks the record of 10 consecutive weeks in first position
- 1996: Trophy SOCAN - "En manque de toi" 1st position of Palmarès

=== Nominations ===
- 2009 Félix Spectacle de l'année - Interprète (Microphonium)
- 2003 Félix Interprète masculin de l'année (vote populaire)
- 2003 Félix Album de l'année - Pop-Rock (Un monde à l'envers)
- 2003 Félix Site internet de l'année (www.brunopelletier.com)
- 2003 Félix Spectacle de l'année - Auteur-compositeur-interprète (Un monde à l'envers)
- 2001 Félix Interprète masculin de l'année (vote populaire)
- 2001 Félix Site internet de l'année (www.brunopelletier.com)
- 2001 Félix Album de l'année - Meilleur vendeur (Sur scène)
- 2001 Félix Album de l'année - Pop-Rock (Sur scène)
- 2000 Félix Album de l'année - Meilleur vendeur (D'autres rives)
- 2000 Félix Spectacle de l'année - Interprète (La tournée D'autres rives)
- 2000 Félix Spectacle de l'année - Interprète (La dernière de Céline)
- 2000 Félix Artiste québécois s'étant le plus illustré hors Québec - (Notre-Dame de Paris)
- 1999 Génie Meilleur variété: Bruno Pelletier, Plein Chant
- 1998 Félix Vidéoclip "Aime"
- 1998 Félix Interprète masculin
- 1998 Félix Chanson Populaire "Aime"
- 1997 Juno Award Best selling Francophone album "Miserere"
- 1997 Juno Award Male vocalist
- 1996 Félix Interprète masculin
- 1996 Félix album Pop Rock "Défaire l'amour"

== La Fondation québécoise du cancer ==
Pelletier is the spokesperson for La Fondation québécoise du cancer (2012)
