= Daniel Lavoie =

Canadian musician (born 1949)

Daniel Lavoie OC
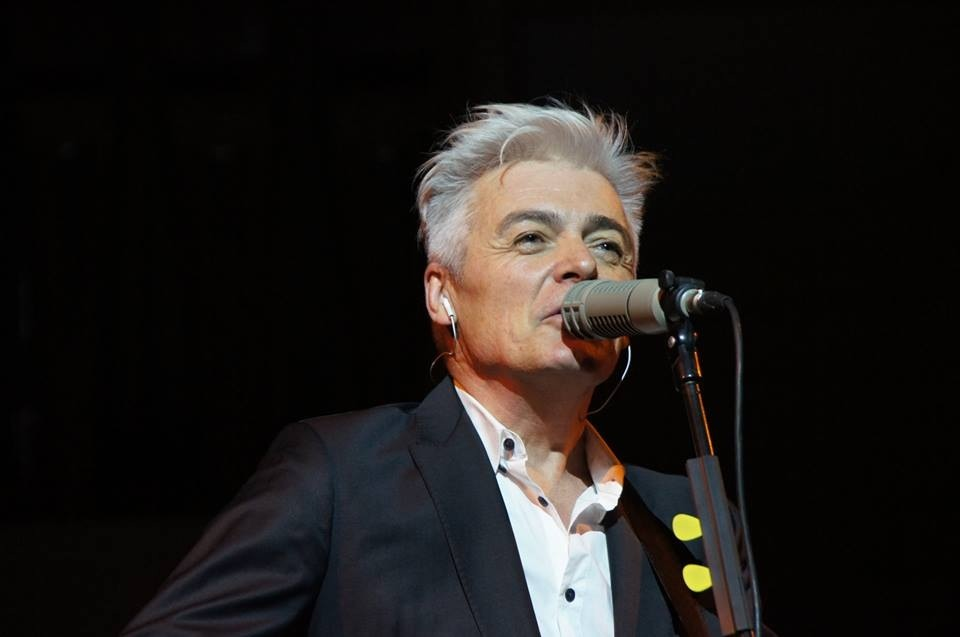
- Lavoie performs in Moscow, Russia, on October 19, 2013.

Background information
- Born: Daniel Joseph-Hubert-Gérald Lavoie; March 17, 1949 (age 77); Dunrea, Manitoba, Canada
- Genres: Pop; rock; French pop; adult contemporary; musicals
- Occupations: Musician; singer; composer; producer; actor; radio host
- Instruments: Piano; guitar
- Years active: 1970–present
- Website: daniellavoie.ca

Daniel Lavoie OC (French pronunciation: [danjɛl lavwa]; born Daniel Joseph-Hubert-Gérald Lavoie, March 17, 1949) is a Canadian musician, actor, and singer best known for his song "Ils s'aiment" and the role of Frollo in musical Notre-Dame de Paris. He releases albums and performs on stage in Canada and France and tours in Canada and Europe.

== Career ==
=== Music ===
Lavoie's signature.

In 1967, Daniel Lavoie won the CBC's competition for singer-songwriters, in the television program, "Jeunesse Oblige". Soon after that he began touring Quebec's music clubs with groups (Spectre, then Dieu de l'amour vous aime). At that time he changed his name from Gérald to Daniel, his birth name. In 1973 Daniel Lavoie recorded his first single, "Marie connue", and in 1974, his second, "S'endormir pour une rose". His first album A court terme (1975) had moderate success. One of the songs from this albums, "J'ai quitté mon île" became especially popular in France and also in Portugal and Brazil. In 2009 "J'ai quitté mon île" was selected by CBC Radio listeners among the top 49 Canadian songs in all genres that best defined the country's image for Barack Obama, to be presented to him on an iPod for his inauguration. The second album, Berceuse pour un Lion (1977) was well received in Quebec and contained several hits ("Dans le temps des animaux", "La Vérité sur la vérité", "Berceuse pour un lion"), but it was the third album, the Rehjan Rancourt / Scott Richards produced Nirvana bleu (1979) that brought Daniel Lavoie true recognition in Quebec. He toured all over Quebec and also performed in France (Théâtre Montparnasse in Paris in 1980). His popularity as a live performer was growing. In 1980 he received his first Félix Award for the best male singer of the year. Many more were to follow. Along with Brian Plummer, Dwayne Ford, and Guidonna Lee, Lavoie was one of the first pop and rock arists signed to Sefel Records. In 1981, Daniel Lavoie released his first English-language album Cravings as well as his fourth French-language album Aigre doux.

The year 1984 was a turning point in Daniel Lavoie's career with the release of his album Tension Attention (European title Ils s'aiment). One of the songs from this album, "Ils s'aiment" became especially popular and its single sold 2 million copies. It has been translated into several languages and covered by dozens of performers, among them Ana Belén ("Ellos se aman", in Spanish), Richard Cocciante (in Italian and Spanish), Diane Dufresne (in French), Paulo Gonzo ("Ridiculous Love", in English), Ramses Shaffy ("Regenboog", in Dutch). "Ils s'aiment" and "Tension Attention" brought Daniel Lavoie multiple awards both in Quebec and in France. The same year Daniel created his solo concert show Hôtel des rêves which he presented both in Quebec and in Europe.

Lavoie's next album, Vue sur la mer (1987) was another success. The release was followed by 5 nights engagement at the Olympia theatre in Paris, and later a 21-date tour throughout Europe. More awards followed, and in the spring of 1988 for three months Lavoie performed his show Hôtel des rêves at the Théâtre Outremont in Montreal. The 1990 album Long Courrier (European title Chanson de la Terre) included "Qui sait", "Le pape du rap", and "Jours de plaine". A study conducted in the early 1990s placed Lavoie among most highly respected by their peers French-Canadian singer-songwriters.

In 1992 Lavoie participated in Catherine Lara's symphonic rock-musical Sand et les Romantiques, performing the part of Eugène Delacroix. The same year he released another English-language album, Here in the heart. He also appeared in an episode of the American soap opera General Hospital as himself performing his own song "Weak for Love". Lavoie's next and final English-language album Woman to Man appeared in 1994.

In 1995 Lavoie released a new album Ici (European title Où la route mène) which introduced new hits such as "Où la route mène", "Je pensais pas", and "Je suis une rivière". Two albums for children followed: Le Bébé Dragon (1996) and Le Bébé Dragon vol. 2 (1997). Live album of Lavoie's best hits along with never-before performed pieces, Live au Divan Vert (European title Le meilleur de Daniel Lavoie) was recorded in 1997.

In 1998 Lavoie was cast as priest Frollo in Richard Cocciante and Luc Plamondon's new musical Notre-Dame de Paris, which was based on the eponymous novel by Victor Hugo, and has been performing the role since 2016. The musical became very successful ("Notre-Dame De Paris" won world's best-selling artist/group for 1998 at the World Music Awards on May 5, 1999) Albums were sold by the millions (certified triple-platinum by CRIA for sales of more than 300,000 copies), and for seven months Daniel sang the part of Frollo in front of sold-out crowds of the Palais des Congrès in Paris. He continues to do it today. After that he also participated in the show's tour in France, as well as the Quebec production and the English version in London, in 2000. The song "Belle", which he performed with Garou and Patrick Fiori became enormously popular (in 1998 3 million copies of this song were sold in Europe, where it was no. 1 for 30 weeks.)

In 2002 Lavoie was cast in another musical in Paris, this time Le Petit Prince by Richard Cocciante and Elisabeth Anais, based on Antoine de St-Exupéry's book. He performed the part of the Pilot until April 2003.

The new album Comédies humaines was released in 2004 and included hits like "Violoncelle" and "Bénies Soient Les Femmes". A tour in France and Quebec followed. The same year Lavoie released a storybook for children illustrated by Oksana Kemarskaya Roulé Boulé: Je suis une boule qui roule, accompanied by an album of the same name that consisted of selections from the two Bébé dragon albums. In 2011 this work was selected along with several other books for use as elementary school teaching texts in Quebec and republished with a teaching aide within a series L'école de La Montagne secrète.

In February 2005 Lavoie participated in a stage revival of Nelligan, an opera by André Gagnon based on the works and biography of Émile Nelligan, Quebec's late 19th-century poet. The show, in which Lavoie sang the part of the Old Nelligan was recorded in a live album.

The album Docteur Tendresse appeared in 2007. It included songs like "Docteur Tendresse", "La voilà notre armée" (to the lyrics by Allain Leprest).

In 2008 Lavoie accepted an invitation to participate in a project that united music with the poetry of Gaston Miron, Quebec's 20th-century poet : the album Douze homme rapaillés, a collection of musical settings of Miron's poems by Gilles Bélanger and performed by various Quebec's singers-songwriters. The second volume of this work came out in 2010 (Douze homme rapaillés – volume 2). The rare stage performances of Douze homme rapaillés won both critical and popular acclaim. The third installment of the project, the disc La symphonie rapaillée presenting a selection of the songs from the previous two albums, this time accompanied by an orchestra, was released in April 2014.

Beginning in December 2010 Lavoie participated in a series of the concert versions of Notre-Dame de Paris which reunited the original cast. These shows were presented in Kyiv, Moscow, Saint-Petersburg, Paris and Beirut. He was joined with Bruno Pelletier. In 2011 Lavoie released J'écoute la radio, an album of newly arranged hits plus a new song (J'écoute la radio). A new concert show took Lavoie on a tour that lasted for almost 2 years (until Spring 2013) all over Quebec, as well as in France, Russia and Ukraine.

On March 25, 2014 the French production company Le Chant du Monde (a Harmonia mundi label) released a new disc, Daniel Lavoie: La Licorne captive – Un projet musical de Laurent Guardo. This musical project exploring classical myths and legends features Daniel Lavoie as a vocalist performing songs written for him by a Canadian composer-songwriter Laurent Guardo, accompanied by an ensemble of early music and ethnic instruments. In 2014-2015 Lavoie and Guardo presented live shows of the album in Paris. and in Quebec.

On July 1, 2014 Daniel Lavoie participated in the official Canada Day on Parliament Hill in Ottawa evening show as one of its featured performers, representing his native Manitoba.

Daniel Lavoie's new album titled Mes longs voyages was released in September 2016. Produced with Guy St-Onge, a collaborator of his friend, Bruno Pelletier, his gringoire, this album comprises both original songs as well as covers of songs by Léo Ferré, Alain Bashung, Allain Leprest and Félix Leclerc. A Canadian concert tour Mes longs voyages followed in February–March 2017, and in the spring of 2018. One of the concerts took place at the 2017 Montréal en lumière festival, which named Lavoie President of Honor.

Since November 2016 Daniel Lavoie has been part of the cast of the revival of the musical Notre Dame de Paris reprising his role of Frollo in the Palais des Congrès in Paris, followed by the ongoing tour of France and other countries.

He currently resides in Montreal.

==== Collaborations ====
Lavoie often collaborates with his colleagues, by recording duos or solo tracks for their albums. Some examples of such collaboration are albums "Chez Leprest, vol. 1" (2007), "Leprest symphonique" (2011), Dominica Merola's "Appassionata" (2010), Liona Boyd's "The return... To Canada with love…" (2013), book+disc set "Chats de Paris" by Gérard Beauchamp (2009), followed by "Chats de Montréal" (2011), Valérie Carpentier's "L'été des orages" (2013) et al.

Lavoie also produces musical albums by other performers, like Marie-Jo Thério, Louise Forestier, Hart-Rouge Band, and Gilles Vigneault (the album Vivre debout, 2014).

=== Film and television work ===
Lavoie acted in a 1991 Canadian film by Jean Pierre Lefebvre, The Fabulous Voyage of the Angel (Le fabuleux voyage de l'ange), for which he also wrote the musical score. He received a Genie Award nomination for Best Original Song, for "Quand tu partiras".

In 2002 Lavoie appeared in a Canadian TV film directed by Claude Fournier The Book of Eve, alongside Claire Bloom. In 2004 Daniel Lavoie starred as Quebec's singer-songwriter Félix Leclerc in the mini-series Félix Leclerc, directed by Fournier for Canadian and French television. In addition Lavoie has recorded his own musical tribute to Leclerc, an album Moi, mon Félix (2005).

In 2012 Lavoie appeared in a cameo role in a French TV mini-series Antigone 34, created by Brice Homs and Alexis Nolent.

In addition to acting in films, he has also written songs and music scores for a number of films.

In 2019 and 2020 Lavoie participated in the Canadian Film Festival in Dieppe as a jury member (2019) and as jury president (2020).

=== Poetry ===
In 2011, Lavoie published a book of poems and poetic essays, Finutilité (Saint-Boniface : Les Éditions des Plaines) In 2014 a Russian translation of the book was published in Russia under the title Пустонечность (Saint-Petersburg : Polifarm, 2014).

In the Spring of 2013 Lavoie became the official representative of the Maison de la Poésie de Montréal Spring fundraising campaign.

Daniel's second book of poetry, Particulités was published in 2015.

=== Radio ===
For three years (from June 2010 through June 2013) Daniel Lavoie was hosting his own radio show, Lavoie libre, on the Espace Musique channel of Radio Canada. The show featured music in a variety of styles and of many ethnic origins as well as poetry by Francophone poets, mostly from North America, read on the air by the host himself.

== Awards ==
- 1980 Interprète masculin de l'année – Gala de l'ADISQ
- 1981 Interprète masculin de l'année – Gala de l'ADISQ
- 1984 Chanson de l'année Tension Attention – Gala de l'ADISQ; Interprète masculin de l'année – Gala de l'ADISQ; Album de l'année Auteur et/ou compositeur-interprète Tension Attention – Gala de l'ADISQ
- 1985 Midem d'or décerné pour la chanson Ils s'aiment; Félix de l'Artiste s'étant le plus illustré hors Québec; Victoire de la musique du Meilleur album francophone Tension Attention
- 1986 Recipient of the Médaille Jacques-Blanchet; recipient of the prix Wallonie-Québec
- 1987 Victoires de la musique Meilleur album francophone Vue sur la mer; Récipiendaire du Trophée Renonciat (attribuée par la Communauté radiophonique des programmes de langue française); Félix de l'Artiste s'étant le plus illustré hors Québec
- 1988 Victoire de l'album francophone de l'année Vue sur la mer
- 1989 Knight of the Order of La Pléiade
- 1990 Félix de l'Album pop-rock de l'année Long Courrier – Gala de l'ADISQ
- 1991 Prix Socan, Musique populaire Qui sait
- 1992 Prix Miroir de la Chanson d'expression française au Festival d'été de Québec
- 1993 Member of the l'Ordre des francophones d'Amérique
- 1996 Prix SOCAN for the songs Ils s'aiment, Tension attention and Où la route mène
- 1997 Félix de l'Album pour enfants de l'année (Le Bébé dragon) – Gala de l'ADISQ
- 1997 Prix SOCAN for the songs Je voudrais voir New York and Lolita
- 1999 Victoires de la musique, Spectacle de l'année Notre-Dame-de-Paris; Victoires de la musique, Chanson de l'année for Belle; World Music Award for World's best-selling French artist (the cast of Notre Dame de Paris)
- 1999 Prix SOCAN for the song La danse du smatte
- 2000 Prix SOCAN for the song Des milliards de choses
- 2006 Inducted into the Canadian Association of Broadcasters' Broadcast Hall of Fame in the Music Star category
- 2009 Prix SOCAN for Daniel Lavoie (composer), Louise Forestier (lyricist) and Eric Lapointe (singer) in the category Popular song for the song 1500 miles
- 2009 Prix Robert Charlebois pour son rayonnement à l'étranger – Fondation SPACQ (Société professionnelle des auteurs et des compositeurs du Québec) – The Robert Charlebois prize for influence abroad awarded by the Professional Association of Quebec authors and composers (SPACQ)
- 2010 Spectacle de l'année – interprète – Gala de l'ADISQ (for 12 hommes rapaillés)
- 2011 Album de l'année – folk contemporain – Gala de l'ADISQ (for Douze hommes rapaillés chantent Miron, volume 2 : Artistes variés)
- 2012 Spectacle de l'année – interprète – Gala de l'ADISQ (for Douze hommes rapaillés (deuxième édition) : Artistes variés)
- 2014 Album de l'année – réinterprétation – Gala de l'ADISQ (for La symphonie rapaillée : Artistes variés)
- 2015 Prix SOCAN (Category SOCAN Classics) for the song La Villa de Ferdinando Marcos sur la mer
- 2022: Canadian Songwriters Hall of Fame
- 2024: Order of Canada
- 2026: Governor General's Performing Arts Award
