= Anastasia (soundtrack) =

Soundtrack of 1997 Fox Animation Studios film Anastasia

Anastasia: Music from the Motion Picture

Soundtrack album by various artists
- Released: October 28, 1997
- Recorded: 1996–1997
- Genre: Musical theater, classical
- Label: Atlantic
- Producer: David Newman; Lynn Ahrens; Stephen Flaherty

Don Bluth Music of Films chronology
The Pebble and the Penguin (1995)	Anastasia (1997)	Titan A.E. (2000)

Singles from Anastasia Original Soundtrack
- 1. "At the Beginning" Released: October 21, 1997; 2. "Journey to the Past" Released: November 6, 1997

Professional ratings
Review scores
Source	Rating
Allmusic	3/5 stars
Filmtracks	3/5 stars

Anastasia: Music from the Motion Picture is the soundtrack for the 1997 Don Bluth/20th Century Fox animated film Anastasia. It contains songs from the film written by Lynn Ahrens and Stephen Flaherty, selections of the original score composed by David Newman, and performed by Liz Callaway, Jim Cummings, Jonathan Dokuchitz and Kelsey Grammer, among others, and features singles by Aaliyah and Deana Carter, and a duet with Richard Marx and Donna Lewis, along with tracks from the film's score composed by Newman. It was released on October 28, 1997, on CD and audio cassette.

The songs "Journey to the Past" and "Once Upon a December" were given nominations from the Academy Awards and Golden Globes. Newman also received his first Oscar nomination for the score. The single "At the Beginning" managed to position number forty-five on the Billboard Hot 100, and also to number two on the Billboard Adult Contemporary chart.

== Track listing ==
All songs are composed by Stephen Flaherty with lyrics by Lynn Ahrens. All scores are composed by David Newman. Tracks 11 and 14 contain performances while also being scores.

No.	Title	Recording artist(s)	Length
1.	"A Rumor in St. Petersburg"	Jonathan Dokuchitz, Kelsey Grammer	3:25
2.	"Journey to the Past"	Liz Callaway	2:55
3.	"Once Upon a December"	Liz Callaway	2:48
4.	"In the Dark of the Night"	Jim Cummings	3:21
5.	"Learn to Do It"	Jonathan Dokuchitz, Kelsey Grammer, Liz Callaway	2:36
6.	"Learn to Do It (Waltz Reprise)"	Kelsey Grammer	1:45
7.	"Paris Holds the Key (To Your Heart)"	Jonathan Dokuchitz, Bernadette Peters	3:02
8.	"At the Beginning"	Richard Marx, Donna Lewis	3:40
9.	"Journey to the Past"	Aaliyah	4:04
10.	"Once Upon a December"	Deana Carter	3:34
11.	"Prologue" (score)	Angela Lansbury, Lacey Chabert	6:23
12.	"Speaking of Sophie" (score)		2:36
13.	"The Nightmare" (score)		3:05
14.	"Kidnap and Reunion" (score)	Liz Callaway, Angela Lansbury	4:29
15.	"Reminiscing with Grandma" (score)		3:17
16.	"Finale" (score)		2:59

Bonus track
No.	Title	Recording artist(s)	Length
17.	"Viaje Tiempo Atrás" (Journey to the Past) (Latin American Spanish version)	Thalía	3:07

== Personnel ==
- Aaliyah – Performer, Finger Snaps
- Lynn Ahrens – Producer
- Brooks Almy – Vocals, Ensemble
- Eric Altenburger – Design
- Alexander Areteds – Mixing Assistant
- Patricia P. Azar – Translation
- Randall Barlow – Programming
- Tom Bender – Assistant Engineer
- Ellen Bernfeld – Vocals, Ensemble
- Douglas Besterman – Orchestration
- Judy Blazer – Vocals, Ensemble
- Jeff Blumenkrantz – Vocals, Ensemble
- Edwin Bonilla – Percussion
- Ted Brunetti – Vocals, Ensemble
- Glen Burtnik – Vocals, Ensemble
- Liz Callaway – Performer
- Deana Carter – Performer
- Sue Ann Carwell – Vocals (background)
- Lacey Chabert - Performer
- Sean Chambers – Engineer
- Vivian Cherry – Vocals, Ensemble
- Robin Clark – Vocals, Ensemble
- Victoria Clark – Vocals, Ensemble
- Jim Cummings – Performer
- Tony Dawsey – Mastering
- Darius de Haas – Vocals, Ensemble
- Madeleine Doherty – Vocals, Ensemble
- Jonathan Dokuchitz – Performer
- Anne Dudley – Piano
- Robert DuSold – Vocals, Ensemble
- Gregg Edelman – Vocals, Ensemble
- Emilio Estefan Jr. – Producer
- Alfred Figueroa – Assistant Engineer
- Steve Fitzmaurice – Engineer
- Stephen Flaherty – Producer, Vocal Arrangement
- Marty Frasu – Synthesizer
- Al Fritsch – Vocals, Ensemble
- Juan Carlos García – Translation
- Javier Garza – Engineer, Mixing
- Jim Gilstrap – Vocals (background)
- Kyle Gordon – Vocals, Ensemble
- Kelsey Grammer – Performer
- Mick Guzauski – Mixing
- Nikki Harris – Vocals (background)
- Reggie Hamilton – Bass
- Daniel Hamuy – Orchestration
- Mike Harvey – Vocals, Ensemble
- Darren Higman – Executive Producer
- Trevor Horn – Producer
- Jan Horvath – Vocals, Ensemble
- Henry Jackman – Keyboards, Programming, String Arrangements
- Randy Jackson – Bass
- John Jellison – Vocals, Ensemble
- Xandy Jenko – Orchestration
- Marlena Jeter – Vocals (background)
- Jeanette Jurado – Shaker
- Craig Kallman – Executive Producer
- Kenny Karen – Vocals, Ensemble
- Curtis Rance King Jr. – Vocals, Ensemble
- Selina King-Murrell – Vocals (background)
- Michael Knobloch – Production Coordination
- Joseph Kolinski – Vocals, Ensemble
- Alix Korey – Vocals, Ensemble
- John Kurlander – Engineer, Mixing
- Angela Lansbury – Performer
- Donna Lewis – Performer
- David Lowenstein – Vocals, Ensemble
- Mario Lucy – Engineer
- Steve MacMillan – Mixing
- Richard Marx – Arranger,

Performer

- Cindy Mizelle – Vocals, Ensemble
- David Newman – Conductor, Producer, Orchestration, Score Selections
- Bill Nolte – Vocals, Ensemble
- Michael Omartian – Producer
- Michele Pawk – Vocals, Ensemble
- Michael Perfitt – Mixing Assistant
- Bernadette Peters – Performer
- Darryl Phinnessee – Vocals (background)
- Tim Pierce – Guitar
- Freddy Piñero Jr. – Engineer
- Billy Porter – Vocals, Ensemble
- Patrick Quinn – Vocals, Ensemble
- Guy Roche – Arranger, Programming, Producer
- Karen Silver – Vocals, Ensemble
- J. K. Simmons – Vocals, Ensemble
- Frank Simms – Vocals, Ensemble
- Emily Skinner – Vocals, Ensemble
- Ted Sperling – Vocals, Ensemble
- Jim Steinman - Producer
- Moana Suchard – Engineer
- Thalía – Performer
- Vaneese Thomas – Vocals, Ensemble
- Michael Thompson – Guitar (Electric)
- Rene Toledo – Guitar (Acoustic)
- Dan Wallin – Engineer
- Tim Weidner – Keyboards, Programming, Engineer
- Lillias White – Vocals, Ensemble
- Aaron Zigman – String Arrangement

== Charts ==
=== Weekly charts ===
Chart (1997)	Peak position
French Albums (SNEP)	55
US Billboard 200	41

=== Year-end charts ===
Chart (1998)	Position
US Billboard 200	141

== Certifications and sales ==
Region	Certification	Certified units/sales
United States (RIAA)	Gold	500,000^{^}
^{^} Shipments figures based on certification alone.
