= Once Upon a December =

1997 song from the film Anastasia

Song by Liz Callaway

from the album Anastasia: Music from the Motion Picture
- Released: October 28, 1997
- Recorded: 1996–1997
- Length: 2:48
- Label: Atlantic
- Composer: Stephen Flaherty
- Lyricist: Lynn Ahrens
- Producers: Lynn Ahrens, Stephen Flaherty

Audio
- "Once Upon a December" on YouTube

"Once Upon a December" is a song from the 1997 20th Century Fox animated film Anastasia. The song was nominated for a Golden Globe Award for Best Original Song. It also appears in the 2016 stage adaptation of the film.

== About song ==
The song and its lyrics are heard three times through the course of the story, twice as a lullaby, and once as a complete song with a bridge. The lullaby is heard first during the film's prologue (performed by Angela Lansbury as the Dowager Empress Marie, and Lacey Chabert as the young Grand Duchess Anastasia Nikolaevna of Russia), then as an a cappella version toward the end of the film when the Dowager Empress and the adult Anastasia are reunited (sung by Lansbury, and Liz Callaway as Anastasia). Callaway also sings the complete version (which does not include the lullaby lyrics) during the film's second act.

A pop version with vocals by country singer Deana Carter was also featured on the film's soundtrack and was released as a music video.

Acapella group Pentatonix also covered the song on their 2020 Christmas album, We Need a Little Christmas.

== Production and synopsis ==
The melody of this song reprises a lullaby sung to Anastasia herself by her grandmother:

On the wind, 'cross the sea, hear this song and remember
Soon you'll be home with me, once upon a December

The Dowager Empress commissions a music box that plays the lullaby as a gift for young Anastasia, to comfort her while her grandmother is away. The recurring melody serves as a narrative device in the film since Anya's memory of the lullaby, and the music box's necklace key are her only ties to her forgotten past. The theme of memory is further enhanced by composer David Newman's recurring use of the melody throughout the film's score, also incorporating variations of the song "Journey to the Past".

The full version of "Once Upon a December" is sung by Anya after entering the now derelict Catherine Palace. The repressed memories of her past are stirred by her unknowing return to her childhood home, triggering a musical dream sequence in which the palace is returned to its former glory, and she remembers singing the tune as a child with her grandmother.

== Critical reception ==
DVDReview describes it as "the showstopper in the film". FilmTracks argues both these songs' "appeal as the 'leading lady's songs' are equally attractive. The site compared December favorably to Past, writing that "Once Upon a December better tells the film's story. Appearing in short vocal reprises throughout the score, this song is the connecting element between Anya and her lost grandmother, and the Russian sensibilities of the waltz are far more interesting than the rather straightforward ballad". DVDTalk described the song as intimate DarkRealmFox said it was "a fabulous musical number". CineMatter said "only two [of the film's songs] ("Journey to the Past", and "Once Upon a December") have any lasting presence". FilmVault says it is "fairy-tale lovely".

FilmTracks said the pop version is "the highlight of all the songs, despite the somewhat lazy vocal rendering". AllMusic describes it as an example of copying the "Disney formula of balancing big show tunes from the film with re-recorded MOR pop versions of the same song". DVDReview describes it as a "karaoke-style sing-a-long".
