= Journey to the Past =

1997 song by Liz Callaway

Song by Liz Callaway

from the album Anastasia: Music from the Motion Picture
- Released: October 28, 1997
- Studio: The Hit Factory, New York City
- Genre: Orchestral pop; show tune
- Length: 2:55
- Label: Atlantic
- Songwriters: Lynn Ahrens; Stephen Flaherty
- Producers: Ahrens; Flaherty

"Journey to the Past" is a song written by lyricist Lynn Ahrens and composer Stephen Flaherty for the animated musical film Anastasia (1997). Originally recorded for the film by American actress and singer Liz Callaway in her title role as the singing voice of Anastasia – who is going by her nickname "Anya" at the time – the song expresses the character's desire to follow sparse clues about her past in the hopes of learning more about her family and who she is. The third song written and recorded for the film, Ahrens and Flaherty conceived "Journey to the Past" as a means of expressing the different emotions Anya feels while she prepares to venture out on her own for the first time. Accompanying a musical sequence during which Anya travels from her Russian orphanage to St. Petersburg, the song incorporates the film's central themes about home, love and family.

To market the film to a wider audience, President of Fox Music Robert Kraft recruited American singer Aaliyah to record a pop and R&B version of the song, which is played during the film's end credits. Produced by Guy Roche, some of the songs' lyrics and melody were adjusted to suit Aaliyah's vocal style. The cover was released as the second single from the film's soundtrack album. Upon release, both versions of "Journey to the Past" received generally positive reviews, although film and music critics preferred Callaway's original rendition over Aaliyah's. It became a moderately successful pop hit in the UK. The song did not chart on the Billboard Hot 100; it only received minor adult contemporary airplay in the U.S. It stayed on the chart for only 4 weeks. The song was released on November 6, 1997 as the soundtrack's second single.

The song was nominated for both an Academy Award and Golden Globe Award for Best Original Song in 1998. Aaliyah performed her rendition of "Journey to the Past" live at the 70th Academy Awards. Actress Alexandra Shipp covered the song for the film Aaliyah: The Princess of R&B, a biographical film based on the singer's life. "Journey to the Past" has also appeared in the stage musical adaptation of the film, performed by actress Christy Altomare for the original Broadway cast album.

== Writing and recording ==
"Journey to the Past" was written by Lynn Ahrens and Stephen Flaherty, with Ahrens writing the song's lyrics and Flaherty composing the music. Although the songwriters had originally written a different song for Anya, they began writing "Journey to the Past" late one evening because they understood that "in Hollywood, you always have to write three songs for every scene". The second song written for that particular scene, Ahrens and Flaherty conceived "Journey to the Past" as a way to express the excitement Anya feels as she prepares to "set out on the adventure to finding the truth about her family". At the same time, the songwriters also wanted the song to demonstrate the various emotions the character feels as she readies herself to venture out into the world on her own for the first time, such as nervousness, hope, fear and joy. Flaherty incorporated "a feeling of motion" into its melody to demonstrate the fact that Anya sings "Journey to the Past" while traveling. The opening "vamp" Flaherty composed for the song's introduction was written to resemble the character's heartbeat as it races excitedly while "giv[ing] the feeling of the fear and self-doubt that always goes with when you're on the cusp of the next thing" prior to ultimately "finding the strength within you to continue".

Originally, the song was entitled "Forward to the Past" and then "Journey Through the Past" until the songwriters were ultimately convinced to rename it "Journey to the Past" after having a "metaphysical discussion" with executives of Fox Animation Studios, who complained that "you can't go through the past, you have to go to it as a destination". Early versions of the song featured a different bridge, as well as a different melody where the line "Journey to the past" is sung. Ahrens and Flaherty were writing songs for Anastasia at the same time they were working on their stage musical Ragtime (1996) in Toronto, Ontario. Thus, Ahrens and Flaherty were often required to communicate with the filmmakers in Hollywood, California and Phoenix, Arizona via conference call when they were unable to attend production meetings in person. During one particular conference call, Fox Music head Robert Kraft suggested that the refrain would benefit from a larger, "more sweeping musical gesture", to which Flaherty responded by playing three different notes to accompany the phrase "to the past". Kraft approved of the adjustment, which ultimately changed the melody of the entire song going forward. Although Kraft enjoyed the general "shape" of the song's melody", particularly the way in which it "searches and goes to these various keys", he believed that the song required a more simple and "direct" bridge using whole notes. Although Ahrens was initially troubled by the prospect of writing a bridge using only whole notes because she realized that meant each word would have to be "huge ideas", she decided to apply this to the words "home, love, family", using two different notes for the last word "family", which became "faaaa-mily". Other than these revisions, there was virtually no objection to the song; Flaherty recalled that "Journey to the Past" "felt absolutely right". Ahrens recalled that "somehow that song just seemed to capture it and everybody knew it the minute we played it for the powers that be".

Ahrens and Flaherty completed writing the song in one day, during what the lyricist described as "a burst of energy". Originally, American actress and singer Liz Callaway, who was known for her work on Broadway at the time, had only been hired to record demo tapes for the film until she impressed studio executives and was ultimately cast as Anya's singing voice, in lieu of actress Meg Ryan who provides the character's speaking voice. After Flaherty played the new song for her and the producers, the songwriters had Callaway record a demo of it shortly following a lengthy recording session. "Journey to the Past" was recorded at The Hit Factory recording studio in New York City after they had just finished recording "A Rumor in St. Petersburg" and "Once Upon a December", making "Journey to the Past" the third song recorded for the film. Although tired from the previous recording session in addition to it having been quite late in the evening, Callaway recorded the demo in one take, for which Flaherty accompanied her on piano. Ahrens recalled that she, Flaherty and Callaway immediately knew the song would be included in the film. According to Flaherty, everyone instantly loved "Journey to the Past", and the producers immediately decided to designate it as their next recording session. Flaherty had not had enough time to notate the song properly apart from a rough lead sheet used to teach the singer. Orchestrator Bill Brohn was able to transcribe the song into full orchestration after hearing Flaherty record the song onto a tape recorder "note for note". Callaway recalled recording the song until 1:00 am, with no one leaving until it was finally completed. The length of final note was held unintentionally; Callaway had simply forgotten at what point she was supposed to release the note, for which she apologized profusely and asked to re-record. However, Flaherty was impressed by Callaway's ability to sustain the note and insisted that it remain in the song.

== Context and use in Anastasia ==
Identified as a character song, "Journey to the Past" is the first song Anya sings in Anastasia. In the film, 18 year-old orphan Anya grows up unaware that she is truly the Grand Duchess Anastasia, the lone surviving member of the immediate Romanov family who was murdered during the Russian Revolution 10 years earlier. Raised in an orphanage, the character suffers from amnesia which renders her incapable of remembering her childhood or family. However, a cryptic necklace she wears around her neck that bears the inscription "Together in Paris" serves as a clue and gives her reason to believe that some trace of her family lives in Paris. She eventually decides to leave the orphanage in favor of traveling to Saint Petersberg, from where she plans on journeying to Paris, France in search of her family as well as the life past life she has long forgotten. During "Journey to the Past", she sings about overcoming and facing her fears. The song is performed by Anya as she travels in the snow, beginning to search for her family. Visually, director Don Bluth requested a song that could travel alongside Anya as she journeys from her orphanage to Saint Petersberg. At one point, the filmmakers recruited actress and writer Carrie Fisher (uncredited) to rework the scene in order to provide Ahrens and Flaherty with some new ideas for its song. Flaherty wrote that Fisher was employed because "they really wanted to get into the psyche of Anya". Ahrens and Flaherty had originally written a different song for the scene in which Anya is depicted riding on a bicycle before it was discarded in favor of "Journey to the Past". The idea of Anya riding a bicycle was abandoned because the songwriters wanted to show that Anya had not yet begun her journey, but was merely "on the cusp of the journey" instead. The songwriters deliberately wrote "Journey to the Past" to make it easier for the animators.

Used to initiate the story in order to depict Anya "moving on" from the orphanage, Ahrens explained that "Journey to the Past" is intended to be "a traveling song that took her from that point all the way to this point. It worked beautifully with the animation, and really told the story of a young woman starting out on a journey". Anya sings about what she wants and hopes to find on her journey, including home, love, and family, "launch[ing] her on the road to discovering who she really is". During the scene, Anya also befriends and adopts a small dog named Pooka, whom she takes with her on her journey. Filmtracks.com observed that the sequence "wrap[s] the story together with the necessary positive spirit". According to the book Show Music, "'Journey to the Past' effectively states [Anya's] goal to find 'Home, love, family' while revealing a feisty spirit". Tim Brayton of Alternate Ending described "Journey to the Past" as a "Yearning Song", finding it to be "a somewhat unconventional version of the trope, in that the heroine is active, rather than passive". Entertainment Weekly's Maureen Lee Lenker identified "Journey to the Past" as "a traditional musical theater 'I Want' number in its laying out the goals of the protagonist". Drawing similarities between "Journey to the Past" and "I Want" songs used in Disney films, Michael Dequina of The Movie Report wrote that "Anya articulates her dream of having a family" while "prancing her way through the snow-covered forest and even capping her song by dramatically raising her arms into the air", observing its strong resemblance to a musical number from a stage musical. Orchestral arrangements of the song by composer David Newman are used and reprised several times throughout Anastasia, including a final "victorious" rendition at the end of the film.

== Composition ==
According to the song's official sheet music published by TCF Music Publishing, Inc. on Musicnotes.com, "Journey to the Past" is a pop ballad played in cut time in the key of C major at a "moderate" speed of 84 beats per minute. Ahrens refers to the song's "twinkly opening bars" as the "shimmer". Author David Metzer identified "Journey to the Past" as a power ballad in his book The Ballad in American Popular Music: From Elvis to Beyoncé. A writer for Filmtracks.com touted "Journey to the Past" a "hopeful and energetic major-key representation of the entire film". Lyrically, the song discusses themes such as home, love and family, ideas that are central to both the film's storyline and Anya's journey. The song undergoes a lyrical progression that, according to Ahrens, mirrors the emotions of a young woman who is "standing on the brink of life and waiting to take it", beginning tentatively with "Heart, don't fail me now, courage, don't desert me, don't turn back now that we're here. People always say, life is full of choices, no one ever mentions fear" before ultimately growing in determination to reveal what she wants as the protagonist sings "one step down this road, I know someone's waiting, years of dreams just can't be wrong". Featuring multiple key changes, the song's bridge that reads "home, love, family" consists almost exclusively of whole notes in order to indicate "huge ideas" felt during that moment. The last 32 bars of the song evoke feelings of hopefulness and longing.

Thomas S. Hischak, author of The Oxford Companion to the American Musical: Theatre, Film, and Television, described "Journey to the Past" as "warm". According to Rachel Syme of The New York Times, "Journey to the Past" is a "twinkling and rousing" song about "moving forward by diving into history". Amazon.com reviewer Doug Thomas identified "Journey to the Past" as a "get-up-and-sing" number. According to Linda Buchwald of American Theatre, "Journey to the Past" is also about overcoming and facing one's fears. Jeffrey Gantz of the Boston Phoenix identified the ballad as "self-fulfillment anthem", comparing it to similar songs used in previous animated Disney films. Some critics and fans have interpreted "Journey to the Past" as an "empowerment anthem for women", discussing "going out into the unknown and taking life by the horns". Ahrens described the ballad as a song about "universal emotions that every woman, everybody feels as they step into their lives and take control of their lives and know that I'm at that no turning back moment in life".

== International versions ==
On its theater release in 1997, the film numbered 27 dubbings worldwide, to which 3 more were added in the following years, raising the number of official versions to 30. Spanish singer Virginia Martínez performed Anastasia's song both in Catalan and European Spanish.

Highlighted versions were released later than 1997

"Journey to the Past" worldwide
Language	Performer	Title	Translation	Image
Arabic	رشا رزق (Rasha Rizq)	"آه لو في الأحلام" ("Ah law fel-ahlam")	"Ah, if in dreams"	
Bulgarian	Елена Павлова (Elena Pavlova)	"Път назад" ("Pŭt nazad")	"Way back"	
Cantonese	陳美鳳 (Chen Meifeng)	—N/a	—N/a	
Catalan	Virginia Martínez	"Cap on vaig"	"Where I'm going"	
Czech	Alice Bardová	"Dálko, veď mě dál"	"Far, lead me"	
Danish	Nicoline Møller	"Rejse mod mit gamle hjem"	"Journey to my old home"	
Dutch	Vera Mann	"Terug naar toen"	"Back to the past"	
English	Liz Callaway	"Journey to the past"		
Finnish	Petra Karjalainen	"Matkallani menneeseen"	"On my journey to the past"	
Flemish	Sanne Denotté	"Terug naar toen"	"Back to the past"	
French (Canada)	Catherine Léveillé	"Quand on revit son passé"	"When you live your past again"	
French (Europe)	Katia Markosy	"Voyage dans le temps"	"Time travel"	
German	Jana Werner	"Reise durch die Zeit"	"Journey through time"	
Greek	Μαντώ Σταματοπούλου (Mantó Stamatopoúlou)	"Μια βουτια στο παρελθον" ("Mia voutia sto parelthon")	"One dip to the past"	
Hebrew	Limor Shapira	"מסע אל העבר" ("Masa el he'avar")	"Journey to the past"	
Hungarian	Pápai Erika	"Vár a múlt"	"Waiting for the past"	
Icelandic	Svala Björgvinsdóttir	"Aftur heim"	"Back home"	
Italian	Tosca	"Viaggio nel passato" (a.k.a. "Cuor, non dirmi 'no'")	"Journey to the past" (a.k.a. "Heart, don’t tell me 'no'")	
Japanese	Suzuki Honoka	"過去に続い" ("Kako ni tsudzui")	"Moving on to my past"	
Korean	이정화 (Lee Jeong-Hwa)	"과거 찾아 가는 길" ("Kwagŏ tchaja kanŭn kil")	"Looking for a way to the past"	
Norwegian	Anita Skorgan	"Vei til det som var"	"Way to what used to be"	
Polish	Katarzyna Skrzynecka	"Wspomnienia z dawnych lat"	"Memories from the old years"	
Portuguese (Brazil)	Juliana Franco	"Viagem ao passado"	"Journey to the past"	
Portuguese (Portugal)	Lúcia Moniz	"Regresso ao passado"	"Return to the past"	
Russian	Мария Кац (Mariya Katz)	"Не страшно будет мне" ("Ne strashno budet mne")	"I won't be afraid"	
Spanish (Spain)	Virginia Martínez	"Dime dónde vas"	"Tell me where you are going"	
Spanish (Latin America)	Thalía	"Viaje tiempo atrás"	"Journey back in time"	
Swedish	Helen Sjöholm	"Resa hem igen"	"Journey back home"	
Thai	จันทร์จิรา นิ่มพิทักษ์พงศ์ (Chanjira Nimpitakpong)	"เดินสู่ความหลัง" ("Dein s̄ū̀ khwām h̄lạng")	"Walk to the past"	
Turkish	Tuğba Önal	"Uzanırken geçmişe"	"Reaching to the past"	

== Reception and impact ==
DVDTalk's David Cornelius named the song "the film's best tune", while Joe Dziemianowicz of the New York Daily News called the song "hummable". Scott Matthewman of The Stage wrote that "Journey to the Past" proves "that Disney did not always hold the monopoly on beautiful standards". Describing the song as "an uplifting anthem", Den of Geek's Natalie Zutter called Callaway's performance "lovely" and cited "Journey to the Past" as an example of the singer receiving "great material to work with". In a more mixed review, Kenneth Turan, film critic for the Los Angeles Times, believed that the song was unlikely "to rock any boats" due to lyrics such as "Heart don't fail me now, courage don't desert me". The Boston Phoenix's Jeffrey Gantz dismissed "Journey to the Past" as little more than "the same self-fulfillment anthem that turns up in every Disney animation".

While Filmtracks.com enjoyed both "Journey to the Past" and "Once Upon a December" as "equally attractive" songs for a leading lady, the critic felt that the latter "better tells the film's story". "Journey to the Past" was nominated for an Academy Award for Best Original Song at the 70th Academy Awards in 1998. The song ultimately lost to Celine Dion's popular "My Heart Will Go On" from Titanic (1997); critics generally agreed that "Journey to the Past" had little chance of winning against "My Heart Will Go On". Cornelius lamented the fact that the ballad lost "to that darn Titanic theme". Although against the odds, Ahrens and Flaherty believed they had a chance of winning, although Ahrens's own mother called her to assure her "it's an honor just to be nominated", which she interpreted as her mother's way of saying "you're going to lose". Journey to the Past" was also nominated for a Golden Globe Award for Best Original Song that same year.

"Journey to the Past" is considered to be one of the most famous and iconic songs from the film, becoming particularly popular among young, female fans. The song ultimately became the film's signature song, an accomplishment the songwriters had never intended to achieve despite feeling a certain "energy that hinted at the number's potential" while initially writing it, and believe that its themes about home, family and love are responsible for its longevity and popularity. Ahrens and Flaherty were surprised by the track's "runaway success", expressing delight that new generations of fans continue to rediscover the song. Entertainment Weekly's Jessica Derschowitz believes that fans are able to recognize its "opening notes anywhere". Some critics have identified the song as a predecessor to "Let it Go", a popular, award-winning song from Disney's animated musical Frozen (2013). On its reputation as the film's breakout track, Rachel Syme of The New York Times dubbed "Journey to the Past" the "'Let It Go' of the '90s", describing the ballad as an "inescapable ear worm that leapt from an animated film to the radio charts to international concert halls and, ultimately, to the stage of the Academy Awards". Adam Hetrick of Playbill agreed that the song is "a precursor to Frozen's 'Let It Go'". Devoted fans of the film who grew up listening to and singing "Journey to the Past" have been dubbed "Fanastasias". Also writing for The New York Times, Jose Solís believes that the song, which he described as a "much-loved anthem", particularly resonates among immigrant audiences. "Journey to the Past" is also considered to be one of Callaway's signature songs; Seanna Cronin of The Morning Bulletin wrote that the singer remains "best known for singing the Oscar-nominated song Journey to the Past in the animated feature Anastasia" to international audiences.

== Live performances and cover versions ==
In 2012, Callaway sang "Journey to the Past" live at The New York Pops's 29th Birthday Gala: "Journey On" at Carnegie Hall, a concert celebrating the music of Ahrens and Flaherty. Callaway performed the song live during her cabaret show "Celebrate" at 54 Below in 2014. In 2017, Callaway sang the song during her concert "An Evening With Liz Callaway" at the Queensland Conservatorium Griffth University, a rendition Peter Pinne of Stage Whispers described as "undeniably thrilling". Describing it as a song that "everyone knows", Callaway recalled seeing fans "burst into tears" on numerous occasions upon hearing her sing it because it reminds them of their childhood. In addition to performing "Journey to the Past" live several times per year, Callaway included the song on her greatest hits album The Essential Liz Callaway (2015). It was subsequently dubbed in more than 31 languages to coincide with the film's international releases; various artists were hired to record their own versions of the song in the native languages of their countries.

Mexican singer Thalía covered the song in Spanish and in Brazilian Portuguese, which was included as a bonus track on the film's soundtrack. Filmtracks.com panned the cover as "irritating and baffling", feeling that it would have been more appropriate for the producers to commission a Russian cover of the song had they wanted to release a version in a different language. The reviewer concluded that "the album loses a star in its rating simply for this trashy attempt by Fox to expand their marketing capability to the Latino market when it flies in the face of all artistic logic", saying they should have opted for more of Newman's score instead. Norwegian singer Anita Skorgan released her own version in Norway, and Portuguese singer Lúcia Moniz recorded a cover for Portugal. Icelandic singer Svala first covered the song in Icelandic when she was 18 years old, and continues to perform it in concert in arenas and concert halls throughout Iceland 20 years later. Actress Helena Blackman performed "Journey to the Past" live in concert at the Pheasantry London in 2012 as part of her concert tour. British boy band Collabro recorded a classical cover of the song for their album Home (2017). The band released the song as a single on iTunes in January 2017 after English singer Elaine Paige premiered the track on her BBC Radio program, calling it "a fantastic, uplifting song".

== Aaliyah version ==
"Journey to the Past"

Single by Aaliyah

from the album Anastasia: Music from the Motion Picture
- Released: March 10, 1998
- Recorded: August 1997
- Genre: Pop; R&B
- Length: 4:03
- Label: Atlantic
- Songwriters: Lynn Ahrens; Stephen Flaherty
- Producer: Guy Roche

Aaliyah singles chronology
"Hot Like Fire" (1997)	"Journey to the Past" (1998)	"Are You That Somebody?" (1998)

=== Recording and production ===
Kraft conceived the idea of using "Journey to the Past" to promote the film to a broader audience, following Disney's example of hiring popular singers to record commercial versions of theme songs from some of their animated films, some of which became successful singles. Kraft recruited record producer Guy Roche to produce a pop version of "Journey to the Past" before expressing interest in American singer Aaliyah to record it. After listening to the demo, Roche determined that Aaliyah "would be perfect" to cover the song. Although being more associated with hip hop and R&B music, Roche believed the singer's "character, smile, and looks exuded something very, very sweet and gentle, very kind and peaceful", in addition to feeling that the tone of Aaliyah's voice suited his arrangement of "Journey to the Past". Additionally, both Ahrens and Flaherty were excited to hear that Aaliyah would be recording the song, describing themselves as "over the moon" upon learning that they would be working with the "young, beautiful star on the rise". Once final arrangements were made for Aaliyah to record a pop rendition of "Journey to the Past", the songwriters wanted to personalize the song to better suit the singer's "unique vocal style", agreeing to change some of its lyrics and tailor the melody to her voice. Ahrens and Flaherty then approved Roche's "contemporary pop" arrangement of their song.

Aaliyah and Roche recorded the song in Toronto, Ontario to accommodate the singer's schedule due to her careering being "on the up" at the time; the producer joked that it seemed as though the singer had always "just gotten off a plane" before heading to the studio to record the song amidst being interrupted for interviews before finally boarding another plane, every time they collaborated. However, Roche maintains that Aaliyah's "hectic" schedule did not negatively affect her performance, recalling her as "wonderful to work with, always focused, very patient, always positive ... She gave meaning to every line of the song in her performance, every take, which makes me think she must have been a good actress". Although Roche valued her opinion, the singer remained patient and tended to express them only after "all creative minds in the control room ran out of suggestions". Although Ahrens and Flaherty were unable to attend the recording session, they enjoyed the final version, with Ahrens describing it as "very 'Aaliyah': cool, jazzy, hip-hoppy". Aaliyah's pop version of the song appears during the film's closing credits. Jennifer Warner, author of Aaliyah: A Biography, considers the song's use in the film to be Aaliyah's film debut.

=== Music and lyrics ===
According to Vibe's Jason King, "Journey to the Past" is a pop ballad that presents Aaliyah as a "vulnerable ingenue". Mya Singleton from YardBarker also labeled the song as a pop ballad. Author Jennifer Warner said the song was an R&B tinged pop version of the original song. Musically, the track is a "departure from the brand of edgy R&B" Aaliyah had become known for singing. At the same time, however, it allowed the singer to truly showcase the power of her voice. Writing for Okayplayer, Thembisa Mshaka described Aaliyah's vocals as unexpectedly powerful while identifying the ballad as a "torch song". Billboard's Larry Flick described the single as a "lightweight shuffling ballad", to which Aaliyah "brings a subtle soul flavor". Daisy Jones of Dazed agreed that the singer's "caramel-smooth vocals gave this ultra-sugary ballad ... a gleaming R&B edge". The song is composed in the key of D-flat major and is set in time signature of common time with a tempo of 88 beats per minute, while Aaliyah's vocal range spans from Bb♯_{3} to Eb♯_{5}. Lyrically, she "pleads" the line "heart don't fail me now, courage don't desert me", according to Torment Saint: The Life of Elliott Smith author William Todd Schultz.

=== Critical reception ===
Contributing to Billboard, Larry Flick wrote that the single completed Aaliyah's "transformation into a pop princess", praising her vocal performance for sounding "broader and more impressive than any past recordings have indicated" and interpretation of its lyrics. Connie Johnson from the Los Angeles Times, felt because of Aaliyah's hip-hop image, "it's surprising to hear how comfortably she fits within the wholesome, sugarcoated framework of 'Journey to the Past'", Music Week described the song as a "subtle ballad" and felt that Aaliyah "proved her talent doesn't just belong in the Mainstream R&B Category". MTV.com said that Aaliyah "injects a more modern flair with the warm, feel-good theme "Journey To The Past". Okayplayer's Thembisa Mshaka believes the singer would be releasing more pop songs and torch ballads along the lines of "Journey to the Past" if she were still alive today.

Several critics voiced their preference for Callaway's original version over Aaliyah's single, which has appeared to resonate more with fans of the film. McCarty's review of Aaliyah's pop rendition of the song was more mixed: "...as is almost always the case with these animated musicals that produce radio hits, I prefer the in-movie version". Stephen Thomas Erlewine of AllMusic gave a somewhat positive review of Aaliyah's rendition, calling it a good version of a song that sounds better in its original form. Emalie Marthe of Broadly considers "Journey to the Past" to be among Aaliyah's more "forgotten" songs. Bio.com's Sara Bibel agreed that the song is "little remembered".

=== Commercial performance ===
Commercially, "Journey to the Past" was "not a standout radio hit". No physical commercial single was released for the song in the United States, making it ineligible at the time for inclusion on the US Billboard Hot 100; it also did not impact any of the Billboard component charts. It peaked at number 28 on the US Radio & Records Adult Contemporary chart. Meanwhile, the song performed moderately in the United Kingdom, becoming Aaliyah's ninth best-selling single in the country.

Despite its mediocre commercial performance, Aaliyah: More Than a Woman author Christopher John Farley considers the single to have been "a substantial hit" for Aaliyah. Rachel Syme, writing for The New York Times, agreed that Aaliyah's version ultimately "set it on a course to global omnipresence". After "Journey to the Past", Aaliyah would contribute commercially successful singles to the soundtracks of other films, including Dr. Dolittle (1998) and Romeo Must Die (2000), the latter of which she starred in.

=== Music video ===
The music video for "Journey to the Past" made its television debut on cable network channels such as BET and VH1 during the week ending November 16, 1997. It would premiere on The Box during the week of November 29. The single's music video features scenes of Aaliyah alternating between then-modern day America and the film's animated incarnation of Russia during the 1920s, interacting with various characters and locations from the animated film. Aaliyah is shown traveling through snow-covered landscapes wearing a beige jumpsuit and floor-length mink coat. The music video begins in a modern-day American neighborhood on a seemingly warm day. Aaliyah is seen singing in the windows of a small grocery store and on the street where children are playing in an open fire hydrant. Tying into the theme of going back to the past, Aaliyah goes back and forth from the real modern-day world to the animated world of Russia in the 1920s, the time in which Anastasia is set. She is then seen in several of the movie's iconic scenes such as balancing on a log with Anastasia behind her, out in the snow where the "Journey to the Past" song is featured in the film, in the ballroom in the "Once Upon a December" sequence, ascending the lift in the Eiffel Tower (the "Paris Holds the Key (To Your Heart)" scene) and on stage in the Russian ballet scene. The fountains of Jardins du Trocadéro can be seen briefly. The music video ends with her sitting on the rooftop seemingly overlooking the final scene in which Dimitri and Anastasia kiss and finally on the clouds above St. Petersburg with the children.

Upon the film's initial release, "Journey to the Past" garnered heavy rotation. The music video was included as a bonus feature on the 2006 DVD re-release of the film, entitled Anastasia: Family Fun Edition, paired with a "making-of" featurette that depicts Aaliyah recording the song in the studio, interspersed with interviews of the singer discussing both the song and the film. The re-released music video also features a dedication to Aaliyah, who had died in a plane crash on August 25, 2001. David Cornelius of DVDTalk reviewed the music video as one of the DVD's "better" features, but found the making of featurette "rather pointless" for lacking "footage of anyone actually making the video" in spite of its title.

=== Live performance ===
Aaliyah was invited to perform "Journey to the Past" live at the 70th Academy Awards, where the song had been nominated for an Academy Award for Best Original Song. The awards ceremony was held at the Shrine Auditorium in Los Angeles, California on March 23, 1998. Aged 19 at the time, the singer became the youngest person to perform at the Academy Awards in the history of the ceremony. Aaliyah reported that various journalists and celebrities kept informing her that the ceremony was expected to be the most-watched Academy Awards telecast ever. The first of five Academy Award-nominated musical performances that evening, Aaliyah shared with Roche that she was feeling nervous during the moments prior to her performance. She confided in singer Michael Bolton who was scheduled to perform "Go the Distance" from Hercules (1997) immediately after her, asking him "are you as nervous as I am?" Aaliyah wore a form-fitting black dress for her performance in stark contrast to her signature tomboyish attire. According to Kathy Iandoli of The Boombox, Aaliyah's decision to wear a dress signified that she was preparing to venture into "more mature territory". The performance lasted three minutes and 12 seconds.

Billboard expected that the single would "explode" into a "surefire hit" immediately after the performance. Attending the ceremony introduced Aaliyah to several of Hollywood's most popular celebrities at the time, in addition to exposing the singer to exactly the kind of artist she was aspiring to become. Writing for Complex, Julian Pereira identified the feat as "A big moment in Aaliyah's career", believing that her performance "overshadowed" the song's nomination. According to Bio.com, Aaliyah achieved further recognition following her Academy Awards performance. Aaliyah: A Biography biographer Jennifer Warner credits her performance with demonstrating that she was prepared "to take the word's biggest stages" as she approached the end of her teenage years. Broadly's Emalie Marthe agreed that "the performance remains a special moment in a astronomical career cut tragically short."

Ahrens herself considers having had the opportunity to watch Aaliyah sing the song she wrote live an "out-of-body experience", admitting that she feels both happy and sad hearing the song after Aaliyah's death "know[ing] that her talent was ended so soon". Writing for The New York Times, Rachel Syme concluded that Aaliyah's death in 2001 only further establishes the performance as "a lasting cultural moment". Rap-Up considers Aaliyah's live rendition of "Journey to the Past" to be among the singer's "10 Greatest Live Performances". Dazed included the performance among the 10 "most surprising musical moments" in Academy Award history. Bustle ranked Aaliyah both attending and performing at the ceremony one of "15 Important Moments For Black Women On The Oscars Red Carpet".

=== Aaliyah: The Princess of R&B ===
Both Aaliyah's surviving family and Blackground Records refused to grant Lifetime the rights to use the majority of the singer's music in Aaliyah: The Princess of R&B (2014), a biographical film based on the late singer's life and career. The film's producers were only able to secure rights to some of Aaliyah's earlier, less popular recordings. Consequently, "Journey to the Past" was one of only four songs the producers were allowed to use in the film due to the single being owned by Atlantic Records. Michael Arceneaux of Complex remarked that the song "is not exactly among the first 10 songs she is best known for". Actress Alexandra Shipp covered "Journey to the Past" for the film in her starring role as Aaliyah, reenacting the singer's performance at the Academy Awards. Shipp wanted her covers to show Aaliyah's growth and progression as a vocalist, beginning with "a couple iffy notes" before ultimately concluding with "Journey to the Past" as a culmination of the recording artist having finally discovered "how her actual voice should sound", hoping her performance would remind audiences of "that big boom moment that they had when they saw her perform that song". For the Academy Awards scene, Shipp wore a replica of the black dress Aaliyah donned during her original performance. Costume designer Michelle Lyte made the top-half of the dress using transparent knit fabric; Shipp was allowed to keep the dress after filming completed.

Shipp's rendition of "Journey to the Past" is one of four full-length performances featured in the film, all of which are songs originally performed by other artists that Aaliyah covered throughout her career. Like the film in which it is featured, Shipp's cover of "Journey to the Past" received mostly negative reviews from critics. RantNow contributor Clyde Barretto dismissed Shipp's vocals on the song as "shaky". Writing for The Morton Report, Chaz Lipp criticized the actress for "struggling to sound meaningful while singing the inexplicably Oscar-nominated 'Journey to the Past'", while failing to "convey Aaliyah's allure as a performer and vocalist". However, Clover Hope of Jezebel included Shipp's cover among 12 things she enjoyed from "Lifetime's Terrible Aaliyah Movie", describing her performance as "shaky as hell" but believing "her vocals overall will make you appreciate the soft, subtle approach that Aaliyah brought to her songs".

=== Track listing and formats ===
Cassette and CD singles

1. "Journey to the Past" (album version) (performed by Aaliyah) - 4:09
2. "Journey to the Past" (film version) (performed by Liz Callaway) - 2:58

=== Charts ===
Weekly chart performance for "Journey to the Past"
Chart (1998)	Peak position
Europe (European Hot 100 Singles)	98
Scottish Singles Sales (Official Charts)	35
UK Singles (Official Charts)	22
UK Hip Hop/R&B (Official Charts)	6
US Adult Contemporary (Radio & Records)	28

=== Release history ===
Release dates and formats for "Journey to the Past"
Region	Date	Format(s)	Label(s)	Ref.
United States	March 10, 1998	Contemporary hit radio	Blackground; Atlantic	
United Kingdom	March 23, 1998	CD	Atlantic	

== Stage version ==
The song appears in the stage musical adaptation of the film, which premiered on Broadway at the Broadhurst Theatre on April 24, 2017. "Journey to the Past" is one of five songs retained from the film. In addition to originating the role of Anastasia, actress Christy Altomare recorded "Journey to the Past" for the show's original Broadway cast album, which she specifically asked to record last so that afterward she could then "walk out into the streets of New York having just sung it". Altomare had grown up singing the song constantly ever since learning that Callaway, of whom she had been a fan since seeing her perform in the musical Cats (1981), had sung the song in the film. Ahrens claims that adapting Anastasia for the stage helped her realize the true impact the song has had on listeners and fans, recalling the audience's reaction to hearing "Journey to the Past" for the first time. Actor Derek Klena, who plays Dimitry in the production, identified "Journey to the Past" as one of the songs "that stick in everyone's head when they think about Anastasia", describing it as his favorite song and scene in the original film. The show's producers heavily used "Journey to the Past" to promote the musical, particularly its opening bars, including in its first teaser trailer. In February 2017, Altomare sang "Journey to the Past" at the University of Cincinnati's College-Conservatory of Music, her alma mater, accompanied by the university's CCM Philharmonia Orchestra. The first official live performance of a song from the stage production, Altomare donned a black and white gown for the performance, which the producers filmed and uploaded to YouTube, where it garnered over 510,000 views almost immediately. Pretty 52 called Altomare's performance "spellbinding". On April 26 the same year, Altomare performed the song live on The Today Show accompanied by a full orchestra, as part of the program's "Best of Broadway" week. After the November 29, 2017 performance of the show, Altomare performed the song following the curtain call with the animated film's sequence projected behind her to commemorate the film's 20th anniversary.

One of the most significant ways in which the musical deviates from its source material, Ahrens and Flaherty decided that "Journey to the Past" would not be Anya's first song in the show, arguing that her journey had not yet truly begun that early in the narrative. The songwriters decided to alter "Journey to the Past"'s position in the story, relocating it to the middle of the production in favor of using the song as the Act 1 conclusion instead. By doing so, the song evolves into more of an "I Want" song, explaining that "even though it dealt with indecision, [the song] couldn't be the start of a character arc" because they needed to lay the groundwork for that moment. The character now sings the song after she has finally arrived in Paris, France, where she will ultimately discover whether or not she is in fact the Grand Duchess. Ahrens believes that after spending the entire first act desperately trying to find out who she is, the new placement establishes that Anya is now finally "on the brink of it. Now, it's beginning. What I wanted is coming true, and I'm almost there". Ahrens concluded that Anya has now officially "earned" the right to sing "Journey to the Past" as opposed to "right out of the gate" as she does in the film, calling its new placement "more effective". Flaherty agreed that Anya "couldn't be that strong, character-wise, until the end of Act One, so that song was moved", filling its original slot with a new song written for Anya entitled "In My Dreams" which they believed was "more appropriate" for that particular moment, inspired by the more psychological journey the heroine undergoes in the 1956 film about the Anastasia tale. Another reason for the adjustment is that librettist Terrence McNally wanted Act One and Act Two to take place exclusively in Russia and Paris, respectively, using "Journey to the Past" to reflect that Paris is "free, expressive, creative, no barriers" unlike Russia. American Theatre's Linda Buchwald praised Altomare for "mak[ing] it her own, hitting the notes to make it a powerful first-act closer".

Matt Windman of AM New York identified "Journey to the Past" as one of the score's highlights, describing it as a "pretty power ballad". The Stage's Mark Shenton agreed that the musical number is one of the show's "stand-outs". Praising Altomare's performance, Dave Quinn of NBC New York wrote that the actress voice "is the sort of pure, perfect soprano that pierces the heart and warms the soul ... specifically in the showstopping 'Journey to the Past'".
