= In the Dark of the Night =

Song by Jim Cummings

from the album Anastasia: Music from the Motion Picture
- Released: October 28, 1997
- Length: 2:27
- Label: Atlantic
- Songwriters: Lynn Ahrens; Stephen Flaherty
- Producers: Lynn Ahrens; Stephen Flaherty; Jim Steinman

"In the Dark of the Night" is a song written by lyricist Lynn Ahrens and composer Stephen Flaherty for 20th Century Fox's 1997 animated film Anastasia. It is sung by Rasputin (Christopher Lloyd speaking, Jim Cummings singing) and serves as the villain song. The song was produced by Jim Steinman, known for his work with artists such as Meat Loaf and Bonnie Tyler.

Although the song is not used in the musical adapted from the film, the ending melody ("Come my minions, rise for your master...") is sampled extensively in the new song "Stay, I Pray You". Flaherty remarked that despite the drastically different context, the reused melody worked "surprisingly well".

== Synopsis ==
Rasputin is stuck in Limbo because his curse against the Romanov family has failed to kill the sole surviving member, the Grand Duchess Anastasia. When Bartok, an albino bat and his trusted only friend, reunites with him in Limbo, Rasputin bemoans the loss of his enchanted reliquary, a gift from the dark forces used to kill the Romanovs. The song begins as Bartok, having been taken to Limbo by the same reliquary, returns it to Rasputin. Rejoicing, Rasputin sings about his plan to take revenge on Anastasia for escaping his initial attack ("My curse made each of them pay / But one little girl got away / Little Anya, beware, Rasputin's awake!"), with insects (cockroaches, caterpillars, beetles, worms) and arachnids (scorpions) joining in the song as the chorus, and vows that his "Revenge will be sweet / when the curse is complete". As the song ends, he summons his demonic minions from the reliquary and sends them to destroy the train on which Anastasia is travelling.

== Critical reception ==
FilmTracks wrote: "The villain's song for Rasputin isn't particularly popular, and some may even wish that Christopher Lloyd had attempted his own vocals. Yet, the deep male vocals paired with high female ghost hauntings are very creative, and outstanding lyrics and a fine balance between the Russian doom and gloom and the slight comedy needed for the genre is decently accomplished. The bass region is well treated in this song, too". DVDTalk describes the song as grand. AWN described it as "a wonderful mixture of rock and traditional Russian choral music, with a gaggle of wormettes providing backup".
