= Tari Kelly =

American musical theatre actress

- Born: Madison, Wisconsin
- Education: Madison East High School, DePaul University, University of Wisconsin
- Occupation: Musical theatre actress

Tari Kelly is an American theater actress and singer. She is best known for her role as Countess Lily in the first national tour of Anastasia.

== Education and career ==
Tari Kelly attended Madison East High School in Madison, Wisconsin. She took dance lessons at Virginia Davis School of Dance and began acting in shows in her local community theater, performing in shows, including Annie. She discovered she had a passion for theater when she landed the lead in her high school music, The Boyfriend. After graduating high school, she attended DePaul University's acting conservatory but transferred a year later to the University of Wisconsin to dance and sing as well. While in Wisconsin, Kelly acted in many production at the regional Fireside Theatre.

Kelly made her Broadway debut in 1994 with Show Boat as a swing and understudy for Lottie, Ellie, and Dottie. Following her debut, she joined the national tours of Beauty and the Beast and Show Boat. In 2003, she returned to Broadway to play in the ensemble and a member of the Trio in The Boy from Oz. A year later, she landed the lead role of Audrey in the Little Shop of Horrors national tour, which she calls her favorite role. In 2007, she played Mama Who in Dr. Seuss' How the Grinch Stole Christmas!, which starred Patrick Page, and played Sally Bowles in the Cabaret national tour a year later. From 2011 to 2012, Kelly join Broadway's Anything Goes as a passenger and a replacement/understudy for various roles, and in 2015 to 2016, she joined the world premiere of Something Rotten! on Broadway as a member of the ensemble. In her most recent Broadway role, Kelly played Mrs. Cleveland and the Piano Teacher in Groundhog Day. In 2018, she opened the Anastasia first North American tour as Countess Lily. She portrays Mrs. White, the perpetual widow, in the 2024 national tour of Clue: On Stage.
