= Anastasia (musical) =

2017 musical by Lynn Ahrens and Stephen Flaherty

- Vocal Selections artwork
- Music: Stephen Flaherty
- Lyrics: Lynn Ahrens
- Book: Terrence McNally
- Basis: Anastasia by Don Bluth; Gary Goldman; Susan Gauthier; Bruce Graham; Bob Tzudiker; Noni White; Eric Tuchman
- Premiere: May 27, 2016: Hartford Stage, Hartford
- Productions: 2016 Hartford (tryout); 2017 Broadway; 2018 North America tour 2018 Spain; 2018 Germany; 2019 Netherlands; 2020 Japan; 2022 Brazil; 2023 Mexico; 2024 Denmark; 2024 Italy; 2025 Australia; 2026 Argentina

Anastasia is a stage musical with music and lyrics by Stephen Flaherty and Lynn Ahrens, and a book by Terrence McNally. Based on the 20th Century Fox Animation 1997 film of the same name directed by Don Bluth and Gary Goldman, the musical adapts the legend of the Grand Duchess Anastasia Nikolaevna of Russia, who was rumored to have escaped and survived the execution of the Russian Imperial family. Many years later, an amnesiac young woman named Anya hopes to find some trace of her past by siding with two con men, who wish to take advantage of her resemblance to Anastasia.

After completing a pre-Broadway run in Hartford, Connecticut in 2016, the show premiered on Broadway at the Broadhurst Theatre in April 2017, and since then its success has spawned multiple productions worldwide.

== Plot ==
=== Prologue ===
In 1906, Saint Petersburg, Russia, Dowager Empress Maria Feodorovna comforts her youngest granddaughter, five-year-old Grand Duchess Anastasia, who is saddened that her grandmother is moving to Paris, France. Before departing, the Dowager Empress gives Anastasia a music box as a parting gift ("Prologue: Once Upon a December"). Twelve years later, on her "name day" (17th birthday), Anastasia is attending a ball with her family when the Bolsheviks invade the palace. As they attempt to escape, Anastasia tries to retrieve her music box, only to be captured along with the rest of her family ("The Last Dance of the Romanovs"). The Dowager Empress later receives word in Paris that the entire family has been executed.

=== Act I ===
In 1927, Gleb Vaganov, a general for the Bolsheviks, who now control Russia, announces to the gloomy Russians that the now-poor Saint Petersburg has been renamed Leningrad, and he promises a bright and peaceful future. The Russians protest this change, but are then uplifted by a rumor that Anastasia may have survived and escaped the royal family's execution. Two wanted con men, the handsome young Dmitry and an ex-member of the Imperial Court, Vlad Popov, hear the rumors and brainstorm "the biggest con in history": they will groom a naïve girl to become Anastasia in order to extract money from the Dowager Empress ("A Rumor in St. Petersburg").

Dmitry and Vlad hold unsuccessful auditions for the scheme at the theater in the abandoned Yusupov Palace. Just as they are about to give up hope of finding a suitable impostor, a street sweeper named Anya walks in to ask Dmitry about paperwork to get tickets for Paris. Dmitry and Vlad become fascinated as Anya explains that she doesn't remember who she is due to her amnesia and has very few memories of her past ("In My Dreams"). Realizing that she bears a strong resemblance to Anastasia, they select Anya as their impostor.

At the capital, government workers sort through rumors and reports for any that require further action. Three bitter actresses report Anya, Dmitry, and Vlad's plot to Gleb; he dismisses them and decides to have Anya put under surveillance ("The Rumors Never End"). Back at the palace, Vlad and Dmitry groom a feisty Anya to become Anastasia through history, dining, and dancing lessons ("Learn to Do It").

Gleb orders Anya's arrest, and she is brought to his office in the Nevsky Prospect. The general interrogates the girl and warns her about the consequences of pretending to be Anastasia. He tries to convince her that Anastasia is really dead by revealing that his father was one of the soldiers who shot the Romanovs and, as a boy, Gleb heard the gunshots and the family's screams. However, Gleb notices that Anya has the "Romanov eyes" and realizes that Anya could indeed be Anastasia. As he harbors feelings for her, he lets her off with a warning ("The Neva Flows").

Anya reunites with Dmitry and they are teased and attacked by his old drunk con partners, whom they must fight off ("The Neva Flows Reprise"). Impressed by Anya's fighting skills, Dmitry opens up to her for the first time and tells her about his childhood in the streets of St. Petersburg and how he had to take care of himself as an orphan ("My Petersburg"). Dmitry begins to trust her enough to show her a music box that he's failed to open, unaware that it is the memento which had been given to Anastasia by the Dowager Empress. Anya easily winds and opens the box and begins to vaguely remember her past, including an imperial ball many years earlier ("Once Upon a December"). After this episode, Anya is more resolute than ever in her desire to get to Paris, but Dmitry lacks the money for tickets. Anya then gives him her only possession: a diamond that was found sewn into her dress in the hospital years earlier ("A Secret She Kept").

At the train station, Count Ipolitov recognizes Anya as Anastasia and kisses her hand. As they board the train to Paris, the count leads his fellow exiles in a prayer of farewell to Russia ("Stay, I Pray You"). During the train ride, Anya, Dmitry, and Vlad reflect on what they hope to accomplish in Paris: Anya hoping to discover that she is actually Anastasia, Dmitry's desire for the money, and Vlad hoping to win back Countess Lily Malevsky-Malevitch ("Sophie" in the 1997 animated film), the Dowager Empress's lady-in-waiting with whom he had an affair ("We'll Go From There"). Count Ipolitov is fatally shot by the police for illegally boarding the train. The police officers then go after Anya, Dmitry, and Vlad since they are wanted criminals in Russia, but they all jump off the train, narrowly avoiding capture.

As they travel across Russia by foot, Gleb receives orders to follow Anya and kill her if she is the real Anastasia ("Traveling Sequence"). Gleb agrees to the task, but he realizes that he is in love with Anya and questions his heart ("Still"). Anya, Vlad, and Dmitry finally arrive in France, and as they travel to Paris, Anya summons the courage to continue on with the hope that she will finally discover who she is ("Journey to the Past").

=== Act II ===
Anya, Vlad and Dmitry arrive in Paris and are swept up by the sights and sounds of the city ("Paris Holds the Key (to Your Heart)"). When Vlad and Dmitry go off on their own, Anya visits the Pont Alexandre III bridge, named after Anastasia's grandfather, and she feels a strong connection to it ("Crossing a Bridge").

Now a bitter, elderly woman, Dowager Empress Maria Feodorovna reads the letters from various women claiming to be Anastasia and, heartbroken, declares that she will see no more of them ("Close the Door"). As Gleb arrives in Paris, Lily parties at the Neva Club, where she and her guests reminisce about the old Russia ("Land of Yesterday"). Lily is reunited with Vlad, with whom she is angry for stealing her jewelry when they were lovers. The two rekindle their scandalous romance and Vlad convinces her to let Anya meet the Dowager Empress at the ballet the next week ("The Countess and the Common Man"). However, Vlad accidentally drops the ballet tickets and Gleb, overhearing their plans, reaffirms his loyalty to the Bolsheviks ("Land of Yesterday Reprise").

At the hotel, Anya has a nightmare about the execution of the Romanovs ("A Nightmare"). Dmitry comforts her and recounts a story of how he bowed to Anastasia at a parade as a young boy. Anya vividly remembers this, and the two realize that Anya is indeed the Grand Duchess Anastasia ("In a Crowd of Thousands").

At the ballet, Vlad suspects that Anya and Dmitry are falling in love and is heartbroken on their behalf that the two can never be together ("Meant to Be"). During the performance of Swan Lake, Anya sees the Dowager Empress and remembers her. The Dowager Empress also sees Anya and recognizes her, but clings to denial. Dmitry and Gleb (who is conflicted about whether or not to shoot Anya) reflect on their romantic feelings ("Quartet at the Ballet").

After the ballet, Lily also recognizes Anya as Anastasia and immediately takes her to the Dowager Empress. Dmitry is anxious about the meeting and realizes that he has fallen in love with Anya, but knows he must let her go to her family ("Everything to Win"). Anya leaves the meeting enraged, having learned from the Dowager Empress that Vlad and Dmitry intended to use her in their scheme for money. As she storms off, Dmitry waits for the Dowager Empress. Marie coldly dismisses him, but Dmitry disrespectfully stops her. He begs her to see Anya, but she refuses again.

Back at the hotel, Anya begins to pack, but she is interrupted by the Dowager Empress who, impressed by Dmitry's courage, has come to give her an opportunity. Anya is shocked by the Dowager Empress's cruelty, asserting that she isn't the nana that Anya remembered. The Dowager Empress angrily questions Anya about her past and the Romanov family, but Anya compels her to reflect on the person she has become. Anya suddenly remembers the night that the Dowager Empress left her for Paris. When Anya produces the music box and sings the lullaby, the Dowager Empress finally realizes that Anya really is Anastasia and the two embrace, now reunited after twenty years ("Once Upon a December Reprise").

A press conference is held the next morning, where Vlad and Lily try to fend off the hungry reporters ("The Press Conference"). Before appearing in public, the Dowager Empress tells Anya that Dmitry did not take the reward after all and reveals her respect for him. Anya expresses misgivings about her future life as a princess and the Dowager Empress insists that no matter what she chooses, they'll always be together. Anya runs off to think; she realizes that she is in love with Dmitry, and decides that she must go after him ("Everything to Win Reprise"). As she turns to leave, Anya sees that Gleb has slipped in and locked them in the room. She realizes why he is there and Gleb says that he must kill her to complete his father's mission. Anya now clearly remembers the day her family was killed and, without fear, taunts him to kill her so that she can be with her family. Overcome with emotion and not willing to bear the shame of his father, Gleb is unable to kill Anya ("Still/The Neva Flows Reprise"). Anya comforts Gleb and they call a truce.

The Dowager Empress realizes that Anya has chosen to renounce her royal status; she and Gleb announce to their people that the rumors of the Grand Duchess will now cease; as far as the world is concerned, Anastasia is dead. Anya discovers Dmitry at Pont Alexandre III, where they embrace. The couple leaves Paris as the spirits of the Romanovs celebrate the life that Anya and Dmitry will have together ("Finale").

== Background ==
Stephen Flaherty (music), Lynn Ahrens (lyrics) and Terrence McNally (book) created a script for the musical Anastasia, a stage adaptation of the 1997 animated film Anastasia, itself a story inspired by the myth that Grand Duchess Anastasia Nikolaevna of Russia survived the murder of the Romanov family. (Note: In the twentieth century, this myth circulated and there were multiple individuals who claimed to be Anastasia. The myth was conclusively disproven after the 1991 dissolution of the Soviet Union.) A reading was held in 2012, featuring Kelli Barrett as Anya (Anastasia), Aaron Tveit as Dmitry, Patrick Page as Vladimir, Aaron Lazar as Gleb, Julie Halston as Countess Lily and Angela Lansbury (reprising her role from the film) as the Dowager Empress. A workshop was held on June 12, 2015, in New York City, and included Elena Shaddow as Anya, Ramin Karimloo as Gleb Vaganov, Mark Evans as Dmitry, Douglas Sills as Vlad and Mary Beth Peil as the Dowager Empress.

Director Tresnjak explained that the musical contains six songs from the film and 16 new numbers. The musical also adds characters not seen in the film. The musical omits elements of fantasy that appeared in the film, such as its villain—a depiction of Grigori Rasputin as an undead wizard accompanied by a talking bat named Bartok—who is replaced with a new antagonist, Bolshevik general Gleb.

== Productions ==
=== World premiere ===
The original stage production of Anastasia premiered at the Hartford Stage in Hartford, Connecticut, running from May 12, 2016, to June 19, 2016. The show was directed by Darko Tresnjak and choreographed by Peggy Hickey, with Christy Altomare and Derek Klena starring as Anya and Dmitry, respectively opposite Caroline O'Connor as Countess Lily, Manoel Felciano as Gleb, Mary Beth Peil as the Dowager Empress, and John Bolton as Vlad.

=== Broadway ===
The musical opened on Broadway at the Broadhurst Theatre on March 23, 2017, in previews, later officially on April 24, featuring most of the original Hartford principal cast, the exception being Ramin Karimloo taking over the role of Gleb. The show's capital investment was up to $15 million.

The production was met with mixed reviews by critics, citing uneven subplots and an overly long running time as primary issues. The show closed on March 31, 2019 after 808 regular and 34 preview performances.

=== North America tours ===
The first North America tour began on October 9, 2018 (officially on October 12) at the Proctor's Theatre in Schenectady, New York, with Lila Coogan as Anya, Stephen Brower as Dmitry, Jason Michael Evans as Gleb, Edward Staudenmayer as Vlad, Tari Kelly as Countess Lily, and Joy Franz as Dowager Empress, and closed on March 12, 2020, at the Walton Arts Center in Fayetteville, when performances were suspended due to the COVID-19 pandemic.

A non-equity U.S. tour kicked off on October 15, 2021, at the Columbia County Performing Arts Center in Evans, Georgia, starring Kyla Stone as Anya, Sam McLellan as Dmitry, Brandon Delgado as Gleb, Bryan Seastrom as Vlad, Madeline Raube as Countess Lily, and Gerri Weagraff as Dowager Empress. The non-equity tour played its final performance on May 21, 2023, at the Pioneer Center for the Performing Arts in Reno, Nevada.

=== International productions ===
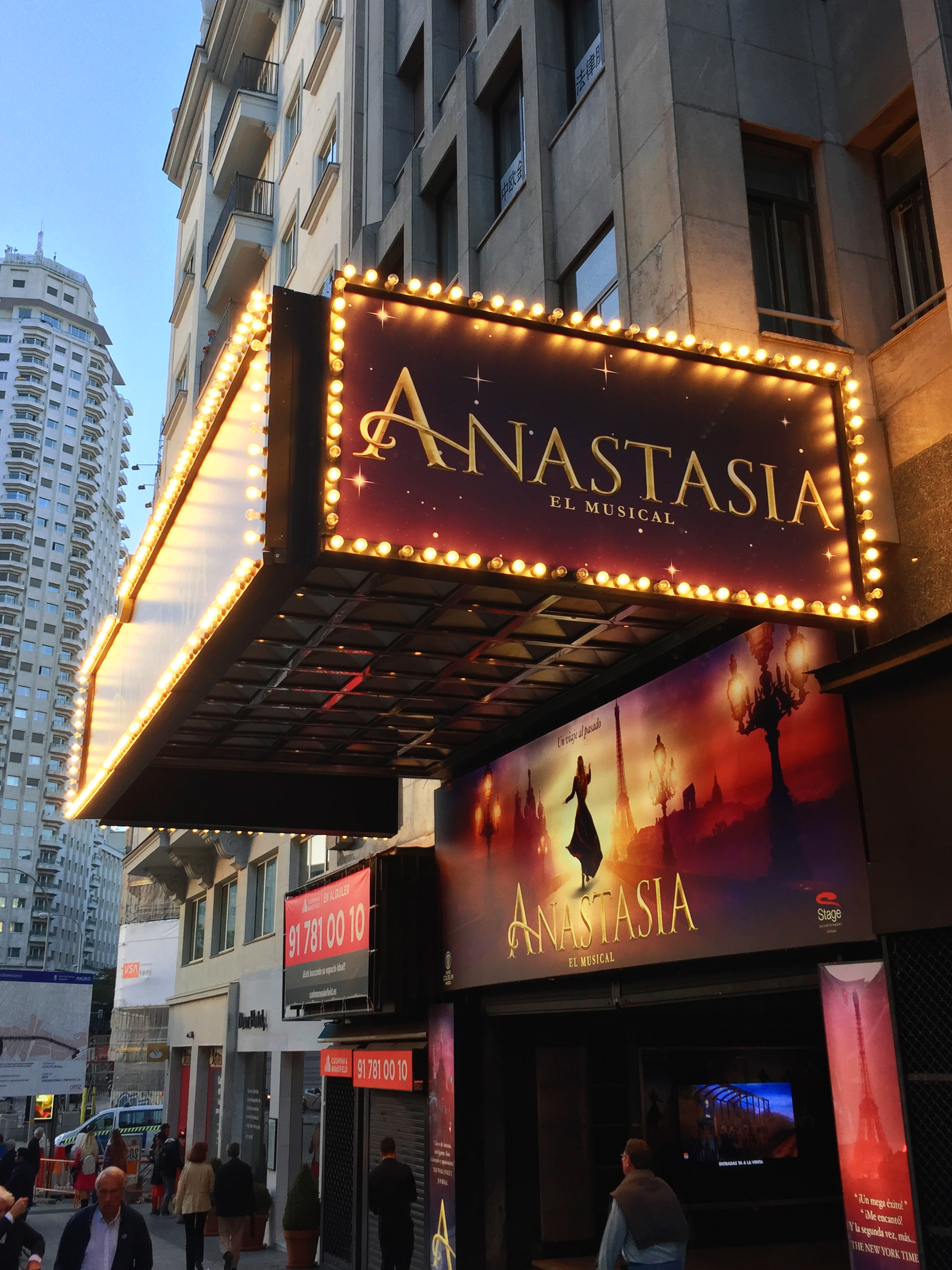
Branding as seen on the Coliseum Theatre in Madrid.

The first European staging opened on October 3, 2018 (officially on October 10) at the Coliseum Theatre in Madrid, Spain, starring Jana Gómez as Anya, Íñigo Etayo as Dmitry, Carlos Salgado as Gleb, Javier Navares as Vlad, Silvia Luchetti as Countess Lily, and Angels Jiménez as Dowager Empress. The production played 556 performances, ending on March 7, 2020, when performances were suspended due to the COVID-19 pandemic. Another production in Spain premiered in Ciudad Real on July 1, 2025.

A German production ran from November 15, 2018, to October 13, 2019, at the Stage Palladium Theater in Stuttgart, starring Judith Caspari as Anya and Milan van Waardenburg as Dmitry.

A Dutch production opened on September 22, 2019, at the AFAS Circustheater in The Hague, the Netherlands. Tessa Sunniva van Tol played the role of Anya with Milan van Waardenburg as Dmitry transferring from the German production to the Dutch production. Other principal roles were played by René van Kooten, Gerrie van der Klei, Ellen Evers and Ad Knippels. The production ran until March 23, 2020, when it was suspended due to the COVID-19 pandemic.

A Japanese production at the Theatre Orb in Tokyo opened on March 9, 2020, but closed on March 27, after 14 performances, due to the pandemic. The cast was led by Wakana Aoi and Haruka Kinoshita as Anya, Naoto Kaiho, Hiroki Aiba and Akiyoshi Utsumi as Dmitry, Koji Yamamoto, Yoshikuni Dochin and Yusuke Tohyama as Gleb, Kenya Osumi and Zen Ishikawa as Vlad, Hikaru Asami, Marcia and Keiko Horiuchi as Countess Lily, and Rei Asami as Dowager Empress. The production was revived in 2023, with engagements at the Theatre Orb (from September 12 to October 7) and Osaka's Umeda Arts Theater (from October 19 to 31).

The all-female Takarazuka Revue staged Anastasia in Takarazuka and Tokyo during the summer of 2020. This version included the new song "She Walks In", written by the original creative team for the character of Dmitry and played by Cosmos Troupe top star Suzuho Makaze.

A Finnish production premiered on September 2, 2022, at the Tampere Theatre, Finland, with Pia Piltz as Anya, Petrus Kähkönen as Dmitry, Joel Mäkinen as Gleb, Ville Majamaa as Vlad, Kaisa Hela as Countess Lily, and Sinikka Sokka as Dowager Empress.

A production opened on September 10, 2022, at the Landestheater in Linz, Austria, starring Hanna Kastner as Anya, Lukas Sandmann as Dmitry, Nikolaj Alexander Brucker as Gleb, Karsten Kenzel as Vlad, Judith Jandl as Countess Lily, and Daniela Dett as Dowager Empress, marking the musical's second German-speaking production.

A Portuguese-language production ran from November 9, 2022, to May 7, 2023, at the Renault Theatre in São Paulo, Brazil, produced by T4F and Caradiboi. The cast was led by Giovanna Rangel as Anya, Rodrigo Filgueiras as Dmitry, Luciano Andrey as Gleb, Tiago Abravanel as Vlad, Carol Costa as Countess Lily and Edna d'Oliveira as Dowager Empress.

On August 3, 2023 Anastasia premiered at Teatro Telcel in Mexico City, produced by OCESA Teatro and starring Mariana Dávila as Anya, Javier Manente as Dmitry, Manu Corta as Vlad, Carlos Quezada as Gleb, Gloria Toba as Countess Lily and Irasema Terrazas as Dowager Empress. The production played its final performance on May 12, 2024.

A Greek-language production ran from December 23, 2023, until February 18, 2024, at Pallas Theatre in Athens. It was adapted and directed by Themis Marsellou and the cast included Demy as Anya, Ian Stratis as Dmitry, Thanasis Tsaltabasis as Vlad, Mirka Papakonstantinou as the Dowager Empress Maria, Katerina Sousoula as Lily, and Vasilis Axiotis as Gleb Vaganov. From March 1–10, the musical was playing at RadioCity Theatre in Thessaloniki, with Fotini Baxevani replacing Mirka Papakonstantinou as the Dowager Empress Maria.

On September 12, 2024, a production opened at the Don Bluth Front Row Theater in Scottsdale, Arizona, directed by Don Bluth, the very person who directed the animated film the musical was based on.

A Danish-language production opened September 2024 at Det Ny Teater, Copenhagen, starring Emilie Groth as Anya, Mathias Hartmann Niclasen as Dmitry, Kim Hammelsvang as Vlad, Marianne Mortensen as the Dowager Empress Maria, Julie Steincke as Lily, and Mikkel Hoé Knudsen as Gleb Vaganov.

Another Spanish-speaking production opened in Panama, from August 6 to August 18 of 2024, with a second season going from November 20 to November 24 of 2024; Starring Mafe Achurra as Anya, Diego de Obaldía as Dmitry, Angel Credidío as Vlad, Nilena Zisopulos as Dowager Empress Maria, Cristina de la Fuente as Lily, and Randy Domínguez as Gleb Vaganov, also featuring Amanda Vega & Isabella Almengor as little Anastasia, and Jesús Medrano as Alexei Romanov. Directed by Aarón Zebede, choreography by Maryelin Barahona and vocal direction by José "Pepe" Casis; It was presented in the National Theatre of Panamá, and was considered a huge success, as we can see from its second season that same year.

An Italian production opened on December 11, 2024, at the Teatro Rossetti in Trieste. It is notable for having costumes that are accurate to the source material.

On 17 February 2025, Christy Altomare, John Bolton, and Mary Beth Peil reprised their Broadway roles in a concert production of Anastasia at Lincoln Center's David Geffen Hall. They were joined by Alex Joseph Grayson as Dmitry, Jordan Donica as Gleb, and Rachel York as Countess Lily.

An Australian tour opened on December 20, 2025 at the Regent Theatre, Melbourne, starring Georgina Hopson as Anya, Robert Tripolino as Dmitry, Joshua Robson as Gleb, Rodney Dobson as Vlad, Rhonda Burchmore as Countess Lily, and Nancye Hayes as Dowager Empress. The Australian tour continued across Crown Theatre, Perth in March 2026, Lyric Theatre, Sydney in April 2026, Festival Theatre, Adelaide in August 2026, and then Queensland Performing Arts Centre, Brisbane in September 2026.

A non-replica production opened on May 5, 2026 at the Teatro Astral in Buenos Aires, directed by Marcelo Rosa and starring Minerva Casero as Anya, Iñaki Aldao as Dmitry, Agustín Iannone as Gleb, Pichu Straneo as Vlad, Carolina Mainero as Countess Lily, and Andrea Mango as Dowager Empress.

== Musical numbers ==
Titles of songs which appeared in the original 1997 animated film are in bold.
Renamed from the Hartford production (#)
Not featured in the cast recordings (+)
Features the melody of "In the Dark of the Night", song from the film (±)
Replaced by a reprise of "Paris Holds the Key (To Your Heart)" in the US tour and international productions (∞)

Act I

Saint Petersburg, 1907, 1917, and 1927

- **"Prologue: Once Upon a December"** – Dowager Empress and Little Anastasia
- "The Last Dance of the Romanovs" – Ensemble #+
- **"A Rumor in St. Petersburg"** – Dmitry, Vlad and Ensemble
- "In My Dreams" – Anya
- "The Rumors Never End" – Gleb and Ensemble +
- **"Learn to Do It"** – Vlad, Anya, and Dmitry
- "The Neva Flows" – Gleb #
- "The Neva Flows (Reprise)" – Men +
- "My Petersburg" – Dmitry and Anya
- **"Once Upon a December"** – Anya and Ensemble
- "A Secret She Kept" – Anya # +
- "Stay, I Pray You" – Count Ipolitov, Anya, Dmitry, Vlad, and Ensemble ±
- "We'll Go From There" – Vlad, Anya, Dmitry, and Ensemble
- "Traveling Sequence" – Gleb, Gorlinsky, Anya, Dmitry, and Vlad +
- "Still" – Gleb
- "**Journey to the Past**" – Anya

Act II

Paris, 1927

- "**Paris Holds the Key (To Your Heart)**" – Vlad, Dmitry, Anya and Ensemble
- "Crossing a Bridge" – Anya ∞
- "Close the Door" – Dowager Empress
- "Land of Yesterday" – Lily and Ensemble
- "The Countess and the Common Man" – Vlad and Lily
- "Land of Yesterday (Reprise)" – Gleb +
- "A Nightmare" – Romanov Children, Tsar and Tsarina +
- "In a Crowd of Thousands" – Dmitry and Anya
- "**Meant to Be**" – Vlad #
- "Quartet at the Ballet" – Anya, Dmitry, Dowager Empress, and Gleb
- "Everything to Win" – Dmitry
- "**Once Upon a December (Reprise)**" – Anya and Dowager Empress
- "The Press Conference" – Lily, Vlad, and Ensemble
- "Everything to Win (Reprise)" – Anya
- "Still/The Neva Flows (Reprise)" – Gleb and Ensemble #
- "Finale" – Company

== Main characters and casts ==
Character	Hartford	Broadway	North American tour	Australian tour
Character	2016	2017	2018	2025
Anya / Anastasia	Christy Altomare	Christy Altomare	Lila Coogan	Georgina Hopson
Dmitry Sudayev	Derek Klena	Derek Klena	Stephen Brower	Robert Tripolino
Vladimir "Vlad" Popov	John Bolton	John Bolton	Edward Staudenmayer	Rodney Dobson
Deputy Commissioner Gleb Vaganov	Manoel Felciano	Ramin Karimloo	Jason Michael Evans	Joshua Robson
Countess Lily Malevsky-Malevitch	Caroline O'Connor	Caroline O'Connor	Tari Kelly	Rhonda Burchmore
Dowager Empress Maria Feodorovna	Mary Beth Peil	Mary Beth Peil	Joy Franz	Nancye Hayes

=== Notable Broadway cast replacements ===
- Dmitry: Cody Simpson
- Gleb Vaganov: Max von Essen
- Countess Lily: Vicki Lewis
- Dowager Empress: Judy Kaye, Penny Fuller

== Critical response ==
The New England Theatre Journal called the premier performance at the Hartford Stage a "slick new theatrical rendition of the story" with "likable characters, lively, tuneful music, expert direction, exciting choreography, uniformly strong performers, and gorgeously designed settings".

The Broadway production was met with mixed to positive reviews. David Rooney, a reviewer for The Hollywood Reporter, considered its opening "quite impressive" but averred that the first act "gets bogged down" and that the music is "more often serviceable than inspired". Entertainment Weekly called the show "fidget-inducing" and "not nearly animated enough". Ben Brantley, reviewing for The New York Times, wrote that Anastasia "trembles nonstop with internal conflicts", which he attributed to its dependence on adapting the 1997 animated film, and argued that audiences without nostalgia for the original film "are likely to find this Anastasia a chore". According to reviewer Julie Lim, the show "falls flat of being a memorable musical" and that its simultaneous departure from and dependence on elements of the animated film leave it in "a limbo of its source material and deviations" that is "stuck failing to please both those who want a faithful adaptation and those who want a fresh take".

Variety considered the Broadway performance "sharpened" compared to the Hartford premiere and praised its "sophisticated staging". Jose Solís, reviewing Anastasia for The New York Times International Edition, complimented the show and argued that "its charms outweigh its imperfections". iHeartRadio praised the "costumes, amazing voices and comedic moments" and called the show "two hours of laughter, suspense and some real amazing singing". Entertainment Weekly reviewer Caitlin Brody noted that though she criticized the musical, her sentiment "didn’t seem to be shared with the crowd" who according to Brody responded favorably to the show. Reviewer Lim concluded that "every musical has its redeeming qualities" and praised the characters Vlad and Countess Lily, who "carry the physical comedy of the show". Solís considered Christy Altomare's performance as Anastasia the show's highlight, calling her "exactly the Anastasia I dreamed of as a kid [who watched the 1997 movie], all spunk and heart, fierce and regal, with a voice to match". Variety praised Altomare's "vocal strength" and favorably compared her to Julie Andrews.

== Awards and honors ==
=== 2016 Hartford Stage production ===
Year	Award	Category	Nominee	Result
2016	Connecticut Critics Circle Award	Outstanding Production of a Musical		Won
2016	Connecticut Critics Circle Award	Outstanding Lead Actress in a Musical	Christy Altomare	Won
2016	Connecticut Critics Circle Award	Outstanding Featured Actor in a Musical	John Bolton	Nominated
2016	Connecticut Critics Circle Award	Outstanding Featured Actress in a Musical	Caroline O'Connor	Nominated
2016	Connecticut Critics Circle Award	Outstanding Featured Actress in a Musical	Mary Beth Peil	Nominated
2016	Connecticut Critics Circle Award	Outstanding Director of a Musical	Darko Tresnjak	Won
2016	Connecticut Critics Circle Award	Outstanding Choreography	Peggy Hickey	Won
2016	Connecticut Critics Circle Award	Outstanding Scenic Design	Alexander Dodge	Nominated
2016	Connecticut Critics Circle Award	Outstanding Costume Design	Linda Cho	Won
2016	Connecticut Critics Circle Award	Outstanding Lighting Design	Donald Holder	Nominated
2016	Connecticut Critics Circle Award	Outstanding Sound Design	Brian Ronan	Nominated
2016	Connecticut Critics Circle Award	Outstanding Projection Design	Aaron Rhyne	Won

=== 2017 Broadway production ===
Year	Award	Category	Nominee	Result
2017	Tony Award	Best Featured Actress in a Musical	Mary Beth Peil	Nominated
2017	Tony Award	Best Costume Design in a Musical	Linda Cho	Nominated
2017	Drama Desk Awards	Outstanding Musical		Nominated
2017	Drama Desk Awards	Outstanding Actress in a Musical	Christy Altomare	Nominated
2017	Drama Desk Awards	Outstanding Featured Actress in a Musical	Mary Beth Peil	Nominated
2017	Drama Desk Awards	Outstanding Book of a Musical	Terrence McNally	Nominated
2017	Drama Desk Awards	Outstanding Music	Stephen Flaherty	Nominated
2017	Drama Desk Awards	Outstanding Costume Design for a Musical	Linda Cho	Nominated
2017	Drama Desk Awards	Outstanding Orchestrations	Doug Besterman	Nominated
2017	Drama Desk Awards	Outstanding Projection Design	Aaron Rhyne	Won
2017	Drama Desk Awards	Outstanding Sound Design in a Musical	Peter Hylenski	Nominated
2017	Drama League Award	Outstanding Production of a Broadway or Off-Broadway Musical		Nominated
2017	Drama League Award	Distinguished Performance Award	Caroline O'Connor	Nominated
2017	Outer Critics Circle Award	Outstanding New Broadway Musical		Nominated
2017	Outer Critics Circle Award	Outstanding Actress in a Musical	Christy Altomare	Nominated
2017	Outer Critics Circle Award	Outstanding Featured Actor in a Musical	John Bolton	Nominated
2017	Outer Critics Circle Award	Outstanding Featured Actress in a Musical	Caroline O'Connor	Nominated
2017	Outer Critics Circle Award	Outstanding Featured Actress in a Musical	Mary Beth Peil	Nominated
2017	Outer Critics Circle Award	Outstanding Book of a Musical	Terrence McNally	Nominated
2017	Outer Critics Circle Award	Outstanding New Score	Stephen Flaherty & Lynn Ahrens	Nominated
2017	Outer Critics Circle Award	Outstanding Director of a Musical	Darko Tresnjak	Nominated
2017	Outer Critics Circle Award	Outstanding Set Design	Alexander Dodge	Nominated
2017	Outer Critics Circle Award	Outstanding Costume Design	Linda Cho	Nominated
2017	Outer Critics Circle Award	Outstanding Lighting Design	Donald Holder	Nominated
2017	Outer Critics Circle Award	Outstanding Projection Design	Aaron Rhyne	Won
2017	Outer Critics Circle Award	Outstanding Orchestrations	Doug Besterman	Nominated
2017	Theatre World Award	Outstanding Broadway Debut Performance	Christy Altomare	Honoree
2017	Chita Rivera Awards for Dance and Choreography	Outstanding Male Dancer in a Broadway Show	John Bolton	Nominated

== Bibliography ==
- Klein, Sabine Macris (2016). "Hartford Stage Hartford, Connecticut, 2015–2016". New England Theatre Journal. 27: 150–153. ProQuest 2087653084.
