= Christy Altomare =

American actress and singer-songwriter

- Altomare in 2015
- Born: Christine Altomare; June 23, 1986 (age 40); Bucks County, Pennsylvania, U.S
- Education: University of Cincinnati (BFA)
- Occupations: Actress, singer-songwriter
- Spouse: Chris Crook (m. 2022)
- Children: 2
- Website: www.christyaltomare.com

Christine "Christy" Altomare (born June 23, 1986) is an American actress and singer-songwriter.

Altomare played Wendla in the first national tour of the rock musical Spring Awakening, played Sue Snell in the off-Broadway revival of Carrie, and made her Broadway debut as Sophie in Mamma Mia!. She originated the title role in the Broadway premiere of Anastasia, earning favorable reviews. The show closed on Broadway on March 31, 2019, after a total of 808 regular shows and 34 previews.

== Early life ==
Altomare was born in Bucks County, Pennsylvania. Altomare began performing at age five in community theater productions in Bucks County, Pennsylvania. At Pennsbury High School, she was a part of choirs and school productions before attending University of Cincinnati's Conservatory of Music, where she performed in a number of productions. In 2004, she was a National Foundation for Advancement in the Arts winner in the musical theater category. She graduated from CCM in 2008 with a BFA in musical theater.

== Career ==
Altomare began writing songs at the age of twelve. She has three independent CDs: Not Yet Over You (2000), Waiting For You (2007), and an EP entitled After You (2008). When she was sixteen, she signed with her current manager, Edie Robb. She looks to Jewel and Joni Mitchell as her biggest influences.

In 2008, Altomare joined the first national touring cast of the Broadway musical Spring Awakening in the lead role of Wendla, beginning previews on August 15, 2008, in San Diego. She traveled to 44 different cities and gave over 600 performances. She stayed with the tour until its final performance on May 23, 2010. Altomare received generally positive reviews throughout the tour. Seth Kubersky of Orlando Weekly called her "appropriately innocent and adorable as the inevitable victim" while Eric Rezsnyak of the Rochester City Paper praised her "piercing, haunting soprano voice," and how "even her most difficult melodic passes seem totally effortless."

Following the Spring Awakening tour, Altomare appeared as Sue Snell in MCC Theater's limited-engagement run of the Off-Broadway revival of Carrie at the Lucille Lortel Theatre. She can be heard on the official cast recording of the production, released by Ghostlight Records. On June 4, 2012, Altomare made her Broadway debut in Mamma Mia! at the Winter Garden Theater, where she replaced Liana Hunt in the role of Sophie Sheridan. She stayed with the Broadway company for a year, ending her contract on June 1, 2013, and was replaced by Laurie Veldheer.

From October 30, 2014, until January 4, 2015, Altomare starred as Guinevere in the Drury Lane Theater's production of Camelot.

On March 9, 2016, it was announced that Altomare would star in the world premiere of the musical adaptation of the 1997 animated film Anastasia in the title role (nicknamed Anya). The show ran from May 13 to June 19, 2016, at Hartford Stage in Connecticut. Altomare received critical acclaim for her performance, winning the Connecticut Critics Circle Award. She reprised the role on Broadway at the Broadhurst Theater. Previews began March 23, 2017, and the show officially opened April 24, 2017. Altomare's performance in the Broadway production earned her positive reviews and numerous award wins and nominations including a 2017 Drama Desk Award nomination for Outstanding Leading Actress in a Musical. During Anastasia's run, Altomare filmed a series of video blogs for Broadway.com titled Royal Misfits: Backstage at Anastasia with Christy Altomare, giving an inside look at life backstage at the production. She continued with the production through its final Broadway performance, on March 31, 2019.

Altomare played Nellie in a concert version of South Pacific at the Aspen Music Festival on July 22, 2019.

Since the closing of Anastasia, Altomare has performed frequently in the Broadway Princess Party concert both in New York City and occasionally touring in selected cities across North America alongside fellow original Broadway princesses Laura Osnes, Susan Egan, Courtney Reed, and more.

On January 16, 2020, it was announced that Altomare would star in the new musical The Wanderer as Susan alongside Wicked alums Michael Wartella as Dion DiMucci and Joey McIntyre as Johnny, running May 28 through June 28 at Paper Mill Playhouse prior to a Broadway transfer. However, the production was pushed back to 2021 due to the COVID-19 pandemic.

In February 2021, Altomare announced that she would release a solo album of original music, titled Wandering Bird, later that year. On April 9th, 2021, Altomare released the album as a surprise drop on her YouTube music page and on Spotify.

Altomare was cast in the role of Scarlet in the world premier of "Noir" on the Hubbard Stage of the Alley Theater in Houston, Texas. The show ran from June 2, 2022 to July 3, 2022.

== Personal life ==
In December 2018, Altomare announced her engagement to longtime boyfriend Philip “Pete” Browning. She announced their separation in October 2020.

On February 7, 2022, Altomare announced her engagement to Chris Crook. The couple went to middle school together before reconnecting after one of Altomare's shows in 2021. They married in September 2022, at the Lambertville Station in Lambertville, New Jersey. They have a son named Preston, born mid-2023 and a daughter named Bella, born early 2026.

== Theater credits ==
Theater Credits
Year	Title	Theater	Role	Notes
2008-10	Spring Awakening	Various theatres across North America	Wendla Bergmann	Original 1st National Tour Cast
2012	Carrie	Lucille Lortel Theatre	Sue Snell	Off-Broadway Revival Cast
2012-13	Mamma Mia!	Winter Garden Theater	Sophie Sheridan	Replacement Broadway Cast
2014-15	Camelot	Drury Lane Theater	Queen Guinevere	Regional
2016	Anastasia	Hartford Stage	Anya / Anastasia	World Premiere Regional Cast
2017-19	Anastasia	Broadhurst Theatre	Anya / Anastasia	Original Broadway Cast
2019	South Pacific	Aspen Music Festival	Nellie Forbush	Concert
2022	Noir	Alley Theater	Scarlett	World Premiere Regional Cast
2022	The Wanderer	Papermill Playhouse	Susan	World Premiere Regional Cast
2025	Anastasia	David Geffen Hall	Anya / Anastasia	Concert

== Discography ==
- Not Yet Over You (2000)
- Waiting For You (2007)
- After You: LA Sessions - EP (2009)
- Wandering Bird (2021)

== Awards and nominations ==
Year	Award	Category	Work	Result
2016	Connecticut Critics Circle Award	Outstanding Lead Actress in a Musical	Anastasia	Won
2017	Drama Desk Award	Outstanding Actress in a Musical	Anastasia	Nominated
2017	Outer Critics Circle Award	Outstanding Actress in a Musical	Anastasia	Nominated
2017	Theater World Award		Anastasia	Honoree
2017	Broadway.com Audience Award	Best Leading Actress in a Musical	Anastasia	Nominated
2017	Broadway.com Audience Award	Best Onstage Pair (w/ Derek Klena)	Anastasia	Nominated
2017	Broadway.com Audience Award	Broadway.com Star Of The Year	Anastasia	Won
