= Jonathan Dokuchitz =

American actor

- Occupation: Actor
- Years active: 1987–present

Jonathan Dokuchitz is an American actor who works mainly on Broadway. He has starred in The Who's Tommy as Captain Walker, and also was the singing voice for John Cusack's Dimitri in Anastasia.

== Featured productions ==
He has voiced characters in several animated films including Anastasia (1997), The Hunchback of Notre Dame (1996), and Pocahontas (1995). He has been part of many productions on Broadway, including The Who's Tommy, which earned five Tony Awards. He has also starred in several television programmes. He played Danny in the episode 'The Agony and the Ex-tacy' of 'Sex and the City'. He also played Barry Janis in the episode 'The Ultimatum' in The $treet.

In 2017, he had moved out of New York and was living in Gilbertsville, New York.

== Musical theatre ==
Year	Work	Role	Composer	Notes
1987–1989	Into the Woods	u/s The Wolf, Rapunzel's Prince, Jack	Stephen Sondheim	Broadway
1990–1991	Aspects of Love	Hugo Le Muenier / Stage Manager / Alex's Friend	Andrew Lloyd Webber	Broadway
1992	The Who's Tommy	Captain Walker	Pete Townshend and Des McAnuff	La Jolla Playhouse
1993	The Who's Tommy	Captain Walker	Pete Townshend and Des McAnuff	Broadway
1995	Company	Peter	Stephen Sondheim	Broadway
1997	Into the Woods	Rapunzel's Prince	Stephen Sondheim	Broadway Tenth Anniversary Concert
2001	The IT Girl	Jonathan Waltham	Paul McKibbin	Off-Broadway
2002	The Boy's From Syracuse	Antipholus of Syracuse	Richard Rodgers	Broadway
2003	Falsettos	Whizzer	Playwrights Horizons	Concert
2003	The Look of Love	Performer	Burt Bacharach and Hal David	Broadway
2003	Chess	Walter de Courcey	Benny Andersson and Björn Ulvaeus	Broadway Concert
2003	Children of Eden	Adam / Noah	Stephen Schwartz	Concert
2004–2007	Hairspray	Corny Collins	Marc Shaiman	Broadway
2008	The Who's Tommy	Captain Walker	Pete Townshend and Des McAnuff	Broadway Concert
2019	The Who's Tommy	Captain Walker	Pete Townshend and Des McAnuff	La Jolla Playhouse

== Filmography ==
=== Film ===
Year	Title	Role	Notes
1995	Pocahontas		Voice
1996	The Hunchback of Notre Dame	Frollo's soldier	Voice
1997	Anastasia	Dimitri	Singing Voice
1998	The Secret of Mulan		Voice
2002	Two Weeks Notice	Tom	
2006	Griffin & Phoenix	Man on Street	
2006	The Good Shepherd	Husband Dinner Guest	(final film role)

=== Television ===
Year	Title	Role	Notes
2000	The Wonderful World of Disney	Featured	Episode: "Geppeto"
2000	Ed	Dancer #1	Episode: "Pretty Girls and Waffles"
2000	The $treet	Barry Janis	Episode: "The Ultimatum"
2001	Sex and the City	Danny	Episode: "The Agony and the Ex-tacy"
