= Jan Horvath =

American singer (born 1958)

Jan Horvath (born 31 January 1958) is an American singer.

She was a member of the original Broadway company of The Phantom of the Opera where she understudied and performed the roles of Christine and Carlotta. Her other Broadway credits include The Threepenny Opera, Sweet Charity, Stardust, and Oliver! In addition to her Broadway credits, Horvath sang the leading role of Grizabella in the National Touring Company of Cats. Off-Broadway credits include the Mother in Yoko Ono's New York Rock and Svetlana in the revised version of Chess.
