= Derek Klena =

American actor, singer, and baseball player

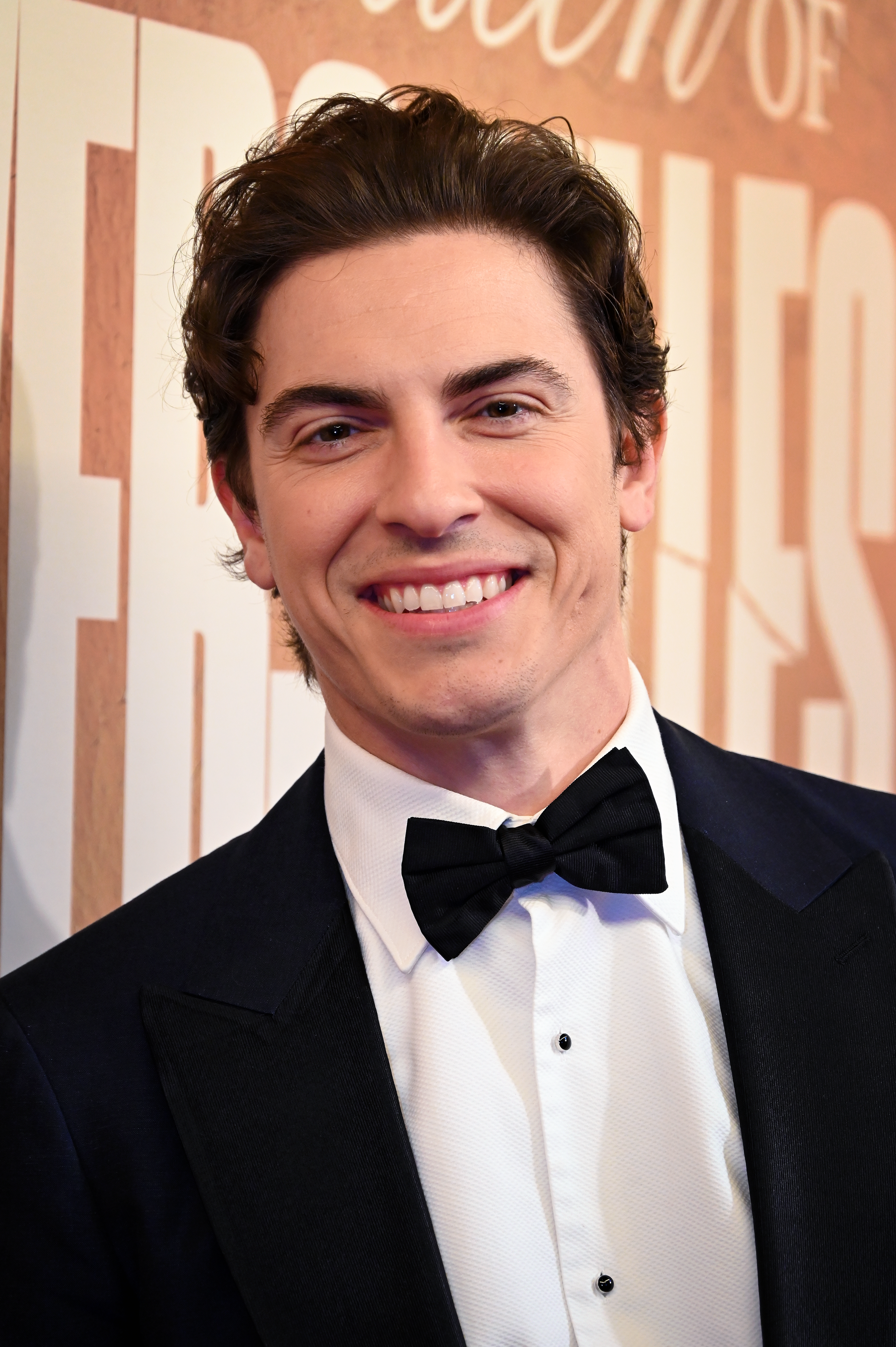
- Klena in 2025
- Born: Derek Anthony Klena; October 3, 1991 (age 35); San Dimas, California, U.S.
- Education: South Hills High School; University of California, Los Angeles
- Occupations: Actor, singer, baseball player
- Years active: 2009–present
- Known for: Anastasia; Moulin Rouge! Jagged Little Pill
- Spouse: Elycia Scriven (m. 2018)
- Children: 2
- Baseball career

Savannah Bananas – No. 24
- Relief pitcher
- Bats: Right Throws: Right

BBCL statistics (through 2026)
- Win–loss: 1–0
- ERA: 21.94
- Strikeouts: 1

Teams
- Savannah Bananas (2026–present)

Derek Anthony Klena (born October 3, 1991) is an American actor, singer, and professional baseball player. He is best known for his work on Broadway, including originating the roles of Nick Healy in Jagged Little Pill (2019–2021), Dmitry in Anastasia (2017–2018), and Michael in The Bridges of Madison County (2014). His breakthrough was in the original Off-Broadway production of Pasek & Paul's stage adaptation of Dogfight, and he made his Broadway debut as Fiyero in the 10th anniversary company of Wicked. Klena’s most recent Broadway credits include Christian in Moulin Rouge! (2022–2024) replacing Aaron Tveit and Jay Gatsby in The Great Gatsby (2026–2027) replacing Ryan McCartan. He has made appearances on several television series such as Unbreakable Kimmy Schmidt, The Code, and Pretty Little Liars.

In 2020, Klena was nominated for a Tony Award for Best Featured Actor in a Musical for his portrayal of Nick Healy in Jagged Little Pill.

== Life and career ==
Klena was born in San Dimas, California. He grew up with his two younger siblings in West Covina, California, outside of Los Angeles, where he attended South Hills High School. His brother, Dillon, is also an actor. He is from a Jewish family.

Klena attended the University of California, Los Angeles where he initially studied theater but switched his major to psychology. His freshman year he played baseball before seriously pursuing acting and auditioning. From 2009 to 2011, he took part in regional Southern California theater. He participated in American Idol's ninth season. Around 2010, Klena was invited to audition as a standby for Aaron Tveit in the Broadway musical Catch Me If You Can after show producer Marc Shaiman contacted Klena regarding a cover he did of its song "Goodbye" at a Los Angeles cabaret show. He did not get cast but was subsequently invited to audition for the workshop of Carrie. He took a leave of absence at UCLA in his junior year to take part in the 2012 Off-Broadway revival of Carrie.

He originated the role of Eddie Birdlace in the stage adaptation of Dogfight. In 2013, he played Fiyero in the 10th anniversary company of Wicked on Broadway. Subsequently, he played son Michael Johnson in the original Broadway musical The Bridges of Madison County.

In 2014, he was cast in the pre-Broadway musical adaptation of the 1982 film Diner at the Signature Theatre in Virginia. Adapted by original screenwriter Barry Levinson and with music by Sheryl Crow, the musical originally planned to open on Broadway but did not transfer.

In 2016, he was cast to star as Dmitry in the original production of Anastasia, the stage musical adaptation of the animated film of the same name. Premiering in Hartford, Connecticut, in March 2016, it opened on Broadway in April 2017. After a year with the production, he left to take part in the original Cambridge, Massachusetts, production of Jagged Little Pill, a musical based on the music of Alanis Morissette. The Broadway production opened in December 2019. Klena was nominated for a Tony Award for Best Featured Actor in a Musical for his portrayal of Nick Healy. The show went on hiatus in March 2020 and reopened in October 2021 but closed a few months later due to the Omicron surge in New York City.

In May 2022, he replaced Aaron Tveit as Christian in Moulin Rouge! on Broadway. He left the cast in January 2023 and returned in April that same year for three months. In February 2023, he starred as Joe Gillis opposite Stephanie J. Block as Norma in Sunset Boulevard at the Kennedy Center. On 8 January 2024, it was announced Klena would return to Moulin Rouge! on 6 February replacing Casey Cott. He left the cast on 21 July. Klena returned to the role of Fiyero in Wicked for a limited engagement lasting from May 27-June 8, 2025.

In December 2025, it was announced that Klena had been selected as an entertainment player and pitcher for the Savannah Bananas of Banana Ball Championship League.

== Personal life ==
Klena resides in New York City. He married his longtime girlfriend Elycia Scriven in 2018. In April 2022, Klena and his wife announced that they were expecting their first child. The couple welcomed a son, Dax Arthur Klena, on September 8, 2022. Their second son, Otto, was born in 2024.

== Stage credits ==
Selected credits

Year	Title	Role	Venue	Notes
2009	Big River	Huckleberry Finn	Candlelight Pavilion Dinner Theatre	
2009	High School Musical	Troy Bolton	Candlelight Pavilion Dinner Theatre	
2010	Joseph and the Amazing Technicolor Dreamcoat	Joseph	Performance Riverside	
2011	Glory Days	Will	Lillian Theatre	Los Angeles Revival
2011	Hairspray	Ensemble	Hollywood Bowl	
2011	Hairspray	Link Larkin	Carpenter Performing Arts Center	
2012	Carrie	Tommy Ross	Lucille Lortel Theatre	Off-Broadway
2012	Dogfight	Eddie Birdlace	Second Stage Theater	Off-Broadway
2013	Wicked	Fiyero Tigelaar	Gershwin Theatre	Broadway replacement
2014	The Bridges of Madison County	Michael Johnson	Gerald Schoenfeld Theatre	Original Broadway cast
2014–2015	Diner	Boogie	Signature Theatre	
2015	Unknown Soldier	Francis Grand	Williamstown Theatre Festival	
2015	Diner	Boogie	Delaware Theatre Company	
2016	Anastasia	Dmitry	Hartford Stage	Out-of-town tryout
2017–2018	Anastasia	Dmitry	Broadhurst Theatre	Original Broadway cast
2018	Jagged Little Pill	Nick Healy	American Repertory Theater	Out-of-town tryout
2019–2020	Jagged Little Pill	Nick Healy	Broadhurst Theatre	Original Broadway cast
2021	Jagged Little Pill	Nick Healy	Broadhurst Theatre	Original Broadway cast
2022–2023	Moulin Rouge! The Musical	Christian	Al Hirschfeld Theatre	Broadway replacement
2023	Sunset Boulevard	Joe Gillis	Kennedy Center	
2023	Moulin Rouge! The Musical	Christian	Al Hirschfeld Theatre	Broadway replacement
2024	Glory Days	Andy	Symphony Space	Off-Broadway
2024	Moulin Rouge! The Musical	Christian	Al Hirschfeld Theatre	Broadway replacement
2025	Wicked	Fiyero Tigelaar	Gershwin Theatre	Broadway replacement
2025	The Bridges of Madison County	Michael Johnson	Carnegie Hall	Reunion concert
2026–2027	The Great Gatsby	Jay Gatsby	Broadway Theatre	Broadway replacement

== Filmography ==
=== Television ===
Year	Title	Role	Notes
2013	The Tomorrow People	Dylan	Episode: "Pilot"
2014	The Carrie Diaries	Pvt. Robert Watson	Episode: "Date Expectations"
2015	Law & Order: SVU	Connor Howell	Episode: "Devastating Story"
2015	One Bad Choice	Drew	Episode: "Stephan Perez"
2016–2018	Unbreakable Kimmy Schmidt	Douglas Fingablast / DJ Fingablast	3 episodes
2016	Blue Bloods	Cormac Phillips	Episode: "Down the Rabbit Hole"
2016	Last Week Tonight with John Oliver	Brandon Schmidt	Episode: "Doping"
2016	Quantico	Eric Boyer	Episode: "Kubark"
2019	The Code	Adam Turnbull / Lt. Adam Turnbull	5 episodes
2022–2024	Pretty Little Liars	Wes	Recurring role
2022	A Holiday Spectacular	John	Television Film
2024	Private Princess Christmas	Ryan Douglas	Television Film

== Awards and nominations ==
Year	Award	Category	Work	Result
2012	Clive Barnes Award	Clive Barnes Award for Theatre	Dogfight	Nominated
2020	Tony Award	Best Performance by a Featured Actor in a Musical	Jagged Little Pill	Nominated
2023	Broadway.com Audience Choice Award	Favorite Replacement	Moulin Rouge	Won
