= Anastasia (1997 film) =

1997 film by Don Bluth and Gary Goldman

- Theatrical release poster
- Directed by: Don Bluth; Gary Goldman
- Screenplay by: Susan Gauthier; Bruce Graham; Bob Tzudiker; Noni White
- Adaptation by: Eric Tuchman
- Based on: Anastasia by Arthur Laurents; Anastasia by Marcelle Maurette
- Produced by: Don Bluth; Gary Goldman
- Starring: Meg Ryan; John Cusack; Kelsey Grammer; Christopher Lloyd; Hank Azaria; Bernadette Peters; Kirsten Dunst; Angela Lansbury
- Edited by: Bob Bender; Fiona Trayler
- Music by: David Newman
- Production companies: Fox Family Films; Fox Animation Studios
- Distributed by: 20th Century Fox
- Release dates: November 14, 1997 (Ziegfeld Theater); November 21, 1997 (United States)
- Running time: 94 minutes
- Country: United States
- Language: English
- Budget: $53 million
- Box office: $140 million

Anastasia is a 1997 American animated musical historical fantasy film directed and produced by Don Bluth and Gary Goldman from a screenplay by the writing teams of Susan Gauthier and Bruce Graham, and Bob Tzudiker and Noni White, and based on a story adaptation by Eric Tuchman. It features songs written by Stephen Flaherty and Lynn Ahrens (in their film songwriting debut), and a musical score composed and conducted by David Newman. The film stars the voices of Meg Ryan, John Cusack, Kelsey Grammer, Christopher Lloyd, Hank Azaria, Bernadette Peters, Kirsten Dunst, and Angela Lansbury. Set in an alternate 1926, it follows an amnesiac Anastasia Romanov who embarks on a journey to discover her past.

Anastasia was the first 20th Century Fox animated feature to be produced by its own animation division, 20th Century Fox Animation, through its subsidiary Fox Animation Studios. The film premiered at the Ziegfeld Theater in New York City on November 14, 1997, and was released in the United States on November 21. The film received generally positive reviews from critics, who praised the animation, voice performances, and soundtrack, though it attracted criticism from some historians for its fantastical retelling of the Grand Duchess. Anastasia grossed $140 million worldwide, making it the most profitable film from Bluth and Fox Animation Studios. It received nominations for several awards, including for Best Original Song ("Journey to the Past") and Best Original Musical or Comedy Score at the 70th Academy Awards.

The success of Anastasia spawned a franchise, including a direct-to-video spin-off in 1999 and a stage musical adaptation in 2016.

== Plot ==
In 1916, at a ball in Saint Petersburg, Russia, celebrating the Romanov tricentennial, Dowager Empress Marie gives a music box and a necklace inscribed with the words "Together in Paris" as parting gifts to her youngest granddaughter, Grand Duchess Anastasia. The ball is suddenly interrupted by Grigori Rasputin, the Romanovs' former royal advisor who was exiled for treason. Seeking revenge, Rasputin sold his soul in exchange for the power to kill the Romanovs, which manifests in an unholy reliquary that he uses to start the Russian Revolution. As the palace is attacked, Marie and Anastasia flee through a hidden door opened by a servant boy. However, Anastasia drops her music box in the process. Rasputin confronts the two royals on the frozen Little Nevka river, only to fall through the ice and drown. The pair reaches a moving train; Marie climbs aboard, but Anastasia falls and hits her head while also trying to board, giving her amnesia.

Ten years later, rumors of Anastasia's survival spreads throughout Russia, and Marie offers 10 million rubles for her safe return. A con-artist named Dimitri and his partner-in-crime, former nobleman Vladimir (called "Vlad") search for an Anastasia look-alike so they can collect the reward. Elsewhere, a now grown-up Anastasia (now called "Anya") leaves the rural orphanage where she has been living since her amnesia. Accompanied by a stray puppy she names Pooka, she decides to head to Paris to uncover her past, inspired by the inscription on her necklace, but learns she needs an exit visa. An old woman advises her to see Dimitri at the abandoned palace; there, Dimitri and Vlad are impressed by Anya's resemblance to the "real" Anastasia and decide to take her to Paris.

Rasputin's immortal albino bat sidekick, Bartok, is nearby and notices the reliquary revived by Anya's presence; it drags him to limbo, where he finds Rasputin has survived. Enraged to hear that Anastasia is still alive, Rasputin sends his demonic minions from the reliquary to kill her. They sabotage the trio's train as it leaves St. Petersburg by overheating the train engine, but they survive. The trio transfer to a boat, where the demons try to lure Anya into sleepwalking off the ship, which also fails. Rasputin and Bartok are forced to travel back to the surface to kill Anya themselves. Meanwhile, as Dimitri and Vlad teach Anya court etiquette and the Romanov family's history, Dimitri and Anya begin to fall in love.

The trio eventually reaches Paris and visits Marie, who had decided to give up on finding Anastasia after meeting numerous impostors. Despite this, Marie's cousin Sophie quizzes Anya to confirm her identity. Though Anya gives every answer taught to her, Dimitri finally realizes she is the real Anastasia when she vaguely recalls him helping her escape the palace siege. Sophie, also convinced, arranges a meeting with Marie at the Palais Garnier where they watch the Russian ballet version of Cinderella. There, Dimitri tries to establish an introduction but Marie refuses, having heard of his initial scheme to find an Anastasia lookalike. Anya overhears their conversation, confronts Dimitri and leaves. Dimitri abducts Marie in her car to force her to see Anya, finally convincing her when he presents the music box which he has been keeping as a memento. As Marie and Anya converse, Anya regains her memories; the pair sings the lullaby the music box plays, and are joyfully reunited.

Marie offers Dimitri the reward, recognizing him as the servant boy who saved them, but he declines. Intending to return to St. Petersburg, he bids Vlad farewell. At Anastasia's return celebration, Marie informs her of Dimitri's gesture, leaving Anastasia torn between staying in Paris and returning to St. Petersburg with Dimitri. Anastasia is then lured to the Pont Alexandre III, where Rasputin and his minions attack her, though Bartok refuses to help. Dimitri returns to save her but is injured and knocked unconscious. In the struggle, with Pooka's help, Anastasia takes Rasputin's reliquary and crushes it, avenging her family as Rasputin disintegrates and dies. In the aftermath, Anastasia and Dimitri reconcile; they elope, and Anastasia sends a farewell letter to Marie and Sophie, promising to return.

== Voice cast ==
- Meg Ryan as Anya / Anastasia, an amnesiac Russian grand duchess, youngest daughter of Tsar Nicholas II and granddaughter of Maria Feodorovna, who sets out on a journey to re-discover her past. In the Russian dub, she is called Nastya instead of Anya because Nastya (На́стя, Nástya) is the actual Russian nickname for Anastasia, while Anya (А́ня, Ánya) is actually the Russian nickname for Anna.
  - Liz Callaway provides the singing voice for Anya / Anastasia.
  - Kirsten Dunst provides the speaking voice for young Anastasia.
  - Lacey Chabert provides the singing voice for young Anastasia.
- John Cusack as Dimitri, a con-artist, former servant of the Romanovs, and Anya's love interest.
  - Jonathan Dokuchitz provides the singing voice for Dimitri.
  - Glenn Walker Harris Jr. provides the voice for young Dimitri.
- Kelsey Grammer as Vladimir Vanya "Vlad" Vonitsky Vasilovich, a former nobleman-turned-con-artist and friend of Dimitri.
  In the Russian dub, his name is Vladimir "Vlad" Nikolayevich Voynitskiy (Влади́мир «Вла́д» Никола́евич Войни́цкий, Vladímir «Vlád» Nikoláyevich Voynítskiy).
- Christopher Lloyd as Grigori Rasputin, a megalomaniac lich-sorcerer and the former advisor of the Romanovs, who casts a curse upon the family when they exile him for treason.
  - Jim Cummings provides the singing voice of Rasputin.
- Hank Azaria as Bartok, Rasputin's mild-mannered sidekick who is a talking, immortal albino bat, and serves as the film's comic relief. In the Russian dub, his name is also Bartok (Ба́рток, Bártok), even though it is not an actual Russian name.
- Angela Lansbury as Maria Feodorovna, the Dowager Empress, mother of Nicholas II, and Anya's paternal grandmother.
- Bernadette Peters as Sophie Stanislovskievna Somorkov-Smirnoff, Maria's first cousin and lady-in-waiting.
  In the Russian dub, her name is Sófia "Sofí" Stanislavovna Sumarokova-Smirnova (Со́фья «Софи́» Станисла́вовна Сумаро́кова-Смирно́ва, Sóf’ya «Sofí» Stanislávovna Sumarókova-Smirnóva).
- Andrea Martin as:
  - "Comrade" Phlegmenkoff, the orphanage's inconsiderate owneress. In the Russian dub, her name is Comrade Búfferkova (Това́рищ Бу́феркова, Továrishtch Búferkova). If they would have used the original name, then her name would have been Comrade Flegménkova (Това́рищ Флегме́нкова, Továrishtch Flegménkova) in Russian.
  - An old woman at the train station who directs Anya where to find Dimitri for a passage to Paris.
- Rick Jones as:
  - Nicholas II, the last Tsar of Imperial Russia and Anastasia's father.
  - A revolutionary soldier.
  - A servant.
  - A ticket agent.
- Charity James as an Anastasia imposter.
- Debra Mooney as an Actress.
- Arthur Malet as:
  - Traveling Man.
  - The Romanovs' Majordomo.
- Frank Welker as:
  - Pooka, Anastasia's pet. In the Russian dub, his name is Pushok (Пушо́к, Pushók), which means "Fluff".
  - The Black Pegasus.

Victoria Clark, Billy Porter, Patrick Quinn, J. K. Simmons, and Lillias White were among the ensemble and character voices. Eric Bogosian voiced Lazingo, Rasputin's pet raven, in deleted scenes.

== Background ==
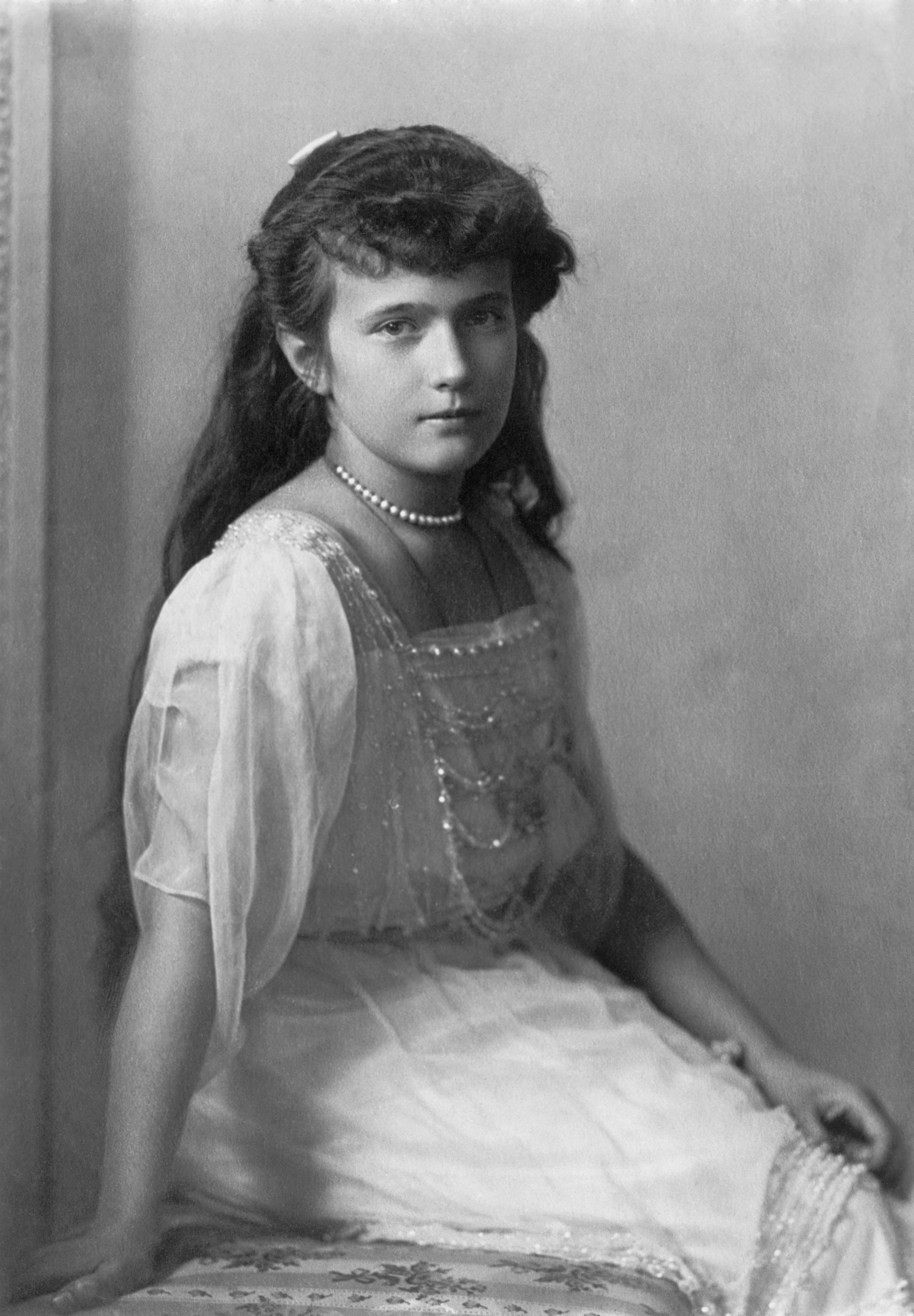
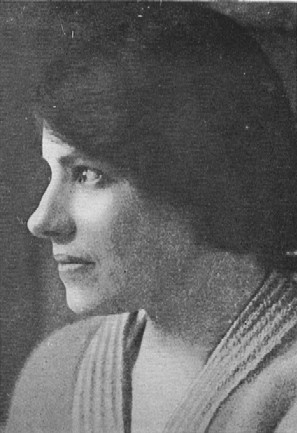
Left: Grand Duchess Anastasia Nikolayevna
Right: Anna Anderson in 1922

In the years since the Russian Imperial Romanov family's death in July 1918, the phenomenon of Anastasia impostors began to appear. The most well-known imposter was Anna Anderson, who claimed to be Anastasia in 1922. A few surviving members of the Romanovs met with Anderson and the family were divided on the truth of her identity. In 1991, Anastasia Nikolayevna's remains were discovered, and through DNA testing, Anderson's true identity was verified. Franziska Schanzkowska was the true identity of the woman. She was a Polish factory worker who had spent time in mental institutions.

In 1952, Marcelle Maurette wrote a play titled Anastasia based on the idea of her survival. An English-language play was translated by Guy Bolton and was staged at the Theatre Royal, Windsor in 1953. A year later, a televised version was produced for BBC. It was staged on Broadway in 1955 and was toured through the United States. Warner Bros. and Metro-Goldwyn-Mayer (MGM) negotiated for the screen rights to the play, but Twentieth Century-Fox obtained the rights for £20,000 (equivalent to US$925–930,000 in 2026). Their filmed version, also titled Anastasia (1956), starred Ingrid Bergman, Yul Brynner, and Helen Hayes.

== Production ==
=== Development ===
In May 1994, Don Bluth and Gary Goldman had signed a long-term deal to produce animated features with 20th Century Fox, with the studio channeling more than $100 million in constructing a new animation studio. They selected Phoenix, Arizona, for the location of Fox Animation Studios because the state offered the company about $1 million in job training funds and low-interest loans for the state-of-the-art digital animation equipment. It was staffed with 300 artists and technicians, a third of whom worked with Bluth and Goldman in Dublin, Ireland, for Sullivan Bluth Studios.

For their first project, 20th Century Fox insisted they select one out of a dozen existing properties which they owned where Bluth and Goldman suggested adapting The King and I and My Fair Lady, though Bluth and Goldman said it would be impossible to improve on Audrey Hepburn's performance and Lerner and Loewe's score. Following several story suggestions, the idea to adapt Anastasia (1956) originated from Fox Filmed Entertainment CEO Bill Mechanic. They later adapted story elements from Pygmalion with the peasant Anya being molded into a regal woman.

Early into production, Bluth and Goldman began researching the actual events through enlisting former CIA agents stationed in Moscow and St. Petersburg. Around this same time, screenwriter Eric Tuchman had written a script. Eventually, Bluth and Goldman decided the history of Anastasia and the Romanov dynasty was too dark for their film. In 1995, Bruce Graham and Susan Gauthier reworked Tuchman's script into a light-hearted romantic comedy. When Graham and Gauthier moved onto other projects, the husband-and-wife screenwriting team Bob Tzudiker and Noni White were hired for additional rewrites. Actress Carrie Fisher also made uncredited rewrites of the film, particularly the scene in which Anya leaves the orphanage for Paris.

For the villain, Bluth and Goldman did not consider depicting Vladimir Lenin and the Bolsheviks. Instead, they toyed with the idea of a vengeful police chief with a vendetta against Anastasia (an idea which the musical adaptation revived as the character Gleb Vaganov). Instead, they incorporated the real-life Russian mystic Grigori Rasputin, who had gained considerable influence with the Romanovs as the villain. Goldman explained they chose Rasputin because of "all the different things they did to try to destroy Rasputin and what a horrible man he really was, the more it seemed appetizing to make him the villain". In reality, Rasputin had been dead for years when the Romanovs were assassinated. In addition to this, Bluth created the idea for Bartok, the albino bat, as a sidekick for Rasputin: "I just thought the villain had to have a comic sidekick, just to let everyone know that it was all right to laugh. A bat seemed a natural friend for Rasputin. Making him a white bat came later – just to make him different".

Composers Stephen Flaherty and Lynn Ahrens recalled being at the Au Bon Pain in New York City where Rasputin and Bartok were pitched. They were dismayed at the decision to go down a historically inaccurate route; they made their stage musical adaptation "more sophisticated, more far-reaching, more political" to encompass their original vision.

=== Casting ===
Don Bluth stated that Meg Ryan was his first and only choice for the title character, but Ryan was indecisive about accepting the role due to its dark historical events. To persuade her, the animation team took an audio clip of Annie Reed from Sleepless in Seattle (1993) and created an animation reel based on it which was screened for her following an invitation to the studio. Ryan later accepted the role; in her words "I was blown away that they did that". Before Ryan was cast, Broadway singer and actress Liz Callaway was brought in to record several demos of the songs hoping to land a job in background vocals, but the demos were liked well enough by the songwriters that they were ultimately used in the final film.

After he was cast, John Cusack openly admitted that he couldn't sing; his singing duties were performed by Jonathan Dokuchitz. Goldman had commented that originally, as with the rest of the cast, they were going to have Ryan record her lines separately from the others, with Bluth reading the lines of the other characters to her. However, after Ryan and the directors were finding the method to be too challenging when her character was paired with Dimitri, she and Cusack recorded the dialogue of their characters together, with Goldman noting that "it made a huge difference".

Peter O'Toole, Patrick Stewart, Jonathan Pryce and Tim Curry were considered for the role of Rasputin, but Christopher Lloyd was hired because of his popularity from the Back to the Future trilogy. Bartok was initially written for Woody Allen, but the studio was reluctant to hire him following revelations of his relationship with his ex-partner Mia Farrow's adoptive daughter, Soon-Yi Previn. Martin Short was also considered, but Hank Azaria won the role ten minutes into his audition.

=== Musical score and soundtrack album ===
The film score was composed, co-orchestrated, and conducted by David Newman, whose father, Alfred Newman, composed the score of the 1956 film of the same name. The songs, of which "Journey to the Past" was nominated for the Academy Award for Best Original Song, were written by Lynn Ahrens and Stephen Flaherty. The first song they wrote for the project was "Once Upon a December"; it was written during a heatwave "so [they were] sweating and writing winter imagery". The film's soundtrack was released in CD and audio cassette format on October 28, 1997.

== Release ==
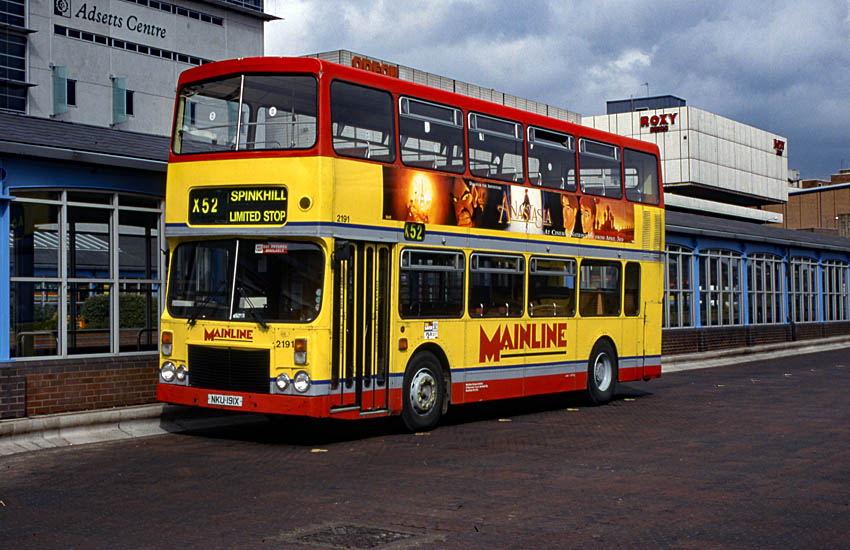
A bus advertised the film in England.

20th Century Fox scheduled for Anastasia to be released on November 21, 1997, notably a week after the re-release of Disney's The Little Mermaid (1989). Disney claimed it had long-planned for the re-release to coincide with consumer products campaign leading into Christmas and the film's home video release in March 1998, as well continue the tradition of re-releasing their animated films within a seven-to-eight year interval. In addition to this, Disney would release several competing family films including Flubber on the following weekend, as well as a double feature of George of the Jungle and Hercules (1997). To avoid branding confusion, Disney banned television advertisements for Anastasia from being aired on the ABC program The Wonderful World of Disney.

Commenting on the studios' fierce competition, Disney spokesman John Dreyer brushed off allegations of studio rivalry, claiming: "We always re-release our movies around holiday periods". However, Bill Mechanic refused to believe Dreyer's statement, in which he responded "it's a deliberate attempt to be a bully, to kick sand in our face. They can't be trying to maximize their own business; the amount they're spending on advertising is ridiculous... It's a concentrated effort to keep our film from fulfilling its potential".

Nonetheless, since its release Anastasia has been confused to have been made by Walt Disney Animation Studios due to the film's similar style to its productions, and in 2019, 20th Century Fox, the film's rights owner, was purchased by the Walt Disney Company.

=== Marketing ===
Fox positioned Anastasia in the competitive Thanksgiving holiday period, a release window that had frequently been dominated by Disney family films. Contemporary coverage described the release as part of Fox's effort to establish itself as a major competitor in feature animation.

Anastasia was accompanied by a marketing campaign of more than $50 million with promotional sponsors from Burger King, Dole Food Company, Hershey, Chesebrough-Ponds, Macy's Thanksgiving Day Parade, Shell Oil, and the 1997 U.S. Figure Skating Championships. Overall, the marketing costs exceeded that of Independence Day by more than 35 percent. For merchandising, Fox selected Galoob to license dolls based on Anastasia. Many storybooks adapted from the film were released by Little Golden Books. In August 1997, the SeaWorld theme parks in San Diego and Orlando featured a 40-foot-long, 20-foot-high inflatable playground for children called "Anastasia's Kingdom".

After the acquisition of 21st Century Fox by Disney, in December 2022, Disney released its first merchandise based on the film in the form of a mug to honor its 25th anniversary.

=== Home media ===
On April 28, 1998, April 6, 1999, and November 16, 1999, Anastasia was released on VHS, LaserDisc and DVD respectively and sold eight million units. The film was first rereleased on February 19, 2002, as part of the Fox Family Features lineup alongside Thumbelina and FernGully: The Last Rainforest. The film was again rereleased on a two-disc "Family Fun Edition" DVD with the film in its original theatrical 2.35:1 widescreen format on March 28, 2006. The first disc featured an optional audio commentary from directors/writers Bluth and Goldman, and additional bonus material. The second included a making-of documentary, music video and making-of featurette of Aaliyah's "Journey to the Past", and additional bonus content. The film was released on Blu-ray on March 22, 2011; this included Bartok the Magnificent in the special features.

==== Streaming ====
Following Disney's acquisition of 20th Century Fox on March 20, 2019, Anastasia became available on Disney+. In the U.S., it was removed from Disney+ on March 1, 2022, and transferred to Starz on March 18; Disney clarified that the film's disappearance bears no connection to the 2022 Russian invasion of Ukraine (Disney had suspended theatrical releases in Russia such as the then-upcoming Turning Red, which led to confusion that Anastasia's withdrawal was related). Anastasia eventually returned to Disney+ on June 2, 2023.

== Reception and legacy ==
Anastasia received mostly positive reviews from critics. Review aggregator website Rotten Tomatoes gives the film a score of 83% based on 58 reviews and an average rating of 7.1/10. The website's consensus reads: "Beautiful animation, an affable take on Russian history, and strong voice performances make Anastasia a winning first film from Fox Animation Studios". On Metacritic, the film has a score of 61 out of 100 based on 19 reviews, indicating "generally favorable" reviews. Audiences polled by CinemaScore gave the film an average grade of "A−" on an A+ to F scale.

Roger Ebert of the Chicago Sun-Times awarded the film three-and-a-half out of four stars, praising "the quality of the story" and writing the result as entertaining and sometimes exciting. Gene Siskel of the Chicago Tribune gave Anastasia three stars, calling the lead character "pretty and charming" but criticized the film for a lack of historical accuracy. Kenneth Turan of the Los Angeles Times wrote: "Though originality is not one of its accomplishments, Anastasia is generally pleasant, serviceable and eager to please. And any film that echoes the landscape of Doctor Zhivago is hard to dislike for too long". Todd McCarthy of Variety noted the film was "dazzlingly colorful", but that "all the ingredients thrown into the pot don't congeal entirely congenially, and the artistic touch applied doesn't allow the whole to become more than the sum of its various, but invariably familiar, elements". Margaret McGurk, reviewing for The Cincinnati Enquirer, described the film as "charming" and "entertaining", and calling Anastasia a tasty tale about a fairy-tale princess. Lisa Osbourne of Boxoffice called the film "pure family entertainment". Awarding the film three out of five stars, Empire's Philip Thomas wrote that it has historical inaccuracies, but is charming.

Several critics have positively compared Anastasia and the Disney films released during the Disney Renaissance, with similar styles of story and animation. Marjorie Baumgarten of The Austin Chronicle awarded the film three out of five stars. Baumgarten wrote that Anastasia "may not beat Disney at its own game, but it sure won't be for lack of trying. ... [t]his sumptuous-looking film clearly spared no expense in its visual rendering; its optical flourishes and attention to detail aim for the Disney gold standard and, for the most part, come pretty darn close". The Phoenix's Jeffrey Gantz jokingly stated: "[I]f imitation is indeed the sincerest form of flattery, then the folks at Disney should feel royally complimented by Twentieth Century Fox's new animated feature about Tsar Nicholas II's youngest daughter". Owen Gleiberman of Entertainment Weekly wrote that Fox has a beautifully animated musical that can challenge Disney's peer, but also said that Anastasia has inferior animation style compared to Disney's and lacks its magic.

=== Russian critical response ===
Critical reception in Russia was also mostly positive aside from artistic liberties with Russian history. Gemini Films, the Russian distributor of Anastasia, stressed the fact that the story was "not history", but rather "a fairy-tale set against the background of real Russian events" in the film's Russian marketing campaign so that its Russian audience would not view it as a historical film. As a result, many Russians praised the film for its art and storytelling and saw it as not a piece of history but another Western import to be enjoyed.

Some Russian Orthodox Christians found Anastasia to be an offensive depiction of the Grand Duchess, who was canonized as a new martyr in 1981 by the Russian Orthodox Church Outside Russia. Many historians echoed their sentiments, criticizing the film as a sanitized, sugar-coated reworking of the story of the Tsar's youngest daughter. Its filmmakers acknowledged the fact that "Anastasia uses history only as a starting point", but others complained that the film would provide its audience with misleading ideas about Russian history, which, according to the author and historian Suzanne Massie, has been falsified for so many years. Similarly, the amateur historian Bob Atchison said that Anastasia was akin to someone making a film in which Anne Frank "moves to Orlando and opens a crocodile farm with a guy named Mort".

Some of Anastasia's contemporary relatives also said that the film was distasteful, but most Romanovs have come to accept the "repeated exploitation of Anastasia's romantic tale... with equanimity".

=== Box office ===
A limited release of Anastasia at the Ziegfeld Theatre in New York City on the weekend of November 14, 1997, grossed $120,541. The following weekend, the wide release of Anastasia in the United States earned $14.1 million, ranking second behind Mortal Kombat Annihilation. By the end of its theatrical run, Anastasia had grossed $58.4 million in the United States and Canada and $81.4 million internationally. The worldwide gross totaled up to about $139.8 million, making it Don Bluth's highest-grossing film to date and beating out his next highest-grossing film, An American Tail, by about $55 million. This was Don Bluth's first financially successful film since All Dogs Go to Heaven.

=== Accolades ===
The film was nominated for two Academy Awards, for Best Original Musical or Comedy Score and Best Original Song (for "Journey to the Past"). The R&B singer Aaliyah performed the pop version at the ceremony.

List of awards and nominations
Award	Category	Nominee(s)	Result	Ref.
Academy Awards	Best Original Musical or Comedy Score	Music by Stephen Flaherty; Lyrics by Lynn Ahrens; Orchestral Score by David Newman	Nominated	
Academy Awards	Best Original Song	"Journey to the Past"; Music by Stephen Flaherty; Lyrics by Lynn Ahrens	Nominated	
Annie Awards	Outstanding Achievement in an Animated Theatrical Feature		Nominated	
Annie Awards	Outstanding Individual Achievement for Directing in an Animated Feature Production	Don Bluth and Gary Goldman	Nominated	
Annie Awards	Outstanding Individual Achievement for Producing in an Animated Feature Production	Don Bluth and Gary Goldman	Nominated	
Annie Awards	Outstanding Individual Achievement for Writing in an Animated Feature Production	Animation Adaptation by Eric Tuchman; Screenplay by Susan Gauthier, Bruce Graham, Bob Tzudiker, and Noni White	Nominated	
Annie Awards	Outstanding Individual Achievement for Effects Animation	Peter Matheson	Nominated	
Annie Awards	Outstanding Individual Achievement for Music in an Animated Feature Production	Songs by Stephen Flaherty and Lynn Ahrens; Score by David Newman	Nominated	
Annie Awards	Outstanding Individual Achievement for Voice Acting by a Male Performer in an Animated Feature Production	Hank Azaria	Won	
Annie Awards	Outstanding Individual Achievement for Voice Acting by a Female Performer in an Animated Feature Production	Angela Lansbury	Nominated	
Annie Awards	Outstanding Individual Achievement for Voice Acting by a Female Performer in an Animated Feature Production	Meg Ryan	Nominated	
Artios Awards	Best Casting for Animated Voice-Over	Brian Chavanne	Won	
ASCAP Film and Television Music Awards	Most Performed Songs from Motion Pictures	"At the Beginning"; Music by Stephen Flaherty; Lyrics by Lynn Ahrens	Won	
Awards Circuit Community Awards	Best Animated Feature		Nominated	
Blockbuster Entertainment Awards	Favorite Animated Family Movie		Nominated	
Critics' Choice Awards	Best Family Film		Won	
Dallas–Fort Worth Film Critics Association Awards	Best Animated Film		Won	
Golden Globe Awards	Best Original Song – Motion Picture	"Journey to the Past"; Music by Stephen Flaherty; Lyrics by Lynn Ahrens	Nominated	
Golden Globe Awards	Best Original Song – Motion Picture	"Once Upon a December"; Music by Stephen Flaherty; Lyrics by Lynn Ahrens	Nominated	
Golden Reel Awards	Best Sound Editing – Animated Feature		Nominated	
Golden Reel Awards	Best Sound Editing – Music Animation	Brent Brooks and Tom Villano	Won	
Kansas City Film Critics Circle Awards	Best Animated Film		Won	
Online Film & Television Association Awards	Best Animated Picture	Don Bluth and Gary Goldman	Won	
Online Film & Television Association Awards	Best Comedy/Musical Score	Stephen Flaherty, Lynn Ahrens, and David Newman	Nominated	
Online Film & Television Association Awards	Best Original Song	"Once Upon a December"; Music by Stephen Flaherty; Lyrics by Lynn Ahrens	Nominated	
Online Film & Television Association Awards	Best Voice-Over Performance	Hank Azaria	Nominated	
Online Film & Television Association Awards	Best Voice-Over Performance	Angela Lansbury	Nominated	
Online Film & Television Association Awards	Best Voice-Over Performance	Meg Ryan	Nominated	
Satellite Awards	Best Motion Picture – Animated or Mixed Media Film		Nominated	
Satellite Awards	Best Original Score	David Newman	Nominated	
Satellite Awards	Best Original Song	"Journey to the Past"; Music by Stephen Flaherty; Lyrics by Lynn Ahrens	Nominated	
Satellite Awards	Best Original Song	"Once Upon a December"; Music by Stephen Flaherty; Lyrics by Lynn Ahrens	Nominated	
Young Artist Awards	Best Family Feature Film – Animation		Won	

=== Adaptations and other media ===
==== Ice Follies ====
Anastasia on Ice is a licensed adaptation produced by Feld Entertainment's Ice Follies that ran from at least 1998 to 1999.

==== Video game ====
In 1997, a puzzle video game adaptation titled Anastasia: Adventures with Pooka and Bartok was released, developed by Motion Works, published by Fox Interactive, and distributed by 20th Century Fox Home Entertainment.

==== Spin-off film ====
In 1999, a direct-to-video standalone spin-off titled Bartok the Magnificent was released which focuses on the character of Bartok.

==== Stage musical adaptation ====
Hartford Stage developed a stage production of Anastasia, with the book by Terrence McNally, lyrics by Lynn Ahrens, music by Stephen Flaherty and directed by Darko Tresnjak. The production ran from May 13 through June 19, 2016.

It is an original musical adaptation of the 1997 animated film whilst incorporating some elements from the 1956 Arthur Laurents film. The musical features six songs from the animated film and 16 new songs. Additionally, there have been some newly rewritten characters including Checkist secret police officer Gleb Vaganov (in the place of Rasputin), and Lily, who has been renamed in the place of Sophie. McNally said: "This is a stage version for a modern theatre audience... The libretto's 'a blend' of old and new... There are characters in the musical that appear in neither the cartoon nor the Ingrid Bergman version".

The Hartford production featured Christy Altomare as Anastasia / Anya, Derek Klena as Dimitri, Mary Beth Peil as The Dowager Empress Maria Feodorovna, Manoel Felciano as Gleb Vaganov, John Bolton as Vladimir, Caroline O'Connor as Lily, and Nicole Scimeca as Young Anastasia. The musical transferred to Broadway with much of the original Hartford cast, opening on April 24, 2017, at the Broadhurst Theater to mixed reviews.

== See also ==
- Anna Anderson
- Koschei
- List of 20th Century Studios theatrical animated feature films
- Romanov impostors
