= Liz Callaway =

American actress and singer (born 1961)

- Callaway at Dragon Con in 2026
- Born: April 13, 1961 (age 65); Chicago, Illinois, U.S.
- Occupations: Actress; singer; recording artist
- Years active: 1979–present
- Spouse: Dan Foster (m. 1985)
- Children: 1
- Musical career
- Genres: Musical theater; pop; vocal
- Instruments: Vocals
- Label: Varèse Sarabande
- Website: lizcallaway.com

Signature
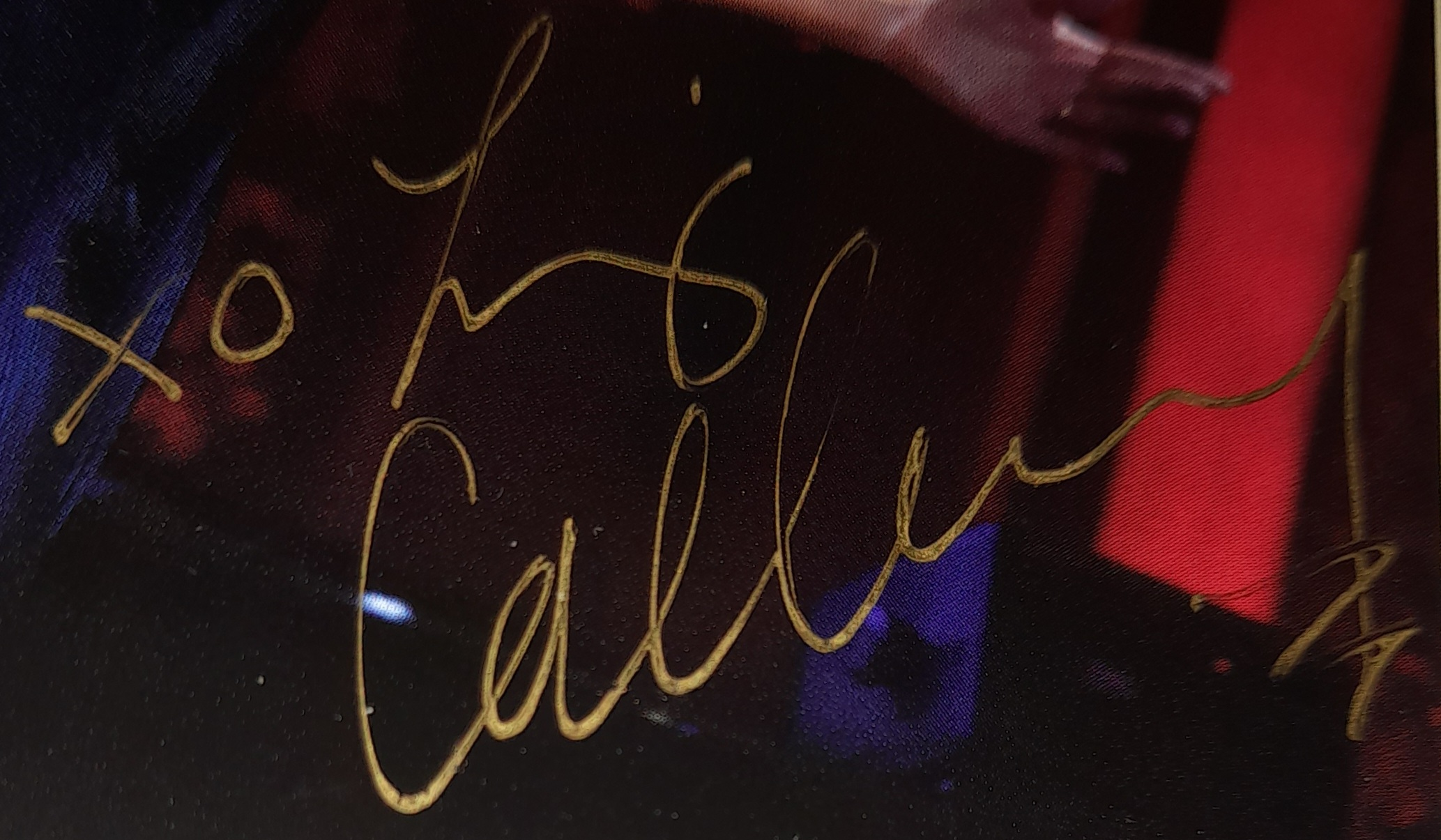

Liz Callaway (born April 13, 1961) is an American actress and singer, who is best known for having provided the singing voices of many female characters in animated films, such as Anastasia in Anastasia, Odette in The Swan Princess, Jasmine in the Aladdin sequels The Return of Jafar and Aladdin and the King of Thieves, adult Kiara in The Lion King II: Simba's Pride, a dancing napkin ring in Beauty and the Beast, and the Speaker of God in Hazbin Hotel. She was also the original Ellen in the Broadway production of Miss Saigon.

== Early life, family, and education ==
Callaway was born in Chicago, Illinois to Shirley Callaway, a singer, pianist, and vocal coach, and John Callaway, a journalist. Her sister is actress, composer, and singer Ann Hampton Callaway, with whom she sang the theme song for the Fran Drescher comedy series The Nanny, which Ann Hampton Callaway also composed. Both sisters attended New Trier High School (New Trier East) in Winnetka, Illinois. Callaway has also appeared in a number of cabaret and stage productions with her sister. Recordings of two of them, Sibling Revelry recorded live at Rainbow and Stars in 1995 and Boom! recorded live at Birdland in 2011, have been released.

== Career ==
Liz Callaway made her Broadway debut in Stephen Sondheim's short-lived Merrily We Roll Along (1981). This began a long-term professional relationship with Sondheim: Callaway has performed in a number of live concerts in his honor, appeared with Sondheim on Inside the Actors Studio, and also played the role of Young Sally in the Lincoln Center concert production of Follies with Mandy Patinkin, Barbara Cook, George Hearn, Lee Remick, Carol Burnett, Elaine Stritch, and the New York Philharmonic. Follies was recorded live and also filmed as a documentary.

Additional stage credits include Lizzie in Baby (for which she earned a Tony Award nomination), The Three Musketeers, The Spitfire Grill (for which she earned a Drama Desk Award nomination), Sunday in the Park with George, Evita, and Miss Saigon. Liz also performed in The Look of Love, a 2003 musical revue of the songs of Burt Bacharach and Hal David. As a replacement on Broadway, Callaway played the role of Grizabella for five years in Cats. Callaway also had her own children's television show on WNEV-TV in Boston, Ready to Go, which ran from 1987 to 1991, winning her an Emmy Award. She left this series to begin rehearsals for Miss Saigon on Broadway.

In July 2012, she starred as Norma Desmond in the Pittsburgh CLO's new production of Sunset Boulevard

Callaway has also provided the singing voices for a number of animated characters, including Anya/Anastasia in Anastasia, Kiara in The Lion King II: Simba's Pride, Princess Jasmine in The Return of Jafar and Aladdin and the King of Thieves, and Princess Odette in The Swan Princess.

She has performed various cabaret acts at Joe's Pub, Rainbow and Stars, the Russian Tea Room, 54 Below, and Lincoln Center in New York City, and at the Donmar Warehouse in London, among other venues.

Callaway's solo recordings include Anywhere I Wander (1993), The Story Goes On (1995), and The Beat Goes On (2001). She released her fourth recording, Passage of Time, for the record label PS Classics, on October 20, 2009, which featured an appearance with her sister Ann Hampton Callaway. In 2015 she released an album of songs from her most recognized work, The Essential Liz Callaway. In 2022 To Steve with Love: Liz Callaway Celebrates Sondheim was released, a live performance from 54 Below. Callaway has also released two Christmas recordings.

Liz was honored at the 25th Annual Bistro Awards in New York City.

== Personal life ==
In 1985, Callaway married theatre director and producer Dan Foster, a founding producer of the Hudson Stage Company, a nonprofit, professional theatre company in residence at Pace University in Westchester County, New York. They have a son.

== Filmography ==
=== Film ===
Year	Title	Role	Notes
1991	Beauty and the Beast	Additional voices	
1994	The Return of Jafar	Princess Jasmine (singing voice)	Direct-to-video
1994	The Swan Princess	Princess Odette (singing voice)	
1995	Pocahontas	Chorus (voice)	
1996	Aladdin and the King of Thieves	Princess Jasmine (singing voice)	Direct-to-video
1997	Anastasia	Anastasia (singing voice)	
1997	The Brave Little Toaster to the Rescue	Singer (voice)	Direct-to-video
1998	The Brave Little Toaster Goes to Mars	Singer (voice)	Direct-to-video
1998	The Lion King II: Simba's Pride	Adult Kiara (singing voice)	Direct-to-video
1998	The Swan Princess: Sing Along	Princess Odette (singing voice)	Direct-to-video
1999	Bartok the Magnificent	Ensemble cast (voice)	
2002	The Princess and the Pea	Princess Sara (singing voice)	
2012	Didi Lightful	Mrs. Lightful (voice)	Short
2013	Despicable Me	Various (voice)	Uncredited
2014	The Rewrite	Mrs. Lerner	

=== Television ===
Year	Title	Role	Notes
1981	Senior Trip	Judy Matheson	Television film
1987	Lyle, Lyle Crocodile: The Musical – The House on East 88th Street	Mrs. Primm (singing voice)	Television film
1993	The Nanny	Performer on the opening theme	Performed with Ann Hampton Callaway
2016	The Mentors	Mentor	Episode: "Liz Callaway & Lauren Ashley Carter"
2025	Hazbin Hotel	The Speaker of God (speaking & singing voice)	Episode: "Storyteller"

=== Stage ===
Year	Title	Role	Notes
1981	Merrily We Roll Along	Nightclub Waitress	Alvin Theatre, Broadway
1982	Cats	Grizabella (Replacement)	Winter Garden Theatre, Broadway
1983	Baby	Lizzie Fields	Ethel Barrymore Theatre, Broadway
1984	The Three Musketeers	Lady Constance Bonacieux	Broadway Theatre, Broadway
1986	Brownstone	Claudia	Roundabout Theatre Company, Off-Broadway
1986	Evita	Eva Peron	Providence College
1987	Marry Me A Little	Woman	York Theatre, Off-Broadway
1987	No Way To Treat A Lady	Performer	Hudson Guild Theater, Off-Broadway
1987	Sunday in the Park with George	Dot	Providence College
1991	Miss Saigon	Ellen	Broadway Theatre, Broadway
1994	Fiorello!	Dora	New York City Center, Off-Broadway
2001	The Spitfire Grill	Shelby Thorpe	The Duke on 42nd Street, Off-Broadway
2003	The Look of Love	Performer	Brooks Atkinson Theatre, Broadway
2012	Sunset Boulevard	Norma Desmond	Pittsburgh CLO

== Discography ==
- Anywhere I Wander (Varèse Sarabande) (September 28, 1993)
- Magical Selections from the Original Motion Picture Soundtrack of Disney's Aladdin (Walt Disney Records, 1995) - performer on "Forget About Love" (duet with Gilbert Gottfried) & "Out of Thin Air" (duet with Brad Kane)
- Sibling Revelry (DRG, 1996) with Ann Hampton Callaway
- The Story Goes On (Varèse Sarabande) (August 29, 1995)
- The Beat Goes On (Varèse Sarabande) (May 15, 2001)
- Passage of Time (PS Classics) (October 20, 2009)
- Boom! Live at Birdland (PS Classics, 2011) with Ann Hampton Callaway
- The Essential Liz Callaway (2015)
- Merry and Bright (2013)
- Comfort and Joy (An Acoustic Christmas) (Working Girl Records) with Peter Calo (December 4, 2020)
- To Steve with Love: Liz Callaway Celebrates Sondheim (Working Girl Records) (November 11, 2022)
- Hazbin Hotel: Season Two (Original Soundtrack) (2025) - performer on "Sera's Confession" (duet with Patina Miller)
- The Wizard And I: Liz Callaway sings Stephen Schwartz (Working Girl Records) (Recorded Live at 54 Below on September 3-4, 2025 and released January 2026)
