= List of French art works in the National Museum of Serbia =

The Regent and the countess de Parabère, by Robert Tournières, (canvas 96x130cm)

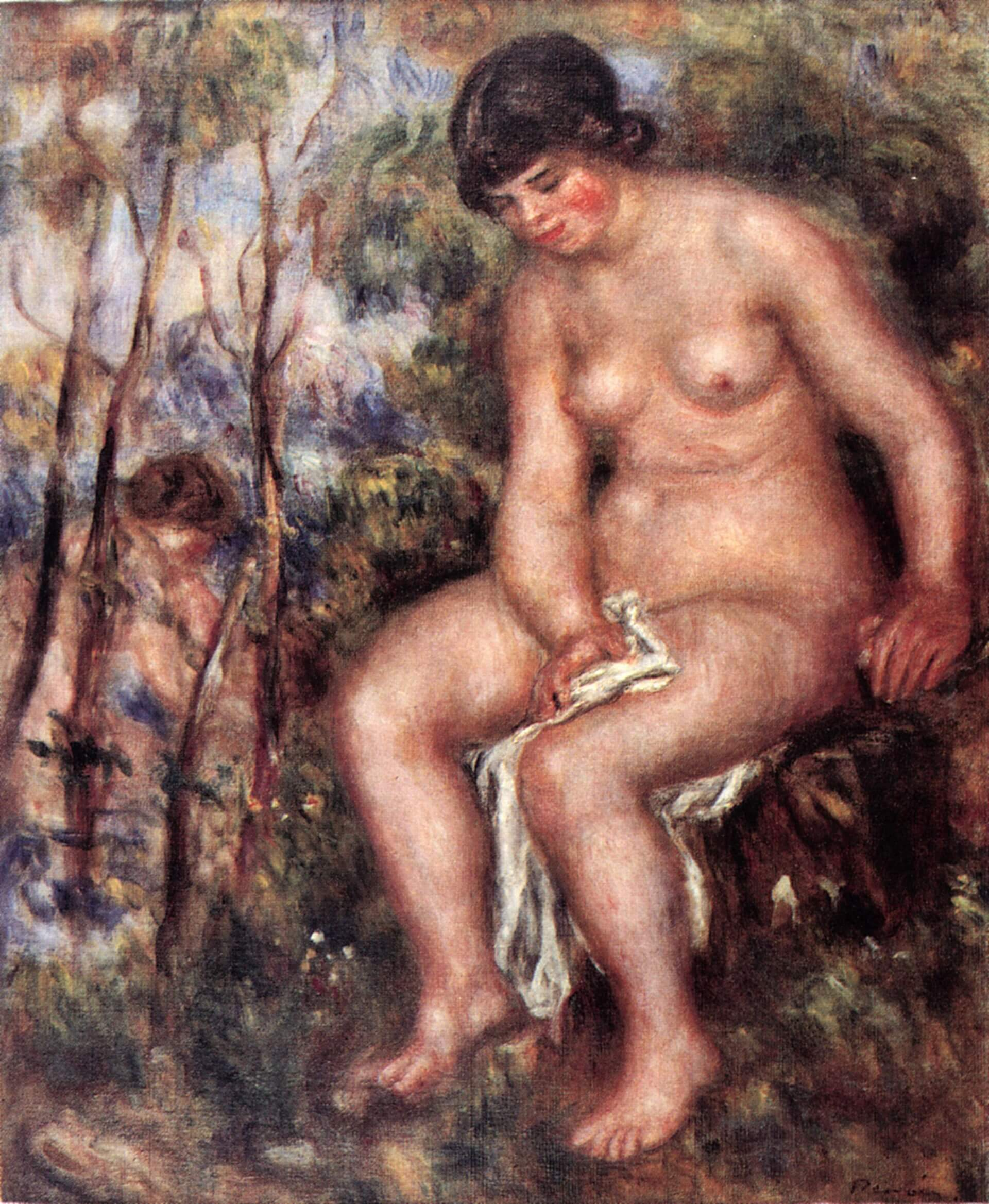
Renoir's Nude.

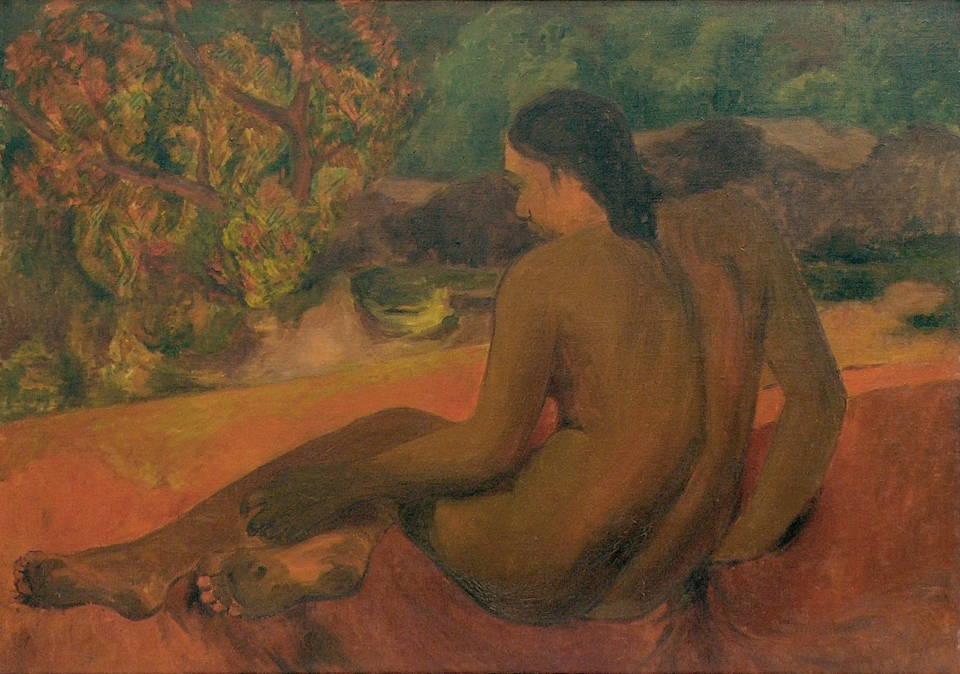
'Tahitian Girl', by Gauguin

'Place du Theatre Francais: Sun effect', by Camille Pissarro 1898

Rouen Cathedral (Monet), red sunlight, 1892.

Landscape with figures at Cagnes, by Renoir

The French Art Collection in National Museum of Serbia consists of more than 250 paintings and more than 400 graphics and drawings, from the 16th to early 20th century, including the Šlomović Collection (58 paintings and over 200 graphics). Among the French painters represented in the collection are Robert Tournières, Hubert Robert, Sébastien Bourdon, Eugène Delacroix, Gauguin, Renoir, Henri de Toulouse-Lautrec, Matisse, Monet, Cézanne, Degas, Jean-Baptiste-Camille Corot, Mary Cassatt, Paul Signac, Maurice Utrillo, Auguste Rodin, Georges Rouault, Pierre Bonnard, Pissarro, Odilon Redon, Gustave Moreau, Honoré Daumier, Eugène Carrière, Maurice de Vlaminck, André Derain, Raoul Dufy, Suzanne Valadon, Eugène Fromentin, Émile Bernard, Forain, André Dunoyer de Segonzac, Robert Delaunay, Pascin, Rosa Bonheur, Marie Laurencin, Georges Dufrénoy. The graphic and etching collection includes work by Charles Le Brun, Sébastien Bourdon, Jacques Callot, Charles-François Daubigny, Degas, Delacroix, Jean-Baptiste-Camille Corot, Le Corbusier (3 graphic), Renoir, Jean Cocteau, Eugène Carrière, etc. .

Some of the works are:

- Nicolas Tournier, Concert (canvas 120x169cm) (Before attributed to Caravaggio)
- Robert Tournières, Regent and Ms De Parabere (canvas 96x130cm)
- Jean-Marc Nattier, Portrait of Lady with Flower (canvas 73x59cm)
- Hubert Robert, (2 works) Stairway of Farnese Palace Park and Park on the Lake
- Felix Nadar, Milos Obrenovic Portrait (canvas 116x90cm 1874)
- Cézanne,(5 works) Breakfast in the field (4 works)-(lithograph) Bathers (watercolor),
- Renoir, (18 paintings, 5 pastels, 25 drawings, 28 prints) canvases: Nude, Sea by Trelaulle, Female Laying Act, Girl with umbrella, Landscape with post office at Cagnes, Small boy, Two girls, Woman with hat, Recumbent Nude, Guitar Players (drawings), Two Women with Umbrellas (1879, Pastel on paper), Bathers (drawing), At the Moulin de la Galette (pencil) and others
- Monet, Rouen Cathedral
- Henri de Toulouse-Lautrec, (3 works) Female portrait (canvas), Yvette Gilber Portrait (chalk drawing), Female Singer (lithograph)
- Degas (40 works), Three Ballerinas in blue, Courtesans, Ballerinas (drawing), Women at her Toilet (drawing), Monotype, The bath, Bust of man in soft hat, Study of a Dancer in Tights (1900, black crayon) and others
- Gauguin, (5 works) Tahitian girl (oil on canvas - 143 x 98 cm), Tahitian Girl with Dog (watercolor), Still Life with Liqueur bottle Benedikt (oil on canvas), Joys of Brittany (1889, tempera), Tahitian Man with the Craft (watercolour)
- Pissarro, (2 canvases, 2 watercolours, 6 graphics) Place du Theatre Francais-Sun effect (canvas), Green Landscape (canvas), Portrait of Paul Gauguin (watercolor), Road through Field (watercolor) and Market at Pontoise (drawing)
- Matisse, (3 works) Red Beech (canvas), Head of a Woman (drawing), Beside the window (canvas)
- Corot (4 canvases, 1 drawing), In the Park (canvas), Landscape from Italy (canvas), Pasture beside the Hillock (canvas),Landscape with the Swamp and Meadow by the Swamp (drawing)
- André Derain, (3 oils, 2 chalks), Sailboats at Carriéres, Landscape with Olive Trees, Still Life, Female Act (chalk), Nude (chalk).
- Honoré Daumier, Mother
- Gustave Moreau, Tired Centaur
- Maurice Utrillo, (5 oils and 1 gouache) Cabare Lapine Agile II, Montmartre, Montmartre under snow (gouache), Parisian Street, Cathedral in Sartre (canvas), Madhouse in Sanoa and Saint-Vensain Street
- Maurice de Vlaminck, (5 works) Fields, The snow, Vase with Flowers, Still Life with Fish (1905) and My Father's Orchard (1905)
- Redon, (11 works) A Head of a Gnome, Profile of a Girl with Flowers, La Chimere (drawing) and Eyes (drawing)
- Paul Signac, (2 works) Woman drinking tea (canvas), St. Malo, Walls and Barges (aquarelle)
- Pierre Bonnard, (3 canvases, 25 graphics and 1 pastel) Reading Lady (canvas), Sitting Child (canvas),City scene on Mon-Matre, Still Life, Place Clichy (pastel)
- Auguste Rodin, (1 watercolor, 2 graphics), Female Act (watercolor),Female Act (pencil) and Two Females Act (pencil)
- Édouard Vuillard, Interior (tempera), Child on Sleeping (pastel)
- Raoul Dufy, (2 gouaches and 29 etchings) St Juan Bay (aquarelle)
- Constant Troyon, Cows and Sheep
- Rosa Bonheur, White Horse in the Stalls
- Othon Friesz, Woman with Jar and Flowers
- Marie Laurencin, Two sisters (canvas) and Ballerinas (lithography)
- Georges Rouault, (1 watercolour, 1 gouache, 52 etchings and graphics) Old man Ibi (gouache and tempera), Clown (aquarelle)
- Léopold Survage, Landscape from Colliure (tempera)
- Charles-François Daubigny, Landscape with Moonshine (canvas)
- Henri Harpignies, Landscape with River (canvas 123x150cm), Omans by Erissone, Landscape (aquarelle)
- Jean Cocteau, Sketch (drawing)
- Eugène Boudin, Still Life with Cherries
- Suzanne Valadon, Flowers, Still Life with Flowers
- Félix Ziem, Venetian Landscape with Sailing Boat
- André Lhote, (1 canvas,3 graphics) Female Portrait c1925,
- Lucien Pissarro, Sunny Landscape (canvas), Rain in Cold Harbour (canvas)
- Forain, (1 pastel, 24 graphics), Satirical Scenes, Ballerina (pastel)
- Jacques-Émile Blanche, Princess Olga of Greece and Denmark Portrait
- Georges Dufrénoy, Still Life with Flowers, Dahlias
- Léon-Victor Dupré, Forest
- Aristide Maillol, (3 sculptures and 3 charcoals) The Bather, The Bather with Veil and Sketch Composition
- Louis Gustave Ricard, Portrait of Man in Black Coat
- Bernard, Pere Ubu
- Robert Delaunay, Runners, Eiffel Tower (ink)
- Pascin, Balcony
- Rodolphe d'Erlanger, Balcony in Flowers
- Léon Augustin Lhermitte, Haystacks
- Paul Dubois, Moroccan Fortune-Teller
- André Dunoyer de Segonzac, Landscape from South (canvas), Nude Woman (ink)
- Charles Fouqueray, Mount Adam in Sri Lanka
- Eugène Isabey, Gothic Ruins
- Georges Scott, Bridge (canvas)
- Eugène Carrière, Mother with her Child (canvas), Landscape with Figure, Landscape with Hill
- Alfred Manessier, Tree (lithograph)
- Maurice Denis, Girl with Basket (charcoal)
- Lucien-Victor Guirand de Scévola, Road to Provence (canvas 147x115cm)
