= Anastasia (1956 film) =

1956 American historical drama film directed by Anatole Litvak

- Theatrical release poster
- Directed by: Anatole Litvak
- Screenplay by: Arthur Laurents
- Based on: Anastasia (1952 play) by Marcelle Maurette
- Produced by: Buddy Adler
- Starring: Ingrid Bergman; Yul Brynner; Helen Hayes
- Cinematography: Jack Hildyard
- Edited by: Bert Bates
- Music by: Alfred Newman
- Production company: 20th Century Fox
- Distributed by: 20th Century Fox
- Release date: December 13, 1956
- Running time: 105 minutes
- Country: United States
- Language: English
- Budget: $3.52 million
- Box office: $4.3 million (US and Canada rentals)

Anastasia is a 1956 American historical romantic drama film directed by Anatole Litvak and starring Ingrid Bergman, Yul Brynner and Helen Hayes. The screenplay written by Arthur Laurents is adapted from a 1952 play by French dramatist Marcelle Maurette, which is in turn inspired by the story of Anna Anderson, the best-known of the many Anastasia impostors who emerged after the Imperial family were murdered in July 1918.

Set in interwar France, the film follows a plot related to rumours that the Grand Duchess Anastasia Nikolaevna of Russia, the youngest daughter of the late Tsar Nicholas II and Empress Alexandra Feodorovna, survived the execution of her family in 1918. Russian General Bounine (Brynner), former leader of the White Army during the Russian Revolution, along with his associates plot to swindle an inheritance of £10 million from the Grand Duchess using an amnesiac (Bergman) who looks remarkably like the missing Anastasia. The exiled émigrés of the Russian aristocracy, in particular the Dowager Empress Marie Feodorovna (Hayes), must be convinced that their handpicked claimant is legitimate if the plotters are to get her money.

The film represented a Hollywood comeback for its star Ingrid Bergman, after several years working exclusively in Europe following her much-publicized affair with Roberto Rossellini. She won the Academy Award for Best Actress, the Golden Globe Award for Best Actress in a Motion Picture – Drama, and the New York Film Critics Circle Award for Best Actress for her performance.

== Plot ==
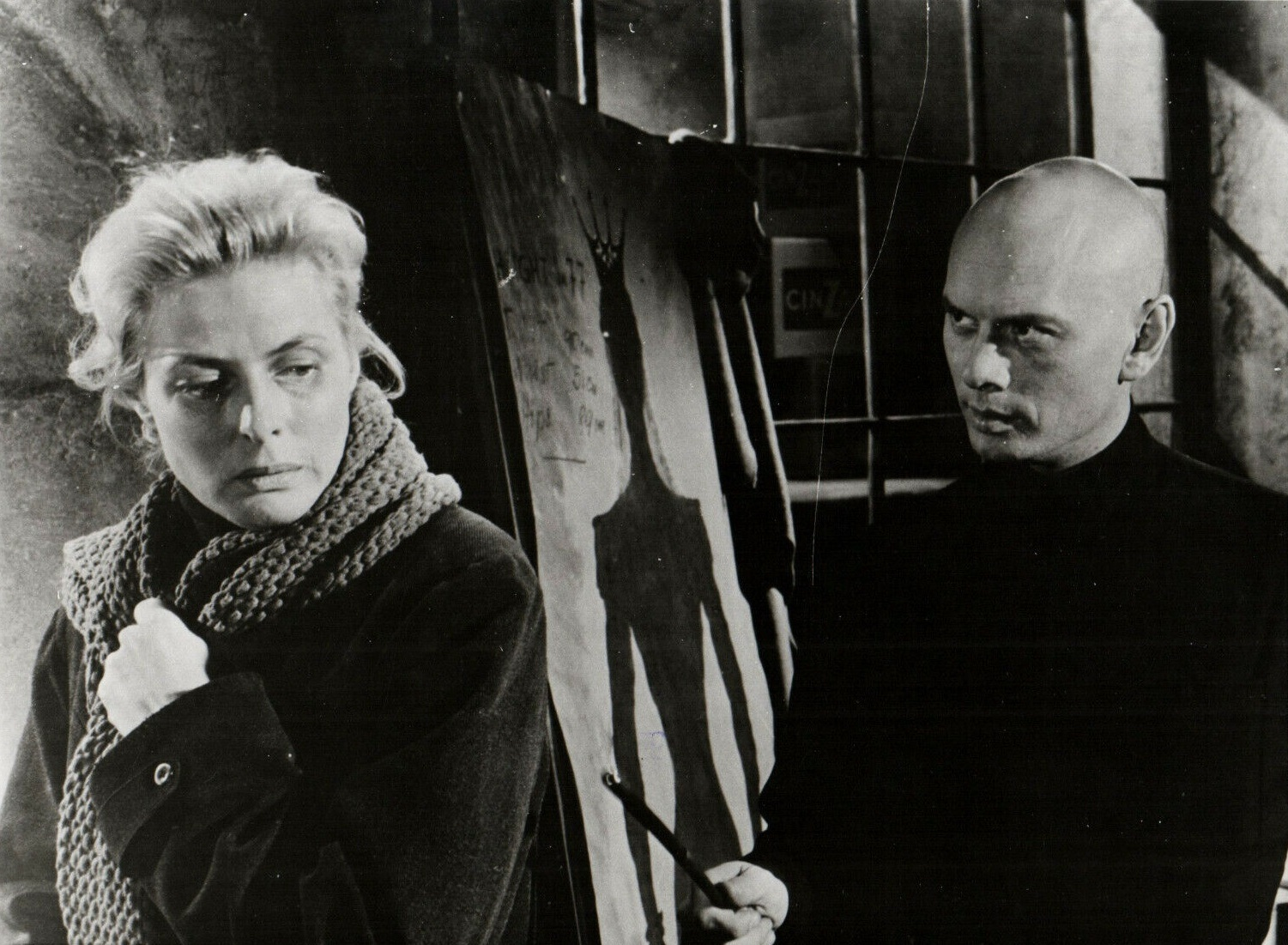
Rescuing a suicidal Anna Anderson, to convince her to join his hoax, Bounine encourages her delusion that she might be Anastasia, daughter of Czar Nicholas II, who survived the assassination of her family.

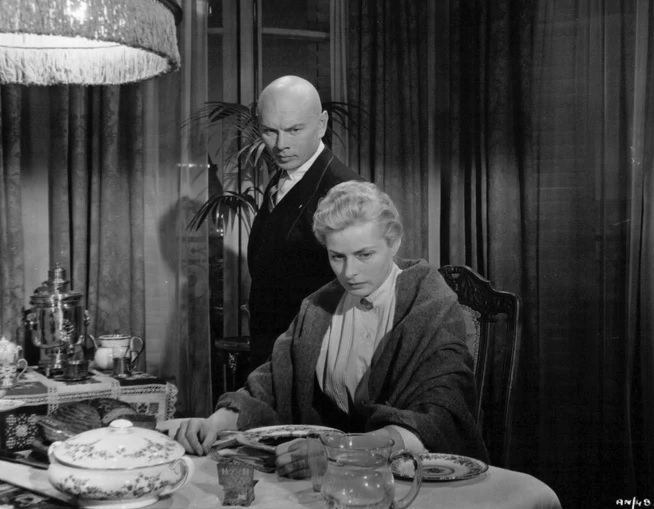
Bounine coaches Anna Anderson in details in the life of Anastasia Romanova.

Though the last Russian Tsar and his family were executed in 1918, rumors persisted that his youngest daughter, the Grand Duchess Anastasia, somehow survived. In 1928 Paris, Anna Koreff, an ailing woman resembling Anastasia, is brought to the attention of former White Russian General Bounine, now the proprietor of a successful Russian-themed nightclub. Bounine knows that while Anna was in a mental asylum being treated for amnesia, she told a nun that she was Anastasia. When approached by Bounine and addressed as the grand duchess, she refuses to have anything to do with him. She flees and tries to throw herself into the River Seine, but is stopped.

Bounine meets with his associates Boris Chernov and Piotr Petrovin. Bounine has already repeatedly raised funds from stockholders (eager to gain a share of £10 million belonging to Czar Nicholas held by a British bank) based on his claim that he had found Anastasia. Privately he admits it is a scam. The stockholders have lost patience and have given him eight days to produce her.

Bounine arranges to coach Anna to pass as Anastasia. During this time, she and Bounine become attracted to one another. Later, in a series of carefully arranged encounters with former familiars and members of the imperial court, Anna begins to display confidence and style that astonish many skeptical interlocutors. While a few accept Anna as Anastasia, no relative with any credibility will endorse her.

With time running out, Bounine takes Anna to Copenhagen to convince the highly skeptical Dowager Empress Maria Feodorovna, Anastasia's grandmother. Meanwhile, Bounine becomes increasingly jealous of the attentions that Prince Paul, another fortune hunter, pays to Anna. The Empress initially refuses to receive Anna; however, after seeing her at a Tchaikovsky ballet, the resemblance to Anastasia piques her curiosity. Unannounced, the Empress visits; at first she declares Anna a well-trained actress, skilled in melodrama. She is unmoved by details generally known to courtiers. When Anna refers to her nickname as "Malenkaya" (Little One) and then begins to cough, declaring that she always coughs when she is frightened, the empress becomes convinced Anna is her granddaughter. Nevertheless, she exclaims, “You have come back, Anastasia!… but, oh please, if it should not be you, don't ever tell me.”

At a press conference presenting Anna as Anastasia, Mikhail Vlados, who met Anna at a hospital in Bucharest in 1920 and then took her home with him, accuses her of being Anna Koreff, a fraud. Anna acknowledges she has used that name, unsure who she was. Vlados accuses her of having sustained head wounds in a train explosion outside Bucharest, not in a Russian assassination attempt. Anna replies she remembers being in a train explosion and that it is possible to have been wounded twice in a revolution.

Bounine expresses disapproval that Anna now wants to marry Prince Paul, have the money and the nobility, whereas originally she just wanted to know who she really was. She points out that a month ago he wanted the same thing. He scornfully tells her to marry Paul, a man who would not go near her if she weren't an heiress.

Before a grand ball in Copenhagen at which Anna/Anastasia's engagement to Paul is to be announced, the Empress has a private conversation with Bounine in which he admits feelings for Anna, which impresses her. Leaving him, the Empress orders him to stay in the Green Room. Receiving Anna, she offers her Catherine the Great's emeralds; Anna refuses, saying she has been given "herself" again, which moves the Empress. Realizing Anna loves Bounine, the Empress sends Anna to the Green Room, staging an encounter between them.

When it is time to announce Anastasia at the ball, an attendant announces that Anastasia cannot be found. The Empress asks whether he has checked the Green Room. When told yes, she then states decisively that Anastasia and Bounine have both gone. Prince Paul then asks, "You mean the others were right, she was not Anastasia after all?" The Empress responds, "Wasn't she?" When Paul asks what she will announce to the courtiers, the Empress responds, "I will say the play is over, go home", as the anthem God Save the Tsar is played.

== Cast ==
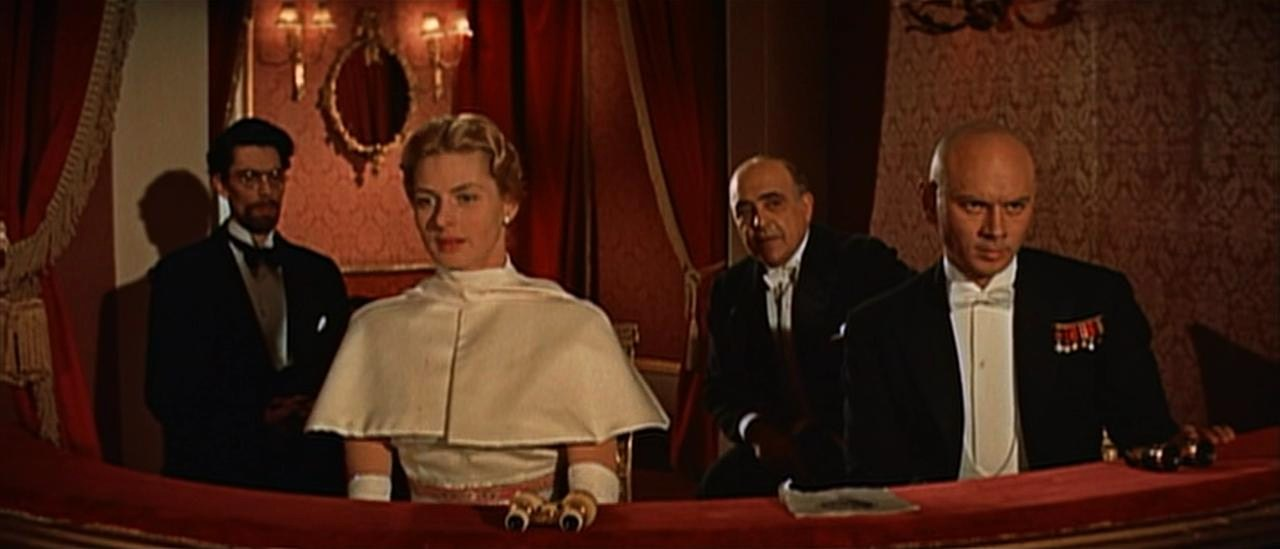
The plotters attend a Tchaikovsky ballet to entice the curiosity of the Dowager Empress Maria Feodorovna, Anastasia's grandmother, to agree to meet Anna Anderson. L-R: Sacha Pitoëff (Petrovin), Ingrid Bergman (Anastasia), Akim Tamiroff (Chernov) and Yul Brynner (Bounine).

Credits from the AFI Catalog of Feature Films:

- Ingrid Bergman as Anastasia, aka Anna Korov and Anna Anderson
- Yul Brynner as General Bounine
- Helen Hayes as the Dowager Empress
- Akim Tamiroff as Chernov
- Martita Hunt as Baroness Elena von Livenbaum
- Felix Aylmer as Russian chamberlain
- Sacha Pitoëff as Petrovin
- Ivan Desny as Prince Paul
- Natalie Schafer as Lissenskaia
- Grégoire Gromoff as Stepan
- Karel Štěpánek as Viados
- Ina De La Haye as Marusia
- Katherine Kath as Maxime

The below do not appear in the opening credits

- Eric Pohlmann as Von Drivnitz
- Olaf Pooley as Zhadanov
- Peter Sallis as Grischa
- Tamara Shayne as Zenia
- Nora Nicholson as Lady-in-Waiting
- George Pravda as Danish Customs Officer

== Background ==
=== Historical basis ===
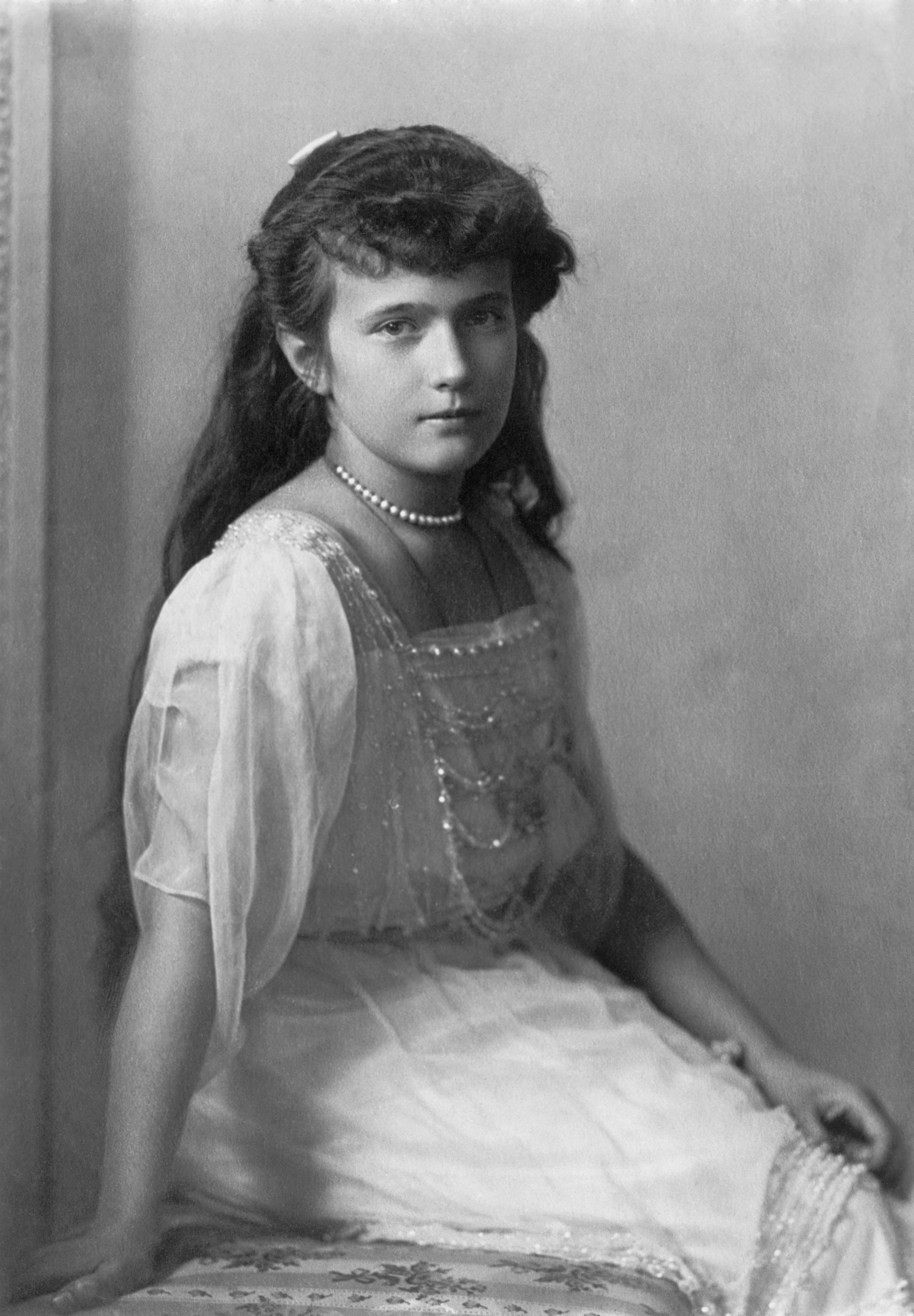
Grand Duchess Anastasia Nikolaevna.

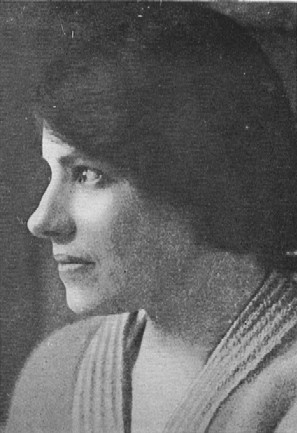
Anna Anderson in 1922.

The play and film are both inspired by the phenomenon of Anastasia impostors, who appeared in the years following the Russian Imperial Romanov family's death in July 1918. Due to the disposal method of the remains and later Soviet government attempts to downplay the killings, claims of surviving Romanov family members percolated for years. The location of Anastasia's remains was not confirmed until 2007.

Anna Anderson (born: Franziska Schanzkowska) was arguably the best known of the Anastasia impersonators. In February 1920 she was institutionalized in a Berlin mental hospital after a suicide attempt. She initially refused to identify herself, later going by "Anna Tchaikowsky". Over the next few years, the woman was identified by several White Russian émigrés as Anastasia. She lived with a succession of émigrés and exiled White Russian nobles, with varying degrees of belief or skepticism in her identity as Anastasia. She eventually died in the United States in 1984.

=== Literary and stage adaptation ===
Anderson's supposed identity was a popular sensation from the early-to-mid 1920s, with various books and pamphlets repeating her claims published throughout the years.

Two such books, the pro-Anderson Harriet von Rathlef's Anastasia, ein Frauenschicksal als Spiegel der Weltkatastrophe (Anastasia, a Woman's Fate as Mirror of the World Catastrophe) and the anti-Anderson Pierre Gilliard and Constantin Savitch's La Fausse Anastasie (The False Anastasia) were adapted into a play by French dramatist Marcelle Maurette, which toured Europe and America with Viveca Lindfors in the title role.

While the play and film depict Tsarina Maria Feodorovna as privately accepting Anna's legitimacy, the actual Tsarina publicly denounced the Anderson as an imposter in 1928. The Copenhagen Statement, as it would come to be known, explained: "Our sense of duty compels us to state that the story is only a fairy tale. The memory of our dear departed would be tarnished if we allowed this fantastic story to spread and gain any credence."

The play and film do not reveal whether Anna is the Romanov princess, but suggests through subtle hints that she is. The gradual realization of her true identity is juxtaposed against Bounine's growing romantic interest in Anna. In one speech, he says to Anna/Anastasia that he cares for who she is and not what her name is.

== Production ==
=== Casting ===
The film marked Bergman's return to working for a Hollywood studio after several years of working in Italy with her husband, Roberto Rossellini. (Their marriage had caused a scandal, as he divorced his then current wife, Marcella DeMarchis to be with her.)

The film was also a comeback for Helen Hayes. She had suspended her career for several years due to the death of her daughter Mary, and her husband's failing health.

=== Filming ===
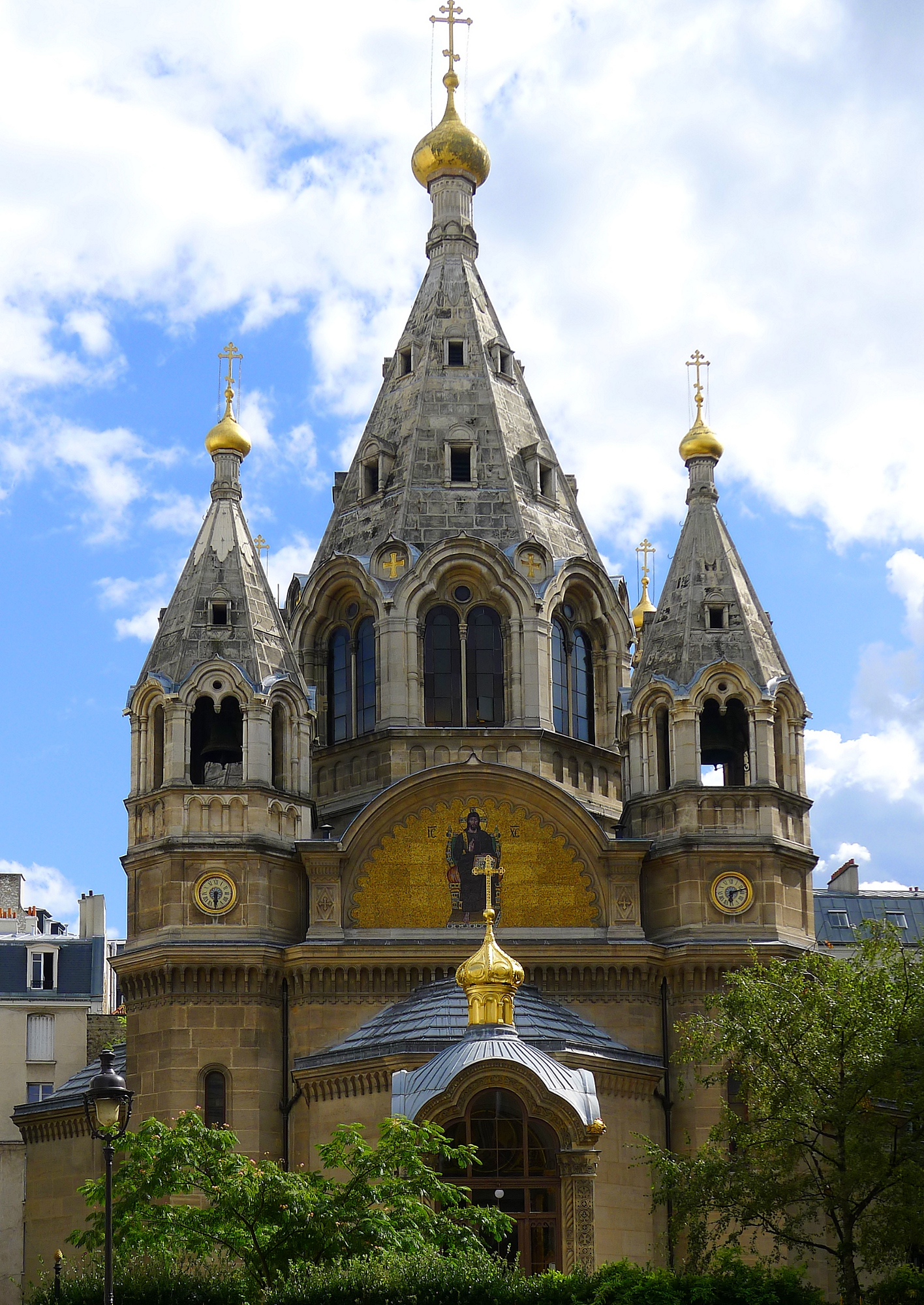
Alexander Nevsky Cathedral, Paris.

Exterior filming for Anastasia took place primarily on-location in Paris, with a second unit capturing location footage of Copenhagen. The Alexander Nevsky Russian Orthodox Cathedral in Paris, which was a center of worship for Russian aristocrats and other émigrés from St. Petersburg in the city, is featured in one of the early scenes.

The studio interiors were shot at MGM-British Studios at Borehamwood, England. Knebworth House was used to represent the Empress Marie's palace.

== Reception ==
=== Critical response ===
The film received generally positive reviews from critics. The review aggregator website Rotten Tomatoes reported that 92% of critics have given the film a positive review based on 52 reviews. On Metacritic, the film has an average score of 61 out of 100 based on 19 reviews, indicating "generally favorable" reviews.

Mae Tinee of the Chicago Tribune called the film "Beautifully balanced with history and fantasy woven into a background of searing sorrow and royal pomp, this is one of the year's most enjoyable films. It is presented with wit, warmth, delicacy, and skill."

Many critics emphasized the film's status as Ingrid Bergman's comeback vehicle. Jean Yothers of the Orlando Sentinel wrote "After an absence of seven years from American-made films, beauteous Ingrid Bergman returns triumphantly." Moira Walsh of America wrote "Given a chance, Miss Bergman looks as lovely as ever and gives an effective high-tension performance."

Some critics believed the film was bound too much to the static settings and theatrical "scenes" of the play, but additional, essentially decorative, ball scenes were added to open up the action.

=== Awards and nominations ===
Award	Category	Nominee(s)	Result
Academy Awards	Best Actress	Ingrid Bergman	Won
Academy Awards	Best Music Score of a Dramatic or Comedy Picture	Alfred Newman	Nominated
British Academy Film Awards	Best Screenplay	Arthur Laurents	Nominated
David di Donatello Awards	Best Foreign Actress	Ingrid Bergman	Won
Golden Globe Awards	Best Actress in a Motion Picture – Drama	Ingrid Bergman	Won
Golden Globe Awards	Best Actress in a Motion Picture – Drama	Helen Hayes	Nominated
National Board of Review Awards	Top Ten Films		8th Place
National Board of Review Awards	Best Actor	Yul Brynner (also for The King and I and The Ten Commandments)	Won
New York Film Critics Circle Awards	Best Actor	Yul Brynner (also for The King and I and The Ten Commandments)	Nominated
New York Film Critics Circle Awards	Best Actress	Ingrid Bergman	Won
Photoplay Awards	Most Popular Male Star	Yul Brynner	Nominated

== Twin film ==
A West German film based on Anna Anderson, The Story of Anastasia (German: Anastasia, die letzte Zarentochter) was released the same year. Both films star Ivan Desny. (see: twin films)

== See also ==
- List of American films of 1956
- The Story of Anastasia
- Anastasia: The Mystery of Anna
- Anastasia (1997 film)
- Romanov impostors
