= Victor Dupré =

Victor Dupré may refer to:

- Léon-Victor Dupré (1816–1879), French landscape painter
- Victor Dupré (cyclist) (1884–1938), French track cyclist
