= Marcelle Maurette =

French writer (1903-1972)

- Marcelle Maurette in 1937
- Born: 14 November 1903; Toulouse
- Died: 24 October 1972 (aged 68); 16th arrondissement of Paris
- Occupations: Playwright; Screenwriter
- Writing career
- Notable work: Anastasia

Marcelle Maurette (14 November 1903 – 24 October 1972) was a French playwright and screenwriter. She gained international prominence for her play Anastasia, based on the phenomenon of Anastasia impersonators. She was considered a prominent literary figure in her native France, receiving the Legion of Honour, Order of Arts and Letters, and the Prix Thiers, among other accoaldes.

== Early life ==
Marcelle Marie Joséphine Maurette was born in Toulouse to General Georges Maurette and Marie-Louise Donbernard, on 14 November 1903. (See "Birthdate notes" section lower down page.) She was educated at St. Nom de Jésus, Toulouse, Cours Bouchut, Paris, and the Convent of the Filles de Notre Dame, Limoges. The painter Ingres was her great-great-uncle.

She began writing as a teenager: short stories, articles and poems, for which she won prizes. In 1931 she married Count Yves de Becdelièvre who would later write a book about her: Marcelle Maurette, ma femme: journal de sa vie, 1903–1972. She was energetic and outgoing, enjoying socialising with her upper-class friends as much as her theatre and cinema work.

== Theatre, cinema, and other writing ==
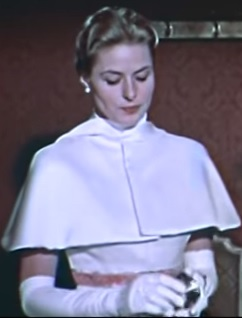
Bergman in Anastasia, 1956

In 1937 Maurette began to concentrate on writing plays, and in 1942 stopped working as a journalist and reviewer as she took up screenwriting too.

In the 1930s, when her theatrical work began to flourish, more French women than ever before were being recognised for their talent as dramatists and seeing their plays performed on the Parisian stage. Maurette was part of a contemporary move away from "literary" plays towards theatricality. Often she chose to portray "exceptional women" with "tragic lives". In this she was supported by the director Gaston Baty who rejected literary theatre while also avoiding naturalism, and staged four of her plays: Madame Capet, Manon Lescaut, Marie Stuart and Neiges. One critic believes that working with Baty helped Maurette find the right direction for her work.

The peak of her career came in the 1950s as a result of writing Anastasia. This play quickly moved beyond France to six other European countries and to the USA. An English translation/adaptation by Guy Bolton (1952) was staged in England by Mary Kerridge and John Counsell, then in 1953 shown on television where Vivien Leigh saw it and recommended it to her husband Laurence Olivier for a London production at the St. James's Theatre. It opened in New York on Broadway at the Lyceum in early 1955. In 1956 the play was presented at the Falmouth Playhouse in Massachusetts with the Mexican actress Dolores del Río and continued with a tour of seven other theaters throughout New England. Then, after bidding in competition with Warner and Metro-Goldwyn-Mayer, 20th Century Fox bought the rights for the 1956 film version of Anastasia with Ingrid Bergman and Yul Brynner, for "more than £20,000".

Other plays by Marcelle Maurette that have been shown in English-speaking countries are Madame Capet at the Cort Theatre, New York in 1938, Thérèse Raquin at the Edinburgh Royal Lyceum Theatre and the London Winter Garden Theatre in 1955, and Inquiry at Lisieux in the Dublin Theatre Festival 1963. She wrote screenplays for The Strange Madame X and for Sarajevo.

Her television plays also had some success, and she published a few books with historical themes.

== Awards and memberships ==
In 1950 she was made a chevalier of the Légion d'honneur and promoted to officier in 1964. She was a commander of the Ordre des Arts et des Lettres. The Académie française awarded her two literary prizes: in 1952 the Prix Thiers and in 1962 the Prix Paul Flat. She was a member of various prestigious literary societies: the Société des auteurs et compositeurs dramatiques, the Société des gens de lettres, the Société des poètes français, and the Académie des Jeux Floraux de Toulouse. She was also on the Council of Administration of the ORTF, the French broadcasting organisation.

== Legacy ==
Marcelle Maurette died on 24 October 1972, and was buried at Guémené-Penfao, country home of the Becdelièvre family. She left behind about thirty works, in print and/or on film. The French National Library has a Maurette collection including scrapbooks with photographs and newspaper clippings for certain productions. A library at Guémené-Penfao has been named after her: the Médiathèque Marcelle Maurette.

== Works ==
=== Plays ===
- 1931: Printemps
- 1934: Celle qui revint
- 1937: Madame Capet
- 1939: Manon Lescaut, after l'Abbé Prévost
- 1941: Marie Stuart
- 1945: Le Roi Christine
- 1948: Thérèse Raquin, after Émile Zola
- 1949: Neiges, co-writer Georgette Paul
- 1950: Anna Karénine, after Tolstoy
- 1954: L'Affaire Lafarge
- 1952: Anastasia
- 1962: La Nuit de feu
- 1966: Laurette or l'Amour voleur
- 1978: Rayons de gloire

=== Films ===
- 1940: De Mayerling à Sarajevo directed by Max Ophüls
- 1943: Mermoz directed by Louis Cuny
- 1946: Étrange Destin directed by Louis Cuny
- 1951: L'Étrange Madame X directed by Jean Grémillon
- 1953: Anastasia, for UK TV BBC Sunday Night Theatre
- 1956: Anastasia directed by Anatole Litvak
- 1961: Anna Karénine, for TV
- 1961: Le Procès de Sainte-Thérèse de l'enfant Jésus, for TV
- 1964: La Nuit de feu, for TV
- 1967: L'Affaire Lourdes for TV
- 1967: Il processo di Santa Teresa del bambino Gesù, for Italian TV
- 1970: Thérèse d'Avila for TV
- 1970: La Possédée, for TV
- 1972: L'Image, for TV
- 1973: Laurette or l'Amour voleur, for TV
- 1997: Anastasia directed by Don Bluth and Gary Goldman, after Maurette's play

=== Books ===
- 1939: La Vraie Dame aux Camélias ou l'Amoureuse sans amour, pub. Michel Albin
- 1951: La Vie Privée de Madame de Pompadour, pub. Hachette
- 1963: Le Procès de Sainte Thérèse de l'Enfant Jésus, pub. Cerf
- 1967: Guillaume le conquérant, la vie quotidienne des médecins au temps de Molière la révolution française, co-author, pub. le Cercle Historia (Sceaux)

== Birthdate notes ==
Two different birth years, 1903 and 1909, are given by people writing about Maurette.

=== 14 November 1903 ===
- Her husband's book about her, written after her death, gives the 1903 birthdate in its title: Marcelle Maurette, ma femme: journal de sa vie, 1903-1972.
- The French National Library gives her dates as 1903 – 1972, as do other academic libraries.
- 14 November 1903 is the date given an article by a member of the Becdelièvre family.
- Mademoiselle Marcelle Maurette is mentioned, with her parents, in a Toulouse newspaper announcement about a church service in May 1909, so six months before any possible 1909 November birthday.

=== 14 November 1909 ===
- There are several images of official-looking documents, copies of birth and marriage certificates etc., giving her birth year as 1909, on the website of the French Ministry of Culture.
- 1909 is found in some directories of the "Who's Who" kind, and in other reference books.
