= Anna Anderson =

Impostor of Grand Duchess Anastasia (1896–1984)

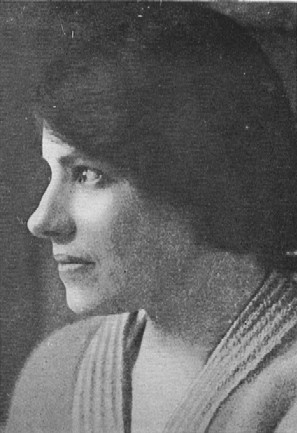
- Anderson in 1922
- Born: Franziska Schanzkowska; 16 December 1896; Borrowilaß, Kingdom of Prussia, German Empire
- Died: 12 February 1984 (aged 87); Charlottesville, Virginia, U.S.
- Other names: Fräulein Unbekannt; Anna Tschaikovsky; Anastasia Tschaikovsky; Anastasia Manahan
- Known for: Impostor of Grand Duchess Anastasia Nikolaevna of Russia
- Spouse: Jack Manahan (m. 1968)

Anna Anderson (born Franziska Schanzkowska; 16 December 1896 – 12 February 1984) was an impostor who claimed to be Grand Duchess Anastasia Nikolaevna of Russia. Anastasia, the youngest daughter of the last Tsar and Tsarina of Russia, Nicholas II and Alexandra, was murdered along with her parents and siblings on 17 July 1918 by Bolshevik revolutionaries in Yekaterinburg, Russia, but the location of her body was unknown until 2007.

In 1920, Anderson was institutionalized in a mental hospital after a suicide attempt in Berlin. At first, she went by the name Fräulein Unbekannt (German for Miss Unknown) as she refused to reveal her identity. Later, she used the name Tschaikovsky and then Anderson. In March 1922, claims that Anderson was a Russian grand duchess received public attention. Most members of Grand Duchess Anastasia's family and those who had known her, including court tutor Pierre Gilliard, said Anderson was an impostor but others were convinced she was Anastasia. In 1927, a private investigation funded by the Tsarina's brother, Ernest Louis, Grand Duke of Hesse, identified Anderson as Franziska Schanzkowska, a Polish factory worker with a history of mental illness. After a lawsuit lasting many years, the German courts ruled that Anderson had failed to prove she was Anastasia, but through media coverage, her claim gained notoriety.

Between 1920 and 1968, Anderson lived in Germany and the United States with various supporters and in nursing homes and sanatoria, including at least one asylum. She emigrated to the United States in 1968. Shortly before the expiration of her visa she married history professor Jack Manahan, who was later characterized as "probably Charlottesville's best-loved eccentric". Upon her death in 1984, Anderson's body was cremated, and her ashes were buried in the churchyard at Castle Seeon, Germany.

After the collapse of the Soviet Union, the locations of the bodies of the Tsar, Tsarina, and all five of their children were revealed. Multiple laboratories in different countries confirmed their identity through DNA testing. DNA tests on a lock of Anderson's hair and surviving medical samples of her tissue showed that her DNA did not match that of the Romanov remains or that of living relatives of the Romanovs. Instead, Anderson's mitochondrial DNA matched that of Karl Maucher, a great-nephew of Franziska Schanzkowska. Most scientists, historians and journalists who have discussed the case accept that Anderson and Schanzkowska were the same person.

== Dalldorf asylum (1920–1922) ==
On 27 February 1920, an unidentified young woman attempted to commit suicide in Berlin by jumping off the Bendlerstrasse bridge into the Landwehrkanal. She was rescued by a police sergeant and was admitted to the Elisabeth Hospital on Lützowstrasse. As she was without papers and refused to identify herself, she was admitted as Fräulein Unbekannt ("Miss Unknown") to a mental hospital in Dalldorf (now Wittenau, in Reinickendorf), where she remained for the next two years. The unknown patient had scars on her head and body and spoke German with an accent described as "Russian" by medical staff.

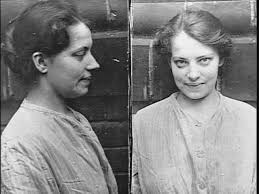
Photographs taken of Anna Anderson at Dalldorf Asylum after her suicide attempt in 1920.

In early 1922, Clara Peuthert, a fellow psychiatric patient, claimed that the unidentified woman was Grand Duchess Tatiana of Russia, one of the four daughters of Tsar Nicholas II. On her release, Peuthert told Russian émigré Captain Nicholas von Schwabe that she had seen Tatiana at Dalldorf. Schwabe visited the asylum and accepted the woman as Tatiana. Schwabe persuaded other émigrés to visit the unknown woman, including Countess Zinaida Tolstoy, a friend of Tsarina Alexandra. Eventually Baroness Sophie Buxhoeveden, a former lady-in-waiting to the Tsarina, visited the asylum with Tolstoy. On seeing the woman, Buxhoeveden declared "She's too short for Tatiana," and left convinced the woman was not a Russian grand duchess. A few days later, the unknown woman noted, "I did not say I was Tatiana."

A nurse at Dalldorf, Thea Malinovsky, claimed years after the patient's release from the asylum that the woman had told her she was another daughter of the Tsar, Anastasia, in the autumn of 1921. However, the patient herself could not recall the incident. Her biographers either ignore Malinovsky's claim, or weave it into their narrative.

== Germany and Switzerland (1922–1927) ==
By May 1922, the woman was believed by Peuthert, Schwabe, and Tolstoy to be Anastasia, although Buxhoeveden said there was no resemblance. Nevertheless, the woman was taken out of the asylum and given a room in the Berlin home of Baron Arthur von Kleist, a Russian émigré who had been a police chief in Russian Poland before the fall of the Tsar. The Berlin policeman who handled the case, Detective Inspector Franz Grünberg, thought that Kleist "may have had ulterior motives, as was hinted at in émigré circles: if the old conditions should ever be restored in Russia, he hoped for great advancement from having looked after the young woman."

She began calling herself Anna Tschaikovsky, choosing "Anna" as a short form of "Anastasia", although Peuthert "described her everywhere as Anastasia". Tschaikovsky stayed in the houses of acquaintances, including Kleist, Peuthert, a poor working-class family called Bachmann, and at Inspector Grünberg's estate at Funkenmühle, near Zossen. At Funkenmühle, Grünberg arranged for the Tsarina's sister, Princess Irene of Hesse and by Rhine, to meet Tschaikovsky, but Irene did not recognize her. Grünberg also arranged a visit from Crown Princess Cecilie of Prussia, but Tschaikovsky refused to speak to her, and Cecilie was left perplexed by the encounter. Later, in the 1950s, Cecilie signed a declaration that Tschaikovsky was Anastasia, but Cecilie's family disputed her statement and implied that she had dementia.

By 1925, Tschaikovsky had developed a tuberculous infection of her arm, and she was placed in a succession of hospitals for treatment. Sick and near death, she lost significant weight. She was visited by the Tsarina's groom of the chamber Alexei Volkov; Anastasia's tutor Pierre Gilliard; his wife, Alexandra Tegleva, who had been Anastasia's nursemaid; and the Tsar's sister, Grand Duchess Olga. Although they expressed sympathy, if only for Tschaikovsky's illness, and made no immediate public declarations, eventually they all denied she was Anastasia. In March 1926, she convalesced in Lugano with Harriet von Rathlef at the expense of Grand Duchess Anastasia's great-uncle, Prince Valdemar of Denmark. Valdemar was willing to offer Tschaikovsky material assistance, through the Danish ambassador to Germany, Herluf Zahle, while her identity was investigated. To allow her to travel, the Berlin Aliens Office issued her with a temporary certificate of identity as "Anastasia Tschaikovsky", with Grand Duchess Anastasia's personal details. After a quarrel with Rathlef, Tschaikovsky was moved to the Stillachhaus Sanatorium at Oberstdorf in the Bavarian Alps in June 1926, and Rathlef returned to Berlin.

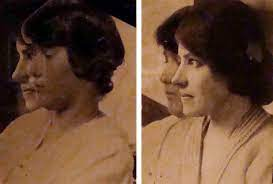
A comparison on the side profiles of Anastasia Nikolaevna and Anna Anderson, created by Pierre Gilliard

At Oberstdorf, Tschaikovsky was visited by Tatiana Melnik, née Botkin. Melnik was the niece of Serge Botkin, the head of the Russian refugee office in Berlin, and the daughter of the imperial family's personal physician, Eugene Botkin, who had been murdered by the Bolsheviks alongside the Tsar's family in 1918. Tatiana Melnik had met Grand Duchess Anastasia as a child and had last spoken to her in February 1917. To Melnik, Tschaikovsky looked like Anastasia, even though "the mouth has changed and coarsened noticeably, and because the face is so lean, her nose looks bigger than it was." In a letter, Melnik wrote: "Her attitude is childlike, and altogether she cannot be reckoned with as a responsible adult, but must be led and directed like a child. She has not only forgotten languages, but has in general lost the power of accurate narration ... even the simplest stories she tells incoherently and incorrectly; they are really only words strung together in impossibly ungrammatical German ... Her defect is obviously in her memory and eyesight." Melnik declared that Tschaikovsky was Anastasia, and supposed that any inability on her part to remember events and her refusal to speak Russian was caused by her impaired physical and psychological state. Either inadvertently through a sincere desire to "aid the patient's weak memory", or as part of a deliberate charade, Melnik coached Tschaikovsky with details of life in the imperial family.

== Castle Seeon (1927) ==
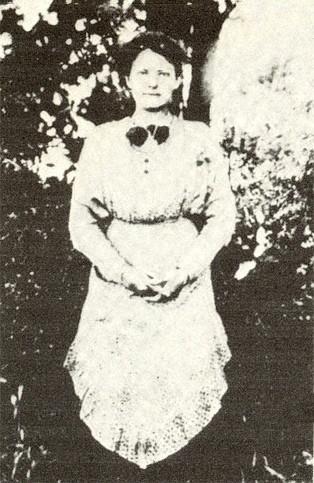
Franziska Schanzkowska, c. 1913

In 1927, under pressure from his family, Valdemar decided against providing Tschaikovsky with any further financial support, and the funds from Denmark were cut off. Duke George of Leuchtenberg, a distant relative of the Tsar, gave her a home at Castle Seeon. The Tsarina's brother, Ernest Louis, Grand Duke of Hesse, hired a private detective, Martin Knopf, to investigate the claims that Tschaikovsky was Anastasia.

During her stay at Castle Seeon, Knopf reported that Tschaikovsky was actually a Polish factory worker called Franziska Schanzkowska. Schanzkowska had worked in a munitions factory during World War I when, shortly after her fiancé had been killed at the front, a grenade fell out of her hand and exploded. She had been injured in the head, and a foreman was killed in front of her. She became apathetic and depressed, was declared insane on 19 September 1916, and spent time in two lunatic asylums. In early 1920, she was reported missing from her Berlin lodgings, and since then had not been seen or heard from by her family. In May 1927, Franziska's brother Felix Schanzkowski was introduced to Tschaikovsky at a local inn in Wasserburg near Castle Seeon. Leuchtenberg's son, Dmitri, was completely certain that Tschaikovsky was an impostor and that she was recognized by Felix as his sister, but Leuchtenberg's daughter, Natalie, remained convinced of Tschaikovsky's authenticity. Leuchtenberg himself was ambivalent. According to one account, initially Felix declared that Tschaikovsky was his sister Franziska, but the affidavit he signed spoke only of a "strong resemblance", highlighted physical differences, and said she did not recognize him. Years later, Felix's family said that he knew Tschaikovsky was his sister, but he had chosen to leave her to her new life, which was far more comfortable than any alternative.

Visitors to Seeon included Prince Felix Yusupov, husband of Anastasia's paternal cousin Princess Irina Alexandrovna of Russia, who wrote,

I claim categorically that she is not Anastasia Nicolaievna, but just an adventuress, a sick hysteric and a frightful playactress. I simply cannot understand how anyone can be in doubt of this. If you had seen her, I am convinced that you would recoil in horror at the thought that this frightful creature could be a daughter of our Tsar. [emphasis in original]

Other visitors, however, such as Felix Dassel, an officer whom Anastasia had visited in hospital during 1916, and Gleb Botkin, who had known Anastasia as a child and was Tatiana Melnik's brother, were convinced that Tschaikovsky was genuine.

== United States (1928–1931) ==
By 1928, Tschaikovsky's claim had received interest and attention in the United States, where Gleb Botkin had published articles in support of her cause. Botkin's publicity caught the attention of a distant cousin of Anastasia's, Xenia Leeds, a former Russian princess who had married a wealthy American industrialist. Botkin and Leeds arranged for Tschaikovsky to travel to the United States on board the liner Berengaria at Leeds's expense. On the journey from Seeon to the States, Tschaikovsky stopped at Paris, where she met Grand Duke Andrei Vladimirovich of Russia, the Tsar's cousin, who believed her to be Anastasia. For six months Tschaikovsky lived at the estate of the Leeds family in Oyster Bay, New York.

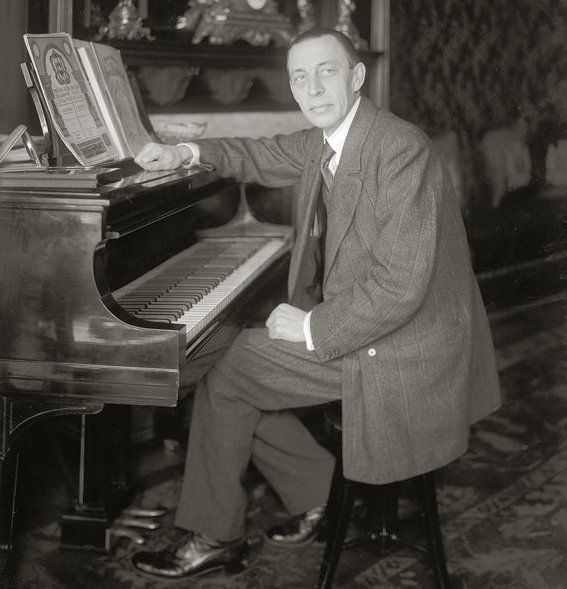
Pianist and composer Sergei Rachmaninoff paid for Anna to stay at the Garden City Hotel on Long Island, where she first used the name Anderson.

As the tenth anniversary of the Tsar's execution approached in July 1928, Botkin retained a lawyer, Edward Fallows, to oversee legal moves to obtain any of the Tsar's estate outside of the Soviet Union. As the death of the Tsar had never been proved, the estate could only be released to relatives ten years after the supposed date of his death. Fallows set up a company, called the Grandanor Corporation (an acronym of Grand Duchess Anastasia of Russia), which sought to raise funds by selling shares in any prospective estate. Tschaikovsky claimed that the Tsar had deposited money abroad, which fed unsubstantiated rumors of a large Romanov fortune in England. The surviving relatives of the Romanovs accused Botkin and Fallows of fortune hunting, and Botkin accused them of trying to defraud "Anastasia" out of her inheritance. Except for a relatively small deposit in Germany, distributed to the Tsar's recognized relations, no money was ever found. After a quarrel, possibly over Tschaikovsky's claim to the estate (but not over her claim to be Anastasia), Tschaikovsky moved out of the Leeds' mansion, and the pianist Sergei Rachmaninoff arranged for her to live at the Garden City Hotel in Hempstead, New York, and later in a small cottage. To avoid the press, she was booked in as Mrs. Anderson, the name by which she was subsequently known. In October 1928, after the death of the Tsar's mother, the Dowager Empress Marie, the 12 nearest relations of the Tsar met at Marie's funeral and signed a declaration that denounced Anderson as an impostor. The Copenhagen Statement, as it would come to be known, explained: "Our sense of duty compels us to state that the story is only a fairy tale. The memory of our dear departed would be tarnished if we allowed this fantastic story to spread and gain any credence." Gleb Botkin answered with a public letter to Grand Duchess Xenia Alexandrovna of Russia, which referred to the family as "greedy and unscrupulous" and claimed they were only denouncing Anderson for money.

From early 1929 Anderson lived with Annie Burr Jennings, a wealthy Park Avenue spinster happy to host someone she supposed to be a daughter of the Tsar. For eighteen months, Anderson was the toast of New York City society. Then a pattern of self-destructive behavior began that culminated in her throwing tantrums, killing her pet parakeet, and on one occasion running around naked on the roof. On 24 July 1930, Judge Peter Schmuck of the New York Supreme Court signed an order committing her to a mental hospital. Before she could be taken away, Anderson locked herself in her room, and the door was broken in with an axe. She was forcibly taken to the Four Winds Sanatorium in Westchester County, New York, where she remained for slightly over a year. In August 1931, Anderson returned to Germany accompanied by a private nurse in a locked cabin on the liner Deutschland. Jennings paid for the voyage, the stay at the Westchester sanatorium, and an additional six months' care in the psychiatric wing of a nursing home at Ilten near Hanover. On arrival at Ilten, Anderson was assessed as sane, but as the room was prepaid, and she had nowhere else to go, she stayed on in a suite in the sanatorium grounds.

== Germany (1931–1968) ==
Anderson's return to Germany generated press interest, and drew more members of the German aristocracy to her cause. She again lived itinerantly as a guest of her well-wishers. In 1932, the British tabloid News of the World published a sensational story accusing her of being a Romanian actress who was perpetrating a fraud. Her lawyer, Fallows, filed suit for libel, but the lengthy case continued until the outbreak of World War II, at which time the case was dismissed because Anderson was living in Germany, and German residents could not sue in enemy countries. From 1938, lawyers acting for Anderson in Germany contested the distribution of the Tsar's estate to his recognized relations, and they in turn contested her identity. The litigation continued intermittently without resolution for decades; Lord Mountbatten footed some of his German relations' legal bills against Anderson. The protracted proceedings became the longest-running lawsuit in German history.

Anderson had a final meeting with the Schanzkowski family in 1938. Gertrude Schanzkowska was insistent that Anderson was her sister, Franziska, but the Nazi government had arranged the meeting to determine Anderson's identity, and if accepted as Schanzkowska she would be imprisoned. The Schanzkowski family refused to sign affidavits against her, and no further action was taken. In 1940, Edward Fallows died virtually destitute after wasting all his own money on trying to obtain the Tsar's nonexistent fortune for the Grandanor Corporation. Toward the end of World War II, Anderson lived at Schloss Winterstein with Louise of Saxe-Meiningen, in what became the Soviet occupation zone. In 1946, Prince Frederick of Saxe-Altenburg helped her across the border to Bad Liebenzell in the French occupation zone.

Prince Frederick settled Anderson in a former army barracks in the small village of Unterlengenhardt, on the edge of the Black Forest, where she became a sort of tourist attraction. Lili Dehn, a friend of Tsarina Alexandra, visited her and acknowledged her as Anastasia, but when Charles Sydney Gibbes, English tutor to the imperial children, met Anderson, he denounced her as a fraud. In an affidavit, he swore, "She in no way resembles the true Grand Duchess Anastasia that I had known ... I am quite satisfied that she is an impostor." She became a recluse, surrounded by cats, and her house began to decay. In May 1968, Anderson was taken to a hospital at Neuenbürg after being discovered semi-conscious in her cottage. In her absence, Prince Frederick cleaned up the property by order of the local board of health. Her Irish Wolfhound and 60 cats were put to death. Horrified by this, Anderson accepted her long-term supporter Gleb Botkin's offer to move back to the United States.

== Final years (1968–1984) ==
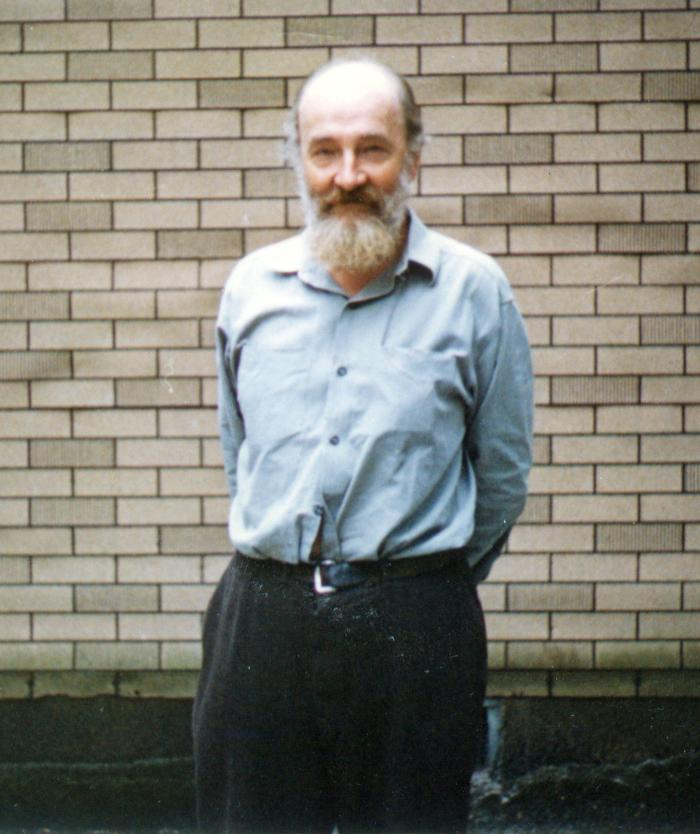
Anderson's long-time supporter Gleb Botkin, c. 1960

Botkin was living in the university town of Charlottesville, Virginia, and a local friend of his, history professor and genealogist John Eacott "Jack" Manahan, paid for Anderson's journey to the United States. She entered the country on a six-month visitor's visa, and shortly before it was due to expire, Anderson married Manahan, who was 20 years her junior, in a civil ceremony on 23 December 1968. Botkin was best man. Jack Manahan enjoyed this marriage of convenience, and described himself as "Grand Duke-in-Waiting" or "son-in-law to the Tsar". The couple lived in separate bedrooms in a house on University Circle in Charlottesville, and also owned a farm near Scottsville. Botkin died in December 1969. In February of the following year, 1970, the lawsuits finally came to an end, with neither side able to establish Anderson's identity.

Manahan and Anderson, now legally called Anastasia Manahan, became well known in the Charlottesville area as eccentrics. Though Jack Manahan was wealthy, they lived in squalor with large numbers of dogs and cats, and piles of garbage. On 20 August 1979, Anderson was taken to Charlottesville's Martha Jefferson Hospital with an intestinal obstruction. A gangrenous tumor and a length of intestine were removed by Dr. Richard Shrum.

With both Manahan and Anderson in failing health, in November 1983, Anderson was institutionalized, and an attorney, William Preston, was appointed as her guardian by the local circuit court. A few days later, Manahan "kidnapped" Anderson from the hospital, and for three days they drove around Virginia eating out of convenience stores. After a 13-state police alarm, they were found and Anderson was returned to a care facility. In January she was thought to have had a stroke, and on 12 February 1984, she died of pneumonia. She was cremated the same day, and her ashes were buried in the churchyard at Castle Seeon on 18 June 1984. Manahan died on 22 March 1990.

== DNA evidence ==
In 1991, the bodies of Tsar Nicholas II, Tsarina Alexandra, and three of their daughters were exhumed from a mass grave near Yekaterinburg. They were identified on the basis of both skeletal analysis and DNA testing. For example, mitochondrial DNA was used to match maternal relations, and mitochondrial DNA from the female bones matched that of Prince Philip, Duke of Edinburgh, whose maternal grandmother Princess Victoria of Hesse and by Rhine was a sister of Alexandra. The bodies of Tsarevich Alexei and the remaining daughter were discovered in 2007. Repeated and independent DNA tests confirmed that the remains were the seven members of the Romanov family, and proved that none of the Tsar's four daughters survived the shooting of the Romanov family.

A sample of Anderson's tissue, part of her intestine removed during an operation in 1979, had been stored at Martha Jefferson Hospital, Charlottesville, Virginia. Anderson's mitochondrial DNA was extracted from the sample and compared with that of the Romanovs and their relatives. It did not match that of the Duke of Edinburgh or that of the bones, confirming that Anderson was not related to the Romanovs. However, the sample matched DNA provided by Karl Maucher, a grandson of Franziska Schanzkowska's sister, Gertrude (Schanzkowska) Ellerik, indicating that Karl Maucher and Anna Anderson were maternally related and that Anderson was Schanzkowska. Five years after the original testing was done, Dr. Terry Melton of the Department of Anthropology, Pennsylvania State University, stated that the DNA sequence tying Anderson to the Schanzkowski family was "still unique", though the database of DNA patterns at the Armed Forces DNA Identification Laboratory had grown much larger, leading to "increased confidence that Anderson was indeed Franziska Schanzkowska".

Similarly, several strands of Anderson's hair, found inside an envelope in a book that had belonged to Anderson's husband, Jack Manahan, were also tested. Mitochondrial DNA from the hair matched Anderson's hospital sample and that of Schanzkowska's relative Karl Maucher, but not the Romanov remains or living relatives of the Romanovs.

== Assessment ==
Although communists had murdered the entire imperial Romanov family in July 1918, including 17-year-old Grand Duchess Anastasia, for years afterwards communist disinformation fed rumors that members of the Tsar's family had survived. The conflicting rumors about the fate of the family allowed impostors to make spurious claims that they were a surviving Romanov.

Most of the impostors were dismissed, but Anna Anderson's claim persisted. Books and pamphlets supporting her claims included Harriet von Rathlef's book Anastasia, ein Frauenschicksal als Spiegel der Weltkatastrophe (Anastasia, a Woman's Fate as Mirror of the World Catastrophe), published in Germany and Switzerland in 1928 after being serialized by the tabloid newspaper Berliner Nachtausgabe in 1927. This was countered by works such as La Fausse Anastasie (The False Anastasia) by Pierre Gilliard and Constantin Savitch, published by Payot of Paris in 1929. Conflicting testimonies and physical evidence, such as comparisons of facial characteristics, which alternately supported and contradicted Anderson's claim, were used either to bolster or counter the belief that she was Anastasia. In the absence of any direct documentary proof or solid physical evidence, the question of whether she was Anastasia was for many a matter of personal belief. As Anderson herself said, "You either believe it or you don't believe it. It doesn't matter. In no anyway whatsoever." The German courts were unable to decide her claim, and after 40 years of deliberation, ruled that it was "neither established nor refuted". Günter von Berenberg-Gossler, attorney for Anderson's opponents in the later years of the legal case, said that during the German trials "the press were always more interested in reporting her side of the story than the opposing bench's less glamorous perspective; editors often pulled journalists after reporting testimony delivered by her side and ignored the rebuttal, resulting in the public seldom getting a complete picture."

In 1957, a version of Anderson's story, pieced together by her supporters and interspersed with commentary by Roland Krug von Nidda, was published in Germany under the title Ich, Anastasia, Erzähle (I, Anastasia, an autobiography). The book included the "fantastic tale" that Anastasia escaped from Russia on a farm cart with a man called Alexander Tschaikovsky, whom she married and had a child by, before he was shot dead on a Bucharest street, and that the child, Alexei, disappeared into an orphanage. Even Anderson's supporters admitted that the details of the supposed escape "might seem bold inventions even for a dramatist", while her detractors considered "this barely credible story as a piece of far-fetched romance". Other works based on the premise that Anderson was Anastasia, written before the DNA tests, include biographies by Peter Kurth and James Blair Lovell. More recent biographies by John Klier, Robert Massie, and Greg King that describe her as an impostor were written after the DNA tests proved she was not Anastasia.

Assessments vary as to whether Anderson was a deliberate impostor, delusional, traumatized into adopting a new identity, or someone used by her supporters for their own ends. Pierre Gilliard called her "a cunning psychopath". The equation of Anderson with members of the imperial family began with Clara Peuthert in the Dalldorf Asylum, not with Anderson herself. Anderson appeared to go along with it afterward. Writer Michael Thornton thought, "Somewhere along the way she lost and rejected Schanzkowska. She lost that person totally and accepted completely she was this new person. I think it happened by accident and she was swept along on a wave of euphoria." Lord Mountbatten, a first cousin of the Romanov children, thought her supporters "simply get rich on the royalties of further books, magazine articles, plays etc." Prince Michael Romanov, a grandson of Grand Duchess Xenia Alexandrovna of Russia, said the Romanov family always knew Anderson was a fraud and looked upon her and "the three-ringed circus which danced around her, creating books and movies, as a vulgar insult to the memory of the Imperial Family."

== Fictional portrayals ==
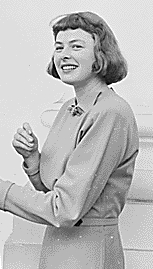
Actress Ingrid Bergman won an Academy Award for her starring role as "Anna/Anastasia" in the 1956 film Anastasia. Though inspired by Anderson's claim, the film is largely fictional.

Since the 1920s, many fictional works have been inspired by Anderson's claim to be Anastasia. In 1928, the silent film Clothes Make the Woman was based very loosely on her story. In 1953, Marcelle Maurette wrote a play based on Rathlef's and Gilliard's books called Anastasia, which toured Europe and America with Viveca Lindfors in the title role. The play was so successful that in 1956 an English adaptation by Guy Bolton was made into a film, Anastasia, starring Ingrid Bergman. The plot revolves around a group of swindlers who attempt to raise money among Russian émigrés by pretending that Grand Duchess Anastasia is still alive. A suitable amnesiac, "Anna", is groomed by the swindlers to impersonate Anastasia. Anna's origins are unknown and as the play progresses hints are dropped that she could be the real Anastasia, who has lost her memory. The viewer is left to decide whether Anna really is Anastasia. Another film was released at the same time, Is Anna Anderson Anastasia? starring Lilli Palmer, which covers much the same ground, but the central character is "perhaps even more lost, mad and pathetic, but she, too, has moments when she is a woman of presence and dignity".

Playwright Royce Ryton wrote I Am Who I Am about Anna Anderson in 1978. Like the earlier plays, it depicts Anderson as "a person of intrinsic worth victimized by the greed and fears of others" and did not attempt to decide her real identity.

Sir Kenneth MacMillan's ballet Anastasia, first performed in 1967, used I, Anastasia, an autobiography as inspiration and "is a dramatic fantasy about Anna Anderson, the woman who believes herself to be Anastasia ... Either in memory or imagination, she experiences episodes from Anastasia's past ... The structure is a kind of free-wheeling nightmare, held together by the central figure of the heroine, played by Lynn Seymour". A contemporary reviewer thought Seymour's "tense, tormented portrait of the desperate Anna Anderson is quite extraordinary and really impressive". Anna Anderson was also used as a narrative device in Youri Vámos' 1992 ballet for Theater Basel, Sleeping Beauty – Last Daughter of the Czar, based on Pyotr Ilyich Tchaikovsky's Sleeping Beauty.

In 1986, a two-part fictionalized made for television mini-series titled Anastasia: The Mystery of Anna appeared (NBC in the U.S.) which starred Amy Irving and won her a Golden Globe nomination. In the words of Hal Erickson, "Irving plays the leading character in a lady-or-the-tiger fashion, so that we never know if she truly swallows her own tale or if she's merely a clever charlatan."

The central character ("Anastasia" or "Anya") of the 1997 animated fantasy Anastasia is portrayed as the actual Grand Duchess Anastasia, even though the film – produced and directed by Don Bluth and Gary Goldman – was released after DNA tests proved that Anna Anderson was not Anastasia. However, this may be due to the animated film's origin as an adaptation of Anastasia (1956) that also included story elements from Pygmalion. Though initially researching the actual events, Bluth and Goldman decided the history of Anastasia and the Romanov dynasty was too dark for their film. Indeed, the historical fact of Romanov impostors and a long artistic tradition of fictionalizing the story of Grand Duchess Anastasia suggest that the directors likely never intended to reference Anna Anderson specifically. Though generally well received, some of Anastasia's contemporary relatives felt that the film was distasteful while noting that most Romanovs have come to accept the, "repeated exploitation of Anastasia's romantic tale... with equanimity."
