= Anastasia (play) =

1952 play by Marcelle Maurette

- Official Playbill for the Broadway production
- Written by: Marcelle Maurette
- Setting: Outskirts of Berlin - 1926

Premiere
- Date premiered: 1953
- Place premiered: Theatre Royal, Windsor

Anastasia is a 1952 historical drama stage play written by French dramatist Marcelle Maurette, which is in turn inspired by the story of Anna Anderson, the best known of the many Anastasia impostors who emerged after the Imperial family were murdered in July 1918. Anastasia premiered in French in France, and caught the attention of Guy Bolton who wanted to adapt it to English.

== Synopsis ==
A former Cossack 'prince', now taxi-driver Bounine, discovers Anna an amnesiac in a Berlin asylum. Anna is mixed up in a plot to exploit Anastasia's inheritance of $10 million pounds, which is being held in a trust for any surviving heirs of the Romanov dynasty. As the scheme grows and the conspiracy prospers, Anna is trained for the last test of meeting the Imperial Grand Empress Maria, Anastasia's grandmother. Her acceptance of Anna is an essential obstacle in pulling off the conspiracy to obtain the money.

== Characters and cast members ==
Characters	London	Broadway	Paris
Characters	1953	1954	1955
Boris Chernov		Boris Turmarin	
Varya		Sefton Darr	
Petrovin		David J. Stewart	
Prince Bounine	Anthony Ireland	Joseph Anthony	Jean Le Poulain
Sergi		William Callan	
Anna	Mary Kerridge	Viveca Lindfors	Juliette Gréco
Counsellor Drivinitz		Carl Low	
Sleigh Driver		Stuart Germain	
Charwoman		Vivian Nathan	
Dr. Sirensky		Michael Strong	
Dowager Empress	Helen Haye	Eugenie Leontovich	Lucienne Bogaert
Baroness Livenbaum		Dorothy Patten	Paule Vrimond
Prince Paul		Hurd Hatfield	

== Productions ==
=== Original London production (1953 - 1955) ===
Anastasia despite being a French play, had not been staged in Paris prior to its English translation premiering in London. It was adapted into English by Guy Bolton and Anastasia premiered on 4 May 1953, at Theatre Royal, Windsor. On 30 June, it was announced Anastasia would be filmed live and broadcast on the BBC.

When the play was first broadcast on 12 July 1953 on BBC, Laurence Olivier and his wife Vivien Leigh watched the performance and were interested. After the second broadcast on 16 July, Olivier decided he would buy the rights to put the show on at the St James's Theatre. By 17 July, Olivier had secured the rights and the contract was signed.

=== Original Broadway production (1954 - 1955) ===
Plans to bring Anastasia to Broadway, began in April 1954, when producer Elaine Perry discovered the show. She reportedly intended to have the New York production star Lilli Palmer as the titular Anastasia, Rex Harrison. It was announced the production would move forward with Vivica Lindford in the lead, and that the show would have an out-of-town warm-up in New Haven, Connecticut, and Philadelphia before transferring to Broadway. Rehearsals started on November 2, 1954. Anastasia made its American debut at the Shubert Theatre in New Haven on Thursday, December 2, and played through Saturday, December 4, before moving to the Walnut Street Theatre in Philadelphia on December 6, 1954, and playing through Monday, December 13, 1954. The performances at the Walnut Theatre were extended until the evening of December 25.

After the successful early performances, Anastasia moved to New York and premiered on Broadway at the Lyceum Theatre, December 29, 1954.

It played 272 performances. Anastasia closed on September 24, 1955.

=== Original Paris production (1955 - 1956) ===
Discussions of bringing Anastasia to the Parisian stage began in 1954, with André Certes intending to have Madeleine Robinson star in the lead role.

== Adaptations ==
=== Recordings ===
On the 12 and 16 July 1953, Anastasia was filmed and broadcast on the British Broadcasting Company. The British Film Institute retains a copy of the original broadcast in their archive.

=== Films ===
There have been multiple adaptations of the play including the 1956 film of the same name starring Yul Brynner and Ingrid Bergman. In 1997, an animated film inspired by the 1956 film was produced, and in turn was based on the Maurette play.

=== Musicals ===
On November 29, 1965, the musical Anya premiered at the original Ziegfeld Theatre. The musical was based on the play, and featured a book written by George Abbot and Guy Bolton, with music and lyrics by Robert Wright and George Forrest. Wright and Forrest's music was based on the themes of Rachmaninoff. The musical was a commercial and critical failure and closed after 12 performances. In 1977, Guy Bolton wrote a new script entitled I, Anastasia which was based directly off his and Maurette's play. It was to be another musical, and would've included music by Robert Wright and George Forrest, who wrote the music for Bolton's 1965 Anastasia musical adaptation, Anya.

== Response ==
=== Critical reception ===
The original BBC broadcast of Anastasia received rave reviews from critics. The Evening News proclaimed, "Anastasia is one of those all-too-rare plays which, produced as it was last night, make for almost perfect tele-viewing." They further applauded the television medium, which provided emotional moments to actresses Mary Kerridge and Helen Haye, and gave them "...the chance to act without having to shout at a gallery."

The Broadway production opened on December 29, 1954, to mixed reviews. John Chapman of New York Daily News wrote: "Here is theatre with a capital T... one grand show filled with heroes and heroines and the dark skullduggery of a most enchanting villain." Ward Morehouse of The Herald Statesman wrote: "Anastasia is a somewhat old-fashioned play, but one that offers a lot that is theatrically effective. Its principal trouble is a weak third act."
