= Becdelièvre family =

1442 French noble family originating from Brittany

de Becdelièvre
- Noble family
- Arms: Sable, two calvary crosses flory fitchy in chief and a scallop shell in base, all argent
- Place of origin: Duchy of Brittany
- Founded: 1442
- Current head: Extant
- Historic seat: Château de la Seilleraye; Château de Boussay; Château du Grand-Quevilly; Château de l'Épinay; Château de Brumare; Château de Cany
- Titles: Mayor of Rennes (civil); Mestre de camp, Royal Navy guard, naval ensign, lieutenant-colonel (military); Bishop (ecclesiastical)
- Distinctions: Admission to the Honneurs de la Cour
- Traditions: Allegiance to the Duchy of Brittany and Kingdom of France
- Motto: Hoc Tegmine Tutus ("Safe Under This Shield")

The de Becdelièvre family is a surviving French noble family originating from Brittany, ennobled in 1442 by letters patent from the Duke of Brittany. The family branched into three main lines, which were further subdivided into several offshoots across Brittany, Normandy, and Maine. Since the mid-19th century, only the second branch, descended from Pierre de Becdelièvre, lord of Bois-Basset in the parish of Maure, has persisted.

Under the Ancien Régime, the family was prominent among Breton magistrates, producing counselors and presidents at the Parlement of Brittany, as well as counselors and two mortar chairmans at the Parlement of Normandy. It also contributed an attorney general, a president, and five first presidents to the Chamber of Accounts of Brittany, alongside two first presidents at the Court of Aids in Normandy. Notable members include Counselors of State, Knights of Malta, and the bishop of Nîmes in 1738.

== History ==
The family traces its origins to the small town of Lohéac in Brittany. Its documented lineage begins with Thomas Becdelièvre, a resident of Lohéac, whose son, Guillaume Becdelièvre of Saint-André-des-Eaux (diocese of Dol), served as secretary to Duke John IV. Guillaume was ennobled, along with his estates, on July 12, 1442, by ducal letters patent.

In 1775, the Becdelièvre de Cany branch sought admission to the Honneurs de la Cour (Honors of the Court). The royal genealogist tasked with reviewing their titles reported to Marshal du Muy: "This family descends from Guillaume Becdelièvre of Lohéac, Brittany, secretary to Duke John V in 1426, ennobled by letters patent on July 12, 1442. During the 1669 reformation of the Breton nobility, François Becdelièvre, Viscount of Bouëxic, a descendant, claimed descent from Thomas (living 1411) and Pierre (living 1350), asserting their nobility, though no supporting documents were provided."

The manuscripts of genealogist Bernard Chérin include a note reflecting local perceptions: "The common opinion among Nantais is that the Becdelièvre family stems from a Poitiers apothecary. However, Father Lobineau's 'Remarks on Some Breton Families' suggests a more plausible origin: a family from Lohéac that rose through minor judicial roles to occupy prominent positions in higher courts."

On May 14, 1669, the Chamber for the Reformation of the Breton Nobility issued a decree affirming the family's ancient noble status, tracing Guillaume Becdelièvre (ennobled 1442) as the grandson of Pierre Becdelièvre, an esquire and lord of Bouëxic, living in 1350. The Becdelièvre de Cany branch was admitted to the Honors of the Court in 1775. Since 1955, the family has been a member of the Association d'entraide de la noblesse française (ANF).

== Notable members ==
- Guillaume Becdelièvre, Lord of Bouëxic – Secretary to John IV of Brittany, ennobled in July 1442.
- Pierre Becdelièvre – Mayor of Rennes from 1485 to 1489.

=== La Busnelaye Branch, Marquises of Becdelièvre ===
- François Becdelièvre – Lord of La Busnelaye, counselor at the Parlement of Brittany (1620), first president of the Chamber of Accounts of Brittany in Nantes (1633). Married Jeanne Blanchard in 1621.
- Jean-Baptiste de Becdelièvre – Lord of La Busnelaye, son of François, attorney general at the Chamber of Accounts (1646), counselor (1649), and mortar chairman (1652) at the Parlement of Brittany. Married Louise Harrouys in 1647.
- Jean-Baptiste de Becdelièvre (1651–1736) – Son of the above, president of the Parlement of Brittany. Married Renée de Sesmaisons in 1677.
- Guillaume-Jean-Baptiste-François de Becdelièvre (1651–1733) – Son of Jean-Baptiste, made Marquis de Becdelièvre in 1717, first president of the Chamber of Accounts of Brittany (1716). Married Françoise Le Nobletz in 1705.
- Hilarion-François, Marquis de Becdelièvre (1707–1787) – Son of Guillaume, counselor to the king, first president of the Chamber of Accounts (1733). Married Marie-Anne d'Anviray de Machonville in 1740; co-founder of the Literary Chamber of Nantes.
- Hilarion-Anne-François-Philippe, Marquis de Becdelièvre (1743–1792) – Son of Hilarion-François, president at the Chamber of Accounts. Married Marie-Victoire de Coutances in 1778.
- His daughter, Marie Madeleine Juliette de Becdelièvre (1775–1840), married Louis Auguste Victor de Ghaisne de Bourmont in 1800.
- Charles-Prudent de Becdelièvre (1705–1784) – Bishop of Nîmes.

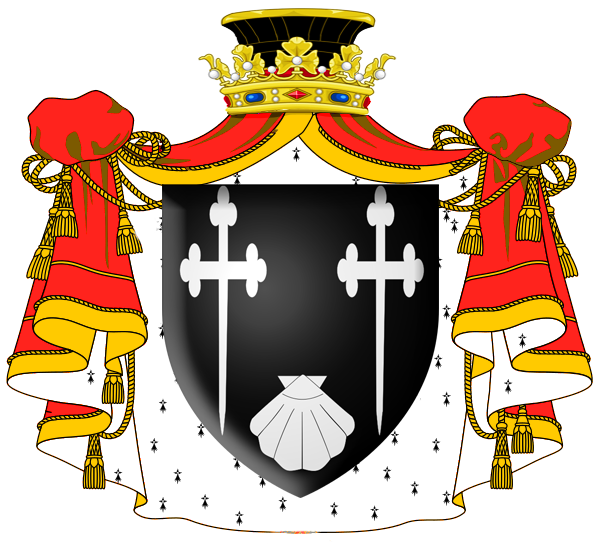
Coat of arms of Thomas-Charles de Becdelièvre (d. 1711), mortar chairman at the Parlement of Normandy.

=== Quevilly Branch ===
- René Becdelièvre – Lord of Sazilly and Quevilly, accompanied Louis XII in the Milanese conquests. Appointed governor and podestà of Alexandria in 1502, later rewarded with a counselor position in Normandy's Exchequer (1512) and keeper of the seals after Cardinal d'Amboise.
- Charles de Becdelièvre (1579–1622) – Lord of Hocqueville, gentleman of Louis XIII's chamber, Counselor of State, and mestre de camp of infantry.
- Pierre de Becdelièvre – Marquis of Quevilly (1654), Baron of Cany and Archigny, Counselor of State (1644), first president of Normandy's Court of Aids, founder of Rouen's Discalced Carmelites (1660). Married Madeleine de Moy de Breurville.
- Thomas-Charles de Becdelièvre (died 1711) – Son of Pierre, Marquis of Quevilly, Baron of Archigny, mortar chairman at the Parlement of Normandy. Married Anne Pellot in 1674.

=== Val-Hammon and Brossay branches ===
- Henri de Becdelièvre – Royal Navy guard, killed on August 24, 1704, aboard the flagship Le Foudroyant under Prince of Toulouse during the Battle of Vélez-Málaga.
- Pierre-Joseph de Becdelièvre – Knight of Malta (1718), naval ensign, died aboard the Mercure on September 13, 1746, during the Duc d'Anville expedition.
- Antoine-Pierre de Becdelièvre (1734–1759) – Royal Navy guard, killed at age 25 aboard Le Thésée on November 20, 1759, during the Battle of Quiberon Bay.
- François-Gabriel-Philippe-Narcisse de Becdelièvre, Lord of Val-Hamon (1778–1858) – Painter and scholar.
- Antoine-Gabriel de Becdelièvre (1800–1863) – Known as Count de Becdelièvre, historian, author of Biographie Liégeoise (1837).
- Louis-Aimé-Victor de Becdelièvre (1826–1871) – Known as Viscount de Becdelièvre, Saint-Cyr graduate (1848), fought in Italy (1850–1852), the Crimean War (1854–1856), and as a major in the Franco-Belgian Tirailleurs and lieutenant-colonel in the Papal Zouaves. Awarded the Legion of Honour, Crimean Medal, Pro Petri Sede Medal, and Commander of the Order of Pius IX.
- Aloÿs Anne Marie de Becdelièvre (1843–1911) – Known as Viscount de Becdelièvre, secret chamberlain to Popes Leo XIII and Pius X.

== Arms and Titles ==
"Sable, two crosses flory fitchy in chief and a scallop shell in base, all argent."

- The senior Breton branch (extinct) received the title of Viscount of Bouëxic in 1637 (extinct in the 18th century) and Marquis de Becdelièvre in 1717. Louis Philippe de Becdelièvre (1830–1882) of the Brossay branch inherited the marquisate.
- The cadet Normandy branch (extinct) obtained the Marquisate of Quevilly in May 1654, extinct by the 18th century.
- The surviving branch uses the courtesy titles of marquis, count, and viscount.

== Estates ==
- Château du Bouëxic
- Château de la Seilleraye
- Château de Boussay
- Château du Grand-Quevilly
- Château de l'Épinay
- Château de Cany
- Château de Brumare
- Château de La Bancalié
- Château du Brossay

== Gallery ==
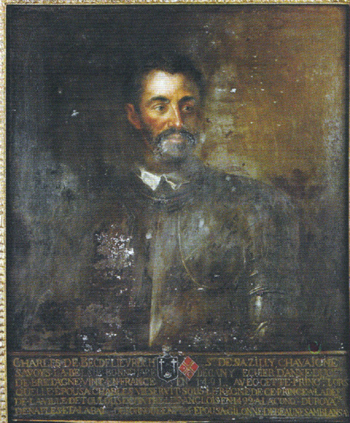
Charles de Becdelièvre

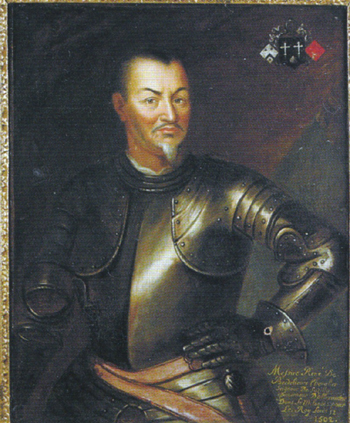
René de Becdelièvre

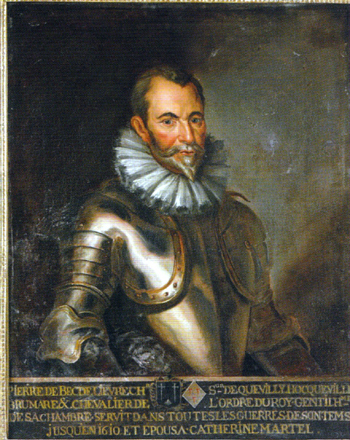
Pierre de Becdelièvre

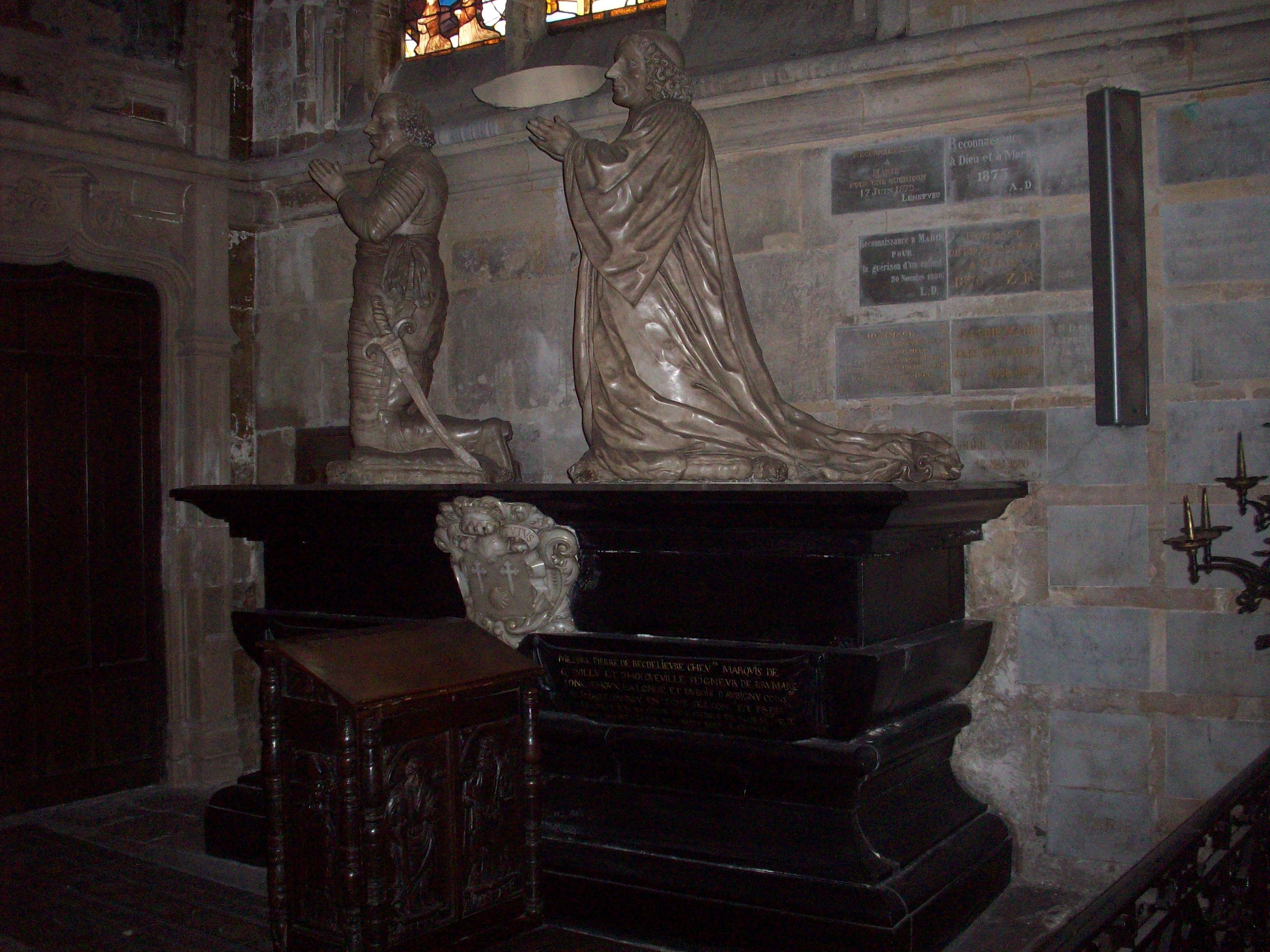
Cenotaph of Charles and Pierre de Becdelièvre, lords and marquises of Quevilly (Saint-Godard, Rouen)

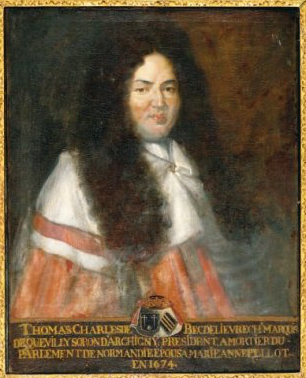
Thomas-Charles de Becdelièvre

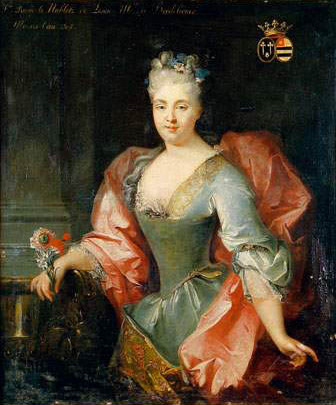
The Marquise de Becdelièvre, by Robert Tournières

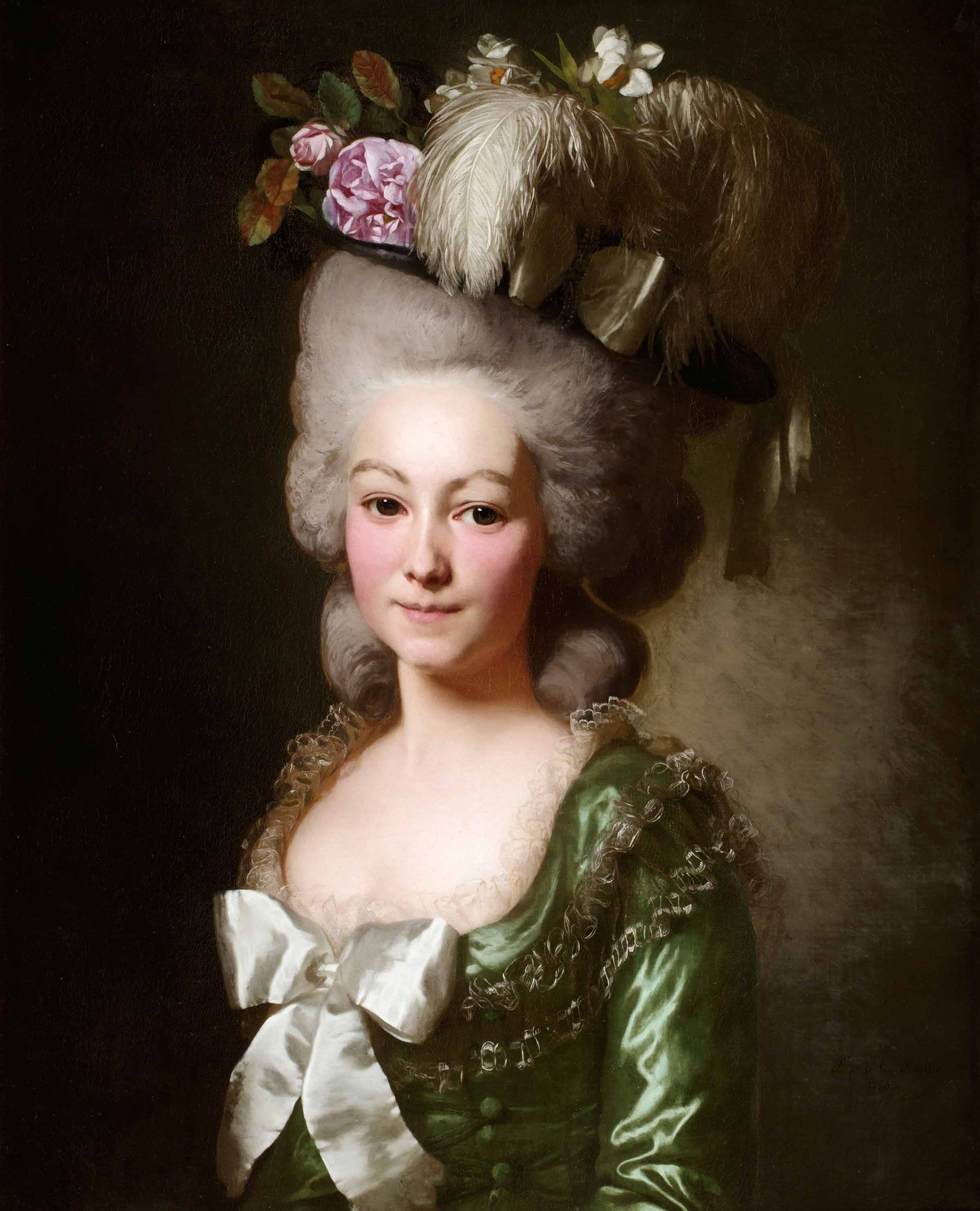
The Marquise de Becdelièvre, by Alexandre Roslin

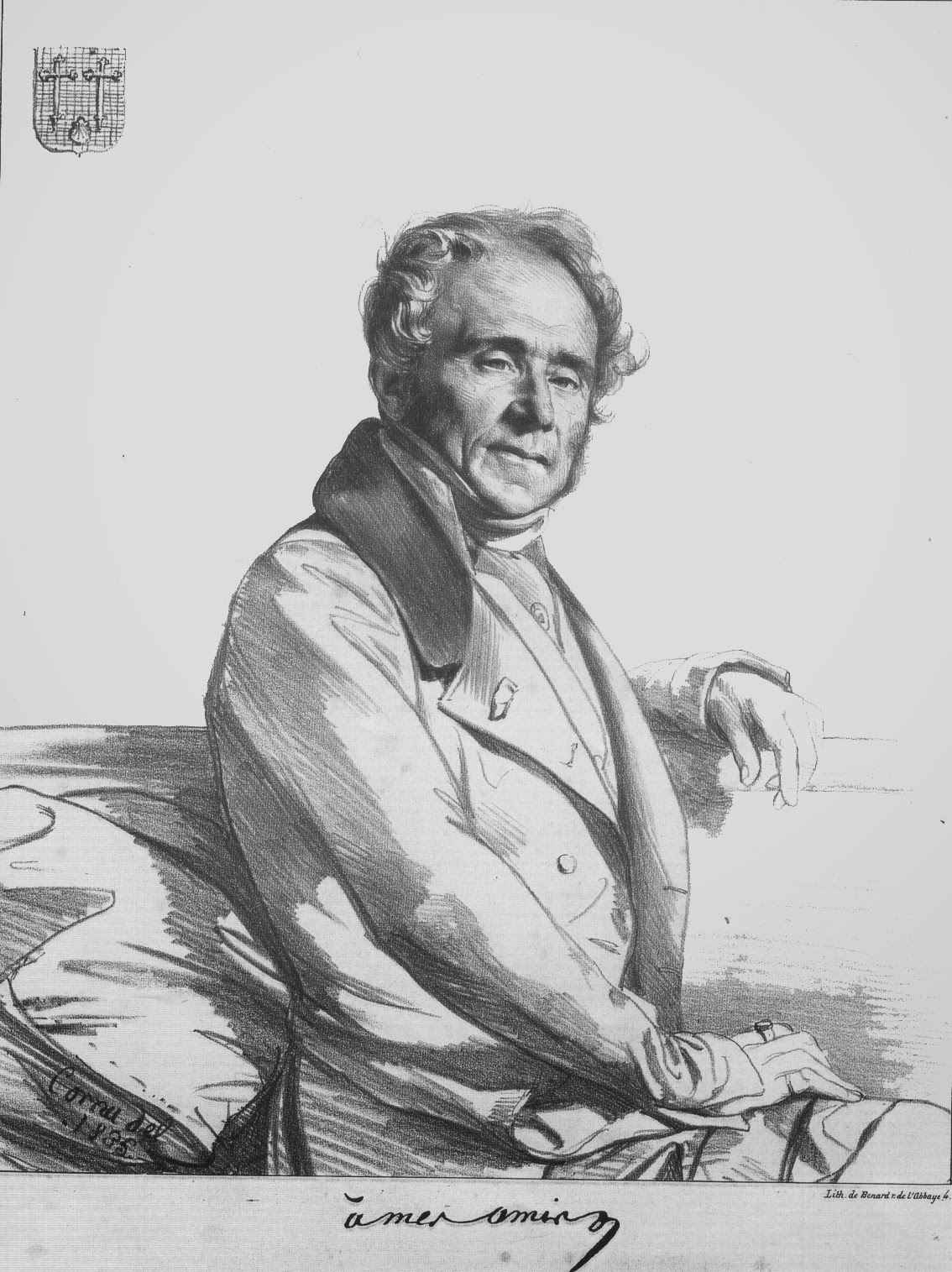
Narcisse de Becdelièvre

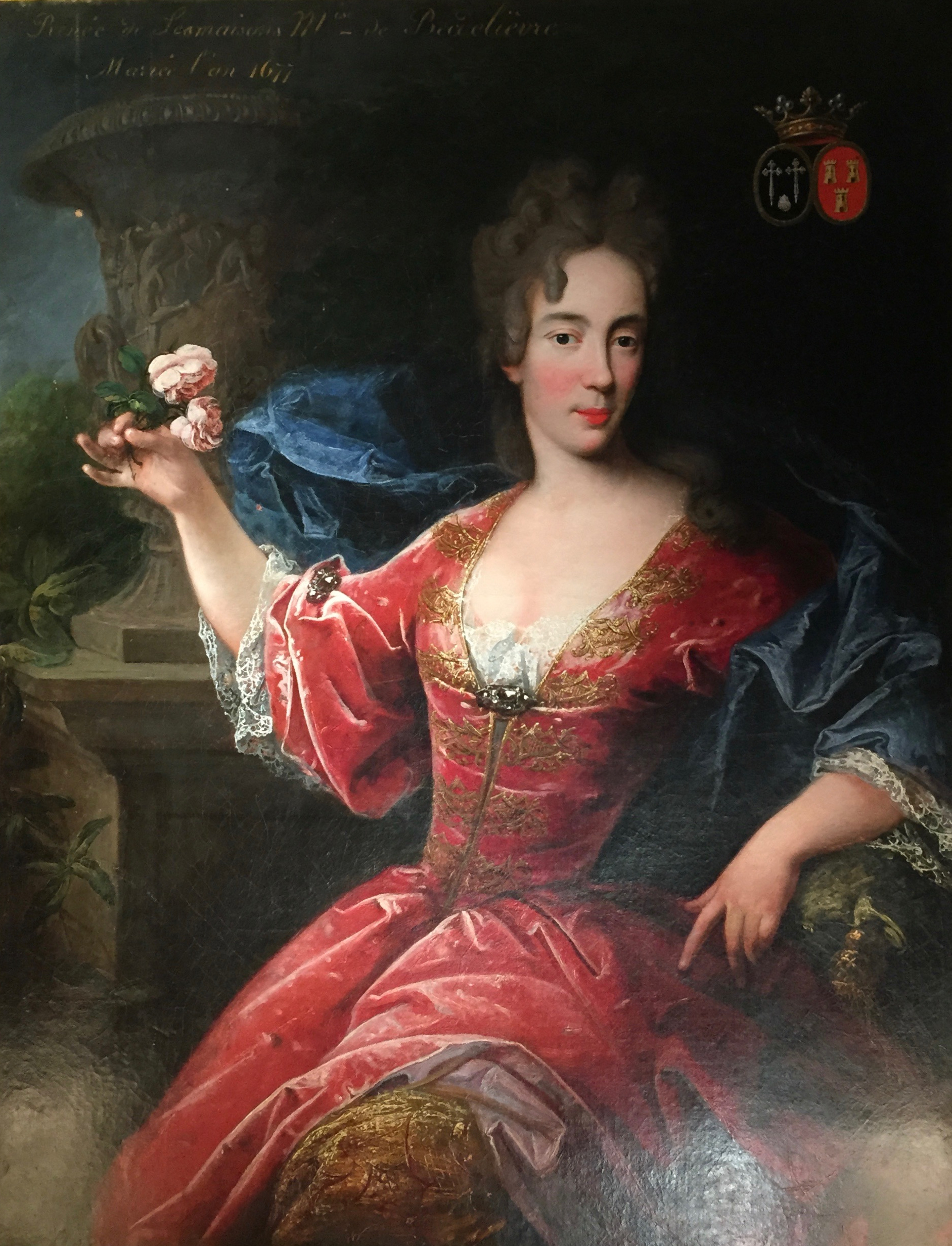
Renée de Sesmaisons, Marquise de Becdelièvre, by Pierre Mignard

== Alliances ==
Key alliances include: de Goulaine, Harouys, Cornulier, de Charette, Blanchard, de Sesmaisons, du Plessis-Mauron, de Derval, de Bourgneuf de Cucé, Le Nobletz, and others such as de Lorgeril, de Roquefeuil, and de Montmorency (1797).

== See also ==
- Nobility of France
- Duchy of Brittany
- Parlement of Brittany
- Honneurs de la Cour
- Knights Hospitaller
- Roman Catholic Diocese of Nîmes

== Bibliography ==
- Chaix d'Est-Ange, Gustave (1904). Dictionnaire des familles françaises anciennes ou notables à la fin du XIXe siècle [Dictionary of Ancient or Notable French Families at the End of the 19th Century] (in French). Vol. III. Bas-Ber. Évreux: Imprimerie Charles Hérissey.
