= Robert Tournières =

French painter

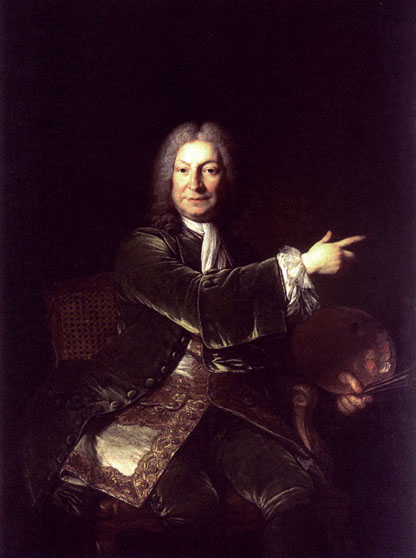
- Portrait of Tournières by Pierre Lesueur, 1747
- Born: Robert Le Vrac de Tournières; 1667; Ifs, near Caen, Province of Normandy
- Died: 1752 (aged 84–85); Caen
- Known for: Painting

Signature
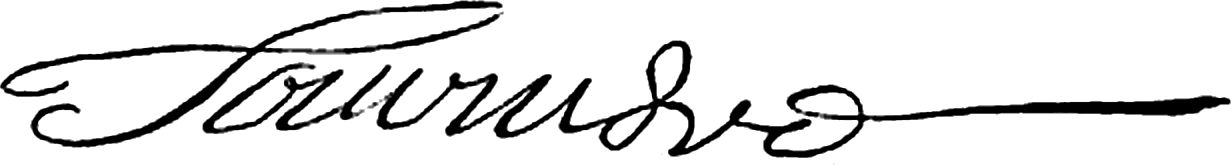

Robert Le Vrac de Tournières (17 June 1667 – 18 May 1752) was a French painter. After the Second World War, a street in the new Saint-Paul district of his home city of Caen was named rue Robert Tournières.

== Life ==
Studying under Lucas Delahaye, then under Bon Boullogne and Rigaud, Tournières was notable for being received twice into the Académie royale de peinture – first in 1702 as a portrait painter, with his portraits of the painters Pierre Mosnier and Michel Corneille; and then on 24 October 1716, as a history painter, with his Invention of drawing (1716), showing a pair of lovers lit by a single candle. Promoted to professeur auxiliaire in 1737, he exhibited successfully at the 1742 salon.

His œuvre's heterogenous nature is typical of an artist of the transitional period of the French Regency – the Dutch elements give his work a new and more intimate character, while the lightness of his palette prefigures the rococo style. He produced large-scale paintings of which all trace is lost and small paintings in which he distinguished himself were preoccupied with Godfried Schalken and Gerard Dou, of whom he had made a special study. These are now dispersed, if not entirely lost.

With a talent for painting and portraying faces, Tournières enjoyed a great reputation during his lifetime. He left a considerable number of portraits which are mostly in notable collections. He showed a delicate colouring, a perfect talent for pose and positioning, a certain elegance in drapery. He was, according to an eminent critic, an artist who was more careful than powerful and, unable to be accounted as being in the first rank of portraitists, he still won an honourable place among them.

Returning to Caen in 1749, he stopped painting. His father, an engraver by trade, had married a widow who had a son, who was François Lemoyne.

== Works ==
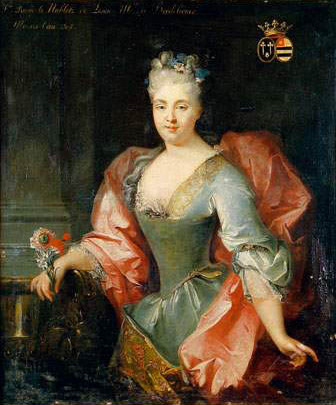
Renée Françoise Le Nobletz de Lescus, marquise de Becdelièvre – Private collection

The Regent and the countess de Parabère (canvas 96x130cm) - National Museum of Serbia, Belgrade

- Allegory of autumn, Rouen, musée des beaux-arts
- Allegory of summer, Rouen, musée des beaux-arts
- Boar head with dogs, Fontainebleau, musée national du château
- Colbert de Torcy (1665–1746), Versailles, musée national du château et des Trianons
- Dibutade drawing the portrait of her lover by lamplight, or the Invention of Drawing, Paris; École nationale supérieure des Beaux-Arts
- Family in a landscape, Nantes, musée des beaux-arts
- The Ham Lunch, Versailles, musée Lambinet
- The Sculptor Brodon, Caen, musée des beaux-arts
- Louis Phelypeaux, comte de Pontchartrain, chancelier de France (1643–1727), Versailles, musée national du château et des Trianons
- Michel Corneille the elder (1642–1708), Versailles, musée national du château et des Trianons
- Moses saved from the river, Caen, musée des beaux-arts
- Pierre Mosnier or Monnier (1641–1703), Versailles, musée national du château et des Trianons
- Portrait of an old man, Paris, musée du Louvre département des Peintures
- Portrait of a rector of a university, disappeared
- Portrait of a family in a landscape, Nantes, musée des beaux-arts
- Portrait of Charles de la Boische, marquis de Beauharnais, governor of Canada; Portrait of a man decorated with a cordon rouge (old title), Grenoble, Museum of Grenoble
- Portrait of a family in a salon, Nantes, musée des beaux-arts
- Portrait of a woman with her left hand on a chest, Rouen, musée des beaux-arts
- Portrait of the goldsmith Nicolas de Launay and his family, Caen, musée des beaux-arts
- Portrait of the Maupertuis family, Nantes, musée des beaux-arts
- Portrait of Louis Henri de Bourbon, prince de Condé (1621–1686), sometimes called the maréchal de Berwick, Musée des Beaux-Arts de Rennes
- Portrait of Pontchartrain, Rennes, musée des beaux-arts
- Portrait of Voltaire, Rouen, musée des beaux-arts
- Portrait of the chancellor d’Aguesseau, Rouen, musée des beaux-arts
- Portrait of chancellor Louis Phélypeaux, comte de Pontchartrain, Dijon, musée des beaux-arts
- Portrait of the engraver Audran, Caen, musée des beaux-arts
- 3/4 length portrait of chancellor of Aguesseau, Rouen, musée des beaux-arts
- Presumed portrait of Maria Sybilla Merian, Caen, musée des beaux-arts
- The Regent and the comtesse de Parabère, National Museum of Serbia, Belgrade (pictured right)
- Supposed portrait of monsieur de Saint-Cannat and his children, Musée des beaux-arts de Marseille

== Sources ==
- Merson, Olivier. La Peinture française au XVIIe et au XVIIIe (in French). Paris: Alcide Picard & Kaan. pp. 218–20.
- Pinset, Raphael (1884). Histoire du portrait en France (in French). Paris: A. Qantin. p. 149.
