= Harriet von Rathlef =

German sculptor and writer

Harriet Ellen Siderowna von Rathlef-Keilmann
- Harriet Keilmann at the age of 18 in Riga
- Born: Harriet Keilmann; 3 January 1887; Riga, Russian Empire (now Latvia)
- Died: 1 May 1933 (aged 46); Berlin, Nazi Germany
- Known for: Sculpture, Writing
- Spouse: Harald von Rathlef (m. 1908–1922)

Harriet Ellen Siderowna von Rathlef-Keilmann (3 January 1887 – 1 May 1933), was a German sculptor and writer of children's books.

== Life and work ==
She was born to a prominent Jewish family in Riga, Livonia, a province of the Russian Empire. She married Harald von Rathlef, a lieutenant in the Czarist Regiment of the Alexander Hussars, in 1908 in Riga. The couple had four children. The family fled to Germany on 28 December 1918 in an effort to escape from revolutionary Russia. The family settled near Weimar, where she studied under Walter Gropius at the Bauhaus until 1921. She divorced her husband in 1922 and supported her children with the income from her sculptures, graphics and illustrations.

In 1925 she became a major proponent of Anna Anderson's claim to be Grand Duchess Anastasia Nikolaevna of Russia. She befriended the claimant and wrote a series of articles about her. In the same year she converted to Roman Catholicism.

She was involved in artistic circles and social causes in Berlin, but was forced to resign from the Society of Berlin Women Artists when Adolf Hitler rose to power. Alarmed by the political developments in Nazi Germany, she hoped to leave the country. Before she could make definite plans, she died in Berlin on 1 May 1933 of a burst appendix.

In Falk Harnack's 1956 film, The Story of Anastasia, she was portrayed by German actress Käthe Braun.
