= Nude (Renoir, Belgrade, 1910) =

Painting by Pierre-Auguste Renoir

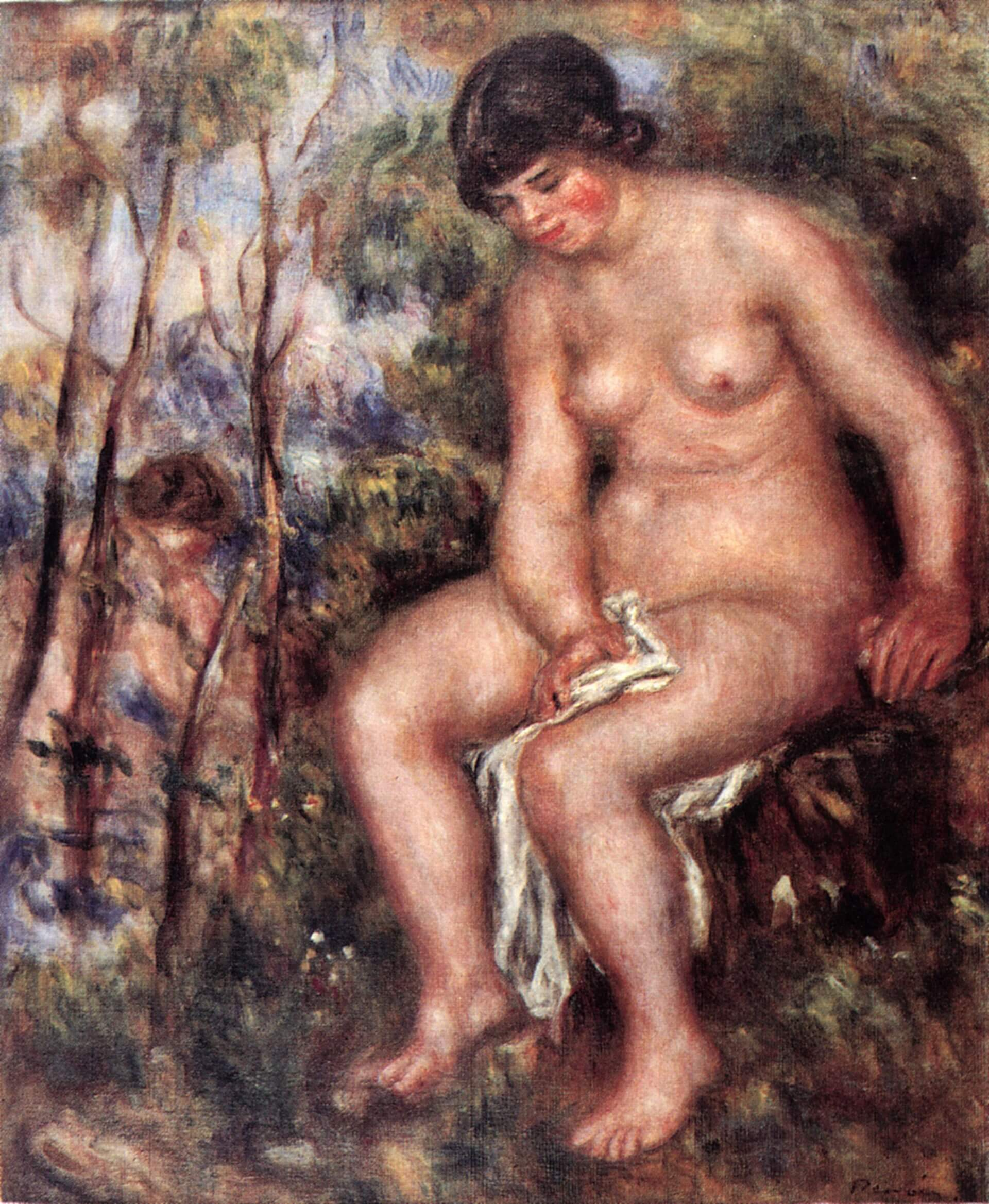
- Artist: Pierre-Auguste Renoir
- Year: 1910
- Medium: Oil on canvas
- Dimensions: 129.5 cm × 172.7 cm (51 in × 68 in)
- Location: National Museum of Serbia; Belgrade

Nude (1910, French: Nu, Serbian: Купачица / Kupačica) is a painting by French impressionist Pierre-Auguste Renoir representing his late work period (1892–1919). It is oil on canvas, and was painted in 1910. The painting is now in the National Museum of Serbia in Belgrade. The painting was given to the Serbian people by Prince Paul of Yugoslavia.

== History ==
The painting was purchased in Paris in 1935 by Milan Kašanin, contemporary director of the National Museum. It was paid for by joint contributions from the Museum, the Ministry of Culture and private donations. It was stolen in 1996 by an amateur thief. During the theft it was badly damaged and was recovered in poor condition, requiring a year of restoration. After the Renoir was stolen, the entire foreign art collection was moved to the museum warehouse to protect the collection until a better security system could be installed.

== See also ==
- List of paintings by Pierre-Auguste Renoir
