= Léon-Victor Dupré =

French landscape painter

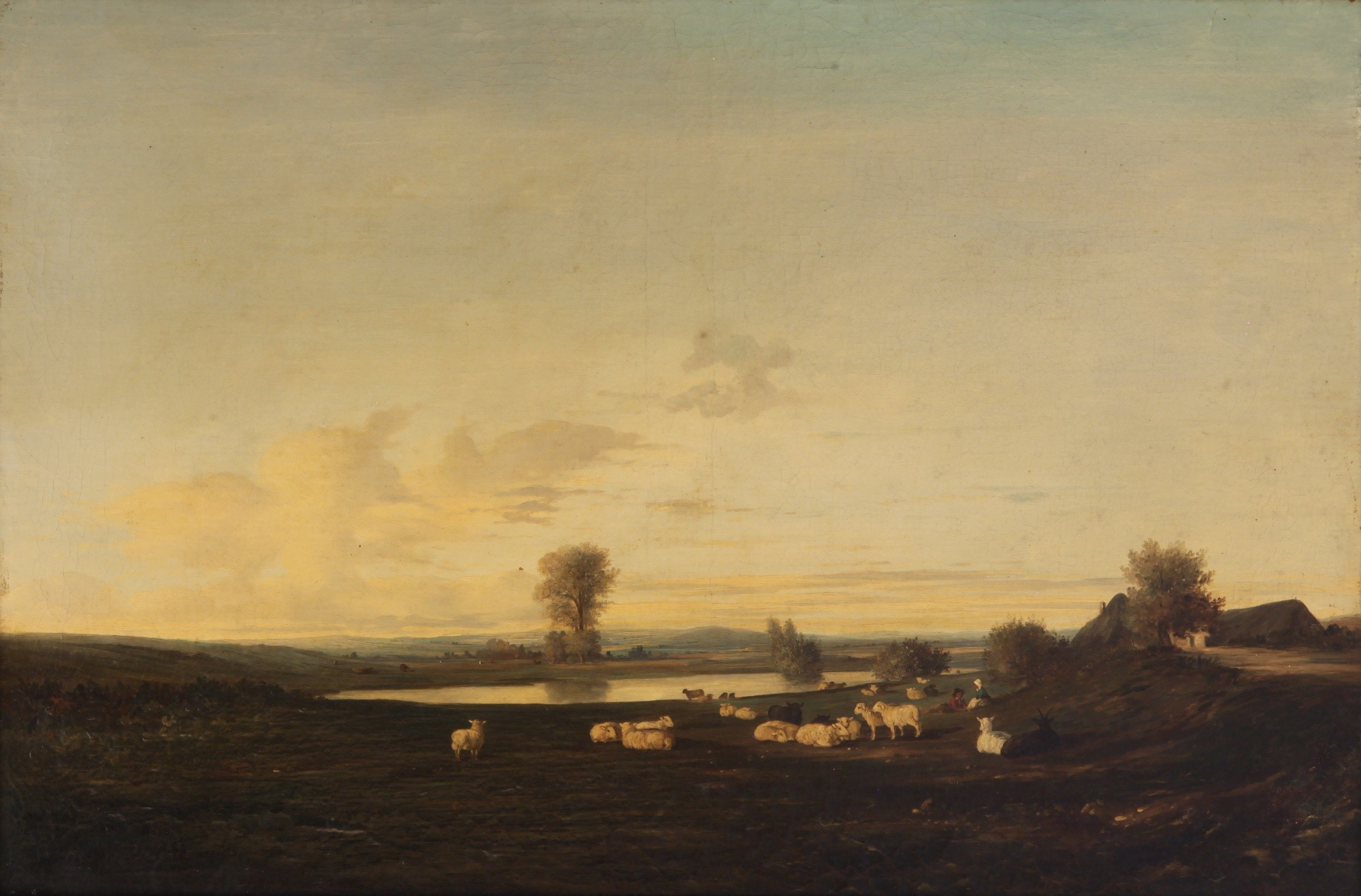
Landscape with figures and animals by Léon-Victor Dupré

Léon-Victor Dupré (1816-1879) was a French landscape painter.

He was born at Limoges in 1816, and studied under his brother, Jules Dupré. He died in 1879, after a long and painful illness. Amongst his works are:

- "Meadows in Berry".
- "Environs of St. Julien".
- "Cows Drinking " - 1855. (South Kensington Museum.)
- "View at Argentan" - 1861.
- "Landscape in the Indre" - 1864.
