= Patrick (given name) =

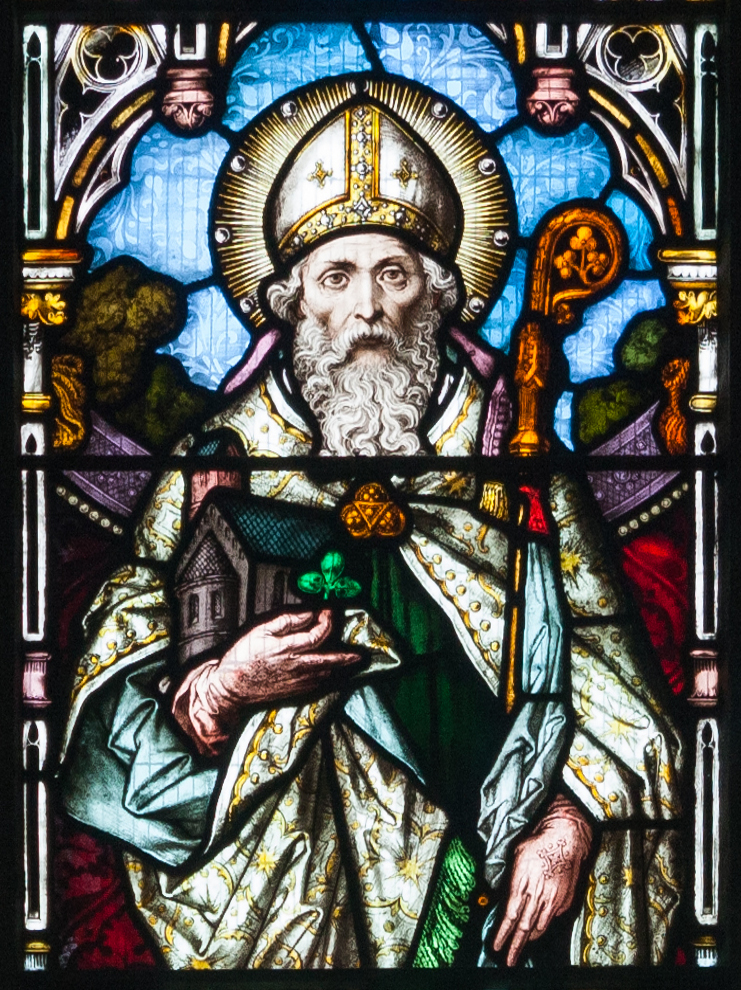
- Stained glass window of Saint Patrick
- Pronunciation: /ˈpætrɪk/ German: [patʁɪk]
- Gender: Male
- Name day: March 17

Origin
- Language: Latin
- Meaning: "Nobleman", "patrician"

Other names
- Nicknames: Pat, Paddy, Patty, Rick, Ricky
- Related names: Patricia, Pádraic, Pádraig, Pádraigín, Patrice, Patricio, Patrizio, Patryk

Patrick is a male given name of Latin origin. It is derived from the Roman name Patricius (meaning patrician, i.e. 'father', 'nobleman').

== People named Patrick ==
=== Actors and entertainers ===
- Patrick J. Adams (born 1981), Canadian actor
- Patrick Armand, French ballet dancer
- Pat Boone (born 1934), American singer
- Patrick Brasca, Canadian–Taiwanese singer
- Patrick Cargill, British actor
- Pat Condell, English stand-up comedian
- Patrick Condren (born 1967), Irish actor
- Pat Corley, American actor
- Patrick Dempsey (born 1966), American actor
- Patrick Duffy, American actor
- Patrick Ellis (radio host) (1943–2020), American radio show host
- Patrick Nattawat Finkler (born 2003), Thai–German actor, singer, dancer, songwriter and model
- Pat Finn (1965–2025), American actor
- Patrick Fugit (born 1982), American actor
- Patrick Garcia (born 1981), Filipino actor
- Patrick Gower, New Zealand journalist
- Patrick Heusinger (born 1981), American actor
- Patrick Macnee, English actor
- Patrick Magee, Irish actor
- Patrick McDonnell, Irish actor
- Patrick McGoohan (1928–2009), Irish-American actor
- Patrick Monahan, Irish comedian
- Patrick O'Connell, Irish actor
- Pat Paulsen (1927–1997), American comedian and satirist
- Patrick Poivey (1948–2020), French voice of Bruce Willis.
- Pat Sajak, American game show host
- Patrick Stewart (1940–2026), English actor
- Patrick Swayze (1952–2009), American actor
- Patrick Tam (actor) (born 1969), Hong Kong actor and singer
- Patrick Tang (born 1974), Hong Kong singer, actor, and television host
- Patrick Topaloff (1944–2010), French singer and actor
- Patrick Troughton (1920–1987), English actor
- Patrick Tse (born 1936), Hong Kong actor, producer, screenwriter and director
- Patrick Warburton (born 1964), American actor
- Patrick Waltz (1924–1972), American actor
- Patrick Wilson (born 1973), American actor and singer

Other

- Sean Patrick Flanery, American actor
- Sean Patrick Thomas, American actor
- Neil Patrick Harris, American actor

=== Authors ===
- Patrick, the pseudonym used by artist John Byrne (born 1940), Scottish playwright
- Patrick Cary (c. 1624–1658), English poet
- Pat Chapman (food writer), English food writer
- Padraic Colum (1881–1972), Irish author
- Patrick Cullinan (1932–2011), South African poet and biographer
- Patrick Delaforce, historian and British Army captain
- Patrick Jennings (born 1962), American children's book author
- Patrick Jones (born 1965), Welsh poet and playwright
- Patrick Lane (1939–2019), Canadian poet
- Patrick Modiano (born 1945), French novelist
- Patrick Pearse (1879–1916), Irish poet and nationalist
- Patrick O'Brian (1914–2000), English author and translator
- Patrick Süskind (born 1949), German writer and screenwriter
- Patrick Woodcock (born 1968), Canadian writer and poet

=== Musicians ===
- Patrick Alavi, German musician
- Pat Boone (born 1934), American singer
- Patrick Brasca, Canadian-Taiwanese singer
- Patrick Bruel, French singer
- Patrick Carney (born 1980), American drummer, member of indie rock band The Black Keys
- Pat DiNizio (1955–2017), American songwriter, lead singer of the band The Smithereens
- Patrick Doyle, Scottish film composer
- Patrick Girondi, singer, composer
- Patrick Hernandez, French singer
- Patrick Lindner, German singer
- Pat Metheny, American jazz guitarist
- Steven Patrick Morrissey (born 1959), British singer
- Patrick Monahan (born 1969), American musician (rock band Train)
- Patrick "Pat" O'Brien, former lead guitarist for the death metal band Cannibal Corpse, former member for the heavy metal band Nevermore and a former touring musician with the thrash metal band Slayer
- Patrick Chukwuemeka Okogwu, known as Tinie Tempah, British rapper
- Patrick Simmons (born 1948), American guitarist and singer, founding member of the band The Doobie Brothers
- Patrick Stump (born 1984), American musician, lead singer and rhythm guitarist of the band Fall Out Boy
- Patrick Walden (1978–2025), English rock guitarist
- Patrick Wilson (born 1969), American musician, drummer of the band Weezer
- Patrick Wolf (born 1983), English singer-songwriter

=== Politicians ===
- Patrick Dankwa Anin (1928–1999), Ghanaian politician
- Pat Bell (born 1957), Canadian politician)
- Patrik Björck (born 1957), Swedish politician
- Patrick Biggins, American politician
- Patrick Blake (1846–1909), Canadian politician
- Patrick Boland, Irish politician
- Patrick Bonin, Canadian politician
- Patrick Buchanan, American political commentator, author and politician
- Patrick Byrne, Irish politician
- Patrick Connor, Irish politician
- Patrick Donnelly, Irish politician
- Patrick Duffy, Irish politician
- Patrick Duncan, South African politician
- Patrik Engström (born 1968), Swedish politician
- Patrick F. Gill, American Representative
- Patrick Henry (1736–1799), American revolutionary figure
- Patrick Hetzel (born 1964), French Member of Parliament
- Patrick Hillery (1923–2008), the sixth President of Ireland (1976–1990)
- Patrick Home (1728–1808), Scottish MP for Berwickshire (1784–1796)
- Patrik Karlson (born 1987), Swedish politician
- Patrick J. Kennedy, former United States congressman
- Patrick Leonard, Irish politician
- Patrick Leahy (born 1940), American politician and attorney
- Patrik Lundqvist (born 1984), Swedish politician
- Patrick Matibini (born 1959), Zambian politician and judge / current speaker of the national assembly 'parliament'
- Patrick Murphy, Irish politician
- Patrick Norton, Irish politician
- Patrick Palmer, Irish politician
- Patrick Pearse (aka Pádraig Pearse) (1879–1916), Irish activist and revolutionary
- Pat Roberts, American Senator from Kansas
- Pat Robertson, American preacher and political figure
- Patrick Lipton Robinson, Jamaican U.N. judge
- Patrick Tierney, Irish politician
- Patrick Vahoe (born 1970), Solomon Islands politician
- Patrick Vans, Scottish judge
- Patrick Vanse (1655–1733), Scottish MP
- Patrick Waldraff (born 1987), German politician
- Patrick Wroblewski, American politician
- Levy Patrick Mwanawasa (1948–2008), Former President of the Republic of Zambia

=== Religious figures ===
- Saint Patrick, Christian saint
- Patrick Duggan (bishop), Roman Catholic Bishop of Clonfert in Ireland
- Patrick Kearon (born 1961), British religious leader

=== Sportspeople ===
- Patrick, the working name of professional wrestler Don Harris
- Patrik Andersson, Swedish football player
- Patrick Bailey (born 1999), American baseball player
- Patrick Baldassarre (born 1986), Swiss basketball player
- Patrick Bamford, English football player
- Pat Barry (born 1979), American kickboxer and mixed martial artist
- Pat Bastien (born 1991), American football player or coach
- Pat Batteaux (born 1978), American football player
- Patrick Battiston (born 1957), French footballer
- Patrik Berger, Czech football player
- Patrik Berglund, Swedish ice hockey player
- Patrick Beverley (born 1968), American basketball player
- Pat Boller (born 1972), American ice hockey coach and executive
- Paddy Bradley, Irish Gaelic football player
- Pat Bryant (born 2002), American football player
- Patrick Burris, American judoka and two-time Olympian
- Patrick Cain, American football player
- Pat Calathes (born 1985), Greek-American basketball player
- Pat Cash, Australian tennis player
- Patrick Chan (born 1990), Canadian figure skater
- Patrick Chung, American football player
- Pat Coogan (born 2002), American football player
- Pat Connaughton (born 1993), American basketball player
- Pat Corr (1927–2017), Northern Irish footballer
- Pat Cummins, Australian cricketer
- Patrick Dangerfield, Australian football player
- Patrik Divkovič (born 1999), Slovenian taekwondo practitioner
- Patrick Dorgu (born 2004), Danish football player
- Patrick Eaves, American-Canadian ice hockey player
- Pat Elflein, American football player
- Patrik Eliáš (born 1976), Czech ice hockey player
- Pat Elzie, American-German basketball coach and former player
- Patrick Ewing, American basketball player
- Patrick Faber (field hockey), Dutch field hockey player
- Patrick Feeney (born 1991), American sprinter
- Patrick Fernandes (born 1993), Cape Verdean footballer
- Pat Freiermuth (born 1998), American football player
- Patrick Gouge (born 2003), Jersey cricketer
- Patrik Gunnarsson (born 2000), Icelandic footballer
- Pádraig Harrington, Irish professional golfer
- Patrick Heuscher, Swiss volleyball player
- Patric Hörnqvist, Swedish ice hockey player
- Patrik Jahoda (born 1993), Czech para-cyclist
- Patrekur Jóhannesson, Icelandic handball coach
- Patrick Kane, professional ice hockey player
- Patrick Kluivert, Dutch football player and coach
- Patrick Kühl, German swimmer
- Patrik Kühnen, German tennis player
- Patrick Kutas (born 2004), American football player
- Patrik Laine, Finnish ice hockey player
- Patrick Laird (born 1995), American football player
- Patrick Lam (born 1983), Hong Kong equestrian
- Patrick Larkins (1860–1918), American baseball player
- Patrick Lewis, American football player
- Pat Mahomes, American baseball player; father of Patrick Mahomes II
- Patrick Mahomes II, American football player
- Patrick Matt, Liechtensteiner cyclist
- Pat Matzdorf, American athlete
- Patrick Mazeika (born 1993), American baseball player
- Patrick Mboma (born 1970), Cameroonian football player
- Pat McAfee (born 1987), American football player
- Patrick McEnroe, American tennis player
- Patrick McGuirk (born 1967), American football player
- Patrick McMorris (born 2001), American football player
- Patrick Mekari (born 1997), American football player
- Patrick Miller (basketball) (born 1992), American basketball player
- Patty Mills, Australian basketball player←
- Pat Mintey (1947–2021), American racing driver
- Patrick Monteverde (born 1997), American baseball player
- Patrick Morris (American football) (born 1995), American football player
- Pat Mountain (footballer), Welsh football player
- Patrick O'Connell (1887–1959), Irish footballer
- Pat O'Connor (disambiguation), multiple people
- Pat O'Hanlon (born 1991), Australia Rugby League player
- Patrick Overmyer (born 2005), American football player
- Patrick Owomoyela (born 1979), German footballer
- Pat Pacillo (born 1963), American baseball player
- Patrick Payton (born 2002), American football player
- Patrick Pedersen (born 1991), Danish footballer
- Patrick Peterson (born 1990), American football player
- Patrick Queen (born 1999), American football player
- Patrick Rafter, Australian tennis player
- Patrick Rakovsky, German football player
- Patrick Ramsey, American football player
- Patrick Reilly (baseball) (born 2001), American baseball player
- Patrick Ricard (American football) (born 1994), American football player
- Pat Richards (born 1981), Australian Rugby League player
- Pat Riley (born 1945), American basketball player, coach and executive
- Patrick Rowe (born 1969), American football player
- Patrick Roy, Canadian ice hockey player and coach
- Pat Ryan (born 1955), American football player
- Patrick Sammon (born 2003), American swimmer
- Patrick Sandoval, American baseball player
- Patrick Scales (American football), American football player
- Patrik Schick, Czech football player
- Patrick Schmollinger, Austrian swimmer
- Patrick Sharp (born 1981), Canadian ice hockey player
- Patrick da Silva, Brazilian football player
- Patrik Sjöberg, Swedish high jumper
- Pat Spillane, Irish Gaelic footballer
- Patrick Surtain (born 1976), American football player
- Patrick Surtain II (born 2000), American football player
- Pat Tillman (born 1976), American football player and Army Ranger
- Patrick Vahe (born 1996), American football player
- Patrick Veszpremi, Australian rules footballer
- Patrick Vieira, Senegalese-born French football player
- Patrik Virta (born 1996), Finnish ice hockey player
- Patrick Vörös (born 1993), Canadian professional wrestler
- Patrick Weigel (born 1994), American baseball player
- Patrick "P. J." Williams (born 2001), American football player
- Patrick Willis (born 1985), American football player

=== Other ===
- Patrick Abercrombie, English town planner
- Patrick Ali Pahlavi, prince of the Pahlavi dynasty of Iran
- Patrick Bokanowski, a French filmmaker
- Patrick Tracy Burris (1967–2009), American spree killer
- Patrick Anthony Charles Campbell (born 1935), English academic and journalist
- Patrick Carr (disambiguation), multiple people
- Patrick Critton, American aircraft hijacker
- Patrick E. Crago, American medical researcher
- Patrick Wood Crusius (born 1998), perpetrator of the 2019 El Paso Walmart shooting
- Patrick Degorce (born 1969), French hedge fund manager
- Patrick J. Denard (fl. 2000s–2020s), American orthopedic surgeon and researcher
- Patrick Dumont, American businessman
- Pat Finucane (1949–1989), Irish lawyer
- Patrick Fitzgerald, American attorney
- Patrick Flanagan, American inventor
- Patrick Gaffney (disambiguation), multiple people
- Patrik Gardesten, Swedish officer
- Patrick de Gayardon (1960–1998), French skydiver, skysurfer and BASE jumper
- Patrick Gordon, Imperial Russian Army general
- Patrick Graham (disambiguation), multiple people
- Patrick Harvey (disambiguation), multiple people
- Patrick Hemingway, son of author Ernest Hemingway
- Patrick Hitler, half-nephew of Adolf Hitler
- Patrick Jeffrey, American diver
- Patrick Kearney (born 1939), American serial killer
- Pat Kenny, Irish broadcaster
- Patrick Kielty, Irish comedian
- Pat Kiernan, Canadian-American TV anchor
- Patrick Kong, Hong Kong film director
- Patrick Lee (Chinese businessman)
- Patrick Anson, 5th Earl of Lichfield (1939–2005; aka Patrick Lichfield), English photographer
- Patrick Lin (chef), Hong Kong chef
- Patrick Lin (cinematographer), Hong Kong cinematographer
- Patrick Lung (1934–2014), Hong Kong film director
- Patrick Lynch (disambiguation), multiple people
- Patrick Mackay (born 1952), British serial killer
- Patrick McGuinness (disambiguation), multiple people
- Patrick Ferguson Millard (1902–1972), English painter
- Sir Patrick Moore, English astronomer
- Patrick Moore (born 1947), former Greenpeace president
- Patrick Nogueira, Brazilian murderer
- Pat O'Brien, American radio and TV personality
- Patrik Reuterswärd (1885–1963), Swedish diplomat
- Patrick Russell (disambiguation), multiple people
- Patrick Rechner, Canadian hostage taker in Bosnia
- Patrick W. Skehan (1909–1980), American Old Testament semitic scholar
- Patrick "Spaz" Spaziante, American comic book artist
- Patrick Swift (1927–1983), Irish painter
- Patrick Tam (film director) (born 1948), Hong Kong
- Patrick Taylor (disambiguation), multiple people
- Patrick Theodore, Australian footballer
- Patrick Warren (born 1985), English missing person
- Patrick Whelan (1893–1916), Irish Volunteer, killed in 1916
- Patrick Williams (disambiguation), multiple people
- Patrick Yau, Hong Kong film director

== Fictional characters ==
- Patrick Bateman, in Bret Easton Ellis' novel American Psycho
- Patrick Clifton, titular character in Postman Pat
- Patrick Darling, in Dirty Sexy Money
- Sir Patrick Delaney-Podmore, in the Harry Potter series of books
- Patrick Harper (fiction), the Irish right-hand man in the Sharpe book and television series
- Patrick Jane, main character in The Mentalist
- Patrick Star, in the television series SpongeBob SquarePants
- Patrick Zweig, main character in Challengers

== See also ==
- Patrick (disambiguation)
- Patrick (surname)
- Pádraigín, Irish given name
