= Patrice =

- Pronunciation: English: /pəˈtriːs/ French: [patʁis]
- Gender: Unisex
- Languages: English, French
- Name day: March 17 (France)

Origin
- Languages: Latin, French, English
- Origin: patricius
- Derivation: pater + -icius
- Meaning: "noble"; "father" + "-itious"
- Region of origin: France and England

Other names
- Alternative spelling: Patrece
- Cognates: Pádraig; Patricia; Patricio; Patrick; Patrizio; Patryk

Patrice is an English- and French-language given name of Latin origin, unisex in English but masculine in French. It is derived from the Latin term patricius, meaning "noble", and thus cognate with the more common names Patricia and Patrick.

== Popularity ==
In the United States, the popularity of the name Patrice peaked in 1958, when it ranked as the 212th most popular name. Its usage fluctuated in the following decades but has generally declined since 1987. The name last appeared in the top 1000 names of babies born in the United States in 1995, ranking at No. 941.

== Notable men ==
- Patrice Bart-Williams, known by the mononym "Patrice", German reggae musician
- Patrice Bergeron, Canadian ice hockey player
- Patrice Bianchi, French alpine skier
- Patrice Brisebois, Canadian ice hockey player
- Patrice Motsepe, South African businessman
- Patrice Coirault, French ethnomusicologist
- Patrice Evra, French footballer
- Patrice Guers, French bassist, known for his work in Rhapsody of Fire
- Patrice Laliberté, Canadian film and television director and screenwriter
- Patrice Laplante, Canadian politician
- Patrece Liburd, Kittitian footballer
- Patrice Loko, French footballer
- Patrice Lumumba, first prime minister of the Democratic Republic of Congo
- Patrice de MacMahon, duc de Magenta, former president of the French Republic
- Patrice O'Neal, American stand-up comedian
- Patrice-Edouard Ngaïssona, former minister of sports in the Central African Republic, president of the Central African Football Federation, leader of Anti-balaka and war criminal
- Patrice Pastor, Monegasque businessman
- Patrice Talon, Beninese businessman and president (since 2016)
- Patrice Wilson, Nigerian songwriter and producer behind ARK Music Factory

== Notable women ==
- Patrice Baldwin, British drama and theatre educator
- Patrece Charles-Freeman, Jamaican politician
- Patrice Donnelly, American hurdler
- Patrice Hollis, Playboy Playmate September 2007
- Patrice Holloway, American soul and pop singer
- Patrice Martinez, American actress
- Patrice Munsel, American coloratura soprano
- Patrice Pike, American singer-songwriter
- Patrice Roberts, Trinidadian sìnger
- Patrice Rushen, American R&B singer-songwriter
- Patrice Wymore, American film and television actress; widow of Errol Flynn

== Fictional characters ==
- Patrice, in the 2001 film Baby Boy
- Patrice, a secondary character in season 8 of the sitcom How I Met Your Mother
- Patrice, a mother in Julie Anne Peters' books Luna and Define Normal
- Patrice, a mercenary in the 2012 James Bond film Skyfall
- Patrice de Broglie, volcanologist in Anne McCaffrey's book Dragonsdawn
- Patrice Dellaplane in 1988 film Action Jackson
- Patrice Johnson in 1988 musical film Dance 'til Dawn
- Patrice McDowell in 1988 film Coming To America
