= Patti (given name) =

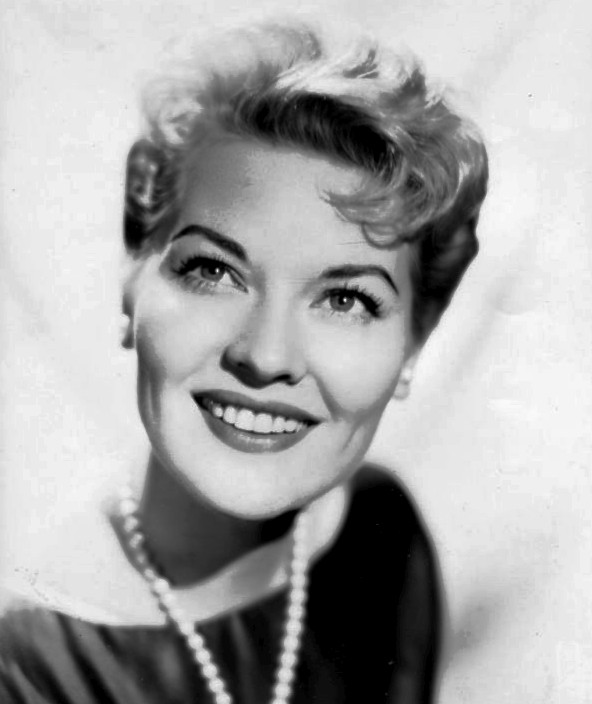
- American singer Patti Page.
- Gender: Primarily female

Origin
- Origin: English
- Meaning: diminutive of Martha, Patricia, or Patrick

Other names
- Related names: Mattie, Paddy, Patsy, Pattie, Patty

Patti is a feminine given name related to Pattie and Patty.

Patti is generally derived from a short form or diminutive of Patricia, derived from the Latin word patrician, referring to the nobility. Usually spelled Patty, the name was also used as a short form of names such as Martha in the 18th century.

- Patti Austin (born 1950), American R&B, pop and jazz singer
- Patti Catalano (born 1953), American long-distance runner
- Patti Davis (born 1952), American actress and author
- Patti Deutsch (1943–2017), American voice artist and comedic actress
- Patti Drew (1944–2025), American pop singer
- Patti Flynn (1937–2020), jazz singer, author, radio actress, model and social activist
- Patti Harrison (born 1990), American actress and comedian
- Patti Karr (1932–2020), American actress, dancer, and singer
- Patti LaBelle (born 1944), American singer, author, actress, and entrepreneur
- Patti Lewis, American politician
- Patti LuPone (born 1949), American actress and singer
- Patti Mayor (born Martha Ann Mayor; 1872–1962), English artist
- Patti Miller (born 1954), Australian writer
- Patti Murin (born 1980), American theatre actress
- Patti Page (1927–2013), American singer of traditional pop music
- Patti Russo (born 1964), American singer, songwriter, and actress
- Patti Scialfa (born 1953), American singer-songwriter and guitarist
- Patti Smith (born 1946), American singer-songwriter, poet, and visual artist
- Patti Smith (politician) (1946–2017), American politician in Oregon
- Patti Grace Smith (1947–2016), United States Federal Aviation Administration (FAA) official
- Patti Stanger (born 1961), American businesswoman and reality television personality
- Patti Starr (born c. 1943), Canadian administrator and novelist
- Patti Yasutake, American film and television actress
- Patti Mayonaise, a fictional character on the animated series Doug

== See also ==
- Pattie (disambiguation), includes list of people with the name
- Patty (given name)
- Patty (surname)
- Patti (disambiguation)
- Piatti (disambiguation)
- Patti (surname)
