= Padehay =

Padehay or Padehi (Persian: پده اي) may refer to:

- Padehi, Sistan and Baluchestan
- Padehay, South Khorasan

== See also ==
- Pedehi, Sistan and Baluchestan Province
