= Piatti =

Piatti may refer to:

- Piatti (surname), a surname
- Piatti scooter, a motor scooter of the 1950s
- The Italian term for cymbals

== See also ==
- Pattie (disambiguation)
- Patty (disambiguation)
- Patti (disambiguation)
