= Pat Doherty =

Pat Doherty, short for Patrick Doherty or Patricia Doherty, may refer to:

- Pat Doherty (boxer) (born 1962), English boxer
- Pat Doherty (Canadian politician) (1914–1973), Canadian politician
- Pat Doherty (netball) (born 1933), former Australia netball international
- Pat Doherty (Northern Ireland politician) (born 1945), Northern Ireland politician

== See also ==
- Patrick Doherty (disambiguation)
- Pat O'Doherty, Australian rugby player
