= Patty (disambiguation) =

A patty is a flattened cake or disc of chopped or ground ingredients prepared and served in various ways.

Patty may also refer to:

== People and fictional characters ==
- Patty (given name), a list of people and fictional characters with the given name
- Patty (surname), a list of people with the surname
- Patty (singer), stage name of Patricia Fink (born 1960), Japanese-American former singer and television personality in Japan
- Patty Gurdy, stage name of German hurdy-gurdy musician, singer, songwriter, and YouTuber Patricia Büchler (born 1997)

== Other uses ==
- "Patty" (The Good Place), an episode of the American comedy television series The Good Place
- List of storms named Patty

== See also ==
- Jamaican patty
- Haitian patty
- Paddy (disambiguation)
- Padi (disambiguation)
- Patti (disambiguation)
- Pattie (disambiguation)
- Pattycake
- Paty (disambiguation)
