= Paddy (given name) =

Paddy is a unisex given name. It is often short for Patrick, Patricia, or Pádraig.

Notable people include:

== Men ==
- Paddy Ashdown (1941–2018), British politician and diplomat
- Paddy Barnes (born 1987), Irish amateur boxer
- Paddy Baumann (1885–1969), American baseball player
- Paddy Belton (1926–87), Irish politician
- Paddy Bradley (born 1981), Irish Gaelic footballer
- Paddy Buckley (1925–2008), Scottish footballer
- Paddy Chayefsky (1923–81), American playwright, screenwriter and novelist
- Paddy Clancy (1922–98), Irish folk singer
- Paddy Considine (born 1973), English actor, filmmaker, screenwriter and musician
- Paddy Corrigan (born 1962), Irish retired hurling player
- Paddy Cullen, Irish former football goalkeeper and manager
- Paddy Daly (1888–1957), member of the Irish Republican Army and major-general in the Irish National Army
- Paddy Doherty (disambiguation), several people
- Paddy Donegan (1923–2000), Irish politician
- Paddy Driscoll (1896–1968), American football quarterback in both the Pro and College Football Halls of Fame
- Paddy Finucane (1920–1942), Second World War flying ace with the Royal Air Force
- Paddy Fisher (born 1998), American football player
- Paddy George, New Zealand rugby union and rugby league footballer who played in the 1900s and 1910s
- Paddy Glackin (born 1954), Irish fiddler
- Paddy Golden (born 1972), Northern Irish emergency physician and sports doctor
- Paddy Gormley (1916–2001), Irish politician
- Charles Patrick Green (1914–1999), South African-born British Royal Air Force Second World War fighter ace
- Paddy Greene (1875–1934), American baseball player
- Paddy Greene (hurler) (1916–1997), Irish hurler
- Paddy Harrington (1933–2005), Irish Gaelic footballer
- Paddy Harte (1931–2018), Irish politician
- Paddy Hayes (born 1965), Irish Gaelic footballer
- Paddy Henderson (disambiguation), multiple people
- Paddy Keenan (1950–2026), Irish player of the uilleann pipes
- Paddy Kennedy (disambiguation), various people
- Paddy Kenny (born 1978), Premier League football goalkeeper
- Paddy Larkin, Irish hurling player of the 1930s and 1940s
- Paddy Livingston (1880–1977), American baseball player
- Paddy Lowe (born 1962), British motor racing engineer
- Paddy Mayne (1915–55), British Army lieutenant colonel and founder of the elite Special Air Service, solicitor and Irish rugby union international
- Paddy Mayes (1885–1963), American baseball player
- Paddy McAloon (born 1957), English singer, songwriter and member of the band Prefab Sprout
- Paddy McCarthy (born 1983), Irish footballer
- Paddy McCourt (born 1983), Footballer from Northern Ireland
- Paddy McGuinness (born 1973), English comedian, actor, television personality and presenter
- Paddy McNair (born 1995), Footballer from Northern Ireland
- Paddy Mendis (1933–2022), 4th Commander of the Sri Lanka Air Force
- Paddy Mitchell (1942–2007), Canadian bank robber
- Paddy Moloney (1938–2021), founder and leader of the Irish musical group The Chieftains
- Paddy Moore (1909–51), Irish footballer
- Paddy Mullins (1919–2010), Irish racehorse trainer
- Paddy O'Brien (disambiguation), several people
- Paddy O'Connor (1879–1950), Irish-American baseball player
- Paddy O'Kane, Irish footballer during the 1920s and 1930s
- Paddy O'Keeffe (1864–?), Irish hurler
- Paddy Quinn (disambiguation), multiple people
- Paddy Reilly (disambiguation), various people
- Paddy Ryan (1851–1900), Irish American boxer and world heavyweight champion (1880–1882)
- J.P. "Paddy" Saul (1895–1968), Irish aviator and seaman
- Paddy Siglin (1891–1956), American baseball player
- Paddy Smith (disambiguation), multiple people
- Paddy Tuimavave, former professional rugby league footballer who represented New Zealand and Western Samoa
- Paddy Wallace (born 1979), Irish rugby union footballer

== Women ==
- Paddy Bassett (1918–2019), New Zealand agricultural scientist
- Paddy Bell (disambiguation), multiple people
- Paddy Christie (journalist) (born 1945), Scottish journalist
- Paddy Croft (1923–2025), English born Irish-American actress
- Paddy Figgis (1939–2014), Irish archeologist and author
- Paddy Higson (1941–2025), Scottish film producer
- Paddy Johnson, American art educator and entrepreneur
- Paddy Jones (born 1934), British salsa dancer
- Paddy Kitchen (1934–2005), English novelist, biographer, and art critic
- Paddy McGroarty, British international footballer
- Paddy Naismith (1903–1963), British actress, pilot, racing driver
- Paddy O'Reilly (writer) (born 1959), Australian writer
- Paddy O'Sullivan (1918–1994), Special Operations Agent in France
- Paddy Richardson, New Zealand writer
- Paddy Ridsdale (1921–2009), British secretary and intelligence operative
- Paddy Russell (1928–2017), British television director
- Paddy Summerfield (artist) (1929–2015), British artist
- Paddy Torsney (born 1962), Canadian politician
- Paddy Walker (1916–2015), New Zealand teacher, peace activist, and politician

== See also ==
- Patti (name), given name and surname
- Patty (given name)
