= Patsy =

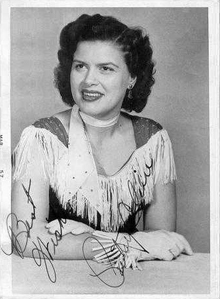
- Country western singer Patsy Cline (1932–1963)
- Pronunciation: /ˈpætsi/ PAT-see
- Gender: Unisex

Origin
- Origin: Latin Patricius
- Meaning: "Noble" (i.e. a patrician)
- Region of origin: north England, Scotland, & Ireland

Other names
- Related names: Martha, Matilda, Mattie, Patricia, Patrick, Patti, Patty

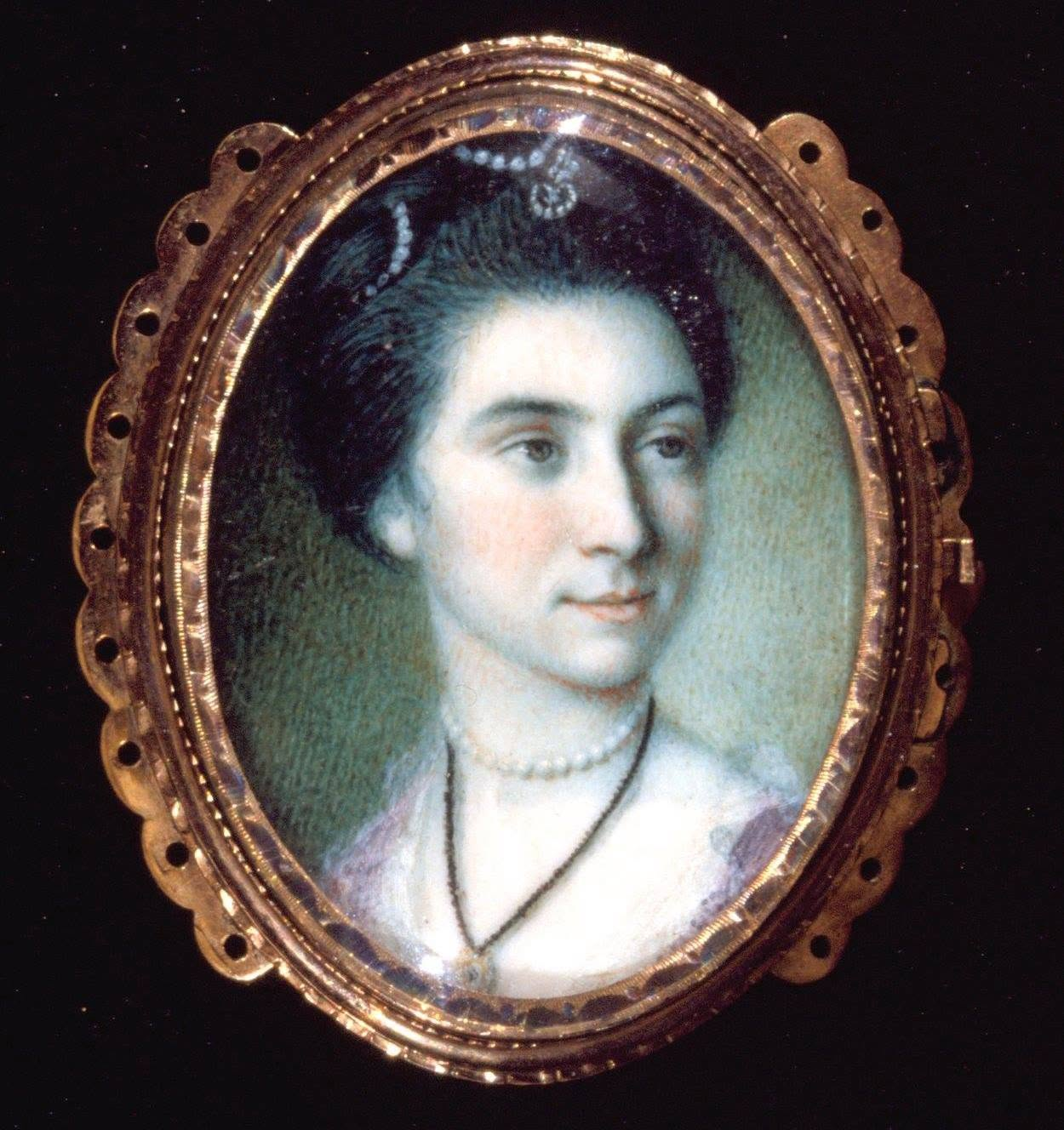
Patsy Custis (1756–1773), the daughter of Martha Washington and stepdaughter of George Washington.

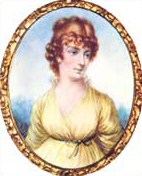
Martha Jefferson Randolph (1772–1836), was nicknamed Patsy.

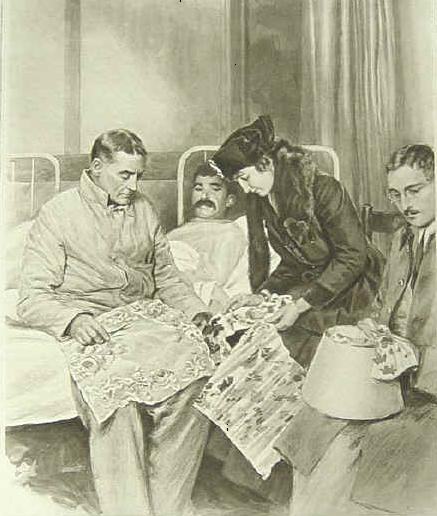
Princess Patricia of Connaught (1886–1974), pictured with wounded Canadian soldiers in 1917. Her nickname was Patsy.

Patsy is a given name often used as a diminutive of the feminine given name Patricia or sometimes the masculine name Patrick, or occasionally other names containing the syllable "Pat" (such as Cleopatra, Patience, or Patrice). Among Italian Americans, it is often used as a pet name for Pasquale.

In older usage, Patsy was also a nickname for Martha or Matilda, following a common nicknaming pattern of changing an M to a P (such as in Margaret → Meg/Meggy → Peg/Peggy; and Molly → Polly) and adding a feminine suffix.

President George Washington called his wife, Martha, "Patsy" in private correspondence. President Thomas Jefferson's eldest daughter Martha was known by the nickname "Patsy", while his daughter Mary was called "Polly".

== Women with the name ==
- Patsy Adam-Smith (1924–2001), Australian author, historian, and servicewoman
- Patsy Aldana, Canadian children's book publisher
- Patsy Biscoe (born 1946), Australian children's entertainer
- Patsy Burt (1928–2001), British motor racing driver
- Patsy Byrne (1933–2014), English actress
- Patsy Chapman (born 1948), British newspaper editor
- Patsy Cline (1932–1963), American country singer
- Pat Danner (born 1934), American politician
- Patsy De Forest (1894–1966), American actress
- Patsy Elsener (1929–2019), American diver
- Patsy Ferran (born 1989), Spanish-British actress
- Patsy Gallant (born 1948), Canadian singer and actress
- Patsy Garrett (1921–2015), American actress and singer
- Patsy Hazlewood (born 1949), American politician
- Patsy Jo Hilliard (born 1937), African-American educator
- Patsy Jorgensen (born 1943), New Zealand bowler
- Patsy Kelly (1910–1981), American actress
- Patsy Kensit (born 1968), British actress and singer
- Patsy Knight (born 1938), American politician
- Patsy Lawlor (1933–1997), Irish politician, nurse and businesswoman
- Patsy Lovell (born 1954), English cricketer, member of the 1988 World Cup team
- Patsy Lynch (born 1953), American photographer
- Patsy May (born 1947), Australian cricketer 1968–1976
- Patsy Ruth Miller (1904–1995), American actress
- Patsy Mink (1927–2002), American politician
- Patsy O'Connor (1930–2017), American actress and entertainer
- Patsy O'Leary (1910–????), American actress
- Patsy Palmer (born 1972), English actress and DJ
- Patsy Parsons (1931–2006), American character actress
- Patsy Pulitzer (1928–2011), American model, socialite and philanthropist
- Patsy Quick, English motorcycle racer
- Patsy Ramsey (1956–2006), mother of slain child beauty queen JonBenet Ramsey
- Patsy Reddy (born 1954), Governor-General of New Zealand
- Patsy Robertson (1933–2020), Jamaican diplomat and journalist
- Patsy Rodenburg (born 1953), British voice coach, author and theatre director
- Patsy Rowlands (1934–2005), British actress in the Carry On films
- Patsy Seddon, Scottish harpist, violinist, and traditional singer
- Patsy Sörensen (born 1952), Belgian politician and social activist
- Patsy O’Connell Sherman (1930–2008), American chemist and co-inventor of Scotchgard
- Patsy Ford Simms (born 1946), American composer, arranger, and educator
- Patsy Smart (1918–1996), English actress
- Patsy Stephen, Australian actress
- Patsy Ticer (1935–2017), American politician
- Patsy Terrell (1961–2017), American politician
- Patsy Torres (born 1957), American singer
- Patsy Vatlet, Belgian politician
- Patsy Widakuswara, Indonesian-American radio and broadcast journalist
- Patsy Willard (born 1941), American diver
- Patsy Wolfe, Australian lawyer and judge
- Patsy Yates, Australian nursing academic and palliative care specialist
- Patsy Yuen (born 1952), Jamaican designer and beauty pageant titleholder

== Men with the name ==
- Frank Boylen (1878–1938), English professional rugby league footballer
- Patsy Bradley (born 1984), Gaelic footballer from Northern Ireland
- Patsy Breen, Gaelic footballer
- Patsy Brophy (born 1970), Irish retired hurler
- Patsy Brown (1872–1958), Irish-American maker of uilleann pipes
- Patsy Callighen (1906–1964), Canadian National Hockey League player
- Patsy Clark, American millionaire
- Patsy Conroy (1846–????), American burglar and river pirate
- Patrick Conway (1865–1929), American bandleader
- Patsy Corcoran (1893–1967), Scottish professional footballer
- Patsy Donovan (1865–1953), Irish-American Major League Baseball player and manager
- Patsy Dorgan (1936–2021), Irish footballer
- Patsy Dougherty (1876–1940), American Major League Baseball player
- Patrick Durack (1834–1898), Australian pastoralist
- Patsy Fagan (born 1951), Irish retired professional snooker player
- Patsy Flaherty (1876–1968), American baseball player
- Patsy Flannelly (1909–1939), Irish Gaelic footballer
- Patsy Foley (born 1943), Irish retired hurler
- Patsy Gallacher (1891–1953), Irish footballer
- Patsy Gerardi, American football player
- Patsy Gharrity (1892–1966), American professional baseball player and coach
- Pascal Giugliano (1900–1976), American football player
- Patsy Gormley (1932–2022), Gaelic footballer
- Patsy Grimaldi (1931–2025), founder of the Grimaldi's Pizzeria
- Patsy Groogan, Irish politician
- Patsy Guzzo (1914–1993), Canadian ice hockey player
- Patsy Harte (born 1940), Irish former hurler
- Patsy Hendren (1889–1962), British cricketer
- Patsy Houlihan (1929–2006), English snooker player
- Patsy Joyce (born 2005/2006), Irish boxer
- Patsy Keefe (1878–1941), American football coach
- Patsy Klengenberg, Danish-Canadian trader
- Pasquale Patsy Lancieri, founder of the Patsy's Pizzeria
- Pasqualino Lolordo (1887–1929), Italian-American mobster
- Patsy McGaffigan (1888–1940), American baseball player
- Patsy McGarry, writer and newspaper editor
- Patsy McGlone (born 1959), Irish politician
- Paddy McIlvenny (1900–1931), Irish professional footballer
- Patsy McLarnon, Gaelic footballer
- Patsy Moran (born 1951), Irish hurler
- Patsy O'Hara (1957–1981), Irish Republican hunger striker and member of the Irish National Liberation Army
- Patsy O'Rourke (1881–1956), American baseball player
- Patsy Dan Rodgers (1944–2018), Irish painter, musician, and King of Tory
- Patsy Rowland (born 1943), Irish hurling coach and player
- Pasquale Patsy Scognamillo, founder of the Patsy's
- Patsy Séguin (1887–1918), Canadian professional ice hockey player
- Patsy Sweeney (1879–1948), American boxer
- Patsy Tebeau (1864–1918), American baseball player and manager
- Patsy Touhey (1865–1923), American comedian
- Patsy Trecost, American politician
- Patsy Vidalia (1921–1982), American female impersonator, singer, and entertainer
- Patsy Watchorn (born 1944), Irish folk singer

== Fictional characters ==
- Patsy (Monty Python), in the 1975 film Monty Python and the Holy Grail, and also the 2005 Monty Python inspired musical Spamalot
- Patsy, the title character in the newspaper comic strip The Adventures of Patsy (1935–1954)
- Patsy Parisi, in HBO series The Sopranos
- Patsy Pirati, in the film Once Upon a Time in Brooklyn (2013)
- Patsy Sewer, a singer on the Canadian television program Instant Star
- Patsy Smiles, a mongoose who is in love with Lazlo in the 2005 American animated television series Camp Lazlo
- Patsy Stone, one of the main characters in the 1992–2005 British television series Absolutely Fabulous, played by Joanna Lumley
- Patsy Walker, also known as "Hellcat", a Marvel Comics superhero

== Victim of deception ==
The popularity of the name has waned with the rise of its, chiefly North American, meaning as "dupe" or "scapegoat". Fact, Fancy and Fable, published in 1889, notes that in a sketch performed in Boston "about twenty years ago" a character would repeatedly ask "Who did that?" and the answer was "Patsy Bolivar!" It may have been popularized by the vaudevillian Billy B. Van, whose 1890s character, Patsy Bolivar, was more often than not an innocent victim of unscrupulous or nefarious characters. Van's character became a broad vaudeville "type", imitated by many comedians, including Fred Allen, who later wrote, "Patsy Bolivar was a slang name applied to a bumpkin character; later, it was shortened to Patsy, and referred to any person who was the butt of a joke."

Lee Harvey Oswald, after the assassination of John F. Kennedy, denied he was responsible for the murder, and stated: "No, they are taking me in because of the fact that I lived in the Soviet Union. I'm just a patsy!"

Byron Smith, after killing Haile Kifer and her cousin, Nicholas Brady, also claimed he was a patsy.
