= Patti, Iran =

Patti or Petti (Persian: پتي) in Iran may refer to:

- Petti, Chabahar
- Patti, Dashtiari, Chabahar County
- Petti Mohammad Jadgal, Chabahar County
