= Crago =

Crago may refer to:

== Places ==
- Crago Observatory in Australia
- Crago, Scotland, an island in the Outer Hebrides

== People ==
- Barry Crago, American politician from Wyoming
- Patrick E. Crago, biomedical engineer and professor
- Scott F. Crago (born 1963), American drummer
- Thomas S. Crago (1866–1925), United States Congressman
