= Denard =

Denard is a given name and surname. People with the name include:

== Given name ==
- Denard Robinson (born 1990), American football player
- Denard Span (born 1984), American baseball player
- Denard Walker (born 1973), American football player

== Surname ==
- Bob Denard (1929–2007), French mercenary
- Patrick J. Denard (fl. 2000s–2020s), American orthopedic surgeon and researcher
- Michaël Denard (1944–2023), French dancer and stage actor
