= Patrick Doherty =

Patrick or Paddy Doherty may refer to:

- Paddy Doherty (activist) (1926–2016), Northern Irish activist
- Pat Doherty (Northern Ireland politician) (born 1945), Irish politician.
- Pat Doherty (Canadian politician) (1914–1973), Canadian politician.
- Paddy Doherty (Gaelic footballer) (1934–2026), Irish Gaelic footballer
- Paddy Doherty (TV personality) (born 1959), Irish Traveller and bare-knuckle boxer
- Pat Doherty (boxer) (born 1962), English boxer
- Paddy Doherty (boxer), Northern Irish boxer
- Patrick J. Doherty, United States Air Force general

== See also ==
- Pat Doherty (disambiguation)
- Pat O'Doherty (born 1966), Australian rugby player
