= Patty (given name) =

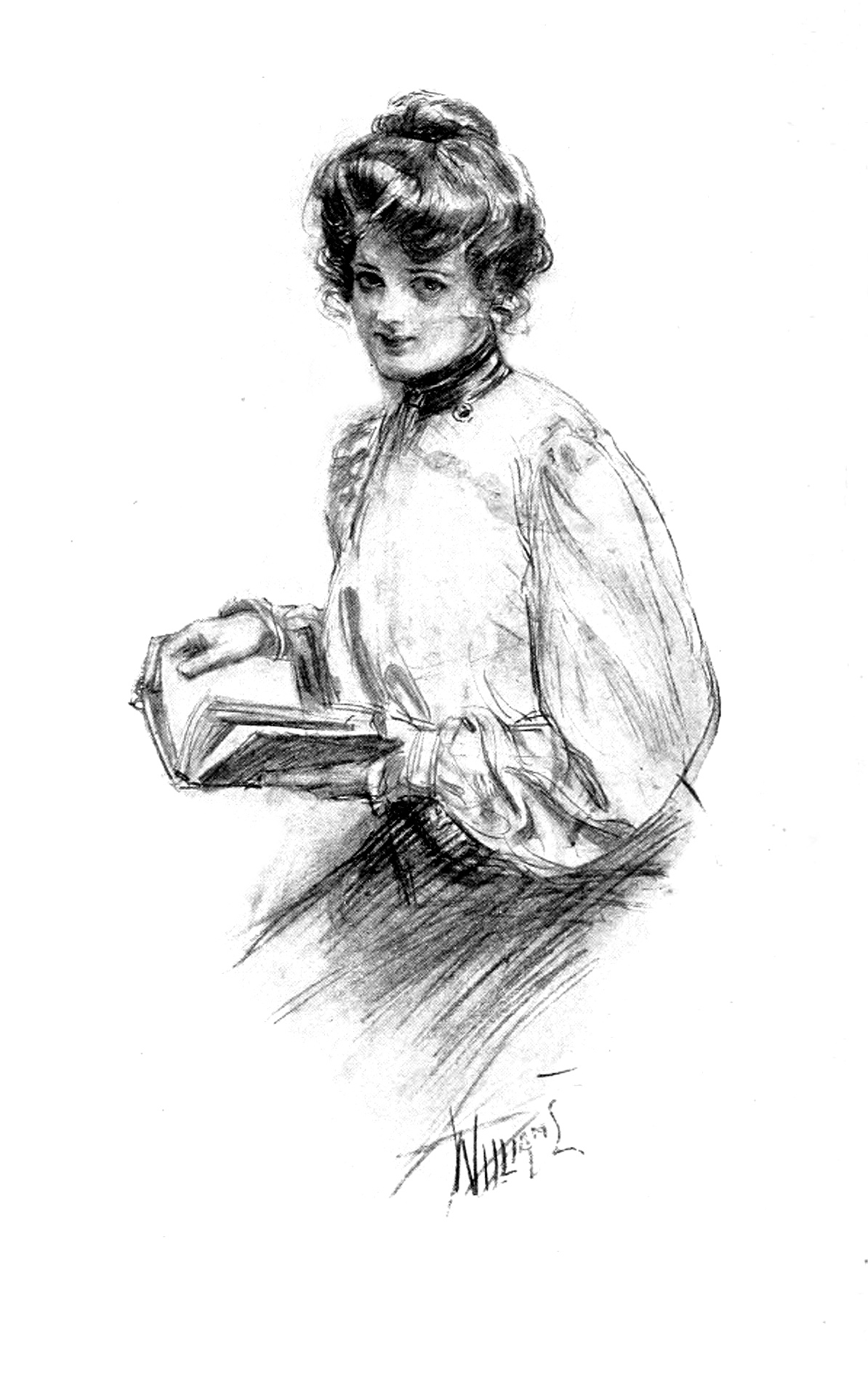
- Patty Wyatt is the main character of When Patty Went to College, a 1903 novel by American author Jean Webster.
- Gender: Primarily female

Origin
- Origin: English
- Meaning: diminutive of Martha, Patricia, or Patrick

Other names
- Related names: Mattie, Paddy, Patti, Patsy, Pattie

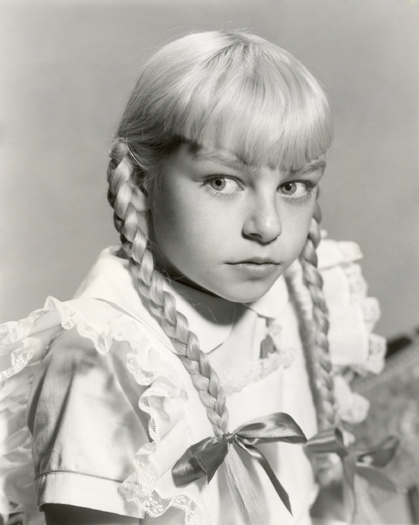
American child actress Patty McCormack in a publicity photo from the 1956 film The Bad Seed.

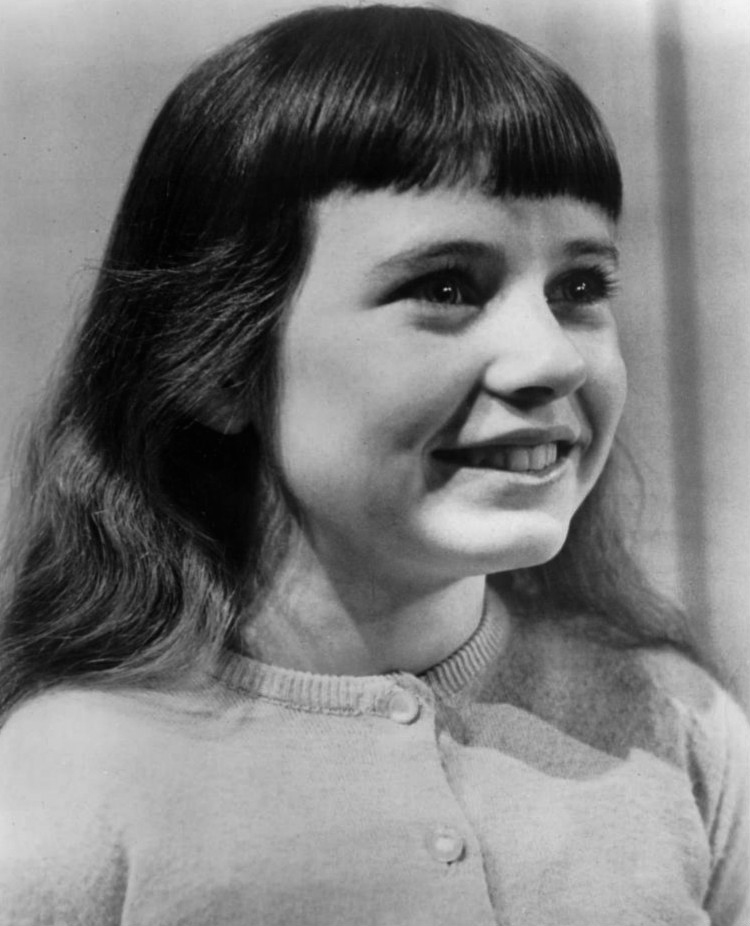
American child actress Patty Duke in a 1959 publicity photo.

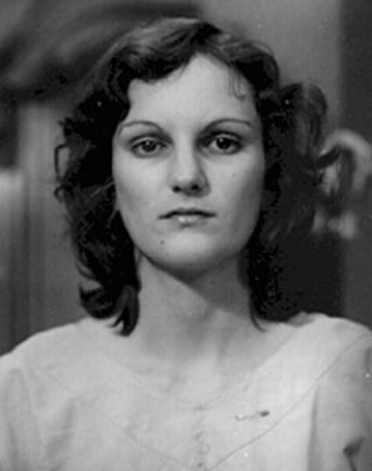
A 1975 mug shot of heiress Patty Hearst taken the year after her kidnapping by the Symbionese Liberation Army

Patty is an English given name that originated as a rhyming diminutive form of names such as Martha via the diminutive Mattie, much in the same way that Peggy was derived as a rhyming variant of Meg or Meggie, an English diminutive of Margaret, and Polly was originally derived as a rhyming variant of Molly, an English diminutive of Mary. The alternation of the letter P with the letter M in these English hypocorisms is not understood. The diminutive was used in Colonial America. It was later used as an English short form of Patricia or, for boys, as a diminutive form of Patrick. It is also in use as an independent name. Spelling variants include Patti and Pattie. Patsy is another related variant. Patty is also in use as a surname with different origins.

The name was among the 1,000 most used names for newborn girls in the United States between 1919 and 1978. It peaked in 1959, when it was the 146th most used name for American girls born that year.

It may refer to:

== Women ==
- Patricia Patty Abramson (1944–2019), American venture capitalist
- Patricia "Patty" Andrews (1918–2013), American singer of the Andrews Sisters singing trio
- Patricia Baker (born 1967), American academic
- Patricia Patty Berg (1918–2006), American LPGA golfer
- Patty Berg (politician) (1942–2024), American politician
- Patty Berg-Burnett, volleyball player and coach
- Petula Patty Brard (born 1955), Dutch entrepreneur and entertainer of Dutch-Indonesian descent
- Patricia Patty Brennan, Colombian-American evolutionary biologist and behavioral ecologist
- Patricia Büchler (born 1997), known professionally as Patty Gurdy, German hurdy-gurdy musician, singer, songwriter, and YouTuber
- Patty Butler (born 1952), American politician
- Patty Cannon (c. 1759–1829), American illegal slave trader, serial killer, and criminal gang member
- Patricia Patty Cardenas (born 1984), American water polo player
- Patricia Patty Caretto (born 1951), American swimmer and Olympian
- Patricia Patty Carroll (born 1946), American photographer
- Patty Chang (born 1972), American performance artist and film director
- Patricia Patty Clancy, American politician
- Patty Connell, American former rugby union player
- Patty Costello (1947–2009), American professional bowler
- Patty Dann (born 1953), American novelist and nonfiction writer
- Patricia Patty Donahue (1956–1996), American singer
- Patty Dowdell (born ca. 1954–1955), American retired volleyball player
- Anna Marie Patty Duke (1946–2016), American actress
- Patty Duncan, South African politician
- Patty Fendick (born 1965), American former tennis player and coach
- Patricia "Patty" Fink (born 1960), aka Patty (singer), Japanese-American former singer, tarento, and English teacher in Japan
- Patty Friedmann (born 1946), American novelist
- Patricia Patty Gasso (born 1962), American college softball coach
- Patricia Patty Griffin (born 1964), American singer, songwriter and musician
- Patty Guggenheim, American comedian, writer, and actress
- Patricia Patty Hajdu (born 1966), Canadian politician
- Patty Hayes (born 1955), American professional golfer
- Patricia Patty Hearst (born 1954), American socialite, kidnap victim and member of the Symbionese Liberation Army
- Patty Hill (1868–1946), American composer and teacher, co-writer of the tune which later became "Happy Birthday to You"
- Patricia Patty Hopkins, (born 1942), British architect
- Patty Hou, Taiwanese journalist born Hóu Pèicén (born 1977)
- Patricia Patty Jenkins (born 1971), American film director and screenwriter
- Patricia Patty Jervey (born 1964), American former rugby union player
- Patricia Darcy Jones (1953–2007), American rock singer, vocalist, and Broadway actress
- Patty Judge (born 1943), American politician
- Patty Kazmaier-Sandt (1962–1990), American college women's ice hockey player
- Patricia Patty Kempner (born 1942), American retired swimmer, Olympic champion and world record holder
- Patty Kim (filmmaker), Canadian filmmaker
- Patty Kim (politician) (born 1973), American politician
- Patricia Patty Kuderer (born 1958), American politician and attorney
- Patty Larkin (born 1951), American singer-songwriter and guitarist
- Patty Lin, American television screenwriter and producer
- Patty López, American politician elected to the California State Assembly in 2014
- Patty Loveless (born 1957), American country music singer born Patty Lee Ramey
- Patty Loverock (born 1953), Canadian sprinter
- Patty Maloney (1936–2025), American actress
- Patty Markley (born 1969), American politician
- Patty McCord, Netflix executive
- Patricia Patty McCormack (born 1945), American actress
- Patricia Patty Moise (born 1960), American former NASCAR driver
- Patty Mullen, American actress
- Patricia Patty Murray (born 1950), American politician
- Patty Olson (born 1958), Canadian volleyball player
- Patty Paine (born 1965), American poet, author, and academic
- Patty Parker, American singer, drummer, producer, and co-owner of record label Comstock Records
- Patty Petersen (born 1954), American actress
- Patty Pravo (born 1948), Italian singer born Nicoletta Strambelli
- Patricia Patty Ritchie (born 1962), American politician
- Patricia Robertson (1963–2001), American physician and astronaut
- Patty Rodriguez, American entrepreneur, producer, radio personality, and author
- Patty Rosborough, American stand-up comedian, actor, and television writer
- Bridget Patty Ryan (1961–2023), German singer
- Patty Sahota, Canadian politician in office 2001–2005
- Patty Schachtner (born 1960), American first responder and politician
- Patricia Patty Schemel (born 1967), American drummer and musician
- Patty Schnyder (born 1978), Swiss retired tennis player
- Patty Bartlett Sessions (1795–1892), American early member of the Church of Jesus Christ of Latter-day Saints, one of Joseph Smith's wives, and midwife
- Patty Seymour (born 1957), ring name Leilani Kai, American semi-retired professional wrestler
- Patricia Patty Shea (born 1962), American former field hockey player and Olympian
- Patty Sheehan (born 1956), American professional golfer
- Patricia Patty Shepard (1945–2013), American film actress based in Spain
- Patty Shwartz (born 1961), American federal judge
- Patricia Patty Smyth (born 1957), American singer and songwriter, leader of the rock band Scandal
- Patty Sonnekson (1927–1951), American retired pairs figure skater
- Diana Patricia "Patty" Soto (born 1980), Peruvian volleyball player
- Patty Stair (1869–1926), American organist and composer
- Patty Marie Stinson (born 1970), American politician
- Patty Stolzenbach (born 1989), Dutch badminton player
- Patricia Patty Sullivan (born 1968), Canadian television presenter and actress
- Patricia Patty Talahongva (born 1962), American Hopi journalist, documentary producer, and news executive
- Patty Thomas (1922–2014), American dancer, USO entertainer, and actress
- Patricia Patty Thompson (swimmer) (born 1945), Canadian former freestyle swimmer
- Patty Trossèl (born 1963), Dutch singer and composer
- Patty Tucker (born 1954), American bridge player and teacher
- Patty Van Acker (born 1976), Belgian retired professional tennis player
- Patricia Patty Van Wolvelaere (born 1950), American retired hurdler
- Patricia Patty Wagstaff (born 1951), American aviator and national aerobatic champion
- Patty Waters (1946–2024), American jazz vocalist
- Patty Weaver, American actress
- Patricia Patty Wetterling (born 1949), American advocate of children's safety and politician
- Patty Wickman (born 1959), American artist and academic
- Patricia Patty Willis (1910–1985), American aviator
- Patty Wong (model) (born 1980), Peruvian model

== Men ==
- Patrick Carrigan (born 1998), Australian rugby league footballer
- Patrick Cottrell, American writer born Patty Yumi Cottrell (born 1981)
- Patrick Herbert (born 1997), New Zealand professional rugby league footballer
- Patric Hörnqvist (born 1987), Swedish former ice hockey player based in the United States
- Patrick Kane (born 1988), American ice hockey player
- Patrik Laine (born 1998), Finnish ice hockey player
- Patrick Mago (born 1994), New Zealand rugby league footballer
- Patrick Marleau (born 1979), Canadian ice hockey player
- Patrick Patty Mills (born 1988), Australian basketball player
- Patrick Patty Obasi (1951–2012), Nigerian gospel singer
- Patrick Roy (born 1965), Canadian ice hockey coach, executive and former goaltender
- Paterika Vaivai (born 1992), Samoan rugby league footballer

== Fictional characters ==
- Patty Bouvier, on the television series The Simpsons
- Patricia Patty Halliwell, one of the main characters on the television series Charmed
- Patty Keys, in Ninjago
- Patricia Martin (パトリシア・マーティン), a fictional character with her nickname Patty (パティ) in the slice-of-life comedy manga and anime series Lucky Star
- Patricia Patty Spivot, a DC Comics friend and partner of the second Flash
- Patricia Patty Williams, on the American soap opera The Young and the Restless
- Peppermint Patty and Patty (Peanuts), two characters in the comic strip Peanuts
- Patty, in the video game Dead or Alive Xtreme 3

== See also ==
- Paddy (given name)
- Patti (name), given name and surname
