= Paddy =

Paddy may refer to:

- Paddy (given name), a list of people with the given name or nickname

== Birds ==
- Paddy (pigeon), a Second World War carrier pigeon
- Snowy sheathbill or paddy, a bird species
- Black-faced sheathbill, also known as the paddy bird

== Entertainment ==
- Paddy (film), a 1970 Irish comedy
- Paddy Kirk, a fictional character in the British soap opera Emmerdale
- Paddy, a fictional character in the animated series Scaredy Squirrel

== Other uses ==
- Paddy field, a type of cultivated land
- Paddy (unmilled rice)
- Paddy mail, a train for construction workers
- Paddy Whiskey, a liquor

== See also ==
- Patty (disambiguation)
- Paddi (disambiguation)
- Padi (disambiguation)
