= Patryk =

Patryk is a masculine given name of Polish origin, an equivalent of Patrick, which means "nobleman" or "patrician". Notable people with the given name include:

- Patryk Adamczyk (born 1994), Polish track and field athlete
- Patryk Aleksandrowicz (born 1983), Polish footballer
- Patryk Bryła (born 1990), Polish footballer
- Patryk Brzeziński (born 1984), Polish rower
- Patryk Chojnowski (born 1990), Polish table tennis player
- Patryk Czarnowski (born 1985), Polish volleyball player
- Patryk Dobek (born 1994), Polish track and field athlete and soldier
- Patryk Dudek (born 1992), Polish motorcycle speedway rider
- Patryk Dziczek (born 1998), Polish footballer
- Patryk Fryc (born 1993), Polish footballer
- Patryk Grzegorzewicz (born 2002), Polish sprinter
- Patryk Jaki (born 1985), Polish politician
- Patryk Klimala (born 1998), Polish footballer
- Patryk Klofik (born 1986), Polish footballer
- Patryk Królczyk (born 1994), Polish footballer
- Patryk Kubicki (born 1993), Polish footballer
- Patryk Kuchczyński (born 1983), Polish handball player
- Patryk Kun (born 1995), Polish footballer
- Patryk Lipski (born 1994), Polish footballer
- Stefan Liv (born Patryk Śliż; 1980–2011), Polish-born Swedish ice hockey player
- Patryk Małecki (born 1988), Polish footballer
- Patryk Mauer (born 1998), Polish handball
- Patryk Mikita (born 1993), Polish footballer
- Patryk Misik (born 1994), Canadian soccer player
- Patryk Mucha (born 1997), Polish footballer
- Patryk Niemiec (born 1997), Polish volleyball player
- Patryk Peda (born 2002), Polish footballer
- Patryk Piasecki (born 1986), Polish sailor
- Patryk Plewka (born 2000), Polish footballer
- Patryk Poręba (born 1992), Polish luger
- Patryk Procek (born 1995), Polish footballer
- Patryk Rachwał (born 1981), Polish football manager and player
- Patryk Rajkowski (born 1996), Polish track cyclist
- Patryk Rombel (born 1983), Polish handball coach
- Patryk Sieradzki (born 1998), Polish middle-distance runner
- Patryk Słotwiński (born 1994), Polish footballer
- Patryk Stefański (born 1990), Polish footballer
- Patryk Stępiński (born 1995), Polish footballer
- Patryk Stosz (born 1994), Polish racing cyclist
- Patryk Sokołowski (born 1994), Polish footballer
- Patryk Dominik Sztyber (born 1979), Polish guitarist
- Patryk Szwedzik (born 2001), Polish footballer
- Patryk Szysz (born 1998), Polish footballer
- Patryk Tuszyński (born 1989), Polish footballer
- Patryk Wajda (born 1998), Polish ice hockey player
- Patryk Walczak (born 1992), Polish handball player
- Patryk Walicki (born 2003), Polish footballer
- Patryk Wojdyło (born 1999), Polish motorcycle speedway rider
- Patryk Wolański (born 1991), Polish footballer
- Patryk Wolski (born 1993), Polish footballer
- Patryk Wronka (born 1995), Polish ice hockey player
- Patryk Wykrota (born 2000), Polish sprinter
- Patryk Zaucha (born 2000), Polish footballer
