= Pata =

Pata or PATA may refer to:

== Places ==
- Pata, Sulu, a Philippine municipality
- Pata, Galanta District, a village in Slovakia
- Pata, Central African Republic, a village
- Pata, South Australia, locality in the Murray Mallee region
- Pata village (Samoa), a village in Samoa
- Pontrilas Army Training Area, a British Army training camp in England
- Provincially Administered Tribal Areas, tribal areas administered by Khyber-Pakhtunkhwa province of Pakistan
- Pata, a village in Apahida Commune, Romania
- Pata island, in the Faichuk group of islands, Micronesia

== Other uses ==
- Anatoli Pata (1958–2025), Russian football player and coach
- Pata (musician) (born 1965), Japanese guitarist
- Ralph M. Calhoun Memorial Airport (ICAO code), airport in Tanana, Alaska
- Parallel ATA, an obsolete computer interface for hard disk drive, optical disc drive, and/or solid-state drive
- Pata (sword), an Indian weapon
- Pacific Asia Travel Association
- PATA, a Latvian company
- PATA, Finnish esports team

== See also ==
- "Pata Pata", a song performed by Miriam Makeba and others
  - Pata Pata (album) by Miriam Makeba
- Pata Pata (Peru), a mountain
- Patach, a Hebrew niqqud vowel sign
- Patas, a species of monkey
- Patta (disambiguation)
