= Piatti (surname) =

Piatti is an Italian surname. Notable people with the surname include:

- Carlo Alfredo Piatti (1822–1901), Italian cellist
- Celestino Piatti (1922–2007), Swiss graphic artist, painter and book designer
- Giovanni Battista Piatti (1812–1867), Italian civil engineer
- Ignacio Piatti (born 1985), Argentine footballer
- Lorna Piatti-Farnell (born 1980), New Zealand academic
- Marco Piatti (born 1958), Swiss gymnast
- Pablo Piatti (born 1989), Argentine footballer
- Polo Piatti, Argentine composer, pianist and conductor
- Prospero Piatti (c. 1842–1902), Italian painter
- Lorna Piatti-Farnell (born 1980), New Zealand academic
- Riccardo Piatti (born 1958), Italian tennis coach
- Sante Piatti (1687–1747), Italian painter
- Ugo Piatti (1888–1953), Italian painter and instrument maker
- Virginia Tango Piatti (1869–1958), Italian writer and activist

== See also ==
- Piatti (disambiguation)
- Patti (surname)
