= Pat Baldwin =

Pat Baldwin may refer to:

- Pat Baldwin (basketball) (born 1972), American basketball coach and former player
- Pat Baldwin (footballer) (born 1982), English footballer

== See also ==
- Patrick Baldwin Jr. (born 2002), American basketball player
- Patrice Baldwin, British drama educator
