= Patti (surname) =

Patti is an Italian surname. Notable people with the surname include:

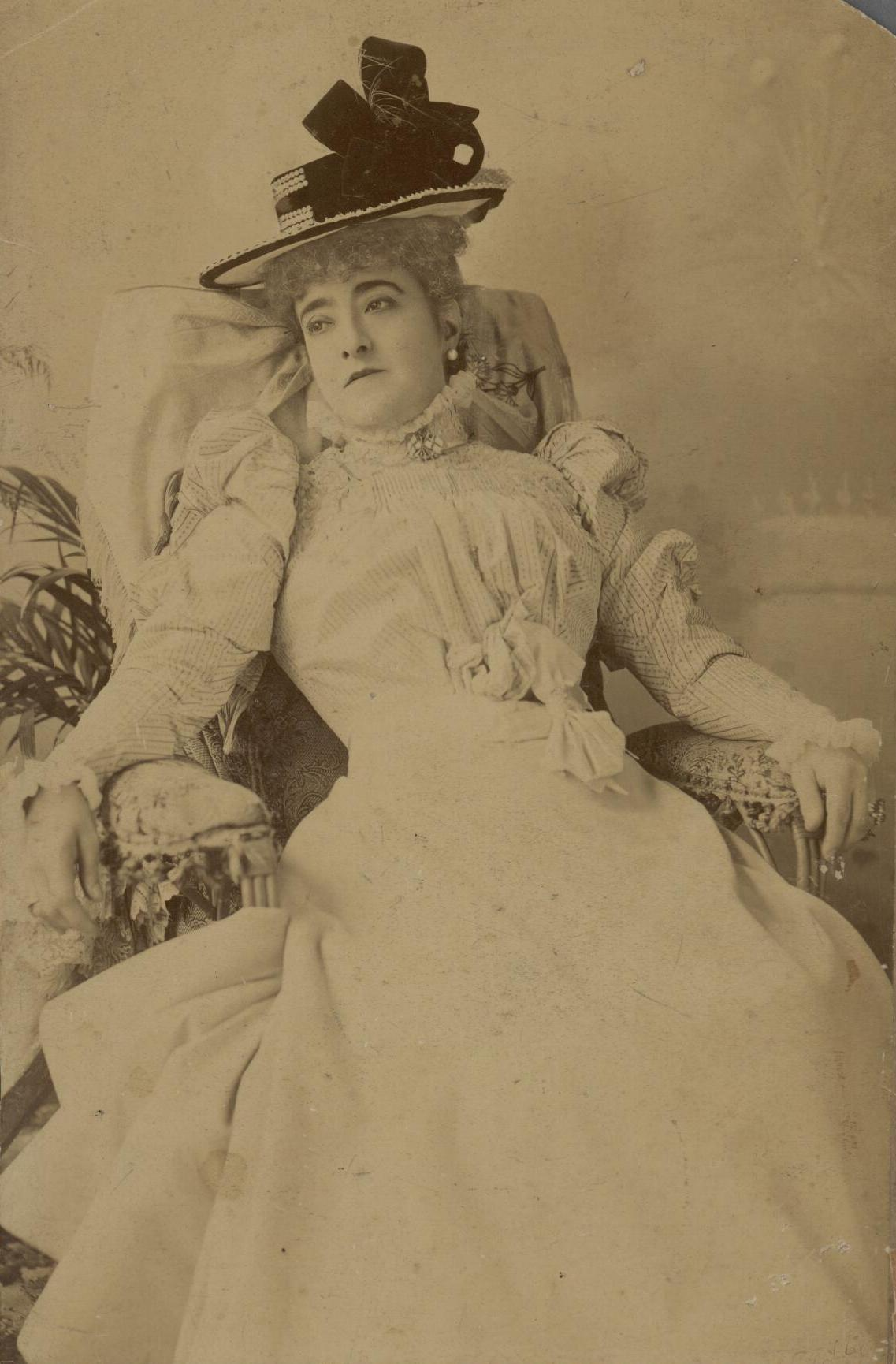
Opera singer Adelina Patti (1843–1919)

- Adelina Patti (1843–1919), Italian-French opera singer
- Antonino da Patti, Sicilian priest
- Archimedes Patti (1913–1998), lieutenant colonel in the United States Army and an Office of Strategic Services
- Carlotta Patti (1835–1889), Italian operatic soprano and older sister to famed soprano Adelina Patti
- Carmelo Patti (c. 1934–2016), Italian businessman with close links to the Mafia
- Cathy Gentile-Patti (born 1962), American para-alpine skier
- Dino Patti Djalal (born 1965), former Indonesian ambassador to the United States
- Ercole Patti (1903–1976), Italian author, dramatist, screenwriter and journalist
- Guesch Patti (1946–2026), French singer
- Leonardo Patti (born 1978), Argentine volleyball player
- Luis Patti (born 1952), Argentine politician and a former senior police officer
- Tom Patti (born 1963), American businessman and politician

== See also ==
- Patti (given name)
- Patti (disambiguation)
- Piatti (surname)
- Patty (surname)
