= Pádraigín =

Pádraigín is a given name in the Irish language, formed by adding the diminutive suffix -ín to the name Pádraig (the Irish equivalent of Patrick). The suffix was formerly used as a hypocoristic, giving a male pet name akin to "little Pádraig"; latterly it was a feminiser used to Gaelicise Patricia, the English feminine form of Patrick.

== People with the given name ==
- Pádraigín Haicéad (c.1604–1654), Dominican priest and Irish-language poet
- Padraigín Ní Mhurchú (1949–2019), Irish trade unionist
- Pádraigín Ní Uallacháin (fl. 1976–2010s), Irish singer, songwriter and academic
- Enya (born 1961), Irish singer, real name Eithne Pádraigín Ní Bhraonáin

== See also ==
- List of Irish-language given names
