= Patti =

Patti may refer to:

== People ==
- Patti (given name)
- Patti (surname)
- Patti caste, a caste in Sri Lanka

== Places ==
- Patti, Iran (disambiguation)
- Patti, Punjab, India
  - Patti, Punjab Assembly constituency, India
- Patti, Sicily
- Patti, Uttar Pradesh, India
  - Patti, Uttar Pradesh Assembly constituency, India
- Mount Patti, Nigeria

== Music ==
- Patti (album), a 1985 album by Patti LaBelle
- Sissieretta Jones, soprano and opera singer known as "The Black Patti"
- "Patti Rap", a song by A. R. Rahman, Shankar Mahadevan, Suresh Peters and Noel James from the 1994 Indian film Humse Hai Muqabala

== Other ==
- Patti (subdivision), a traditional method of land division in Punjab

== See also ==
- Pati (disambiguation)
- Pattie (disambiguation)
- Patty (disambiguation)
- Patta (disambiguation)
- Pettai (disambiguation)
- Petta (disambiguation)
