= Alessandro Mantovani =

Italian painter (1814–1892)

Alessandro Mantovani (1814–1892) was an Italian painter, best known for his decorative frescoes and restorations.

He was born in Ferrara, and active in Rome in the restoration of the Vatican Loggie and decoration in the Palazzo Quirinale. He also worked in restoration, under Filippo Agricola, of stairwell frescoes in the Lateran Palace in Rome. One of his pupils was Prospero Piatti.
