= Patrick Riley =

Patrick Riley may refer to:

== People ==
- Patrick T. Riley (1941–2015), American political theorist
- G. Patrick Riley, 20th century artist, art educator and mask maker
- Patrick Riley, American musician formerly of The Ataris c. 2001
- Patrick Riley (born 1986), American musician of indie pop husband-and-wife duo Tennis
- Pat Riley (born 1945), American basketball executive, former coach and player
- Pat Riley (American football) (born 1972), American football player

== Fictional characters ==
- Pat (Saturday Night Live), Pat O'Neal Riley, an androgynous fictional character

== See also ==
- Patrick Reilly (disambiguation)
