= Patrick McGuinness (disambiguation) =

Patrick McGuinness (born 1968) is a British poet and writer.

Patrick McGuinness may also refer to:

== People ==
- Paddy McGuinness (born 1973), English comedian
- Paddy McGuinness (civil servant) (born 1963), British civil servant
- Paddy McGuinness (footballer) (1878–1918), Australian rules footballer
- Padraic McGuinness (1938–2008), Australian journalist

== Other uses ==
- Patrick McGuinness Three-Decker, a historic building in Worcester, Massachusetts, US

== See also ==
- Patrick Guinness (born 1956), Irish author
