= Paty =

Paty may refer to:

- Páty, a village in Hungary
- Paty (footballer) (born 1990), Angolan footballer
- Rafael Paty (born 1981), Brazilian footballer
- Samuel Paty (1973–2020), French victim of terrorism

== See also ==
- Patty (disambiguation)
