= Patrician =

Patrician may refer to:

- Patrician (ancient Rome), the original aristocratic families of ancient Rome, and a synonym for "aristocratic" in modern English usage
- Patrician (post-Roman Europe), the governing elites of cities in parts of medieval and Early Modern Europe
- The adjective formed from Saint Patrick
- Youngstown Patricians, a former semi-professional football team based in Youngstown, Ohio, USA
- A member of the Argentine Regiment of Patricians
- The Patrician, an annual publication of the Princess Patricia's Canadian Light Infantry regiment
- Packard Patrician, a large luxury car during the 1950s
- Havelock Vetinari, the Patrician of Ankh-Morpork in Terry Pratchett's Discworld series
- The Patrician (video game), a series of historical trading simulation computer games

== See also ==
- Patricius (disambiguation)
