= Kevin Collins (bridge) =

American bridge player

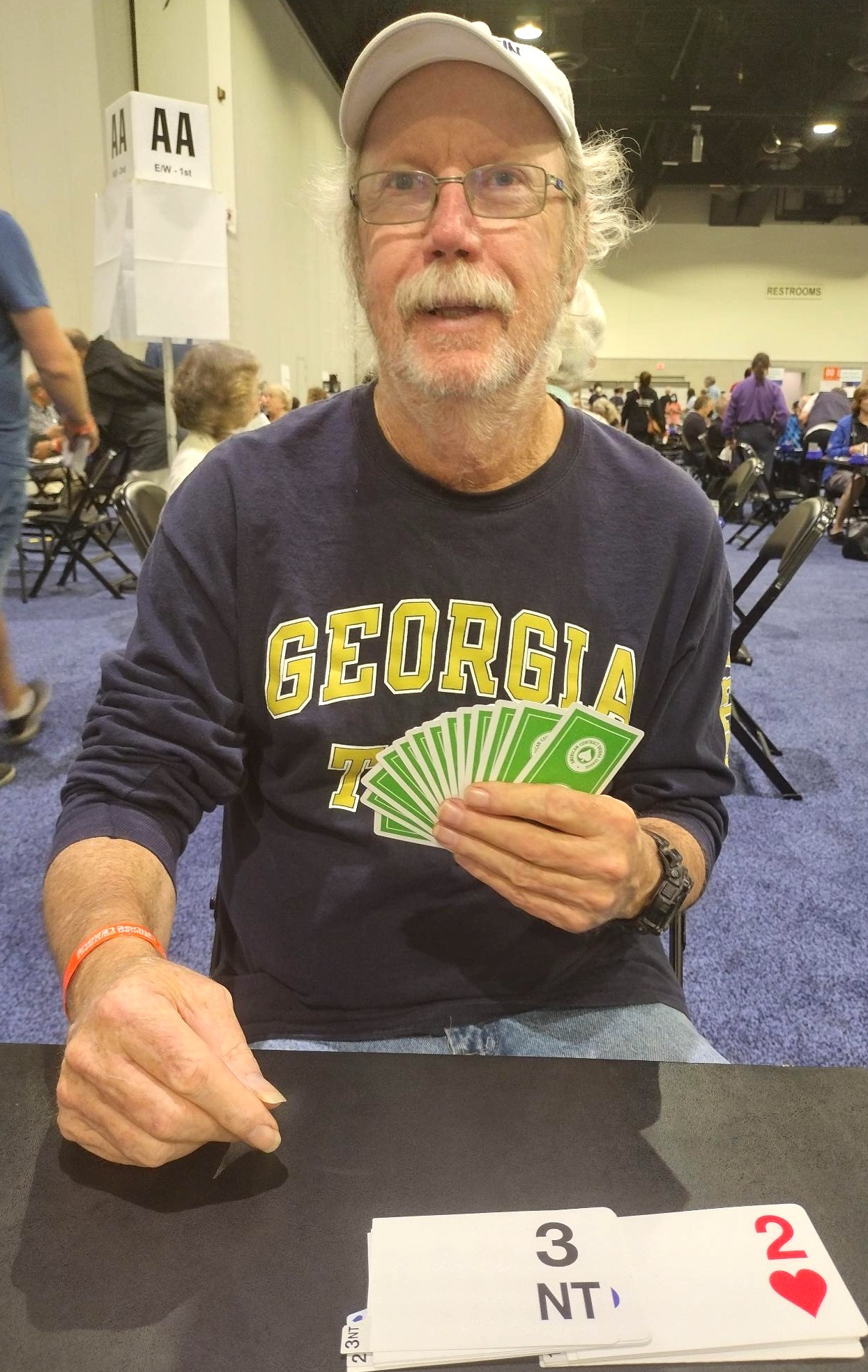

Kevin Collins is an American North American champion bridge player and an American Contract Bridge League (ACBL) Grand Life Master. He won the 2000 North American Pairs playing with Patty Tucker.

== Bridge accomplishments ==
=== Wins ===
- North American Bridge Championships (1)
  - North American Pairs (1) 2000

=== Runners-up ===
- North American Bridge Championships (1)
  - Nail Life Master Open Pairs (1) 2021

== Personal life ==
Kevin lives in Atlanta with his wife, Patty Tucker.
