= Paddi =

Paddi may refer to:

- Patricia Paddi Edwards (1931–1999), English-born American actress
- Emmanuel Paddi, Ghanaian tennis player - see 1989 Davis Cup Africa Zone Group II (also 1992–1995)
- Paddi, a character in the Chinese animated series Pleasant Goat and Big Big Wolf
- PADDI, the first disposable nappy (diaper), invented by Valerie Hunter Gordon

== See also ==
- Paddy (disambiguation)
- Padi (disambiguation)
