= Paddy Henderson =

Paddy Henderson may refer to:

- Paddy Henderson (journalist), former Team GB athlete, BBC journalist
- P Henderson & Company, a ship owning and management company
- Paddy Henderson (footballer) (born 1938), former Irish football player
- Paddy Henderson (charity organizer), co-founder of the Trussel Trust

== See also ==
- Pat Henderson (hurler) (born 1943), Irish former player and manager
- Patrick Henderson (active from 1973), American gospel keyboard player, songwriter and producer
