= Padi =

Padi, PADI or Pa Di may refer to:

== Places ==
- Padi, Chennai, India, a locality and neighbourhood in the city of Chennai
  - Padi railway station
- Padi, Iran, a village

== People ==
- Padi Boyd, American astrophysicist
- Padi Richo, Indian politician
- Sharon Dede Padi (c. 1975 – 2026), Ghanaian artist and poet

== Other uses ==
- Padi (band), an Indonesian rock band
- Pa Di language, spoken in the China-Vietnam border region
- PADI1, peptidyl arginine deiminase
- Professional Association of Diving Instructors (PADI), a scuba organization
- PPPoE Active Discovery Initiation, establishment of a connection via Point-to-Point Protocol over Ethernet

== See also ==
- Paddy (disambiguation)
- Paddi (disambiguation)
