= Prospero Piatti =

Italian painter (c. 1842–1902)

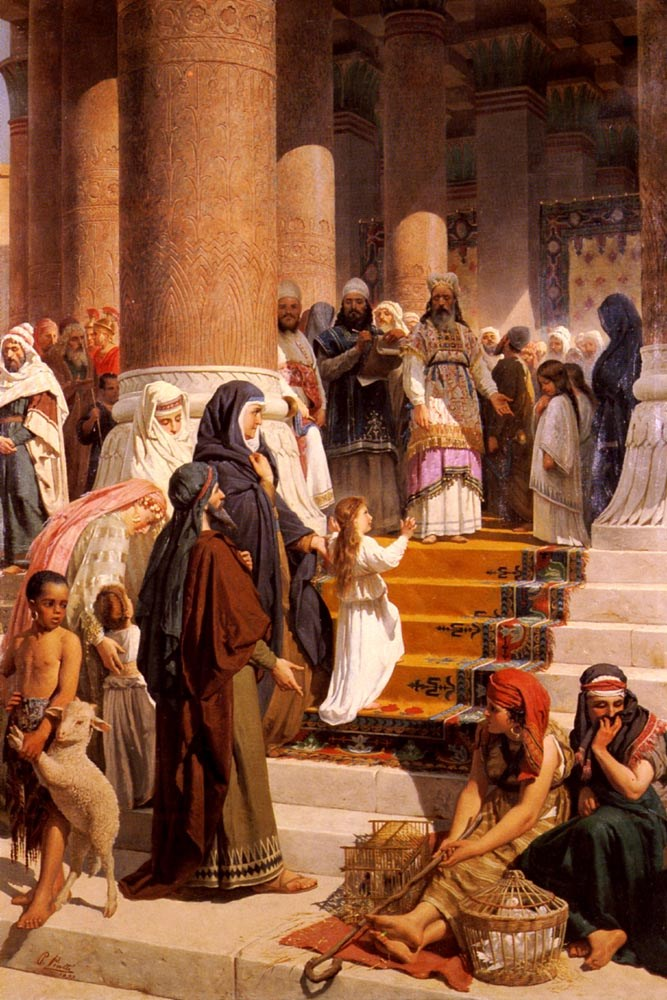
The Presentation Of The Virgin (1899)

Prospero Piatti (c. 1842 – 15 July 1902) was an Italian painter known for depiction of Neo-Pompeian and sacred subjects.

== Biography ==
He was born in Ferrara and died in Rome. As a boy, his family had moved to Rome and he learned his trade with Alessandro Mantovani, who was engaged in frescoing loggias of the Vatican. He then studied at the Accademia di San Luca with Tommaso Minardi and, for a year, with Friedrich Overbeck. This imbued him with the fading styles of Purismo circulating in Rome. In 1865, he gained one of the commissions to decorate San Paolo fuori le Mura, specifically the chapel of the choir, where he depicted the Life of Pope Gregory VII. He painted for rooms in the Villa Torlonia in Rome. He painted an altarpiece depicting the Baptism of Christ (1879) for the Cathedral of Ferrara. He also frescoed for the Sanctuary of Our Lady of Buon Consiglio in Genazzano. In 1894, he painted a triptych of the Adoration for the apse of the church of the Addolorata in Mosciano Sant'Angelo. He painted two large canvases: Funerals of Caesar and Cato departs from the Theater during Floralia (1900), now on exhibit in the Sala de Prensa Fray Camilo Henríquez, Biblioteca Nacional of Chile.
