= Patty Tucker =

American bridge player and teacher

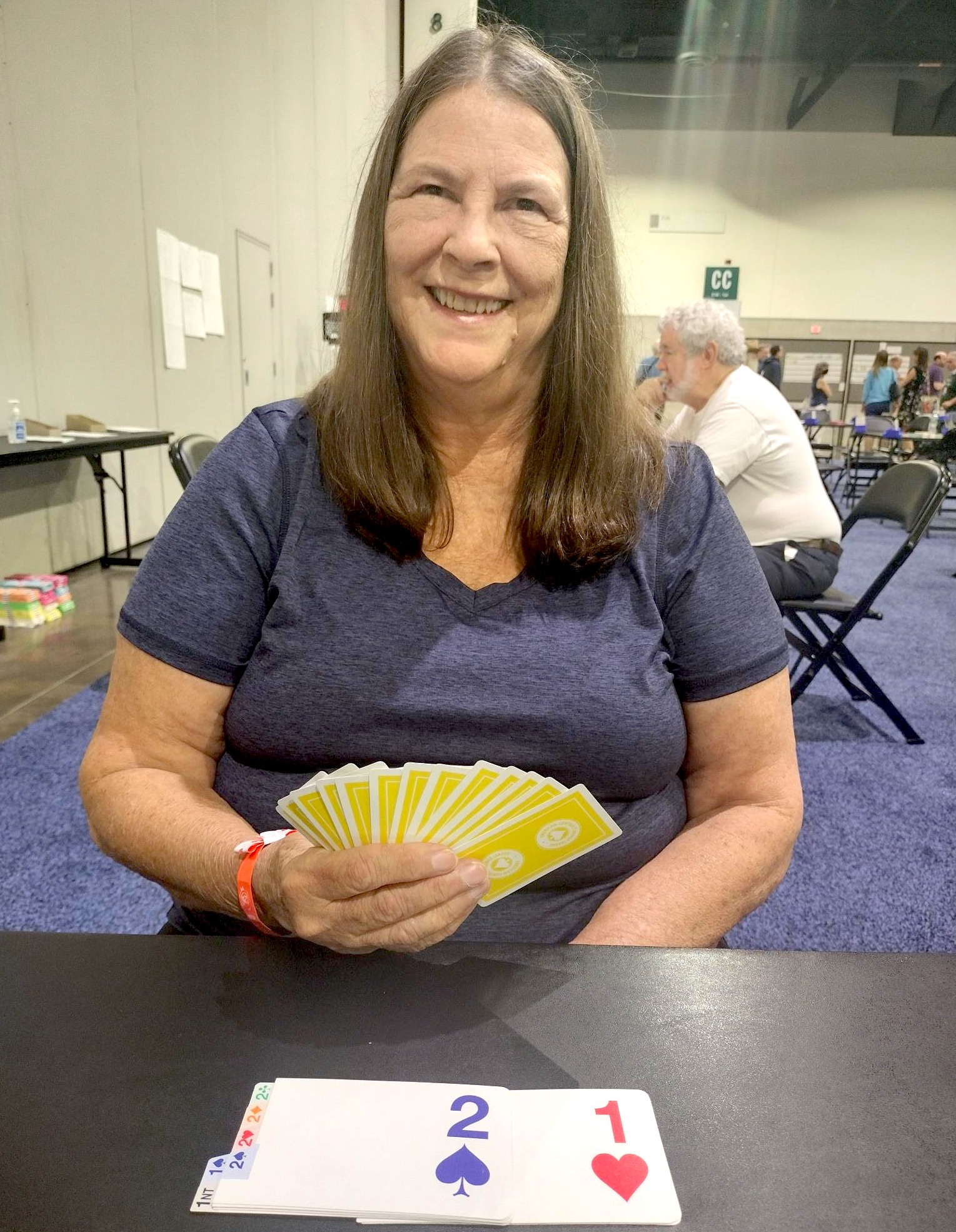
- Patty Tucker, Providence 2022
- Born: 1954 (age 71–72)

Patty Tucker (born 1954) is an American bridge player and teacher. In the world of competitive bridge, Tucker holds the honor and rank, American Contract Bridge League (ACBL) Grand Life Master. She also teaches duplicate bridge and is an author of 40+ bridge books and workbooks. The ACBL's Board of Directors named Patty the ”2016 Honorary Member of the Year" for her efforts in sustaining the game of bridge for future generations. Patty reflected, “I teach bridge for the immense satisfaction I get, in passing on to others, my knowledge, respect, and love for the game of bridge.”

== Bridge career ==
In 1999, Patty's lifelong interest in bridge turned into a full-time career. Patty is certified by the American Bridge Teachers’ Association, as a “Master Teacher” which is the highest designation in the North American bridge teachers' community. Patty served as president of the American Bridge Teachers’ Association (ABTA) during 2016–2017. In 2000, Patty and her long-time partner and husband, Kevin Collins, earned national recognition by winning “The North American Open Pairs National Bridge Championship.”

Patty co-founded Atlanta Junior Bridge in 2006 which then became the largest youth bridge program in the country.

As an American Contract Bridge League Grand Life Master earning over 10,000 Masterpoints, Patty is one of the few people in the world who hold both titles: Grand Life Master and Master Teacher.

== Bridge accomplishments ==
- 2019 ACBL Blackwood Award
- 2011 ACBL Goodwill Member of the Year
- 2016 ACBL Honorary Member of the Year Award
- 2011 Georgia Bridge Hall of Fame
- 2012 American Bridge Teachers' Association (ABTA) Book of the Year Award: Intermediate, co-author of Cuebidding 1 — Controls

=== Wins ===
- North American Bridge Championships (1)
  - North American Pairs (1) 2000
