= Patrick Gaffney =

Patrick Gaffney may refer to:

- Patrick Gaffney (Buddhist) (born 1949), English Buddhist teacher and editor
- Patrick Gaffney (politician) (died 1943), Irish Farmers' Party politician
- Patrick Gaffney (anthropologist) (born 1947), American anthropologist and Holy Cross priest
