= Patrick Degorce =

French hedge fund manager (born 1969)

- Born: 1969 (age 56–57)
- Occupation: Hedge fund manager
- Known for: Founder and CEO, Theleme Partners LLP

Patrick Degorce (born 1969) is a French hedge fund manager, and the founder and chief executive officer (CEO) of Theleme Partners LLP.

== Early life ==
Degorce has French nationality, and Swiss residence.

== Career ==
Degorce was an officer in the French Navy in his 20s, before switching to a career in financial services.

He worked for Merrill Lynch Investment Managers for seven years, rising to fund manager.

In 2003, Degorce was a co-founder, along with Chris Hohn, of The Children's Investment Fund Management (TCIF) hedge fund.

In 2007, Degorce wrote to the Dutch bank ABN AMRO calling for its break up, citing its unsuccessful cost-cutting plans. The letter and subsequent press attention ultimately led to its purchase by a consortium led by Royal Bank of Scotland, in what was at the time the world's largest bank takeover at US$98.3 billion.

In 2009, Degorce founded Theleme Partners LLP, a hedge fund based at 15 Davies Street, Mayfair, London, and is its CEO and CIO. Theleme is based in the same premises as hedge fund powerhouse Lansdowne Partners, with whom they share some back office functions.

Degorce was British Prime Minister Rishi Sunak's boss at the Children's Investment Fund Management and Theleme Partners.

In 2011, Degorce was one of the earliest investors in the pharmaceutical company Moderna (when they only had about ten employees), in the hope that they could help find a cure for his "high school sweetheart" wife, who had Stage IV lung cancer.

In October 2017, following hearings at lower courts, three judges at the Court of Appeal ruled in favour of HMRC in respect of a film financing tax avoidance scheme dating back to 2006–07, and Degorce was liable to pay tax of £7.5 million.

As of November 2017, Theleme Partners managed funds totalling US$2.8 billion.
