= Paddy Henderson (journalist) =

British athlete

Adam 'Paddy' Mark Henderson (born in 1996 in Clifton, Bristol) is a former Team GB athlete.

== Athletics career ==
Henderson began his athletics career in Cheltenham competing as a sprinter and a long jumper. In 2011, aged 14 he began competing in the Decathlon. 18 months later, he was crowned Under 17 English Decathlon Champion after a run of 11 gold medals in 11 national meetings in September 2012.

Henderson went on to compete for Team GB Juniors and Team GB in a number of domestic and international meets. He retired from athletics at 18 due to a reoccurring knee injury.

== Journalism career ==
As of 2016, Henderson is a part of the team at both BBC Sport and BBC News as a broadcaster and reporter.
