= Petti, Chabahar =

Petti پتي
- Village
- Location within Iran
- Coordinates: 25°41′03″N 60°57′24″E
- Country: Iran
- Province: Sistan and Baluchestan
- County: Chabahar
- Bakhsh: Central
- Rural District: Pir Sohrab

Population (2006)
  - Total: 348
- Time zone: UTC+3:30 (IRST)
  - Summer (DST): UTC+4:30 (IRDT)

Petti (Persian: پتي, also Romanized as Pettī) is a village in Pir Sohrab Rural District, in the Central District of Chabahar County, Sistan and Baluchestan Province, Iran. At the 2006 census, its population was 348, in 57 families.
