= Patrick Waldraff =

German politician (born 1987)

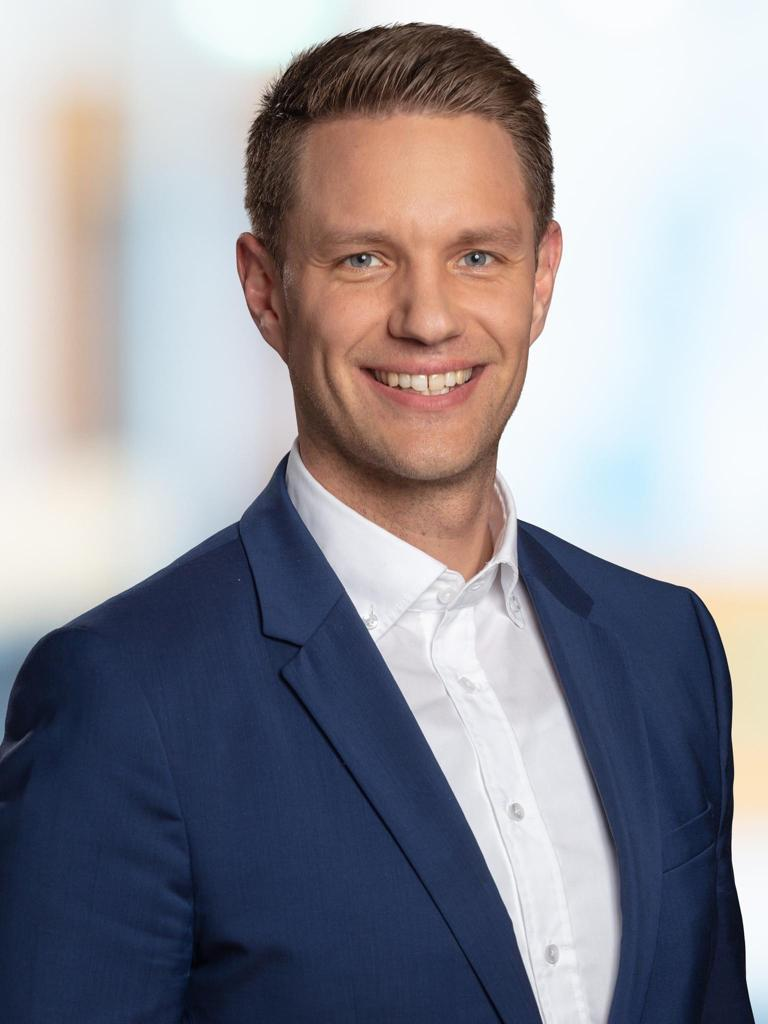
- Waldraff in 2023

Member of the Landtag of Saarland
- Incumbent
- Assumed office 25 April 2022
- Constituency: Saarlouis

Personal details
- Born: 3 August 1987 (age 39)
- Party: Christian Democratic Union

Patrick Waldraff (born 3 August 1987) is a German politician serving as a member of the Landtag of Saarland since 2022. He has served as chairman of the Internal Affairs Committee since 2025. From 2020 to 2022, he served as managing director of the Christian Democratic Union in Saarland.
