= Patricius =

Patricius may refer to:

== People ==
- Patricius (Caesar), a caesar of the Eastern Roman Empire
- Patricius (consul 500), prominent East Roman general and consul
- Patricius (jurist), 5th-century Roman jurist
- Patricius (usurper) (died 352), leader of the Jewish revolt against Gallus
- Patricius (fl. 354AD), father of Augustine of Hippo
- Saint Patrick, Christian missionary and patron saint of Ireland
- Franciscus Patricius (1529-1597), Croatian-Venetian Platonist philosopher and scientist

== Other uses ==
- Patricius (butterfly), a genus of gossamer-winged butterflies.
- Patrician (ancient Rome), a rank in the Roman Republic and in the Roman Empire
- Patrikios, a title in the Later Roman Empire

== See also ==
- Dinu Patriciu, Romanian businessman
- Patrician (disambiguation)
