= Patricio =

- Pronunciation: Spanish pronunciation: [paˈtɾiθjo] Latin American Spanish: [paˈtɾisjo] Portuguese pronunciation: [paˈtɾisiu]
- Gender: Male
- Language: Spanish, Portuguese

Origin
- Region of origin: Spain; Portugal

Other names
- Related names: Patrick, Patrizio

Patricio in Spanish, or Patrício in Portuguese, is a male given name equivalent to Patrick in English.

The Spanish name is pronounced with the stress on the same first i as Portuguese, but an accent is not needed because this follows normal rules for stress in Spanish.

Notable people with the name include:

== Given name ==
Spanish

- Patricio Arabolaza, (1893–1935), Spanish footballer
- Patricio Aylwin (1918–2016), Chilean politician
- Patricio Fontanet (born 1979), Argentine singer-songwriter
- Patricio Montojo, (1839–1917), Spanish admiral
- Patricio O'Ward (born 1999), Mexican race car driver

Portuguese

- Patrício Antônio Boques (born 1974), Brazilian footballer
- Patrício Freire (born 1987), Brazilian mixed martial artist known as Patrício Pitbull

== Surname ==
- Miguel Patricio (born 1966/1967), Portuguese businessman
- Rui Patrício (born 1988), Portuguese footballer
