= Patsy Foley =

Irish hurler

Personal information
- Native name: Padraig Ó Foghlú (Irish)
- Born: 1943 (age 82–83) Clara, County Kilkenny, Ireland
- Occupation: Roman Catholic priest

Sport
- Sport: Hurling
- Position: Left corner-forward
Club
- Years: Club
- Clara
Inter-county*
| Years | County | Apps (scores) |
| 1967 | Kilkenny | 2 (0-00) |
Inter-county titles
- Leinster titles: 1
- All-Irelands: 0
- NHL: 0
- *Inter County team apps and scores correct as of 22:11, 6 January 2014.

Patrick Foley (born 1943) is an Irish retired hurler who played as a left corner-forward for the Kilkenny senior team.

Born in Clara, County Kilkenny, Foley first played competitive hurling during his schooling at St. Kieran's College. He arrived on the inter-county scene at the age of seventeen when he first linked up with the Kilkenny minor team, before later joining the junior side. He made his senior debut during the 1967 championship. Foley immediately became a semi-regular member of the starting fifteen, and won one Leinster medal. He was also an All-Ireland medallist as a non-playing substitute.

At club level Foley played with Clara.

Throughout his career Foley made 2 championship appearances. He retired from inter-county hurling following the conclusion of the 1967 championship.

== Honours ==
=== Player ===
St. Kieran's College

- All-Ireland Colleges Senior Hurling Championship (2): 1959, 1961)
- Leinster Colleges Senior Hurling Championship (2): 1959, 1961

Kilkenny

- All-Ireland Senior Hurling Championship (2): 1967 (sub)
- Leinster Senior Hurling Championship (2): 1967
- All-Ireland Minor Hurling Championship (3): 1960 (sub), 1961

All-Ireland Minor Hurling Championship|1962]]

- Leinster Minor Hurling Championship (3): 1960 (sub), 1961
