= Patrizio =

Patrizio is an Italian male personal name. It is the Italian form of Patrick.

- Patrizio Bertelli (born 1946), Italian businessman
- Patrizio Bianchi (born 1952), Italian economist and politician
- Patrizio Buanne (born 1978), Italian baritone
- Patrizio Di Renzo (born 1971), Swiss photographer
- Patrizio Frau (born 1989), German-Italian footballer
- Patrizio Gambirasio (born 1961), Italian cyclist
- Patrizio Oliva (born 1959), Italian boxer
