= Patti Mayor =

English painter (1872–1962)

- Born: 1872
- Died: 1962 (aged 89–90)

Patti Mayor (born Martha Ann Mayor) was an artist born in Preston, England, in 1872. Mayor’s work predominantly takes the form of painted portraits, and she is known for her works’ particular focus on working class figures who were local to Preston. Her paintings are currently held in various galleries in the North West of England, including: Harris Museum and Art Gallery, Preston; Grundy Art Gallery, Blackpool; and Gallery Oldham, Greater Manchester.

== Early life ==
Patti Mayor grew up in Preston, in the North West of England. She attended the Slade School of Fine Art at University College London, which was one of the most prestigious British art schools at the time.

== Career ==
Following her time at the Slade School of Fine Art, Mayor returned to Preston where she focused her work around portraits of working class figures from her hometown. In particular, her paintings showed people in their work clothing, at work, and going about their everyday lives. Most of the sitters in her portraits are unnamed and remain unidentified.

== Political views ==
Mayor was a known suffragette. This is a stance that is demonstrated through her paintings that depict working women. One such painting, The Half-Timer, was carried at the Women’s Sunday suffragette march in London in 1908 as a representation of working women’s contributions to British society.

Additionally, Mayor had a friendship with Joseph Garstang, who was also from Preston. Garstang was a socialist, anti-conscriptionist and conscientious objector during World War I

== Legacy ==
Patti Mayor died in 1962, aged 90, having not married or had children. Her work, which she bequeathed to galleries in the North West of England, embodies the strong working class history and political movements that are part of the history of the area, while commemorating the figures that represent them. Her portraits also provide historical records of working-class people in the North of England during the years she was active, which was uncommon as portraits were often reserved for upper class women
