= Patryk Słotwiński =

Polish footballer

Personal information
- Date of birth: 27 April 1994 (age 32)
- Place of birth: Tomaszów Lubelski, Poland
- Height: 1.82 m (6 ft 0 in)
- Position: Defender

Team information
- Current team: Tomasovia Tomaszów Lubelski
- Number: 6

Youth career
- Tomasovia Tomaszów Lubelski

Senior career*
Years	Team	Apps	(Gls)
2009–2013	Tomasovia Tomaszów Lubelski	102	(7)
2014	Stal Mielec	11	(0)
2014–2015	Tomasovia Tomaszów Lubelski	30	(6)
2015–2016	Wisła Puławy	28	(0)
2017–2018	Motor Lublin	50	(2)
2019–2020	Hetman Zamość	24	(1)
2020–	Tomasovia Tomaszów Lubelski	9	(0)
- * Club domestic league appearances and goals as of 20 September 2020

Patryk Słotwiński (born 27 April 1994) is a Polish footballer who plays as a defender for Tomasovia Tomaszów Lubelski. He has previously played for Stal Mielec, Wisła Puławy, Motor Lublin, and Hetman Zamość.

== Career ==
Słotwiński began his career at Tomasovia Tomaszów Lubelski. In February 2014, he signed for II liga club Stal Mielec, and he made his professional debut on 9 March 2014 in a 1–3 home loss against Legionovia Legionowo, coming on as a substitute in the 62nd minute.

On 23 July 2015, it was announced that Słotwiński had signed with I liga side Wisła Puławy. His debut for Wisła came two days later, where he scored goal in Polish Cup tie against Zagłębie Sosnowiec.

On 19 January 2017, Słotwiński signed a one-and-a-half-year contract with Motor Lublin. On 12 July 2018, he signed a new one-year deal with Motor, keeping him at the club until the end of the 2018–19 season. On 11 December 2018, his contract was terminated by mutual agreement.

In January 2019, he signed a contract with Hetman Zamość until the end of the 2018–19 season.
