= Patrick Campbell (academic) =

English academic

Patrick Anthony Charles Campbell (born 1935) is a retired English academic and journalist whose work includes literary criticism, performance studies, and environmental writing.

He has authored and edited academic books, as well as works of fiction and nonfiction.

== Early life and career ==
Campbell was born in 1935 in Upton-on-Severn, Worcestershire, England. He attended King's School, Worcester, after initial education at a local primary school. He later studied English, History, and Education at the University College of North Staffordshire. Campbell taught in the English Department at the University of British Columbia between 1957 and 1960, where he completed a master's degree focused on the novels of George Eliot. After returning to England, he taught in secondary and further education before joining Trent Park College of Education in 1962 as a senior lecturer in English and Education. He received a doctorate from the University of London in 1970 for a dissertation on the early poetry of Alfred, Lord Tennyson. Campbell later became Principal Lecturer and Head of department.

Following institutional restructuring, Trent Park College became part of Middlesex Polytechnic and later Middlesex University. During this period, Campbell was involved in the development of postgraduate programmes in performance studies and served as Academic Chair of a master's degree in Performing Arts. He also held visiting academic professorships at the University of Northern Colorado (1979–1980) and at the University of British Columbia during the 1990s. In addition to teaching, Campbell authored and edited several academic publications on Romantic poetry, war poetry, and performance studies.

== Later writing ==
After retiring from academic work in 2003, Campbell relocated to Thailand. He wrote articles on gardening, natural history, and the environment for regional publications in Phuket and occasionally for national newspapers, including the Bangkok Post.

== Selected works ==
=== Academic ===
- Wordsworth and Coleridge: Lyrical Ballads – Critical Perspectives (Macmillan, 1991)
- Analysing Performance: A Critical Reader (Manchester University Press, 1996)
- Siegfried Sassoon: A Study of the War Poetry (McFarland, 1999)
- Psychoanalysis and Performance (with Adrian Kear; Routledge, 2001)

=== Nonfiction ===
- Trent Park: A History (Middlesex University Press, 1997)
- Plums to Persia: A Worcestershire Childhood Revisited (Aspect Design, 2015)
- Phuket Days: Life in the Island Fast Lane (White Lotus, 2017)
- The Tropic Gardener: Guide to Tropical Plants and Their Cultivation (White Lotus, 2021)
- Changing Places (Aspect Design, 2025)

=== Fiction ===
- Swings and Arrows: A Rake’s Chronicle (Amazon, 2021)
