= Patrick McGuinness Three-Decker =

- U.S. National Register of Historic Places
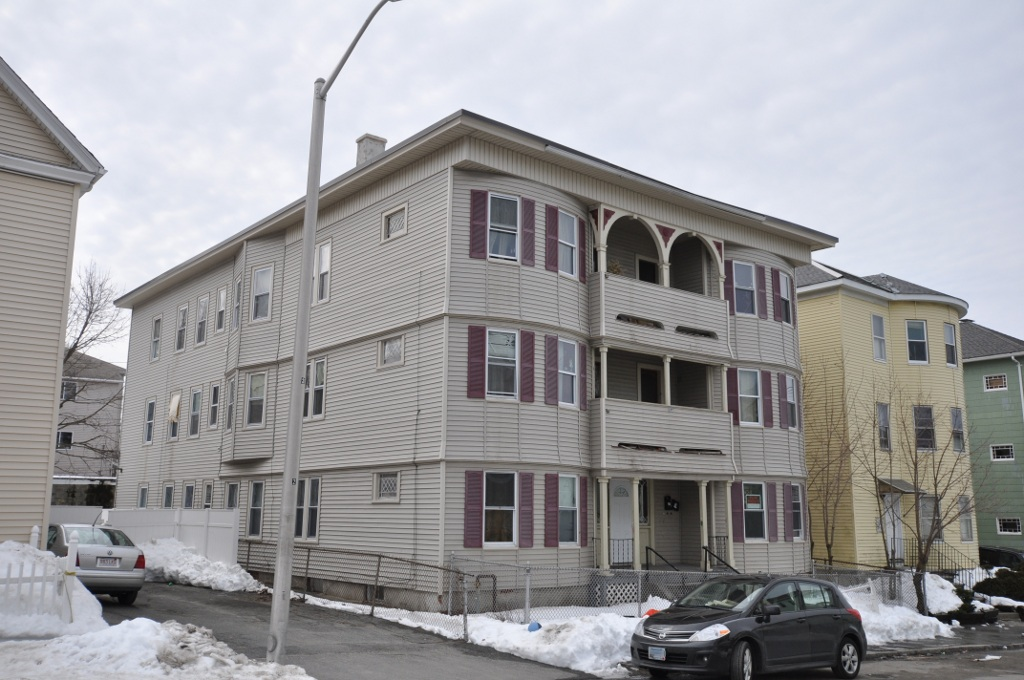

- Location within Massachusetts Location within the United States
- Location: 25 Suffield St., Worcester, Massachusetts
- Coordinates: 42°14′59″N 71°47′50″W
- Area: less than one acre
- Built: c. 1908
- Architectural style: Colonial Revival
- MPS: Worcester Three-Deckers TR
- NRHP reference No.: 89002439
- Added to NRHP: February 9, 1990

The Patrick McGuinness Three-Decker is a historic triple decker in Worcester, Massachusetts. It was built c. 1908, and is a rare well-preserved example of a double triple-decker (housing six units) with Colonial Revival styling. The house was listed on the National Register of Historic Places in 1990.

== Description and history ==
The Patrick McGuiness Three-Decker is located in Worcester's southeastern Vernon Hill neighborhood, on the south side of Suffield Street east of Perry Avenue. It is a three-story wood-frame structure, basically built as a pair of adjacent mirror-image triple deckers. The building has a central recessed porch area where each level has a slightly different treatment: the first level has full-length turned columns, the second level has half-height columns above a shingled balustrade, and the third level has arch-forming brackets resting on short piers. The bays flanking the porch area are rounded, with two sash windows. There were originally jigsawn brackets in the main roof eave, but these have been apparently been lost (see photo).

The house was built about 1908, when the lower western portion of Vernon Hill was being densely developed with triple deckers as a working-class residential area. Patrick McGuiness, its first owner, was an absentee landlord, who rented the units to Irish and Scandinavian immigrants. By the 1920s, the area had become more mixed, with tenants of Polish and Lithuanian extraction.

== See also ==
- National Register of Historic Places listings in eastern Worcester, Massachusetts
