= Petti Mohammad Jadgal =

Petti Mohammad Jadgal پتي محمد جدگال
- Village
- Country: Iran
- Province: Sistan and Baluchestan
- County: Chabahar
- Bakhsh: Central
- Rural District: Pir Sohrab

Population (2006)
  - Total: 40
- Time zone: UTC+3:30 (IRST)
  - Summer (DST): UTC+4:30 (IRDT)

Petti Mohammad Jadgal (Persian: پتي محمد جدگال, also Romanized as Pettī Moḩammad Jadgāl) is a village in Pir Sohrab Rural District, in the Central District of Chabahar County, Sistan and Baluchestan Province, Iran. At the 2006 census, its population was 40, in 8 families.
