= Pata, Samoa =

Samoan island

Coordinates: 13°55′S 172°01′W

Pata is a village on the island of Upolu in Samoa. It is in the political district of A'ana.

The population is 487.
