= Patryk Królczyk =

Polish footballer

Personal information
- Date of birth: 10 May 1994 (age 32)
- Place of birth: Rydułtowy, Poland
- Height: 1.86 m (6 ft 1 in)
- Position: Goalkeeper

Team information
- Current team: Macomerese Calcio

Youth career
- –2011: WSP Wodzisław
- 2011–2013: Augsburg

Senior career*
Years	Team	Apps	(Gls)
2012–2013	Augsburg II	2	(0)
2013–2014	Nadwiślan Góra	4	(0)
2014–2015	Poroniec Poronin	18	(0)
2015–2018	Olimpia Grudziądz	10	(0)
2018	Pniówek 74 Pawłowice	2	(0)
2018–2019	Warta Gorzów	16	(0)
2019–2022	Piast Gliwice	0	(0)
2021–2022	→ GKS Katowice (loan)	9	(0)
2022	Hutnik Kraków	4	(0)
2023	Gran Tarajal	10	(0)
2023–2024	Caudal Deportivo	29	(0)
2024–2025	Valdepeñas		
2025	Viveiro	6	(0)
2025	Odra Wodzisław Śląski	7	(0)
2025–	Macomerese Calcio		
- * Club domestic league appearances and goals as of 14:23, 23 June 2025 (UTC)

Patryk Królczyk (born 10 May 1994) is a Polish professional footballer who plays as a goalkeeper for Italian club Macomerese Calcio.

== Career ==
For the second half of the 2013–14 season, Królczyk left the reserves of German Bundesliga side Augsburg and signed for III liga club Nadwiślan Góra.

In 2019, he joined Ekstraklasa side Piast Gliwice from Warta Gorzów Wielkopolski.

== Honours ==
Nadwiślan Góra

- III liga Opole–Silesia South: 2013–14
