= Patrick Reilly (disambiguation) =

Patrick Reilly (1909–1999) was a British diplomat.

Patrick Reilly may also refer to:

- Paddy Reilly (born 1939), Irish folk singer and guitarist
- Paddy Reilly (Gaelic footballer), Gaelic football player
- Paddy Reilly (soccer player), Irish soccer player at the 1924 Olympic Games
- Pat Reilly (1873–1937), Scottish football manager
- Patrick Reilly (baseball) (born 2001), American baseball player

== See also ==
- Percy French (1854–1920), who wrote the song Come Back, Paddy Reilly, to Ballyjamesduff (1912)
- Patrick Riley (disambiguation)
