= Patta =

Patta may refer to:

- Debora Patta (born 1964), South African journalist
- Henry Patta (born 1987), Ecuadorian footballer
- Patta Sisodia, commander of Chittor in the Siege of Chittorgarh
- Pata (sword) (also spelled "patta"), an Indian sword
- Patta (land deed), a land deed in South Asia

== See also ==
- Pata (disambiguation)
- Patta Fort, a ruined fort in Maharashtra, India
