= Patrick Russell =

Patrick Russell may refer to:

- Patrick Russell (bishop) (1629–1692), Irish Roman Catholic archbishop of Dublin
- Patrick Russell (herpetologist) (1726–1805), Scottish surgeon and naturalist who worked in India
- Sir Patrick Russell (judge) (1926–2002), English High Court judge and a member of the Privy Council
- Patrick Russell (ice hockey) (born 1993), Danish ice hockey forward

== See also ==
- Patrick Russel, French alpine ski racer
- Patrick Russill, English choral conductor and professor of organ
