= Patrick Harvey =

Patrick Harvey may refer to:

- Patrick Harvey (actor) (born 1984), Irish-Australian actor
- Patrick Harvey (pentathlete) (born 1935), British modern pentathlete
- Patrick Harvey (rugby union, born 1925) rugby union player who represented Australia
- Patrick Harvey (rugby union, born 1880) (1880–1949), rugby union player who represented New Zealand

== See also ==
- Patrick Harvie (born 1973), Scottish politician
