= Patrick E. Crago =

American medical researcher

Patrick E. Crago is the Allen H. and Constance T. Ford Professor and Chairman of Biomedical Engineering at Case Western Reserve University in Cleveland, Ohio. Crago is a biomedical engineer working as a Principal Investigator at the Cleveland FES Center.

== Academic achievements ==
Patrick Crago received the B.S.E.E. from Carnegie-Mellon University in 1967, and the M.S. and Ph.D. in biomedical engineering from Case Western Reserve University, in 1970 and 1973 respectively, followed by post-doctoral studies in neuromuscular physiology at Johns Hopkins University.

He returned to Case as a Senior Research Associate in 1976. He served as acting co-director for the Applied Neural Control Laboratory (currently Neural Engineering Center) at Case Western Reserve University from 1977 to 1978. He joined the BME faculty in 1982. In 1985, he received an appointment as a Biomedical Engineer at the Cleveland VA Medical Center. In 1996, Dr. Crago served as an organizer for the Engineering Foundation Conference in Biomechanics and Neural Control of Movement. He was a member of the NIH-NICHD Subcommittee on Medical Rehabilitation Research from 1996 to 2000, for which he served as chairman from 2000 to 2001. In 1999 he was appointed the Allen H. and Constance T. Ford Professor of Biomedical Engineering, and chairman of the department. He served as co-director of the NSF IGERT on Neuromechanical Systems at Case Western Reserve University from 2000-2003. He served as BioDirector for The Institute for Management and Engineering (TiME) at Case Western Reserve University in 2002, and received an appointment as associate staff at the Cleveland Clinic Foundation in 2003. He was part of the steering committee for the five-year plan for NIDRR from 2003 to 2004. From 2004 to 2005 Prof. Crago was the chairperson for the Council of chairs of Programs in Bioengineering and Biomedical Engineering. He currently serves in the Policy Committee for the MSTP Program at Case Western Reserve University.

Crago received fellowship awards from the American Institute of Medical and Biological Engineering and from the Biomedical Engineering Society in 2000 and 2005, respectively.

== Research interests ==
His research interests are in the area of movement control and regulation of posture, particularly the restoration of movement by neuroprostheses employing neuromuscular stimulation.

== Professional memberships ==
Crago is a member of the Society for Neuroscience, American Society for Biomechanics, IEEE/Engineering in Medicine and Biology Society, International FES Society, American Association for the Advancement of Science, American Society for Engineering Education, and Biomedical Engineering Society.

== Selected publications ==
- Giuffrida, J.P. and Crago, P.E., “Functional restoration of elbow extension after spinal cord injury using a neural network based synergistic FES controller”, IEEE Trans. Neural Systs. and Rehab. Eng., 13:147-152, 2005.
- Swift MJ, Crago PE, Grill WM. Applied electric fields accelerate the diffusion rate and increase the diffusion distance of DiI in fixed tissue, J. Neurosci. Meth., 141:155-63, 2005
- Sutton GP, Mangan EV, Neustadter DM, Beer RD, Crago PE, Chiel HJ, Neural control exploits changing mechanical advantage and context dependence to generate different feeding responses in Aplysia. Biological Cybernetics 91, 333-345, 2004.
- Sutton GP, Macknin JB, Gartman SS, Sunny GP, Beer RD, Crago PE, Chiel HJ, Passive properties within the feeding apparatus of Aplysia aid retraction in biting but not in swallowing. Journal of Comparative Physiology A, 190:501-514, 2004.
- Perreault, E.J., Kirsch, R.F., and Crago, P.E. " Multijoint dynamics and postural stability of the human arm”, Exp Brain Res., 157:507-1, 2004.
- Lujan, J.L. and Crago, P.E., “Computer-based test-bed for clinical assessment of neuroprosthesis controllers using artificial neural networks”, Med Biol Eng Comput, 42:754-61, 2004.
- Memberg, W.D. and Crago, P.E., Keith, M.K, “Restoration of elbow extension by FES in individuals with tetraplegia”, J. Rehab. Res. & Devel. 40:477-486, 2003.
- Drushel, RF, Sutton, GP, Neustadter, DM, Mangan, EV, Adams, BW, Crago, PE, and Chiel, HJ. Radula-centric and Odontophore-centric Kinematic Models of Swallowing in Aplysia californica, J. Exp. Biol., 205:2029-2051, 2002.
- Neustadter, D.M., Drushel, R.F., Crago, P.E., Adams, B.W, and Chiel, H.J., “A kinematic model of swallowing in Aplysia californica based on radula/odontophore kinematics and in vivo MRI”, J. Exp. Biol. 205:3177-3205, 2002.
- Perreault, E.J., Kirsch, R.F. and Crago, P.E., "Voluntary control of static endpoint stiffness during force regulation tasks", J. Neurophysiol., 87:2808-2816, 2002.
- Lin, C.C.K. and Crago, P.E., “Neural and mechanical contributions to the stretch reflex: A model synthesis”, Annals of Biomedical Engineering, 30:54-67, 2002.
- Lin, C.C.K..and Crago, P.E., “A structural model of the muscle spindle”, Annals of Biomedical Engineering, 30:68-83, 2002.
- Perreault, E.J., Kirsch, R.F., and Crago, P.E. "Effects of voluntary force generation on the elastic components of endpoint stiffness", Exp. Brain Res., 141:312-323, 2001.
- Perreault, E.J., Kirsch, R.F. and Crago, P.E., "Postural Arm Control Following Cervical Spinal Cord Injury", IEEE Trans. Neural Systems and Rehab. Eng., 9:369-77, 2001.
- Giuffrida, J.P. and Crago, P.E., "Reciprocal EMG control of elbow extension by FES", IEEE Trans. Neural Systems and Rehab. Eng., 9:338-345, 2001.
