= Pat Doherty (boxer) =

English boxer

Personal information
- Nationality: English
- Born: Patrick P. M. Doherty; 12 April 1962 (age 64) Croydon, England
- Height: 5 ft 5 in (1.65 m)
- Weight: feather/super feather/lightweight

Boxing career

Boxing record
- Total fights: 32
- Wins: 18 (KO 15)
- Losses: 11 (KO 6)
- Draws: 3

Patrick P. M. "Pat" Doherty (born 12 April 1962) born in Croydon is an English former professional feather/super feather/lightweight boxer of the 1980s, who won the Irish super featherweight title, and Commonwealth lightweight title, and was a challenger for the British Boxing Board of Control (BBBofC) Southern Area featherweight title against Clyde Ruan , and BBBofC British super featherweight title against John Doherty, his professional fighting weight varied from 122 1/2 lb (55.6 kg; 8 st 10.5 lb), i.e. featherweight to 134 3/4 lb (61.1 kg; 9 st 8.8 lb), i.e. lightweight.
