= Pádraig =

- Gender: Male

Origin
- Origin: Irish
- Meaning: Noble
- Region of origin: Ireland

Other names
- Variant forms: Pádhraig, Pádraic, Pá(dh)raic, Padraigh, Páiric
- Related names: Patrick

Pádraig or Pádraic (English: /ˈpɔː(d)rɪɡ, -rɪk/ PAW-(d)rig, -rik, Irish: [ˈpˠaːd̪ˠɾˠəɟ, -əc]), also Pádhraig or Pádhraic (/ˈpɔːrɪɡ, -rɪk/ PAW-rig, -rik, Irish: [ˈpˠaːɾˠəɟ, -əc]), are Irish male given names deriving from the Latin Patricius, meaning "of the patrician class", introduced via the name of Saint Patrick. The name is often anglicised as its English language equivalent Patrick or phonetically, e.g. Pauric.

Diminutives include Páidín, Páidí (both anglicised as 'Paudeen' and 'Paddy', respectively), and the feminine equivalent Pádraigín (little Patrick), which was originally an exclusively masculine name before later being viewed as the Irish equivalent of the feminine name Patricia. Pádraig is also sometimes anglicised as Paddy or Podge; the former anglicisation is often used, sometimes pejoratively, as a term for Irish people as a whole.

The Scottish Gaelic forms are Pàdraig (Scottish Gaelic pronunciation: [ˈpʰaːt̪ɾɪkʲ]) or Pàra (Scottish Gaelic pronunciation: [ˈpʰaːɾə]) for short (cf. Para Handy).

== Notable people ==
- Liam Pádraic Aiken (born 1990), American actor
- Pádraig Amond (born 1988), Irish footballer
- Pádraig de Brún (1889–1960), Irish clergyman, mathematician and classical scholar
- Pádraig Clancy, Gaelic football player from County Laois in Ireland
- Padraic Colum (1881–1972), author
- Pádraig Phiarais Cúndún (1777–1857), Irish poet
- Pádraic Delaney (born 1977), Irish actor
- Pádraig Duggan (born Pádraig Ó Dúgáin, 1949–2016), Irish musician
- Padraic Fallon (1905–1974), Irish poet
- Pádraig Faulkner (1918–2012), Irish politician
- Pádraig Flynn (born 1939), Irish politician
- Pádraig Harrington (born 1971), professional golfer
- Pádraig Horan (born 1950), Irish hurler
- Pádraig Hughes, Gaelic football referee
- Pádraic Mahony (born 1992), Irish hurler
- Pádraic McCormack (born 1942), Irish politician
- Pádraic McMahon, musician in the band The Thrills
- Pádraig Ó Snodaigh (1935–2025), Irish language activist, poet, writer and publisher
- Padraig Parkinson, Irish professional poker player
- Pádraic Pearse (1879–1916), Irish activist/revolutionary (also known as Patrick Henry Pearse or Pádraig Pearse)

== See also ==
- All pages beginning with Padraic or Padraig
- All pages beginning with Pádraic or Pádraig
- List of Irish-language given names
- List of Scottish Gaelic given names
