= Pattie =

Pattie may refer to:

== Food ==
- Savoury pattie, a fried mashed potato dish from Hull in England
- York Peppermint Pattie, a chocolate confectionery

== People ==
=== Given name ===
- Pattie Boyd (born 1944), English model, photographer and author
- Pattie Brooks (born 1943), American singer
- Pattie Coldwell (1952–2002), British TV presenter and journalist
- Pattie Deakin (1863–1934), wife of Australian Prime Minister Alfred Deakin
- Pattie Howard, American gospel and R&B singer
- Pattie Mallette (born 1975), Canadian author and film producer
- Pattie Menzies (1899–1995), wife of Australian Prime Minister Sir Robert Menzies
- Pattie Obey, American Jazz dance choreographer
- Little Pattie (born 1949), Australian singer

=== Surname ===
- Brian Pattie (born 1975), American auto-racing crew chief
- Geoffrey Pattie (1936–2024), British Conservative politician and Member of Parliament
- James Ohio Pattie (c. 1804–1851), American frontiersman and author

== Other uses ==
- Dame Pattie, International 12-metre class racing yacht

== See also ==
- Patty (disambiguation)
- Patti (disambiguation)
- Patricia
