= Patrice Baldwin =

Chair of the Council for Subject Associations in the United Kingdom

Patrice Baldwin FRSA
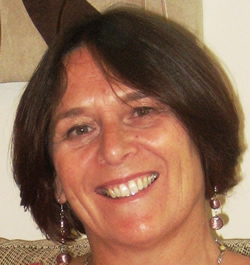
- Occupation: Theatre educator
- Known for: Drama for Learning

Patrice Baldwin is a British businessperson who is Chair of the Council for Subject Associations in the United Kingdom. She was President of the International Drama and Theatre Education Association (IDEA) from 2010 to 2013. She was Chair of National Drama, the UK’s leading professional subject association for UK drama and theatre educators. She is the Director of D4LC (Drama for Learning and Creativity).

== Career ==
Baldwin was a primary school headteacher for eleven years. She was an Ofsted inspector and a School Improvement Partner. For several years she worked as a BBC series consultant and scriptwriter for Let's Make a Story and also wrote scripts for First Steps in Drama and stories and dramatisations for Together, a BBC radio assembly programme for primary schools. From April 2000 to June 2011, she was the local authority arts adviser for Norfolk County Council Children's Services but decided to go freelance in June 2011. This enabled her to devote more time to working internationally and to developing 'Drama for Learning' in the UK.

Baldwin created Drama for Learning and Creativity (D4LC), a national school improvement initiative that was piloted in Norfolk in 2005 and was supported by the Qualifications and Curriculum Authority, Creative Partnerships and the National Endowment for Science, Technology and the Arts as well as Norfolk County Council and National Drama. She presented it at UNESCO's 2nd International Arts Education Conference in South Korea and in Taiwan and Newcastle at World Creativity Summits.

In April 2011, she became freelance, in order to focus more freely on her international work.

Baldwin was Chair of National Drama for more than a decade until November 2014 and was President of the International Drama Theatre and Education Association (IDEA) from 2010 to 2013. She has been an Executive Council Member of the World Alliance for Arts Education (WAAE).

During the COVID pandemic, she was Oak National Academy's Subject Leader for Primary Drama and also delivered online training sessions for drama and theatre organisations in Australia, India, Turkey and New Zealand, as well as regular online sessions through National Drama (UK). In July 2022, she delivered workshops in Iceland, at IDEA's 9th World Congress.

== Books ==
- Baldwin, Patrice (1991). Stimulating Drama: Cross Curricular Approaches to Drama in the Primary School. Norwich County Council.
- Baldwin, Patrice; Hendy, Lesley (1994). Drama Box: An Active Approach to Learning. Collins Educational.
- Baldwin, Patrice; Fleming, Kate (2002). Teaching Literacy through Drama: Creative Approaches. Routledge. ASIN 0415255783.
- Baldwin, Patrice (2008). The Primary Drama Handbook. Sage.
- Baldwin, Patrice (3 December 2009). Improving Your School Through Drama: A Creative Whole Class, Whole School Approach. Continuum International Publishing Group Ltd.
- Baldwin, Patrice; Neelands, Jonothan (2012). With Drama in Mind: Real Learning in Imagined Worlds. Continuum Publishing Corporation. ASIN 0826445888.
- Baldwin, Patrice; John, Rob (2012). Inspiring Writing Through Drama. Continuum Books. ISBN 9781441159090.
- Baldwin, Patrice; Galazka, Alicja (2021). Process Drama for Second Language Teaching and Learning: A Toolkit for Developing Language and Life Skills: Bloomsbury Guidebooks for Language Teachers. Bloomsbury Academic.
