= Padehi, Sistan and Baluchestan =

Padehi پده اي
- Village
- Location within Iran
- Coordinates: 31°14′26″N 61°44′15″E
- Country: Iran
- Province: Sistan and Baluchestan
- County: Hirmand
- Bakhsh: Qorqori
- Rural District: Qorqori

Population (2006)
  - Total: 130
- Time zone: UTC+3:30 (IRST)
  - Summer (DST): UTC+4:30 (IRDT)

Padehi (Persian: پده اي, also Romanized as Padeh’ī and Padehī; also known as Padai, Padā’ī, Padegī, and Padī) is a village in Qorqori Rural District, Qorqori District, Hirmand County, Sistan and Baluchestan Province, Iran. At the 2006 census, its population was 130, in 33 families.
