= Patrick J. Denard =

Shoulder surgeon and researcher

Patrick J. Denard is an American orthopedic surgeon and researcher. He is the founder and director of the Oregon Shoulder Institute in Medford, Oregon and is recognized for his contributions to arthroscopic shoulder surgery and shoulder arthroplasty. He is a Clinical Associate Professor in the Department of Medical Education and Clinical Sciences at Washington State University and founder of the Oregon Shoulder Fellowship. He has written over 300 peer-reviewed publications and more than 40 book chapters on the topic and is recognized as a top 1% orthopedic surgery researcher in the United States.

== Early life and education ==
Denard was born in Portland, Oregon and raised in The Dalles, Oregon. He graduated from the University of Puget Sound where he was named GTE Academic All-District for football. He received his medical degree from Geisel School of Medicine and completed his orthopedic surgery residency at Oregon Health and Science University in Portland, Oregon.

== Career ==
After his residency, Denard completed two fellowships, training in advanced shoulder arthroscopy under Stephen S. Burkhart at The San Antonio Orthopaedic Group and subsequently training in shoulder arthroplasty under Gilles Walch in Lyon, France.

Denard founded the Oregon Shoulder Institute in Medford, Oregon. He holds academic appointments as Clinical Associate Professor in the Department of Medical Education and Clinical Sciences at Washington State University and as an Instructor at Oregon Health & Science University. He also founded the Oregon Shoulder Fellowship which holds formal recognition from the American Shoulder and Elbow Surgeons.

Denard has performed over 9,000 shoulder surgeries, focusing on minimally invasive arthroscopic techniques. He has also developed techniques in arthroscopic rotator cuff repair, subscapularis repair, and the remplissage procedure for shoulder instability, and has contributed to the adoption of stemless anatomic total shoulder arthroplasty in North America. He also directs a virtual surgical fellowship program through VSURGIC, providing training to orthopedic surgeons internationally. In 2023, the National Library of Medicine's Expertscape ranked Denard seventh in the world for rotator cuff repair expertise and fourteenth in the world for shoulder replacement expertise, based on peer-reviewed research output.

Beginning in 2005, Denard's has written over 300 peer-reviewed publications and more than 40 book chapters which includes his research on topics such as rotator cuff repair, shoulder instability, shoulder arthroplasty, and arthroscopic technique. Avant-garde Health, which evaluates research output based on quantity and quality of published work, has recognized Denard among the top 1% of orthopedic surgery researchers in the United States. His research and earned him numerous awards and recognition, including the Robert H. Cofield MD Award for Best Oral Presentation and the SECEC Grammont Award at the Annual Congress of the European Society for Surgery of the Shoulder and Elbow. Denard has advised against people doing the overhead press due to strain on the shoulders.

=== Select publications ===
- The Cowboy's Companion: A Trail Guide for the Arthroscopic Shoulder Surgeon (co-authored with Stephen S. Burkhart, Ian K.Y. Lo, and Paul C. Brady; LWW, 2012)
- The Cowboy's Conundrum: Complex and Advanced Cases in Shoulder Arthroscopy (co-authored with Stephen S. Burkhart and Paul C. Brady; LWW, 2017)
- Shoulder Arthroplasty: Principles and Practice (contributing author; edited by Joseph D. Zuckerman; Wolters Kluwer)
- Surgical Techniques of the Shoulder, Elbow, and Knee in Sports Medicine, 3rd Edition (contributing author; edited by Brian Cole; Elsevier)
