= Pat O'Doherty =

Australian rugby league footballer

Personal information
- Full name: Patrick O'Doherty
- Born: 20 February 1966 (age 60) Ipswich, Queensland, Australia

Playing information
- Position: Prop
Club
Years	Team	Pld	T	G	FG	P
1986–87	Fulham RLFC	19	7	0	0	28
1989–90	Western Suburbs	35	1	11	0	26
1991	Gold Coast	7	0	0	0	0
1992	Parramatta Eels	6	0	0	0	0
	Total	67	8	11	0	54
- Source: As of 11 December 2023

Pat O'Doherty (born 20 February 1966) is an Australian former professional rugby league footballer who played in the 1980s and 1990s for the Western Suburbs Magpies, Parramatta Eels and Gold Coast Seagulls.

== Early life ==
Born and raised in Ipswich, O'Doherty's brothers Bill, Donald and Bernard and Hugh all played for Valleys in the Brisbane Rugby League premiership. Hugh also played two matches for Queensland.

== Club career ==
An Ipswich junior, O'Doherty was in the first-grade squad with the Ipswich Jets as early as 1986, playing under coach Tommy Raudonikis alongside players like Allan Langer and Kevin Walters.

After moving to Sydney to play in the New South Wales Rugby League, O'Doherty made his first-grade debut with the Western Suburbs Magpies in 1989. He played in the club’s first four games of the year, all losses. He returned to first-grade in round 12 and remained in the starting team for the rest of the season. At one time, he undertook the team’s goal-kicking duties, making 11 conversions from 15 attempts.

O'Doherty was sent from the field in a game against Penrith in 1990 following an on-field brawl. O'Doherty pleaded his innocence, saying, "I didn't throw a punch, I didn't throw anything. I said to Chris Mortimer, 'Let's keep out of this because it's the last game.’ The next thing I know I'm an instigator and off the field."

In 1990, O'Doherty played in a career-best 20 games, scoring his sole career try in the round 16 match against the Brisbane Broncos. Moments after scoring, his try was overshadowed by O’Doherty performing what is highly regarded by fans as one of the greatest dives in rugby league history when Bronco Gene Miles merely brushed past him in the in-goal and O’Doherty dramatically flopped to the ground like he'd been shot by an exocet missile.

However, with the arrival of new coach Warren Ryan and an influx of new players to Wests in 1991, O'Doherty signed a contract with the Gold Coast Seagulls. He stayed one season with them, playing in seven games as the club finished last on the table, claiming the wooden spoon. He was named as a member of the preliminary train-on squad for the Queensland State of Origin side that year, but was not called upon to play any part in the series itself.

O'Doherty spent one more season in first-grade, playing six games with the Parramatta Eels in 1992, mostly from the bench. In 1993, he was playing in a competition in Perth.

== Coaching ==
From 1998 to 2002, O'Doherty was an assistant to coach Bob Lindner at Brothers.

In 2004, he was captain-coaching Lower Clarence in the Group 1 competition.

Brother Hugh was joint-coach with O'Doherty at Valleys Diehards when they returned to the BRL competition in 2015. O'Doherty said, "I've always loved Valleys. I used to go into the dressing room as a four-year-old when Hugh was playing. When we went to church the nuns would give us updates on the scores if Valleys were playing. It was a sad day when Valleys got relegated."

== Footnotes ==
- Whiticker, Alan and Hudson, Glen; The Encyclopedia of Rugby League Players; published 2005 by BAS publishing, f16/171 Collins St, Melbourne, Vic., 3000
