= Patty (surname) =

Patty is a surname. Notable people with the surname include:

- Budge Patty (1924–2021), American tennis player
- Inna Mariam Patty (born 1983), Ghanaian social entrepreneur
- John W. Patty, American political scientist
- Kenneth Cartwright Patty (1891–1967), American lawyer
- Lidia Patty (born 1969), Bolivian politician and trade unionist
- R. Bruce Patty (1935–1998), American architect
- Sandi Patty (born 1956), American Contemporary Christian music singer
