= Patricia =

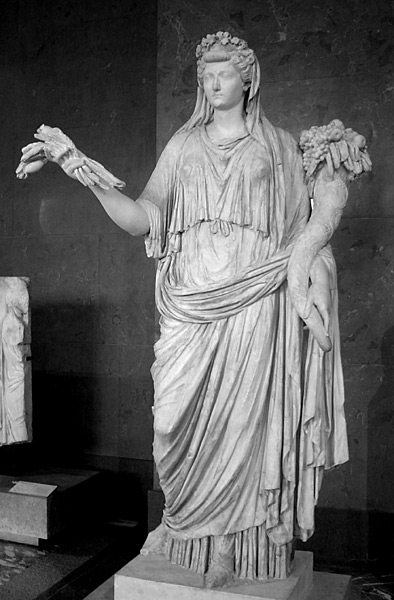
- Roman empress Livia was a patrician
- Pronunciation: /pəˈtrɪʃə/ pə-TRISH-ə, US also /pəˈtriːʃə/ pə-TREE-shə
- Gender: Female

Origin
- Language: Latin
- Meaning: Noblewoman, patrician

Other names
- Related names: Patrick, Pat, Patrice, Patsy, Patti, Tricia, Trish, Trixie, Patrizia

Patricia is a feminine given name of Latin origin. Derived from the Latin word patrician, meaning 'noble', it is the feminine form of the masculine given name Patrick. Another well-known variant is Patrice.

According to the US Social Security Administration records, the use of the name for newborns peaked at #3 from 1937 to 1943 in the United States, after which it dropped in popularity, sliding to #745 in 2016. From 1928 to 1967, the name was ranked among the top 11 female names.

In Portuguese and Spanish-speaking Latin-American countries, the name Patrícia/Patricia is common as well, pronounced [paˈtɾisiɐ] in Portuguese and [paˈtɾisja] in Spanish. In Catalan and Portuguese it is written Patrícia, while in Italy, Germany and Austria Patrizia is the form, pronounced [paˈtrittsja] in Italian and [paˈtʁiːtsi̯a] in German. In Polish, the variant is Patrycja, pronounced [paˈtrɨt͡sja]. It is also used in Romania, in 2009 being the 43rd most common name for baby girls.

== People ==
- Patricia of Naples (died c. 665), Italian Roman Catholic and Eastern Orthodox saint
- Patricia Adams (1949–2020), American actress who used the stage name Velvet Rhodes
- Patricia Allan (born 1938), New Zealand nurse and vicar
- Patricia Angadi (1914–2001), British portrait painter and novelist
- Patricia Arquette (born 1968), American actress and director
- Pat Ashworth (1930–2023), British nursing sister
- Patricia Bell-Scott, American scholar of women's studies and black feminism
- Pat Benatar (born 1953), American singer
- Patrice Bergeron (born 1985), Canadian former professional hockey player
- Patricia Boy, American politician
- Patricia Bracewell (born 1950), American author of historical fiction
- Patricia Brake (1942–2022), English actress
- Patricia Briggs (born 1965), American author
- Patricia M. Bryson, American clubwoman
- Pat Cadigan (born 1953), American author
- Patricia Clarkson (born 1959), American actress
- Pat Cochran (1916–2007), American politician
- Patricia "Tricia" Nixon Cox (born 1946), daughter of Richard Nixon
- Patricia Hill Collins (born 1948), American scholar of feminism and gender
- Patricia Cornwell (born 1956), American author
- Patricia Crampton (1925–2016), British literary translator
- Patricia Dagban-Zonvidé (born 1960), Togolese politician
- Patti Davis (born 1952), American actress and author
- Patricia Delgado, American ballet dancer
- Pat Dowell (born 1957), American politician
- Patricia Emonet (born 1956), French alpine skier
- Patty (singer) (born 1960), Japanese–American singer Patricia Fink
- Patricia C. Frist (1939–2021), American businesswoman and philanthropist
- Patricia Gaztañaga (born 1966), Spanish television presenter
- Patricia Gibney, Irish author
- Patricia Gómez (born 1971), Bolivian politician
- Patricia Gonçalves (politician) (born 1971), Portuguese politician
- Patrícia Gouveia (born 1987), Portuguese footballer
- Patricia Grace (born 1937), Maori writer
- Patricia Guerrero Acevedo (born 1956), Colombian lawyer and feminist activist.
- Patricia Gutiérrez (born 1983), Venezuelan politician
- Patricia Hernández (politician) (born 1980), Canary Island politician
- Pat Harvey (born 1955), American journalist
- Patricia Heaton (born 1958), American actress, comedian, producer and model
- Patricia Hennin, Canadian multi-sport Paralympic athlete
- Patty Hearst (born 1954), American heiress
- Patricia Hewitt (born 1948), Australian-born British Labour Party politician
- Patricia Higgins, American politician
- Patricia Highsmith (1921–1995), American novelist
- Patricia Hodge (born 1946), English actress
- Patricia Hollingsworth Holshouser (1939–2006), American civic leader and nurse
- Patricia Hunt, New Zealand chemist
- Patricia Hy-Boulais (born 1965), former tennis player
- Patricia Janečková (1998–2023), Slovak opera singer
- Patricia Joudry (1921 – 2000), Canadian playwright and author.
- Patricia Penn Anne Kemp, Canadian writer better known as Penn Kemp
- Patricia Kalember (born 1956), American actress
- Patricia Krenwinkel (born 1947), convicted murderer
- Patricia Kennedy Lawford (1924–2006), American socialite
- Patti LaBelle (born 1944), American singer, songwriter
- Patricia Lamah (born 1987), Guinean politician and hairdresser
- Patricia Lawson (1929–2019), Canadian multi-sport athlete and coach
- Patricia Lemoine (born 1961), French politician
- Patricia Littlechild (born 1965), Scottish sport shooter and neurosurgeon
- Pat Lundvall, American lawyer
- Patricia Madigan, Australian Catholic, interfaith leader, feminist writer
- Patricia Magtanong (born 1994), Miss International Philippines 2019
- Patricia Mancilla (born 1966), Bolivian politician
- Rooney Mara (born 1985), American film actress (born Patricia Rooney Mara)
- Patricia Marroquín (born 1970), Guatemalan public figure and the incumbent First Lady of Guatemala
- Pat Marsh (ice hockey) (1934–2017), British ice hockey administrator
- Patricia Mayayo (born 1967), Spanish art historian
- Patricia McConnell (born 1948), American ethologist, author, advice columnist, and radio host
- Pat McDonagh (1934–2014), British fashion designer
- Patricia McKenzie, Canadian actress, dancer and singer
- Patricia A. McKillip (1948–2022), American fantasy and science fiction writer
- Patricia McPherson (born 1954), American actress
- Patricia Medina – British actress (1919–2012)
- Patricia Mountain, English politician
- Patricia Navidad (born 1973), Mexican actress and singer
- Patricia Neal (1926–2010), American actress
- Patricia Newcomb (born 1930), American producer and publicist
- Pat Nixon (1912–1993), former First Lady of the United States
- Patricia O'Connor, multiple people
- Patricia O'Lynn (born 1989), Northern Irish politician
- Patrice O'Neal (1969–2011), American stand-up comedian and actor
- Patricia Owens (1925–2000), Canadian-born American actress
- Patricia Petersen, Australian academic, politician, actress, playwright and director
- Patricia Poleo (born 1965), Venezuelan journalist
- Pat Phoenix (1923–1986), British actress (born Patricia Phoenix)
- Patricia Piccinini, Australian artist and sculptor
- Patricia Quinn (disambiguation), multiple people
- Patricia Redlich (1940–2011), Irish clinical psychologist
- Patricia Richardson (born 1951), American television and film actress
- Patricia Rideout-Rosenberg (1931–2006), Canadian contralto and music educator
- Patricia Routledge (1929–2025), British actress
- Patricia Rozema (born 1958), Canadian film director, writer and producer
- Patricia Ruanne (1945–2022), British ballerina
- Patrice Rushen (born 1954), American jazz pianist, R&B singer, composer, record producer, multi-instrumentalist, songwriter, and music director
- Pat Russell (1923–2021), American community activist and politician
- Patricia Randall Tindale (1926–2011), English architect and civil servant
- Patricia Salas O'Brien (born 1958), Peruvian sociologist and Minister of Education
- Patricia Tudor Sandahl (born 1940), Swedish writer
- Patricia Schady (born 1978), British astrophysicist
- Patricia Seteco (born 1992), Angolan footballer
- Patricia Walton Shelby (1928–2002), American civic leader
- Pat Spearman (born 1955), American politician
- Patricia Stanciu (born 2011), Romanian rhythmic gymnast
- Trish Stratus (born 1975), Canadian professional wrestler, actress, and yoga instructor
- Patricia Taft (born 1984), American interior designer and philanthropist
- Patricia Maria Țig (born 1994), Romanian tennis player
- Patricia Maria Vanzella, Brazilian pianist and professor of music
- Patricia Wettig (born 1951), American actress and playwright
- Patricia Woodlock (1873 – alive in 1930), British artist and suffragette
- Patricia Young, Canadian poet
- Princess Patricia of Connaught (1886–1974), member of the British royal family
- Trisha Yearwood (born 1964), American country singer

== Fictional characters ==
- Patricia Dorval, a survivor in the video game Identity V
- Patricia Martin (パトリシア・マーティン), a fictional character with her nickname Patty (パティ) in the slice-of-life comedy manga and anime series Lucky Star
- Patricia Robertson (comics), Marvel Comics character
- Patricia "Patty" Spivot, a character in DC Comics
- Patricia "Patty" O'Brien, a character in Candy Candy
- Patricia Walker, Marvel Comics superhero Hellcat
- Patricia, Morgana's human alterego from The Little Mermaid II: Return to the Sea
- Peppermint Patty - Peanuts comic strip character
- Patricia "Tater" Ramirez Humphrey and Bisabuela Patricia "Pati" Platas, Primos

== See also ==
- Patricia (genus), a genus of butterflies in the family Nymphalidae
- List of storms named Patricia
  - Hurricane Patricia, strongest storm ever recorded in the Western Hemisphere
- Patty (given name)
- Tricia
- Trish
- Trisha
