= Patrizia =

Patrizia [paˈtrittsja] is a feminine Italian given name meaning "noble". Notable people with the name include:

- Patrizia (singer), Italian-Canadian dramatic coloratura soprano who performs operatic rock
- Patrizia Arnaboldi (1946–2025), Italian politician
- Patrizia Azzi, Italian physicist
- Patrizia von Brandenstein (born 1943), American production designer
- Patrizia Caselli (1960–2026), Italian actress and television presenter
- Patrizia Ciofi (born 1967), Italian operatic soprano
- Patrizia De Blanck (1940–2026), Italian television personality and socialite
- Patrizia Gianni (born 1952), Italian mathematician
- Patrizia Gucci (born 1956), Italian fashion and interior designer, painter, and author
- Patrizia Laquidara (born 1972), Italian singer
- Patrizia Marrocco (born 1977), Italian politician
- Patrizia Panico (born 1975), Italian football player
- Patrizia Paterlini-Bréchot, Italian scientist
- Patrizia Piacentini (born 1961), Italian Egyptologist, archaeologist and University professor
- Patrizia Prestipino (born 1963), Italian politician
- Patrizia Reggiani (born 1948), ex-wife of Maurizio Gucci
- Patrizia Rossi, nuclear physicist
- Patrizia Sandretto Re Rebaudengo (born 1959), Italian contemporary art collector
- Patrizia Scianca (born 1961), Italian voice actress
- Patrizia Toia (born 1950), Italian politician

== See also ==
- Patrizia Immobilien
- Patrizia AG
