= 1961 in animation =

Events in 1961 in animation.

== Events ==
=== January ===
- January 7: Robert McKimson's Speedy Gonzales and Sylvester cartoon Cannery Woe premieres, produced by Warner Bros. Cartoons.
- January 21: Chuck Jones' Wile E. Coyote and Road Runner cartoon Zip 'N Snort premieres, produced by Warner Bros. Cartoons.
- January 24: Voice actor Mel Blanc suffers a car accident which leaves him in a coma for two weeks. He is brought back to consciousness by addressing his Looney Tunes characters, in whose voices he replies.
- January 25: Walt Disney's One Hundred and One Dalmatians premieres, directed by Wolfgang Reitherman, Hamilton Luske and Clyde Geronimi.
- January 30: The first episode of The Yogi Bear Show is broadcast, marking the debuts of Snagglepuss and Yakky Doodle.

=== February ===
- February 11: Robert McKimson's Sylvester and Hippety Hopper cartoon Hoppy Daze premieres, produced Warner Bros. Cartoons.
- February 20: Wolfgang Reitherman's Goofy cartoon Aquamania premieres.
- February 25: The first episode of Art Clokey's Davey and Goliath is broadcast.

=== March ===
- March 18: Robert McKimson's Foghorn Leghorn cartoon Strangled Eggs premieres, produced by Warner Bros. Cartoons. Also starring Henery Hawk & Miss Prissy (who both make their final appearance in the Golden age of animation).

=== April ===
- April 1: Robert McKimson's Sylvester cartoon Birds of a Father premieres, produced by Warner Bros. Cartoons. Also starring Sylvester Jr.
- April 7: The Flintstones concludes its first season on ABC with the episode "Fred Flintstone: Before and After".
- April 17: 33rd Academy Awards: Munro wins the Academy Award for Best Animated Short.
- April 22: Friz Freleng's Sylvester cartoon D' Fightin' Ones premieres, produced by Warner Bros. Cartoons. The short is a parody of the 1958 film The Defiant Ones.

=== May ===
- May 1: The first episode of Otogi Manga Calendar is broadcast, the first anime TV series.
- May 20: Chuck Jones and Maurice Noble's Bugs Bunny and Daffy Duck cartoon The Abominable Snow Rabbit premieres, produced by Warner Bros. Cartoons.

=== June ===
- June 3: Chuck Jones and Abe Levitow's Wile E. Coyote and Road Runner cartoon Lickety-Splat premieres, produced by Warner Bros. Cartoons.
- June 21: Hamilton Luske's The Litterbug, the final theatrical Donald Duck cartoon premieres.
- June 24: Chuck Jones' Pepé Le Pew cartoon A Scent of the Matterhorn premieres, produced by Warner Bros. Cartoons. Also starring Penelope Pussycat.

=== July ===
- July 15: Friz Freleng's Tweety and Sylvester cartoon The Rebel Without Claws premieres, produced by Warner Bros. Cartoons. This is the final Tweety and Sylvester cartoon to be solely directed by Friz Freleng, as he would go on to direct two more shorts with Hawley Pratt.
- July 29: Chuck Jones and Maurice Noble's Bugs Bunny and Wile E. Coyote cartoon Compressed Hare premieres, produced by Warner Bros. Cartoons.

=== August ===
- August: The first episode of Pingwings is broadcast.
- August 19: Friz Freleng and Hawley Pratt's Speedy Gonzales and Sylvester cartoon The Pied Piper of Guadalupe premieres, produced by Warner Bros. Cartoons. It was nominated for an Academy Award.

=== September ===
- September 2: Friz Freleng and Hawley Pratt's Bugs Bunny and Yosemite Sam cartoon Prince Violent premieres, produced by Warner Bros. Cartoons. The short was later renamed as "Prince Varmint" for TV airings.
- September 7: Switchin' Kitten, the first Tom and Jerry cartoon directed by Gene Deitch premieres.
- September 15: Season 2 of The Flintstones begins on ABC with the premiere of the episode "The Hit Song Writers", guest starring Hoagy Carmichael.
- September 23: Robert McKimson's Daffy Duck and Porky Pig cartoon Daffy's Inn Trouble premieres, produced by Warner Bros. Cartoons. This is McKimson's final short starring Porky (though he would appear in McKimson's 1966 short Mucho Locos, but as archival footage from Chuck Jones' Robin Hood Daffy).
- September 24: The first episode of Walt Disney's Wonderful World of Color premieres, in which Ludwig von Drake makes his debut.
- September 27:
  - The first episode of Hanna-Barbera's Top Cat is broadcast.
  - The first episode of Jay Ward's Dudley Do-Right is broadcast.

=== October ===
- October 4: The first episode of The Alvin Show is broadcast.
- October 26: Gene Deitch's Tom and Jerry cartoon Down and Outing premieres. This short marks the debut of Tom's negatively-received owner (nicknamed Clint Clobber) who constantly abuses the feline for the latter's actions.

=== November ===
- November 11: Chuck Jones and Maurice Noble's Wile E. Coyote and Road Runner cartoon Beep Prepared premieres, produced by Warner Bros. Cartoons. This was the only Wile E. Coyote and Road Runner short to be nominated for an Academy Award.

=== December ===
- December 2: Friz Freleng and Hawley Pratt's Tweety and Sylvester cartoon The Last Hungry Cat premieres, produced by Warner Bros. Cartoons. The short is a parody of the anthology horror TV-show Alfred Hitchcock Presents.
- December 7: Gene Deitch's Tom and Jerry cartoon It's Greek to Me-ow! premieres.
- December 30: Chuck Jones' Nelly's Folly produced by Warner Bros. Cartoons, premieres.

=== Specific date unknown ===
- Bagdasarian Productions is founded by Ross Bagdasarian Sr. to produce works based on his fictional characters, Alvin and the Chipmunks. Their first production was the animated series The Alvin Show.
- Lev Atamanov's The Key premieres.
- Arthur Lipsett's Very Nice, Very Nice premieres.

== Films released ==
- January 25 - One Hundred and One Dalmatians (United States)
- March 5 - The Coyote's Lament (United States)
- June 28 - Cipollino (Soviet Union)
- July 19 - The Orphan Brother (Japan)
- December 8 - The Strange History of the Citizens of Shilda (East Germany)
- Specific date unknown - The Key (Soviet Union)

== Television series ==
- January 1 - The Dick Tracy Show debuts in syndication.
- January 30 - The Yogi Bear Show debuts in syndication.
- April 3 - Minna no Uta debuts on NHK.
- May 1 - Otogi Manga Calendar debuts on TBS.
- September - The Dudley Do-Right Show debuts on ABC.
- September 1 - Tales of the Wizard of Oz debuts in syndication.
- September 27 - Top Cat debuts on ABC.
- October 3 - Calvin and the Colonel debuts on ABC.
- October 4 - The Alvin Show debuts on ABC and NBC.
- Specific date unknown:
  - Out of the Inkwell and The Underseas Explorers debut in syndication.
  - Pingwings debuts on ITV.

== Births ==
=== January ===
- January 2: Gabrielle Carteris, American actress (voice of Vicki Vale in the Batman: The Brave and the Bold episode "Battle of the Superheroes!", Sable Thorpe in the Batman Beyond episode "King's Ransom", Poppy Beifong in the Avatar: The Last Airbender episode "The Blind Bandit", Jane Sherman in The Mummy episode "Old Friends").
- January 3: Robert N. Skir, American writer (X-Men: The Animated Series, Gargoyles, Batman: The Animated Series, Spider-Man, Beast Machines: Transformers, Extreme Ghostbusters, Godzilla: The Series, DinoSquad, X-Men: Evolution),
- January 4: Graham McTavish, Scottish actor (voice of Dracula in Castlevania, Loki in The Avengers: Earth's Mightiest Heroes, Sebastian Shaw in Wolverine and the X-Men, Savanti Romero in Teenage Mutant Ninja Turtles, Fergus McDuck in DuckTales).
- January 9:
  - Candi Milo, American voice actress (voice of Sweetie Pie in Tiny Toon Adventures, Red in 2 Stupid Dogs, Mom and Teacher in Cow and Chicken, Crystal and Amber in Scooby-Doo and the Alien Invaders, Coco, Madame Foster, and Cheese in Foster's Home for Imaginary Friends, Maya Santos in Maya & Miguel, Irma Lair in W.I.T.C.H, Nora Wakeman in My Life as a Teenage Robot, Ophelia Ramírez in The Life and Times of Juniper Lee, The Flea in ¡Mucha Lucha!, Snap in ChalkZone, Nick Dean in The Adventures of Jimmy Neutron, Boy Genius, Jacobo in The Replacements, Constance Goldman in Pepper Ann, the title character in Astro Boy Continued voice of Dexter in Dexter's Laboratory, Granny and Witch Hazel in the Looney Tunes franchise).
  - Al Jean, American writer, animator and producer (The Simpsons, co-creator of The Critic).
- January 10: Steve Hickner, American animator and director (Walt Disney Animation Studios, DreamWorks Animation, He-Man and the Masters of the Universe).
- January 13: Julia Louis-Dreyfuss, American actress and comedian (voice of Princess Atta in A Bug's Life, Laurel Lightfoot in Onward, Gloria in The Simpsons, Rochelle in Planes, Julia in the Dr. Katz, Professional Therapist episode "Ben Treats", Miss Felter in the Hey Arnold! episode "Crush on Teacher").
- January 14:
  - Japhet Asher, English-born American television producer and writer (MTV Animation, Pet Alien).
  - Robert Walker, Canadian-American animator (Atkinson Film-Arts, The Raccoons, Walt Disney Animation Studios), storyboard artist (Dennis the Menace), background artist (COPS) and director (Brother Bear), (d. 2015).
- January 18: Bob Peterson, American animator, director, screenwriter, storyboard artist, and actor (Pixar).
- January 28:
  - Michael Paraskevas, American illustrator, cartoonist, and producer (co-creator of The Kids from Room 402, Maggie and the Ferocious Beast and Marvin the Tap-Dancing Horse).
  - Robbyn Kirmsse, American singer and actress (voice of Ember McLain in Danny Phantom, Germette in the Curious George episode "The Inside Story", singing voice of Penny Sanchez in ChalkZone).
- January 29: Michael Ferris, American television writer (Rugrats, Beethoven, Æon Flux, Recess, The Simpsons) and script consultant (Hey Arnold!).
- January 30:
  - Denys Cowan, American television producer (Static Shock, The Boondocks), storyboard artist (Joseph: King of Dreams, Invasion America, The Electric Piper), and co-founder of Milestone Media.
  - Dexter King, American civil rights activist (voice of Martin Luther King Jr. at age 34 in Our Friend, Martin), (d. 2024).

=== February ===
- February 4: Ron Scalera, American marketer and promotion executive (executive in charge for The Simpsons episode "The Simpsons 138th Episode Spectacular"), (d. 2010).
- February 5:
  - Bruce Timm, American artist, character designer, animator, writer, producer, and actor (Warner Bros. Animation).
  - Tim Meadows, American actor, comedian, and writer (voice of Richard Stands in Olive, the Other Reindeer, Lil' Barack in Lil' Bush, Mike the Mailman in Bob's Burgers, Brent in Santa Inc., Samuel in Chicago Party Aunt, Quail Eegan in Digman!, Wind Song in The Venture Bros. episode "Sphinx Rising", Orville in the Animals episode "Horses", Jameson's Dad in the BoJack Horseman episode "A Horse Walks into a Rehab").
- February 13: Henry Rollins, American singer, writer, actor, and presenter (voice of Mad Stan in Batman Beyond, Zaheer in The Legend of Korra, Jonny Rancid in Teen Titans, Skylar in Shorty McShorts' Shorts, Bob Rainicorn/Cookie Man in Adventure Time, Kilowog in Green Lantern: Emerald Knights, Tri-Klops in Masters of the Universe: Revelation, Bonk in Batman Beyond: Return of the Joker, Cliff Steele/Robotman in the Batman: The Brave and the Bold episode "The Last Patrol!", Trucker in the American Dad! episode "Chimdale", Skeletony in the Uncle Grandpa episode "Hide and Seek", Speedy Silverado in the Sheriff Callie's Wild West episode "Blazing Skaters").
- February 23: Don Rhymer, American screenwriter and film producer (Fish Police, Surf's Up, Blue Sky Studios), (d. 2012).
- February 27:
  - Grant Shaud, American actor (voice of Foreman in Antz, Harry Loomis / Pack Rat in the Batman: The Animated Series episode "Make 'Em Laugh", Felix Hoenikker in the Godzilla: The Series episode "Talkin' Trash", Mr. Culpepper in The Wild Thornberrys episode "The Dragon and the Professor").
  - Michaela Pavlátová, Czech animator and film director (Reci, Reci, Reci (Words, Words, Words), Repete, Tram, My Sunny Maad).

=== March ===
- March 4: Steven Weber, American actor (voice of Green Goblin and Venom in Ultimate Spider-Man, Charlie B. Barkin in All Dogs Go to Heaven: The Series, Alfred Pennyworth in Batman: Return of the Caped Crusaders, Batman vs. Two-Face, and the Scooby-Doo and Guess Who? episode "What a Night for a Dark Knight!", Brian Hackett in Duckman, Beyonder in Avengers Assemble, Odysseus in Hercules).
- March 8:
  - Jess Winfield, American novelist, television writer (Disney Television Animation), and voice actor (continued voice of Jumba Jookiba in the Lilo & Stitch franchise).
  - Camryn Manheim, American actress (voice of Tria in The Land Before Time franchise, Ellen Pine in the Family Guy episode "Dammit Janet", Camryn in the Higglytown Heroes episode "Twinkle Tooth").
- March 11: Greg Kramer, British-Canadian author, actor, director and magician (voice of Anton in George and Martha, Nemo in Arthur, additional voices in Tripping the Rift), (d. 2013).
- March 13: Paul Berry, British animator and director (The Sandman, worked for Cosgrove Hall and Henry Selick), (d. 2001).
- March 14: Penny Johnson Jerald, American actress (voice of Amanda Waller in Justice League: Gods and Monsters, Sarafina in The Lion King).
- March 19: Jonathan Collier, American television producer and writer (The Simpsons, King of the Hill, What's New, Scooby-Doo?, The Goode Family).
- March 20: Louis Chirillo, American-Canadian former actor (voice of Ed in Sitting Ducks, Salem in Sabrina: Friends Forever, Ken Kelley in Being Ian, Ransack in Transformers: Cybertron, Dukey and Mr. Teacherman in Johnny Test, Jimmy and Dogwood in Krypto the Superdog, Shaman in Pucca, Living Laser in Iron Man: Armored Adventures, Wormwood in Barbie: The Pearl Princess, Lion in the Tom and Jerry Tales episode "You're Lion").
- March 21: Kathy Zielinski, American animator (Walt Disney Animation Studios, FernGully: The Last Rainforest, DreamWorks Animation, The Book of Life, The Simpsons) and character designer (FernGully: The Last Rainforest, Pocahontas).
- March 25: Aron Warner, American film producer and voice actor (Shrek).
- March 29: Amy Sedaris, American actress and comedian (voice of Foxy Loxy in Chicken Little, Princess Carolyn in BoJack Horseman, Cinderella in Shrek the Third, Mina Loveberry in Star vs. the Forces of Evil, Pepper in DuckTales, Ma Angler in SpongeBob SquarePants, Bandit Princess in the Adventure Time episode "I Am a Sword", Yellow Zircon and Blue Zircon in the Steven Universe episode "The Trial").
- March 31: Laurence Crouzet, French voice actress (French dub voice of April O'Neil in Teenage Mutant Ninja Turtles, Wuya in Xiaolin Showdown, Launch in Dragon Ball, Phoebe in James Bond Jr.), (d. 2026).

=== April ===
- April 2: Christopher Meloni, American actor (voice of Hal Jordan in Green Lantern: First Flight, Commissioner Gordon and Two-Face in Harley Quinn).
- April 3: Eddie Murphy, American actor and comedian (voice of Mushu in Mulan, Donkey in the Shrek franchise, creator of and voice of Thurgood Stubbs in The PJs).
- April 8: Gregg Vanzo, American animator (Marvel Productions, Garfield: His 9 Lives, Looney Tunes), overseas supervisor (The Ren & Stimpy Show, Beavis and Butt-Head, The Critic, Timon & Pumbaa, Stitch! The Movie), director (The Simpsons, The Maxx, Futurama) and producer (founder of Rough Draft Studios).
- April 12: Magda Szubanski, Australian comedy actress, author, singer and LGBT rights advocate (voice of Beatrice in Santa's Apprentice, Mrs. Mutton in 100% Wolf, and Miss Viola in Happy Feet and Happy Feet Two).
- April 13: Liz Callaway, American actress and singer (singing voice of the title character in Anastasia, Jasmine in the Aladdin franchise, Odette in The Swan Princess, and Kiara in The Lion King II: Simba's Pride, voice of The Speaker of God in the Hazbin Hotel episode "Storyteller").
- April 18:
  - Joe Whyte, American actor and artist (Walt Disney Animation Studios).
  - Jane Leeves, English actress (voice of Ladybug in James and the Giant Peach, Athena in Hercules, Ari Curd in the We Bare Bears episode "Googs").
- April 20: Don Mattingly, American former baseball baseman, coach and manager (voiced himself in The Simpsons episode "Homer at the Bat").
- April 21: Cathy Cavadini, American voice actress (voice of Blossom in The Powerpuff Girls, Tanya Mousekewitz in An American Tail: Fievel Goes West).
- April 23: George Lopez, American comedian and actor (voice of Rafael in Rio and Rio 2, Ernesto Estrella in The Loud House and The Casagrandes, José Posada in the Victor and Valentino episode "Finding Posada", himself in the Harley Quinn episode "There's No Place to Go But Down").
- April 28: Jamieson Price, American actor (voice of Dreyfus in The Seven Deadly Sins, Gula in DokiDoki! PreCure, Sojiro Sakura in Persona 5: The Animation, Bearbarian in Power Players).

=== May ===
- May 3: Joe Murray, American animator, cartoonist, illustrator, designer, writer, producer and director (creator of Rocko's Modern Life, Camp Lazlo and Let's Go Luna!).
- May 6:
  - Wally Wingert, American voice actor (voice of Almighty Tallest Red in Invader Zim, Renji Abarai in Bleach, Rufus Shinra in Final Fantasy VII: Advent Children, Yuuichirou Jumada in Sailor Moon, Aoba Yamashiro in Naruto, Kotetsu Kaburagi in Tiger & Bunny, Jon Arbuckle in The Garfield Show, Ant-Man and MODOK in The Avengers: Earth's Mightiest Heroes, Cubot in Sonic Boom).
  - George Clooney, American actor and filmmaker (voice of Doctor Gouache in South Park: Bigger, Longer & Uncut, Mr. Fox in Fantastic Mr. Fox, Sparky in the South Park episode "Big Gay Al's Big Gay Boat Ride").
- May 12: Robert Cait, Canadian voice actor (voice of Col. Paul 'Crowbar' Corbin and Gen. Torvek in Starcom: The U.S. Space Force, Proud Pork in Piggsburg Pigs!, Colossus in X-Men, Mr. Wilter and Blocky in ChalkZone, Jake in Spirit: Stallion of the Cimarron, Felix's Father, Constable Gallagher, Insane Santa and Absent-Minded Santa in Santa's Apprentice, Victorian Santa in The Magic Snowflake, French Guard in Mr. Peabody & Sherman, Boris Badenov in Rocky & Bullwinkle, Slab in the Quack Pack episode "Huey Duck, P.I.", Slab Rankle and Sgt. Shriver in the Invader Zim episode "FBI Warning of Doom", Norm the Genie in The Fairly OddParents episode "Fairy Idol", additional voices in My Pet Monster, Beetlejuice, The Adventures of Tintin, Duckman and Max Steel).
- May 16: Kevin McDonald, Canadian actor and comedian (voice of Pleakley in the Lilo & Stitch franchise, Almighty Tallest Purple in Invader Zim, Waffle in Catscratch, Albus Duckweed in Amphibia).
- May 21: Anne D. Bernstein, American television writer (Video Power, KaBlam!, MTV Animation, The Backyardigans, Viva Piñata, Angelo Rules, Kit and Kate, Super Wings), (d. 2022).
- May 27: Peri Gilpin, American actress (voice of Raksha in The Jungle Book: Mowgli's Story, Lana Lionheart in The Lionhearts, Jane Proudfoot in Final Fantasy: The Spirits Within, Hecate in Hercules, Volcana in Superman: The Animated Series, Desiree in Danny Phantom).
- May 29: Linda Wallem, American actress, comedienne, singer, writer, director and producer (voice of Dr. Paula Hutchison, Virginia Wolfe and other various characters in Rocko's Modern Life, Aunt Gretchen and Female Giraffe in Rocko's Modern Life: Static Cling, Mom in the HBO Storybook Musicals episode "Alexander and the Terrible, Horrible, No Good, Very Bad Day").
- May 31: Anthony Agrusa, American animator (Hanna-Barbera, The Legends of Treasure Island, Meena, 101 Dalmatians: The Series, The Mighty Kong, Futurama, Boo Boo Runs Wild, What a Cartoon!, King of the Hill), storyboard artist (Family Guy, American Dad!), overseas supervisor (Boo Boo Runs Wild) and director (The Cleveland Show, Family Guy).

=== June ===
- June 4: Julie White, American actress (voice of Wendy Murphy in the Monsters vs. Aliens franchise).
- June 5: Mary Kay Bergman, American voice actress (voice of the Bimbettes in Beauty and the Beast, Quasimodo's mother in The Hunchback of Notre Dame, Liane Cartman, Sheila Broflovski, Shelly Marsh, Sharon Marsh, Mrs. McCormick and Wendy Testaburger in South Park, Banshee in Extreme Ghostbusters, Barbara Gordon/Batgirl in Batman & Mr. Freeze: SubZero, Timmy Turner in Oh Yeah! Cartoons, Gwen Stacy in the Spider-Man episode "Farewell Spider-Man", continued voice of Dr. Blight in Captain Planet and the Planeteers and Daphne Blake in Scooby-Doo), (d. 1999).
- June 9: Michael J. Fox, Canadian-American retired actor (voice of Milo Thatch in Atlantis: The Lost Empire, the title character in Stuart Little, Stuart Little 2 and Stuart Little 3: Call of the Wild, Gandhi's Remaining Kidney in the Clone High episode "Escape to Beer Mountain: A Rope of Sand", Michael and Werewolf in the Phineas and Ferb episode "The Curse of Candace", himself in the Corner Gas Animated episode "Dream Waiver").
- June 10: Manny Coto, American television writer and producer (Tales from the Cryptkeeper), (d. 2023).
- June 12: Jefferson R. Weekley, American background artist and prop designer (The Simpsons, Family Guy).
- June 18: Ron Hughart, American animator (Mighty Mouse: The New Adventures, Garfield and Friends, Cool World, Family Dog, 2 Stupid Dogs), storyboard artist (Hulk Hogan's Rock 'n' Wrestling) and director (The Ren & Stimpy Show, Futurama, Warner Bros. Animation, My Life as a Teenage Robot, American Dad!).
- June 22: Joe Aaron, American screenwriter and producer (Doug).
- June 25: Ricky Gervais, English actor, comedian, writer (The Simpsons) and director (voice of Penguin in Robbie the Reindeer in Legend of the Lost Tribe, Bugsy in Valiant, James Bing in Escape from Planet Earth, The Conceited Man in The Little Prince, The Cat in The Willoughbys, Ika Chu in Paws of Fury: The Legend of Hank, Charles Heathbar in The Simpsons episode "Homer Simpson, This Is Your Wife", Narrator in the SpongeBob SquarePants episode "Truth or Square", Billy Finn in the Family Guy episode "Be Careful What You Fish For", Hedgehog in Orphanage in the BoJack Horseman episode "Out to Sea", himself in the Scooby-Doo and Guess Who? episode "Ollie Ollie In-Come Free!", and The Simpsons episode "Angry Dad: The Movie", co-creator and co-host of The Ricky Gervais Show).
- June 27:
  - Bernie Mireault, Canadian comic book artist and animator (Heavy Metal, C.L.Y.D.E.), (d. 2024).
  - Meera Syal, English actress, comedian and writer (voice of Owl in Tinga Tinga Tales).
- June 29: Sharon Lawrence, American actress (voice of Maxima in the Superman: The Animated Series episode "Warrior Queen", Scarlett Reynolds in the American Dad! episode "The Scarlett Getter").

=== July ===
- July 4: Ted Elliott, American screenwriter and film producer (Aladdin, Shrek).
- July 5: Patrizia Scianca, Italian actress (dub voice of Sailor Neptune in Sailor Moon, Suneo in Doraemon, Zakuro Fujiwara in Tokyo Mew Mew, Maurice "Twister" Rodriguez in Rocket Power, Judy Neutron in The Adventures of Jimmy Neutron, Boy Genius, Bunnie Rabbot in Sonic the Hedgehog).
- July 15:
  - Forest Whitaker, American actor, producer, director, and activist (voice of Lonnie Brewster in Everyone's Hero, Ira in Where the Wild Things Are, Ernest in Ernest and Celestine, the Turlingtons in American Dad!, Saw Gerrera in Star Wars Rebels).
  - Bill White, American animator and comics artist (Spümcø, Walt Disney Company, DiC Entertainment), (d. 2012).
- July 23:
  - David Kaufman, American voice actor (voice of the title characters in Danny Phantom and Stuart Little, Jimmy Olsen in the DC Animated Universe, Dexter Douglas in Freakazoid!, Marty McFly in Back to the Future, Human Torch in The Avengers: Earth's Mightiest Heroes, Aldrin Pesky in The Buzz on Maggie, Steven Seagull in the Animaniacs episode "Miami Mama-Mia").
  - Woody Harrelson, American actor and playwright (voice of Roy Arnie in Free Jimmy, Jake in Free Birds, Woody Boyd in The Simpsons episode "Fear of Flying").
  - Felix Dexter, English actor, comedian and writer (voice of Vulture and Hare in Tinga Tinga Tales), (d. 2013).
- July 28: Gene Laufenberg, American television producer and writer (Duckman, Pinky and the Brain, Family Guy, Spidey and His Amazing Friends, Boy Girl Dog Cat Mouse Cheese).
- July 30:
  - Laurence Fishburne, American actor (voice of Thrax in Osmosis Jones, narrator in TMNT, Seko the Zebra in Khumba, the Beyonder in Moon Girl and Devil Dinosaur, Alpha Trion in Transformers One).
  - Steve Purcell, American cartoonist and animator (Pixar, creator of Sam & Max).
- Specific date unknown: Daniel St. Pierre, American film director (Everyone's Hero, Legends of Oz: Dorothy's Return), art director, (Tarzan), voice actor, animator, (Filmation), and musician.

=== August ===
- August 4:
  - Chris Landreth, American animator (Ryan).
  - Lauren Tom, American voice actress (voice of Amy Wong in Futurama, Dana Tan in Batman Beyond, Numbuh 3 in Codename: Kids Next Door, Jinx and Gizmo in Teen Titans and Teen Titans Go!, Princess Su in Mulan II, Minh and Connie Souphanousinphone in King of the Hill, Zyx in Legion of Super Heroes, Angela Chen in Superman: The Animated Series, Yoshiko in Kim Possible).
  - Barack Obama, American politician and 44th president of the United States (producer of Ada Twist, Scientist and We the People).
- August 5: Tawny Kitaen, American actress, model and media personality (voice of Annabelle in Eek! The Cat), (d. 2021).
- August 7: Maggie Wheeler, American actress (voice of Trinette McGoon in Archer, Melodia in SilverHawks, Antiope in the Justice League episode "Fury", Dr. Renton in the Kim Possible episode "Motor Ed").
- August 8:
  - The Edge, English-born Irish musician and member of U2 (voiced himself in The Simpsons episode "Trash of the Titans", performed the first theme of The Batman).
  - Natatcha Estébanez, Puerto Rican-born American television producer (Postcards from Buster), (d. 2007).
- August 9: Ted Stearn, American comics artist, animator, storyboard artist (Beavis and Butt-Head Do America, Daria, Downtown, Drawn Together, King of the Hill, Squirrel Boy, Sit Down, Shut Up, Futurama, Rick and Morty, Animals.) and director (Daria, Beavis and Butt-Head), (d. 2019).
- August 13: Dawnn Lewis, American actress (voice of Carol Freeman in Star Trek: Lower Decks, Lela in Kid 'n Play, Terri Lee in Spider-Man, Sheeva in Mortal Kombat: Defenders of the Realm, Di Archer in Bruno the Kid, Sharona Johnson in King of the Hill, LaBarbera Conrad in Futurama, Bessie in Charlotte's Web 2: Wilbur's Great Adventure, Sonja Briggs in Heavy Gear: The Animated Series, Carolyn Baker in Holly Hobbie & Friends, The Boss' Wife in The Life & Times of Tim, Malora in Strange Frame: Love & Sax, Maybelle Mundy in Bunyan and Babe, Jeanette in Bravest Warriors, April McStuffins in Doc McStuffins, Fannie Granger in Spirit Riding Free, Mrs. Parker in Curious George, Patty, Cinnamon Bun, Croissant and Hot Tea in Apple & Onion, Chief in Carmen Sandiego, Professor Klabrax V in Cleopatra in Space, Groomer, Lauren, Gnarled Seagull and The Very Old One in HouseBroken, Jackie Washington in Karma's World, Brickhouse in the Static Shock episode "Army of Darkness").
- August 20: Tuck Tucker, American animator (Filmation, The Little Mermaid, The Simpsons, Rugrats, The Ren & Stimpy Show), storyboard artist (ALF: The Animated Series, Alf Tales, 2 Stupid Dogs, Klasky Csupo, Nickelodeon Animation Studio, Cartoon Network Studios, Looney Tunes, Family Guy, All Hail King Julien), sheet timer (Clarence), writer (SpongeBob SquarePants, Camp Lazlo) and director (Nickelodeon Animation Studio, Drawn Together), (d. 2020).
- August 21:
  - Eric Darnell, American animator, writer, producer and director (DreamWorks Animation).
  - Stephen Hillenburg, American animator, writer, artist, cartoonist and marine biologist (writer and director of Rocko's Modern Life, creator of SpongeBob SquarePants), (d. 2018).
  - Stephen Stanton, American voice actor and visual effects artist (voice of Grand Moff Tarkin in the Star Wars franchise, AP-5 and Ben Kenobi in Star Wars Rebels, Sleepy in The 7D, Tomax and Xamot in G.I. Joe: Renegades, Pigeon Man in Hey Arnold!: The Jungle Movie, Smitty and Needleman in Monsters at Work, Pete Puma in Looney Tunes Cartoons).
- August 23: Nik Ranieri, Canadian-American animator (The Raccoons, Walt Disney Animation Studios, The Simpsons).
- August 25: Kirk Benson, American film editor (King of the Hill, American Dad!, The Cleveland Show, Family Guy), (d. 2021).
- August 27: Tim Johnson, American animator, writer, producer and director (DreamWorks Animation).
- August 28: Jennifer Coolidge, American actress and comedian (voice of Lazy Susan in Gravity Falls, Myrtle in The Loud House, Ms. Lynne Lips in Fish Hooks, Stucky in Arlo the Alligator Boy, Marilyn in Monsters at Work, Dr. Nancy in The Fungies!, Mary Meh in The Emoji Movie, Mrs. Jane Moser in Napoleon Dynamite).
- Specific date unknown: Stanley Townsend, Irish actor (voice of Victor Hugo, Vladimir Trunkov, and Ivan in Cars 2).

=== September ===
- September 1: Bob Schooley, American recording assistant (DIC Entertainment), television writer (DIC Entertainment, Disney Television Animation) and producer (The Penguins of Madagascar, Monsters vs. Aliens, co-creator of Kim Possible).
- September 2: Ron Wasserman, American musician (X-Men: The Animated Series).
- September 6: Bruce W. Smith, American animator, character designer, film director, and television producer (creator of The Proud Family).
- September 11:
  - E.G. Daily, American voice actress and singer (voice of Tommy Pickles in Rugrats, Buttercup in The Powerpuff Girls).
  - Virginia Madsen, American actress and filmmaker (voice of Cleopatra in Scooby-Doo! in Where's My Mummy?, Hippolyta in Wonder Woman, Silver Sable in Spider-Man: The New Animated Series, Roulette in Justice League Unlimited, Arella in the Teen Titans episode "The Prophecy", Commander Heera in the Voltron: Legendary Defender episode "Hole in the Sky", Sarah Corwin in the Justice League episode "The Brave and the Bold").
- September 15:
  - Dan Marino, American former football quarterback (voice of Garth Sinew in The Magic School Bus episode "Works Out", himself in The Simpsons episode "Sunday, Cruddy Sunday").
  - Colin McFarlane, English actor (voice of Chief in The Queen's Corgi, Bulgy and Beresford in Thomas & Friends, Sergeant Slipper in Dennis and Gnasher, JJ and Skip in Bob the Builder, Belly-Up in Zack & Quack, Sparkle in Mike the Knight, Malcolm Williams in Fireman Sam).
- September 16: Jen Tolley, American-Canadian actress.
- September 18: James Gandolfini, American actor and producer (voice of Carol in Where the Wild Things Are), (d. 2013).
- September 21: Nancy Travis, American actress (voice of Bernice, Beatrice, Beverly and Grandma-ma Sophia in Duckman, Grelch in Aaahh!!! Real Monsters, Spencer in The Real Adventures of Jonny Quest episode "Rage's Burning Wheel", Darci Mason in the Superman: The Animated Series episode "Obsession", Cat in The Wild Thornberrys episode "Queen of Denial").
- September 22:
  - Bradley Carow, American film editor (Nickelodeon Animation Studio), track reader (Warner Bros. Animation, Timon & Pumbaa, House of Mouse, Cartoon Network Studios) and composer (SpongeBob SquarePants, Poochini).
  - Bonnie Hunt, American actress and comedian (voice of Sally Carrera in the Cars franchise, Dolly in the Toy Story franchise, Tilly in Sofia the First, Rosie in A Bug's Life, Ms. Flint in the Monsters, Inc. franchise, Bonnie Hopps in Zootopia).
  - Ron Wells, American voice actor (voice of Zidgel in 3-2-1 Penguins), (d. 2025).
- September 23: Chi McBride, American actor (voice of Nick Fury in Avengers Assemble, Ultimate Spider-Man, Hulk and the Agents of S.M.A.S.H., and the Phineas and Ferb episode "Phineas and Ferb: Mission Marvel", Jefferson Smith in Max Steel, Mike in God, the Devil and Bob, Metcalf in Beavis and Butt-Head Do the Universe).
- September 24: Michael Tavera, American composer (Hanna-Barbera, DIC Entertainment, Universal Cartoon Studios, Toonsylvania, Nickelodeon Animation Studio, Mike Young Productions, Disney Television Animation, Time Squad, Warner Bros. Animation, The Secret Saturdays, Max Steel, Monsuno, The Awesomes, Guardians of the Galaxy, Star Wars Resistance, The Bug Diaries) and orchestrator (Captain N: The Game Master, The New Adventures of He-Man, Sabrina: The Animated Series).
- September 25: Heather Locklear, American actress (portrayed Dusty Tails in Looney Tunes: Back in Action, voice of Lisa Clark in the Batman: The Animated Series episode "Prophecy of Doom", Alice in the Eek! the Cat episode "Fatal Eektraction", America in the Duckman episode "America the Beautiful", Nymphs in the Hercules episode "Hercules and the Argonauts", Peggy Donovan in the King of the Hill episode "Old Glory").
- September 30: Michael Preister, American television writer (Johnny Test).

=== October ===
- October 4: Kazuki Takahashi, Japanese manga artist (creator of Yu-Gi-Oh!), (d. 2022).
- October 10: Jodi Benson, American actress and singer (voice of Ariel in The Little Mermaid franchise, House of Mouse, Sofia the First, Ralph Breaks the Internet, and Once Upon a Studio, the title characters in P.J. Sparkles and Thumbelina, Tula in The Pirates of Dark Water, Belle in A Christmas Carol, Ann Darrow in The Mighty Kong, Helen of Troy in Hercules, Barbie in the Toy Story franchise, Asenath in Joseph: King of Dreams, Lady in Lady and the Tramp II: Scamp's Adventure, Jenna in Balto II: Wolf Quest, Lenee in Rapsittie Street Kids: Believe in Santa, Captain Torelli and Princess Incense in Duck Dodgers, Anita Ratcliffe in 101 Dalmatians II: Patch's London Adventure, Lastelle's Mother in Nausicaä of the Valley of the Wind, Patsy Smiles, Ms. Jane Doe and Almondine in Camp Lazlo, Queen Emmaline in Sofia the First, Amber O'Malley in the Pepper Ann episode "Green-Eyed Monster", Aquagirl in the Batman Beyond episode "The Call", Diana in the Clarence episode "The Tails of Mardrynia", Tammy Gobblesworth in The Loud House episode "Flip This Flip").
- October 16: Robert F. Hughes, American animator, storyboard artist (Phineas and Ferb, Bunnicula, Where's Waldo?, Tom and Jerry in New York), sheet timer (The Critic, Klasky Csupo, Nickelodeon Animation Studio, Recess: School's Out, Family Guy, The Proud Family Movie, Ben 10, Phineas and Ferb, Farzar), writer (Phineas and Ferb, Bunnicula, Tom and Jerry in New York), producer (Phineas and Ferb, Milo Murphy's Law) and director (Rocko's Modern Life, The Angry Beavers, The Fantastic Voyages of Sinbad the Sailor, Evil Con Carne, The Grim Adventures of Billy & Mandy, Phineas and Ferb, Bunnicula, Milo Murphy's Law, Mira, Royal Detective).
- October 19: Simon Wells, English animator (Who Framed Roger Rabbit), storyboard artist (DreamWorks Animation, Legends of Oz: Dorothy's Return, Sausage Party, The Lego Ninjago Movie, Michael Jackson's Halloween, Smallfoot), writer (Mars Needs Moms) and director (Amblimation, The Prince of Egypt, Mars Needs Moms).
- October 25: Chad Smith, American musician, drummer and member of the Red Hot Chili Peppers (voiced himself in The Simpsons episode "Krusty Gets Kancelled").
- October 26: John A. Davis, American film director, writer, animator, actor and composer (creator of Jimmy Neutron, founder of DNA Productions).
- October 30: Larry Wilmore, American comedian, writer, producer and actor (voice of Principal Larry in Penn Zero: Part-Time Hero, co-creator of The PJs).

=== November ===
- November 1: Rick Zieff, American actor (voice of Spike the Dog in The Tom and Jerry Show, Mr. Nervous and Mr. Nosy in The Mr. Men Show).
- November 4:
  - Jeff Probst, American television host and producer (voice of Vice Principal Raycliff in Fillmore!, himself in the Family Guy episode "Petey IV").
  - Ralph Macchio, American actor (voice of Timmy in The Secret of NIMH 2: Timmy to the Rescue, Daniel LaRusso in the Robot Chicken episode "Caffeine-Induced Aneurysm").
- November 7: Chris Lang, British television writer, actor, producer and musician (voice of Pigling Bland in The World of Peter Rabbit and Friends, Tiger, Jake, Pig, Arnold, The Bleeper People, Ghost and Mr. Frog in Kipper, Animals in Percy the Park Keeper).
- November 14: D. B. Sweeney, American actor (voice of Aladar in Dinosaur, Sitka in Brother Bear, Aang in The Legend of Korra).
- November 19: Meg Ryan, American actress (voice of Dr. Blight in Captain Planet and the Planeteers, the title character in Anastasia, Dr. Swanson in The Simpsons episode "Yokel Chords").
- November 23: Andy Knight, Canadian animator, film and television director and actor (creator of Ned's Newt, Pig City and Get Ed), (d. 2008).
- November 26: Wes Archer, American animation director and storyboard artist (The Simpsons, Futurama, King of the Hill, Bob's Burgers, Rick and Morty, Disenchantment).
- November 27: Steve Oedekerk, American actor, comedian, director, editor, producer, and screenwriter (Jimmy Neutron: Boy Genius, Barnyard).
- November 28: Martin Clunes, English actor, comedian, director and television presenter (voice of the title characters in Kipper and Merlin the Magical Puppy, Stripy in Little Robots, Dog in Room on the Broom).
- November 29: Tom Sizemore, American actor (voice of Rex Mason / Metamorpho in the Justice League episode "Metamorphosis"), (d. 2023).
- Specific date unknown: Kay Benbow, British television executive (CBeebies), (d. 2024).

=== December ===
- December 2: Ken Keeler, American television producer and writer (The Critic, The Simpsons, The PJs, Futurama, Disenchantment).
- December 13: Tensai Okamura, Japanese anime director and animator (Wolf's Rain, Darker Than Black).
- December 16: LaChanze, American actress, singer, and dancer (voice of Terpsichore in the Hercules franchise).
- December 21: Stephen Shea, American former child actor (voice of Linus van Pelt in Play It Again, Charlie Brown, Snoopy Come Home, You're Not Elected, Charlie Brown, There's No Time for Love, Charlie Brown, A Charlie Brown Thanksgiving, It's a Mystery, Charlie Brown, It's the Easter Beagle, Charlie Brown and Be My Valentine, Charlie Brown).
- December 24:
  - Spike Brandt, American animator, producer, director, screenwriter, and actor (Warner Bros. Animation).
  - Wade Williams, American actor (voice of Two-Face in Batman: The Dark Knight Returns, Killer Croc in Beware the Batman, Black Mask in Batman: Under the Red Hood, Deegan in Green Lantern: Emerald Knights, Perry White in Superman: Unbound, Mantis in the Batman: The Brave and the Bold episode "Cry Freedom Fighters!").

=== Specific date unknown ===
- Teresa Drilling, American animator, director, and designer (Claymation Comedy of Horrors, Chicken Run, Elf, The Curse of the Were-Rabbit, Creature Comforts, the Community episode "Abed's Uncontrollable Christmas", The Simpsons episode "Angry Dad: The Movie").
- John Statema, American comic book artist, illustrator, storyboard artist, and character designer (The Angry Beavers, Jackie Chan Adventures).
- Juraj Korda, Australian animator (Li'l Elvis and the Truckstoppers, John Callahan's Quads!, Dogstar), (d. 2007).

== Deaths ==
=== January ===
- January 16: Joseph Dubin, American composer (Walt Disney Animation Studios), dies at age 60.

=== February ===
- February 18: Cliff Nazarro, American actor (voice of Eddie Cackler in Slap-Happy Pappy), dies at age 57.
- February 27: Nate Collier, American animator, illustrator and comics artist, dies at age 77.

=== June ===
- June 4: Willie Riley, English novelist, (Riley had a career in the sale of magic lantern slides and relevant equipment until 1914, when, with the onset of World War I, his family's company failed. Riley then developed a second career as a professional writer), dies at age 95.

=== July ===
- July 28: Noburo Ofuji, Japanese film director and animator, (directed The Story of the Monkey King, Burglars of "Baghdad" Castle, and The Three Fearless Frogs), dies at age 61.
- July 29: Harry O. Hoyt, American film director and screenwriter pioneer in the use of stop-motion animation as special effects in film, (director of the film The Lost World, known primarily for its use of stop-motion animation), dies at age 75.

=== November ===
- November 28: Arthur Melbourne-Cooper, British filmmaker and photographer, pioneer of stop-motion animation (Dolly's Toys, The Enchanted Toymaker), dies at age 87.
- Specific date unknown: Hy Hirsh, American photographer and film director, dies at age 59 or 60.

== See also ==
- 1961 in anime
