= Anya (Anastasia) =

Fictional character in Anastasia

- First appearance: Anastasia (1997)
- Created by: Don Bluth; Gary Goldman
- Based on: Character: Anastasia (1956); by Arthur Laurents; Personal lives of Grand Duchess Anastasia Nikolaevna of Russia and imposter Anna Anderson; Design: Physical appearances of Audrey Hepburn and Julia Roberts
- Designed by: Don Bluth
- Voiced by: Meg Ryan (speaking); Liz Callaway (singing); Kirsten Dunst (young; speaking); Lacey Chabert (young; singing)
- Portrayed by: Florentine Houdinière (Anastasia on Ice); Christy Altomare (stage musical; 2017); Lila Coogan (stage musical; 2018); Kyla Stone (stage musical; 2021)

In-universe information
- Full name: Anya (born the Grand Duchess Anastasia Nikolaevna of Russia)
- Title: Grand Duchess
- Family: Nicholas II (father); Alexandra (mother); Olga (sister); Tatiana (sister); Maria (sister); Alexei (brother)
- Significant other: Dimitri
- Relatives: Marie (grandmother)
- Nationality: Russian Empire/Soviet Union
- Pets: Pooka (dog)

Anya (Note: Although she was born Anastasia Nikolaevna, the character almost exclusively goes by her pseudonym "Anya", even after she learns she is the Grand Duchess. This article refers to her as "Anya" for consistency, and to distinguish her from the historical figure.) is a character in 20th Century Fox's 1997 animated film Anastasia. A Russian orphan with amnesia, Anya travels to Paris, France to relearn about her past and family. She enlists help from a pair of con artists, who plot to use her resemblance to Russia's Imperial family to win a lucrative reward from her grandmother. Although largely fictionalized, the character is loosely based on two historical figures: Grand Duchess Anastasia Nikolaevna of Russia, the youngest daughter of Nicholas II; and Anna Anderson, an imposter famous for claiming to be the Grand Duchess. Plot elements from the film Anastasia (1956), in which the character is played by actress Ingrid Bergman, also provided inspiration for Anya.

Created by director Don Bluth, Anya is inspired by the urban legend that Anastasia survived the Romanov family's execution in 1918, but the film's writers reimagined her tragic life in favor of a more optimistic ending. Basing her appearance on actresses Audrey Hepburn and Julia Roberts, Bluth redesigned the character several times to achieve a final design he felt best embodied her personality. Anya is voiced primarily by actress Meg Ryan. Despite being the filmmakers' first choice for the role, Ryan was wary about the film's dark subject matter, and only committed after the directors animated an original sequence to dialogue from her film Sleepless in Seattle (1993). Singer Liz Callaway provides Anya's singing voice, while actresses Kirsten Dunst and Lacey Chabert provide the speaking and singing voices, respectively, for a younger version of the character.

Reception towards Anya has been mostly positive, with film critics praising her spirited personality and independence. Ryan's voice acting was also well-received, although some critics found her American accent distracting. As the most famous American depiction of the Grand Duchess, Anya's likeness has been used in a range of tie-in media and merchandise, while various publications have written about her reputation as a strong female character and role model. In 2017, Christy Altomare originated the role of Anya in the Broadway musical adaptation of the film.

== Role ==
Banished by Nicholas II for treason, the mystic Grigori Rasputin sells his soul and curses the Romanovs to die, resulting in a political uprising against the Imperial family. Aided by a servant boy, eight year-old Anastasia escapes across a frozen pond with her grandmother, the Dowager Empress Marie, while Rasputin seemingly drowns in pursuit of them. Anastasia is separated from Marie at a train station and knocked unconscious, losing her memory. Raised in an orphanage, the only clue Anastasia retains about her past is a locket inscribed "Together in Paris" her grandmother had gifted her. 10 years later, an eighteen-year-old Anastasia – now going by "Anya" – decides to travel to Paris, France, to recover some semblance of her family. Meanwhile, rumors circulate that Anastasia may have survived the fateful execution, prompting Marie to offer a ₽10 million reward for the safe return of her granddaughter. Upon arriving in Saint Petersberg, Anya meets Dimitri and Vladimir, a pair of con artists who, upon noticing her striking resemblance to the Romanovs, convince Anya to let them present her as Anastasia to the Dowager Empress in Paris. Under the ruse that they are simply trying to reunite the Grand Duchess with her family, they do not disclose the reward money, and initially fail to realize that Anya is, in fact, Anastasia. Anya's presence alerts an undead Rasputin, who has been trapped in limbo due to failing to kill Anastasia. He pursues Anya relentlessly to fulfill his curse, but his attempts are unsuccessful.

While learning to behave like royalty, some of Anya's memories begin to return, and she grows fond of Dimitri. Dimitri finally realizes Anya is truly Anastasia when she correctly answers how she escaped the palace, revealing to Vladimir that he was the servant who helped her. Marie, having grown despondent from interviewing numerous imposters, accuses Dimitri of only being interested in her money, and vehemently refuses to meet Anya. Overhearing Dimitri's original intentions for the first time, a furious Anya decides to leave Paris, but Marie, having finally been convinced by a relentless Dimitri, intercepts her in her hotel room. After a sincere conversation in which Anya recalls intimate memories and reveals the locket, Marie finally declares that she is Anastasia, and the pair emotionally reunite. Realizing he has fallen in love with Anya, Dimitri refuses the Dowager's reward money and intends to return to Russia, while Anya is conflicted between her loyalty to Marie and feelings for Dimitri. After defeating Rasputin in a final confrontation, Anya ultimately elopes with Dimitri with her grandmother's blessing, promising they will meet again.

== Development ==
=== Creation ===
Anastasia is loosely based on the urban legend that the Grand Duchess Anastasia Nikolaevna of Russia, the youngest daughter of Nicholas II, survived the execution of her family. The character, Anya, is based on Anastasia herself. Although Anastasia was in fact murdered alongside her family in 1918 at the age of 17, (Note: In 2009, DNA testing of the remains of two Romanov children discovered in 2007 near the family's original gravesite confirmed that all five children had, in fact, been killed alongside their parents in 1918, definitively disproving the legend that Anastasia had survived.) rumors of her having escaped the assassination persisted for several years, which prompted numerous impersonators to claim to be her. The most famous imposter was Anna Anderson, whose claims were adapted into several retellings, including a 1956 film (also produced by 20th Century Fox) starring actress Ingrid Bergman as Anastasia.

Considered to be an animated remake of the 1956 film, the previous film's plot was primarily used as the premise and inspiration for the animated character, with the idea of a confused young woman "who doesn't know who she is and discovers she's a princess" inspiring Fox Animation Studios to develop a fairy tale version of the myth. Despite acknowledging Anastasia's heritage and upbringing, the character is largely fictionalized; according to Russian culture researcher Kate White, the ideas that "a lot of people wanted Anastasia to be alive, and a lot of women over the years have claimed to be her" are some of the few historically accurate aspects about Anya. The character also takes several liberties with Anderson's story, who researchers had already determined was not related to the Romanovs by 1994.

While researching the Grand Duchess, director Don Bluth discovered she was a young woman capable of "light[ing] up the whole house" and incorporated transformative elements from the plays My Fair Lady and Pygmalion into her storyline. Agreeing that a documentary-style film would be too dark for its intended audience, the filmmakers opted for a more fantastical re-telling but incorporated some mature elements nonetheless, such as the heroine struggling with an inner conflict, while focusing on the developing romance between Anya and con-man Dimitri. Screenwriter Bruce Graham, who was not particularly fond of the film's tragic origins, felt the character would benefit from a female writer. Eventually, writer Susan Gauthier was recruited, with whom Graham re-worked Anya's somber story into a coming-of-age romance. Actress Carrie Fisher ghostwrote the scene in which Anya begins her journey to Paris, with songwriters Lynn Ahrens and Stephen Flaherty recalling that at least 13 writers worked on this particular scene in order to capture Anya's psyche convincingly.

=== Design and characterization ===
Bluth understood that, by the 1990s, animated heroines had begun to be written as strong, driven heroines, as opposed to simply beautiful princesses yearning for a romantic relationship. He envisioned Anya as tough enough to survive an orphanage, yet regal enough to convincingly pass for royalty. Most of Anya's early concept art was drawn by Bluth himself. Bluth originally struggled to create a suitable design for Anya, re-drawing the character hundreds of times until settling on one he felt embodied her mysterious, strong-willed nature. The director discovered that Anya herself could have a comedic personality, comparing her to actress Goldie Hawn.

According to his notes, Bluth felt the character's eyes were originally drawn too close together, in addition to finding her hair too red and boots too large. Writing for Animated Views, Ben Simon observed that some early drawings conveyed a "softer and more visually appealing version" of the heroine. Other early iterations included a T-shirt and baggy men's trousers inspired by actress Marlene Dietrich. Bluth designed Anya based on actresses Audrey Hepburn and Julia Roberts. According to character designer Len Simon, Anya "physically looks like a princess, but has a more common way of behaving, as she doesn't remember that she belongs to a royal family". Some of Bluth's drawings of Anya were exhibited at the Savannah College of Art and Design in 2017.

Critics believe that Bluth, a former animator for Fox's then-rival studio Disney, was inspired by skills he had learned while working for them; Refinery29's Elena Nicolaou cited Anya's strong resemblance to Ariel from Disney's The Little Mermaid (1989) as an example. Film critic David Sterritt of The Christian Science Monitor described Anya as "a close cousin to all the genre's classic heroines". The yellow court gown Anya wears towards the end of the film is almost an exact replica of one the Grand Duchess herself had worn.

=== Voice ===
Anya's adult speaking voice is provided by actress Meg Ryan. Fox Filmed Entertainment CEO Bill Mechanic was a fan of Ryan's previous work as spunky yet sweet characters, and expressed a strong interest in casting her as the film's lead from the beginning. Although Ryan had always been the filmmakers' first choice for the role, she was initially concerned about the film's dark subject matter. With Graham, Bluth and his co-director, Gary Goldman, persuaded Ryan by showing her a brief original sequence animated to dialogue from one of her films, the romantic comedy Sleepless in Seattle (1993). Ryan immediately accepted, emotionally moved by the amount of effort they had put into convincing her. The first main cast member to sign onto the project, Ryan was cast in 1995. Once she was cast, animators also based Anya's expressions and mannerisms on Ryan's performance in Sleepless In Seattle.

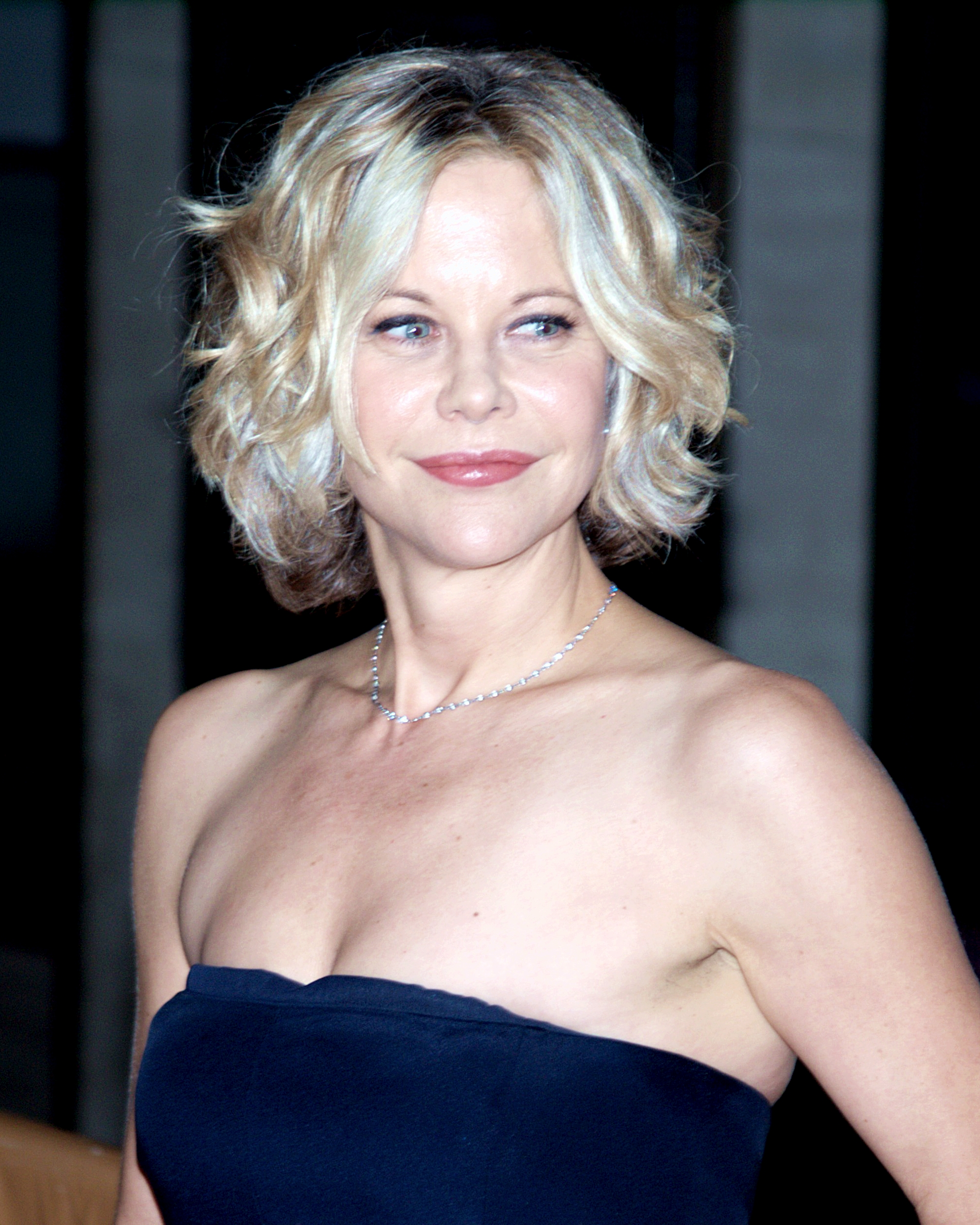
Anya is voiced by actress Meg Ryan.

Her first voice acting role, Ryan found the recording process to be very easy. She worked on the film sporadically for approximately three years for a total of 10 hours, most of which was done prior to animation, and reportedly felt guilty about how little she contributed to the film in comparison to its animators. Ryan claims she would offer 500 readings of a particular line, from which Bluth would choose his favorite. The actress recalled that she originally approached her performance "way [too] over the top", until she listened to herself and adjusted her approach accordingly. Bluth credited Ryan's performance with helping them create an admirable heroine. For mechanical reasons, Ryan recorded most of her dialogue isolated from actor John Cusack, who voices Dimitri, her character's love interest. The co-stars were allowed to record in neighboring sound booths on only one occasion, which Goldman credits with benefiting their performances and chemistry. Ryan and Cusack briefly dated shortly after working on the film together. Producer Maureen Donley spoke highly of Ryan's performance and sense of humor. Despite the character being Russian, Ryan voices Anya using her own American accent.

When Ryan was first cast in 1995, the studio did not immediately disclose to the press whether or not she would be singing her character's songs. Singer Liz Callaway recorded Anya's songs in lieu of Ryan, including the film's two signature songs, "Journey to the Past" and "Once Upon a December". By this time, Callaway had already performed similar dubbing duties in several other animated films during the 1990s, including The Swan Princess (1994) for Michelle Nicastro, the Aladdin sequels The Return of Jafar (1994) and King of Thieves (1996) for Linda Larkin, and The Lion King II: Simba's Pride (1998) for Neve Campbell. Callaway attributes her success as a voice actor to possessing a "young-sounding singing voice", admitting that she typically voices 18-year-old girls. A last-minute addition to the cast, Callaway was originally recruited on a temporary basis solely to record demo tracks of Ahrens and Flaherty's songs when the original demo singer hired became unavailable. Ahrens personally asked Callaway to substitute. Initially, Callaway had only hoped to secure a job as a backup singer, as she had done for Disney's Beauty and the Beast (1991), but the producers were so impressed with her singing that they decided to hire her for the entire film. Before Callaway, the studio had considered hiring Ryan's own sister or a Norwegian singer as Anya's singing voice. While working on Anastasia, Callaway did not hear anything Ryan had recorded, nor was she instructed to sound like the actress. However, she did record a few scenes from Sleepless in Seattle on her Walkman, to which she would sometimes listen while traveling to the recording studio. Callaway believes their voices possess "a quality that was similar enough" to be convincing. She did not meet Ryan until the film's premiere, and considers Anastasia to be a highlight of her career.

Actress Kirsten Dunst, who was 15 years-old at the time, provided the speaking voice of Anastasia as a child, while actress Lacey Chabert provided the singing voice for this version of the character. Mexican voice actress Dulce Guerrero dubbed the character's dialogue and Mexican singer Thalía dubbed the character's songs in the Latin American Spanish dub of the film.

== Critical reception ==
Anya has received positive reviews from film critics, most of whom complimented her vibrant, independent personality. Wendy R. Weinstein of Film Journal International described Anya as a "witty" and "streetwise" character who is strong enough to physically fight Rasputin, a sentiment shared by Nell Minow of Common Sense Media. Marjorie Baumgarten of The Austin Chronicle called her "delightfully un-regal and un-ladylike". Both /Film's Dalin Rowell and Collider's Tyler B. Searle found Anya to be a multidimensional improvement over Thumbelina from Bluth's 1994 film of the same name. James Verniere of The Boston Globe described Anya as "so sweet, charming and likable [that] it's hard to imagine anyone could wish her ill", while El-Shai highlighted her as a refreshing heroine during a decade of "stereotypical 'damsel in distress' Disney Princesses". Praising her honesty and integrity, Bob Smithouser of Plugged In said Anya "values her sense of identity more highly than riches". Some reviewers, such as Screen Anarchy's Sebastian Zavala Kahn, went as far as to declare Anya "one of the most memorable animated protagonists of the 90s", lauding her as a charismatic, engaging character while congratulating her creators for avoiding damsel in distress tropes commonly associated with Disney princesses. Echoing Kahn's proclamation, Leah Rozen of People described Anya as one of the best female characters of the decade, considering the role worthy of actresses Jodie Foster and Michelle Pfeiffer. (Note: In addition to Ryan, Jodie Foster and Michelle Pfeiffer are considered to be among the most popular and successful actresses of the 1990s.) Several critics also noted the character's resemblance to actress Audrey Hepburn.

Ryan's voice acting was also praised by critics, who agreed that she helped make Anya a charming and vibrant character. James Berardinelli of ReelViews called Ryan "perfect" in the role. Hailing her casting as a stroke of genius, the San Francisco Chronicle's Peter Stack said Ryan does a "stunning job", concluding: "Everything audiences liked about Ryan in, say, Sleepless in Seattle, they'll like about her here". Jeff Vice of the Deseret News said Ryan "brings a fieriness to her role" he felt had been lacking from her other performances at the time. Nate Williams of ComingSoon.net and Thomas West of Screen Rant agree that Anya is one of the best performances of Ryan's career. Other critics were less impressed with her efforts; Todd McCarthy, film critic for Variety, felt her "modern American" performance does little to make her character endearing. Writing for the News & Record, film critic Stephen Holden criticized Ryan's voice acting for apparently lacking charm and likened it to a know-it-all cheerleader, while The Philadelphia Inquirer's Desmond Ryan found the actress' American accent jarring. Ryan was nominated for an Annie Award for Outstanding Individual Achievement for Voice Acting by a Female Performer in an Animated Feature Production. Anya's song "Journey to the Past", performed by Callaway, was nominated for an Academy Award for Best Original Song. Retrospectively, several critics and publications have ranked Anya among Ryan's best film performances, with /Film's Samuel Stone calling it "a shame that she hasn't since enjoyed a prolific voiceover career".

Anya was not spared from criticism. AllMovie's Michael Betzold found Anya inferior to Bergman's version of the character from the 1956 film. Film critic and novelist Stephen Hunter felt Ryan's Anya had been too Americanized, likening her to an uncomplicated cheerleader. Mal Vincent of The Virginian-Pilot worried that audiences might struggle to empathize with Anya due to her feisty, "disagreeable" personality. Comparing Anya to Belle and Ariel from Disney's Beauty and the Beast (1991) and The Little Mermaid (1989), respectively, Carol Buckland of CNN felt she was flatly animated at times. Mary Kunz Gokldman, writing for The Buffalo News, opined that despite finding some of her decisions questionable and unconvincing, audiences can not help but be entertained by Anya's personality. Carey Goldberg of The New York Times predicted that Romanov purists will condemn Anya as the "final indignity" against Anastasia, with the Russian Orthodox Church condemning the film's romanticization of Anya. The Chicago Tribune's Michael Wilmington questioned whether Anya was an appropriate heroine for a children's animated film. In an article for Texnews, writer Katherine Landsberg protested the character upon the film's release, criticizing Fox for apparently disrespecting Anastasia by using "flirty images of a teenybopper princess who, in reality, did not live happily ever after".

== Cultural impact ==
=== Legacy ===
According to Samantha Berkhead of The Moscow Times, Anya is the most famous American depiction of Anastasia in popular culture. Vulture critic Hunter Harris crowned Anya "the cinematic It-girl princess of the '90s", while Heart UK called her "iconic". Playbill reporter Adam Hetrick lauded Anya as one "of the most enduring and beloved female heroines in animated film history". According to Gurleen Kaur Bajwa of The Ubyssey, although Anya was originally created with the intention of deconstructing Disney's version of a princess, the character ironically became one of the foremost "examples of ... the quintessential Disney female character", citing her independence, resourcefulness, sense of humor, and intelligence as personality traits that would eventually become commonplace among animated heroines. Screen Rant ranked her one of the "10 Best Animated Movie Princesses That Aren't Disney".

In the decades since her film's release, Anya has enjoyed a reputation as a strong female character among fans, some of whom consider her to be a feminist icon and role model. E!'s Samantha Schnurr said Anya "brought a notable element of independence and personality as an animated female character on the big screen". Contributing to HelloGiggles in 2016, Jen Juneau described Anya as "an extremely admirable role model for young women". According to Maureen Lee Lenker of Entertainment Weekly, the character has earned a cult following among "girls and young women who found [her to be] a relatable, spunky, proto-feminist heroine", in turn empowering a generation of female fans. Similarly, Lauren Henry of The Mary Sue declared that the Broadway musical introduced "a new generation of girls to [the] spunky proto-feminist". Chloe Wintersteen of The Stanford Daily reported that, by 2020, Anastasia had "gained notoriety for being blatantly more feminist than its counterparts that center leading women around romance-driven storylines", describing Anya as a driven, empowered heroine who does not need to be saved. Writing for The New York Times, Rachel Syme quoted a fan who extolled Anya as "a strong feminist character who knew what she wanted and never took no for an answer". Naming Anastasia a "Nearly Perfect Animated Princess Film", Kate Gardner of The Mary Sue described the character as "a delightful lead" with "a tremendous amount of agency". Reviewing the stage musical, Variety theatre critic Frank Rizzo wrote those "in search of a new Broadway role model need look no further than" Anya. The Daily Break contributor Anna Cieslik hailed Anya as "the most badass princess [character] ever", describing her as an "independent, feisty, street smart" heroine who she believes preceded Disney's liberated princess characters by nearly a decade.

Due to its genre, musical numbers, animation style, and central heroine, Anastasia is often mistaken for a Disney film. Consequently, Anya has frequently been mistaken as a member of the Disney Princess franchise. When Disney purchased 21st Century Fox and its properties, including Anastasia, in 2019, several fans and media publications speculated that the character would be inducted into the Disney Princess lineup, but the Disney Princess franchise is not named after the Walt Disney Company itself, but rather because its members are from Walt Disney Pictures productions (i.e. under Disney as a brand), something that often causes confusion among viewers.

=== In other media ===
The character's likeness has been used in extensive merchandise inspired by the film, including dolls, puppets, lunch boxes, backpacks, puzzles, and CD-ROM games. Anya is featured in the video game Anastasia: Adventures with Pooka and Bartok, which is based on events from the film.

Anya appears in Anastasia on Ice, an ice show adaptation of the film, which premiered in 1999. Ice skater Florentine Houdinière performed as Anya but lip synced to Ryan's original dialogue from the film. A stage adaptation of Anastasia premiered on Broadway in 2017, in which the role of Anya was originated by actress Christy Altomare. The actress said she immediately felt connected to Anya, having grown up as fan of the character. Altomare received mostly positive reviews for her performance, for which she was nominated for a Theatre World Award and a Drama Desk Award.

In December 2022, Disney released its first merchandise featuring the character in the form of a mug, a pin and a shirt to honor the 25th anniversary of her film. In 2026, was announced that a limited edition doll of the character would be released for the Disney Designer Collection line due to the 30th anniversary of her film in the following year.

== See also ==
- Anastasia (1997 film)
- Anastasia (musical)
- Grand Duchess Anastasia Nikolaevna of Russia
- Anna Anderson
