= Sandahl =

Sandahl is a Swedish surname. Notable people with the surname include:

- Gösta Sandahl, Swedish figure skater, 1912 European Champion and 1914 World Champion
- Ingrid Sandahl, Swedish gymnast and Olympic champion
- Jette Sandahl, Danish curator and museum director
- Olle Sandahl, Swedish Christian Democratic politician and member of the Riksdag
- Patricia Tudor Sandahl (born 1940), Swedish writer

== Given name ==
- Sandahl Bergman, American dancer, stuntwoman, and actress
