= Trisha =

Trisha is either:

- a female given name usually derived from the female Latin given name Patricia (derived from the Latin word patrician, meaning 'noble'),
- a Hindu unisex given name a transliteration of तृषा (Tṛṣā) meaning thirst or ambition.

Notable people and characters with the name include:

== People ==
- Trisha Ashley, English romantic fiction writer
- Trisha Baga (born 1985), American artist
- Trisha Bailey, Jamaican former student-athlete, philanthropist, and education activist
- Trisha Baptie (born 1973), Canadian citizen journalist and anti-prostitution activist
- Trisha Biggar, Scottish costume designer for theatre, television, and film
- Trisha Bonoan-David (born 1967), Filipino lawyer and politician
- Trisha Brown (1936–2017), American choreographer and dancer; one of the founders of the Judson Dance Theater and the postmodern dance movement
- Trisha Calvarese, American communications professional; candidate in the 2026 United States House of Representatives elections in Colorado
- Trisha Cee (?–2021), South Sudanese singer, songwriter, and activist
- Trisha Chetty (born 1988), South African former cricketer
- Trisha Covington, American R&B singer
- Trisha Crowe, Australian classical pop soprano singer
- Trisha Cummings, American contestant on The Real World: Sydney
- Trisha Davis (born 1954), American biochemist
- Trisha Deb (born 1991), Indian archer
- Trisha Donnelly (born 1974), American contemporary- and conceptual artist
- Trisha Edwards, set decorator
- Trisha Fallon (born 1972), Australian former WNBA player
- Trisha Fernández (born 1994), Angolan-Spanish actress, model, and television presenter
- Trisha Ford (born 1977), American college softball coach
- Trisha Genesis (born 2000), Filipino volleyball player
- Trisha Goddard (born 1957), English television presenter
- Trisha Greenhalgh (born 1959), English professor of primary health care, and retired general practitioner
- Trisha Hart, alternate name of Patricia Harty (actress) (born 1941), American actress
- Trisha Hershberger (born 1982), American YouTuber, vlogger, and television host
- Trisha Kanyamarala (born 2005), Indian-born Irish chess player
- Trisha Krishnan (born 1983), Indian film actress
- Trisha Low, American author and poet
- Trisha Mann-Grant, American actress
- Trisha Meili, American victim in the Central Park jogger case
- Trisha Morton-Thomas, Australian Indigenous writer, producer, director, and actress; co-founder of filmmaking company Brindle Films
- Trisha Noble (1944–2021), Australian singer and actress
- Trisha Paytas (born 1988), American singer, actress, YouTuber, and media personality
- Trisha Posner (born 1951), British non-fiction writer
- Trisha Rae Stahl (born 1973), American actress
- Trisha Ray, American independent producer, screenwriter, filmmaker, actress, editor, sound designer, and charcoal artist
- Trisha Romance (born 1951), American-born Canadian painter and illustrator
- Trisha Shetty (born 1990), Indian lawyer and gender equality activist; founder of organization SheSays
- Trisha Squires (born 1981), Australian sports administrator and youth ambassador
- Trisha Stafford-Odom (born 1970), American basketball coach and former player
- Trisha Stratford, Australian contestant on Married at First Sight (Australian TV series)
- Trisha Suppes, American professor of medicine, psychiatry, and behavioral sciences
- Trisha Torrey (born 1951), American advocate of patient empowerment- and advocacy
- Trisha Tubu (born 2000), Filipino volleyball player
- Trisha Ventker (born 1967), American author, photographic artist, and teacher
- Trisha Ward (born 1972), English composer, lyricist, and playwright
- Trisha Yearwood (born 1964), American country singer, actress, television personality, and author
- Trisha Ziff (born 1956), English curator and documentary filmmaker

== Fictional characters ==
- Trisha, in the 2024 Gujarati romantic comedy drama film Trisha on the Rocks, played by Janki Bodiwala
- Trisha Alden, in the US TV soap opera Loving, played by Noelle Beck and Jessica Steen
- Trisha Cappelletti, in the US adult animated comedy web series The Most Popular Girls in School, voiced by Garrett Mendez
- Trisha Elric, in the Japanese manga series Fullmetal Alchemist
- Trisha Kirby, in the US teen situational dramedy TV series Zoey 101, played by Jennette McCurdy
- Trisha Swaika, in the Indian serial show Laut Aao Trisha, played by Nalini Negi (older) and Suzi Khan (young)
- Trisha Taylor, in the UK TV soap opera EastEnders, played by Cathy Murphy
- Trisha Thoon, in the US satirical TV sitcom Arrested Development, played by Stacey Grenrock-Woods
- Trisha Una, in the Japanese manga series JoJo's Bizarre Adventure
- Trisha Watson, in the UK TV drama Footballers' Wives, played by Angela Ridgeon
- Trisha Yates, in the UK children's TV drama series Grange Hill, played by Michelle Herbert

== See also ==
- Tricia
- Trish
- Patricia
- Mahākālī — Tṛṣā (तृषा, “Thirst”) is one of the names of Mahākālī
