= Susan McElroy =

American psychiatrist

Prof Susan L. McElroy
- Scientific career
- Institutions: Lindner Center of Hope
- Patrons: Linda and Harry Fath

Susan Lynn McElroy is a doctor known for her research in bipolar disorder, eating disorders, obesity, impulse control disorders and pharmacology. She is Chief Research Officer at Lindner Center of Hope.

She has published several books and has received awards in her field.

== Education and early career ==
McElroy got her B.A. at Colgate University in 1979, Hamilton, and her M.D. at Cornell University Medical College in 1983, both in New York. This was followed by an internship in Internal Medicine at Columbia Presbyterian Hospital, and a residency in psychiatry at McLean Hospital, Massachusetts. She has also had fellowships at Cornell University Medical College, Harvard Medical School, and McLean Hospital.

She is the author of over 400 scientific papers in leading medical journals and was the 8th most cited scientist in the world published in the fields of psychiatry and psychology since 1996.

== Research ==
McElroy's research interests include pharmacology, bipolar disorder, obesity, eating disorders, and impulse control disorders.

== Other positions ==
- Lindner Center of Hope, Professor of Psychiatry
- University of Cincinnati College of Medicine, Professor of Psychiatry and Neuroscience

== Awards and honors ==
- Best Mental Health Experts by Good Housekeeping Magazine
- Golden Apple Award for excellence in teaching of residents, University of Cincinnati College of Medicine
- Co-recipient of the Gerald L. Klerman Young Investigator Award of the National Depressive and Manic Depressive Association, 1993

== Selected publications ==
=== Journal articles ===
- Hirschfeld, R., Williams, J., Spitzer, R., Calabrese, J., Flynn, L., Keck, P., Lewis, L., McElroy, S., Post, R., Rapport, D., Russell, J., Sachs, G., & Zajecka, J. (2000). Development and validation of a screening instrument for bipolar spectrum disorder: the Mood Disorder Questionnaire. The American journal of psychiatry, 157 11, 1873–5
- McElroy, S., Keck, P., Pope, H., Smith, J., & Strakowski, S. (1994). Compulsive buying: a report of 20 cases. The Journal of clinical psychiatry, 55 6, 242–8
- McElroy, S., Altshuler, L., Suppes, T., Keck, P., Frye, M., Denicoff, K., Nolen, W., Kupka, R., Leverich, G., Rochussen, J., Rush, A., & Post, R. (2001). Axis I psychiatric comorbidity and its relationship to historical illness variables in 288 patients with bipolar disorder. The American journal of psychiatry, 158 3, 420–6
- McElroy, S., Arnold, L., Shapira, N., Keck, P., Rosenthal, N., Karim, M., Kamin, M., & Hudson, J. (2003). Topiramate in the treatment of binge eating disorder associated with obesity: a randomized, placebo-controlled trial. The American journal of psychiatry, 160 2, 255–61

=== Books ===
Authored or edited:

- Obesity and mental disorders. New York: Taylor & Francis. 2006. ISBN 9780824729448.
- Antiepileptic drugs to treat psychiatric disorders (Medical Psychiatry Series Book 39). New York: Informa Healthcare. 2008. ISBN 9780849382598.
- Psychopharmacology across the life span. Washington, DC [u.a.]: American Psychiatric Pr. 1997. ISBN 9780880484480.
- Use of anticonvulsants in psychiatry : Recent advances. Clifton, N.J.: Oxford Health Care. 1988. ISBN 9780945986003.
- Managing metabolic abnormalities in the psychiatrically ill : A clinical guide for psychiatrists. Washington, DC: American Psychiatric Pub. 2007. ISBN 9781585622412.
