= Nevada State Athletic Commission =

U.S. state unarmed combat regulation agency

Nevada Athletic Commission
Agency overview
- Formed: 1941
- Jurisdiction: Nevada
- Headquarters: 3300 West Sahara Avenue Suite 450 Las Vegas 89102
- Agency executives: Dallas Haun, Chairman (Las Vegas); Alexander G. Chen, Commissioner (Henderson); David Z. Chesnoff, Commissioner (Las Vegas); Anthony A. Marnell III, Commissioner (Las Vegas); Richard Reviglio (Reno), Commissioner
- Parent department: Nevada Department of Business and Industry
- Website: Official website

The Nevada Athletic Commission (NAC; colloquially Nevada State Athletic Commission) is the state agency charged with regulating all contests and exhibitions of unarmed combat—including boxing, mixed martial arts, kickboxing, and other related combat sports—within the U.S. state of Nevada. The commission is composed of five members appointed by the governor and is vested with authority to license participants (fighters, promoters, managers, officials), approve contests, enforce safety standards, and impose discipline, including revocation or suspension of licenses. As the agency responsible for regulating Nevada's combat sports, it is often at the center of high-profile championships hosted by various entertainment venues on the Las Vegas Strip.

Formally established by the Nevada Legislature in 1941, the commission operates as an agency within the Nevada Department of Business and Industry. Notable events regulated by the commission include Ultimate Fighting Championship, WWE, and Power Slap.

== History ==
Nevada permitted professional prizefighting as early as 1897, making it the first state to legalize boxing. Both spectating and participating in boxing was illegal in all states. Nevada's legalization of professional boxing prompted other states to enact film censorship laws, the first of its kind in the United States, to prevent footage of the boxing match being shown in other states.

The commission was established in 1941 when the Nevada Legislature passed legislation to create the five-member athletic commission appointed by the governor. The statute granted the new body "sole direction, management, control, and jurisdiction" over all boxing and wrestling contests in the state. It also required licensure of boxers, managers and referees, imposed limits on bout length, and authorized officials to withhold purses (prizes) and stop contests if participants were not "honestly competing".

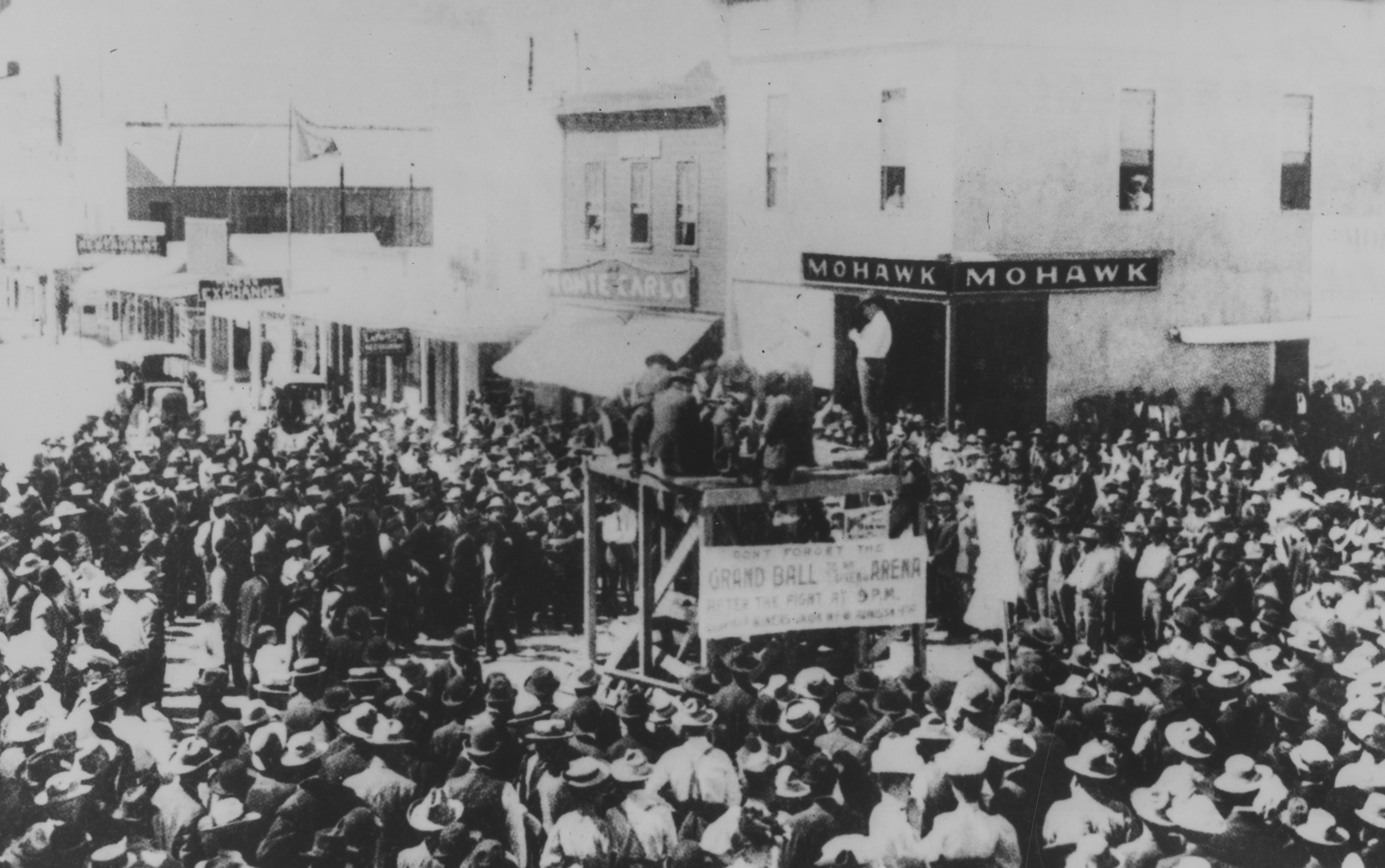
A crowd in September, 1906 cheering for an coming Gans-Nelson boxing match in Goldfield, Nevada.

Although the law was enacted in 1941, its origins stemmed from a reform campaign launched in 1939 by Nevada State Journal (now the Reno Gazette-Journal) sports editor Ty Cobb, who documented mismatches, inadequate medical oversight, last-minute substitutions and instances of fighters using assumed names. Cobb called for a statewide body modeled on California's commission and urged legislators to adopt licensing, medical examinations and enforcement mechanisms.

Governor Edward P. Carville appointed William Lewis, warden of the Nevada State Penitentiary, as the first chair of the Nevada Athletic Commission.

For the next two decades Nevada hosted only modest, local fight cards, but the sport changed dramatically beginning in the mid-1950s. Las Vegas staged its first major prizefight in 1955, and by 1960 the new Las Vegas Convention Center hosted its first world title bout.

During the 1960s, as Las Vegas expanded its resort and entertainment corridor, the commission grew in importance. The commission implemented new policies requiring licensing, medical examinations, training for referees and judges, locker-room monitoring and audits of promoter finances. It also developed procedures for sharing fighter records with other state commissions and asserted the power to penalize or bar licensees for misconduct.

== Organization ==
The commission is composed of five members, each appointed by the governor of Nevada to serve three-year terms; the governor also designates one of the commissioners to serve as chair for a two-year term. As of January 2026, the chair is Dallas Haun (Las Vegas). The other commissioners are Alexander G. Chen (Henderson), David Z. Chesnoff (Las Vegas), Anthony A. Marnell III (Las Vegas) and Richard Reviglio (Reno). Day-to-day operations are overseen by an executive director, who does not have voting rights on the commission. The current executive director is Jeff Mullen. The commission employs a full-time staff of seven.

The commission operates under the Nevada Department of Business and Industry.

== Regulatory functions ==
The commission's authority is established in Nevada Revised Statutes Chapter 467, which grants it jurisdiction over all professional contests and exhibitions of unarmed combat held within the state. Under this framework, the commission licenses participants, including boxers, mixed-martial-arts athletes, managers, promoters, matchmakers, trainers, seconds and officials, and may refuse, suspend or revoke a license for cause.

The commission approves contests and events, ensuring compliance with statutory and regulatory requirements governing equipment, bout duration, weight classes, contracts and the physical condition of contestants. It promulgates rules governing the conduct of contests and assigns licensed referees and judges. The commission also oversees medical examinations, establishes medical and safety protocols, and is authorized to require the presence of physicians and inspectors at sanctioned events.

Regulatory responsibilities include the investigation of alleged violations, the imposition of disciplinary measures and the holding of hearings. The commission may impose fines, suspend or revoke licenses and order forfeiture of purses. It audits promoters' financial records and ensures that contractual obligations, including payment of purses and fees owed to contestants and officials, are satisfied before funds are released.

In addition, the commission participates in information-sharing with other state athletic commissions and recognizes out-of-state disciplinary actions. Its rule-making authority permits the adoption and revision of technical standards and safety rules, including the consolidated Nevada Rules of Unarmed Combat.

== Controversies and criticism ==
=== 2015 Nick Diaz ===
On September 14, 2015, UFC fighter Nick Diaz was suspended for 5 years and fined $165,000. The commission relied on a single positive cannabinoid urinalysis result, out of three tests taken within a few hours of each other. Of the tests, the two returning negative results were the only two conducted by a WADA approved lab. Diaz, a medical marijuana patient, has since received widespread support from the MMA community; fans and fighters alike. The vast majority of reactions have condemned the commission, looking at a number of factors including: the drug-testing process, the ignoring of the evidence by the commission and the overly harsh, arguably personally-motivated punishment levied. Nick Diaz and his lawyers plan to appeal the decision via judicial review.

=== 2016 McGregor fining ===
In October 2016, UFC fighter Conor McGregor was fined $150,000, five percent of his purse for UFC 202, as well as sentenced to fifty hours of community service, due to his involvement in an incident of bottle-throwing at a pre-fight press conference between him and opponent Nate Diaz and entourage; commissioner Pat Lundvall said that McGregor was "to be taught a lesson" and "humbled as it relates to dealing with the public." The $150,000 fine is to be divided between an anti-bullying campaign and the state's general fund; McGregor is also charged with hearing fees. Originally, the attorney general's office proposed a $25,000 fine; the majority of the commission members, however, felt that that amount would not have any significant impact on McGregor; Lundvall originally suggested a 10 percent fee, matching the sentence of Jon Jones and Daniel Cormier.

The sentence was seen by many as too harsh, and criticisms were directed towards the commission for its bias and alleged lack of objectivity, as well as its level of unchecked power. McGregor responded by saying he would never fight in Nevada again, and expressing doubts on whether he'll pay. President of the UFC, Dana White also reacted to the harsh sentence; supporting McGregor, White commented that the sentence may be harmful for the state of Nevada, commenting: "Conor McGregor hit me [up] yesterday and said, 'I don't ever want to fight in Nevada again. Ever.' Now how does that make sense for the state of Nevada? You're gonna try to fine this kid ... that much money, it just makes people not wanna come fight in our state. And that's not a good thing. And guess what? Conor McGregor doesn't need Nevada, he can fight anywhere. He can fight in Iowa, okay. We can put his fight on an island off a coast of anywhere. It just makes no sense for the state and it's terrible."

=== 2021 UNLV student death ===
The commission oversaw an inquiry into the death of University of Nevada, Las Vegas student Nathan Valencia in an unsanctioned Kappa Sigma fraternity "Fight Night" charity event on November 20, 2021, and commissioned an investigation into the matter by the Investigations Division of the Nevada attorney general. The results of the investigation were discussed at an August 23, 2022 meeting of the commission in which chairman Stephen J. Cloobeck and other commissioners pressed officials from the Las Vegas Metropolitan Police Department and the Clark County district attorney's office to explain why they didn't dig deeper into the incident. The attorney general's report concluded, "Law enforcement statements that no crime had been committed were conclusory and premature, and compromised any possible future prosecutions."

The commission had previously unanimously passed what it called "Nathan's Law" that requires emergency safety measures and trained referees be in place for amateur boxing matches and unarmed combat, with potential criminal prosecution for violations of the law.

=== 2024 removal of cannabis from prohibited list ===
On October 30, 2024, it was reported that the commission decided to remove cannabis from the state's prohibited list, stating "the possession, use or consumption of cannabis or cannabis products will not be deemed an anti-doping violation."

== See also ==
- Association of Boxing Commissions
- List of Nevada state agencies
