= Tricia =

Tricia is a feminine given name, often a short form (hypocorism) of Patricia. It may refer to:

== People ==
- Tricia Berry, American politician
- Patricia Tricia Brock (born 1979), American contemporary Christian singer-songwriter
- Tricia Brown (born 1979), Australian rugby union player
- Patricia Tricia Cast (born 1966), American actress
- Tricia Chuah (born 1982), Malaysian professional squash player
- Tricia Cooke (born 1965), American editor, screenwriter and producer
- Patricia Tricia Cotham (born 1978), American politician
- Patricia Tricia Nixon Cox (born 1946), elder daughter of former US President Richard Nixon
- Tricia Cullop (born 1971), American women's college basketball head coach
- Tricia Dunn-Luoma (born 1974), American ice hockey player
- Tricia Fabbri, American basketball coach
- Tricia Flores (born 1979) long and triple jumper and sprinter from Belize
- Tricia Guild, British designer, entrepreneur and writer
- Tricia Helfer (born 1976), Canadian actress and model
- Tricia Hunter (born 1949), American politician
- Tricia Liston (born 1992), American basketball player
- Tricia MacGregor (born 1970), Canadian curler
- Patricia Tricia Marwick (born 1953), Scottish politician
- Tricia Middleton (born 1972), Canadian installation artist
- Patricia Tricia Penrose (born 1970), English actress and singer
- Patricia Tricia Santos (born 1995), Filipina volleyball player, actress and TV host
- Tricia Saunders (born 1966), American amateur wrestler
- Patricia Tricia Smith (born 1957), Canadian retired rower
- Tricia Springstubb (born 1950), American children's book author
- Tricia Stumpf (born 1970), American retired skeleton racer
- Tricia Sullivan (born 1968), American science fiction writer
- Patricia Tricia Walker (born 1964), British novelist
- Tricia Walsh-Smith (born 1956), English playwright and actress
- Tricia Watson, Barbadian politician
- Tricia Wright (born 1958), English darts player

== Fictional characters ==
- Patricia Tricia Armstrong, on the British soap opera Coronation Street
- Tricia Marie McMillan or Trillian (character), in The Hitchhiker's Guide to the Galaxy series
- Asian reporter Tricia Takinawa, in Family Guy

== Animals ==
- Tricia (elephant), an Asian elephant at the Perth Zoo

== See also ==
- Trisha
- Trish
