= Trish =

Trish is a feminine given name, often a contraction of Patricia. It may refer to:

== Persons ==
- Trish Adudu (born 1969), British freelance journalist, television presenter and DJ
- Trish Bartholomew (born 1986), Grenadian sprinter
- Trish Bertram, British television host and voice-over artist
- Trish Costello, American entrepreneur and businesswoman
- Trish Crossin (born 1956), Australian politician
- Trish Delaney-Brown, Australian singer and songwriter
- Trish Deseine, Northern Ireland food and cookbook author
- Trish Doan (1985–2017), Canadian musician, bass player for Kittie
- Trish Draper (born 1959), Australian politician
- Trish Flavel (born 1976), Australian Paralympic athlete
- Trish Godman (1939–2019), Scottish politician
- Trish Goff (born 1976), American model
- Trish Johnson (born 1966), English professional golfer
- Trish Karter, American entrepreneur and businesswoman
- Trish Keenan (1968–2011), English musician, front woman of Broadcast
- Trish Kissiar-Knight, American volleyball coach
- Trish La Chica, Filipino-born American politician
- Trish McKelvey (born 1942), New Zealand cricketer
- Trish Murphy, American singer-songwriter
- Trish Regan (born 1976), American television host, journalist, financial expert, and author
- Trish Salah, Canadian feminist writer and educator
- Trish Shields, Canadian poet and novelist
- Trish Sie, American choreographer and director
- Trish Stewart (born 1946), American television actress
- Trish Stratus (born 1975), Greek Canadian wrestler, former fitness model, actress and television personality
- Trish Suhr (born 1974), American standup comedian
- Trish Thuy Trang, Vietnamese American singer, and songwriter
- Trish Van Devere (born 1943), American actress
- Trish Vradenburg (1946–2017), American playwright, author, television writer, and Alzheimer’s Disease advocate
- Trish White (born 1964), Australian businesswoman and former politician
- Trish Williamson (1955–2007), English TV presenter, producer, and filmmaker
- Trish Worth (born 1946), Australian politician
- Trish Wylie, Irish author of romance novels

== Fictional characters ==
- Patricia "Trish" Carlin, a character in the American sitcom Living Dolls
- Patricia "Trish" Tracy, in the 1997 television movie On the 2nd Day of Christmas
- Trish (Devil May Cry), from the video game series Devil May Cry
- Trish, from the indie video game Goodbye Volcano High
- Trish, from the film Message from the King
- Trish Murtaugh, in the 1987 American buddy cop action movie Lethal Weapon
- Trish Piedmont, in the 2005 American romantic comedy movie The 40-Year-Old Virgin
- Trish Sackett, in the movie 13 Going on 30
- Trish Tilby, in the Marvel Comics Universe
- Trish Una, from Vento Aureo, the fifth story arc of the Japanese manga series "JoJo's Bizarre Adventure"
- Trish Wallace, in the UK soap opera Family Affairs
- Trish De La Rosa, from the Disney Channel Series Austin & Ally
- Trish Brown, (1992-2023) a goth character who always wears black and dark clothes. She was Shelby's killer.

== See also ==
- Trisha
- Tricia
