= Patrizia Rossi =

Nuclear physicist

Prof Patrizia Rossi
- Education: Sapienza University of Rome
- Scientific career
- Institutions: Jefferson Lab, INFN

Patrizia Rossi is a nuclear physicist. She is Deputy Associate Director for Nuclear Physics at Jefferson Lab, professor at George Washington University, and senior staff scientist at INFN.

== Early life and education ==
Rossi completed her Physics degree at Sapienza University of Rome in 1986 before doing a fellowship at INFN in 1988 and becoming a staff researcher in Laboratori Nazionali di Frascati (LNF-INFN) in 1990.

She joined Jefferson Lab in 1993, living near there 1996 to 1998.

== Career ==
Rossi became Deputy Associate Director for Nuclear Physics at Jefferson Lab in 2012, whilst remaining a senior staff scientist at LNF-INFN. She is also a research professor at George Washington University since 2023.

She is Managing Editor for Reviews and Letters to the Editors of European Physical Journal A (EPJ A) since 1 January 2022. She has served on multiple scientific committees, such as the High Energy Physics Advisory Panel (HEPAP).

She joined the Italian Scientistics and Scholars in North American Foundation (ISSNAF) Scientific Council in 2023.

Her research focusses on hadron and nuclear physics.

== Awards and honours ==
- 2024 – Fellow of the American Physical Society for "leading a scientific program to study the nucleon’s transverse momentum dependent parton distribution functions, including the development of a major particle detection system, and for visionary leadership in promoting the science of an energy-upgraded CEBAF accelerator at 22 GeV beam energy."
