= Florentine Houdinière =

French figure skater

Florentine Houdinière is a French international ice skater and choreographer. She won Sterren Dansen Op Het IJs (the Dutch version of Skating with Celebrities) as Hein Vergeer's partner and also appeared as the professional partner of journalist Donal MacIntyre on British television show Dancing on Ice. The pair finished second in the series. She has also skated in two shows for Disney on Ice, in Beauty and the Beast from 1996 to 1998 as Belle and in Magical Fantasy in 1998 as Cruella de Vil. She also skated as Anya in Anastasia on ice.

In 1992, Houdinière was the French National Junior Champion. She is bilingual, speaking both French and English. She has also choreographed a number of ice skating shows and has appeared in many others, such as Dancing on Ice and Disney on Ice.

In 2017, Florentine launched her company, La Compagnie by Florentine Houdinière, a platform of collaboration between skating and the arts, as well as a space for artistic and choreographic research. LCFH's debut launch video, TELIKÁ, is a live performance featuring the latest art form in dance & ice skating, blending both arts on the ice in the first ever duo created between a dancer and a skater. The piece is performed by artists Florentine Houdinière and Julien Marie-Anne in a moving story inspired by the myth of Odysseus and Penelope from the Odyssey. TELIKÁ is a 50 minute performance for theatres and festivals, and it can be performed from 10 to 45 minutes for special events.
