= Patrizia SE =

Investment manager in the real estate market across Europe

PATRIZIA SE

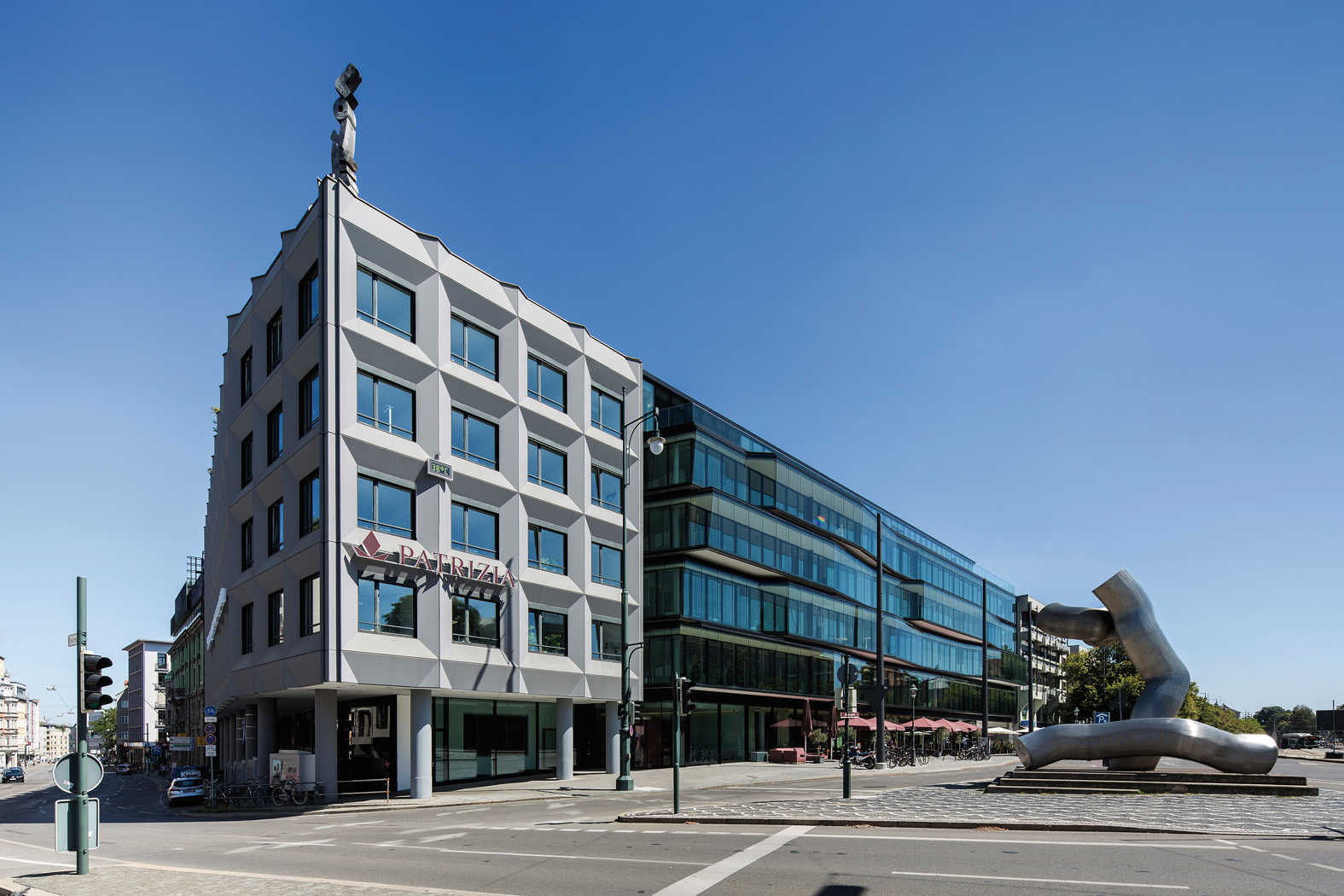
- Headquarters of Patrizia SE in Augsburg
- Type: Joint-stock company
- Traded as: FWB: PAT; SDAX Component
- ISIN: DE000PAT1AG3
- Industry: Real Estate Investment Management
- Founded: 1984; 42 years ago
- Headquarters: Augsburg, Germany
- Number of locations: 27
- Key people: Asoka Wöhrmann (CEO, Chairperson); Martin Praum (CFO); Wolfgang Egger (Founder); James Muir (Head of Investment Division); Konrad Finkenzeller (Head of Client Division)
- Products: Real estate investment management
- Revenue: 292,430,000 euro (2023)
- Operating income: −26,270,000 euro (2023)
- Net income: 5,770,000 euro (2023)
- AUM: €55.3 billion (Q1 2022)
- Total assets: 1,999,100,000 euro (2023)
- Number of employees: 997 (2023)
- Website: www.patrizia.ag

Patrizia (branded as PATRIZIA) is a German investment management company focused on the real estate market across Europe. Based in Augsburg, Germany, the company is listed on the Frankfurt stock exchange and, among others, is a member of the SDAX and MSCI World Small Cap Index.

The company has operations in several countries and offers investments in real estate and infrastructure assets for institutional, semi-professional and private investors. As of 2016, Patrizia managed more than EUR 55 billion of real estate and infrastructure assets, primarily as an investment manager for insurance companies, pension fund institutions, sovereign funds, savings and cooperative banks. The company employs over 1000 professionals based in 27 locations worldwide.

Since 2016, the company has also served private investors through its subsidiary Patrizia GrundInvest.

== History ==
The company was founded in 1984 by Wolfgang Egger. He gained his first experience of the real estate sector with a summer job on a construction site while in his teens. At the age of 19, he built a house, which he then went on to sell. He used the proceeds from the sale to buy Patrizia's first apartments. Within three years of its founding, Patrizia was privatizing 100 apartments per year. The company's focus was on Munich and Augsburg. Patrizia's strategy involved first buying apartments in Munich's Olympia-Pressestadt, along with apartments owned and used by Bayer AG and other companies, as well as large residential complexes in Augsburg, Obergiesing, Perlach and Schwabing before selling the apartments, primarily to their tenant occupants. Egger has since explained that one driving motivation was to turn tenants into homeowners. This gives individuals "financial freedom later in life and at the same creates value to society."

Following the company's IPO in 2006, Patrizia acquired residential real estate in major German cities and conurbations, expanding its portfolio to include around 13,000 apartments. At the same time, the company diversified its services and launched Spezialfonds (special funds) for institutional investors. In 2011, Patrizia took over Hamburger LB Immo Invest GmbH, an initiator of commercial real estate Spezialfonds, and went on to expand the business. A co-investment with a consortium of pension and insurance funds enabled Patrizia to acquire LBBW Immobilien GmbH (later: SÜDEWO), owner of around 21,500 apartments, for €1.435 billion in February 2012.

Led by Patrizia, a co-investment consortium of pension funds, insurance companies and savings banks acquired 92% of the shares in GBW AG (later: Dawonia)in April 2013. GBW AG's housing stock totaled approximately 32,000 apartments in Bavaria; the shares were acquired for €2.45 billion. With the takeover of the British Tamar Group the previous year, Patrizia simultaneously expanded its international operations.

After the integration of Rockspring Property Managers LLP, Triuva Kapitalverwaltungsgesellschaft mbH and Sparinvest under one common Patrizia brand in 2018, Patrizia acquired a strategic stake in Evana, an artificial intelligence business, as part of its stated goal of becoming "the technology leader in European real estate investment management." In January 2019, Patrizia announced the acquisition of Japan-based Kenzo Capital Corporation. Kenzo is an established local platform serving European clients interested in investing in Japanese residential real estate through a dedicated fund that was launched in 2017 in cooperation with Patrizia.

In May 2019, Patrizia took an equity interest of 10 per cent in Control.IT, a company that produces asset and portfolio management software. In June 2019, Patrizia Immobilien AG changed its legal name, in line with a resolution of that year's Annual General Meeting, to ‘PATRIZIA AG’. “The new name of the company and the renouncement of the German addendum Immobilien takes into account our stronger international orientation we have focused on for some time now,” commented Wolfgang Egger, CEO of PATRIZIA.

In recent years, Patrizia has focused on digitalisation, innovation and new technologies. Apart from the stake in Evana and Control.IT, Patrizia announced in October 2019 that it had obtained a strategic stake in Cognotekt, a Cologne-based artificial intelligence platform that has developed a unique technological approach for Natural Language Processing. Cognotekt's scientific technology is seen as having the potential to further enhance the operational and corporate data management processes of Patrizia in collaboration with Evana. Soon after Patrizia created a strategic partnership with WiredScore, a global rating scheme for digital connectivity across commercial and residential real estate.

In February 2020, Patrizia partnered with pioneering PropTech VC Pi Labs and has participated in Pi Labs’ third fund which will invest in early stage PropTech start-ups across Europe. In June 2020, the company entered into a partnership with Taronga Ventures in the close of its RealTech Ventures Fund, which invests into proptech in the Asia Pacific region. In November 2020, Patrizia expanded its global innovation ecosystem and scouting approach with an investment in the Camber Creek PropTech Venture Capital Fund. Camber Creek has a strong focus on North America.

In September 2021, Patrizia announced the acquisition of Whitehelm Capital, an international infrastructure manager, which triples Patrizia infrastructure AUM to circa EUR 5 billion. In June 2022, Patrizia announced it had raised €50 million to invest in the Sustainable Future Ventures (SFV), a new fund that invests in property technology that it believes will drive sustainability in the built environment. The SFV is the first in a new fund series .

“Another key pillar of our strategy is the continued focus on technology. We want to promote technologies within the PropTech industry that make the built environment more sustainable,” Christoph Glaser, the Chief Financial Officer, said.

== Criticism ==
The company was subject to public criticism in 1992 when, according to a report in Der Spiegel (37/1992 – 'Wie Augsburger Altbauten mit Hilfe von Asylbewerbern entmietet werden') Wolfgang Egger is reported as having said, “Every apartment that becomes vacant will be filled with asylum seekers.” ("Jede frei werdende Wohnung wird mit Asylanten belegt"), a statement that is reported to have unsettled residents of apartment buildings at Rote-Torwall-Straße 16 and Schülestraße 4 in Augsburg. Egger denied ever making the statement.

In 2004, Germany's largest pension fund, BVV, awarded Patrizia a mandate as property and asset manager of the BVV's real estate assets. During the same year Patrizia was in the firing line in Hamburg as it developed a Mövenpick Hotel in the former water tower in Sternschanzenpark despite questions surrounding the legitimacy of the project's building permits. Nevertheless, Patrizia later received two prestigious awards for the successful redesign and construction project, including the 2008 MIPIM Award.

== Recognition ==
Patrizia has received many awards over the years. Amongst the most notable are the two awards received for the redesign of the Mövenpick Hotel, in 2016, Patrizia won the Deal of the Decade (2006-2016) from PropertyEU. Patrizia received the MSCI 2018 for Best Performing Balanced Fund based on three-year NAV-level returns. In 2019, Patrizia received the MSCI award ‘Best Performing Balanced Fund in the PEPFI Index’ for The PanEuropean Property Limited Partnership (‘PanEuropean’). It was the second year in a row that Patrizia had received the award.

In February 2020, Wolfgang Egger received the ULI European Leadership Award. The award recognises industry leaders in Europe who have made significant contributions to urban development and real estate, along with civic and social endeavours.

In October 2021, the Patrizia Hanover Property Unit Trust won the AREF Investors’ Award for Outstanding Achievement, for thinking outside the box on how the fund could achieve net zero carbon and leadership in this area.

== Corporate structure ==
As part of the 2019 integration of Rockspring, Triuva and Sparinvest under one common brand, Patrizia changed its operating model to reflect the new pan-European structure dividing functions into global, pan-European and local functions. Wolfgang Egger, the founder, remains the majority shareholder and CEO of the company. Via his First Capital Partner investment company, he has held more than 51 per cent of Patrizia voting rights since 2011.

At the annual general meeting on 1 June 2022, over 99% of Patrizia shareholders approved the conversion of PATRIZIA from an AG structure to an SE (Societas Europaea) legal structure, the expansion of the board of directors. In addition, a new Executive Committee has been established to manage the company's growing product portfolio, larger business scope and increasing international reach and to support PATRIZIA's mid-term growth ambitions.

== Charitable foundation ==
Wolfgang Egger set up the PATRIZIA Foundation (former PATRIZIA KinderHaus Stiftung) as a charitable foundation in 1999. The PATRIZIA Foundation has helped over 250,000 children in need worldwide, giving them access to education and greater opportunities to lead better lives. The Foundation distinguishes itself by ensuring every euro donated goes 100% to the projects.
