= Patrizia Azzi =

Italian physicist

Patrizia Azzi is an Italian physicist best known for her involvement in the discovery of the top quark and Higgs boson. She is a senior researcher at the Istituto Nazionale di Fisica Nucleare (INFN) Padova division and was included in the 100 Women Against Stereotypes (#100esperte) project, a showcase of 100 female Italian experts meant to promote female expertise in traditionally male-dominated fields.

== Life and career ==
Patrizia Azzi is from Desenzano del Garda in Lombardy and attended the University of Padova. In 1991, she moved to Chicago from Italy and began working at Fermilab where she worked in the CDF collaboration, where she participated in the discovery of the top quark in 1995. The next year, Azzi received her PhD in physics. In 1993, she married fellow physicist Nicola Bacchetta in Verona, Italy. They have three kids. She ran the Top Physics Group at Fermilab from 2002 to 2004, measuring the properties of the top quark. Azzi moved to Geneva in 2005, where she and her husband both joined the CMS experiment at CERN. There, she worked on the quality and precision of the data that was used in the discovery of the Higgs boson.

At the INFN Padova division, Azzi is a senior researcher in the Department of Physics and Astronomy. She is also a fellow of the American Physical Society. Azzi has participated in the 100 Women Against Stereotypes (#100esperte) project since 2016. Her profile is included in an online database of female experts created by the project. According to Azzi, the project's list of experts is for journalists, meant to combat the prevalence of male experts in media. She believes that showcasing successful women in science will encourage future generations of young women to take an interest in the sciences. Azzi also participated in the multidisciplinary "Una vita da scienziata" ("Life as female scientist") exhibition. She was photographed for the exhibition by Gérard Bruneau. The exhibition took place in Milan at the Centro Diagnostico Italiano (CDI) from January sixteenth to June thirtieth in 2019.

In 2022, Azzi signed the "Statement of solidarity with women in Iran" alongside 2,629 other women and allies in STEM fields. In 2024, she was elected Fellow of the American Physical Society "for contributions to experimental particle physics and influence on international physics collaborations, particularly in leadership roles at CERN and engagement in global scientific communities".

== Selected publications ==
- Abe, F.; et al. (3 April 1995). "Observation of Top Quark Production in p̄p Collisions with the Collider Detector at Fermilab". Physical Review Letters. 74 (14): 2626–2631. arXiv:hep-ex/9503002. Bibcode:1995PhRvL..74.2626A. doi:10.1103/PhysRevLett.74.2626. PMID 10057978.
- Collaboration, The CMS; et al. (14 Aug 2008). "The CMS experiment at the CERN LHC". Journal of Instrumentation. 3 (8) S08004. Bibcode:2008JInst...3S8004C. doi:10.1088/1748-0221/3/08/S08004. hdl:11449/24216.
- Khachatryan, V.; et al. (27 September 2010). "Observation of long-range, near-side angular correlations in proton-proton collisions at the LHC". Journal of High Energy Physics. 2010 (9) 91. arXiv:1009.4122. Bibcode:2010JHEP...09..091K. doi:10.1007/JHEP09(2010)091. ISSN 1029-8479.
- "Measurement of the inclusive W and Z production cross sections in pp collisions at √s = 7 TeV with the CMS experiment". Journal of High Energy Physics. 2011 (10). 27 October 2011. arXiv:1107.4789. doi:10.1007/JHEP10(2011)132.
- Chatrchyan, S.; et al. (17 September 2012). "Observation of a new boson at a mass of 125 GeV with the CMS experiment at the LHC". Physics Letters B. 716 (1): 30–61. arXiv:1207.7235. Bibcode:2012PhLB..716...30C. doi:10.1016/j.physletb.2012.08.021. ISSN 0370-2693 – via Elsevier Science Direct.
- Khachatryan, V.; et al. (14 May 2015). "Precise determination of the mass of the Higgs boson and tests of compatibility of its couplings with the standard model predictions using proton collisions at 7 and 8 TeV". The European Physical Journal C. 75 (5): 5. arXiv:1412.8662. Bibcode:2015EPJC...75..212K. doi:10.1140/epjc/s10052-015-3351-7. PMC 4433454. PMID 25999783.
- Sirunyan, A.M.; et al. (6 October 2017). "Particle-flow reconstruction and global event description with the CMS detector". Journal of Instrumentation. 12 (10) P10003. arXiv:1706.04965. Bibcode:2017JInst..12P0003S. doi:10.1088/1748-0221/12/10/P10003. ISSN 1748-0221.
