= Patricia Bracewell =

American author of historical fiction (born 1950)

Patricia Bracewell (born January 19, 1950) is an American author of historical fiction. She grew up in California where she taught literature and composition before embarking upon her writing career. She earned a bachelor of arts degree in English literature from Loyola Marymount University and obtained a master's degree in the subject from University of California, Santa Barbara.

Her principal work is the 2013 historical novel Shadow On The Crown published by Viking/Penguin in the U.S. and by Harper/Collins in the U.K. According to WorldCat, the book is held in 746 libraries. The book was reviewed by the Lancashire Evening Post, and Publishers Weekly and Deseret News. It has been translated into Italian as L'ombra sulla corona and into German as Die Normannin .

This is the first book in a trilogy about Emma of Normandy. The second book in the trilogy is The Price of Blood, published by Viking in 2015. The final book in the trilogy, The Steel Beneath the Silk, was published by Bellastoria Press in March 2021.
