= Pat Lundvall =

Nebraskan lawyer

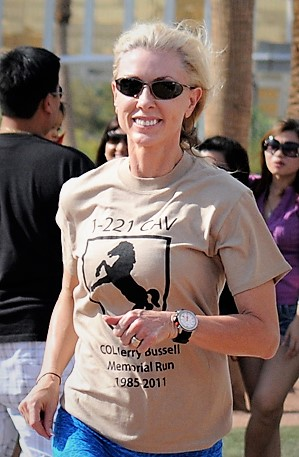
- Lundvall at the 2011 Wildhorse Commemorative Run in honor of her deceased husband, Colonel Jerry Bussell

Nevada State Athletic Commissioner
- In office 2007–2016

Personal details
- Born: Patricia Lundvall Oakland, Nebraska, United States
- Education: University of Nebraska–Lincoln; McGeorge School of Law
- Occupation: Lawyer

Patricia Lundvall is an American lawyer and former commissioner of the Nevada State Athletic Commission (NSAC). She was called to the bar in Nevada and became the first female chair of the NSAC.

== Early life ==
Lundvall grew up in Oakland, Nebraska. She studied for a master's degree in exercise sciences at the University of Nebraska–Lincoln before studying law at the McGeorge School of Law, graduating as the valedictorian of her class.

She was admitted to the bar in Nevada in 1989 and later to the bar of the United States Court of Appeals for the Ninth Circuit and the Supreme Court of the United States. In 2001, she successfully represented radio DJ Rusty Humphries against Citadel Broadcasting.

== Athletic Commissioner ==
In 2007, Lundvall was appointed as the new commissioner to the Nevada State Athletic Commission by the Governor of Nevada Jim Gibbons. Only one other female had previously served on NSAC: Amy Ayoub served as commissioner from 1999 to 2002. She served three three-year terms as a NSAC commissioner before not being reappointed in 2016. She was elected as chairwoman of the Commission in 2009, becoming the first female chair in their history. During her time as commissioner, she received attention for some of her rulings in relation to mixed martial arts (MMA) in the state which some MMA officials and fans found controversial. In 2014, she sentenced Wanderlei Silva to be banned from MMA for life for evading a drugs test. The ban was overturned by the Nevada District Court for being "arbitrary, capricious and not supported by substantial evidence."

In 2015, she sentenced Nick Diaz to a 5-year ban from MMA for testing positive for cannabis after her initial suggestion of a lifetime ban was overruled by the rest of the commissioners. The Diaz ruling was overturned on appeal and Lundvall was accused of "animosity" towards Diaz. In 2016, she sentenced Conor McGregor to 50 hours community service, a $150,000 fine and required him to shoot an anti-bullying video after getting involved in a fracas with his UFC 202 opponent Nate Diaz at a press conference with both sides throwing water bottles at each other. This came after the Attorney General of Nevada suggested a $25,000 fine and 25 hours community service, with Lundvall justifying her decision by saying McGregor "...needed to be humbled". In response, McGregor said he would not fight in Nevada again. Later that year, Governor Brian Sandoval elected not to reappoint Lundvall to the commission.

== Post-commissionership ==
Following leaving the NSAC, Lundvall returned to practicing law for McDonald Carano. In 2019, she was recognized for her work with Nevadan-based military charities in the Las Vegas area. In 2020, she was nominated for a Best Lawyers in America award for her work on commercial litigation.

== Personal life ==
Lundvall was married to Jerry Bussell for 28 years until his death in 2010. Bussell was a Colonel in the Nevada National Guard, known for the "Cavalry Death March" training exercise of June 1985, leading the 1/221st Cavalry across the Mojave Desert from the Henderson Armory in Nevada to Fort Irwin, California. On May 22, 2011, the Nevada National Guard held a 135 mile commemorative relay run in his honor.
