= Anastasia on Ice =

Anastasia on Ice is an ice show based on the 1997 Fox Animation Studios animated film Anastasia that premiered in 1998. It was produced by Feld Entertainment, who had previously worked on Ringling Bros. and Barnum & Bailey and Disney on Ice. Fox obtained a retroactive license for Anastasia on Ice.

Speaking of "Once Upon a December"'s translation to the stage, choreographer Sarah Kawahara said, "you enter into a kind of fantasy, magical quality, rather than thinking back on a time of terror...I was able to take [the film's] fantasy elements and make then come true". Noting the suitability of Anastasia for an ice show, she noted that "every main character has a song. Plus, there are great pieces written for musical moments that push the story along".

The Sun Sentinel deemed it "lavish", while Daily News wrote it a "colorful adventure story". Harfort Courant suggested the audience would "revel in the lively explosions and menacing squadron of bats that spice the production". Meanwhile, St. Louis Post-Dispatch noted that the historical story's brutality made it a strange fit for a children's ice show.
