= Laurence Crouzet =

French voice actress (1961–2026)

- Born: 31 March 1961; France
- Died: 11 November 2026 (aged 65)
- Occupation: Voice actress
- Years active: 1984–2026

Laurence Crouzet (French: [loʁˈɑ̃s kʁuzˈɛ]; 31 March 1961 – 11 November 2026) was a French voice actress.

The primary French voice of Uma Thurman and Madonna, she once won the Prix de l'humour au Festival de Conflans-Sainte-Honorine. Crouzet's other dubbing roles include Shaina in Saint Seiya and April O'Neil in Teenage Mutant Ninja Turtles. On the stage, she appeared in a 1985 production of The Eternal Husband at the Théâtre du Marais in Paris.

Crouzet died on 11 November 2026, at the age of 65.

== Filmography ==
=== Television ===
- Les Enfants du mensonge (1996)
