= Patrizia Scianca =

Italian voice actress

Patrizia Scianca is an Italian voice actress and actress from Turin who has dubbed over a number of notable roles in anime.

Graduated in law and qualified as a swimming instructor, she is active in dubbing companies in Milan and is a member of ADAP. She is particularly flexible, having also voiced both female and male childhood characters in her career, including Son Goku, Son Gohan and Son Goten as children during the Dragon Ball series and films, Nico Robin in One Piece and Arale Norimaki in Dr. Slump. She has also had some experience as a dialogue writer.

== Roles ==
=== Television animation ===
- The Adventures of Jimmy Neutron: Boy Genius (Judy Neutron (Megan Cavanagh))
- Bakusō Kyōdai Let's & Go!! (Go Seiba (Haruna Ikezawa))
- City Hunter (Saeko Nogami (Yōko Asagami))
- Doraemon (Suneo)
- Dragon Ball (Son Goku, Son Gohan and Son Goten as children (Masako Nozawa))
- Dr. Slump (second anime and second dub of the first one) (Arale Norimaki (Taeko Kawata, Mami Koyama))
- Fullmetal Alchemist (Edward Elric as a child (Romi Park))
- Kodocha (Tsuyoshi Ohki (Mayumi Misawa))
- Marmalade Boy (Chiyako (Hiroko Emori))
- Mermaid Melody Pichi Pichi Pitch (Izul)
- Mirmo! (Yashichi (Yukiji))
- My Life as a Teenage Robot (Tuck (Audrey Wasilewski))
- Ojamajo Doremi (Majorika (Naomi Nagasawa))
- One Piece (Monkey D. Luffy as a child (Mayumi Tanaka), Tamanegi (Makiko Ōmoto) and Nico Robin (Yuriko Yamaguchi)
- Rocket Power (Maurice "Twister" Rodriguez (Ulysses Cuadra))
- Sailor Moon (Sailor Neptune (Masako Katsuki))
- Sonic the Hedgehog (Bunnie Rabbot (Christine Cavanaugh))
- Shaman King (Manta Oyamada)
- Tokyo Mew Mew (Zakuro Fujiwara (Junko Noda))
- Dandadan (Turbo Granny (Mayumi Tanaka))

=== Theatrical animation ===
- Balto II: Wolf Quest (Saba (Melanie Spore))
- Dead End Adventure (Nico Robin)

== Bibliography ==
- (in Italian) Patrizia Scianca at Il mondo dei doppiatori
- Patrizia Scianca at Anime News Network's encyclopedia
