= Trisha Suppes =

American professor of psychiatry

Trisha Suppes is a professor at Stanford University in the School of Medicine, Department of Psychiatry and Behavioral Sciences. She also works at the VA Palo Alto Health Care System as director of the Bipolar and Depression Research Program. She is noted for being an expert in the treatment and management of bipolar disorder. She been the author or co-author of over 200 peer-reviewed articles and has written numerous academic textbooks for the treatment of Bipolar Disorder. Suppes' recent work includes exploring the biological basis of mood disorders.

== Education ==
Suppes earned her MD at Dartmouth Medical School in Hanover, New Hampshire, and went on to earn a PhD in anatomy and physiology at the University of California, Los Angeles. Post graduation medical school, her residency in adult psychiatry was completed at McLean Hospital in Belmont, Massachusetts. She completed a postdoctoral fellowship in neurology at Stanford University School of Medicine.
