= Patricia Tudor Sandahl =

Swedish writer (born 1940)

Patricia Ann Tudor Sandahl
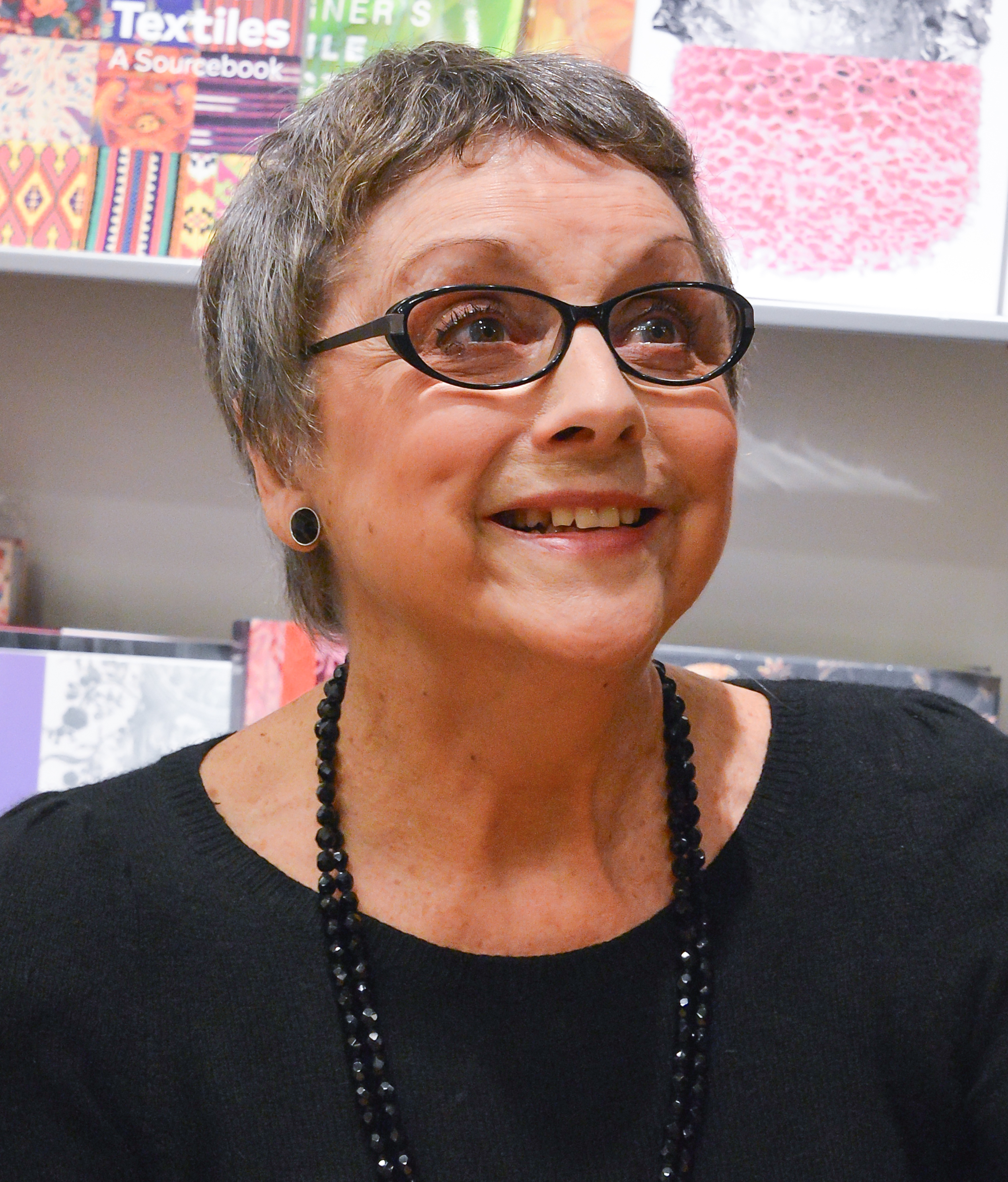
- Sandahl in 2012
- Born: Patricia Howard; 19 July 1940 (age 85); Manchester, England
- Other name: Patricia Rosén
- Occupations: Psychotherapist and author
- Spouse: Christer Sandahl

Patricia Ann Tudor Sandahl, née Howard, also Rosén from previous marriage (born 19 July 1940 in Manchester, England) is a Swedish psychotherapist and author. She is a doctor in philosophy and pedagogics, and a philosophy licentiat in sociology, psychologist. Sandahl is a retreat-leader for the Stiftelsen Berget in Rättvik, Sweden.

In 1981, she married professor Christer Sandahl.

== Bibliography ==
- Om barnet inom oss. 1983. ISBN 91-38-90276-1.
- Det glömda självet. 1989. ISBN 91-38-90276-1.
- Det omöjliga yrket. 1990. ISBN 91-46-21034-2.
- Den fängslande verkligheten. 1992. ISBN 91-46-16158-9.
- Ett himla liv, självbiografi. 1996. ISBN 91-46-16858-3.
- Ordet är ditt. 1997. ISBN 91-46-17087-1.
- Den tredje åldern. 1999. ISBN 91-46-17425-7.
- Ett himla liv: En självbiografisk berättelse. 2002. Översättning: Gun Zetterström
- Daisan no nenrei o ikiru. Koreika shakai, feminizumu no senshinkoku Suweden kara. Kurube Noriko, yaku. 2004. ISBN 4-87525-221-8.
- Das Leben ist ein langer Fluss. über das Älterwerden. Aus dem Schwed. von Sigrid Irimia. 2004. ISBN 3-451-28065-5.
- Kolmas ikä/suomennos. Oili Räsänen. 2006. ISBN 951-607-300-X.
- Tid att vara ensam. 2002. ISBN 91-46-18289-6.
- Verabredung mit mir selbst. von der Kraft, die im Alleinsein liegt/aus dem Schwedischen von Sigrid Irimia. 2005. ISBN 3-451-28349-2.
- Eftertankar. 2003. ISBN 91-46-20234-X.
- En given väg. 2005. ISBN 91-46-21097-0.
- Finde zu dir selbst. vom Sinn im Leben und von der Weisheit des eigenen Wegs/aus dem Schwedischen von Sigrid Irimia. 2006. ISBN 3-451-29034-0.
- I tacksamhetens tecken. 2007. ISBN 978-91-46-21730-5.
- Tid för förändring. 2009. ISBN 91-7337-097-5
- Den fjärde åldern. 2009. ISBN 978-91-7337-229-9
- Din egen väg. 2013. ISBN 978-91-7387-289-8
