= Royal Manitoba Theatre Centre production history =

History of regional Canadian theatre

This production history of the Royal Manitoba Theatre Centre (RMTC) is a chronological list of the Mainstage, Warehouse, and Regional Tour productions that have been staged since RMTC's inception.

The RMTC is Canada's oldest English-language regional theatre. It was founded in 1958 by John Hirsch and Tom Hendry as an amalgamation of the Winnipeg Little Theatre and Theatre 77, and was known as the Manitoba Theatre Centre until receiving its royal designation in 2010.

== 20th century ==
=== 1958–1959 ===
- A Hatful of Rain by Michael V. Gazzo
- The Glass Menagerie by Tennessee Williams
- Ring Round the Moon adapted by Christopher Fry, based on the play Invitation to the Castle by Jean Anouilh
- Of Mice and Men by John Steinbeck
- Blithe Spirit by Noël Coward
- Teach Me How to Cry by Patricia Joudry
- Born Yesterday by Garson Kanin
- The Diary of Anne Frank dramatized by Frances Goodrich and Albert Hackett, based upon the book Anne Frank: The Diary of a Young Girl

=== 1959–1960 ===
- Solid Gold Cadillac by Howard Teichmann and George S. Kaufman
- Tea and Sympathy by Robert Anderson
- On Borrowed Time by Paul Osborn, based on the novel by Lawrence Edward Watkin
- Reclining Figure by Harry Kurnitz
- Look Back in Anger by John Osborne
- Volpone by Ben Jonson
- Teahouse of the August Moon by John Patrick, based on a novel by Vern J. Sneider
- Anastasia by Marcelle Maurette

=== 1960–1961 ===
- Mr. Roberts by Joshua Logan, based on the novel by Thomas Heggen
- Gaslight by Patrick Hamilton
- A Streetcar Named Desire by Tennessee Williams
- Biggest Thief in Town by Dalton Trumbo
- Dark of the Moon by William Berney and Howard Richardson
- Juno and the Paycock by Seán O'Casey
- Visit to a Small Planet by Gore Vidal
- Four Poster by Jan de Hartog
- The Lesson by Eugène Ionesco
- The Marriage Proposal by Anton Chekhov
- Oh Dad, Poor Dad, Mama's Hung You in the Closet and I'm Feelin' So Sad by Arthur Kopit
- Under Milk Wood by Dylan Thomas

=== 1961–1962 ===
- The Lady's Not for Burning by Christopher Fry
- Speaking of Murder by Audrey Roos and William Roos
- The Playboy of the Western World by J. M. Synge
- Arms and the Man by George Bernard Shaw
- The Boy Friend music, book, and lyrics by Sandy Wilson
- Separate Tables by Terence Rattigan
- Thieves' Carnival by Jean Anouilh
- Look Ahead! by Len Peterson
- Waiting for Godot by Samuel Beckett

=== 1962–1963 ===
- Bonfires of 1962 by Neil Harris, Eric Donkin, Mort Forer, Goldie Gelmon, Tom Hendry, Chuck Thompson, Marilyn Gardner, Paddy Armstrong and Murray Grand
- Once More, with Feeling! by Harry Kurnitz
- A Very Close Family by Bernard Slade
- An Enemy of the People by Henrik Ibsen
- Mrs. Warren's Profession by George Bernard Shaw
- Pal Joey music by Richard Rodgers, lyrics by Lorenz Hart, and book by John O'Hara
- Summer of the Seventeenth Doll by Ray Lawler
- The Caretaker by Harold Pinter
- The Spirit of the People is a Sometime Thing by Jack Ofield
- The Love Merchants by Jack Ofield

=== 1963–1964 ===
- Private Lives by Noël Coward
- Pygmalion by George Bernard Shaw
- The Hostage by Brendan Behan
- A Midsummer Night's Dream by William Shakespeare
- Little Mary Sunshine music, lyrics, and book by Rick Besoyan
- Five Finger Exercise by Peter Shaffer
- The Gazebo by Alec Coppel
- Cat on a Hot Tin Roof by Tennessee Williams
- Ding Dong Dell, Dandin's in the Well adapted by Betty Jane Wylie from the comedy George Dandin by Moliere
- Endgame by Samuel Beckett

=== 1964–1965 ===
- Hay Fever by Noël Coward
- All About Us by Len Peterson
- Mother Courage by Bertolt Brecht, English adaptation by Eric Bentley
- The Taming of the Shrew by William Shakespeare
- Irma La Douce book and lyrics by Alexandre Breffort, music by Marguerite Monnot, English book & lyrics by Julian More, David Heneker, and Monty Norman.
- Heartbreak House by George Bernard Shaw
- Who's Afraid of Virginia Woolf? by Edward Albee
- The Typists and the Tiger by Murray Schisgal

=== 1965–1966 ===
- The Private Ear and The Public Eye by Peter Schaffer
- The Importance of Being Earnest by Oscar Wilde
- Andorra by Max Frisch
- The Tempest by William Shakespeare
- The Threepenny Opera by Bertolt Brecht and Kurt Weill
- Nicholas Romanov by William Kinsolving
- The Fantasticks music by Harvey Schmidt, lyrics by Tom Jones
- The Dance of Death by August Strindberg, translation by Elizabeth Sprigge

=== 1966–1967 ===
- Charley's Aunt by Brandon Thomas
- The Rainmaker by N. Richard Nash
- Galileo by Bertolt Brecht
- A Funny Thing Happened on the Way to the Forum music and lyrics by Stephen Sondheim, book by Burt Shevelove and Larry Gelbart
- Romeo and Juliet by William Shakespeare
- Lulu Street by Ann Henry
- Luv by Murray Schisgal

=== 1967–1968 ===
- Major Barbara by George Bernard Shaw
- Oh, What a Lovely War! by Joan Littlewood
- Antigone by Sophocles
- Sganarelle by Molière, English version by Miles Malleson
- Three Sisters by Anton Chekhov
- The Fantasticks, music by Harvey Schmidt, lyrics by Tom Jones
- A Thousand Clowns by Herb Gardner
- A Delicate Balance by Edward Albee

=== 1968–1969 ===
- Fiddler on the Roof book by Joseph Stein, music by Jerry Bock, lyrics by Sheldon Harnick,
- A Man for All Seasons by Robert Bolt
- Hotel Paradiso by Georges Feydeau and Maurice Desvallieres, translation by Peter Glenville
- Cactus Flower by Abe Burrows, based on the play Fleur de cactus by Pierre Barillet and Jean-Pierre Gredy
- Happy Days by Samuel Beckett
- Exit the King by Eugene Ionesco
- The School for Wives by Molière
- Red Magic by Michel de Ghelderode, translation by George Hauger
- Fortune and Men's Eyes by John Herbert
- Home Free by Lanford Wilson
- The Zoo Story by Edward Albee
- How the Puppets Formed a Government by Theatre Across the Street

=== 1969–1970 ===
- Man of La Mancha, book by Dale Wasserman, lyrics by Joe Darion, music by Mitch Leigh
- Cabaret, book by Joe Masteroff, lyrics by Fred Ebb, John Van Druten, and Christopher Isherwood, music by John Kander
- Marat/Sade by Peter Weiss, translation by Geoffrey Skelton and Adrian Mitchell
- You Can't Take It with You by Moss Hart and George S. Kaufman
- After the Fall by Arthur Miller
- Hail Scrawdyke! by David Halliwell
- Harry, Noon and Night by Ronald Ribman
- Mandragola by Niccolò Machiavelli, translation by J. R. Hale
- La Ronde by Arthur Schnitzler
- Escurial by Michel de Ghelderode
- The Indian Wants the Bronx by Israel Horovitz
- La Turista by Sam Shepard

=== 1970–1971 ===
- A Man's a Man by Bertolt Brecht
- Long Day's Journey Into Night by Eugene O'Neill
- Salvation by Peter Link, book, music & lyrics by C.C. Courtney
- Hobson's Choice by Harold Brighouse
- War and Peace by Alfred Neumann and Erwin Piscator, adapted by Guntram Prufer and Leo Tolstoy from the novel War and Peace by Leo Tolstoy, translation by Robert David MacDonald
- Little Murders by Jules Feiffer
- The Sun Never Sets by Patrick Crean
- Tomorrow is St. Valentine's Day by William Shakespeare

=== 1971–1972 ===
- What the Butler Saw by Joe Orton
- Alice Through the Looking-Glass by Lewis Carroll, adapted by Keith Turnball, music by Allan Laing
- The Homecoming by Harold Pinter
- The Sun and the Moon by James Reaney
- Lady Frederick by W. Somerset Maugham
- The Comedy of Errors by William Shakespeare
- Head 'Em Off at the Pas by John Wood

=== 1972–1973 ===
- A Streetcar Named Desire by Tennessee Williams
- Sleuth by Anthony Shaffer
- A Thurber Carnival by James Thurber
- Hedda Gabler by Henrik Ibsen
- Guys and Dolls book by Jo Swerling and Abe Burrows, music and lyrics by Frank Loesser
- Hamlet by William Shakespeare
- Rosencrantz and Guildenstern Are Dead by Tom Stoppard
- The Promise by Aleksei Arbuzov
- En Pièces Detachées by Michel Tremblay, translation by Allan Van Meer
- Jacques Brel Is Alive and Well and Living in Paris by Jacques Brel, English lyrics & additional material by Eric Blau and Mort Shuman
- Wedding in White by William Fruet

=== 1973–1974 ===
- You Never Can Tell by George Bernard Shaw
- A Day in the Death of Joe Egg by Peter Nichols
- The Dybbuk by Sholem Anksy, adapted by John Hirsch
- Godspell by John-Michael Tebelak, music and lyrics by Stephen Schwartz
- The Plough and the Stars by Seán O'Casey
- Indian by George Ryga
- Black Comedy by Peter Schaffer
- Mime Over Five by Canadian Mime Theatre
- Esker Mike and His Wife Agiluk by Herschel Hardin
- You're Gonna be Alright, Jamie-Boy by David Freeman
- Jubalay by Patrick Rose and Merv Campone

=== 1974–1975 ===
- The Sunshine Boys by Neil Simon
- The Cherry Orchard by Anton Chekhov, translation by David Magarshack
- The Boy Friend by Sandy Wilson
- Forget-Me-Not-Lane by Peter Nichols
- Red Emma, Queen of the Anarchists by Carol Bolt
- Trelawny of the "Wells" by Arthur Wing Pinero
- Old Times by Harold Pinter
- Hosanna by Michel Tremblay, translation by John Van Burek and Bill Glassco
- The Knack by Ann Jellicoe
- Crabdance by Beverley Simons

=== 1975–1976 ===
- Cyrano de Bergerac by Edmond Rostand, translation and adaptation by Anthony Burgess
- The Price by Arthur Miller
- Equus by Peter Shaffer
- Company by George Furth, music and lyrics by Stephen sondhein
- Of Mice and Men by John Steinbeck
- Private Lives by Noël Coward
- The Collected Works of Billy The Kid by Michael Ondaatje
- Theatre Beyond Words by Canadian Mime Theatre
- Endgame by Samuel Beckett
- Creeps by David Freeman

=== 1976–1977 ===
- Twelfth Night by William Shakespeare
- All Over by Edward Albee
- Relatively Speaking by Alan Ayckbourn
- Dames at Sea book and lyrics by George Haimsohn and Robin Miller, music by Jim Wise
- The Crucible by Arthur Miller
- She Stoops to Conquer by Oliver Goldsmith
- Berlin to Broadway with Kurt Weill lyrics by Maxwell Anderson, Marc Blitzstein, Bertolt Brecht, Jacques Deval, Michael Feingold, Ira Gershwin, Paul Green, Langston Hughes, Alan Jay Lerner, Ogden Nash, George Tabori, and Arnold Weinstein, music by Kurt Weill, text and format by Gene Lerner
- Canadian Gothic by Joanna M. Glass
- American Modern by Joanna M. Glass
- Waiting for Godot by Samuel Beckett
- Alpha Beta by E.A. Whitehead
- Fables Here and Then by David Feldshuh

=== 1977–1978 ===
- The Last Chalice by Joanna M. Glass
- Knock Knock by Jules Feiffer
- The Contractor by David Storey
- The Night of the Iguana by Tennessee Williams
- Measure for Measure by William Shakespeare
- The Royal Hunt of the Sun by Peter Shaffer
- Hello and Goodbye by Athol Fugard
- Oh Coward! words and music by Noël Coward, devised by Roderick Cook
- Love is Meant to Make us Glad by David Brown and Pat Galloway
- The Sea Horse by Edward J. Moore
- Ashes by David Rudkin
- For Love and Chicken Soup by Brad Leiman

=== 1978–1979 ===
- A Midsummer Night's Dream by William Shakespeare
- A Doll's House by Henrik Ibsen, translation by John Lingard
- How the Other Half Loves by Alan Ayckbourn
- Death of a Salesman by Arthur Miller
- Veronica's Room by Ira Levin
- A Bee in her Bonnet by Georges Feydeau, translation by Brian Blakey
- Forever Yours, Marie-Lou by Michel Tremblay
- Theatre Beyond Words by Theatre Beyond Words
- The Zoo Story by Edward Albee
- Sexual Perversity in Chicago by David Mamet
- Sizwe Bansi is Dead by Athol Fugard

=== 1979–1980 ===
- Travesties by Tom Stoppard
- Artichoke by Joanna M. Glass
- Absurd Person Singular by Alan Ayckbourn
- The Seagull by Anton Chekhov, translation and adaptation by Arif Hasnain
- The Diary of Anne Frank, a dramatization by Frances Goodrich & Albert Hackett
- Dracula, dramatized by Hamilton Deane & John L. Balderston from the novel by Bram Stoker
- American Buffalo by David Mamet
- Circus Gothic by Jan Kudelka
- Waiting for the Parade by John Murrell
- Talley's Folly by Lanford Wilson
- Spokesong by Stewart Parker

=== 1980–1981 ===
- Billy Bishop Goes to War by John MacLachlan Gray and Eric Peterson
- Jitters by David French
- Balconville by David Fennario
- Grease by Jim Jacobs and Warren Casey
- The Elephant Man by Bernard Pomerance
- As You Like It by William Shakespeare
- Betrayal by Harold Pinter
- Macbeth by William Shakespeare
- Bent by Martin Sherman
- 1837: The Farmers' Revolt by Rick Salutin and Theatre Passe Muraille

=== 1981–1982 ===
- Encore Brel! by Jacques Brel, English lyrics by Richard Ouzounian, Alasdair Clayre, Rod McKuen, and Paul Austen
- Candida by George Bernard Shaw
- The Black Bonspiel of Wullie MacCrimmon by W. O. Mitchell
- The Taming of the Shrew by William Shakespeare
- The Little Foxes by Lillian Hellman
- The Importance of Being Earnest by Oscar Wilde
- The Gin Game by D. L. Coburn
- The Tempest by William Shakespeare
- Thimblerig by Alf Silver
- A Moon for the Misbegotten by Eugene O'Neill
- Side by Side by Sondheim music and lyrics by Stephen Sondheim, Leonard Bernstein, Mary Rodgers, Richard Rodgers, and Jule Styne, by arrangement with Cameron Mackintosh
- Billy Bishop Goes to War by John Gray, in collaboration with Eric Peterson, Music and Lyrics by John Gray.

=== 1982–1983 ===
- Nicholas Nickleby by Charles Dickens, adapted by Richard Ouzounian
- Blood Relations by Sharon Pollock
- The Man Who Came to Dinner by Moss Hart and George S. Kaufman
- Richard III by William Shakespeare
- The Three Musketeers by Alexandre Dumas
- Mass Appeal by Bill C. Davis
- Fifth of July by Lanford Wilson
- How I Got That Story by Amlin Gray
- Paper Wheat by 25th Street Theatre
- Cloud 9 by Caryl Churchill
- Climate of the Times by Alf Silver

=== 1983–1984 ===
- The Mikado music by Arthur Sullivan, libretto by W. S. Gilbert
- A Tale of Two Cities by Charles Dickens, adapted for the stage by Richard Ouzounian
- Much Ado About Nothing by William Shakespeare
- The Duchess of Malfi by John Webster
- Bedroom Farce by Alan Ayckbourn
- The Dining Room by A.R. Gurney Jr.
- La Sagouine by Antonine Maillet
- The Actor's Nightmare by Christopher Durang
- Sister Mary Ignatius Explains It All for You by Christopher Durang
- Remember Me by Michel Tremblay, translation by John Stowe
- Clearances by Alf Silver, based on a scenario by Ian F. Ross
- Ten Lost Years by Barry Broadfoot

=== 1984–1985 ===
- Amadeus by Peter Shaffer
- Old World by Aleksei Arbuzov, translation by Adriadne Nicolaeff
- Quiet in the Land by Anne Chislett
- Born Yesterday by Garson Kanin
- Quartermaine's Terms by Simon Gray
- Tartuffe by Molière
- La Sagouine by Antonine Maillet, translation by Luis De Cespedes
- Sea Marks by Gardner McKay
- 'Night, Mother by Marsha Norman
- Beautiful Deeds by Marie-Lynn Hammond
- Automatic Pilot by Erika Ritter

=== 1985–1986 ===
- Barnum Music by Cy Coleman, lyrics by Michael Stewart, book by Mark Bramble
- The Real Thing by Tom Stoppard
- Tsymbaly by Ted Galay
- Talking Dirty by Sherman Snukal
- Hamlet by William Shakespeare
- Filthy Rich by George F. Walker
- Einstein by Gabriel Emanuel
- Fool for Love by Sam Shepard
- Once in a Million by T.H. Hatte
- The Last Doors' Bootleg by Alan Williams
- Garrison's Garage by Ted Johns

=== 1986–1987 ===
- Brighton Beach Memoirs by Neil Simon
- A Christmas Carol by Charles Dickens
- Mirandolina by Carlo Goldoni, translation and adapted by Olwen Wymark
- Doc by Sharon Pollock
- I'm Not Rappaport by Herb Gardner
- The Foreigner by Larry Shue
- The Double Bass by Patrick Süskind, translation by Roy Kift
- We Can't Pay? We Won't Pay! by Dario Fo
- Salt-Water Moon by David French
- Henry V by William Shakespeare
- Life After Hockey by Kenneth Brown

=== 1987–1988 ===
- Royalty is Royalty by W.O. Mitchell
- 101 Miracles of Hope Chance by Allan Stratton
- Ten Little Indians by Agatha Christie
- You Never Can Tell by George Bernard Shaw
- The Road to Mecca by Athol Fugard
- Morning's at Seven by Paul Osborn
- The Rez Sisters by Tomson Highway
- Letter From Wingfield Farm by Dan Needles
- Loot by Joe Orton
- The Unseen Hand by Sam Shepard
- Killer's Head by Sam Shepard
- The Club by Eve Merriam
- Life After Hockey by Kenneth Brown

=== 1988–1989 ===
- B-Movie, The Play by Tom Wood
- 1949 by David French
- Falstaff by William Shakespeare, adapted by Victor Cowie
- Woman in Mind by Alan Ayckbourn
- A View From the Bridge by Arthur Miller
- Brass Rubbings by Gordon Pinsent
- Frankie and Johnny in the Clair de Lune by Terrence McNally
- When That I Was by John Mortimer and Edward Atienza
- Life Skills by David King
- A Walk in the Woods by Lee Blessing
- Frankenstein: Playing with Fire adapted by Barbara Field from the novel by Mary Shelby
- The Mousetrap by Agatha Christie

=== 1989–1990 ===
- Broadway Bound by Neil Simon
- Emerald City by David Williamson
- Cat on a Hot Tin Roof by Tennessee Williams
- The Mousetrap by Agatha Christie
- Master Class by David Pownall
- You Can't Take It With You by George S. Kaufman & Moss Hart
- Kiss of the Spider Woman by Manuel Puig
- Beautiful Lake Winnipeg by Maureen Hunter
- Driving Miss Daisy by Alfred Uhry
- The Dragons' Trilogy by Le Théâtre Repere
- The Glass Menagerie by Tennessee Williams

=== 1990–1991 ===
- The Heidi Chronicles by Wendy Wasserstein
- Macbeth by William Shakespeare
- Noises Off by Michael Frayn
- Sherlock Holmes and the Speckled Band by Arthur Conan Doyle
- Of the Fields, Lately by David French
- Les Misérables by Alain Boublil and Claude-Michel Schönberg, based on the novel by Victor Hugo, music by Claude-Michel Schönberg, French lyrics by Alain Boublil, English lyrics by Herbert Kretzmer, original French text by Alain Boublil and Jean-Marc Natel
- Dry Lips Oughta Move to Kapuskasing by Tomson Highway
- Toronto, Mississippi by Joan MacLeod
- Burn This by Lanford Wilson
- My Children! My Africa! by Athol Fugard
- Letter from Wingfield Farm by Dan Needles

=== 1991–1992 ===
- M. Butterfly by David Henry Hwang
- Hedda Gabler by Henrik Ibsen, new translation by Per Brask
- Not Wanted on the Voyage by Timothy Findley
- Lend Me a Tenor by Ken Ludwig
- Shirley Valentine by Willy Russell
- The Miracle Worker by William Gibson
- Wingfield Trilogy by Dan Needles
- Goodnight Desdemona (Good Morning Juliet) by Ann Marie MacDonald
- The Affections of May by Norm Foster
- Medea by Euripides, freely adapted by Robinson Jeffers

=== 1992–1993 ===
- Another Time by Ronald Harwood
- A Midsummer Night's Dream by William Shakespeare
- Transit of Venus by Maureen Hunter
- Arsenic and Old Lace by Joseph Kesselring
- Democracy by John Murrell
- Lost in Yonkers by Neil Simon
- Unidentified Human Remains and the True Nature of Love by Brad Fraser
- Death and the Maiden by Ariel Dorfman
- Gunmetal Blues by Richard March and Marion Adler
- Steel Magnolias by Robert Harling
- Letter From Wingfield Farmby Dan Needles

=== 1993–1994 ===
- Dancing at Lughnasa by Brian Friel
- A Christmas Carol - The Musical by Mavor Moore, based upon the novel by Charles Dickens
- Wait Until Dark by Frederick Knott
- Henceforward... by Alan Ayckbourn
- Hay Fever by Noël Coward
- Wingfield's Folly by Dan Needles
- Lips Together, Teeth Apart by Terrence McNally
- Awful Manors by Ronnie Burkett
- Mrs. Klein by Nicholas Wright
- The Search for Signs of Intelligent Life in the Universe by Jane Wagner
- Steel Magnolias by Robert Harling

=== 1994–1995 ===
- Oleanna by David Mamet
- The Sisters Rosensweig by Wendy Wasserstein
- The Tragedy of Hamlet, Prince of Denmark by William Shakespeare
- Six Degrees of Separation by John Guare
- If We Are Women by Joanna McClelland Glass
- Homeward Bound by Elliott Hayes
- Fronteras Americanas (American Borders) by Guillermo Verdecchia
- Tinka's New Dress by Ronnie Burkett
- Poor Super Man by Brad Fraser
- The Monument by Colleen Wagner
- The Wingfield Farm Trilogy by Dan Needles

=== 1995–1996 ===
- Keely & Du by Jane Martin
- Season's Greetings by Alan Ayckbourn
- Dr. Jekyll & Mr. Hyde - A Love Story by James W. Nichol, inspired by the novel by Robert Louis Stevenson
- Atlantis by Maureen Hunter
- Cyrano de Bergerac by Edmond Rostand, translation and adaptation by Anthony Burgess
- Little Shop of Horrors – The Musical by ward Ashman and Alan Menken
- Our Country's Good by Timberlake Wertenbaker, based upon the novel the Playmaker by Thomas Keneally
- Angels in America, A Gay Fantasia on National Themes, Part One: Millennium Approaches by Tony Kushner
- Les Belles-sœurs by Michel Tremblay
- Lady Day at Emerson's Bar and Grill by Lanie Robertson, musical arrangements by Danny Holgate
- Transit of Venus by Maureen Hunter

=== 1996–1997 ===
- Picasso at the Lapin Agile by Steve Martin
- Arcadia by Tom Stoppard
- Death of a Salesman by Arthur Miller
- There Goes the Bride by Ray Cooney and John Chapman
- The Glace Bay Miners' Museum by Wendy Lill, based on the novel by Sheldon Currie
- Travels With My Aunt by Graham Greene, adapted by Giles Havergal
- An Inspector Calls by J.B. Priestley
- True West by Sam Shepard
- Misery by Simon Moore, adapted from the novel by Stephen King
- None Is Too Many by Jason Sherman, based on the book by Irving Abella and Harold Troper

=== 1997–1998 ===
- A Perfect Garnesh by Terrence McNally
- Master Class by Terrence McNally
- Office Hours by Norm Foster
- The Crucible by Arthur Miller
- Three Tall Women by Edward Albee
- Sylvia by A.R. Gurney
- Quills by Doug Wright
- High Life by Lee MacDougall
- Skylight by David Hare
- Street of Blood by Ronnie Burkett

=== 1998–1999 ===
- Cabaret book by Joe Masteroff, lyrics by Fred Ebb, music by John Kander
- Of Mice and Men by John Steinbeck
- Proposals by Neil Simon
- Blessings in Disguise by Douglas Beattie
- Billy Bishop Goes to War by John MacLachlan Gray and Eric Peterson
- Lady Be Good music and lyrics by George Gershwin and Ira Gershwin, book by Guy Bolton and Fred Thompson
- Wit by Margaret Edson
- Cherry Docs by David Gow
- How I Learned to Drive by Paula Vogel
- The Attic, The Pearls & Three Fine Girls by Jennifer Brewin, Leah Cherniak, Ann-Marie MacDonald, Alisa Palmer, & Martha Ross
- Macbeth by William Shakespeare, adapted by Kevin Williamson

=== 1999–2000 ===
- 'Art' by Yasmina Reza
- King Lear by William Shakespeare
- 2 Pianos, 4 Hands by Ted Dykstra and Richard Greenblatt
- A Streetcar Named Desire by Tennessee Williams
- Wingfield Unbound by Dan Needles
- The Overcoat by Morris Panych and Wendy Gorling
- Patience by Jason Sherman
- Closer by Patrick Marber
- The Beauty Queen of Leenane by Martin McDonagh
- The Last Night of Ballyhoo by Alfred Uhry
- Ethan Claymore's Christmas by Norm Foster

== 21st century (2000–) ==
=== 2000–2001 ===
- To Kill A Mockingbird by Harper Lee and Christopher Sergel
- The Complete Works of William Shakespeare (abridged) by Adam Long, Daniel Singer, and Jess Winfield
- Camelot by Alan Lerner and Frederick Loewe
- The Weir by Conor McPherson
- The Drawer Boy by Michael Healey
- Larry's Party by Carol Shields, Richard Ouzonian and Marek Norman
- The Gist by John Kriznac
- Waiting for Godot by Samuel Beckett
- A Penny for the Guy by Lanie Robertson
- Happy by Ronnie Burkett

=== 2001–2002 ===
- The Wave by Olaf Pyttlik, based on a true story by Ron Jones
- The School for Wives by Molière
- Syncopation by Allan Knee
- Vinci by Maureen Hunter
- Stones in His Pockets by Marie Jones
- The Rainmaker by N. Richard Nash
- The Lost Boys by R. H. Thomson
- The Threepenny Opera by Bertolt Brecht and Kurt Weill
- The Blue Room by David Hare
- The Lonesome West by Martin McDonagh
- Wingfield unbound by Dan Needles

=== 2002–2003 ===
- Proof by David Auburn
- Dracula by Hamilton Deane
- Evita lyrics by Tim Rice, music by Andrew Lloyd Webber
- The Philadelphia Story by Philip Barry
- Over the River and Through the Woods by Joe Dipietro
- Richard III by William Shakespeare
- The Shape of Things by Neil LaBute
- The Homecoming by Harold Pinter
- Time After Time: The Chet Baker Project by James O'Reilly
- Bigger Than Jesus by Rick Miller and Daniel Brooks

=== 2003–2004 ===
- Cookin' at the Cookery: The Music & Times of Alberta Hunter
- The Diary of Anne Frank by Frances Goodrich and Albert Hackett
- My Fair Lady book and lyrics by Alan Jay Lerner, music by Frederick Loewe
- Tuesdays with Morrie by Jeffrey Hatcher and Mitch Albom
- The Winslow Boy by Terence Rattigan
- Crimes of the Heart by Beth Henley
- Feelgood by Alistair Beaton
- Who's Afraid of Virginia Woolf? by Edward Albee
- I, Claudia by Kirsten Thomson
- Mating Dance of the Werewolf by Mark Stein

=== 2004–2005 ===
- Humble Boy by Charlotte Jones
- Night of the Iguana by Tennessee Williams
- Much Ado About Nothing by William Shakespeare
- Trying by Joanna Glass
- The Dresser by Ronald Harwood
- Mamma Mia! music and lyrics by Benny Andersson and Björn Ulvaeus, some songs with Stig Anderson, book by Catherine Johnson
- Real Live Girl by Damien Atkins
- Hosanna by Michel Tremblay
- Provenance by Ronnie Burkett
- The Last Five Years by Jason Robert Brown

=== 2005–2006 ===
- Crowns by Regina Taylor, adapted from the book by Michael Cunningham & Craig Marberry
- A Christmas Carol adapted by Bruce McManus, from the novel by Charles Dickens
- Guys and Dolls music and lyrics by Frank Loesser, book by Jo Swerling and Abe Burrows
- The Innocent Eye Test by Michael Healey
- The Clean House by Sarah Ruhl
- Driving Miss Daisy by Alfred Uhry
- The Goat, or Who Is Sylvia? by Edward Albee
- Cul-de-sac by Daniel MacIvor
- Long Day's Journey into Night by Eugene O'Neill
- Fully Committed by Becky Mode

=== 2006–2007 ===
- The Tempest by William Shakespeare
- Orpheus Descending by Tennessee Williams
- The Rocky Horror Show by Richard O'Brien
- Half Life by John Mighton
- The Constant Wife by Somerset Maugham
- Over the Tavern by Tom Dudzick
- The Retreat from Moscow by William Nicholson
- Summer of My Amazing Luck by Chris Craddock
- The Real Thing by Tom Stoppard
- What Lies Before Us by Morris Panych

=== 2007–2008 ===
- Our Town by Thornton Wilder
- The Importance of Being Earnest by Oscar Wilde
- Fiddler on the Roof by Jerry Bock, Sheldon Harnick, and Joseph Stein
- Shakespeare's Dog by Rick Chafe
- The Syringa Tree by Pamela Gien
- Dreamgirls by Tom Eyen and Henry Krieger
- Hardsell by Rick Miller and Daniel Brooks
- Glengarry Glen Ross by David Mamet
- Rope's End by Douglas Bowie
- The Satchmo' Suite by Hans Böggild and Doug Innis

=== 2008–2009 ===
- Pride and Prejudice by Jane Austen
- Medea by Euripides and Robinson Jeffers
- Jitters by David French
- The Blonde, the Brunette and the Vengeful Redhead by Robert Hewett
- Doubt, A Parable by John Patrick Shanley
- The Boys in the Photograph by Ben Elton
- Scorched by Wajdi Mouawad and Linda Gaboriau
- The Price by Arthur Miller
- Bad Dates by Theresa Rebeck
- Bleeding Hearts by Kevin Klassen

=== 2009–2010 ===
- Strong Poison by Frances Limoncelli
- It's a Wonderful Life: A Radio Play by Philip Grecian
- The Drowsy Chaperone by Lisa Lambert, Greg Morrison, Bob Martin & Don McKellar
- Mother Courage and Her Children by Bertolt Brecht, Peter Hinton-Davis, Paul Dessau, Kurt Weill, and Allen Cole
- Educating Rita by Willy Russell
- Steel Magnolias by Robert Harling
- 5 O'Clock Bells by Pierre Brault
- East of Berlin by Hannah Moscovitch
- Top Girls by Caryl Churchill
- Looking Back - West by Robert Lewis Vaughan

=== 2010–2011 ===
Becomes the Royal Manitoba Theatre Centre in 2010.

- One Flew Over the Cuckoo's Nest by Dale Wasserman
- Irving Berlin's White Christmas The Musical by Paul Blake, Irving Berlin, and David Ives
- Noël Coward's Brief Encounter by Emma Rice
- The Shunning by Patrick Friesen
- Calendar Girls by Tim Firth
- The 39 Steps by Patrick Barlow
- Jake's Gift by Julia Mackey
- The Seafarer by Conor McPherson
- After Miss Julie by Patrick Marber
- The Drowning Girls by Beth Graham, Daniela Vlaskalic, & Charlie Tomlinson

=== 2011–2012 ===
- Grumpy Old Men, The Musical by Dan Remmes, Neil Berg, and Nick Meglin
- Romeo and Juliet by William Shakespeare
- Shirley Valentine by Willy Russell
- The Fighting Days by Wendy Lill
- God of Carnage by Yasmina Reza
- Next to Normal by Brian Yorkey and Tom Kitt
- In the Next Room (or The Vibrator Play) by Sarah Ruhl
- Mrs. Warren's Profession by George Bernard Shaw
- August: Osage County by Tracy Letts
- Blind Date by Rebecca Northan

=== 2012–2013 ===
- A Few Good Men by Aaron Sorkin
- Miracle on South Division Street by Tom Dudzick
- Gone With the Wind by Niki Landau
- Ed's Garage by Dan Needles
- Daddy Long Legs by Paul Gordon and John Caird
- Other People's Money by Jerry Sterner
- Red by John Logan
- Assassins by Stephen Sondheim and John Weidman
- The Penelopiad by Margaret Atwood
- Ride the Cyclone: A Musical by Jacob Richmond and Brooke Maxwell

=== 2013–2014 ===
- Harvey- by Mary Chase
- A Christmas Story- by Philip Grecian, based on the film by Bob Clark
- Jane Eyre- by Charlotte Brontë, adapted by Julie Beckman
- The Glass Menagerie- by Tennessee Williams
- Kim's Convenience- by Ins Choi, co-produced with Soulpepper
- Good People- by David Lindsay-Abaire
- Venus in Fur- by David Ives
- Hirsch- by Alon Nashman and Paul Thompson, co-produced with Theaturtle, Richard Jordan Productions and Elizabeth Bradley Arts Enterprises (in association with The Pleasance)
- The Seagull- by Anton Chekhov, translated by David French
- The Secret Annex- by Alix Sobler
- Miracle on South Division Street- by Tom Dudzick

=== 2014–2015 ===
- Sherlock Holmes and the Case of the Jersey Lily – by Katie Forgette, loosely adapted from the play by William Gillette and Arthur Conan Doyle, and from the writings of Oscar Wilde and William Shakespeare
- The Heart of Robin Hood – book by David Farr, music by Parsonsfield, lyrics by Parsonsfield and David Farr, co-produced with David Mirvish and Barry & Fran Weissler
- Cabaret – book by Joe Masteroff, based on the play by John Van Druten and stories by Christopher Isherwood, music by John Kander, lyrics by Fred Ebb
- Vanya and Sonia and Masha and Spike – by Christopher Durang, co-produced with Mirvish Productions
- The Woman in Black – adapted by Stephen Mallatratt, from the novel by Susan Hill
- Clever Little Lies – by Joe DiPietro
- Armstrong's War – by Colleen Murphy
- The Devil's Music: The Life and Blues of Bessie Smith – by Angelo Parra
- Private Lives – by Noël Coward
- Late Company – by Jordan Tannahill

=== 2015–2016 ===
- The Man Who Shot Liberty Valance – by Jethro Compton, based on the short story by Dorothy M. Johnson
- Alice Through the Looking-Glass – by Lewis Carroll, adapted by James Reaney
- Billy Elliot The Musical – book by Lee Hall, music and lyrics by Elton John
- Chimerica – by Lucy Kirkwood, co-produced with Canadian Stage
- Unnecessary Farce – by Paul Slade Smith
- BOOM – by Rick Miller, co-produced with Kidoons and WYRD Productions
- Seminar – by Theresa Rebeck, co-produced with Mirvish Productions
- Wiesenthal – by Tom Dugan, co-produced with Daryl Roth, Karyl Lynn Burns, Catherine Adler, Suzy & Burton Farbman and Anne & Michael Tobes
- Things We Do for Love – by Alan Ayckbourn
- Myth of the Ostrich – by Matt Murray
- The Hound of the Baskervilles – by Arthur Conan Doyle, adapted by Steven Canny & John Nicholson, originally produced by Prairie Theatre Exchange

=== 2016–2017 ===
- The Curious Incident of the Dog in the Night-Time – by Simon Stephens, based on the novel by Mark Haddon, co-produced with Citadel Theatre
- The Audience – by Peter Morgan, co-produced with Mirvish Productions
- Million Dollar Quartet – by Colin Escott & Floyd Mutrux
- Black Coffee – by Agatha Christie
- Bittergirl: the Musical – by Annabel Fitzsimmons, Alison Lawrence & Mary Francis Moore
- Sarah Ballenden – by Maureen Hunter
- My Name Is Asher Lev – by Aaron Posner, adapted from the novel by Chaim Potok, co-produced with Segal Centre
- 23.5 Hours – by Carey Crim
- Hand to God – by Robert Askins
- Kill Me Now – by Brad Fraser, co-produced with Canada's National Arts Centre
- Last Train to Nibroc – by Arlene Hutton

=== 2017–2018 ===
- Shakespeare in Love – by Lee Hall, adapted from the screenplay by Tom Stoppard and Marc Norman, co-produced with Citadel Theatre
- A Christmas Carol – by Charles Dickens, adapted by Bruce McManus
- Come from Away – by Irene Sankoff and David Hein, Canadian regional premiere, by special arrangement with David Mirvish and Junkyard Dog Productions
- Once – book by Enda Walsh, music and lyrics by Glen Hansard and Markéta Irglová, based on the film by John Carney, co-produced with The Grand Theatre
- The Humans – by Stephen Karam
- Morning after Grace – by Carey Crim
- Nine Dragons – by Jovanni Sy, co-produced with Gateway Theatre and Vertigo Theatre
- Outside Mullingar – by John Patrick Shanley
- Di and Viv and Rose – by Amelia Bullmore
- Heisenberg – by Simon Stephens

=== 2018–2019 ===
- Sense and Sensibility – by Jane Austen, adapted by Ellen Peterson
- It's a Wonderful Life: The Radio Play – based on the film by Frank Capra, adapted by Philip Grecian
- Matilda the Musical – by Roald Dahl, adapted by Dennis Kelly, music and lyrics by Tim Minchin, co-produced with Arts Club Theatre Company and Citadel Theatre
- A Doll's House, Part 2 – by Lucas Hnath, co-produced with Mirvish Productions
- Boom X – by Rick Miller, co-produced with Kidoons and WYRD Productions, Theatre Calgary and The 20K Collective
- The Cottage – by Jake MacDonald, world premiere
- 887 – by Robert Lepage
- Vietgone – by Qui Nguyen, co-produced with fu-GEN Theatre and Hope and Hell Theatre Co.
- A Doll's House – by Henrik Ibsen, translated by Joan Tindale
- Made In Italy – by Farren Timoteo, co-produced with Western Canada Theatre
- John – by Annie Baker

=== 2019–2020 ===
- The Color Purple - book by Marsha Norman, music and lyrics by Brenda Russell, Allee Willis, and Stephen Bray, based on the novel by Alice Walker, co-produced with Citadel Theatre
- Miss Bennet: Christmas at Pemberley – by Margot Melcon and Lauren Gunderson
- As You Like It – by William Shakespeare, adapted by Daryl Cloran, co-produced with Citadel Theatre
- The New Canadian Curling Club – by Mark Crawford
- A Thousand Splendid Suns – by Ursula Rani Sarma, based on the book by Khaled Hosseini (Cancelled due to COVID-19)
- The Legend of Georgia McBride – by Matthew Lopez (Cancelled due to COVID-19)
- Bang Bang - by Kat Sandler, co-produced with Belfry Theatre
- Fun Home – book and lyrics by Lisa Kron, music by Jeanine Tesori, adapted from the graphic novel by Alison Bechdel
- Every Brilliant Thing – by Duncan Macmillan and Jonny Donahoe, co-produced with Talk Is Free Theatre
- Women of the Fur Trade – by Frances Koncan

=== 2020–2021 ===
- All is Bright
- The Mountaintop – by Katori Hall
- The (Post) Mistress – book, lyrics and music by Tomson Highway
- A Piece of Me – by Jordan Sangalang
- Ode to RED Auntie – by Waawaate Fobister
- The Show – by Liam Zarrillo
- Where.Are.You.From. – by Primrose Madayag Knazan

=== 2021–2022 ===
- Orlando – by Virginia Woolf, adapted by Sarah Ruhl
- The Lifespan of a Fact – by Jeremy Kareken & David Murrell and Gordon Farrell, based on the book by John D'Agata and Jim Fingal (Cancelled due to COVID-19)
- Calpurnia – by Audrey Dwyer, co-produced with the NAC English Theatre and Black Theatre Workshop
- The Rez Sisters – by Tomson Highway
- Sea Sick – by Alanna Mitchell, co-produced with The Theatre Centre
- The Runner – by Christopher Morris, co-produced with Human Cargo

=== 2022–2023 ===
- Network – adapted by Lee Hall, based on the screenplay by Paddy Chayefsky, co-produced with Citadel Theatre
- The Three Musketeers – adapted by Catherine Bush, based on the novel by Alexandre Dumas
- Into the Woods – music and lyrics by Stephen Sondheim, book by James Lapine
- Trouble in Mind – by Alice Childress, co-produced with Citadel Theatre
- The Secret to Good Tea – by Rosanna Deerchild
- Burning Mom – by Mieko Ouchi
- New – by Pamela Mala Sinha, co-produced with Necessary Angel Theatre Company
- Let's Run Away – by Daniel MacIvor
- Sexual Misconduct of the Middle Classes – by Hannah Moscovitch
- Yaga – by Kat Sandler

=== 2023–2024 ===
- Clue – adapted by Sandy Rustin, Hunter Foster and Eric Price, based on the screenplay by Jonathan Lynn, co-produced with the Grand Theatre
- The Sound of Music – music by Richard Rodgers, lyrics by Oscar Hammerstein II, book by Howard Lindsay and Russel Crouse, co-produced with Citadel Theatre
- Beautiful: The Carole King Musical – lyrics and music by Gerry Goffin and Carole King, and Barry Mann and Cynthia Weil, book by Douglas McGrath, co-produced with The Segal Centre
- The Mountaintop – by Katori Hall
- The Lehman Trilogy – by Stefano Massini, adapted by Ben Power
- The Comeback – by Trish Cooper and Sam Vint
- First Métis Man of Odesa – by Matthew MacKenzie and Mariya Khomutova, co-produced with Puncuate! Theatre
- among men – by David Yee, co-produced with Theatre Projects Manitoba
- The Piano Teacher – by Dorothy Dittrich
- Guilt: A Love Story – by Diane Flacks, co-produced with Tarragon Theatre

=== 2024–2025 ===
- The Play That Goes Wrong – by Henry Lewis, Jonathan Sayer and Henry Shields, in partnership with Citadel Theatre and Theatre Calgary
- Little Women – based on the novels Little Women & Good Wives by Louisa May Alcott, adapted for the stage by Jordi Mand
- Waitress – book by Jessie Nelson, music and lyrics by Sara Bareilles, based upon the motion picture by Adrienne Shelley
- Indecent – by Paula Vogel
- Casey and Diana – by Nick Green, a co-production with Theatre Aquarius
- ELEVATE: Manaaji'idiwin – by David MacLeod
- The Recipe – by Armin Wiebe, a co-production with Theatre Projects Manitoba
- Mix Tapes From My Mom – written and performed by Cory Wojcik
- King James – by Rajiv Joseph
- Murder for Two – book & music by Joe Kinosian, book & lyrics by Kellen Blair

=== 2025-2026 ===
- Life of Pi - based on the novel by Yann Martel, adapted by Lolita Chakrabarti, in partnership with Citadel Theatre
- Elf - The Musical - book by Thomas Meehan & Bob Martin, music by Matthew Sklar, lyrics by Chad Beguelin, based upon the New Line Cinema film written by David Berenbaum
- Murder on the Orient Express - by Agatha Christie, adapted for the stage by Ken Ludwig, in partnership with Citadel Theatre
- Rogers v. Rogers - adapted for the stage by Michael Healey, based on Rogers v. Rogers: The Battle for Control of Canada's Telecom Empire by Alexandra Posadzki, a Crow's Theatre production
- The Last Wife - by Kate Hennig
- Rubaboo - A Métis Cabaret - by Andrea Menard, music by Andrea Menard and Robert Walsh, in partnership with Persephone Theatre
- Wonderful Joe - created and performed by Ronnie Burkett
- A Number - by Caryl Churchill
- Holland - by Trish Cooper, in partnership with Theatre Projects Manitoba
- In the Shadow Beyond the Pines - by Rhonda Apetagon
