= Theatre Calgary production history =

Theatre Calgary is theatre company in Calgary, Alberta, Canada, established as a professional company in 1968. The following is a chronological list of the productions that have been staged since its inception as Musicians and Actors Club (MAC) from 1964 to 1968, and Theatre Calgary from 1968 onwards.

== 1964–1965 ==
- Light Up the Sky – by Moss Hart
- A Taste of Honey – by Shelagh Delaney
- Two for the Seesaw by William Gibson
- Oh Dad, Poor Dad, Mama's Hung You in the Closet and I'm Feelin' So Sad – by Arthur Kopit
- The American Dream by Edward Albee
- The Sandbox – by Edward Albee
- In White America – by Martin Duberman
- Luther – by John Osborne

== 1965–1966 ==
- A Thousand Clowns – by Herb Gardner
- The Feiffer Revue
- Cat On a Hot Tin Roof – by Tennessee Williams
- Present Laughter – by Noël Coward
- A View from the Bridge – by Arthur Miller
- The Private Ear and The Public Eye – by Peter Shaffer
- Of Mice and Men – by John Steinbeck
- Mary, Mary – by Jean Kerr
- The Knack – by Ann Jellicoe
- The Hostage – by Brendan Behan

== 1966–1967 ==
- Under the Yum-Yum Tree – by Lawrence Roman
- The Firebugs – by Max Frisch
- The Caretaker – by Harold Pinter
- Major Barbara – by George Bernard Shaw
- Breath of Spring – by Peter Coke
- The Miracle Worker – by William Gibson
- You Can't Take It with You – by George S. Kaufman
- A Streetcar Named Desire – by Tennessee Williams

== 1967–1968 ==
- Wild Rose
- Luv by Murray Schisgal
- The Glass Menagerie – by Tennessee Williams
- Charley's Aunt – by Brandon Thomas
- Dial M For Murder – by Frederick Knott
- The Killing of Sister George – by Robert Aldrich
- Barefoot in the Park – by Neil Simon

== 1968–1969 ==
- The Odd Couple – by Neil Simon
- The Alchemist – by Ben Jonson
- Gaslight – by Patrick Hamilton
- Irma La Douce – music by Marguerite Monnot, lyrics and book by Alexandre Breffort
- Private Lives – by Noël Coward
- The Three Desks
- Black Comedy & The White Liars – by Peter Shaffer

== 1969–1970 ==
- Star Spangled Girl – by Neil Simon
- Loot – by Joe Orton
- Great Expectations – by Charles Dickens
- You Two Stay Here, The Rest of You Come with Me – by Christopher Newton, music by Allen Laing
- The Importance of Being Earnest – by Oscar Wilde
- Long Day's Journey Into Night – by Eugene O'Neill
- Bell, Book and Candle – by John Van Druten

== 1970–1971 ==
- The Entertainer – by John Osborne
- The Birthday Party – by Harold Pinter
- Dracula – by Hamilton Deane
- Trip
- The Taming of the Shrew – by William Shakespeare
- The Father – by August Strindberg
- The Knack – by Ann Jellicoe

== 1971–1972 ==
- Plaza Suite – by Neil Simon
- The Rainmaker – by N. Richard Nash
- The Guardsman – by Ferenc Molnár
- The Hostage – by Brendan Behan
- Romeo and Juliet – by William Shakespeare
- The House on Chestnut Street – by James W. Nichol
- Arms and the Man – by George Bernard Shaw

== 1972–1973 ==
- Butterflies Are Free – by Leonard Gershe
- The Effect of Gamma Rays on Man-in-the-Moon Marigolds – by Paul Zindel
- Jacques Brel is Alive and Well and Living in Paris – by Jacques Brel
- Wait Until Dark – by Frederick Knott
- The Devil's Disciple – by George Bernard Shaw
- Leaving Home – by David French
- Bus Stop – by William Inge

== 1973–1974 ==
- How the Other Half Loves – by Alan Ayckbourn
- Walsh – by Sharon Pollock
- Oh! What A Lovely War – by Joan Littlewood
- Jacques Brel is Alive and Well and Living in Paris – by Jacques Brel
- The Fantasticks – music by Harvey Schmidt, lyrics by Tom Jones
- Play It Again, Sam – by Woody Allen
- The Seagull – by Anton Chekhov
- Prisoner of Second Avenue – by Neil Simon

== 1974–1975 ==
- 6 RMS Riv VU – by Bob Randall
- The Rivals – by Richard Brinsley Sheridan
- The Threepenny Opera – by Bertolt Brecht
- A Flea in Her Ear – by Georges Feydeau
- Who Killed Santa Claus? – by Christian Jaque
- Sudden Death Overtime
- Relatively Speaking – by Alan Ayckbourn

== 1975–1976 ==
- Tonight at Calgary Theatre Hall
- My Fat Friend – by Charles Laurence
- Back to Beulah – by W. O. Mitchell
- Rosencrantz and Guildenstern Are Dead – by Tom Stoppard
- Chemin de Fer – by Georges Feydeau
- Absurd Person Singular – by Alan Ayckbourn

== 1976–1977 ==
- The Sunshine Boys – by Neil Simon
- The Glass Menagerie – by Tennessee Williams
- Time and Time Again – by Alan Acykbourn
- Hedda Gabler – by Henrik Ibsen
- Festival – book and lyrics by Stephen Downs and Randall Martin, music by Stephen Downs
- Equus – by Peter Shaffer
- A Thousand Clowns – by Herb Gardner

== 1977–1978 ==
- That Championship Season – by Jason Miller
- Sleuth – by Anthony Shaffer
- The Condemned of Altona – by Jean-Paul Sartre
- The Playboy of the Western World – by J.M. Synge
- Streamers – by David Rabe
- The Importance of Being Earnest – by Oscar Wilde
- Hosanna – by Michel Tremblay
- Boiler Room Suite – by Rex Deverell
- Travesties – by Tom Stoppard

== 1978–1979 ==
- Same Time, Next Year – by Bernard Slade
- The Mary Shelley Play
- Mandragola – by Niccolò Machiavelli
- One Night Stand – by Carol Bolt
- Under Milk Wood – by Dylan Thomas
- The Black Bonspiel of Wullie MacCrimmon – by W. O. Mitchell
- Midtown Acres
- Antigone – by Jean Anouilh
- Paper Wheat – by 25th Street House Theatre
- The Miners Forty Niners

== 1979–1980 ==
- Eight to the Bar
- Of Mice and Men – by John Steinbeck
- Thark – by Ben Travers
- The Words of My Roaring – by Robert Kroetsch
- Mirandolina – by Bohuslav Martinů
- Birds – by Aristophanes
- Black Bonspiel of Wullie MacCrimmon – by W.O. Mitchell
- Sexual Perversity in Chicago – by David Mamet
- White Whore and the Bit Player – by Tom Eyen
- Rainbow
- Rock and more
- Blitzkrieg
- Perfect Relationships
- Out at Sea – by Nicholas Bethell, Slawomir Mrozek
- The Man With the Flower in His Mouth – by Luigi Pirandello
- Spider Rabbit – by Michael McClure

== 1980–1981 ==
- Jitters – by David French
- Betrayal – by Harold Pinter
- Automatic Pilot – by Erika Ritter
- The Tempest – by William Shakespeare
- Happy End – lyrics by Bertolt Brecht, music by Kurt Weill
- The Kite – by W.O. Mitchell
- Maggie and Pierre – by Linda Griffiths
- Solange / The Beard
- Joggers – by Geraldine Aron
- Unseen
- Years of Sorrow, Years of Shame
- Yanks 3 / Detroit 0, Top of the Seventh – by Johnathan Reynolds

== 1981–1982 ==
- Mrs. Warren's Profession – by George Bernard Shaw
- Blood Relations – by Sharon Pollock
- The Sea Horse – by Edward J. Moore
- For Those in Peril at Sea – W.O. Mitchell
- Farther West – by John Murrell
- On Golden Pond – by Ernest Thompson
- The Elephant Man – by Bernard Pomerance
- Cold Comfort – by Jim Garrard
- President Wilson in Paris – by Ron Blair
- The Immigrant – by Mark Harelik, Sarah Knapp, Steven M. Alper
- Bullshot Crummond – by Ronald E. House, Diz White, Alan Shearman

== 1982–1983 ==
- Mass Appeal – by Bill C. Davis
- A Moon for the Misbegotten – by Eugene O'Neill
- Rexy! – by Allan Stratton
- Whiskey Six Rebellion – by Sharon Pollock
- Let's Get a Divorce – based on Divorcons by Victorien Sardou and Émile de Najac
- Talley's Folly – by Lanford Wilson
- Emlyn Williams as Charles Dickens – by Emlyn Williams

== 1983–1984 ==
- What the Butler Saw – by Joe Orton
- A Christmas Carol – by Charles Dickens
- Old Times – by Harold Pinter
- I'm Getting My Act Together and Taking It on the Road
- Doc – by Sharon Pollock
- The Dining Room – by A.R. Gurney Jr.

== 1984–1985 ==
- A Streetcar Named Desire – by Tennessee Williams
- A Christmas Carol – by Charles Dickens
- Cold Storage – by Ronald Ribman
- Whodunnit – Anthony Shaffer
- Quartermaine's Terms – by Simon Gray
- Filthy Rich – by George F. Walker
- Cloud 9 – by Caryl Churchill
- Forever Yours, Marie-Lou – by Michel Tremblay

== 1985–1986 ==
- Twelfth Night – by William Shakespeare
- K2 – by Patrick Meyers
- Alice on Stage
- Uncle Vanya – by Anton Chekhov
- Criminals in Love – by George F. Walker
- Country Hearts – by Ted Johns and John Roby
- Intimate Admiration – by Rick Epp

== 1986–1987 ==
- Brighton Beach Memoirs – by Neil Simon
- The Play's the Thing – by Ferenc Molnár
- Salt-Water Moon – by David French
- And When I Wake - by James W. Nichol
- Golden Girls by Louise Page
- The Normal Heart – by Larry Kramer
- Souvenirs
- True West – by Sam Shepard

== 1987–1988 ==
- Pal Joey – music by Richard Rodgers, lyrics by Lorenz Hart, book by John O’Hara
- Summer – by Jane Martin
- Walsh – by Sharon Pollock
- You Never Can Tell – by George Bernard Shaw
- Making Brownies Like We Used To – by John Palmer
- The Real Thing – by Tom Stoppard
- Beauty and the Beast – by Warren Graves

== 1988–1989 ==
- Broadway Bound – by Neil Simon
- Terra Nova – by Ted Talley
- The Black Bonspiel of Wullie MacCrimmon – by W. O. Mitchell
- The Glass Menagerie – by Tennessee Williams
- The Innocents – by William Archibald
- Fire – by Paul Ledoux and David Young

== 1989–1990 ==
- Blithe Spirit – by Noël Coward
- Toronto, Mississippi – by Joan MacLeod
- A Christmas Carol – by Charles Dickens
- Driving Miss Daisy – by Alfred Uhry
- Bordertown Cafe – by Kelly Rebar
- Summer and Smoke – by Tennessee Williams

== 1990–1991 ==
- Tartuffe – by Molière
- Amigo's Blue Guitar – by Joan MacLeod
- A Christmas Carol – by Charles Dickens
- Letters from Wingfield Farm – by Dan Needles
- My Children, My Africa – by Athol Fugard
- The Woman in Black – by Susan Hill
- Amadeus – by Peter Shaffer

== 1991–1992 ==
- A Midsummer Night's Dream – by William Shakespeare
- The Sum of Us – by David Stevens
- Wingfield's Progress – by Dan Needles
- A Christmas Carol – by Charles Dickens
- Les Liaisons Dangereuses – by Christopher Hampton
- The Motor Trade
- Fences – by August Wilson
- Gypsy – music by Jule Styne, lyrics by Stephen Sondheim, book by Arthur Laurents

== 1992–1993 ==
- Much Ado About Nothing – by William Shakespeare
- The Kite – by W.O. Mitchell
- A Christmas Carol – by Charles Dickens
- La Bête – by David Hirson
- Arsenic and Old Lace – by Joseph Kesselring
- Wingfield's Folly – by Dan Needles
- Evita – music by Andrew Lloyd Webber, lyrics by Tim Rice

== 1993–1994 ==
- Dancing at Lughnasa – by Brian Friel
- Tru – by Jay Presson Allen
- A Christmas Carol – by Charles Dickens
- Henceforward... – by Alan Ayckbourn
- Hamlet – by William Shakespeare
- Wrong for Each Other – by Norm Foster
- Anne of Green Gables – by Lucy Maud Montgomery

== 1994–1995 ==
- Forever Plaid – by Stuart Ross
- Charley's Aunt – by Brandon Thomas
- A Christmas Carol – by Charles Dickens
- Transit of Venus – by Maureen Hunter
- Waiting for Godot – by Samuel Beckett
- If We Are Women – by Joanna McClelland Glass
- Into the Woods – music and lyrics by Stephen Sondheim, book by James Lapine, based on The Uses of Enchantment by Bruno Bettelheim
- Forever Plaid – by Stuart Ross

== 1995–1996 ==
- Waiting for the Parade – by John Murrell
- The Importance of Being Earnest – by Oscar Wilde
- A Christmas Carol – by Charles Dickens
- Cyrano de Bergerac – by Edmond Rostand
- Atlantis – by Maureen Hunter
- Dr. Jekyll and Mr. Hyde: A Love Story – by James W. Nichol
- Little Shop of Horrors – by Howard Ashman and Alan Menken

== 1996–1997 ==
- Tons of Money – by Alan Ayckbourn
- A Christmas Carol – by Charles Dickens
- Stephen and Mister Wilde – by Jim Bartley
- Piaf – by Pam Gems
- The Heiress – by Ruth Goetz and Augustus Goetz

== 1997–1998 ==
- The Cocktail Hour – by A. R. Gurney
- An Inspector Calls – by J.B. Priestley
- A Christmas Carol – by Charles Dickens
- A Delicate Balance – by Edward Albee
- Memoir
- Song and Dance – music by Andrew Lloyd Webber, lyrics by Don Black, additional lyrics by Richard Maltby, Jr.

== 1998–1999 ==
- Private Lives – by Noël Coward
- All My Sons – by Arthur Miller
- A Christmas Carol – by Charles Dickens
- The Fox – by Allan Miller
- Candida – by George Bernard Shaw
- The Fantasticks – music by Harvey Schmidt, lyrics by Tom Jones

== 1999–2000 ==
- Wingfield Unbound – by Dan Needles
- The Glass Menagerie – by Tennessee Williams
- A Christmas Carol – by Charles Dickens
- Gaslight by Patrick Hamilton
- A Fitting Confusion – by Georges Feydeau
- Holiday – by Philip Barry
- Berlin to Broadway with Kurt Weill music by Kurt Weill, Lyrics by Alan Jay Lerner, Bertolt Brecht, Ira Gershwin, Michael Feingold, Ogden Nash, Maxwell Anderson, Marc Blitzstein, Jacques Deval, Paul Green, Langston Hughes, George Tabori, Arnold Weinstein

== 2000–2001 ==
- Rough Crossing
- Cat on a Hot Tin Roof – by Tennessee Williams
- A Christmas Carol – by Charles Dickens
- Camelot – by Alan Lerner and Frederick Loewe
- Dangerous Corner – by J.B. Priestley
- The Sisters Rosensweig – by Wendy Wasserstein

== 2001–2002 ==
- Cabaret – book by Joe Masteroff, lyrics by Fred Ebb, music by John Kander
- Romeo and Juliet – by William Shakespeare
- A Christmas Carol – by Charles Dickens
- True West – by Sam Shepard
- Death of a Salesman – by Arthur Miller
- Wingfield on Ice – by Dan Needles

== 2002–2003 ==
- A Streetcar Named Desire – by Tennessee Williams
- Dracula – by Hamilton Deane
- A Christmas Carol – by Charles Dickens
- Evita – music by Andrew Lloyd Webber, lyrics by Tim Rice
- The Philadelphia Story – by Phillip Barry
- Copenhagen – by Michael Frayn

== 2003–2004 ==
- Hay Fever – by Noël Coward
- The Diary of Anne Frank – by Frances Goodrich and Albert Hackett
- A Christmas Carol – by Charles Dickens
- Fire – by Paul Ledoux and David Young
- Crimes of the Heart – by Beth Henley
- Counsellor-At-Law – by Elmer Rice

== 2004–2005 ==
- Of the Fields, Lately – by David French
- Sherlock Holmes – by Arthur Conan Doyle
- A Christmas Carol – by Charles Dickens
- Macbeth – by William Shakespeare
- West Side Story – book by Arthur Laurents, music by Leonard Bernstein, lyrics by Stephen Sondheim
- Humble Boy – by Charlotte Jones

== 2005–2006 ==
- The Miracle Worker – by William Gibson
- Wingfield's Inferno – by Dan Needles
- A Christmas Carol – by Charles Dickens
- Saint Joan – by George Bernard Shaw
- Trying – by Joanna Glass
- Guys and Dolls – music and lyrics by Frank Loesser, book by Jo Swerling and Abe Burrows

== 2006–2007 ==
- Of Mice and Men – by John Steinbeck
- Glorious! – by Peter Quilter
- A Christmas Carol – by Charles Dickens
- The Retreat from Moscow – by William Nicholson
- The Cripple of Inishmaan – by Martin McDonagh
- The Overcoat – by Morris Panych and Wendy Gorling

== 2007–2008 ==
- The Wars – by Timothy Findley
- Vigil – by Morris Panych
- A Christmas Carol – by Charles Dickens
- Our Town – by Thornton Wilder
- Enchanted April – by Matthew Barber
- Beauty and the Beast – music by Alan Menken, lyrics by Howard Ashman and Tim Rice, book by Linda Woolverton

== 2008–2009 ==
- A Raisin in the Sun – by Lorraine Hansberry
- Skydive – by Kevin Kerr
- A Christmas Carol – by Charles Dickens, adapted by Jerry Patch
- Frankenstein – written, composed and directed by Jonathan Christenson, adapted from the novel by Mary Shelley
- Doubt: A Parable – by John Patrick Shanley
- An Ideal Husband – by Oscar Wilde
- Dirty Rotten Scoundrels – book by Jeffrey Lane, music & lyrics by David Yazbek

== 2009–2010 ==
- Jake and the Kid – adapted by Conni Massing, based on the short stories by W.O. Mitchell
- 7 Stories – by Morris Panych
- A Christmas Carol – by Charles Dickens
- Electric Company Theatre and The Virtual Stage's production of No Exit
- Beyond Eden – by Bruce Ruddell, music by Bruce Ruddell and Bill Henderson
- Betrayal – by Harold Pinter
- The 25th Annual Putnam County Spelling Bee – music and lyrics by William Finn, book by Rachel Sheinkin

== 2010–2011 ==
- One Flew Over the Cuckoo's Nest – by Dale Wasserman
- Lost - A Memoir – by Cathy Ostlere and Dennis Garnhum
- A Christmas Carol – by Charles Dickens, adapted by Jeremy Patch
- Billy Bishop Goes to War – by John MacLachlan Gray and Eric Peterson
- The Drowsy Chaperone – by Lisa Lambert and Greg Morrison
- Much Ado About Nothing – by William Shakespeare
- Mom's the Word For Crying Out Loud – by Jill Daum, Linda A. Carson, Alison Kelly, Barbara Pollard, Robin Nichols and Deborah Williams

== 2011–2012 ==
- Tosca Cafe – by Carey Perloff and Val Caniparoli
- To Kill a Mockingbird – adapted by Christopher Sergel, based on the novel by Harper Lee
- A Christmas Carol – by Charles Dickens, adapted by Dennis Garnhum
- Ubuntu: The Cape Town Project– by Theatrefront
- Enron – by Lucy Prebble
- Shirley Valentine – by Willy Russell
- Cats (musical) – by Andrew Lloyd Webber

== 2012–2013 ==
- Next to Normal – by Brian Yorkey and Tom Kitt
- Pride and Prejudice – by Jane Austen
- A Christmas Carol – by Charles Dickens, adapted by Dennis Garnhum
- The Kite Runner – by Khaled Hosseini, adapted by Matthew Spangler
- God of Carnage – by Yasmina Reza, translated by Christoper Hampton
- Anne of Green Gables – The Musical – by Lucy Maud Montgomery, Music and Lyrics by Donald Harron, Norman Campbell, Elaine Campbell and Mavor Moore

== 2013-2014 ==
- Romeo and Juliet – by William Shakespeare
- Kim's Convenience – by Ins Choi
- The Great Gatsby – adapted by Simon Levy, based on the novel by F. Scott Fitzgerald
- A Christmas Carol – by Charles Dickens adapted by Dennis Garnhum
- Boom – written and performed by Rick Miller
- Major Barbara – by George Bernard Shaw
- The Mountaintop – by Katori Hall
- Disney's and Cameron Mackintosh's Mary Poppins – music and lyrics by Robert B. Sherman, Richard M. Sherman and George Stiles, book by Julian Fellowes, based on the book series by P.L. Travers

== 2014-2015 ==
- The Comedy of Errors – by William Shakespeare
- One Man, Two Guvnors – by Richard Bean
- Liberation Days – by David van Belle
- A Christmas Carol – by Charles Dickens adapted by Dennis Garnhum
- Chelsea Hotel – conceived by Tracey Power
- The Philadelphia Story – by Philip Barry
- King Lear – by William Shakespeare
- Dear Johnny Deere – by Ken Cameron

== 2015-2016 ==
- The Tempest – by William Shakespeare
- The Shoplifters – by Morris Panych, Canadian premiere
- The Crucible – by Arthur Miller
- A Christmas Carol – by Charles Dickens, adapted by Dennis Garnhum
- Spin – written and performed by evalyn parry
- The Little Prince - The Musical – based on the book by Antoine de Saint-Exupéry, adapted by Nicholas Lloyd Webber and James D. Reid, a world premiere production with Lamplighter Drama, London, UK.
- Bad Jews – by Joshua Harmon
- The Light in the Piazza – book by Craig Lucas, music and lyrics by Adam Guettel, based on the novel by Elizabeth Spencer, produced by arrangement with Turner Entertainment Co., owner of the original motion picture Light in the Piazza. The Light in the Piazza was presented through special arrangement with R&H Theatricals

== 2016-2017 ==
- Hamlet – by William Shakespeare
- 'Da Kink in My Hair – by Trey Anthony
- Boom – written and performed by Rick Miller
- A Christmas Carol – by Charles Dickens, adapted by Dennis Garnhum
- Songs of Resilience – by the Queer Songbook Orchestra and Special Guests
- The Audience – by Peter Morgan
- Skylight – by David Hare
- A Thousand Splendid Suns – based on the novel by Khaled Hosseini, adapted by Ursula Rani Sarma, original music written and performed by David Coulter, a world premiere production with American Conservatory Theater (A.C.T.), San Francisco
- Crazy for You - The New Gershwin Musical – music and lyrics by George Gershwin and Ira Gershwin, book by Ken Ludwig, A co-production with The Citadel Theatre, Edmonton

== 2017-2018 ==
- Blow Wind High Water - by Sharon Pollock
- Sisters: The Belles Soeurs Musical - based on the play by Michel Tremblay, book and lyrics by René Richard Cyr, music by Daniel Belanger
- Twelfth Night - by William Shakespeare
- The Humans - by Stephen Karam
- The Secret Garden - book and lyrics by Marsha Norman, music by Lucy Simon
- As You Like It - by William Shakespeare
- A Christmas Carol - by Charles Dickens, adapted by Dennis Garnhum
- Onegin - by Amiel Gladstone and Veda Hille

== 2022–2023 season ==
- Lady Day at Emerson's Bar and Grill - by Lanie Robertson
- The Importance of Being Earnest - by Oscar Wilde
- Little Women - by Kate Hamill, adapted from the novel by Louisa May Alcott
- Little Red Warrior and His Lawyer - by Kevin Loring
- Forgiveness - by Mark Sakamoto, stage adaptation by Hiro Kanagawa
- Jimmy Buffett's Escape to Margaritaville - Music & Lyrics by Jimmy Buffett, Book by Greg Garcia & Mike O'Malley
