= Theatre New Brunswick production history =

Theatre New Brunswick is the only professional theatre company in New Brunswick, Canada. It began operation in 1968, and has been successfully operating since that time. TNB celebrated its 50th anniversary in 2018.

The following is a chronological list of the productions that have been staged since its inception.

== 1968 ==
- Little Hut – by André Roussin
- Any Wednesday – by Muriel Resnik
- Springtime for Henry – by Benn W. Levy
- Barefoot in the Park – by Neil Simon

== 1969 ==
- The Marriage-Go-Round – by Leslie Stevens
- Inadmissible Evidence – by John Osborne
- Boeing Boeing – by Marc Camoletti
- The Glass Menagerie – by Tennessee Williams
- The Importance of Being Earnest – by Oscar Wilde
- Gaslight – by Patrick Hamilton
- Star Spangled Girl – by Neil Simon
- See How They Run – by Philip King
- Dick Whittington – by Nicholas Pegg

== 1970 ==
- Two for the Seesaw – by William Gibson
- There's a Girl in My Soup – by Terence Frisby
- Who's Afraid of Virginia Woolf? – by Edward Albee
- Black Comedy – by Peter Shaffer
- A Resounding Tinkle – by N. F. Simpson
- Private Lives – by Noël Coward
- Mary, Mary – by Jean Kerr
- Dial M for Murder – by Frederick Knott
- Critic's Choice – by Ira Levin
- Please Don't Sneeze

== 1971 ==
- A Man for All Seasons – by Robert Bolt
- The Mousetrap – by Agatha Christie
- The Playboy of the Western World – by J. M. Synge
- Plaza Suite – by Neil Simon

== 1972 ==
- Butterflies Are Free – by Leonard Gershe
- The Country Girl – by Clifford Odets
- Philadelphia, Here I Come! – by Brian Friel
- The King and I – by Richard Rodgers and Oscar Hammerstein II
- The Lion in Winter – by James Goldman
- Present Laughter – by Noël Coward
- The Secretary Bird – by William Douglas-Home

== 1973 ==
- How the Other Half Loves – by Alan Ayckbourn
- Leaving Home – by David French
- The Caretaker – by Harold Pinter
- Dracula – by Hamilton Deane
- The Patrick Pearse Motel – by Hugh Leonard
- Jacques Brel Is Alive and Well and Living in Paris – by Jacques Brel
- Othello – by William Shakespeare

== 1974 ==
- Death of a Salesman – by Arthur Miller
- Who Killed Santa Claus? – by Terence Feely
- Born Yesterday – by Garson Kanin
- The Fantasticks – music by Harvey Schmidt, lyrics by Tom Jones
- Frankenstein – The Man Who Would Be God
- The Fourposter – by Jan de Hartog
- Head, Guts and Soundbone Dance – by Michael Cook

== 1975 ==
- The School for Scandal – by Richard Brinsley Sheridan
- Godspell – by Stephen Schwartz and John-Michael Tebelak
- Sleuth – by Anthony Shaffer
- The Man Most Likely To
- The Innocents – by William Archibald
- A Flea in Her Ear – by Georges Feydeau
- Frankenstein – adapted by Alden Nowlan and Walter Learning
- No Name
- The Island – by Athol Fugard, John Kani, and Winston Ntshona
- Radisson
- The Secret in the Woods or Oedipus Overcome

== 1976 ==
- The Servant of Two Masters – by Carlo Goldoni
- The Diary of Anne Frank – by Frances Goodrich and Albert Hackett
- Godspell – by Stephen Schwartz and John-Michael Tebelak
- Relatively Speaking – by Alan Ayckbourn
- Wait Until Dark – by Frederick Knott
- Last of the Red Hot Lovers – by Neil Simon
- Daughter-in-law – by D. H. Lawrence
- The Mysterious Stranger
- Gilgamesh
- Dr. Mildew's Marvelous Magical Musical Medicine Show

== 1977 ==
- The Dollar Woman – by Alden Nowlan and Walter Learning
- The Taming of the Shrew – by William Shakespeare
- The Price – by Arthur Miller
- Made in Heaven – by Georges Feydeau
- One Night Stand
- Equus – by Peter Shaffer
- The Vanishing Village
- Dr. Mildew's Marvellous Magical Musical Medicine Show
- Dash Leaves the Theatre

== 1978 ==
- The Incredible Murder of Cardinal Tosca – by Alden Nowlan and Walter Learning
- Vanities – by Jack Heifner
- Sizwe Banzi Is Dead – by Athol Fugard
- The Norman Conquests – by Alan Ayckbourn
- Man of La Mancha – book by Dale Wasserman, lyrics by Joe Darion, music by Mitch Leigh
- John Gyles: an Indian Experience by Ilkay Silk
- A Peaceable People
- All-new Dr. Mildew's Marvelous Magical Musical Medicine Show
- The Drunkard (or the Dipsomaniac Ameliorated)

== 1979 ==
- The Au Pair Man – by Hugh Leonard
- Waiting for Godot – by Samuel Beckett
- Macbeth – by William Shakespeare
- The Return of A. J. Raffles – by Graham Greene
- The Subject Was Roses – by F. D. Gilroy
- Same Time, Next Year – by Bernard Slade
- 18 Wheels – by John MacLachlan Gray
- The Clam Made a Face – by Eric Nicol
- A Marriage Proposal – by Anton Chekhov
- Box and Cox – by John Maddison Morton

== 1980 ==
- Hansel and Gretel – by the Brothers Grimm
- On Golden Pond – by Ernest Thompson
- Free at Last
- Twelfth Night – by William Shakespeare
- The Glass Menagerie – by Tennessee Williams
- Eight to the Bar – by Stephen Witkin
- Alexander's Birthday
- Winners (play)
- Prejudiced ... Who Me?
- A Clean Bill or How to Settle Accounts with a Laundress
- The Grandiosos

== 1980–1981 ==
- A Christmas Carol – by Charles Dickens
- Billy Bishop Goes to War – by John MacLachlan Gray and Eric Peterson
- Chapter Two – by Neil Simon
- The Miracle Worker – by William Gibson
- The Clown Test
- Players
- The Area Belle – by William Brough and Andrew Halliday

== 1981–1982 ==
- Talley's Folly – by Lanford Wilson
- You're a Good Man, Charlie Brown – music and lyrics by Clark Gesner, book by John Gordon
- Murder Game – by Dan Ross
- Side by Side by Sondheim
- Wuthering Heights – by Emily Brontë
- An Astral Voyage
- The Home Children
- Punch and Judy Show

== 1982–1983 ==
- Memoir
- Life with Father – by Lindsay and Crouse, adapted from the book by Clarence Day, Jr.
- Mass Appeal – by Bill C. Davis
- The Impresario / The Diary of Adam and Eve from the Apple Tree
- Arms and the Man – by George Bernard Shaw
- The Wheel (play)
- Saturday Morning Special
- TNB Magic Show

== 1983–1984 ==
- Sinners – by Norm Foster
- The Little Sweep
- Count Dracula
- Duet for One – by Tom Kempinski
- Candida – by George Bernard Shaw
- New Canadian Kid – by Dennis Foon
- The Dark Lady of the Sonnets – by George Bernard Shaw
- Bagatelle

== 1984–1985 ==
- The Melville Boys – by Norm Foster
- I'll Be Back Before Midnight
- Scrooge
- A Taste of Honey – by Shelagh Delaney
- Country Hearts – by Ted Johns and John Roby
- Little Victories / Les Petits Pouvoirs
- Maritime Mixed Grill
- Freshet

== 1985–1986 ==
- Garrison's Garage
- Can't Pay? Won't Pay!
- Female Transport
- The Mystery of the Oak Island Treasure – by Jim Betts
- The Tomorrow Box – by Anne Chislett
- The White Dogs of Texas
- Family Trappings
- Lucien – by Marshall Button
- Don Messer's Jubilee
- Buzzed
- The Boogeyman Blues

== 1986–1987 ==
- Jitters – by David French
- The Best of Tap
- Zero Hour! – by Arthur Hailey
- The Little Foxes – by Lillian Hellman
- Educating Rita – by Willy Russell
- A Child Is Crying on the Stairs
- The Black Bonspiel of Wullie MacCrimmon – by W. O. Mitchell
- Peacemaker
- How I Wonder What You Are
- The Lion, the Witch and the Wardrobe – by C. S. Lewis

== 1987–1988 ==
- My Darling Judith – by Norm Foster
- Guys and Dolls – music and lyrics by Frank Loesser, book by Jo Swerling and Abe Burrows
- McClure
- Lucien – by Marshall Button
- The Corn Is Green – by Emlyn Williams
- Corpse!
- My Memories of You
- Lockhartville
- The Late Great Date
- I Am a Bear!

== 1988–1989 ==
- Blood Relations – by Sharon Pollock
- Scapino!
- The Road to Mecca – by Athol Fugard
- Agnes of God – by John Pielmeier
- The Kite
- The Faith Healer
- You Strike the Woman, You Strike the Rock
- Getting it Straight
- Judge Prouse Presiding
- The Second City
- The Odyssey – by Derek Walcott
- Skin

== 1989–1990 ==
- Crimes of the Heart – by Beth Henley
- Salt-Water Moon – by David French
- A Moon for the Misbegotten – by Eugene O'Neill
- Loot – by Joe Orton
- Memories of You
- Four the Moment
- The Second City
- Mainline / Lifeline
- Journeys

== 1990–1991 ==
- The Affections of May – by Norm Foster
- A Christmas Carol – by Charles Dickens
- Bordertown Café – by Kelly Rebar
- Ghosts – by Henrik Ibsen
- Letter from Wingfield Farm – by Dan Needles
- Holy Ozone Trashman
- Blue Days at Sea

== 1991–1992 ==
- The Motor Trade
- Dracula – by Hamilton Deane
- Gunmetal Blues – by Marion Adler and Scott Wentworth
- The Secret Rapture
- Wingfield's Progress
- Coming Around

== 1992–1993 ==
- Wrong for Each Other
- The Winter's Tale – by William Shakespeare
- Cat on a Hot Tin Roof – by Tennessee Williams
- Italian American Reconciliation
- Wingfield's Folly
- Night Light
- Best All Around

== 1993–1994 ==
- Lucien 2
- The Secret Garden
- A Streetcar Named Desire – by Tennessee Williams
- Safe Haven – by Mary-Colin Chisholm
- Shirley Valentine – by Willy Russell
- Head a Tête
- How I Wonder What You Are

== 1994–1995 ==
- Yard Sale
- A Christmas Carol – by Charles Dickens
- If We Are Women – by Joanna McClelland Glass
- The Importance of Being Earnest – by Oscar Wilde
- The Search for Signs of Intelligent Life in the Universe
- Letter from Wingfield Farm – by Dan Needles
- Alligator Pie
- Lovers & Clowns

== 1995–1996 ==
- I'll Be Back Before Midnight
- Steel Magnolias – by Robert Harling
- A Gift to Last – by Gordon Pinsent, adapted by Alden Nowlan and Walter Learning
- The Gin Game – by D. L. Coburn
- Rock and Roll – by John MacLachlan Gray
- Lend Me a Tenor – by Ken Ludwig
- Charlotte's Web – by E. B. White
- A Marriage Proposal – by Anton Chekhov

== 1996–1997 ==
- Office Hours
- Kringle's Window
- Misery
- The Americans Are Coming
- Billy Bishop Goes to War – by John MacLachlan Gray and Eric Peterson
- The Velveteen Rabbit – by Margery Williams
- The Bishop's Candlesticks

== 1997–1998 ==
- Beauty and the Beast – by Warren Graves
- Thirteen Hands – by Carol Shields
- The Wild Guys
- Sleuth – by Anthony Shaffer
- The Short Tree and the Bird That Could Not Sing
- The Late Great Date

== 1998–1999 ==
- Driving Miss Daisy – by Alfred Uhry
- Peter Pan – by J. M. Barrie
- The Foursome
- Skylight – by David Hare
- The Last Tasmanian
- The Assignments are Murder
- The Hullabaloo Bugaboo Day

== 1999–2000 ==
- The Woman in Black – by Susan Hill
- A Christmas Carol – by Charles Dickens
- Drinking Alone
- The Passion of Narcisse Mondoux – by Gratien Gélinas
- I Do! I Do! – book and lyrics by Tom Jones, music by Harvey Schmidt
- Beo's Bedroom
- Closer to Home
- Big

== 2000–2001 ==
- Song for a New World
- Ethan Clamore
- The Attic, the Pearls and Three Fine Girls
- The Drawer Boy – by Michael Healey
- Wingfield Unbound – by Dan Needles
- The Princess and the Handmaiden
- The Compleat Wrks of Wllm Shkspr – by Jess Borgeson, Adam Long and Daniel Singer
- Grease – by Jim Jacobs and Warren Casey

== 2001–2002 ==
- Picasso at the Lapin Agile – by Steve Martin
- Anne – adapted for the stage by Paul Ledoux
- The Prisoner of Second Avenue – by Neil Simon
- Late Shift
- A Time for Magic

== 2002–2003 ==
- The Secret Garden – by Frances Hodgson Burnett
- 'Art' – by Yasmina Reza
- Jasper Station – book and lyrics by Norm Foster, music and lyrics by Steve Thomas
- Danny King of the Basement
- Mirror Game
- Hello, Dolly! – lyrics and music by Jerry Herman, book by Michael Stewart
- A Midsummer Night's Dream – by William Shakespeare

== 2003–2004 ==
- The Hobbit – by J. R. R. Tolkien
- Dear Santa
- Vinci – by Maureen Hunter
- Wingfield on Ice – by Dan Needles
- Zak and the Magic Blue Stones
- I Met a Bully on the Hill
- Secrets
- Chicago

== 2004–2005 ==
- Chairmaker
- The Cricket on the Hearth – by Charles Dickens
- Mary's Wedding
- Oh, Coward!
- Lucien Snowbird
- Lig and Bittle
- Two Weeks Twice a Year
- Wrecked
- A Chorus Line – by Michael Bennett

== 2005–2006 ==
- Here on the Flight Path
- Pinocchio – by Brian Way
- I Love You, You're Perfect, Now Change
- For the Pleasure of Seeing Her Again
- The Lion, the Witch and the Wardrobe – by C. S. Lewis
- Passing Through
- Cats – by Andrew Lloyd Webber, poems by T. S. Eliot

== 2006–2007 ==
- The Graduate – by Charles Webb
- For Art's Sake
- Smokescreen
- The Sound of Music – by Richard Rodgers and Oscar Hammerstein II
- Aladdin Jr.
- The Legend of Sleepy Hollow – by Washington Irving

== 2007–2008 ==
- Forever Plaid – by Stuart Ross
- A Christmas Carol – by Charles Dickens
- The Love List
- Chasing the Money
- The Sorcerer's Apprentice
- Beauty and the Beast – by Linda Woolverton
- Charlie and the Chocolate Factory – by Roald Dahl
- Oklahoma! – by Oscar Hammerstein II and Richard Rodgers

== 2008–2009 ==
- The Rocky Horror Show – by Richard O'Brien
- Narnia – by C. S. Lewis
- Tuesdays with Morrie – by Mitch Albom
- Guys and Dolls – by Abe Burrows and Jo Swerling
- Oliver Twist – by Charles Dickens
- The Secret Garden – by Frances Hodgson Burnett

== 2009–2010 ==
- Doubt A Parable – by John Patrick Shanley
- It's A Wonderful Life – by Philip Grecian
- Skin Flick – by Norm Foster
- The Bricklin: An Automotive Fantasy
- Annie – by Thomas Meehan
- Dear Edwina – by Marcy Heisler
- Alice in Wonderland – by Lewis Carroll

== 2010–2011 ==
- Feelgood
- Treasure Island – by Robert Louis Stevenson
- Hockey Dreams – by David Adams Richards
- The Bricklin: An Automotive Fantasy
- Les Misérables – by Claude-Michel Schönberg and Alain Boublil
- Our Town – by Thornton Wilder
- Bugsy Malone – by Alan Parker and Paul Williams

== 2011–2012 ==
- A Doll's House – by Henrik Ibsen
- The 39 Steps – by Alfred Hitchcock
- The Gifts of the Magi – by O. Henry
- The Dollar Woman – by Norm Foster and Alden Nowlan
- The Musical of Musicals (The Musical!) – by Joanne Bogart and Eric Rockwell
- The Wizard of Oz – by L. Frank Baum
- The Pirates of Penzance – by Sir Arthur Sullivan
- The Chocolate War – by Robert Cormier

== 2012–2013 ==
- Oleanna – by David Mamet
- Hilda's Yard – by Norm Foster
- It's a Wonderful Life – by Philip Grecian
- Little Shop of Horrors – by Howard Ashman
- West Side Story – by Arthur Laurents
- The Little Mermaid – by Doug Wright
- Peter Pan – by J. M. Barrie

== 2013–2014 ==
- RED – by John Logan
- The Net, a Tragedy of the Sea – by Marcel-Romain Theriault
- Private Lives – by Noël Coward
- The Last Five Years – by Jason Robert Brown
- Guys and Dolls – by Abe Burrows and Jo Swerling
- Thoroughly Modern Millie Jr. – by Jeanine Tesori
- Lilly Alta. – by Ken Dylba

== 2014–2015 ==
- Frankenstein, The Man Who Became God – by Walter Learning and Alden Nowlan
- A Christmas Carol – by Charles Dickens, adapted by Caleb Marshall, Michael Doherty, and Tania Breen
- On a First Name Basis – by Norm Foster
- Beaverbrook – by David Adams Richards
- The Indigenous Peoples Project
- Somme Letters Home – Letters of Private John Bapst Cronin
- The Drowsy Chaperone – by Don McKellar and Bob Martin
- The Sound of Music – by Oscar Hammerstein II and Richard Rodgers

== 2015-2016 ==
- You Play Beautifully - by Thomas Morgan Jones
- Life, Death and the Blues - by Raoul Bhaneja
- Vigil - by Morris Panych
- Watching Glory Die - by Judith Thompson
- Little Women, The Musical - book by Allan Knee, lyrics by Mindi Dickstein, and music by Jason Howland
- The Space Between - by Tania Breen
- Returning Fire - by Ryan Griffith
- Marion Bridge - by Daniel MacIvor
- Mary Poppins - music and lyrics by Richard M. Sherman and Robert B. Sherman (aka the Sherman Brothers), with additional music and lyrics by George Stiles and Anthony Drewe, and a script by Julian Fellowes.

== 2016-2017 ==
- A Sunday Affair - by Gabrielle Houle, Thomas Morgan Jones and Richard Lee.
- Ghost Light - by Shawn Wright
- The Snow Queen - by Hans Christian Andresen | Adapted by Thomas Morgan Jones
- The Damsel In Distress Who Saved Herself - by Kira Smith
- The Boat - Ryan Griffith
- Shrek, The Musical - Music by Jeanni Tesori | Book and Lyrics by David Lindsay-Abaire

== 2017-2018 ==
- Fortune of Wolves - by Ryan Griffith
- A Christmas Carol - by Charles Dickens | Adapted by Thomas Morgan Jones
- A Herman Tale - by Paul McAllister, adapted by Tania Breen
- Goodbye Marianne - by Irene Kirstein Watts
- Finding Wolastoq Voice - by Natalie Sappier
- Beauty and the Beast - Music by Alan Menken, Lyrics by Howard Ashman & Tim Rice, Book by Linda Woolverton

== 2018-2019 ==
- Any Given Moment - Kim Parkhill
- Come Down From Up River - by Norm Foster (a production from The Foster Festival)
- The Lion, The Witch and The Wardrobe - C. S. Lewis
- Gretel & Hansel - Written by Brothers Grimm | Adapted by Thomas Morgan Jones
- Sania The Destroyer - by Mona'a Malik
- A Brief History of the Maritimes and Everywhere Else - by Ryan Griffith
- The Wizard of Oz - By L. Frank Baum, with Music and Lyrics, by Harold Arlen and E. Y. Harburg, Background Music by Herbert Stothart, Dance and Vocal Arrangements by Peter Howard, Orchestration by Larry Wilcox, Adapted by John Kane for the Royal Shakespeare Company, Based upon the Classic Motion Picture owned by Turner Entertainment Co. and distributed in all media by Warner Bros.

== 2019-2020 ==
- 1979 - by Michael Healey
- It's A Wonderful Life: A Live Radio Play - by Frank Capra
- Boys, Girls, and Other Mythological Creatures - by Mark Crawford
- It's a Girl - by Michelle Raine and Alexis Milligan

== 2020-2021 ==
- Post Script

== 2021-2022 ==
- Miss Bennett: Christmas at Pemberley - by Lauren Gunderson and Margot Melcon

== 2022-2023 ==
- Bluebirds - by Vern Thiessen
- The Wickhams: Christmas at Pemberley - by Lauren Gunderson and Margot Melcon
- Resident Aliens - by Don Hannah
- S.T.O.P - by Santiago Guzmán
- Altar - by Santiago Guzmán

== 2023-2024 ==
- Wood Buffalo - by Len Falkenstein
- All I Want for Christmas - by Rebecca Northan
- Becca - by Melanie Léger
- Sidewalk Chalk - by Cliff Cardinal
- Beneath Springhill - by Beau Dixon, with music and lyrics provided by Rob Fortan and Susan Newman

== 2024-2025 ==
- Bluebirds - by Vern Thiessen
- Greetings - by Don Hannah
- Songs from Finding Wolastoq Voice - by Samaqani Cocahq
- Tree Boy - by Michele Riml
- Tuhkiyawolotipon - by Samaqani Cocahq
- O'Brien - by Thomas Hodd

== 2025-2026 ==
- The Greatest Play in the History of the World - by Ian Kershaw
- A Canyon Contained - by Jena MacLean
- The Velveteen Rabbit - by Tania Breen
- Heroine - by Karen Bassett
