= Transit of Venus (opera) =

Opera in three acts by Victor Davies

Transit of Venus is an opera in three acts by Victor Davies. The English libretto is by Canadian playwright Maureen Hunter based on her play of the same name first produced at the Manitoba Theatre Centre in November 1992.

== Performance history ==
The opera was first performed by Manitoba Opera on November 24, 2007.

== Roles ==
Role	Voice type	Premiere Cast, 24 November 2007 (Conductor: James Meena)
Le Gentil, age 35, astronomer	baritone	Russell Braun
Celeste, age 15, his fiancée	soprano	Monica Huisman
Margot, age 36, his mother’s companion	mezzo-soprano	Jean Stilwell
Demarais, age 18, his assistant	tenor	Colin Ainsworth
Madame Sylvie, age 65, his mother	mezzo-soprano	Judith Forst
Male and female servants chorus

== Synopsis ==
The story is based on the expeditions of the 18th-century French astronomer, Guillaume le Gentil de la Galaisière. He attempted to record the transit of the planet Venus across the Sun as a way of estimating the distance between the Earth and the Sun. Celeste, his fiancée, loves him at first but then turns to his assistant, Demarais.
