= Humble Boy =

2001 English play by Charlotte Jones

Humble Boy is a 2001 English play by Charlotte Jones. The play was presented in association with Matthew Byam Shaw and Anna Mackmin, and was first performed on the Cottesloe stage of the Royal National Theatre on 9 August 2001.

== Background ==
Humble Boy is a play inspired by Hamlet. In an online review, the scope of the play is addressed as follows: "Charlotte Jones knows her Stoppard, her Hamlet, her Ayckbourn, and among other things perhaps the fourth book of Virgil's Georgics on the subject of Aristaeus's bees".

Jones draws upon techniques reminiscent of Tom Stoppard by utilizing multiple layers of what seem to be random events, people, movements, and philosophies. She "offers a play with inklings of the aforementioned Hamlet, bees, horticulture, theoretical physics (specifically, superstring theory), anosmia, swing music, and the elusiveness as well as the playfulness of language."

Echoes of playwright Alan Ayckbourn are also apparent in Jones's work. "Set entirely outdoors in the Humbles' garden (Ayckbourn territory), we witness the Humbles' domestic struggle (definitely Ayckbourn here), Felix's confrontation with his past, and his own mental difficulties in maintaining his familial and professional responsibilities."

== Plot synopsis ==
Felix Humble returns to his family home in the countryside of England after receiving word of the death of his father, James Humble. Once he returns home, he discovers that his mother, Flora Humble, has got rid of all of her husband's belongings, including the bees which he kept. The reunion of mother and son is not as pleasant as one would imagine; old animosities are sparked between the two as Flora blames Felix for embarrassing her at James's funeral by running away when it was Felix's turn to deliver a eulogy. On top of that Felix, discovers that Flora intends to marry a man named George Pye, the complete opposite of the intellectual and passionate James.

Throughout the summer, the distance between Flora and Felix grows. Flora sends her friend Mercy to befriend Felix and relay information back. Felix can see right through his mother's devious agenda and finds that the gardener Jim, who is ignored by everyone, is the only one in whom he can confide.

Felix reunites with an ex-girlfriend, Rosie Pye, who is the daughter of George Pye. She claims to have changed her life after breaking up with Felix and becoming a nurse and a single mother. Rosie tries using sex to ease Felix's tension, only to be interrupted by the arrival of Flora and George. Rosie reveals to Felix that they have been having an affair for a long time, even when James was alive. She also tells Felix before she leaves that he is the father of her daughter, Felicity.

Felix becomes distraught and even suicidal. A confrontation occurs at a garden dinner party where Flora plans to officially announce her wedding with George. After a period of emotional outbursts, ending with Mercy leaving after being harassed by Flora, a moment of revelation occurs as Felix reminds Flora of the intelligence and devotion of James to his unfaithful wife. Flora cancels her wedding and sends George off. As Felix and Flora have a moment of forgiveness in the garden, Flora finally gives notice to the gardener Jim, who turns out to be the spirit of James Humble.

== Character guide ==
Felix Humble – A mid-30s theoretical astrophysicist from Cambridge. He is the main character and is noticeable for his nervous stutter.

Flora Humble – Beautiful and self-centred, Flora is the mother of Felix. Her need for absolute power contributes to problems in relationships with the people around her.

George Pye – Confident, well-built, modern, and a fan of big band music. George is the complete opposite of James Humble, the deceased father of Felix. He plans to marry Flora.

Rosie Pye – Daughter of George and former girlfriend of Felix. She is a nurse and also has a 7-year-old daughter that she believes to be Felix's.

Jim – The gardener of the estate. He is an old man in his 60s. He is virtually ignored by everyone in the play until the end. He is the only person in whom Felix can truly confide.

Mercy Lott – Friend (although seemingly a slave) of Flora, she is kind but doesn't seem to be all there. She has a secret crush on George Pye.

== Character analysis ==
Felix in many regards acts as a modern-day Hamlet; he has a brilliant but troubled mind, will not let go of the death of his father, and falls into depression and even contemplates suicide. His work involves finding the “mother” of all theories to “unite” all aspects of physics which “runs parallel to his inability to comprehend the union of opposites that was his parents’ marriage.”

== Themes ==
Dysfunctional relationships – The theme of socially impaired relationships is very apparent in Humble Boy and applies in one way or another to each character's relationships. The obvious distance between mother and son, the ex-girlfriend who keeps her daughter’s paternity secret for seven years, the slave-friend who crushes on her best friend’s fiancé, and the resentment of his mother's new fiancé are just a few examples of dysfunctional relationships.

Reversed social hierarchy – The stereotype of the social structure in which "men" are the leaders and hold the most power is reversed. Flora acts as the head of the Humble estate and everyone else is more or less her pawn. This situation parallels the social construction of a bee colony in which the queen bee is the most powerful.

Humility – The family name Humble evokes the ongoing debate between classical Christian views of humility. In the Christian view, humility and self-sacrifice are primary virtues of a well lived life. But in the classical Aristotelian view, the humble man's lack of appropriate self-respect makes him just as foolish as the vain man.

== Genre ==
Humble Boy adheres loosely to the guidelines of Ancient Greek comedy. The most apparent aspect is a visit to the “green world,” which David Rush explains as any place where a character runs off to and experiences a change. In Humble Boy, Felix leaves his “real” world at Cambridge knowing in the back of his mind the distraught relationship between him and his mother and goes to the “green world” (the family home) where that relationship is repaired. Also a moment of cognition or "knowing" occurs where the characters are enlightened with a moment of insight.

== Style ==
The style of the play is expressionist. A specific lens or point of view is given from the perspective of Felix and his inner state. The action often seems to occur inside the mind of Felix and he is considered the victim in the play. The play's overall objective is a quest for a state of clarity.

== Spectacle ==
The play is set in a pretty country garden, which may include a house or glass conservatory from which character enter into the garden. There is a patio area with a path through the garden. At the back there is an area for gardening tools; a chair or stool. At the end of the garden is a large beehive. There is an apple tree with some overhanging branches with a few apples.

== Music ==
Music is mainly used in the play to transition between acts. Jim the gardener is often found humming to a tune. Many songs are also suggested and played throughout the play, as follows:

- Nikolai Rimsky-Korsakov's "Flight of the Bumble Bee"
- Glenn Miller's "In the Mood"
- Glenn Miller's "Don't Sit Under the Apple Tree (with Anyone Else but Me)"
- Glenn Miller's "Moonlight Serenade"

== About the author ==
Charlotte Jones studied English at Balliol College, Oxford University, before training to become an actress. She worked for six years in theatre and television and supported herself by working as a waitress. Her urge to write plays didn't arise from a lifelong ambition; rather, she was inspired to do so because up until then her career was that of a frustrated actor desperate for work. Her first play, Airswimming, debuted at Battersea Arts Centre in 1998. She then proceeded to write In Flame and Martha, Josie and the Chinese Elvis before writing Humble Boy.

== Production history ==
Humble Boy premiered at the Royal National Theatre in 2001, directed by John Caird, with the leads played by Simon Russell Beale and Diana Rigg (Felicity Kendall took over from Diana Rigg when the play later transferred to the West End), and also featuring Cathryn Bradshaw, Denis Quilley, Marcia Warren and William Gaunt. This production won the 2001 Critics' Circle Theatre Award for Best New Play and two 2001 Olivier Awards (for Best Actress in a Supporting Role, for Marcia Warren; and Best Set Designer for Tim Hatley).

The play toured the UK in 2003 with Hayley Mills in the lead role, Flora. It has since also been produced at the Tarragon Theatre in Toronto, the Vancouver Playhouse, the Theatre Calgary, the Citadel Theatre in Edmonton, Alberta, the Manitoba Theatre Centre and (in 2018) the Orange Tree Theatre in Richmond, London.
