= Alexandra Posadzki =

Canadian journalist

Alexandra Posadzki is a Canadian author and business journalist for The Globe and Mail. She is best known for her reporting on a feud within Canada's prominent Rogers family that has been likened to a real-life version of HBO's hit show Succession.

== Biography ==
Posadzki graduated from York University with an honors B.A. in psychology and English. She earned a Master of Journalism degree from Toronto Metropolitan University in 2013 and completed the Canadian Securities Course. At journalism school, Posadzki took an investigative journalism course that she credits with teaching her the skills of the trade. She lives in Toronto.

== Journalism career ==
Posadzki's journalism career began at the York University student newspaper, the Excalibur. She went on to work for several news outlets including the Toronto Star, BNN, Global News and The Canadian Press, where she covered the banking and real estate industries for three years. She joined The Globe and Mail as a business reporter in 2017.

== Significant stories ==
=== QuadrigaCX ===
In 2018, while she was The Globe's capital markets reporter, Posadzki started hearing rumours that Michael Patryn, one of the co-founders of Canadian cryptocurrency exchange QuadrigaCX, was a convicted felon who had changed his name after serving jail time in the United States. Around that time, users of the exchange began writing to her that they were having difficulty accessing their funds. After reporting that the Canadian Imperial Bank of Commerce had frozen millions of dollars held within bank accounts belonging to one of Quadriga's payment processors, Posadzki became the victim of a SIM swap scam.

In 2018 and 2019, Posadzki, Joe Castaldo and other Globe reporters broke a series of scoops about QuadrigaCX, which collapsed into bankruptcy after its founder, Gerald Cotten, died under mysterious circumstances, leaving users unable to access hundreds of millions of dollars. The Ontario Securities Commission later published a report declaring that QuadrigaCX operated like a Ponzi scheme.

Posadzki was featured in two documentaries about Quadriga. The first, which was part of the 2021 Hot Docs Festival on CBC, is called Dead Man's Switch: A Crypto Mystery. The second, a Netflix documentary called Trust No One: The Hunt for the Crypto King, was criticized by The New York Times for being overly sensational

=== Rogers v. Rogers ===
In the fall of 2021, Posadzki and Globe columnist Andrew Willis published a report in The Globe and Mail that the departure of the chief financial officer of Rogers Communications was the result of a power struggle within the wireless giant that had initially aimed to oust its chief executive officer, Joe Natale.

As the crisis within the company and its controlling family deepened, Posadzki continued to break stories, including about the infamous pocket dial that exposed the plan to unseat Natale. Her reporting on the saga won multiple 2021 Canada Best in Business Awards from The Society for Advancing Business Editing and Writing, including in the "Scoop" and "Beat reporting" categories. In November 2021, The Globe reported that Posadzki had signed a book deal with McClelland & Stewart.

Although originally slated for the fall of 2023, Rogers v. Rogers: The Battle for Control of Canada's Telecom Empire was published on Feb. 13, 2024. Posadzki conducted more than 100 interviews for the book as well as consulting extensive secondary sources. Her book debuted at the top of the Toronto Star's original non-fiction and Canadian non-fiction bestseller lists and was also on The Globe and Mail and the CBC's bestseller lists.

David Moscrop, writing for The Globe and Mail, described Rogers v. Rogers as a "must-read," while the Financial Times noted that the book "finds resonance in a moment of collective fixation with "eat the rich" media." Dimitry Anastakis, writing for the Literary Review of Canada, praised Posadzki for providing "a public service, one that not only unspools a good yarn but also does what the best and bravest journalism should do: speak truth to power." Anastakis's only criticism of the book was its lack of visuals.
