= Trust No One: The Hunt for the Crypto King =

2022 American documentary film

- Directed by: Luke Sewell
- Music by: David Schweitzer
- Production company: Minnow Films
- Distributed by: Netflix
- Release date: March 30, 2022
- Language: English

Trust No One: The Hunt for the Crypto King is a Netflix original documentary film directed by Luke Sewell. Its story follows a group of cryptocurrency investors who lost money in the collapse of the QuadrigaCX exchange. They investigate the untimely death of its founder, Gerry Cotten, and attempt to recover the $250 million that they suspect he stole from them. The film was released on March 30, 2022.

Between March 27, 2022 and April 3, 2022, the film saw over 12 million viewing hours on Netflix globally.
