= Kenneth Brown (playwright) =

Canadian writer

Kenneth Brown is a playwright, actor, director and producer (born 20 January 1954) who has been active in theatre since 1971. He is an author or co-author of the following plays:

- Bombs!
- Letters in Wartime
- Life After Hockey (1985) (There is also a film version)
- My Father's House
- Nightlight
- North of America (There is a German radio play version of this, called Nach Manitoba which was translated by Werner Richter for Westdeutscher Rundfunk and went on air for the first time in 1993)
- Sparks
- The Adventures of Joseph Andrews (1998)
- The Bridge
- 2 Balance (2000)
- Be A Man (with Ribbit Productions, 2001)
- Lewis Lapham Live
- Spiral Dive Trilogy (2008)
- Cowboy Gothic (2011)
- The Gambling Show (with Ribbit Productions, 2010)
