= Transit of Venus (play) =

Play by Canadian playwright Maureen Hunter

Transit of Venus is a play by Canadian playwright Maureen Hunter. It was first produced at the Manitoba Theatre Centre in November 1992.

The play is based on the life of Guillaume Le Gentil (1725–1792), a gentleman astronomer. In the play, he is obsessed with observing the transit of Venus. He leaves Celeste, the girl who loves him, to embark on an expedition to observe it. He returns after six years, having failed to observe the transit. He immediately makes preparations for a new expedition to observe the next transit.

Some artistic license was taken: the real-life Guillaume Le Gentil did not return until after the second transit, remaining overseas during the eight-year interim.

The play was subsequently performed across Canada, by the Royal Shakespeare Company and the BBC.

== Opera version ==
The play was transformed into an opera of the same name with libretto by Maureen Hunter and music by Victor Davies. This was presented by Manitoba Opera on November 24, 2007.
