= Theatre Projects Manitoba =

Theatre company based in Winnipeg

Theatre Projects Manitoba (TPM) is a professional theatre company based in Winnipeg, Manitoba. It was founded in 1990 by playwright Harry Rintoul in response to the perceived need for a strong local professional company to provide opportunities for Manitoban artists and to put local stories on the stage. With close ties to the Manitoba Association of Playwrights (MAP) and a passionate faith in this region’s playwrights, TPM was established as the only professional company dedicated to producing the works of Manitoba playwrights. Since its creation TPM has produced more than 50 new Manitoba works, as well as presenting new work from across the country. Theatre Projects Manitoba is a member of PACT, the Professional Association of Canadian Theatres.

== History ==
Theatre Projects Manitoba was founded by playwright Harry Rintoul in 1990 in an effort to solve what he and others viewed as the problem of limited opportunities for local professional theatre artists to work in Manitoba. In its first season Theatre Projects presented the Manitoba premiere of Michel Tremblay's Albertine in Five Times and plays by two local playwrights, David Demchuck and Ellen Peterson. The next season included the homegrown work of Michael Nathanson, who would go on to garner a Governor General's Award nomination for his play Talk and become the artistic director of Winnipeg Jewish Theatre, followed by Vern Thiessen, now a Governor General's Award winner and the artistic director of Workshop West in Edmonton, and Yvette Nolan, who went on to head Canada's leading aboriginal company, Native Earth Performing Arts, in Toronto from 2003 to 2011.

In 2015 Theatre Projects opened its 25th season with Michael Healey's Proud and closed it with Nassim Soleimanpour's White Rabbit, Red Rabbit two plays which have both generated controversy.

== Artistic Directors ==
Harry Rintoul (1990 - 1994)

B. Pat Burns (1994-1995)

Bruce Mcmanus (1995-2000)

Margo Charlton (2000-2002)

Ken Brand (2002-2005)

Ardith Boxall (2005–Present)
