= Trying (play) =

2014 play by Joanna Glass

- Written by: Joanna Glass
- Characters: Francis Biddle; Sarah Schorr
- Subject: Aging
- Genre: Drama
- Setting: Wellfleet, Massachusetts, 1967

Premiere
- Date: March 29, 2004
- Place: Victory Gardens Theater; Chicago, Illinois

Trying is a drama by Canadian-born playwright Joanna Glass that premiered at Chicago's Victory Gardens Theater on March 29, 2004. The two-act play depicts the final year in the life of Francis Biddle—the United States attorney general under President Franklin D. Roosevelt and chief judge of the Nuremberg trials—as it was seen through the eyes of his then twenty-five-year-old assistant, Sarah Schorr. As the young woman relates to the audience, she is merely the latest and coincidentally the last in a long and unsuccessful line of personal secretaries, all of whom have disappointed Biddle in some way. Much of the story revolves around issues of aging and the breakdown of communication over divisions of age and class. The work is derived from Glass's own experiences as Biddle's assistant from 1967 to 1968.

== Production history ==
The original production was directed by Victory Gardens' associate artistic director Sandy Shinner and starred Tony Award-winning actor Fritz Weaver as Biddle and Kati Brazda as Sarah. After an extended run in Chicago, it transferred to an off-Broadway run at the Promenade Theater on New York's Upper West Side on October 13, 2004, and ran until January 2 the following year.

The success of Trying came as a surprise to Glass, as the play was only picked up as a replacement for Claudia Allen's Hanging Fire when the show's lead actress, Julie Harris, suffered a stroke and was unable to go on. The original Chicago production of Trying was lauded by critics and audiences alike and was nominated for several Joseph Jefferson Awards including "Best Production," "Best Direction," and "Best New Work," which it won. The two actors in the Victory Gardens premiere also received Jeff nods, with Weaver taking home the trophy for Best Actor of 2004 for his work in the production.

Following the play's transfer off-Broadway, the production continued to be met with high praise, with critics calling the relationship between Weaver and Brazda some of the best acting seen in New York City that season. Glass's playscript, however, found less marked success, with Christine Howey of Cleveland's The Plain Dealer and others criticizing the plot for being too predictable. The production, largely financed by Chicagoans, closed early following financial disappointments. Despite this, though, Trying continues to be revived regularly at regional theatres across the United States and Canada, including at the South Carolina Repertory Company in 2005, Old Globe in San Diego in 2006, the Citadel Theatre in Edmonton, Alberta, Canada in 2006, the Colony Theatre in Los Angeles in 2007, Rubicon Theatre in Ventura, California in 2010, and Cesear's Forum in Cleveland, Ohio in 2011.
