= Wingfield Series =

Series of one-man plays by Dan Needles

The Wingfield Cycle is a Canadian series of seven one-man plays - Letter from Wingfield Farm, Wingfield's Progress, Wingfield's Folly, Wingfield Unbound, Wingfield on Ice, Wingfield's Inferno and Wingfield Lost and Found - written by Dan Needles, directed by Douglas Beattie and performed by Rod Beattie. They tell the story of Walt Wingfield, a stockbroker-turned-farmer living near the fictional small town Larkspur, Ontario in Persephone Township and his various misadventures while trying to make a living in the agriculture business. The plays progress as a series of letters written by Walt to his friend, the editor of the Larkspur newspaper. The plays were later collected and edited into a series of half-hour television shows, which were essentially video recordings of the plays.

== Plays in the Wingfield Cycle ==
=== Letter from Wingfield Farm ===
Walt Wingfield, a Toronto stockbroker, decides to take up farming, and buys the old Fisher place in Persephone Township. He meets his new neighbours, including Freddie, his nephews Willie and Dave, Don, the elderly Squire, and Jimmy.

Episode 1 Following in the footsteps of Thoreau, stockbroker Walt Wingfield acquires 200 acres (0.81 km^{2}) north of Toronto and sets out to farm "using some of the old ways." A broken-down racehorse and a sick duck form the basis for his first misadventures.

Episode 2 Stockbroker-turned-farmer Walt Wingfield gets introduced to doing business Persephone-style when he sets out to buy a cord of firewood. Then neighbour Freddy and his nephews show up at Walt's place for a surprise, late-night visit.

Episode 3 An early morning fire alarm at Freddy's turns into a public embarrassment for Walt. Then the neighbours decide Walt and his horses are working too slowly to get a crop and plant his fields for him—armed with the latest technology.

Episode 4 Fed up with his horses, Mortgage and Feedbin, Walt goes in search of an older, wiser animal at Freddy's. When he meets an ancient draft horse named King, it's love at first sight. And borrowing a manure spreader from next door turns into an all-day excursion.

Episode 5 Walt faces the prospect of sending his pigs to the slaughter-house, Walt and Jimmy almost come to grief trying to break in Walt's team of horses, and, as the February snow flies and the bills mount, Walt contemplates returning to work part-time at the brokerage firm.

=== Wingfield's Progress ===
Walt and his friends attempt to halt a condominium development on the 7th line known as Persephone Glen Homes. Attempts include running for office and using the code of farming.

Episode 6 Freddy and Maggie get spooked when Walt and Jimmy show up at the farm one winter night, escorted by the police, and Walt's hackles are raised when he discovers survey stakes for a condominium development in the field across the road.

Episode 7 Walt gets snagged by the police while "practicing" fishing, nearly comes to grief while fixing the barn roof with Freddy and Jimmy, and takes on Township Council over a condominium development proposal.

Episode 8 Walt's new geese turn out to be a problem, and his campaign to run for Township council hits a bump, but he does score a small victory in the fund-raising department.

Episode 9 Don helps Walt deal with a hen-house predator, Walt tries a door-knocking campaign in his bid for a seat on Township council, and the boys reflect on what country living might have to offer a city dweller.

Episode 10 Walt and his neighbours stage a devastating display of farming-at-its-messiest to discourage prospective clients of the condominium development across the road.

=== Wingfield's Folly ===
Walt questions his farming lifestyle after a letter from his firm in Toronto. He accepts a marriage proposal from Maggie, Freddie's sister.

Episode 11 Once again in winter's grip, Walt looks after chores at Don's, risks life and limb trying to get his horses out of the barn, and acquires an "enforcer", Mrs. Pankhurst, the goat.

Episode 12 Freddy declares that Walt's newly acquired but ancient tractor needs a "tune-up" and takes it to pieces in his front yard. Meanwhile, Maggie helps Walt deliver a new lamb back at the farm.

Episode 13 Walt discovers the secret to working with his old draft horse, King, prints his own currency and persuades his neighbours to join him in a closed economy on The Seventh Line. Then disaster strikes at the turkey shed.

Episode 14 Walt's currency scheme hits a snag when Dry Cry starts counterfeiting the "Walt". Freddy and Don organize a "work party" to deal with the problem at Dry Cry's store after dark.

Episode 15 Walt gets in a fight with Maggie over an old boyfriend who is trying to swindle her and determines to sell out and move back to the city. Freddy is hired as auctioneer.

=== Wingfield Unbound ===
Walt attempts to convince the community that the Hollyhock Mill would make a great historic museum. Maggie turns out to be expecting.

Episode 16 Freddy and Walt try to duplicate the recipe after it appears Spike the hound has eaten the casserole Maggie made for the institute. The Squire's memory-loss prompts Walt to look for a museum site to protect local heritage.

Episode 17 Walt and Freddy play vet to a stiff sheep and Walt buys a fine new ram for the flock which no one else seems to want. It isn't long before Walt finds out why.

Episode 18 When Walt takes his museum proposal to Township council he gets an enthusiastic response - until he tells them he wants to house it in the Hollyhock Mill. Back at Freddy's, Walt hears the story of the Miller's Curse!

Episode 19 Walt is pressured into helping Willy and Dave out of a jam over a cattle pyramid scheme and attempts to haul the haunted millstone out of the stream at Hollyhock - with near fatal results.

Episode 20 Walt and Maggie's farm is the only one on The Seventh Line hit with a violent wind storm, then The Squire accompanies Walt to the mill stream at Hollyhock where Walt has yet another narrow escape.

=== Wingfield on Ice ===
Persephone is hit with an ice storm, Maggie gives birth to their daughter, Hope.

Episode 21 With Maggie expecting, the neighbours on The Seventh Line are worried Walt may be cracking up. Walt discovers The Squire has a brother he doesn't talk to.

Episode 22 With a baby on the way, Walt Wingfield tried to spread harmony in the township only to get mixed up in some old and not-so-old local feuds.

Episode 23 Funeral arrangements for Walt's goat, Mrs. Pankhurst, are complicated by an unwanted police escort, a severe ice storm and widespread power outages.

Episode 24 Ice still blankets Persephone Township but the locals are planning pot luck at the community hall and Walt notices tensions among his neighbours are easing.

Episode 25 Maggie Wingfield gives birth in the middle of the ice storm without a doctor present; The Squire's brother, Lucky Gus, comes home.

=== Wingfield's Inferno ===
The Orange Hall catches fire. Or did it? Hope says her first word.

Episode 26 Baby Hope is taking her first steps and Walt and Maggie fear they may have to get rid of Spike the hound; fire strikes the community hall in Larkspur.

Episode 27 Livestock woes plague Walt as he inadvertently hobbles his prize filly Dividend and tries to outwit a skunk that is stealing eggs from the barn.

Episode 28 Harold sets Walt up as chairman of the new hall committee without being candid about the chances of getting the project launched; Walt's chicken woes continue.

Episode 29 The hall committee hatches a new building scheme; Willy and Dave find a way to introduce Walt's filly to the race track; and Walt and Maggie witch for water.

Episode 30 Walt's filly Dividend makes her race track debut and Walt pulls wool over the eyes of the local MP with the help of the entire community.

=== Wingfield Lost and Found ===
This is the final play of the series and focuses on Walt wanting to be a gentleman farmer, which he still hasn't yet. The play was inspired by Dan Needles' well going dry.

== Characters ==
=== The Seventh Line (Main Characters) ===
Walt Wingfield - The newest resident of the seventh line and a former chairman of the board of a large Bay Street brokerage house. Walt is in his fifties and became disillusioned about his life in high finance. Walt is attempting to farm his 100-acre (0.40 km^{2}) property using little or no technological help, much to the confusion and amusement of his neighbours. Until he arrives at the seventh line, he has been a lifelong bachelor. His farm is known as "The Old Fisher Place" although "Fisher" is the most common name in the locality.

Freddy - Walt's best friend and immediate neighbour. Freddy is a jack-of-all-trades with a distinct stutter who ekes out an existence as a farmer, auctioneer and middleman. His farm is known as "The Old Haddock Place", after his mother's family.

Maggie - Freddie's sister, a woman in her thirties who develops into Walt's love interest and later his wife. Unlike her brother, Maggie is rather level-headed, intelligent, and is willing to take initiative, including opening her own business. Freddie rarely sees her than anything other than someone who does his cooking.

The Squire - An elderly gentleman who owns the farm across from Walt. He lives on his pension income plus whatever rental income he can get for his land. His name is Baxter Fortesque, but no one in Larkspur refers to him as anything other than "The Squire". He inherited his farm when his older brother Augustus (aka "Lucky Gus") ran away with a Catholic woman after World War II in violation of their parent's Protestant beliefs. The Squire earns a good but difficult living from his farm which is fully modernized. By contrast, Gus became very rich when all of his property was appropriated for private or public purposes. The Squire and Gus have not spoken to each other in over fifty years.

Don - Another of Walt's neighbours and a successful dairy farmer, something Walt puts down to the fact that Don has in excess of half-a-million dollars in capital equipment for the purpose. Don is probably the neighbour who is the most exasperated by Walt's attempts to farm with antiquated equipment and is always urging him to at least work with equipment that is not clearly obsolete.

=== Minor characters ===
Ed - The editor of the Larkspur Free Press & Economist, the local weekly paper. Ed bookends each episode of the television series, as well as each of the stage plays.

Willy and Dave Haddock - Freddie and Maggie's nephews. Depicted as being not too bright, but have great skills with both machinery and animals.

Dry Cry - The nickname of the manager of the local Co-op store, Mr. McKelvie. McKelvie owns several of Larkspur's major supply businesses and is the town's leading employer. Don gave him the name after noticing his voice always sounds like he is crying, but he never sees any tears. Drycry is clearly the most untrustworthy character in the series and is always trying to take advantage of Walt.

Harold - Formerly the town clerk of Larkspur until the municipal government was merged into a larger region, but in a testament to his resiliency he becomes the chief administrative officer of the new regional municipality. Harold has a helpful exterior, and often comes through in the end, but is not above manipulating Walt in the process.

Jimmy - Freddie's hired hand. Jimmy is a slight man at least 80 years old who still puts in a full day's work on most days. He emigrated from Ireland before World War II.

Darcy Dixon - A lawyer and property developer from Toronto. Dixon buys 50 acres (200,000 m^{2}) on the opposite side of the Seventh Line from Walt with plans to build condominiums on the site. Walt immediately opposes the plan, but at first his neighbours support Dixon's plan for the little used land because of the additional property taxes. However, as Dixon starts taking objection to normal farming methods (like spreading manure), the seventh line starts to turn against him.

== Novelization ==
Dan Needles has also published these plays as novels. Letters From Wingfield Farm covers the first three plays; Wingfield's Hope: More Letters from Wingfield Farm, the last three; and Wingfield's World, which covers all seven plays.
