= Dan Needles =

Canadian writer

Dan Needles CM is best known as the playwright behind the popular Wingfield Series, which has played across Canada for many years. It was performed at the Stratford Festival of Canada, Mirvish Productions Toronto and was aired, in part, on the Canadian Broadcasting Corporation and the Bravo Channel.

== Biography ==
Dan was born in Toronto July 27th 1951 in Toronto Ontario, to Dorothy-Jane Needles (broadcaster and writer) and George William Needles (Stratford Festival stage actor and Veteran). Raised partly in the city and the country. His mother moved the family out of the city each spring to a hobby farm near Rosemont, Ontario where he and his siblings tended to a herd of Jersey cows and worked on the neighbouring farms of the 7th Line.

After high school, Dan worked for a year milking cows and chasing sheep in the backcountry of Australia. He piled lumber in a sawmill in northern British Columbia for a summer and spent another cycling around England and France exploring battlefields, serving beer in a pub and picking agricultural crops. Needles studied economics at the University of Toronto and was awarded a degree in 1977.

Before turning his hand to writing plays, Dan worked as a journalist, speechwriter and insurance executive. He was editor of the Free Press & Economist in 1974, a small town weekly newspaper near the family farm in southern Ontario. There he created a column called the Letter from Wingfield Farm, which became the basis for the later stage plays.

He served as a speechwriter and legislative assistant to cabinet minister George McCague in the Ontario government from 1976-81 at Queen’s Park in Toronto. In 1981 he was director of public affairs for Canada’s oldest life insurance company, Canada Life.

In 1985, Needles launched the longest running series in Canadian history with 'Letters From Wingfield Farm'. Six sequels followed, including Wingfield's Progress (1987), Wingfield's Folly (1990), Wingfield Unbound (1997), Wingfield on Ice (2001), Wingfield's Inferno (2005), and Wingfield: Lost and Found (2009). With the success of the Wingfield Plays, Dan and his wife Heath made their home at Larkspur Farm in Simcoe County in 1988, where he developed his career as a freelancer and playwright.

His popular magazine columns have been published in Harrowsmith-Country Life, Country Guide, Small Farm Canada, In the Hills, On the Bay, Watershed, and other publications.

== Selected works ==
=== Books ===
- "With Axe and Flask, The History of Persephone Township from the Pre-Cambrian Times to the Present", Macfarlane, Walter and Ross (2002)
- "Wingfields World, The Complete Letters from Wingfield Farm", Vintage Canada (2011).
- "True Confessions from the Ninth Concession", Douglas & McIntyre (2017).

=== Plays ===
- Letters From Wingfield Farm(1985)
- Wingfield's Progress (1987)
- Wingfield's Folly (1990)
- Wingfield Unbound (1997)
- Wingfield on Ice (2001)
- Wingfield's Inferno (2005)
- Wingfield: Lost and Found (2009)
- "Perils of Persephone (1989)
- "Last Christmas Turkey" (2005)
- "Ed's Garage (2012)
- "Team on the Hill" (2013)
- "Last Christmas Turkey", a musical adaptation scored by Clive VanderBurgh (2016)

== Awards ==
- With Axe and Flask, The History of Persephone Township from Pre-Cambrian Times to the Present was the winner of the 2003 Stephen Leacock Memorial Medal for Humour.
- On December 26, 2014, Dan Needles was appointed a Member of the Order of Canada by David Johnston, Governor General of Canada, for "celebrating our rural communities as the playwright of the much-loved Wingfield Farm series, and for championing the dramatic arts outside of Canada’s major centres."

== See also ==
- Dan Needles homepage
- Walt Wingfield homepage
- Needles' profile
- Needles' profile at mycollingwood.ca
- Stephen Leacock Medal homepage
