= Blood Relations (Pollock play) =

Play by Sharon Pollock

Blood Relations is a psychological murder mystery written by Sharon Pollock. The play is based on historical fact and speculation surrounding the life of Lizzie Borden and the murders of her father and stepmother, crimes with which Borden was arrested for, though acquitted from and found not guilty.

== Characters ==
- Abigail Borden, the step-mother of Lizzie.
- Andrew Borden, Lizzie's father, owner of the property.
- Dr. Patrick, Lizzie's closest ally in the play, also the town doctor.
- Emma Borden, older sister.
- Harry Wingate, Lizzie's step-uncle and the catalyst for her decision to murder her parents. He arrives at the Borden home to convince Lizzie's father to sign away ownership of the family farm to his wife, Harry's sister. This means that Lizzie's hold on the estate is in danger.
- Lizzie Borden, the play's central character.
- The Actress, a friend of Lizzie's and, by all appearances, her lesbian lover.
- Bridget O'Sullivan, the Borden Household Irish maid, Lizzie's friend

== Historical context ==
The play is based on the case of Lizzie Borden. On August 4, 1892, Borden's father's body was "discovered" by Lizzie in a downstairs room of the family home. Soon, the Bordens' maid, Sullivan, discovered the body of Borden's stepmother. The subsequent investigation and trial of Lizzie set a precedent for media coverage.

On the morning of August 4, 1892, Lizzie reported to Bridget O'Sullivan, the Irish maid, her discovery of the bloody body of her father sprawled on the sofa in the sitting room, and instructed her to fetch the family physician, Dr. Bowen. When the doctor and the police arrived, they also found the body of Abby Borden upstairs, her head similarly crushed by multiple axe blows. Bridget Sullivan testified that she had been in her own attic room, resting from cleaning windows on a very hot day. She had neither heard nor seen anything unusual. Lizzie claimed that she had been in the barn, although the undisturbed dust on the barn floor seemed to indicate otherwise. Emma was out of town visiting friends. Four axes were discovered in the basement, one without a handle, and the head covered in ashes. No evidence of blood was found on Lizzie's clothes, although her friend, Miss Russell, did discover her burning a dress three days later, which she claimed had been stained with paint. At the inquest, it was also revealed that Lizzie had bought prussic acid from a local pharmacy the day before, and that Abby and Andrew Borden had been ill that morning. Lizzie was arrested for murder and the trial date set for June 5, 1893. The trial lasted fourteen days, and caused a national sensation: it was the first public trial in the United States to be covered extensively by the media. Popular opinion was split on the innocence or guilt of Lizzie Borden, with strong support coming from feminists and animal rights advocates.

Lizzie Borden was acquitted—her lawyers having persuaded the jury that the evidence was circumstantial. She continued to live in Fall River in a fashionable Victorian mansion located on "The Hill" with her sister. However, she continued a life of social circumscription, even more limited than before the murders, since she was understandably shunned by the community. She did travel regularly, however, maintaining a relationship with a young Boston actress named Nance O'Neil, which provoked yet more rumours, and resulting in Emma finding her own place to live. She died in 1927 and was buried in the Borden family plot.

== Production history ==
The play premiered professionally at Theatre 3, Edmonton, Alberta, March 12, 1980, directed by Keith Digby, with set by J. Fraser Hiltz, costumes by Kathryn Burns and lighting by Luciano Iogna, featuring Janet Daverne as Miss Lizzie, Judith Mabey as the Actress, Barbara Reese as Emma, Wendell Smith as Dr. Patrick/Defence, Brian Atkins as Harry, Paddy English as Mrs. Borden and Charles Kerr as Mr. Borden. Coastline Theatre, under the direction of Julie Antonick, performed the play in 1985 and was its entry in that year's Nova Scotia Drama League Theatre Festival. In 2010 it was performed by the Dramatic Arts Department at Brock University in St. Catharines, Ontario, Canada. It was also performed in 2011 by the Drama Department of Grande Prairie Regional College, directed by Annie Smith. In December 2010 play had its opening at the National Theatre of Kosovo. Same year it was also published in Albanian, in an edition published by the National Theatre of Kosovo. Blood Relations had its UK premiere in the Corpus Playroom at Cambridge University, directed by Lily Isaacs and Tasmin Jones.

== Awards ==
The published version of Blood Relations won the Canadian Governor General's Award in 1981.

== Reception and interpretation ==
In discussing the difference between Blood Relations and her earlier work, Pollock said "people who don't like social comment plays seem to think I've 'moved' considerably and I'm finally beginning to concentrate on character, that I've learned a few character traits and maybe they can expect some 'better' work from me."

Ann Saddlemyer identifies a clear feminist message in Blood Relations, stating that "In many ways the play epitomizes the strengths and originality of theatre about women imprisoned in a man-ordered universe." says in Rough Justice: Essays on Crime in Literature.

Mary Pat Mombourquette notes in the International Encyclopedia of Theatre that Pollock does not permit passivity in the audience, "...instead she demands that the audience acknowledge that the act of judging makes them active participants in the theatrical event."
