= Norm Foster (playwright) =

Canadian playwright

- Born: February 14, 1949 (age 77); Newmarket, Ontario, Canada
- Occupations: playwright, actor

Norman Foster, OC (born February 14, 1949) is a Canadian playwright, considered to be Canada's most produced playwright. Foster has frequently been referred to as Canada's version of Neil Simon due to his prolific resume of life situation comedy. Foster discovered his talents as a playwright in Fredericton, New Brunswick, while he was working as host of a popular morning radio show. He accompanied a friend (Peter Spurway) to an audition, and landed his first acting job, as Elwood P. Dowd in Harvey, without ever having even seen a play. Intrigued with the theatre, he set his pen to paper and wrote his first play titled Sinners.

In 1983 and 1984, Theatre New Brunswick mounted the first professional productions of Sinners and Foster's next play The Melville Boys. In the years following, TNB introduced My Darling Judith (1987), The Affections of May (1990), The Motor Trade (1991), Wrong for Each Other (1992), and Office Hours (1996).

An extremely prolific writer, Foster has written more than 75 comedic plays for the stage. Other well-known plays include The Love List, The Long Weekend; Bedtime Stories; Kiss the Moon, Kiss the Sun; Storm Warning; Skin Flick; Outlaw; Hilda's Yard; On A First Name Basis; Old Love; Mending Fences, Here on the Flight Path, The Foursome and The Ladies Foursome. Frequently compared to American playwright Neil Simon, Foster pens plays that are known for their humour, accessibility, and insight into the everyday tribulations of life. Foster's work is frequently produced by theatre groups across North America, and as far away from his home in Canada as Australia. Beginning in June 2016, The Norm Foster Theatre Festival in St. Catharines, Ontario, celebrated the work of this Canadian playwright.

The Playwrights Guild of Canada awarded him lifetime membership in 2016.

In December 2016, Foster was named an Officer of the Order of Canada.

In 2018, he was awarded the key to the city in St. Catharines, Ontario.

He also acts, often in his own work. For example, he appears as Jonas in some productions of Jonas & Barry in the Home, which Foster considers to be his favourite play.

== Works by Norm Foster ==
Year	Title	# of Actors	Precis
1983	Sinners	6 (3F 3M)	Norm Foster's first play and a murder mystery comic farce. Furniture salesman Peter Kramer is caught in a tryst with Monica Lloyd by her reverend husband when he arrives home early from a two-day trip. Peter strikes the reverend with an alarm clock, supposedly killing him and the two attempt to conceal the body. In walks neighbour Dianne Gillis, mistaking Peter for the reverend, who tells him that she believes Monica is also having an affair with her husband too and inadvertently placing Peter at the scene of the crime. The second act introduces Carolyn Cavanaugh, a bossy kleptomaniac whose husband Roy the police chief is more interested in becoming mayor than investigating a murder.
1984	The Melville Boys	4 (2F 2M)	Two brothers, Owen and his terminally ill brother Lee on a weekend outing to a cottage on a lake meet two sisters, Mary and Loretta who live nearby and operate the nearby store.
1986	Windfall	5 (2F 3M)	Sixteen years earlier Walter and Louise won the lottery, bought an estate and never left, spending their days playing various games. An overly inquisitive reporter enters the picture and along with the couple's two children results in the revelation of multiple family secrets.
1987	My Darling Judith	4 (2F 2M)	David Stafford, hoping to replace his wife Judith with a younger woman Anna, schemes to have Judith seduced by his employee Carl.
1989	Opening Night	6 (3F 5M)	A poignant comedy that takes place in the backstage VIP lounge of a community theatre production.
1990	Affections of May	4 (1F 3M)	When May's husband Brian abandons her for another woman and the big city, two potential suitors emerge.
1991	The Motor Trade	4 (2F 2M)	Set in an auto showroom, salesmen Phil and Dan discuss sports, cars, women and life.
1992	Wrong for Each Other	2 (1F 1M)	Four years after their divorce Rudy and Norah accidentally run into each other in a restaurant and recap what went right and what went wrong in their relationship.
1994	Ned Durango comes to Big Oak	5 (2F 3M)	Takes place at the Crossroads Cafe in the soon to become ghost town of Big Oak. The Cafe staff along with town's mayor decide to bring in aging former TV cowboy Ned Durango to head their annual Tomato Parade in the hopes of drawing in tourists and thereby saving the town.
1994	The Long Weekend	4 (2F 2M)	Two unhappily married couples, the wives supposedly best friends, get together and air old grievances in this comedy of manners.
1994	The Sitter	4 (1F 3M)	A couple's plans are upset when they discover that the baby sitter they have hired for the night is also a murderer.
1996	Bravado	5 (1F 4M)	
1996	Office Hours	17 (5F, 12M) Minimum 5 as roles can be doubled	Six vignettes in six nearby offices tied together by a set of McGuffins. In one office a news producer tries to take a report off the air due to his age. Next door a pair of movie producers are preparing to flatter a down-on-his-luck director. Another scene involves a young woman interviewing a private eye to document her husbands infidelities. An entertainment lawyer tries to come out to his parents And an anxious psychiatrist attempts to talk a client down from a ledge while hoping to finish in time to meet her lover for the weekend,
1996	Sadie Flynn comes to Big Oak	5 (3F 2M)	Nothing much happens in the small town of Big Oak until it does when Sadie Flynn who was convicted of murdering her husband comes to town after serving her sentence. The local cafe owner helps her out with accommodation and a job. For her part Sadie is able to help with some of the town's problems.
1997	Here on the Flight Path	4 (3F 1M)	A recently divorced reporter forms relationships with three of his new neighbours and learns about life in the process. Female roles can be played by one person.
1998	Drinking Alone	5 (3F 2M)	A comedy about a dysfunctional family. Ivan Todd, who abandoned his alcoholic wife and is now remarried to Phyllis, visits his estranged son Joe who is living in the old family home. Joe lacks friends and accomplishments so to impress his father he hires first-time escort Renee to pose as his fiancé. Joe's outwardly successful sister Carrie joins the scenario, but like her mother she too has a drinking problem.
1998	Ethan Claymore	6 (1F 5M)	Five years after the passing of his beloved wife Jenny from leukemia and a week before Christmas, struggling egg farmer Ethan is set up for a date with the new local school marm, Theresa by his matchmaking neighbour Doug. Ethan is not very keen on the idea but, shades of Charles Dickens, he is visited by his recently deceased brother Martin who has been tasked by three spirits to help set things right by revisiting their past selves.
1998	The Christmas Tree	2 (1F 1M)	A one act play. Two strangers negotiate over the last Christmas tree on the lot.
1998	The Foursome	4 (4M)	Four very competitive college friends attempt to rekindle their old friendship years later over a game of golf.
1999	Louis and Dave	2 (2M)	A two handed one act play. The titular characters, Louis and Dave, spend their Saturdays cruising in their car and trying to pick up women. While Louis is a simple "jock" he is somewhat dismayed to find that Dave is also an intellectual.
2000	Maggie's getting married	6 (3F 2M)	Kitchen based comedy. Three couples, Maggie's parents, her older sister Wanda, Wanda's current actor boyfriend and the intended groom, Russel, a real estate salesmen. Set at the night before wedding rehearsal. Tensions flare when Wanda recognizes Russel as a recent one night fling.
2000	Small Time	5 (2F 3M)	Marty Birch is a keyboard jazz musician unable to remain steadily employed and his wife Sandra is on the verge of leaving him. A steady gig will save his marriage so he agrees to work for crooner Scott Sherman who owns a bar. But Scott owes a large gambling debt to thug Cookie Tucker who intends to shut the bar down. Meanwhile, Cookie has his own problems as he is secretly sleeping with Angela, the nymphomaniac wife of his mobster boss.
2001	Jasper Station	6 (3F 3M)	A musical comedy in collaboration Steve Thomas. Rebecca Townsend is a local reporter who is writing a follow up human interest story about four strangers she met at the train station five years ago - a hockey player, a woman who left a loveless marriage, an accountant dreaming of becoming a country songwriter and a pregnant woman running away to join a literally spaced out cult.
2001	Kiss the Moon, Kiss the Sun	5 (2F 3F)	A morally challenging comedy in which the aging mother of a mentally challenged son hopes to convince a young woman boarder to take over his care when she is gone.
2002	Dear Santa	8 (3F 5M) + choir, ~7 elves	Final preparations for Christmas at the North Pole and a stressed out Santa has last minute problems to deal with from a highly aggressive rocket powered sleigh salesman, a stowaway child on the supply train with a special request for her younger brother, an underprepared and off-key choir, a high strung office manager. a shop steward prone to malapropisms and a lovelorn housekeeper trying to keep the toyshop going having run out of glue.
2002	Race Day	12 (9F 3M)	Musical comedy bringing the characters together at a racetrack where most are there to bet on the horses, but for different reasons. Music by Steve Thomas.
2002	Self Help	6 (3F 3M)	A married pair of unsuccessful actors scheme to turn their acting skills into becoming phony self help advice experts. But then, with their own failing relationship, the dead naked body of their gardener with an erection in their study that they are trying to get rid of and a nosy reporter on the scene threatens to destroy their successful deception.
2003	Storm Warning	4 (2F 2M)	Taking place in cottage country in 1953, the play follows the growth of a relationship between neighbours Jack, a lonely war veteran and free spirited Emma.
2003	The Death of Me (1 Act)	4 (2F 2M)	The Angel of Death grants a young man another chance at life.
2003	The Love List	3 (1F 2M)	Leon attempts to helps his lonely divorced friend Bill by getting him to join a mysterious dating service. Together they put together a list of ten attributes most desirable in a woman. In the next scene she miraculously appears however perfection is not what it is cracked up to be.
2004	Outlaw	4 (4M)	A murder comedy-mystery set in 1971 Baxter Springs, Kansas in the old west. Bob Hicks, a Canadian who does not believe in guns and is just passing through is picked up for the murder of the brother of a local cattle baron Roland Keets. Hicks is apparently innocent but the tension rests in the strong possibility that he will still hang for the crime.
2005	Looking	6 (2F 2M)	Middle aged Andy posts an ad in the personal section of a newspaper looking for a date. Nina spots the ad and convinces her friend Val to answer it. Andy brings his best friend Matt for support while Val brings Nina. The two friends hit it off while Andy and Val struggle to find common ground.
2005	Sitting Pretty	2 (1F 1M)	Musical comedy. Sam Thorn, a former children's TV star has lost everything and is now trying to find meaning in his life.
2006	Bedtime Stories	15 (6F 9M) By doubling as few as five actors.	Six vignettes taking place in a bedroom. A radio host hopes to increase his audience by broadcasting play-by-play reporting of a middle aged couple engaging in sex but backs out. In another a woman leaving her husband explains what is wrong with men to her two movers. An over the hill rock star is propositioned by a young star. Two thieves staging a break instead start riffing on personal issues. A dying man is visited by a woman he once dated who looks for absolution for her past behaviour.
2006	Mending Fences	3 (1F 2M)	Saskatchewan farmer Harry whose farming enterprise was destroyed by mad cow disease reunites with his son Drew after a 13-year absence. The same actress appears as Harry's girlfriend Gin, and also his mother and ex-wife. A dark comedy touching on human relationships, suicide, alcoholism, adultery and a broken home.
2006	My Narrator (1 Act)	4 (2F 2M)	Two young people start a relationship while listening to their inner voices, and then the inner voices interact with each other and have their own relationship.
2007	Jenny's House of Joy ISBN 978-088754-688-4	5 (5F)	A companion piece and prequel to Foster's "Outlaw" set in a bordelo in the Old West. Jenny, the "madam" agrees to take in Natalie, a former society woman who left her abusive husband, for a two-month trial. Older sex-worker Frances thinks she is not what she seems while younger Natalie who hopes to leave the brothel behind and become respectable seeks to become her friend. And then there is Clara from the town who is furious that her dying husband is a client of Jenny's establishment.
1996	Jupiter in July	6 (2F 1M)	As he tends to his hobby allotment garden Donald Springer has a mid-life crisis, doubting the value of his marriage to Joanne while falling for fellow gardener Heddy Athens who is half his age.
2007	One Moment	4 (2M 2F)	Comedy with music by Steve Thomas.
2008	Bob's Your Elf	6 (2F 4M) + 4 children	Grumpy and disruptive Bob is exiled by Santa to Thithelville to learn to be a better elf. His mission, to help the local amateur thespians put on a Christmas pageant. Includes a sex starved librarian, an actress who mixes up her lines, an incompetent director, an overpowering stage manager, four (not three!) children playing wise men and of course Santa.
2008	Old Love	2 (1F 1M)	Serial divorcé Budd attempts to strike up a relationship with very recently widowed Molly whom he has secretly admired for years.
2009	Skin Flick	5 (2F 3M)	An out of work couple decide to make a porn movie to get themselves out of their financial problems. Loaded with sexual innuendos and references but not graphic beyond a fully clothed grope.
2009	The Last Resort	8 (4F 4M)	A musical murder mystery comedy in collaboration with librettist Leslie Arden. The play features couple celebrating their 24th anniversary, a poet with writer's block, a paranoid FBI informant hiding from the mob and his FBI bodyguard, twin sisters (played by the same actress), one innocent, the other evil, a wonky hotel concierge and a bumbling police inspector.
2009	Under the Bright Sun (1 Act)	4 (2F 2M)	Four characters meet at a bus stop and question their lives and the nature of reality.
2011	Watching Jeopardy (Novel)		
2012	Hilda's Yard	6 (4F 2M)	A nostalgic period piece set in 1956. Empty nesters Hilda and Sam Fluck are visited by their two children, Gary who needs to hide from his bookie and newly married Janey seeking refuge from her abusive husband. Gary also brings along his current girlfriend Bobbi.
2012	Mrs. Parliament's Night Out	7 (3F 4M)	Mr. Parliament forgets their 32nd anniversary. A series of vignettes where Mrs. Parliament rediscovers her identity.
2012	On a First Name Basis	2 (1F 1M)	A successful but self centered writer discovers that he knows nothing about his housekeeper of more than 25 years, but she knows everything about him!
2013	A Snow White Christmas	6 (2F 4M) +8 preteen children	An a musical fractured fairy tale, an older and cynical Snow White whose Prince Charming has jilted her for Cinderella, operates a candy store along with a group of orphans. In order to raise enough money for Christmas dinner she decides to sell off the original tale's magic mirror. Add a pair of dimwitted hapless thieves, a powerless Fairly Good Mother, a substitute suitor Vince Charming and a hoped for happily ever after. A final actor is the talking mirror. Co-authored with composer David Warrack.
2013	The Great Kooshog Lake Hollis McCauley Fishing Derby	5 (3F 2M)	Investment banker James Bell's car breaks down in rural Kooshog Lake, and with nothing else to do he enters the local annual fishing derby and mixes with the locals.
2014	The Gentleman Clothier	4 (2F 2M)	Norman Davenport, an old fashioned tailor with a nostalgia for times past, is days away from opening his own clothing store. Reluctantly he hires Sophie, who lacks experience but has a family history in the trade, and in turn Patrick who also lacks experience but is desperate for a job so that he can afford to look after his sick daughter with an exotic disease. Then in walks a wealthy woman demanding a bespoke suite for her husband. In the second act Norman finds himself in the past, 1894 London, and learns that life back then was not as simple as he imagined.
2014	The Ladies Foursome	4 (4F)	Connie, Margot and Tate engage in a round of golf the day following the funeral their friend Cathy, and are joined by Dory another of her friends whom they know nothing about.
2016	For Life	4 (WF 2M)	A comedy with music and lyrics by Michael Doherty and Tania Breen. Four high school friends discuss their dreams. Paige aspires to become a world champion chef, Lizzi an influential fashion designer, Andy hopes to become either a mechanic or a doctor and Sam, an artist purely for the love of art and not the trappings of success. Years later they meet and take stock of how their dreams have evolved.
2016	Halfway There	5 (4F 1M)	A fictional tale in the real small town of Stewiacke Nova Scotia whose only claim to fame is lying midway between the Equator and the North Pol. 4 women, long time friends meet every week at the local diner to talk about their lives. Enter Sean, a doctor from Toronto, a temporary replacement at the town's clinic who falls for one of the women but she is not sure that she is interested.
2017	Lunenberg	3 (2F 1M)	Iris Oulette's husband dies in a plane crash and unexpectedly inherits a house in Lunenburg, Nova Scotia that she did not know he owned. Along with her best friend Natalie they go to investigate the home where they encounter Charlie, the next door neighbour. Natalie and Charlie quickly strike up a relationship while Iris finds a diary belonging to a stranger which may unravel the secrets of both her late husband and the house.
2017	Screwball Comedy	4 (4F 5M)	A paean to screwball comedies of the 1930s like The Front Page (1931 film) and His Girl Friday. Mary Hayes and star reporter Jeff Kincaid are both sent to cover a fancy society wedding. Whomever submits the better story gets Jeff's position on the paper. Wealthy socialite Delores Diddle believes her son's fiancée is a gold digger and asks the reporters to investigate. But is Delores' own fiancée Peter everything that he seems? Includes Reginald, the Diddles' comic butler.
2018	Come Down from Up River	3 (2F 1M)	Logger Shaver Bennet returns to Saint John New Brunswick for medical tests and decides to stay with his estranged niece Bonnie, unaware that she is now a successful lawyer in a same-sex interracial marriage. Bonnie assumes that her uncle is a bigoted red-neck but Shaver turns out to be far more accepting than she imagined.
2018	Jonas & Barry in the Home	3 (1F 2M)	Two older men meet in a retirement home. Jonas, an outgoing retired actor, is full of life. Barry, a retired and long divorced dentist is withdrawn from the world, and is just settling in., His daughter Rosie who works at the home, is concerned that he might die of a heart attack like his father and brothers, has convinced him that this is the best way for her to keep an eye on him.
2018	Renovations for Six	6 (3F 3M)	Grant and Shayna Perkins are starting a new life new town. They invite two other couples over for cocktails in order two start new friendships, and as it happens all three couples are in the midst of home renovations. Metaphorically all are also in need of renovating their lives and marriages.
2019	Aunt Agnes for Christmas	5 (3F 2M)	When "Aunt" Agnes shows up at the Trimble home just before Christmas no-one is sure exactly how she is related. However the Trimbles have problems and Agnes may have both the wisdom and magical powers to solve them.
2019	Beside Myself	4 (2F 2M)	Musical comedy with music composed by Steve Thomas. Paula and Sam have decided that 35 years of marriage have been a failure. As they are going through their collection of memorabilia Sam picks up a wishing stick that the pair were given at their wedding. Not realizing that it actually works Sam wishes that the two of them had never met. Suddenly they find that they have been transported back in time to when they were in college. They are quite literally beside themselves where, posing as college counsellors they try to convince their younger selves to make different life choices.
2019	The Writer	2 (2M)	An aging writer who once won a Pulitzer hides a deep dark secret from his son.
2021	1812	6 (3F 3M)	Romantic comedy set during the War of 1812 as a political backdrop in the town of St Stephens New Brunswick (Canada) just a bridge over the water from Calais, Maine (USA). One of the main comic twists is that the Mayor of St Stephen has lost his memory due to a fall from his horse.
2022	A Clean Brush	3 (2F 2M)	Murder mystery comedy. The widow Zoe Caldwell's late husband died under suspicious circumstances and hires two housepainters to redo the room where it happened, however her nosy neighbour Lois believes it may have been murder!
2022	A Pack of Thieves	5 (5M)	Jeff and his next door neighbour Robert hatch a plan to steal and ransome a race horse to solve their financial problems. They bring in a seasoned criminal Padre and a pair of dimwitted thugs, "Chip" and "Dale".
2022	Doris and Ivy in the Home	3 (2F 1M)	Three very different characters, Doris a retired corrections officer, Ivy a former skier and Arthur, a retired college academic build a relationship with each other as they settle into a retirement home.
2022	They're Found in the Trees	3 (1F 2M)	Warren and Mitchel get together at the same place every Saturday to watch birds and discuss life. They place an advertisement for others to join them but only one person, Paula, shows up, changing the dynamic between the two friends.
2022	Widow Wonderland	2 (1F 1M)	A one act play. Michael and Sharon, both of whose spouses have passed away, are two lonely hearts paired with each other at their apartment building's Christmas dinner.
2022	Wildly Romantic	4 (2F 2M)	Diane, the manager a small radio station, has just fired her now ex-boyfriend who used to host the morning show for having an affair with the woman who hosted the overnight show. Coincidentally Sonny shows up hoping to get a job. Kate is the practical office manager trying to keep things running. Lastly there is Eugene, the ex-boyfriend's lawyer who is suing Diane for wrongful dismissal.
2023	Danny and Delilah	4 (2F 1M 1?)	A cross-cultural comedy. Gruff 72 year old Danny is convinced by his daughter Sherry, a high school guidance counsellor who lives with him, to board teenage student Delilah as her father has returned to Pakistan.
2023	My Hero	3 (1F 2M)	Jim, a 40 year old English teacher has been living with his mother Corrine, a former lawyer, for the past five years since his divorce has left him broke. His father, a well known hockey player was killed in a car crash 31 years previously in a snow storm on his way home for Jim's ninth birthday. And a student in Jim's class says that if he does not give her an A to get into university she will accuse him of sexual harassment. Corrine is supportive of her son, but is interested in her landscaper Randy who is also a widower. Randy is sweet, quotes Shakespeare, and is devoted to his daughter Olivia, an epileptic who lives in an assisted living facility.
2023	Ship to Shore	2 (1F 1M)	Two strangers meet on an ocean voyage to Ireland.
2023	Whit's End	4 (2F 2M)	Whit, a 61 year old, has been living with Nicki, a divorced financial advisor for some time and the two are planning to retire from Calgary Alberta to Kelowna British Columbia. Whit though has never told his children Erica and Steven about the relationship. When he summons them to visit for an important announcement they assume that he is dying.
2024	Lakefront	3 (1F 2M)	Retired seniors Robert and Christina, who only met each other recently at a wedding, rent a cabin to explore if they are ready for a relationship but are frequently interrupted by naive and much younger Duane who is temporarily looking after the property while his parents are away.
2024	Those Movies	4 (2F 2M)	Harry is infatuated with Millie, the both work as attendants at the same parking lot, and asks her out on a date. Millie brings her accident prone cousin Chelsea and Harry brings his out of work friend Patrick. Harry hopes that everything will work out just like in the movies.
2025	A Woman's Love List	3 (2F 1M)	Thirty something Megan, and her best friend Carly find Carly "the perfect man" through a bespoke dating service which asks for a list of the ten most desirable qualities in a man. When "Blaze" shows up the next he is not only too perfect, when they make changes in the list, Blaze changes as well. But is the fantasy real?
2025	Bridge Narrows		.
2025	I'm in Love With Your Sister	3 (2F 1M)	Kevin arrives home to (apparently) discovers that his girlfriend Louise has been sleeping with another man and she starts packing to leave, but Louise's sister Patsy intervenes as she does not want Louise to move in with her.
2025	The Stakeout	2 (1F 1M)	Two undercover police officers pretend to be a married couple as they watch a house where drug deals are supposedly going down.

Complete list of the works of Norm Foster.
