= Joanna Glass =

Canadian playwright (born 1936)

- Born: Joan Ruth McClelland; October 7, 1936 (age 89); Saskatoon, Saskatchewan, Canada
- Citizenship: United States of America
- Notable work: Artichoke (1975); Woman Wanted (1984); Trying (2004)
- Spouse: Alexander Glass (married 1959–1976)
- Children: 3

Joanna McClelland Glass (born October 7, 1936) is a Canadian playwright. She was born in Saskatoon, Saskatchewan, and became an American citizen in 1962. She has aided in the expansion of Canadian Theatre from 1970 to the present.

== Life ==
Glass was born on October 7, 1936, in Saskatoon, Saskatchewan, Canada. She was born as Joan Ruth McClelland. She was involved with theatre during high school. She moved to Calgary to work in a radio station.

== Plays ==
- Canadian Gothic (1972)
- American Modern (1972)
- Artichoke (1975)
- To Grandmother's House We Go (1980)
- Play Memory (1983)
- Yesteryear (1989)
- If We Are Women (1993)
- Trying (2004)
- Palmer Park (2008)
- Mrs. Dexter and Her Daily (2010)

== Novels ==
- Reflections on a Mountain Summer (Knopf, 1975)
- Woman Wanted (St. Martin's, 1984)

== See also ==
- Woman Wanted, film adapted from novel.
