= Maureen Hunter =

Canadian playwright (born 1948)

Maureen Hunter (born 1948) is a Canadian playwright who lives on the Salish Sea at Sechelt, BC. Hunter was born in Indian Head, Saskatchewan and graduated from the University of Saskatchewan. Throughout her professional career, she lived in Winnipeg, Manitoba. Most of her plays were premiered by the Royal Manitoba Theatre Company. They have been performed in theatres across Canada, as well as in the U.S. and Britain. Transit of Venus was performed by the Royal Shakespeare Company and recorded by the BBC. An opera version of Transit of Venus premiered at Manitoba Opera in 2007. Her plays have been published by Scirocco Drama and Nuage Editions and are available through good bookstores and on Amazon. She is a member of the Playwrights Guild of Canada.

== Works ==
- Poor Uncle Ernie in his Covered Cage - 1986
- I Met a Bully on the Hill - co-author 1986
- The Queen of Queen Street - 1987
- Footprints on the Moon - 1988 (nominated for a Governor General's Award)
- Beautiful Lake Winnipeg - 1990
- Transit of Venus - 1992
- Atlantis - 1996 (nominated for a Governor General's Award)
- Vinci - 2002
- Wild Mouth - 2008

. Sarah Ballenden - 2017

== See also ==
- List of Canadian playwrights
