= The Black Bonspiel of Wullie MacCrimmon =

1951 stage play by W. O. Mitchell

The Black Bonspiel of Wullie Maccrimmon is a play by Canadian author W. O. Mitchell. It was written as a radio play in 1951, but later produced for television by the Canadian Broadcasting Corporation in 1965. It has since been widely produced across Canada at Alberta Theatre Projects, the Manitoba Theatre Centre, Regina's Globe Theatre, and the Vancouver Playhouse among others.

The plot is inspired to some degree by the tale of Faust, but set in the context of Alberta in the first half of the twentieth century. The title character is a shoemaker and part-time recreational curler who is approached by the Devil with an offer. MacCrimmon initially accepts, but is persuaded to renegotiate, the result of which is the title contest: his team, composed of himself and three close friends, against the Devil's rink, including Macbeth, Judas Iscariot and Guy Fawkes.

Several manuscript and published versions of the story in various formats (e.g. novel, short story, radio play, stage play, film/television) are held in the University of Calgary's Archives & Collections’ W.O. Mitchell fonds but none appear to have been digitized.
