= Citadel Theatre production history =

The Citadel Theatre is the major theatre-arts venue in Edmonton, the capital city of Alberta, Canada. This is a chronological list of the productions staged there since its opening night on November 10, 1965.

== 1965–1966 ==
- Who's Afraid of Virginia Woolf? – by Edward Albee
- Under the Yum-Yum Tree – by Lawrence Roman
- Bell, Book and Candle – by John Van Druten
- Come Back, Little Sheba – by William Inge
- Never Too Late – by S. A. Long
- Death of a Salesman – by Arthur Miller
- Come Blow Your Horn – by Neil Simon
- The Glass Menagerie – by Tennessee Williams

== 1966–1967 ==
- The Pleasure of His Company – by Cornelia Otis Skinner and Samuel A. Taylor
- The Threepenny Opera – by Bertolt Brecht and Kurt Weill
- All The Crazy Things That Crazy People Do – by Robert Glenn and Raymond Allen
- The Little Hut – by André Roussin
- Candida – by George Bernard Shaw
- The Subject Was Roses – by Frank D. Gilroy
- Luv – by Murray Schisgal

== 1967–1968 ==
- Barefoot in the Park – by Neil Simon
- Hedda Gabler – by Henrik Ibsen
- A Funny Thing Happened on the Way to the Forum – music and lyrics by Stephen Sondheim, book by Burt Shevelove and Larry Gelbart
- Tiny Alice – by Edward Albee
- The Owl and the Pussycat – by Bill Manhoff
- Hamp – by John Wilson
- Private Lives – by Noël Coward

== 1968–1969 ==
- The Odd Couple – by Neil Simon
- Philadelphia Here I Come! – by Brian Friel
- Irma La Douce – music by Marguerite Monnot, lyrics and book by Alexandre Breffort
- The Right Honourable Gentleman – by Michael Dyne
- Village Wooing / Dark Lady of the Sonnets – by George Bernard Shaw
- In White America – by Martin Duberman
- Star Spangled Girl – by Neil Simon

== 1969–1970 ==
- There's A Girl In My Soup – by Terence Frisby
- The Rehearsal – by Jean Anouilh
- The Fantasticks – music by Harvey Schmidt, lyrics by Tom Jones
- The Shadow of a Gunman – by Seán O'Casey
- The Price – by Arthur Miller
- Lovers – by Brian Friel
- Seidman & Son – by Elick Moll

== 1970–1971 ==
- The Importance of Being Earnest – by Oscar Wilde
- Staircase – by Charles Dyer
- The Secretary Bird – by William Douglas-Home
- Plaza Suite – by Neil Simon
- Othello – by William Shakespeare
- Counsellor Extraordinary – by Stewart Boston
- Lullaby – by Don Appell

== 1971–1972 ==
- Blithe Spirit – by Noël Coward
- The Quare Fellow – by Brendan Behan
- Don't Listen Ladies! – by Guy Bolton and P G Wodehouse (adapted from a play by Sacha Guitry)
- Of Mice and Men – by John Steinbeck
- The Affairs of Anatol – by Arthur Schnitzler
- An Enemy of the People – by Henrik Ibsen
- Yesterday the Children were Dancing – by Gratien Gélinas

== 1972–1973 ==
- Last of the Red Hot Lovers – by Neil Simon
- The V.P. – by Alexander McAllister
- You're a Good Man, Charlie Brown – music and lyrics by Clark Gesner, book by John Gordon
- The Unreasonable Act of Julian Waterman – by Ron Taylor
- The Tempest – by William Shakespeare
- Jacques Brel Is Alive and Well and Living in Paris – by Jacques Brel
- Relatively Speaking – by Alan Ayckbourn

== 1973–1974 ==
- Much Ado About Nothing – by William Shakespeare
- The Caretaker – by Harold Pinter
- I Do! I Do! – book and lyrics by Tom Jones, music by Harvey Schmidt
- Childs Play – by Robert Marasco
- How the Other Half Loves – by Alan Ayckbourn
- That Championship Season – by Jason Miller
- Oedipus Rex / Scapini (double bill) – by Sophocles and Molière

== 1974–1975 ==
- The Rivals – by Richard Brinsley Sheridan
- 6 RMS RIV VU – by Bob Randall
- Anything Goes – by Cole Porter
- The Au Pair Man – by Hugh Leonard
- Uncle Vanya – by Anton Chekhov
- Forever Yours, Marie-Lou – by Michel Tremblay
- The Alchemist – by Ben Jonson
- Babel Rap – by John Lazarus Scott
- The Extermination of Jesus Christ – by George Bernard Shaw
- Battering Ram – by David Freeman

== 1975–1976 ==
- Sherlock Holmes – by Arthur Conan Doyle
- Dear Liar – by Jerome Kilty
- Joseph and the Amazing Technicolor Dreamcoat – by Andrew Lloyd Webber and Tim Rice
- The Sunshine Boys – by Neil Simon
- Mrs. Warren's Profession – by George Bernard Shaw
- Absurd Person Singular – by Alan Ayckbourn
- A Compulsory Option – by Sharon Pollock
- Hosanna – by Michel Tremblay
- Endgame – by Samuel Beckett
- You're Gonna be Alright, Jamie Boy – by David Freeman
- Olympiad – by Patrick Rose and Richard Ouzounian

== 1976–1977 ==
- Romeo and Juliet – by William Shakespeare
- Equus – by Peter Shaffer
- Oh, Coward! – by Noël Coward
- Schweik in the Second World War – by Bertolt Brecht
- Bethune – by Rod Langley
- Same Time, Next Year – by Bernard Slade
- The Master Builder – by Henrik Ibsen
- Crabdance – by Beverley Simons
- The Komagata Maru Incident – by Sharon Pollock

== 1977–1978 ==
- Happy Days – by Samuel Beckett
- Bedroom Farce – by Alan Ayckbourn
- Pygmalion – by George Bernard Shaw
- Twelfth Night – by William Shakespeare
- The Night of the Iguana – by Tennessee Williams
- Dames at Sea – book and lyrics by George Haimsohn and Robin Miller, music by Jim Wise
- Antigone – by Jean Anouilh
- Boiler Room Suite – by Rex Deverell
- Passengers – by Paddy Campbell, music by William Skolnik
- Ashes – by David Rudkin
- The Lover – by Harold Pinter
- The Stronger – by August Strindberg
- Solange – by Jean Barbeau
- Treasure Island – by Robert Louis Stevenson

== 1978–1979 ==
- Harold and Maude – by Colin Higgins
- Richard III – by William Shakespeare
- Flowers for Algernon – by Daniel Keyes
- Cause Célèbre – by Terence Rattigan
- Charley's Aunt – by Brandon Thomas
- Ecstasy of Rita Joe – by George Ryga
- Moby Dick - Rehearsed – by Orson Welles
- Rashomon – by Fay Kanin and Michael Kanin
- API 2967 – by Robert Gurik
- The Chairs and the New Tenant – by Eugène Ionesco
- A Bistro Car on the CNR – by Richard Ouzounian
- Storytheatre – by Peter Coe
- Songs and Stories of A. A. Milne – by A. A. Milne

== 1979–1980 ==
- Hamlet – by William Shakespeare
- Brief Lives – by Patrick Garland
- The Trials of Oscar Wilde – by Peter Coe
- Hey Marilyn – by Cliff Jones
- One Tiger to a Hill – by Sharon Pollock
- Arms and the Man – by George Bernard Shaw
- Mister Lincoln – by Herbert Mitgang
- A Sleep of Prisoners – by Christopher Fry
- The Trojan Women – by Euripides
- Billy Bishop Goes to War – by John Gray and Eric Peterson
- Macbeth – by William Shakespeare
- Christmas in the Market Place – by Henri Ghéon
- Pinocchio – by Brian Way

== 1980–1981 ==
- A Life – by Hugh Leonard
- Ballerina – by Arne Skouen
- A Flea in Her Ear – by Georges Feydeau
- Whose Life Is It Anyway? – by Brian Clark
- The Miser – by Molière
- Grease – by Jim Jacobs and Warren Casey
- Groucho at Large – by Alex Baron
- Love in the Back Seat – by Cliff Jones
- Servant of Two Masters – by Carlo Goldoni
- A Day in the Death of Joe Egg – by Peter Nichols
- The Hollow Crown – by John Barton
- The Ant and the Grasshopper – by Rob Dearborn
- Sleeping Beauty – by James Iwasuk
- The Red Shoes – by Robin Short

== 1981–1982 ==
- Catholics – by Brian Moore
- The Kite – by W. O. Mitchell
- The Boy Friend – by Sandy Wilson
- The Comedy of Errors – by William Shakespeare
- The Elephant Man – by Bernard Pomerance
- 56 Duncan Terrace – by Keith Baxter
- Talley's Folly – by Lanford Wilson
- Tom Foolery – by Tom Lehrer
- Inadmissible Evidence – by John Osborne
- The Lion in Winter – by James Goldman
- Nurse Jane Goes to Hawaii – by Allan Stratton
- The Hobbit – by J. R. R. Tolkien
- Cinderella – by James de Felice

== 1982–1983 ==
- The Dresser – by Ronald Harwood
- The Black Bonspiel of Wullie MacCrimmon – by W. O. Mitchell
- The Three Musketeers – by Alexandre Dumas
- Murder Game – by Dan Ross
- Crimes of the Heart – by Beth Henley
- Guys and Dolls – music and lyrics by Frank Loesser, book by Jo Swerling and Abe Burrows
- The Gin Game – by D. L. Coburn
- Entertaining Mr Sloane – by Joe Orton
- Henry IV, Part 1 – by William Shakespeare
- Emlyn Williams as Charles Dickens – by Emlyn Williams
- Invitation from the Asylum – by Roger O. Hirson
- Rapunzel and the Witch – by Jack A. Melanos
- Androcles and the Lion – by Aurand Harris

== 1983–1984 ==
- The Lark – by Jean Anouilh
- Educating Rita – by Willy Russell
- King Lear – by William Shakespeare
- Death of a Salesman – by Arthur Miller
- Amadeus – by Peter Shaffer
- Duddy – by Mordecai Richler, music by Jerry Leiber and Mike Stoller
- How I Got That Story – by Amlin Gray
- The Fox – by Allan Miller
- Talking Dirty – by Sherman Snukal
- Gale Garnett and Company – by Gale Garnett
- Nuts – by Tom Topor
- A Circus Adventure – by James Ambrose Brown
- Beauty and the Beast – by Warren Graves

== 1984–1985 ==
- Country Holiday – by Carlo Goldino
- Peter Pan – by J. M. Barrie
- The Real Thing – by Tom Stoppard
- Mephisto – by Klaus Mann and Ariane Mnouchkine
- Long Day's Journey into Night – by Eugene O'Neill
- Noises Off – by Michael Frayn
- Nineteen Eighty-Four – by George Orwell
- Glengarry Glen Ross – by David Mamet
- Exposures – by William Chadwick
- "Master Harold"...and the Boys – by Athol Fugard
- Clay – by Peter Whelan
- The Glass Menagerie – by Tennessee Williams
- The Promise – by Aleksei Arbuzov
- The Mystery of the Oak Island Treasure – by Jim Betts

== 1985–1986 ==
- Quiet in the Land – by Anne Chislett
- Pieces of Eight – book by Michael Stewart and Mark Bramble, lyrics by Susan Birkenhead, music by Jule Styne
- The Tempest – by William Shakespeare
- Trafford Tanzi – by Claire Luckham
- Top Girls – by Caryl Churchill
- Private Lives – by Noël Coward
- Master Class – by David Pownall
- Salt-Water Moon – by David French
- Ain't Misbehavin' – book by Murray Horwitz and Richard Maltby, Jr., music by Fats Waller
- Fool for Love – by Sam Shepard
- Getting the Nerve – by Becker/Clinton
- Winnie-the-Pooh – by A. A. Milne
- She Stoops to Conquer – by Oliver Goldsmith
- Last Voyage of the Devil's Wheel – by Jim Betts
- Doors – by Susan Zeder

== 1986–1987 ==
- Brighton Beach Memoirs – by Neil Simon
- Traveller in the Dark – by Marsha Norman
- Pride and Prejudice – by Jane Austen
- Tsymbaly – by Ted Galay
- The Return of Herbert Bracewell – by Andrew Johns
- Jerry's Girls – by Jerry Herman
- The Double Bass – by Patrick Süskind
- Asinamali – by Mbongeni Ngema
- Fire – by Paul Ledoux and David Young
- Pericles – by William Shakespeare
- The Lord of the Rings – by J. R. R. Tolkien
- The Wizard of Oz – by L. Frank Baum
- The Treehouse at the Edge of the World – by Jim Betts
- School Season – by Oliver Goldsmith
- The Legend of Sleepy Hollow – by Washington Irving
- The Wind in the Willows – by Kenneth Grahame

== 1987–1988 ==
- Hadrian the Seventh – by Peter Luke
- Another Season's Promise – by Anne Chislett and Keith Roulston
- Biloxi Blues – by Neil Simon
- Loot – by Joe Orton
- Back to Beulah – by W. O. Mitchell
- Broadway Bound – by Neil Simon
- Orphans – Lyle Kessler
- The Perfect Party – by A. R. Gurney
- Nunsense – by Dan Goggin
- The Road to Mecca – by Athol Fugard
- Annie – music by Charles Strouse, lyrics by Martin Charnin, book by Thomas Meehan
- A Christmas Carol – by Charles Dickens
- The Prisoner of Zenda – by Warren Graves
- Two Pails of Water – by Aad Greidanus
- The Prime of Miss Jean Brodie – by J. P. Allen
- The Revenge of the Space Pandas – by David Mamet

== 1988–1989 ==
- Dracula – by Hamilton Deane
- Major Barbara – by George Bernard Shaw
- Three Men on a Horse – by John Cecil Holm and George Abbott
- Cecil and Cleopaytra – by Daniel Libman
- Nothing Sacred – by George F. Walker
- Ma Rainey's Black Bottom – by August Wilson
- Burn This – by Lanford Wilson
- Kiss of the Spider Woman – by Manuel Puig
- Talk Radio – by Eric Bogosian
- Angry Housewives – music and lyrics by Chad Henry, book by A. M. Collins
- Great Expectations – by Charles Dickens
- Aladdin – by Norman Robbins
- The Lion, the Witch and the Wardrobe – by C. S. Lewis

== 1989–1990 ==
- A Midsummer Night's Dream – by William Shakespeare
- The Crucible – by Arthur Miller
- Driving Miss Daisy – by Alfred Uhry
- A Walk in the Woods – by Lee Blessing
- Breaking the Code – by Hugh Whitemore
- The Philadelphia Story – by Philip Barry
- The Invention of Poetry – by Paul Quarrington
- Speed-the-Plow – by David Mamet
- Frankie and Johnny in the Clair de Lune – by Terrence McNally
- Kafka's Dick – by Alan Bennett
- Julius Caesar – by William Shakespeare
- The Miracle Worker – by William Gibson
- Bedtimes and Bullies – by Dennis Foon
- Jacob Two-Two and the Dinosaur – by Mordecai Richler

== 1990–1991 ==
- Love and Anger – by George F. Walker
- The Heidi Chronicles – by Wendy Wasserstein
- The Fantasticks – music by Harvey Schmidt, lyrics by Tom Jones
- The Cocktail Hour – by A. R. Gurney
- Never the Sinner – by John Logan
- The Mousetrap – by Agatha Christie
- Amigo's Blue Guitar – by Joan MacLeod
- The Two-Headed Roommate – by Bruce McCulloch
- My Children! My Africa! – by Athol Fugard
- The Passion of Narcisse Mondoux – by Gratien Gélinas
- Robinson and Crusoe – by Nino d'Introna and Giacomo Ravicchio
- One Thousand Cranes – by Colin Thomas
- David and Lisa – by James Reach
- Alice's Adventures in Wonderland – by Lewis Carroll

== 1991–1992 ==
- Aspects of Love – book and music by Andrew Lloyd Webber, lyrics by Don Black and Charles Hart
- The Good Doctor – by Neil Simon
- The Affections of May – by Norm Foster
- Lend Me a Tenor – by Ken Ludwig
- Fallen Angels – by Noël Coward
- Oedipus / Black Comedy (double bill) – by Sophocles and Peter Shaffer
- Democracy – by John Murrell
- Tete-a-Tete – by Ralph Burdman
- Warriors – by Michel Garneau
- Letter from Wingfield Farm – by Dan Needles
- Romeo and Juliet – by William Shakespeare
- Head a Tete – by David Craig and Robert Morgan
- Robin Hood – by David Wood, Dave Arthur and Toni Arthur
- Blueprints from Space – by Mark Leiren-Young
- Three Men in a Boat – by Blake Heathcote

== 1992–1993 ==
- The Royal Hunt of the Sun – by Peter Shaffer
- Waiting for the Parade – by John Murrell
- Man of La Mancha – book by Dale Wasserman, lyrics by Joe Darion, music by Mitch Leigh
- La Bête – by David Hirson
- The Two of Us – by Michael Frayn
- She Stoops to Conquer – by Oliver Goldsmith
- Hamlet – by William Shakespeare
- As You Like It – by William Shakespeare
- Invisible Friends – by Alan Ayckbourn
- The Diary of Anne Frank – by Frances Goodrich and Albert Hackett
- Alice and Emily – by Eileen Whitfield
- Shirley Valentine – by Willy Russell
- Hosanna – by Michel Tremblay
- Duet for One – by Tom Kempinski

== 1993–1994 ==
- Saint Joan – by George Bernard Shaw
- Wait Until Dark – by Frederick Knott
- Oliver! – by Lionel Bart
- Cyrano de Bergerac – by Edmond Rostand
- Oleanna – by David Mamet
- Hay Fever – by Noël Coward
- Our Town – by Thornton Wilder
- Macbeth – by William Shakespeare
- Rice Season – by Alan Ayckbourn
- Love Letters – by A. R. Gurney
- A Stranger to my Paris – by Katherine Beaumont
- Life after Latex – by Gale Garnett
- Someone Who'll Watch Over Me – by Frank McGuinness

== 1994–1995 ==
- Caesar and Cleopatra – by George Bernard Shaw
- The Lay of the Land – by Mel Shapiro
- The Music Man – by Meredith Willson
- The Cherry Orchard – by Anton Chekhov, translation by John Murrell
- The Beggar's Opera – by John Gay
- A Man for All Seasons – by Robert Bolt
- Richard III – by William Shakespeare
- Oh, What a Lovely War! – by Joan Littlewood

== 1995–1996 ==
- Breaking Legs – by Tom Dulack
- Later Life – by A. R. Gurney
- A Fitting Confusion – by Georges Feydeau
- Rough Justice – by Terence Frisby
- Fiddler on the Roof – music by Jerry Bock, lyrics by Sheldon Harnick, book by Joseph Stein
- Da – by Hugh Leonard
- Three Tall Women – by Edward Albee
- The River Princess and the Frozen Town – by Stewart Lemoine

== 1996–1997 ==
- Ghosts – by Henrik Ibsen
- Travels with My Aunt – by Graham Greene
- Angels in America, Part Two: Perestroika – by Tony Kushner
- My Fair Lady – book and lyrics by Alan Jay Lerner, music by Frederick Loewe
- South of China – by Raymond Storey
- The Taming of the Shrew – by William Shakespeare
- An Ideal Husband – by Oscar Wilde
- Rice Theatre – by Edward Albee
- Wingfield's Folly – by Dan Needles
- Mata Hari – by Blake Brooker
- Primadonna's First Farewell Tour – by Mary Lou Fallis
- The Piano Man's Daughter – by Timothy Findley
- Songs of Me and Other Little White Lies – by Sheri Somerville
- The River Princess and the Frozen Town – by Stewart Lemoine

== 1997–1998 ==
- Suddenly, Last Summer – by Tennessee Williams
- Ninguls – by Soh Kuramoto
- Othello – by William Shakespeare
- Hello, Dolly! – lyrics and music by Jerry Herman, book by Michael Stewart
- A Delicate Balance – by Edward Albee
- Mrs. Warren's Profession – by George Bernard Shaw
- Master Class – by Terrence McNally
- Lady, Be Good – written by Guy Bolton, Fred Thompson, music by George Gershwin and Ira Gershwin

== 1998–1999 ==
- Of Mice and Men – by John Steinbeck
- How I Learned to Drive – by Paula Vogel
- The Great Wingfield Adventure – by Dan Needles
- The King and I – by Richard Rodgers and Oscar Hammerstein II
- Tartuffe – by Molière
- Skylight – by David Hare
- Twelfth Night – by William Shakespeare
- The Importance of Being Earnest – by Oscar Wilde
- Babes in Arms – by Richard Rodgers and Lorenz Hart
- Wealth – by Aristophanes

== 1999–2000 ==
- Picasso at the Lapin Agile – by Steve Martin
- Popcorn – by Ben Elton
- Into the Woods – by Stephen Sondheim and James Lepine
- The Aberhart Summer – by Conni Massing
- A Streetcar Named Desire – by Tennessee Williams
- Little Shop of Horrors – by Howard Ashman and Alan Menken
- A Midsummer Night's Dream – by William Shakespeare
- 2 Pianos, 4 Hands – by Ted Dykstra and Richard Greenblatt

== 2000–2001 ==
- To Kill A Mockingbird – by Harper Lee and Christopher Sergel
- Wit's End – by Sandra Shamus
- Betty's Summer Vacation – by Christopher Durang
- A Christmas Carol – by Charles Dickens
- The Number 14 – by Melody Anderson
- Wit – by Margaret Edson
- Beatrice – by Chancey James Rolfe and George Elliott Clarke
- Camelot – by Alan Lerner and Frederick Loewe
- Romeo and Juliet – by William Shakespeare
- 'Art' – by Yasmina Reza

== 2001–2002 ==
- Cabaret – book by Joe Masteroff, lyrics by Fred Ebb, music by John Kander
- An Enemy of the People – by Henrik Ibsen
- The Beauty Queen of Leenane – by Martin McDonagh
- A Christmas Carol – by Charles Dickens
- Present Laughter – by Noël Coward
- Doing Leonard Cohen – by Blake Brooker
- Hamlet – by William Shakespeare
- The Drawer Boy – by Michael Healey
- Who Has Seen the Wind? – by W. O. Mitchell, adapted by Lee MacDougall

== 2002–2003 ==
- Servant of Two Masters – by Carlo Goldoni
- The Actor's Nightmare – by Christopher Durang
- Proof – by David Auburn
- A Christmas Carol – by Charles Dickens
- If We Are Women – by Joanna McClelland Glass
- Einstein's Gift – by Vern Thiessen
- Homeward Bound – by Elliott Hayes
- Grease – by Jim Jacobs and Warren Casey
- Paperbag Princesses' Favourite Stories – by Kim McCaw
- The Sword in the Stone – by Marty Chan

== 2003–2004 ==
- Arms and the Man – by George Bernard Shaw
- Amadeus – by Peter Shaffer
- A Christmas Carol – by Charles Dickens
- Stones in His Pockets – by Marie Jones
- Measure for Measure – by William Shakespeare
- Wingfield on Ice – by Dan Needles
- The Sound of Music – by Richard Rodgers and Oscar Hammerstein II
- The Shape of Things – by Neil LaBute
- Blue/Orange – by Joe Penhall
- The Syringa Tree – by Pamela Gien
- Love You Forever – by Robert Munsch
- New Canadian Kid – by Dennis Foon
- Where The Wild Things Are – by Maurice Sendak

== 2004–2005 ==
- Cat on a Hot Tin Roof – by Tennessee Williams
- Shirley Valentine – by Willy Russell
- A Christmas Carol – by Charles Dickens
- West Side Story – book by Arthur Laurents, music by Leonard Bernstein, lyrics by Stephen Sondheim
- Metamorphoses – by Mary Zimmerman
- Uncle Vanya – by Anton Chekhov
- Humble Boy – by Charlotte Jones
- The Goat, or Who is Sylvia? – by Edward Albee
- Shakespeare's Will – by Vern Thiessen
- The Mystery of Irma Vep – by Charles Ludlam
- A Giraffe in Paris – by Mark Haroun
- Munch a Bunch of Munsch – by Kim McCaw

== 2005–2006 ==
- Blithe Spirit – by Noël Coward
- Cookin' at the Cookery – by Marion J. Caffey
- A Christmas Carol – by Charles Dickens
- I Am My Own Wife – by Doug Wright
- Guys and Dolls – music and lyrics by Frank Loesser, book by Jo Swerling and Abe Burrows
- Trying – by Joanna Glass
- Peter Pan – by Tom Wood adapted from the novel by J. M. Barrie
- Frozen – by Bryony Lavery
- Fully Committed – by Becky Mode
- Bigger than Jesus – by Rick Miller and Daniel Brooks
- A Year With Frog and Toad – by Arnold Lobel
- A Prairie Boy's Winter – by William Kurelek
- The Man Whose Mother Was a Pirate – by Margaret Mahy

== 2006–2007 ==
- Equus – by Peter Shaffer
- Three Mo' Divas – by Marion J. Caffey
- A Christmas Carol – by Charles Dickens
- Wingfield's Inferno – by Dan Needles
- The Constant Wife – by Somerset Maugham
- The Overcoat – by Morris Panych and Wendy Gorling
- Oliver! – by Lionel Bart
- The Pillowman – by Martin McDonagh
- Frida K. – by Gloria Montero
- What Lies Before Us – by Morris Panych
- Hana's Suitcase – by Karen Levine
- Bird Brain – by Albert Wendt
- Penelope vs. The Aliens! – by Chris Bullough and Jared Matsunaga-Turnbull

== 2007–2008 ==
- Noises Off – by Michael Frayn
- I, Claudia – by Kirsten Thomson
- Hana's Suitcase – by Emil Sher
- Vimy – by Vern Thiessen
- A Christmas Carol – by Charles Dickens
- Beauty and the Beast – music by Alan Menken, lyrics by Howard Ashman and Tim Rice, book by Linda Woolverton
- Shining City – by Conor McPherson
- Macbeth – by William Shakespeare
- The December Man – by Colleen Murphy
- Half-Life – by John Mighton
- Fire – by Paul Ledoux and David Young

== 2008–2009 ==
- Pride and Prejudice – by Jane Austen, adapted by Tom Wood
- Billy Twinkle, Requiem for a Golden Boy – by Ronnie Burkett
- The Blonde, the Brunette and the Vengeful Redhead – by Robert Hewett
- The Forbidden Phoenix – by Marty Chan
- A Christmas Carol – by Charles Dickens, adapted by Tom Wood
- Scorched – by Wajdi Mouawad
- Three Mo' Tenors – by Marion J. Caffey
- Julius Caesar – by William Shakespeare
- Doubt, a parable – by John Patrick Shanley
- Extinction Song – by Ron Jenkins
- The Wizard of Oz – by L. Frank Baum

== 2009–2010 ==
- The Drowsy Chaperone – by Bob Martin and Don McKellar
- Blackbird – by David Harrower
- The Jungle Book – by Rudyard Kipling, adapted by Tracey Power
- Rock 'n' Roll – by Tom Stoppard
- A Christmas Carol – by Charles Dickens, adapted by Tom Wood
- Wingfield's Lost and Found – by Dan Needles
- Sweeney Todd: The Demon Barber of Fleet Street – by Hugh Wheeler
- Courageous – by Michael Healey
- The Glass Menagerie – by Tennessee Williams
- The Drowning Girls – by Beth Graham, Charlie Tomlinson and Daniela Vlaskalic
- As You Like It – by William Shakespeare
- Beauty and the Beast – music by Alan Menken, lyrics by Howard Ashman and Tim Rice, book by Linda Woolverton

== 2010–2011 ==
- The Three Musketeers – adaptation by Tom Wood; book by Alexandre Dumas
- Little Women: The Musical – by Allan Knee, based on the book by Louisa May Alcott
- True Love Lives – by Brad Fraser
- A Christmas Carol – adaptation by Tom Wood, based on the book by Charles Dickens
- Rick: The Rick Hansen Story – by Dennis Foon
- Another Home Invasion – by Joan McLeod
- Billy Bishop Goes to War – by John Gray
- Hunchback – by Jonathan Christenson
- Studies in Motion – by Kevin Kerr
- Intimate Apparel – by Lynn Nottage
- August: Osage County – by Tracy Letts

== 2011–2012 ==
- Death of a Salesman – by Arthur Miller
- Blind Date – by Rebecca Northan
- A Christmas Carol – adaptation by Tom Wood, based on the book by Charles Dickens
- This is What Happens Next – by Daniel MacIvor
- The Sound of Music – by Howard Lindsay & Russel Crouse
- Red – by John Logan
- Seussical – by Lynn Ahrens & Stephen Flaherty, based on the works of Dr. Seuss
- The Rocky Horror Show – by Richard O'Brien
- Penny Plain – by Ronnie Burkett
- A Midsummer Night's Dream – by William Shakespeare
- God of Carnage – Yasmina Reza, translated by Christopher Hampton

== 2012–2013 ==
- A Few Good Men – by Aaron Sorkin
- Next to Normal – book and lyrics by Brian Yorkey, music by Tom Kitt
- A Christmas Carol – by Charles Dickens, adapted by Tom Wood
- Private Lives – by Noël Coward
- Ride the Cyclone – by Jacob Richmond, music by Brooke Maxwell & Jacob Richmond
- The Kite Runner – adapted by Matthew Spangler, based on the novel by Khaled Hosseini
- The Penelopiad – by Margaret Atwood
- Monty Python's Spamalot – book & lyrics by Eric Idle, music by John Du Prez & Eric Idle

== 2013–2014 ==
- Long Day's Journey Into Night – by Eugene O'Neill
- 2 Pianos 4 Hands – by Ted Dykstra & Richard Greenblatt
- Clybourne Park – by Bruce Norris
- Mary Poppins – by Julian Fellowes
- Romeo and Juliet – by William Shakespeare
- Make Mine Love – by Tom Wood
- The Daisy Theatre – by Ronnie Burkett
- A Christmas Carol – Adapted by Tom Wood – Based on the story by Charles Dickens
- Do You Want What I Have Got? A Craigslist Cantata – by Veda Hille and Bill Richardson

== 2014–2015 ==
- Kim's Convenience – by Ins Choi
- The Daisy Theatre – by Ronnie Burkett
- One Man, Two Guvnors – by Richard Bean
- A Christmas Carol – adaptation by Tom Wood, based on the book by Charles Dickens
- Venus in Fur – by David Ives
- Playing with Fire – by Kirstie McLellan Day and Theoren Fleury
- Life, Death and The Blues – by Raoul Bhaneja
- Vigilante – by Jonathan Christenson
- Arcadia – by Tom Stoppard
- Avenue Q – by Jeff Whitty, music and lyrics by Robert Lopez and Jeff Marx

== 2015–2016 ==
- BOOM – by Rick Miller
- Evangeline - by Ted Dykstra
- A Christmas Carol – adaptation by Tom Wood, based on the book by Charles Dickens
- Chelsea Hotel – by Tracey Power
- Who's Afraid of Virginia Woolf – by Edward Albee
- The Gay Heritage Project – by Damien Atkins, Paul Dunn and Andrew Kushnir
- Alice Through the Looking Glass – by Lewis Carroll, adapted for the stage by James Reaney
- Other Desert Cities – by Jon Robin Baitz
- West Side Story – book by Arthur Laurents, music by Leonard Bernstein, lyrics by Stephen Sondheim

== 2016–2017 ==
- The Curious Incident of the Dog in the Night Time – by Simon Stephens
- Bittergirl – The Musical – by Annabel Fitzsimmons, Alison Lawrence, and Mary Francis Moore
- Million Dollar Quartet – by Colin Escott and Floyd Mutrux
- A Christmas Carol – adaptation by Tom Wood, based on the book by Charles Dickens
- Fortune Falls – by Jonathan Christensen
- Disgraced – by Ayad Akhtar
- Crazy for You – music and lyrics by George Gershwin and Ira Gershwin, book by Ken Ludwig
- Peter and the Starcatcher – stage adaptation by Rick Elice, based on the novel by Dave Barry and Ridley Pearson
- Sense and Sensibility – adapted by Tom Wood from novel by Jane Austen

== 2017–2018 ==
- Shakespeare in Love – based on the Screenplay by Marc Norman and Tom Stoppard, adapted for the stage by Lee Hall
- Hadestown – by Anaïs Mitchell, developed with and directed by Rachel Chavkin
- The Humans - by Stephen Karam
- Empire of the Sun – by Tetsuro Shigematsu
- A Christmas Carol – adaptation by Tom Wood, based on the book by Charles Dickens
- Children of God – by Corey Payette
- Silver Arrow – by Mieko Ouchi
- Ubuntu: The Capetown Project – by D. Cloran, M.Grootboom, D.Hay, D. Jansen, H. Lewis, M. Monteith, and A. Nebulane
- Mamma Mia! – Music & lyrics by Benny Andersson and Björn Ulvaeus with Some songs Stig Anderson, Book by Catherine Johnson
- Undercover – by Rebecca Northan with Bruce Horak

== 2018–2019 ==
- Once – by Enda Walsh
- Redpatch - by Raes Calvert and Sean Harris Oliver
- Miss Bennet: Christmas at Pemberley – by Margot Melcon and Lauren Gunderson
- A Christmas Carol – adaptation by Tom Wood, based on the book by Charles Dickens
- Sweat – by Lynn Nottage
- Matilda the Musical – Written by Dennis Kelly and Tim Minchin, based on the book by Roald Dahl
- The Candidate - by Kat Sandler
- The Party- by Kat Sandler (played in repertory with The Candidate)
- The Tempest -by William Shakespeare

== 2019–2020 ==
Ring of Fire: The Music of Johnny Cash – Created by Richard Maltby Jr.; conceived by William Meade

The Color Purple – Book by Marsha Norman; music & lyrics by Brenda Russell, Allee Williss, and Stephen Bray

Fight Night – By Alexander Devriendt, Angelo Tijssens, and the Cast

Six – By Toby Marlow and Lucy Moss

A Christmas Carol – A new adaptation by David van Belle, Based on the Novella by Charles Dickens

Cost of Living – By Martyna Majok

Every Brilliant Thing – By Duncan Macmillan with Jonny Donahoe

As You Like It – Written by William Shakespeare; adapted and directed by Daryl Cloran

This season included delays in programming during the Coronavirus pandemic.

== 2020–2021 ==
A Brimful of Asha – By Asha and Ravi Jain

A Christmas Carol – A new adaptation by David van Belle, Based on the Novella by Charles Dickens

Heaven – Written by Cheryl Foggo

Mary’s Wedding: a Métis Love Story – By Stephen Massicotte, adapted by Tai Amy Grauman

The Garneau Block – By Belinda Cornish; Based on the novel by Todd Babiak

Bears – By Matthew MacKenzie, Produced By Punctuate! Theatre and Dreamspeakers

== 2021–2022 ==
The Fiancée – By Holly Lewis, Directed by Daryl Cloran

A Christmas Carol – By David van Belle, Based on the novella by Charles Dickens

Peter Pan Goes Wrong – By Henry Lewis, Henry Shields, and Jonathan Sayer

Jane Eyre – By Erin Shields, Based on the novel by Charlotte Brontë

The Herd – By Kenneth T. Williams

9 to 5: The Musical – By Patricia Resnick, Music by Dolly Parton

== 2022–2023 ==
Clue – Based on the screenplay by Jonathan Lynn, Written by Sandy Rustin, Additional Material by Hunter Foster and Eric Price

Network – Adapted for the Stage by Lee Hall, Based on the Paddy Chayefsky film

The Wolves – By Sarah DeLappe, A Maggie Tree Production in Association with the Citadel Theatre

Almost a Full Moon – Written by Charlotte Corbeil-Coleman with Hawksley Workman, inspired by and featuring the songs of Hawksley Workman

A Christmas Carol – By David van Belle, Based on the novella by Charles Dickens

Deafy – By Chris Dodd

The Royale – By Marco Ramirez

Jersey Boys – Book by Marshall Brickman & Rick Elice, Music by Bob Gaudio, Lyrics by Bob Crewe

Pride and Prejudice – By Kate Hamill, Based on the novel by Jane Austen

Trouble In Mind – By Alice Childress

First Métis Man of Odesa – By Matthew MacKenzie and Mariya Khomutova, A presentation of the Punctuate! Theatre Production

Prison Dancer – Music and Lyrics by Romeo Candido, Book by Romeo Candido and Carmen De Jesus

== 2023–2024 ==
Six – By Toby Marlow and Lucy Moss

The Importance of Being Earnest – By Oscar Wilde

Little Shop of Horrors – Book and Lyrics by Howard Ashman, Music by Alan Menken, Based on the film by Roger Corman. Produced in Association with the Arts Club Theatre Company in Vancouver.

A Christmas Carol – By David van Belle, Based on the novella by Charles Dickens

Made in Italy – By Farren Timoteo

Rubaboo A Métis Cabaret with Andrea Menard – Written by Andrea Menard, Music by Andrea Menard and Robert Walsh

The Sound of Music – Music by Richard Rodgers, Lyrics by Oscar Hammerstein II, Book by Howard Lindsay and Russell Crouse. A co-production with Royal Manitoba Theatre Centre

The Mountaintop – By Katori Hall

The Three Musketeers – Adapted by Catherine Bush, from the novel by Alexandre Dumas, a co-production with Arts Club Theatre Company

== 2024–2025 ==
A Streetcar Named Desire — By Tennessee Williams

The Ballad of Johnny and June — Book by Robert Cary and Des McAnuff, Music and Lyrics by Johnny Cash, June Carter and others

Frozen — Music and Lyrics by Kristen Anderson-Lopez and Robert Lopez, Book by Jennifer Lee

A Midsummer Night’s Dream: The 70’s Musical — By William Shakespeare, Adapted by Daryl Cloran and Kayvon Khoshkam

Heist — By Arun Lakra

Little Women — Based on the books Little Women & Good Wives by Louisa May Alcott, Adapted for the stage by Jordi Mand

Bear Grease — A LightningCloud Production

Goblin: Macbeth — A Spontaneous Theatre Creation by Rebecca Northan with Bruce Horak

The Play That Goes Wrong — By Henry Lewis, Henry Shields & Jonathan Sayer, Directed by Dennis Garnhum

A Christmas Carol — By David van Belle, Adapted from the novel by Charles Dickens

== 2025–2026 ==
Legally Blonde — Music and lyrics by Laurence O'Keefe and Nell Benjamin and Book by Heather Hach

Life of Pi — Based on the novel by Yann Martel, adapted for the stage by Lolita Chakrabarti

Vinyl Cafe: The Musical — Based on the Vinyl Cafe Stories by Stuart McLean, With Songs by Colleen Dauncey and Akiva Romer-Segal, Adapted for the Stage by Georgina Escobar

Death of a Salesman — By Arthur Miller

The Wizard of Oz — By L. Frank Baum, With Music and Lyrics by Harold Arlen and E.Y. Harburg

Casey and Diana — By Nick Green, Directed by Lana Michelle Hughes

Cyrano de Bergerac — By Edmond Rostand, Adapted by Jessy Ardern

Big Stuff — Written and Created by Matt Baram & Naomi Snieckus, Co-Created and Directed by Kat Sandler

Burning Mom — Written and Directed by Mieko Ouchi

Holiday Presentations

A Christmas Carol — By David van Belle, Based on the novel by Charles Dickens

Bear Grease (Holiday Special) — A LightningCloud production

== 2026-2027 ==
Murder on the Orient Express — By Agatha Christie, Adapted by Ken Ludwig

The Great Gatsby — By F. Scott Fitzgerald, Adapted by Erin Shields

Annie — Book by Thomas Meehan, Music by Charles Strouse, Lyrics by Martin Charnin

Sense & Sensibility — By Jessica B. Hill & Daryl Cloran, based on the novel by Jane Austen.

The Comeback — By Trish Cooper and Sam Vint

Come from Away — Book, music, and lyrics by Irene Sankoff and David Hein

Our Little Secret — Written by Noam Tomaschoff, Music by Ryan Peters

Mrs. Krishnan's Party — By Jacob Rajan and Justin Lewis

Seasonal Presentations

The 25th Annual Putnam County Spelling Bee — Music & Lyrics by William Finn, Book by Rachel Sheinken, Conceived by Rebecca Feldman, Additional Material by Jay Reiss.

A Christmas Carol — By David Van Belle, based on the novella by Charles Dickens.
