= James MacDonald (actor) =

James MacDonald is a Canadian theatre director, actor, and the former artistic director of Western Canada Theatre. He was the first artistic director of Edmonton's FreeWill Shakespeare Festival (1997–2001). From 2006–2016, he was the associate artistic director of the Citadel Theatre.

== Early years ==
MacDonald was born in Montreal and raised in Edmonton, Alberta. He was trained at the Banff School of Fine Arts, and graduated from the University of Alberta's Bachelor of Fine Arts acting program in 1989. In 1989, he was a co-founder of the Freewill Shakespeare Festival. In 2002, he directed The Old Ladies by Rodney Ackland and then made his Citadel Theatre directing debut in 2004 with Stones in His Pockets, starring John Ulyatt and John Kirkpatrick.

== Career ==
MacDonald works as a director, actor, educator, and dramaturge for new Canadian stage plays. His work as a director includes productions at the Stratford Festival (Julius Caesar), the Shaw Festival (The Old Ladies), the Canadian Stage Company (Fire, Much Ado About Nothing and As You Like It), the Royal Manitoba Theatre Centre (A Few Good Men and Sherlock Holmes and the Case of the Jersey Lily) and over 15 productions at Edmonton's Citadel Theatre (Clybourne Park, Vimy, God of Carnage and Venus in Fur).

As a director, dramaturge, and actor, MacDonald has been involved in the development of over 35 new Canadian plays, including his direction of Vimy (Citadel Theatre), Miss Shakespeare (Musical TheatreWorks), With a Twist (Lunchbox Theatre, Calgary), and Conni Massing's Myth of Summer (Alberta Theatre Projects), and his dramaturgy for Firehall Arts Centre's production of Chelsea Hotel: the Songs of Leonard Cohen—which has toured nationally, most recently to the Belfry Theatre, Theatre Passe Muraille, Theatre Calgary and the Banff Centre.

As an actor, he has worked for theatres both across Canada and internationally. He created the role of Einstein in Einstein's Gift at the Citadel Theatre. He played the main role of Ebenezer Scrooge in the Citadel Theatre's annual production of A Christmas Carol from 2011–2015. He is a regular guest instructor/director for the University of Alberta's BFA Acting Program and teaches workshops in Shakespearean text and the audition process. MacDonald is a former national Councilor for the Canadian Actors' Equity Association, and former Secretary of the Edmonton Performers' Branch of ACTRA.

== Awards ==
- Jessie Richardson Award for Outstanding Production of a Musical for Miss Shakespeare for Musical TheatreWorks in Vancouver
- Dora Mavor Moore Award for Outstanding Direction of a Musical for Canadian Stage's production of Paul LeDoux's FIRE
- Betty Mitchel Award for Outstanding Direction of a Musical for With a Twist
- Elizabeth Sterling Haynes Award for Outstanding Direction for the Citadel Theatre's production of the world premiere of Vern Thiessen's VIMY
- Elizabeth Sterling Haynes Nomination for Outstanding Direction of Venus in Fur for The Citadel Theatre
- Elizabeth Sterling Haynes Award for Outstanding performance by an Actor for Einstein's Gift and Of Mice and Men for the Citadel Theatre
- Ovation Award Nomination for Outstanding Direction of the world premiere of Miss Shakespeare for Musical Theatreworks in Vancouver

== Stage productions ==
=== Director (select) ===
- Peter and the Star Catcher (Citadel Theatre, 2017)
- Who's Afraid of Virginia Woolf (Citadel Theatre, 2016)
- Miss Shakespeare (Musical TheatreWorks, 2015)
- Venus in Fur (Citadel Theatre, 2015)
- Sherlock Holmes and the Case of the Jersey Lily (Royal Manitoba Theatre Centre, 2014)
- Clybourne Park (Citadel Theatre, 2014)
- A Few Good Men (Royal Manitoba Theatre Centre/Citadel Theatre, 2011)
- Billy Bishop Goes to War (Citadel Theatre, 2010)
- As You Like It (Citadel Theatre, 2010)
- Julius Caesar (Stratford Festival, 2009)
- The Blonde, Brunette, and the Vengeful Redhead (Citadel Theatre, 2008)
- Fire (Canadian Stage Company/Citadel Theatre, 2008)
- Shining City (Citadel Theatre, 2008)
- VIMY (Citadel Theatre, 2007)
- With a Twist (Lunchbox Theatre, 2007)
- The Winter's Tale (Rivercity Shakespeare Festival, 2007)
- I am My Own Wife (Citadel Theatre, 2006)
- Equus (Citadel Theatre, 2006)
- The Taming of the Shrew (Rivercity Shakespeare Festival, 2006)

=== Actor ===
- Christmas Carol – Scrooge (Bob Baker/Citadel Theatre)
- Blackbird – Ray (Wayne Paquette/Citadel Theatre, 2009)
- Omnium Gatherum – Terrence (David Storch/Canadian Stage, 2005)
- Amadeus – von Strack (Morris Panych/Canadian Stage/Citadel Theatre 2004)
- Henry V – Henry V (Ashley Wright/Rivercity Shakespeare Festival 2003)
- Einstein's Gift – Albert Einstein (David Storch/Citadel Theatre 2003)
- Of Mice and Men – Slim (Dennis Garnum/Royal Manitoba Theatre Centre/Citadel Theatre, 1999)
