= Cloran =

Cloran is a surname. Notable people with the surname include:

- Daryl Cloran (born 1974), Canadian theatre director
- Henry Joseph Cloran (1855–1928), Canadian lawyer, educator, journalist, and politician
