= Tribes (play) =

Play by Nina Raine

- Theatrical poster for NYC production
- Original language: English; British Sign Language
- Written by: Nina Raine
- Characters: Billy; Sylvia; Daniel; Christopher; Beth; Ruth
- Subject: Language, families, culture
- Genre: Drama
- Setting: London, 2010

Premiere
- Date: October 14, 2010
- Place: Royal Court Theatre, London, 2010; North American premiere, Barrow St. Theater, New York City, 2012

Tribes is a play by English playwright Nina Raine that had its world premiere in 2010 at London's Royal Court Theatre and its North American premiere Off-Broadway at the Barrow Street Theatre in 2012. The play won the 2012 Drama Desk Award for Outstanding Play.

== Theme ==
Nina Raine explained in a 2010 interview that the idea of writing the play came to her after she saw a documentary about a deaf couple who were expecting a child, and they said that they hoped their child would be deaf. She said that it occurred to her that a family was a tribe, whose members wanted to pass on values, beliefs and language to their children. She began to see that there were "tribes everywhere," in groups including individual families and religious communities, with their own rituals and hierarchies that are hard to understand by "outsiders."

The play focuses on a dysfunctional Jewish British family, made up of the parents Beth and Christopher and three grown children living at home, Daniel, Ruth and Billy, the last of whom is deaf, raised to read lips and speak but without knowledge of sign language. When Billy meets Sylvia, a hearing woman born to deaf parents who is now slowly going deaf herself, his interaction with her (including her teaching him sign language) reveals some of the languages, beliefs, and hierarchies of the family and the "extended family" of the deaf community.

== Productions ==
=== World premiere ===
The play was first staged October 14-November 13, 2010 at the Royal Court Theatre in London. It was directed by Roger Michell and starred Jacob Casselden, Nina Markham, Michelle Terry, Stanley Townsend, Harry Treadaway, and Phoebe Waller-Bridge.

=== North America ===
The play premiered Off-Broadway at the Barrow Street Theatre on March 4, 2012, and closed on January 20, 2013, having been extended twice. Directed by David Cromer, the cast starred Will Brill, Russell Harvard, Susan Pourfar, Gayle Rankin, Jeff Perry, and Mare Winningham. The Scenic Design was by Scott Pask, costumes by Tristan Raines, lights by Keith Parham, sound by Daniel Kluger and projections by Jeff Sugg.

The production had a West Coast transfer after closing in New York and was remounted at the Centre Theater Group, The Mark Taper Forum, Los Angeles, for a limited run from February 2013 through April 2013, and with most of the original cast (NY replacements Lee Roy Rogers and Jeff Still took over as Beth and Christopher).

It then ran at the La Jolla Playhouse, San Diego, California, in June and July 2013, also directed by David Cromer. The play ran at the Guthrie Theater in Minneapolis, Minnesota, from October through November 2013, directed by Wendy C. Goldberg. It was then produced by Artists Repertory Theatre in Portland, Oregon in February 2015.

The Canadian debut was produced by Theatrefront in association with Canadian Stage and Theatre Aquarius with shows at Toronto's Berkeley Street Theatre. The cast included Stephen Drabicki, Patricia Fagan, Nancy Palk, Joseph Ziegler, Holly Lewis and Dylan Trowbridge, directed by Daryl Cloran.

== Critical reception ==
Critical reviews for both productions of the play were overwhelmingly positive, with the Royal Court Theatre website listing four-star reviews by critics including those for the Sunday Express, Daily Telegraph, Sunday Telegraph, Financial Times, Times, and others. The London production earned an Olivier Award nomination for Best Play. and the same kind of positive reviews for the New York production, including a "critic's pick" review from The New York Times.

In The New York Times review, Ben Brantley wrote: "A smart, lively, and beautifully acted new play that asks us to hear how we hear, in silence as well as in speech...I’ve rarely encountered a cast that finds as many far-reaching shades of meaning in tones of voice as this one does. Every member of the ensemble is spot-on.”

== Awards and nominations ==
The play received six Lucille Lortel Award nominations, four Outer Critics Circle nominations, and two Drama League Award nominations, winning the following awards:

- 2012 Drama Desk Award for Outstanding Play
- 2012 New York Drama Critics Circle Award, Best Foreign Play
- 2012 Obie Award, Performance, Susan Pourfar
- 2012 Off-Broadway Alliance Award – Best Play
