= Gordon McDougall (theatre director) =

British theatre director and academic

Gordon McDougall is a British theatre director and academic. He was educated at Latymer Upper School.

He has been artistic director of the Traverse Theatre, Granada TV’s Stables Theatre, the Oxford Playhouse (1974–84) and the Citadel Theatre, Edmonton, Canada (1984–87). From 1996 to 2001 he was Principal of the Guildford School of Acting and then became Director of Drama at the University of Oklahoma.

He was twice nominated by London critics as Best Director and his productions have been seen all over Britain and in 15 foreign countries. He has worked extensively at RADA and for Granada Television. With Michael Apted he selected the original children for Seven Up!.

Gordon McDougall has taught at over a dozen universities in Europe and the Americas. He currently runs a consultancy company, Drastic Action using theatrical techniques, and, until 2008, wrote and hosted Poem for Today, a daily poetry radio show broadcast in the US.

He is currently serving as Principal at the Musical Theatre School in Shepton Mallet, Somerset.
