= Holly Lewis =

Canadian actress and playwright (born 1974)

- Born: December 17, 1974 (age 51); Scarborough, Ontario
- Occupations: Actress, Writer
- Years active: 1999–present
- Spouse: Daryl Cloran
- Children: 2

Holly Lewis (born December 17, 1974) is a Canadian actress and writer. Born and raised in Scarborough, Ontario, she is known for her television and film work, as well as her stage experience.

== Film and television ==
Initially providing minor roles in television shows such as Puppets Who Kill, Lewis's acting career became more strongly introduced into television and film when she joined the regular cast of Ken Finkleman's award-winning satirical television program, The Newsroom. She joined the cast in the second season, which aired in 2004, as George's assistant, Claire. Also in 2004, she played a recurring character on Train 48. She appeared opposite David Boreanaz in These Girls.

== Theatre ==
Holly Lewis has acted in many theatre productions across Canada and internationally. Her work includes: Educating Rita at the Arts Club in Vancouver, Canada,(2015) as well as Western Canada Theatre Molly in the Canadian premiere of Peter and the Starcatcher at Western Canada Theatre and Sylvia in Tribes (play) at Canadian Stage Company for which she received a Dora Award nomination.

== Writing ==
Holly Lewis' most recent play, The Fiancée, was shortlisted for the 55th annual Alberta Playwriting Competition and won the Noviciate Prize. Billed as a "wig-swapping, door-slamming, cake-facing farce", it premiered at the Citadel Theatre in November 2021.
