= Edmonton Heritage Festival =

Annual Canadian festival celebrating Albertan cultural diversity

The Edmonton Heritage Festival is a three-day festival honouring Alberta's cultural heritage and cultural diversity, which is held annually over the Civic Holiday weekend in William Hawrelak Park in Edmonton, Alberta, Canada.

The festival has been organized annually by the Edmonton Heritage Festival Association since 1976. At that time eleven communities united with the intent to display their cultures by offering traditional cuisine, entertainment, interpretive materials, and crafts to visitors.

In 2015, its 40th anniversary, the festival included more than 85 different cultures in over 60 pavilions, where people present their cultural roots and local and national communities. The tents feature food, entertainment, artwork and crafts, and clothing, and teach visitors about various cultures with displays including photos, paraphernalia, and stories.

== Overview ==
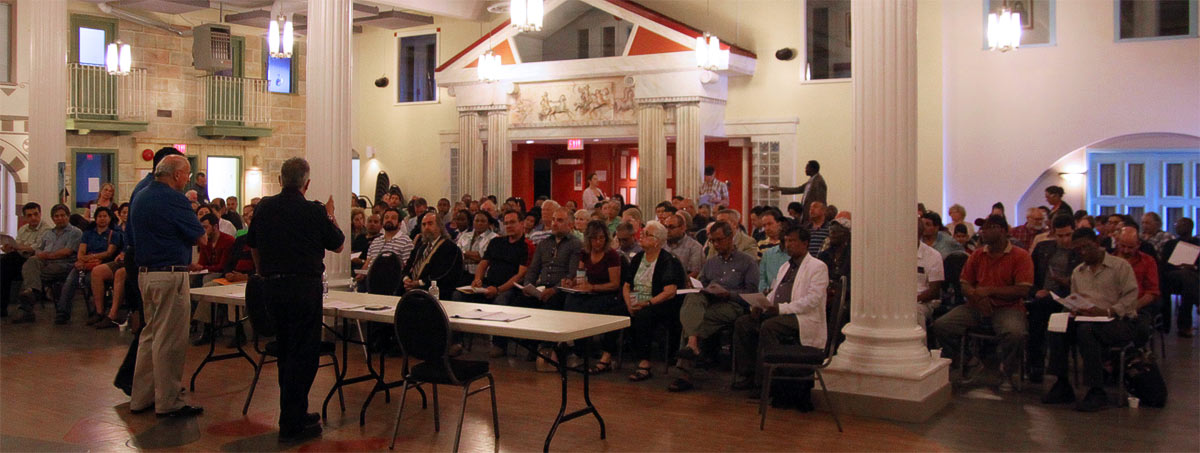
Preparatory Meeting for the 40th annual Servus Heritage Festival in 2015

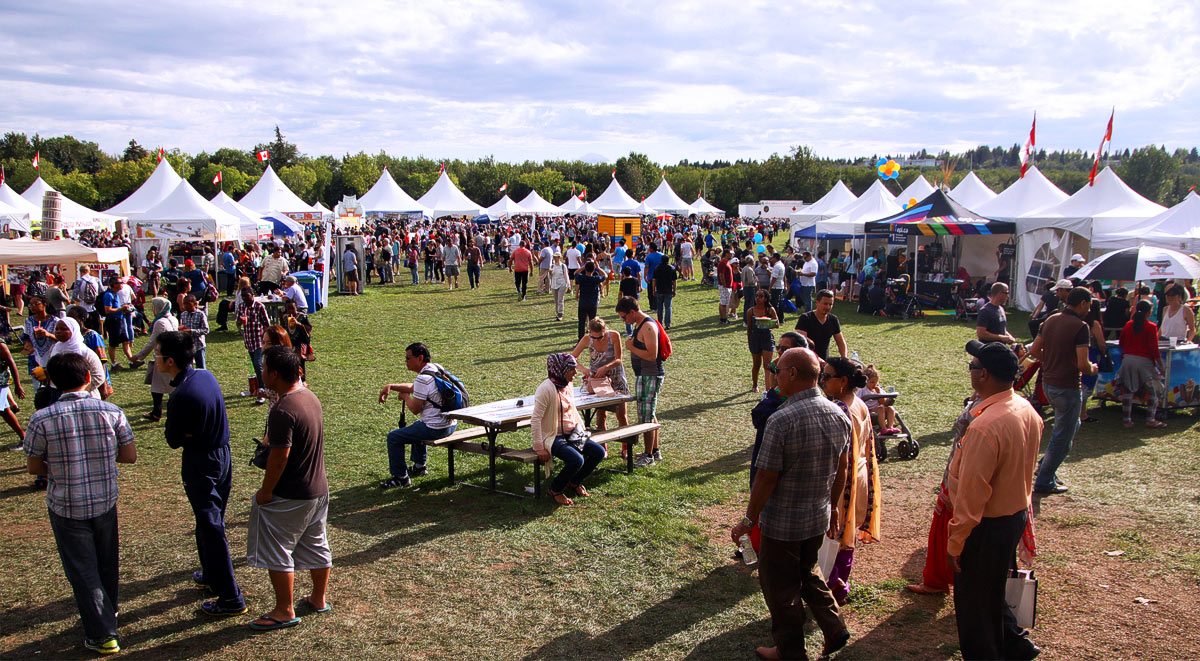
Visitors attending the 40th edition of the Servus Heritage Festival in 2015

The Edmonton Heritage Festival, held annually in Edmonton's Hawrelak Park, is the world's largest three day celebration of multiculturalism. During the August long weekend, tented pavilions representing up to 100 countries and cultures offer over showings of cultural dance and song at shared stages, folk arts and cultural displays in individual tents, home life vignettes, and cultural foods from up to 70 kitchens. The festival requires over 2,200 volunteers over the course of the three days and uses almost 300 tents spread over 60 hectares. Onsite attendance of the 2017 Heritage Festival was 480,000.

The festival is a family-friendly, alcohol and tobacco free event. There is no admission charge to the site, nor is there admission to watch the up to 900 cultural folk music and dance shows on up to 50 shared stages. Admission to over 70 cultural displays is also free. Each county's set of display tents, known as Pavilions, offers a sampling of their unique cultural food and drinks. The organizers of the festival encourage visitors to donate to the local food bank.

William Hawrelak Park offers no public parking (except bicycles) during the festival, but is connected well to the City of Edmonton Transit through exclusive Park'n'Ride services. The park is open throughout the day between 5am and 11pm. Visitors are asked to leave their dogs at home.

The attendance of the festival has increased from 20,000 people in 1976 to 85,000 in 1977, and reached 320,000 in 1982, a record that was matched or beaten by the approximately 320,000 to 340,000 attendees during the 2011 festival. The 2017 festival saw an estimated 498,000 visitors over the three days, with a record Sunday of an estimated 348,000.

The 2023 event ran from August 5 to August 7.

== Presentation of heritage and culture ==
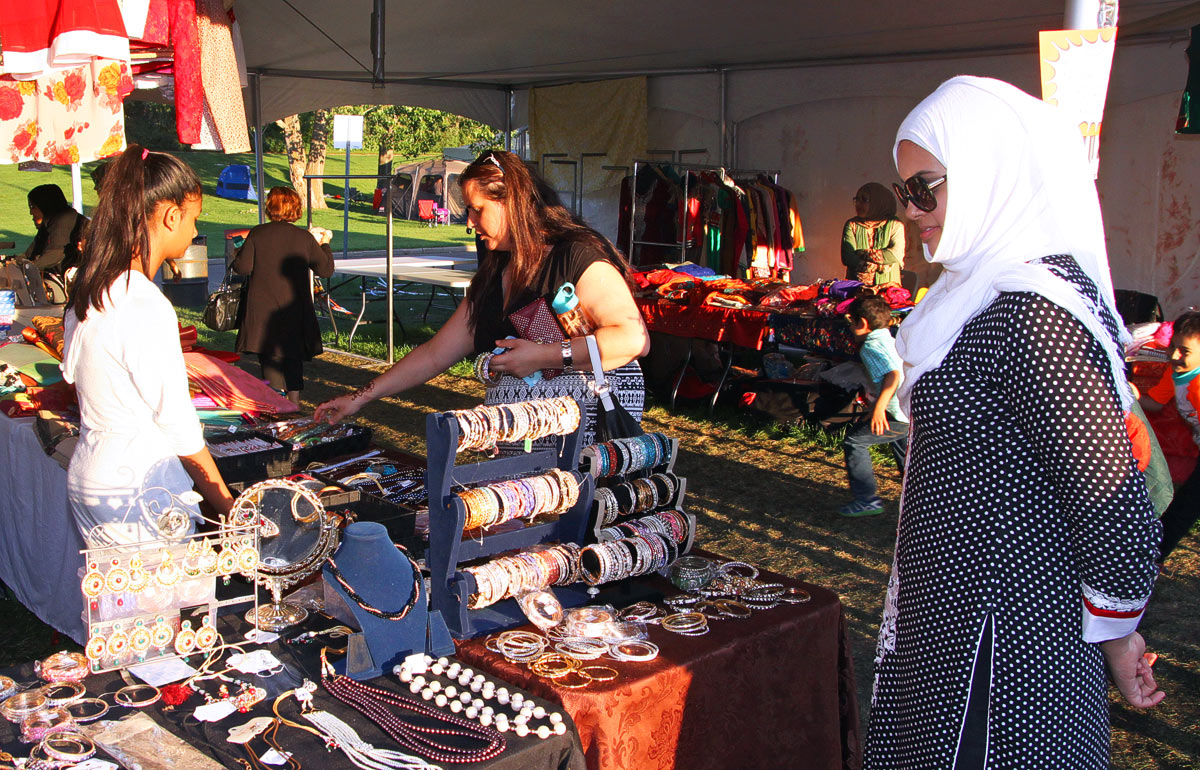
Inside the Bangladeshi Pavilion

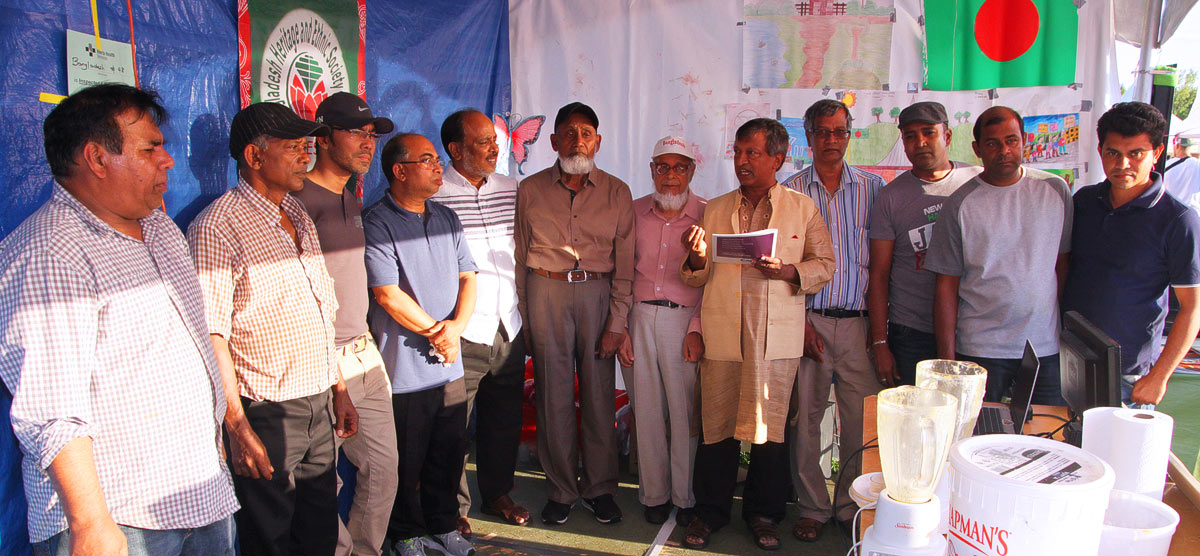
Inauguration of the Heritage special of BHESA's magazine

Heritagefest provides opportunities for local communities and their organizations to present individual ethnic roots, culture, and heritage to a broader audience. In 2015, 85 different cultures were part of this display.

During the 45 years of the festival, a number of forms of heritage presentation have commonly been used, with ethnic food preparation leading the way.

Visitors also experience music and dance performances, and traditional clothes and costumes. Objects originating from different heritages or produced in traditional ways are also available.

Other participants give visitors of the festival an insight into their origin places and historic development. Large printed photos and texts on display, and there are many points of interests such as video and multi-media presentations, re-enactments like the Welsh Revolt initiated by the St. David's Welsh (Wales) pavilion at Heritagefest 2015, and a special-edition magazine distributed by the Bangladesh Heritage and Ethnic Society of Alberta.

== Assisting other Arts, Cultural and Charitable Groups ==
In 1986 The Edmonton Heritage Festival Association funded and built the Heritage Amphitheatre. The Amphitheatre has been used since for thousands of events and activities, annual and perennial. Such events include Freewill Shakespeare, Symphony under the Sky, Edmonton Rockfest, Edmonton Blues Fest, private corporate events, weddings and countless others.

The Association also developed and upgraded Hawrelak Park and its infrastructure including the creation of permanent pavilions, equipment for water and electrical hook-ups, upgrades to the electrical systems and other improvements. This infrastructure is used by most of the festival and events that take part in the park including SilverSkate Festival, Paws in the Park, Edmonton Emergency Preparedness Days, Ice Castle and others.

The Edmonton Heritage Festival Association is also a sponsor of other local cultural sites, events and groups like the Edmonton Federation of Community Leagues 100th Anniversary Pavilion, CariWest, Say it Loud, event is a major fundraiser for the food bank in the city of Edmonton. Nonperishable food and cash donations from visitors are collected on site. Donations between 1984 and 2013 measured over 1.4 million kilograms, with currently a yearly contribution of about 50,000 kilograms.

The festival organization also asks visitors to donate unused food tickets, which are then converted into money. In 2014 this raised more than $50,000 for the food bank. An additional $50,000 in monetary donations were raised.

The Edmonton Heritage Festival Organization helps develop and upgrade Hawrelak Park and its infrastructure. The creation of pavilions, equipment of water and electrical hook-ups, upgrades to the electrical systems and other improvements are shared with other events featured in the park.

== Origins ==
The festival's official mission is "to promote public awareness, understanding, and appreciation for cultural diversity through an annual summer festival, as well as to provide educational events, programs, and/or projects on a year-round basis."

In 1974 the Government of Alberta, acting through the Minister of Culture, Dr. Horst Schmid, declared the first Monday in August to be an annual holiday in order to recognize and celebrate the varied cultural heritage of Albertans.

On June 6, 1974, the first Monday in August became "Heritage Day", "a showcase for displaying Alberta’s cultural diversity." The first celebrations were held in Fort Edmonton Park in 1974 and 1975, and included a multicultural concert with performers from several ethnic communities.

In 1976 the Edmonton Heritage Festival took its current form. Eleven ethno-cultural communities displayed their cultures' traditional cuisine, entertainment, interpretive materials, and crafts in Mayfair Park (subsequently renamed William Hawrelak Park in 1982), where it has been held ever since. 20,000 people attended the festival in 1976. The festival has continued to expand and increase in popularity over the years.

In 1976, Schmid encouraged Edmonton's Commissioner of Public Affairs to appoint several volunteers from the city administration to help transform Heritage Day into the Heritage Festival. This led to the creation of the Edmonton Heritage Festival Association in December 1976.

Attendance has increased from 20,000 people in 1976 to 85,000 in 1977, and reached 320,000 in 1982, a record that was matched or beaten by the approximately 320,000 to 340,000 visitors in 2011. The 2017 festival saw an estimated 498,000 visitors over the three days, with a record Sunday of an estimated 348,000.

== Festival themes ==
The festival selects a special theme phrase to lend a unique element each year. The theme serves to convey the festival's purpose and excitement as well as to encourage people to attend and join the festivities.

Past themes have included the following:

- 1981: The Total Ethnic Experience
- 1985: A Kaleidoscope of Culture
- 1986: Edmonton Heritage Festival 10th Anniversary
- 1987: Come Along and Conga
- 1988: Fiddle Around the World
- 1989: Together We're Better
- 1990: Our Family... The World
- 1993: World Beat
- 1994: World Colours
- 1995: World Flavours
- 1996: Send a Message to the World... We're Proud of Our Heritage 20 Years Proud
- 1998: Tasteful - Our Heritage Your Festival
- 1999: Spirited - Our Heritage Your Festival
- 2000: A Canadian Tapestry of Culture
- 2001: Stirring up Fun
- 2002: Join the Celebration
- 2003: Imagine All the People - Now Meet Them
- 2004: Come Share Our Culture
- 2005: Come Join Our Family
- 2006: Come Be Part Of It!
- 2007: Come Join Your Friends!
- 2008: Come Join the Fun
- 2009: Come for a Perfect Day
- 2010: Come to our 35th Birthday!
- 2011: Come for a Cultural Adventure
- 2012: Come Party!
- 2013: Come ENJOY
- 2014: Come Savour
- 2015: Come for the fun, we're 40!
- 2016: Discover the world
- 2017: The world in a weekend
- 2018: Connect with Culture
- 2019: Adventures Await
- 2020: See the World in 2020
- 2020 Digital Festival: Multicultural Month
- 2021 Celebration: Out of hibernation.
- 2024 Cultural Diversity, Inclusion and Better Together.

== Festival Youth Ambassadors ==
In 2017, the Festival's Board of Directors initiated the Heritage Festival Youth Ambassadors program. Ambassadors are young adults, volunteering on behalf of their pavilions, who take part in a number of events as.

Prior to 2016, the festival appointed a single "Prince" and "Princess", both chosen from the cultural associations that participated in the festival, to act as Honorary Ambassadors. The new Youth Ambassadors program allows for two or more youth from each pavilion, which allows all pavilions to take part.

== Trivia ==
The "World's Longest Churro" was produced during the 2000 festival. It was 77 m long and weighed 30 kg.

Since 1987 a Canadian Citizenship Ceremony has taken place at the amphitheatre of William Hawrelak Park, the Heritage Amphitheatre. During the ceremony, new Canadians are sworn in.

On average, approximately 50,000 kilograms of food is collected at each festival.

== Awards and recognition ==
In 1999, the Edmonton Heritage Festival was designated as one of the "Top 100 Events in North America" by the American Bus Association, the trade organization of the motor coach tour industry.

The festival has also won several awards from the International Festivals & Events Association (IFEA) over the years. Awarded annually as part of the Haas & Wilkerson Pinnacle Awards Competition, the IFEA's Pinnacle Awards "recognize outstanding accomplishments and high quality creative, promotional, operational, and community outreach programs and materials produced by festivals and events around the world."

== See also ==
- Festivals in Edmonton
- Festivals in Alberta
