= Beverley Rosen Simons =

Canadian playwright

Beverley Rosen Simons (born 1938) is a Canadian playwright. Her plays explore artistic form, as well as assumptions of class and gender with a perspicacity ahead of second generation feminism of the 1960s, which influenced her youth.

== Biography ==
Rosen was born in Flin Flon, Manitoba, in 1938, and attended high school in Edmonton, Alberta. She identified as an artist early, and had difficulty deciding whether to study as a pianist or to go into creative writing. With the help of a scholarship to the Banff School of Fine Arts, she decided to pursue writing and eventually enrolled at McGill to study English literature in 1955. At McGill, Rosen became increasingly involved in theatre, helping to found the McGill University Players. After transferring to UBC, she graduated with a BA degree in English and Theatre in 1959.

Rosen's first full-length play, The Elephant and the Jewish Question, was a "well-made" domestic drama staged by the Vancouver Little Theatre for the 1968 Dominion Drama Festival. Subsequently, she avoided the conventions of the "well made" form; her travel and extensive reading about theatre in Japan, Hong Kong, Thailand, and India led her to feel "cramped and dissatisfied…in traditional drama forms of the West" (application to the Canada Council, 1970).

Rosen's second full-length play, Crabdance, was greeted by critics as a brilliant, controversial work. It remains Rosen's best-known play. It has received six professional stagings, dramatizations by CBC Radio and CBC TV (never aired), an ACCESS video of the 1976 Citadel Theatre production, and two editions by in Print publications and Talonbooks.

Rosen's short plays The Crusader and Triangle, Preparing, and Green Lawn Rest Home, reveal a growing frustration with the production restrictions of a realism-oriented Canadian theatre establishment. Presented at a University of British Columbia International Critics' Conference in 1976, these polemical plays are rhythmic, graphic, and allegorical. Preparing "takes a solitary character, Jeannie, on a lifelong journey from adolescent rebellion to dowagerhood." Prologue takes aim at the "ratings-oriented" policies of the CBC, and snipes at audiences who want theatre to be "predictable" or "nice". Instead, her works explore fantasy, brinksmanship, and madness through choral and movement elements that de-stabilize notions of identity, fragment time, and expose power structures within families and communities.

Rosen's most ambitious work, Leela Means to Play (1976), is a sprawling epic that has never been professionally produced despite several workshops. It foregrounds serious Canadian social issues featuring the judiciary, the penal system, Indian Reserves, and psychiatric facilities. The size of the cast, the fluid multi-location setting, and the complex social commentary combined with raw emotional undercurrents of the play might have scared producers seeking Canadian hit shows. A master's thesis suggests that the time for Leela Means to Play will "come around" in a future where civil rights issues of the 1960s and 1970s excite more detailed attention, rather than seeming dated.

Rosen's most recent play, Now You See It (1996), is unproduced and unpublished but received a workshop by Necessary Angel theatre (1996). A description of the script can be found on the Canadian Literary Encyclopedia.
