= William Hawrelak Park =

Park in Edmonton, Canada

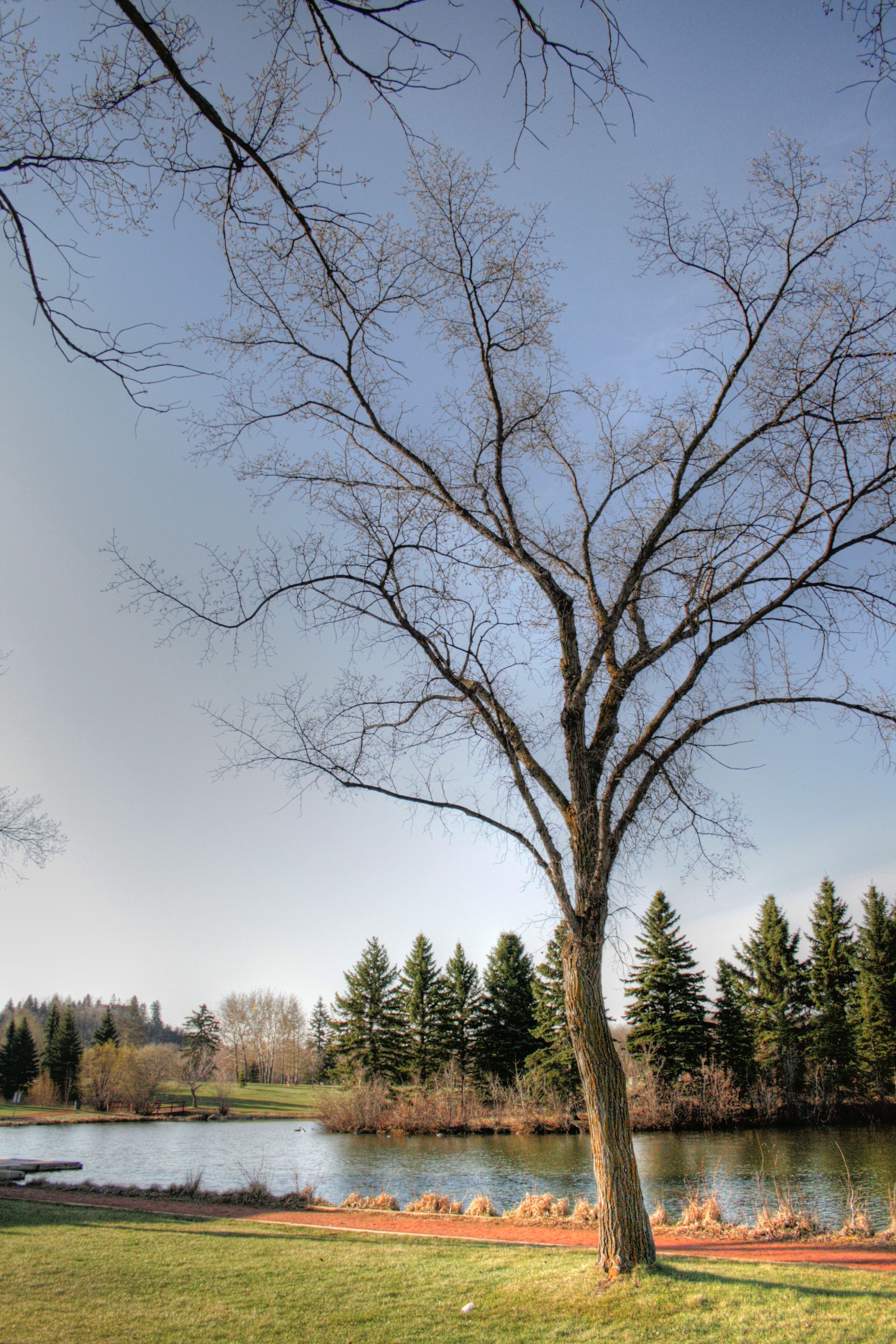
- Corner of lake in Hawrelak Park

- Location within Edmonton
- Location: Edmonton, Alberta, Canada
- Coordinates: 53°31′41″N 113°32′51″W
- Area: 68 hectares (170 acres)
- Created: 1954
- Operator: City of Edmonton
- Open: N/A
- Website: www.edmonton.ca/activities_parks_recreation/parks_rivervalley/william-hawrelak-park

William Hawrelak Park (or simply Hawrelak Park) is a park in Edmonton, Alberta. Formerly known as Mayfair Park, it was initially going to be developed into a 500-lot subdivision; however, when the Strathcona Land Syndicate forfeited their taxes the city obtained the title for the land in 1922. This land lay unused until 1954, when Mayor William Hawrelak proposed to create a 350-acre (1.4 km^{2}) riverside park in this area as it would "fit into the overall park development of the City along the lines of the zoo, and the golf courses and other picnic areas". The digging of the man-made lakes began in 1959 and later was completed in 1964 but had few facilities. The official opening day of Mayfair Park was on Dominion Day, July 1, 1967. It was renamed in 1982 for Hawrelak, who died in office in 1975 while serving as mayor of Edmonton.

== Amenities ==
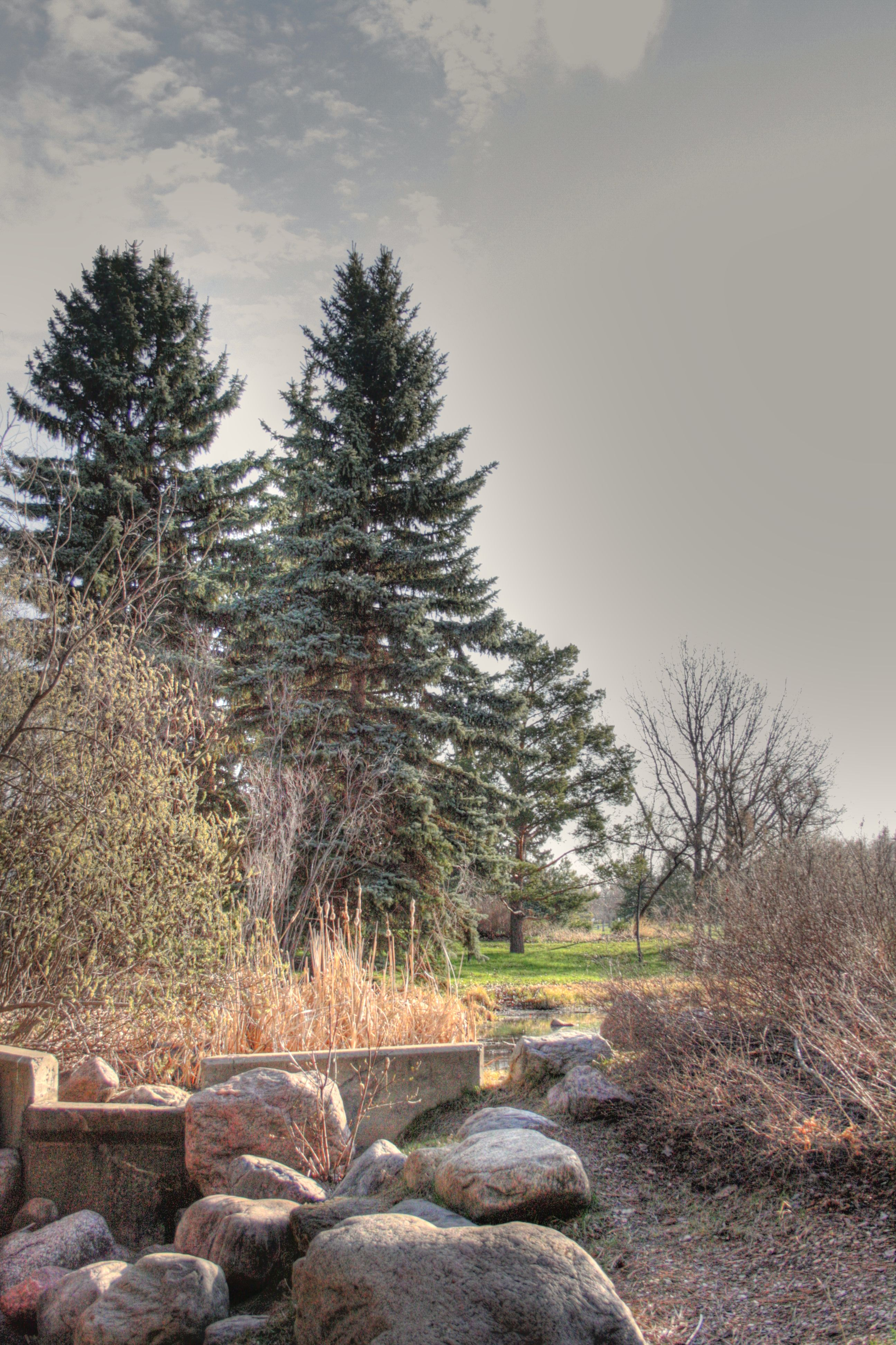
Stream bed in Hawrelak Park

The park is in Edmonton's river valley, next to the North Saskatchewan River. Rented paddleboats are used on the artificial lake during summer. The lake is not used for public swimming, but it has been used for the swimming portion of events when Edmonton hosted the 2001 ITU World Triathlon Championship, and since 2014 as a stop on the annual ITU World Triathlon Series. In the winter, the lake is used as a public skating rink.

As with all City of Edmonton Parks, the park is open to the public 5 am–11 pm, 365 days a year. The park has walking–hiking trails around the perimeter which can be used for cross-country skiing in the winter. There are picnic sites, a playground, and beach volleyball nets on site. Many of the picnic sites feature fire pits.

In 1983, the park was the track cycling venue for the 1983 Summer Universiade.

From 1998 until 2008, the park hosted the Bright Nights Festival around Christmas. Since 1990 the Silver Skate Festival has hosted the Annual Winter Festival of Arts, Culture Recreation and Sport. In 2016 the festival partnered with Ice Castles of America to bring the first ice castle in Canada, and it has called Hawrelak Park home every winter since.

== Pavilions ==
The five on site pavilions were designed by Bittorf & Wensley architects and constructed in 1967-68 and 1973. The design style has been described as "West Coast Modernist" and "Organic Expressionist".

According to ForgottenEdmonton: "these pavilions remain an iconic feature of its landscape over a half-century later. All five are currently considered for inclusion on the City's Inventory of Historic Resources."

== Heritage Amphitheatre ==
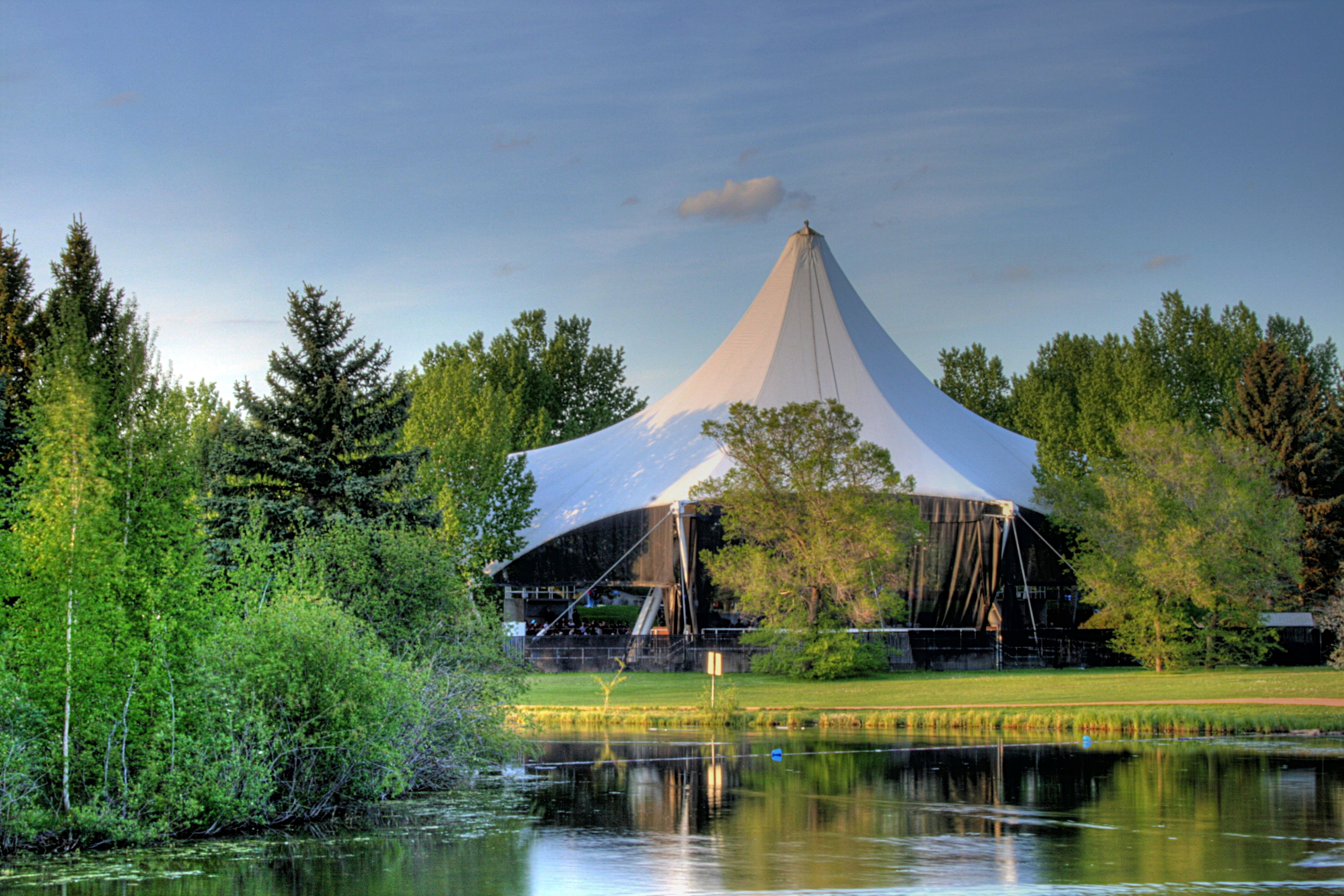
Looking across the lake to the Heritage Amphitheatre

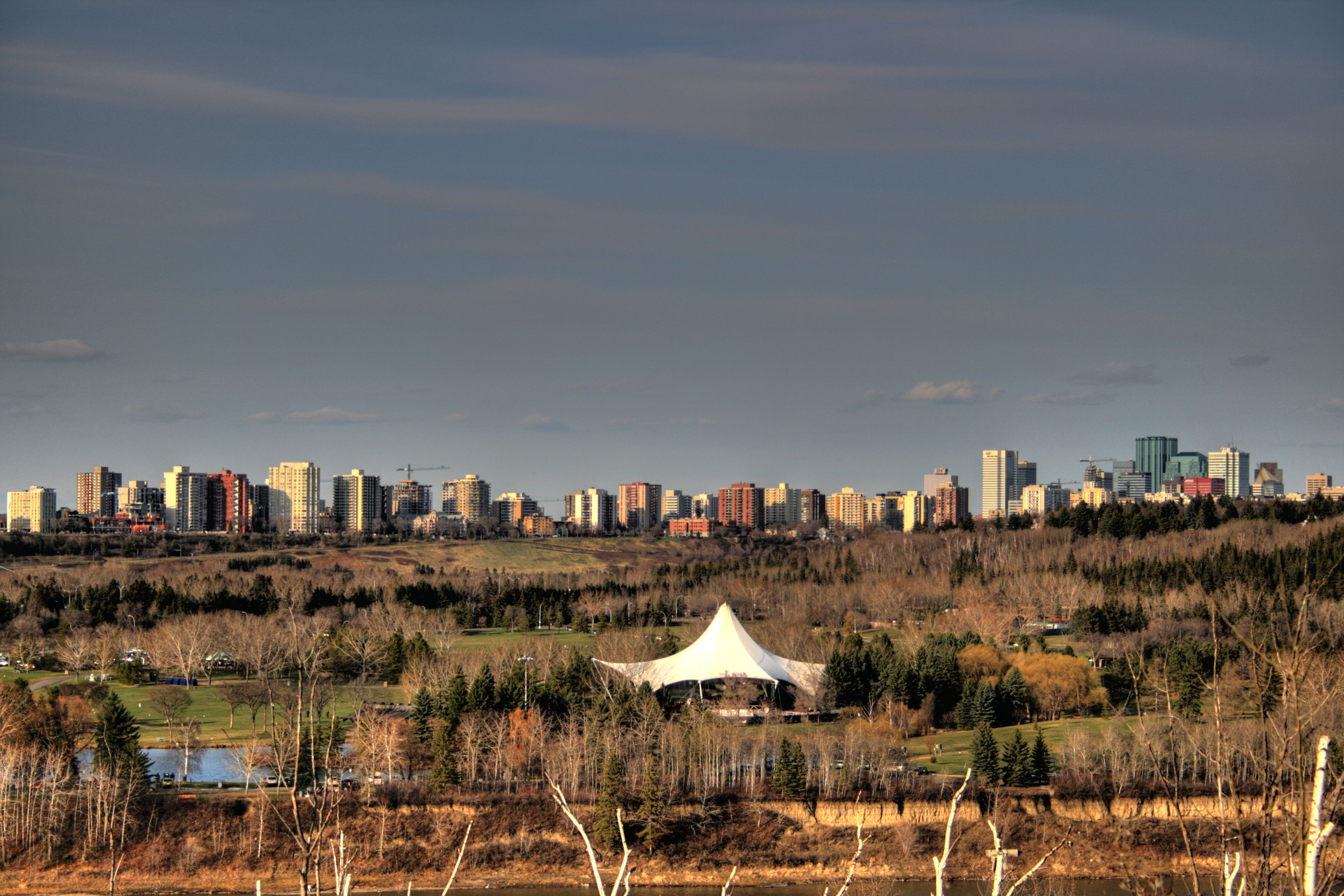
The Heritage Amphitheatre in the North Saskatchewan River valley

The Heritage Amphitheatre is western Canada's largest outdoor amphitheatre, which completed construction in 1985. It has seating for 1,133 people and up to 2,900 people with the surrounding grass area. Each year approximately 50,000 people visit it to enjoy musical, dramatic, and other performances in Edmonton's pleasant summer months. The amphitheatre is host to many of Edmonton's festivals, including the Freewill Shakespeare Festival, Rockfest, Edmonton's Labatt Blues Festival, the Symphony Under the Sky Festival (run by the Edmonton Symphony Orchestra), the Edmonton Heritage Festival (the event that gave the Heritage Amphitheatre its name), and the Interstellar Rodeo Festival. Although the amphitheatre is within Hawrelak Park, it is run by the City of Edmonton Civic Events Office, and not the Parks Department. A wind storm in 2013 ripped the canopy, forcing the replacement of the canopy in 2014, and making events like the Freewill Shakespeare Festival move venues temporarily.

The inside area under the stage contains a green room, two dressing rooms, washrooms, and an office, all for staff and performers. Indoor heated and fully serviced washrooms are available at the back of house for the spectators and areas are set up for vendors to occupy for food and other services. Picnic tables are often set up for grass seating patrons who do not sit in the 1,133 fixed seats, or they may bring seats of their own. Parking has always been a concern for events at the amphitheatre, as there is often more spectators attending the events in the amphitheatre than Hawrelak Park has parking stalls; some parking stalls are also often reserved for staff, performers, and vendors of the event itself. Park and ride is often available for events, supplied in part by the Edmonton Transit System. The buses come straight to Hawrelak Park from the University of Alberta.

== See also ==
- List of Canadian place names of Ukrainian origin
