= Joseph H. Shoctor =

Canadian theatre producer (1922–2001)

Joseph Shoctor OC AOE
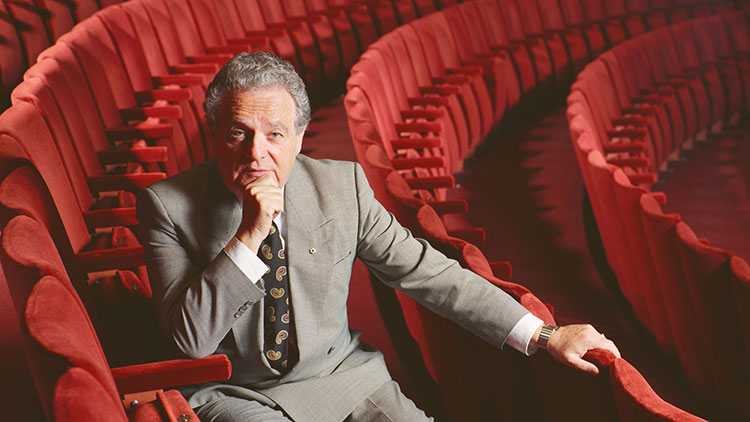
- Dr. Joseph H. Shoctor in the Shoctor Theatre
- Born: Joseph Harvey Shoctor; August 18, 1922; Edmonton, Alberta, Canada
- Died: April 19, 2001 (aged 78); Edmonton, Alberta, Canada
- Education: University of Alberta
- Occupations: lawyer, real estate developer, theatre producer
- Known for: One of the original proprietors of the Citadel Theatre, Edmonton

Joseph Harvey Shoctor (August 18, 1922 – April 19, 2001) was a Canadian theatre producer, real estate developer, and lawyer.

Shoctor was born in Edmonton, Alberta in 1922, the son of a Jewish father, and grew up in the Boyle Street neighbourhood. He first became involved in the theatre industry in his hometown, producing, writing, directing and acting with the Edmonton Little Theatre, Edmonton Light Opera, and entertaining World War II troops. After attending Victoria Composite High School, he attended law school at the University of Alberta and was called to the Alberta bar in 1948. In the 1960s, he worked in New York City where he produced theatre with Norman Twain. In Edmonton in 1965, he purchased the former Salvation Army Citadel building along with friends James L. Martin, Ralph B. MacMillan, and Sandy Mactaggart. The Citadel Theatre was founded on October 12, 1965, with its first opening night on November 10, 1965. The theatre's first production to be performed was Who's Afraid of Virginia Woolf?. Shoctor was also involved with founding of the Edmonton Eskimos of the Canadian Football League, and also served as secretary-manager from 1954 to 1956. He was also governor of the National Theatre School of Canada in Montreal. A real estate developer, he worked on the planning of neighbourhoods near Rio Terrace, Edmonton, and was also a proponent of revitalization of Downtown Edmonton.

Shoctor was made an officer of the Order of Canada in 1986. He received the Ramon John Hnatyshyn Award for Voluntarism in the Performing Arts in 1998 and the Alberta Order of Excellence in 1990. He is a member of the Edmonton Cultural Hall of Fame, inducted as a builder in 1987, and a recipient of an honorary doctor of laws from his alma mater, the University of Alberta, in 1981. A street in Edmonton, Joe Shoctor Alley, is named in his honour.

He suffered a heart attack on April 8, 2001, and died in Edmonton on April 19, 2001. His funeral was held at the Beth Israel Synagogue in Edmonton and he was later buried at the Edmonton Jewish Cemetery.
