= Let Our Children Go! =

Nonfiction book by Ted Patrick

- Authors: Ted Patrick, Tom Dulack
- Language: English
- Genre: nonfiction
- Publisher: E. P. Dutton, Ballantine Books
- Publication date: 1976
- Pages: 285
- ISBN: 9780525144502
- OCLC: 01992126

Let Our Children Go! is a nonfiction book by Ted Patrick with Tom Dulack about Patrick's experience with cult deprogramming. It was first published in 1976 by E. P. Dutton, but was republished by Ballantine Books in 1977. The book alternates between sections written by Patrick and Dulack in describing encounters with cults including the Children of God, the Love Family, the Hare Krishna, and the Unification Church.

== Plot summary ==
Let Our Children Go! is primarily a first-person narrative from Ted Patrick himself, with some commentary from Tom Dulack at the beginning of each chapter. Patrick describes his initial encounters with cults like the Children of God through his son and nephew, and his personal investigation into the Children of God in Santee, California. Eventually, he developed the process of deprogramming through what he called brainwashing at Santee.

Patrick illustrates his notable deprogramming cases like Dan Voll, Kathy Crampton, and so on. Sometimes, he replaces the names of deprogramming subjects to protect their identities. He also details his legal issues that he dealt with up to 1976, and his various successful or otherwise attempts at defending against allegations of kidnapping and false imprisonment through the "choice of evils" defense.

== Reception ==
Joni Bodart for School Library Journal notes that although "disjointed and hard to follow at times", the book "should make absorbing reading for young adults who might themselves be solicited by the cults". In the Library Journal, Mark R. Yerburgh commended Patrick for having the courage to tackle such a contentious subject matter.

Anson D. Shupe for the Journal for the Scientific Study of Religion calls the book a "collection of apologetic vignettes about Ted Patrick, the archetypical deprogrammer". Shupe believes the book "is replete with instances of Patrick's alleged indefatigability, his altruism, and his monopoly on deprogramming skill", which has the result of dehumanizing groups about which Shupe argues Patrick knows nothing.

Peter Rowley for The Christian Century believes that one of the central messages of the book – that without deprogramming, members of new religious movements generally never leave – is incorrect based on his own experience with members of the International Society for Krishna Consciousness.
