= Ted Patrick =

American deprogrammer (born 1930)

- Born: Theodore Roosevelt Patrick, Jr. 1930 (age 95–96); Chattanooga, Tennessee, U.S.
- Occupations: Deprogrammer; author
- Known for: Anti-cult activism; deprogramming pioneer

Theodore "Ted" Roosevelt Patrick, Jr. (born 1930) is an American anti-cult activist, best known for his invention and prolific use of the practice known as deprogramming. He is sometimes referred to as the "father of deprogramming."

In the early 1970s, following the involvement of his son in a religious cult called The Children of God, Patrick founded an organization called FREECOG (Parents' Committee to Free Our Sons and Daughters from the Children of God), and subsequently became involved with the Citizens' Freedom Foundation (later known as the Cult Awareness Network). Patrick offered what he called "deprogramming" services to people who wanted a family member extracted from a New Religious Movement. His methods involved abduction, forced confinement and physical restraint, food and sleep deprivation, and desecration of the symbols of the victim's faith.

Patrick faced multiple criminal charges and civil proceedings resulting from his deprogramming activities. He was eventually convicted of crimes such as kidnapping, false imprisonment and conspiracy.

== Early life ==
Ted Patrick was born in a red-light district of Chattanooga, Tennessee, in which he was surrounded by "thieves, prostitutes, murderers [and] pimps". He dropped out of high school in tenth grade to help support his family, worked a variety of jobs and opened a nightclub, then became co-chairman of the Nineteenth Ward in Chattanooga. At the age of twenty-five, he left his wife and infant son in Tennessee, and went with a friend to San Diego, California, where he became an activist for the black community. For his efforts in the Watts Riots in 1965, Patrick was awarded the Freedom Foundation Award, which ultimately led to his job as the Special Assistant for Community Affairs, under then-Governor Ronald Reagan.

== Career as a deprogrammer ==
In 1971, Mrs. Samuel Jackson sought Patrick's help in relation to her missing son, Billy. Billy was involved with the group known as the Children of God, who had approached Patrick's own son, Michael, a week prior. Patrick contacted other people whose relatives were in the Children of God, and even pretended to join the group to study how it operated. In the same year, Patrick founded FREECOG (Parents' Committee to Free Our Sons and Daughters from the Children of God) and began developing his theory and practice of deprogramming. He ultimately left his full-time job in order to work on deprogramming full time. In 1974 he joined forces with the more broad-ranging Citizen's Freedom Foundation, which later became the Cult Awareness Network.

Despite a lack of formal education and professional training, in the 1970s Patrick was hired by many people (usually parents of adult children) seeking to have family members "deprogrammed". Deprogramming was a technique developed by Patrick to counter what was thought to be the brainwashing or "programming" of recruits by new religious movements. Such programming was "a sort of mental and psychological blitzing: they confuse and harass you quite effectively so that you often don't know what you are really doing or saying". According to Patrick, cult recruiters had the capacity to place prospective new members in a hypnotic trance without their knowledge or consent. The unconscious state was achieved, he claimed, by the projection of brain waves out of the recruiter's eyes and fingertips, after which post-hypnotic suggestions were placed that rendered the victim susceptible to brainwashing. Patrick's counteractive treatment for the brainwashing consisted of: (1) abducting the NRM member; (2) isolating them at a carefully guarded, remote location; (3) haranguing them about the "cult" in question, while pointing to the love and distress of the relatives present; (4) threatening to never let them go. Physical restraint, detention over days or weeks, food and sleep deprivation, and desecration of the symbols of the victim's faith, could all be used as part of the effort to deprogram the individual. The extreme measures were necessary, according to Patrick, because all cult members have been deprived of their capacity for normal reasoning, and would only respond to physical coercion.

In the aftermath of the Jonestown massacre, Patrick testified before an ad hoc Congressional committee organized in 1979 by Senator Bob Dole. According to The New Republic, Dole intended the hearing to "provide a forum" for Patrick and other anti-cult activists. When interviewed about the possibility of similar murders and mass suicides happening in the U.S., Patrick said "I think they are going to start happening like wildfire".

In 1976 Patrick had claimed personal involvement in over a thousand deprogrammings; by 1980 the number had increased to over two thousand. Although he had initially targeted the Children of God, he quickly diversified. He eventually came to regard thousands of groups as cults, all of them operating with the same techniques and objectives.

In 1980, Patrick was paid US$27,000 (roughly $106,000 after accounting for inflation) to carry out the deprogramming of Susan Wirth, a 35-year-old teacher living in San Francisco. He was hired by her parents, who objected to her involvement with activist groups: the "Coalition to Fight the Death Penalty" and the "African People's Solidarity Committee". The process involved four deprogrammers (or "thugs" as Wirth called them) shoving her into a van and gagging her, after which she was handcuffed to a bed for two weeks, denied food and water, and repeatedly threatened. She was later released and after returning to San Francisco spoke out against deprogramming but declined to press legal charges against her parents or Patrick.

=== Deprogramming fees ===
In his 1976 book Let Our Children Go!, Patrick gives his average fee as US$1,500 (roughly $8,000 after accounting for inflation) per deprogramming, which he says was mainly for expenses. In a 1978 lawsuit against him, he testified that his average fees for a deprogramming were between $2,000 and $5,000. In a 1979 interview he gave a $10,000-per-deprogramming figure (roughly $44,000 after accounting for inflation).

== Civil and criminal proceedings involving Patrick ==
Some criminal proceedings against Patrick have resulted in felony convictions for kidnapping and unlawful imprisonment resulting from his deprogramming efforts.

In February 1973, Daniel Voll of Farmington, Connecticut, summoned Ted Patrick to New York City Criminal Court on assault charges for a botched attempt to deprogram him from the New Testament Ministry Fellowship, part of the burgeoning Jesus Movement. Voll alleged that on 29 January 1973, while walking to his apartment in uptown New York City, he was abducted by his parents and Patrick. On 13 February 1973, Voll pressed assault charges against Patrick, of which he was acquitted.

In May 1974, Patrick held Dena Thomas Jones and Kathy Markis against their wills with some of their acquaintances in Denver because they were believed to be controlled by a "satanic group." District Court Judge Zita Weinshienk sentenced Patrick to a seven-day jail term and a US$1,000 fine (approximately $6,500 now) in June 1974 in order to teach him he "can't play God or the law". However, the Evening Independent (St. Petersburg, Florida) reported that he received an eight-month sentence for this incident.

In December 1974, Patrick was acquitted of kidnapping charges in Seattle, Washington. Kathe Crampton, who called herself Dedication Israel after joining the Love Family, was brought to San Diego from Seattle to be deprogrammed by Patrick and her parents in 1973. She broke free and returned to Seattle where she sued Patrick for false imprisonment, but Judge Walter T. McGovern absolved Patrick, comparing his situation to a person rushing into a street to save a child from oncoming traffic.

In January 1975, Wendy Helander alleged that Patrick attempted to deprogram her from the Unification Church for fourteen hours straight after her parents tricked her into coming to a house in northern Connecticut. According to her, the deprogramming session only ended after signing an affidavit stating she was willing to be forcibly removed from the Unification Church if she were to return. A tape was played to Judge James Belson of the Washington D.C. Superior Court on 21 August 1975, where psychiatrist Harold Kaufman recorded a conversation with Helander about her experience with Patrick and her parents in January.

In May 1975, Patrick was convicted of holding Joanne Rogin Bradley, a 19-year-old convert to the International Society for Krishna Consciousness (ISKCON), against her will in Orange County, California. In May 1976, Patrick failed to appeal the conviction in the Orange County Superior Court. He was sentenced to one year in prison in June 1976.

In June 1976, Long Beach, New Jersey, authorities charged Patrick with false imprisonment of Richard and Alan Mezey who converted to the Divine Light Mission.

On 3 March 1978, Jessica Marks, a member of the Church of Scientology, filed a lawsuit naming 13 defendants, including Patrick, in a deprogramming incident in Portland, Oregon, in June 1976. Peter Rudie, a lawyer named as a defendant, claimed that Patrick was not part of the conversation that took place in June 1976 and that he was not in Portland at the time.

In 1978, Leslie Weiss pressed the charges of assault, battery, and false imprisonment against Patrick and Albert Turner, who assisted in the attempted deprogramming of Weiss on Thanksgiving Day 1974. Weiss converted to the Unification Church in June 1974. The United States District Court for the District of Rhode Island Judge Francis J. Boyle found no wrongdoing on behalf of the defendants.

According to a habeas corpus petition filed by Pittsburgh attorney Joseph Bonistall in March 1979, Daniel Eyink was abducted by his parents and Patrick from a Cincinnati restaurant where he worked and held in California, in order to be deprogrammed from an unnamed religious community in Cincinnati. Eyink's parents sought to gain custody of their son through a conservatorship. Eyink spoke to Judge Maurice B. Cohill who concluded that Eyink was in the community through his own free will and ended the custody battle in May 1979.

In May 1979 Patrick, along with Marti Schumacher of Vancouver, Washington, was charged with second-degree kidnapping after attempting to convince Schumacher's daughter Janet Cannefax to divorce her husband of approximately seven months, Charles Cannefax. The attempt failed and Janet Cannefax brought charges against them, but Patrick and Schumacher were acquitted.

In July 1980, Patrick and others were charged with conspiracy, kidnapping, and false imprisonment. Paula Dain, a 24-year-old Scientologist, testified against Patrick in Los Angeles, California, in early July 1980. Dain claimed she was kidnapped by Patrick and the other defendants in order to deprogram her from the Church of Scientology. A California jury cleared Patrick of charges in August 1980. Dain and the Church of Scientology later sued Patrick for US$30 million.

In August 1980, Patrick was convicted of conspiracy, kidnapping, and false imprisonment. These charges were related to the abduction and attempted deprogramming of Roberta McElfish, a 26-year-old Tucson waitress, who joined the "Wesley Thomas Family". Patrick was convicted and sentenced to one year in prison and fined US$5,000 (approximately $18,000 now). Patrick failed to appeal the conviction in 1982 in the California Supreme Court. In 1985, he was found guilty of violating probation in relation to his conviction in 1980, and he was sentenced to three years in prison.

In October 1981, Stephanie Riethmiller was abducted by two men while walking to her Cincinnati apartment with her roommate and significant other, Patty Thiemann. Thieman was sprayed with mace and the two men forced Riethmiller into a van where she encountered her father, William Riethmiller. Her parents were seeking to "deprogram" her from her lesbian relationship with Thiemann. Stephanie was driven to Cedar Bluff, Alabama, where, according to her testimony, she was held against her will by James Anthony Roe and Naomi Faye Kelley Goss. Patrick had referred Goss and Roe, a friend of Patrick's son, to Riethmiller's parents. Patrick was on probation when the incident occurred, and Riethmiller's parents paid him US$8,000 (approximately $28,000 now) to organize the deprogramming. According to Riethmiller's testimony, she was held in a cabin for seven days where Goss "harangued" her constantly about the evils of homosexuality, and Roe sexually assaulted her over five successive nights. Authorities brought charges of assault, abduction, and sexual battery against William and Marita Riethmiller, Patrick, and Roe. The parents were granted immunity in exchange for testifying for the prosecution. Patrick was acquitted. Roe was acquitted of the sexual assault charges but later received a 28 day sentence for assault; the jury was unable to reach a verdict on the abduction charges. Goss was sentenced to 38 days in jail in 1983.

In late 1983, Patrick was found guilty of violating the civil rights of Richard Cooper, a member of the Divine Light Mission. The jury ordered Patrick to pay US$40,000 in punitive damages and US$10,000 in compensatory damages (equivalent to a total of approximately $160,000 now). Patrick was unable to pay the damages immediately due to the years of legal battles.

In 1990, Patrick attempted to deprogram Elma Miller, an Amish woman who had joined a liberal sect. He was hired by her husband to return her to him and the Amish church. Criminal charges of conspiracy were filed against Miller's husband, brother, and two others, but were later dropped on her request to the prosecuting attorney, who decided not to charge Patrick.
