= James Reach =

American playwright (1910–1970)

James Reach (1910 – 5 March 1970) was an American playwright who wrote more than two hundred plays. He was also director of the literary department of Samuel French publishers. He often adapted television and radio shows for the stage, and although he is not well-known, his plays are sought after by smaller repertory companies.

Reach's work includes Dragnet, in 1956, which was performed by Theatreport in Houston. Reach also wrote plays based on Brett Halliday's Michael Shayne mysteries, Murder is My Business and Murder Over Miami. Other works by Reach include One Mad Night, Danger from the Sky, You, The Jury and We're All Guilty. Reach also wrote seven suspense novels.

Reach died of a heart attack on 5 March 1970, aged 60.
