= Freewill Shakespeare Festival =

Canadian Shakespeare Festival

The Freewill Shakespeare Festival (known as the River City Shakespeare Festival from 1998–2009) is produced by The Free Will Players Theatre Guild (FWP) in Edmonton and is one of the longest running outdoor Shakespeare Festivals in Canada. FWP was formed as a not-for-profit theatre company in 1989 by a group of seven recent graduates of the U of A in a truly cooperative, pass-the-hat spirit with the mandate to produce the works of William Shakespeare. Since then, FWP has grown to an organization that employs over 50 artists, administrators, and support staff at the height of the summer season of plays and has drawn over 250,000 people to its productions. In addition, the summer season down at the Heritage Amphitheatre in Hawrelak Park also has over 150 volunteers assisting with the afternoon and evening shows and special events. These volunteers put in over 4000 hours each summer.

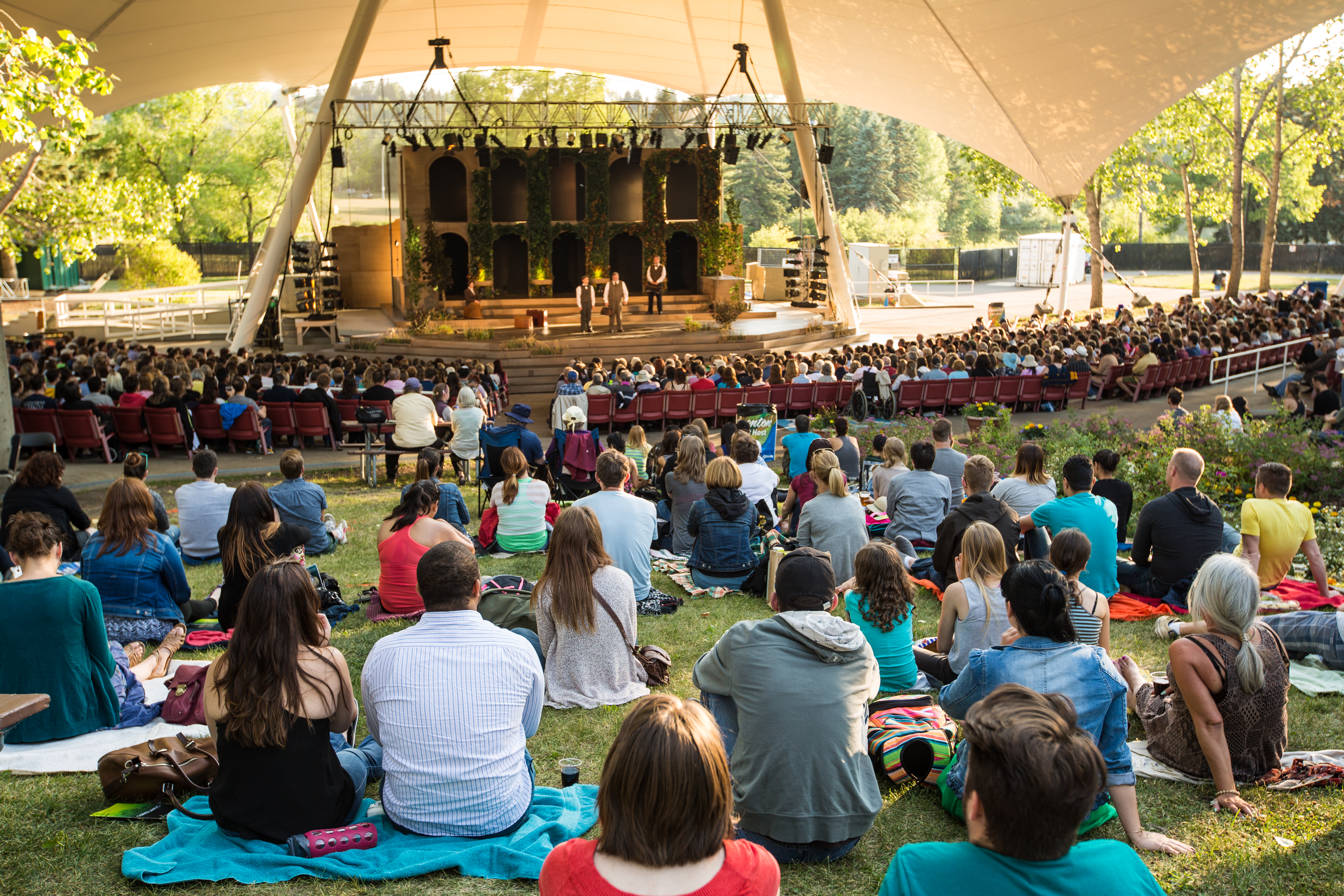
The set for As You Like It and Coriolanus for Freewill Shakespeare Festival in 2015

FWP’s seasons consist of two fully realized Shakespearean productions that play in repertory over 4 weeks from late June to late July. Productions boast contemporary interpretations of setting, theme, and character to best communicate the plays ideas for a modern audience. Some seasons have also included ancillary events such as an off-site secondary production, guest productions, puppet shows, and Camp Shakespeare. FWP endeavours to make the productions accessible to all audiences, regardless of age, ability, education or income levels, while also developing new audiences and mentoring theatre professionals of the future. In the spirit of the original artists’ ‘pass the hat’ philosophy FWP continues encouraging audiences with Pay-What-You-Will and special pricing for students and seniors.

Due to significant damage to Freewill's traditional venue at the Heritage Amphitheatre, the festival's 2014 season took place inside the Myer Horowitz Theatre in the University of Alberta's Students' Union Building (8900 114 Street).

In 2023 the festival was required move from the venerable Hawrelak Park Heritage Amphitheatre, which has been its home since its founding due to the City of Edmonton's Rehabilitation Project. The 2023 festival was produced inside and around a vintage Spiegeltent set up in the Edmonton Expo Centre parking lot.

The 2024 season will see the Freewill Shakespeare festival set up in four different community leagues across Edmonton, from June 18 to July 14, 2024.

== Recent productions ==
Year	Tragedy	Comedy	Season
2023	Romeo and Juliet	Twelfth Night	August 8 - September 3
2022	Measure for Measure	A Midsummer Night's Dream	June 14 – July 10
2021	Macbeth	Much Ado About Nothing	August 10 - 29 (travelling shows on-demand)
2019	The Winter's Tale	The Two Gentlemen of Verona	June 18 – July 14
2018	Hamlet	The Comedy of Errors	June 19 – July 15
2017	Merchant of Venice	The Merry Wives of Windsor	June 20 – July 16
2016	Romeo and Juliet	Love's Labour's Lost	June 21 – July 17
2015	Coriolanus	As You Like It	June 23 – July 19
2014	cancelled	The Taming of the Shrew	
2013	King Lear	A Midsummer Night's Dream	
2012	Julius Caesar	The Tempest	June 26 - July 22
2011	Othello	Twelfth Night	June 30 - July 24
2010	Macbeth	Much Ado About Nothing	
2009	Titus Andronicus	The Comedy of Errors	June 30 - July 26
2008	Richard III	As You Like It	June 24 - July 20
2007	Two Gents (musical)	The Winter's Tale	
2006	Hamlet	The Taming of the Shrew	
2005	Romeo and Juliet	Love's Labour's Lost	
2004	The Merchant of Venice	Twelfth Night	
2003	Henry V	A Midsummer Night's Dream	
2002	The Tempest	The Merry Wives of Windsor	
2001	Richard III	As You Like It	
2000	King Lear	Much Ado About Nothing	
1999	Macbeth	The Two Gentlemen of Verona	
1998	Julius Caesar	The Comedy of Errors	
