= Tom Dulack =

American playwright and professor

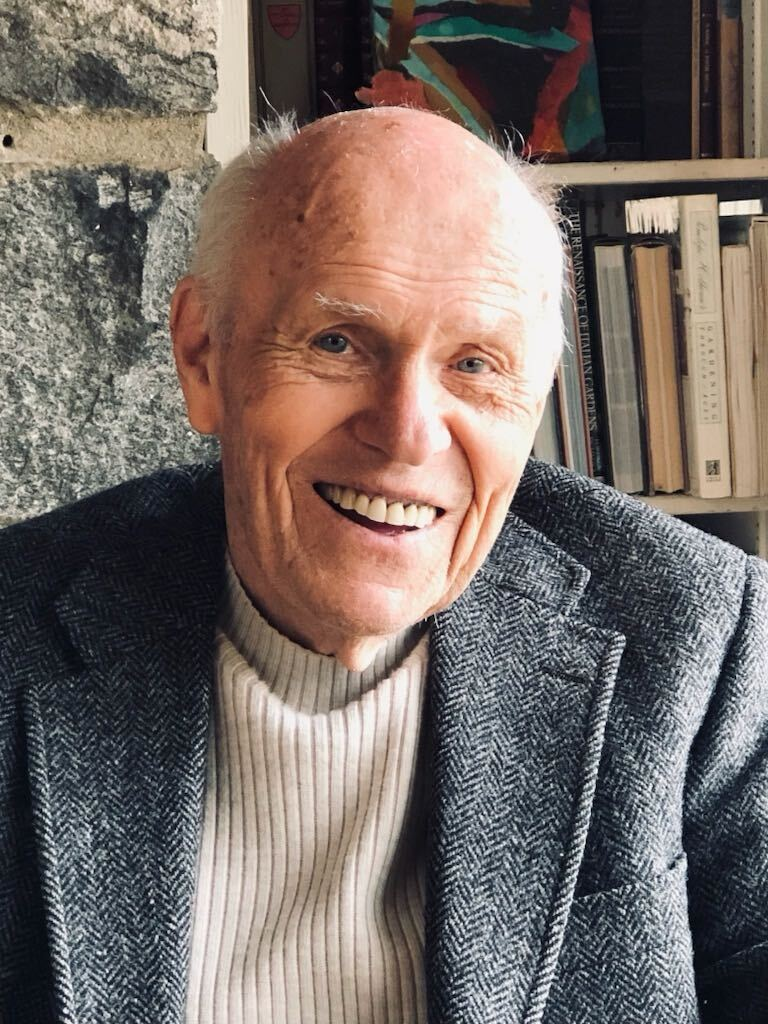
- Tom Dulack
- Born: 1937 (age 88–89)
- Occupation: Playwright

Thomas Dulack (born 1936 in Whiting, Indiana) is an American playwright, novelist, director, and English professor. His works include Incommunicado, Breaking Legs, and Solomon’s Child.

== Novels and plays ==
His first professional play, Solomon's Child, was held over at the Long Wharf Theatre in New Haven, Connecticut, before transferring to Broadway. It was then transferred to a French-language production and a television adaptation in Brussels, Belgium. His drama Incommunicado, about Ezra Pound, won the Kennedy Center Award for New American Plays.

Breaking Legs had its world premiere with Jack O'Brien directing at the Old Globe Theatre in San Diego in 1989. It was nominated as best new play by the San Diego Critics Circle. It ran for 447 performances at the Promenade Theatre in New York in 1990–91.

Title	Date of Publication	Novel/Play
Incommunicado	Produced-1989, Published-1998	Play
Friends Like These		Play
Breaking Legs	Produced-1991, Published-1992	Play
Diminished Capacity		Play
Solomon's Child		Play
Nudes Descending		Play
The Misanthropes	2014	Novel-as-screenplay
Let Our Children Go!	1976	Novel
The Stigmata of Dr. Constantine	1975	Novel
Pork; or, The day I lost the masters	1968	Play
The Vantage Ground	1970	Novel
In Love With Shakespeare: A Literary Memoir	2001	Theatre memoir
The Road to Damascus	2015	Novel
The Vantage Ground		Novel
1348	1999	Play
Just Deserts		Play
End of the Century		Play
Shooting Craps		Play
Francis		Play
The Elephant and Mrs. Rossetti		Play
My Country and The Road to Damascus		Play
Capital Crimes		Play
Bright Wings		Play
Catherine		Play
Miserere	October 2024	Novel
A Paradise Lost		Play
