= Scapini =

Scapini is an Italian surname. Notable people with the surname include:

- Franco Scapini (born 1962), Italian racing driver
- Georges Scapini (1893–1976), French lawyer and politician
- Mario Scapini
- Matteo Scapini (born 1983), Italian footballer

== See also ==
- Rafinha (Rafael Scapini De Almeida)
