= Einstein's Gift =

2003 play by Vern Thiessen

- 2nd edition cover (Playwrights Canada Press)
- Written by: Vern Thiessen
- Characters: Albert Einstein; Dr. Fritz Haber; Otto; Deacon Auffarth; Clara Immerwahr; Peterson; Deimling; Soldier; Singer; Lotta Haber; Bernhard Rust; Gestapo
- Original language: English
- Setting: Germany; 1905-1945

Premiere
- Date premiered: 2003
- Place premiered: Citadel Theatre; Edmonton, Alberta

Einstein's Gift is a 2003 play written by Canadian playwright Vern Thiessen and published in 2003 by Playwrights Canada Press. Through the recollections of Albert Einstein, the play focuses on the life and career of German chemist Dr. Fritz Haber, who helped improve living conditions with his work on nitrogen fixation. His work was later used by the German army to produce the chlorine gas used in the Second Battle of Ypres in the First World War. As Dr. Haber becomes increasingly involved with the German army, the play depicts how his actions and newly forged military connections affect his relationship with his wife, Clara, and his assistant, Otto. As his passion for science intertwines with nationalistic pride, Haber manifests himself as a scientist devoted to a country that never accepted his Jewish origin.

== Topic ==
Einstein's Gift is a memory play that loosely recounts the life of Dr. Fritz Haber from 1905 until his death in 1934. The play is presented as the memories of Albert Einstein as he looks back upon Haber's life. Through the interactions of Einstein, Haber, Haber's two wives, scientific colleagues and political and military minders, it addresses the connections between pure and applied science, faith and nationalism, and imagination and knowledge. Fritz Haber was a Nobel Laureate and German chemist. Haber converted from Judaism to Christianity to help further his scientific career as even at that time in Germany there existed discrimination against Jewish people. He was the co-inventor of the Haber–Bosch process. The process, used to make ammonia, revolutionized the production of agricultural fertilizer. This invention helped to prevent the starvation of millions of people. However, he was also involved in the use of chlorine gas by the German military. This gas was used in as a weapon in Ypres during World War I. Haber's lab also developed the cyanide-based pesticide Zyklon A, predecessor to the infamous Zyklon B.

The first act works to develop the meaningful yet complicated relationship between the characters Einstein and Haber, drawing upon the dynamic differences between both their scientific and moral principles. Morals that are discussed between (Albert) Einstein and Haber during this act include nationality, religion/faith, and what it means to change these factors in one's life; for example, Haber does not fully embrace Christianity, but is baptized so that he can increase his chances of gaining professorship. Haber's decision to get a baptism is motivated by his career goals. This not only demonstrates his devotion to science, but also his ambition to acquire fame and recognition as a scientist.

Very early on, it is established that Einstein and Haber are each other's foil, both with a very different outlook on life and the future of science. While Einstein does not care much for his nationality and cultural identity, Haber, who is strongly nationalistic, feels obliged to serve his country. In the opening scene, Haber praises the German education system as "the best in the world", while Einstein retorts that being a German born and raised was "no privilege for [him]", detesting the structure and interconnecting the differing stances the two brilliant scientists have on nationality and scientific belief (Thiessen 10). Their differing views arise later, as the two once again find themselves at odds with each other through their contrasting perspective on the sciences – Haber scoffs at the impracticality of physics, while Einstein views chemistry as unimaginative. Their differing views regarding science's involvement in war create tension between the pacifist Albert Einstein and the war involved Haber. Haber argued that, if he were to assist the military in the production and utilization of lethal chlorine gas, the war would come to an end sooner due to the gas's effectiveness in trench warfare. Einstein, however, reasoned that science should, under no circumstances, be used for such purposes.

In addition to the discrimination towards religion that is addressed in the play, there is the topic of prejudice towards women in the early twentieth century. Focussing on the scientific community as women began to advance into the many fields of science, it is represented in the play through the chemist and Fritz Haber's wife Clara Immerwahr, the first woman to receive a PhD from the University of Breslau. Clara was also Jewish and of German descent.

Thiessen presents non-stereotypical scientists with varying points of view toward their disciplines: Haber is willing to compromise his faith, the people in his life, and morals to further his career ambitions through practical use of science; Haber's wife Clara practices science to serve the greater good through applications of her work; Einstein believes that science is composed of ideas and imagination; and Otto only wishes to make a difference. In this play, the clash of these scientists’ ideologies is explored through their relationships. On one hand, Haber's views differ with his assistant, Otto, who, in act one, is portrayed as an idealistic young man who truly believes that science will yield a better future, and desires no power or recognition for his efforts; Haber, on the other hand, issues a command, by order of General Deimling of the German Army, to release chlorine gas, causing the death of several enemy soldiers, fearing he would be stripped of his precious titles and posting if he did not comply. Haber's drive to advance his career by developing chemical warfare also places a great deal of strain on his relationship with his wife, Clara Immerwahr. Clara and Haber both believe in the practical application of science. But, Clara is more interested in serving "greater humanity" while Haber is more concerned with helping his own country, furthering his career and, in Clara's eyes, gaining recognition. This causes Clara to constantly challenge Haber. Through her arguments and criticisms, Clara displays how Haber has become overly obsessed with being accepted by a country that, as she puts it, will never see him as a "real German."

In the ending scene of Act 1, Haber along with Colonel Peterson and General Deimling release chlorine gas in Ypres to "create havoc." Haber is hoping that the release of chlorine gas will bring the war to an abrupt halt; however, Deimling disregards Haber's strategy and orders him to release it without "full reserves." Haber listens to General Deimling due to his flaw of searching for fame and recognition. Otto, Haber's assistant, notices that Haber will do whatever it takes to further his career even if that involves murdering other men. This is supported by Deimling's comment: "Well done, Haber. I'm sure a promotion to captain will be in order..." After the chlorine gas is released, Haber sees firsthand the mass murder he has caused in order to be famous. His actions not only astonished him at the atrocity that took place but also lead to his wife committing suicide. She killed herself because she felt betrayed by her husband, and could not live with the knowledge that her husband had used the scientific processes in which they had created together for evil rather than for the original purpose of establishing a more productive society.

In the second to last scene during Act 2, Einstein shares with Haber his opinion about the differences in their own respective approaches to life and science. Einstein explains how he is undeserving compared to Haber because he has "[kept] a safe distance from life" and lived inside himself, whereas Haber "struggled with the world" and is therefore more deserving of recognition, praise and respect.

In his play, Einstein’s Gift, Theissen explores theme balance between career ambition and morals; faith and nationality; and practicality and imagination; by juxtaposing two brilliant scientists with opposing points of view toward their common discipline, Theissen demonstrates that both scientists’ lack of balance leads to their downfall.

In the 2005 production by The Gateway Theatre and Firehall Theatre the set consists of a number of platforms with various mathematical equations covering them.

== Cast ==
The characters have been played by various actors in different productions:

- Einstein: Shawn Elliott, James MacDonald
- Haber: Ron Halder; Aasif Mandvi
- Clara: Kathleen Duborg; Melissa Friedman
- Lotta (Haber's second wife): Sarah Donald
- Otto (Haber's assistant): Daniel Arnold

== Crew ==
The crew positions have been occupied by different people in different productions:

- Writer: Vern Thiessen
- Director: Donna Spencer; Ron Russell, David Storch
- Choreographer: Michel Guimond
- Fight choreographer: Nicholas Harrison
- Costume design: Rebekka Sorensen
- Set design: Phillip Tidd, Bretta Gerecke
- Music and sound design: Ted Hamilton
- Lighting: James Proudfoot
- Stage Manager: Angela Beaulieu

== Production ==
The play has been performed at:

- 2003 Citadel Theatre, Edmonton
- 2003 Theatre & Company, Kitchener, Ontario
- 2005 Acorn Theatre, Epic Theatre Centre, New York
- 2005 The Gateway Theatre and Firehall Theatre, British Columbia
- 2011 Carousel Theatre, British Columbia (by Enemies of the Stage)
- Winnipeg Jewish Theatre
- Magnus Theatre
- The Grand Theatre

== Awards ==
- 2003 Alberta Book Award: nominated
- 2003 Governor General's Literary Award: won (drama)
- 2003 Elizabeth Sterling Haynes Award: 5 nominations
- 1999 Canadian Jewish Playwriting Competition: won

== Critical reception ==
The play has seen some success, and, therefore, knows some criticism: the New York Times Theatre Review states that "Science may need less sugar than Mr. Thiessen and the Epic Theatre company suppose"; whereas, Ph.D. Theatre critic Irene Backalenick says for www.Jewish-theatre.com "Einstein's Gift is a gift to us all."
