= Alexander McAllister =

Scottish cricketer (1920–2008)

Personal information
- Full name: Alexander Eric McAllister
- Born: 19 December 1920; Paisley, Renfrewshire, Scotland
- Died: 29 January 2008 (aged 87); Sunningdale, Berkshire, England
- Source: Cricinfo, 5 November 2019

Alexander Eric McAllister (19 December 1920 – 29 January 2008) was a Scottish cricketer, who played one first-class match for the Scotland cricket team in 1950. McAllister played his domestic cricket for Clydesdale Cricket Club in Glasgow, captaining the team from 1950 to 1952. McAllister died in Sunningdale, Berkshire, England on 29 January 2008, at the age of 87.
