= Daryl Cloran =

Canadian theatre director

- Born: July 30, 1974 (age 51); Sarnia, Ontario, Canada
- Occupation: Director
- Spouse: Holly Lewis
- Children: 2

Daryl Cloran (born July 30, 1974) is a Canadian theatre director and, currently, the artistic director of the Citadel Theatre in Edmonton, Alberta. Formally the artistic director of Western Canada Theatre, in Kamloops, British Columbia, Canada, he took over as the artistic director of Citadel Theatre in Edmonton, AB, Canada, succeeding Bob Baker, in September 2016.

== Childhood and Education ==
Born and raised in Sarnia, Ontario, Daryl Cloran completed his bachelor's degree in theatre and education at Queen's University in Kingston, Ontario, where he graduated with the Lorne Greene Award for outstanding achievement in practical and performing aspects of theatre . In 1999, he completed the CFC Media Lab Program, a training institute for interactive and digital creators at the Canadian Film Centre.

He also studied film at the New York Film Academy.

== Career ==
=== Theatre Work ===
Prior to helming Western Canada Theatre, Cloran was the Founding Artistic Director of Theatrefront, an independent Toronto theatre company where he directed: The Mill (four Dora Awards, winning one for Outstanding Production); fforward (2 Dora nominations); the critically acclaimed Our Country's Good (2 Dora nominations);Swimming in the Shallows; The Underpants; Mojo; Sweet Phoebe; and I Might Be Edgar Allan Poe. Most notable of Cloran's work with Theatrefront are the international collaborations, Return (The Sarajevo Project) and Ubuntu (The Cape Town Project). The critically acclaimed Return (The Sarajevo Project) was created and produced in Bosnia and Toronto by a company of Bosnian and Canadian artists. It garnered five Dora nominations and was published by Playwrights Press Canada. Ubuntu (The Cape Town Project) was collectively created by Daryl Cloran and an ensemble of Canadian and South African artists. It is a bilingual work combining physical and text-based theatre. It was also published by Playwrights Canada Press. Developed in Toronto and Cape Town, it was produced in South Africa, Halifax, western Canada and Toronto.

Daryl Cloran has directed at theatres across Canada and internationally, including: Love's Labour's Lost (Bard on the Beach) which he adapted to critical and audience acclaim; Liberation Days (Theatre Calgary, which garnered seven Betty Mitchell Award nominations under his direction); the Canadian premiere of Peter and the Starcatcher (Western Canada Theatre); the world premiere of And All For Love (National Arts Centre); the world premiere of Michael Healey's Generous (Tarragon Theatre); Afterplay (Shaw Festival); The Last Five Years (Canadian Stage and Manitoba Theatre Centre - four Dora Nominations); Educating Rita (Theatre Aquarius); This is How it Goes (Neptune Theatre); A New Brain (Acting Upstage - four Dora Nominations, including for Best Director); Helen's Necklace (Grand Theatre, London); and The Play About The Baby (Soulpepper Theatre Company).

Daryl Cloran's first regional artistic directorship was with Theatre and Company in Kitchener-Waterloo. Next, Daryl took on the role of New Play Development Coordinator at the Stratford Shakespeare Festival where he also worked as assistant director to Artistic Director Des McAnuff. He was invited back for a second season before being offered and accepting the job as artistic director at Western Canada Theatre. In those two seasons, he assisted on Caesar and Cleopatra and A Funny Thing Happened on the Way to the Forum.

A drummer himself, Daryl Cloran got a chance to craft the musical spectacular, Drum!. Originally directed by Tim French, Cloran took over, helming the work as it toured across North America. He designed a touring version for the 2010 Winter Olympics, and a subsequent showcase at Dollywood.

=== Film Work ===
After completing his training at the Canadian Film Centre, Daryl Cloran cofounded Trapeze Media, a digital production studio, dedicated to developing interactive digital entertainment, while continuing to direct live theatre.

Along with Anita Doran and Mateo Guez, Daryl Cloran co-wrote and directed the interactive film, Late Fragment. Each filmmaker took on the creation of one third of the film while working together, with the assistance of Producer Ana Serrano, to weave the story lines and build the structure through which audiences would navigate the film. Late Fragment premiered at the Toronto International Film Festival in 2007. Recognized as North America's first interactive film, it was produced by the Canadian Film Centre and the National Film Board of Canada.

He also directed the short film P.M.O., which premiered at the Worldwide Short Film Festival.

== Teaching ==
Although he has said his teaching degree from Queens University was something he took to fall back on, Daryl Cloran has taught at the University of Waterloo and Queen's University (where he directed a modern adaptation of Chekhov's Three Sisters as well as an inventively staged Macbeth). He took on the notoriously unstageable Peer Gynt with the graduating class at George Brown Theatre School. He has also held teaching positions at Fanshawe College, Sheridan College and Armstrong Acting Studio, founded by Canadian screen actor Dean Armstrong offering classes for professional actors.

== Personal life ==
In 2004, Cloran married Canadian stage and screen actress Holly Lewis. They moved from Toronto in 2010 to Kamloops BC and then to Edmonton, where they live with their two sons.

== Awards ==
John Hirsch Prize for Outstanding Emerging Theatre Director from the Canada Council for the Arts

Toronto Theatre Emerging Artist Award

Robert Merritt Award for Outstanding Direction

Kamloops Business Magazine's Top 10 Under 40
