= Vern Thiessen =

Canadian playwright (born c. 1964)

Vern Thiessen (born c. 1964) is a Canadian playwright.

Born in Winnipeg, Manitoba, Thiessen studied at the University of Winnipeg and graduated with a Bachelor of Arts. He later attended the University of Alberta, where he obtained a Master of Fine Arts degree.

Thiessen previously lived in Edmonton, Alberta, and was formerly a drama instructor at the University of Alberta. He is a past president of both the Playwrights Guild of Canada and the Writers' Guild of Alberta.

Thiessen is the recipient of numerous awards, including the Governor General's Award for English-language drama (Einstein's Gift), the Carol Bolt Award for Best Play (Vimy) and the Sterling Award for Outstanding New Play (Apple). He has also received the City of Edmonton Arts Achievement Award and the Alumni Award of Excellence from the University of Alberta. He has been nominated several times for other awards including the Siminovitch Prize in Theatre, and was a finalist for the Governor General's Award for Lenin's Embalmers.

Thiessen's work has been translated into several languages including German, French, Polish, and Hebrew. His plays are performed regularly in Canada, the United States, the UK, and Europe. He has also been produced in Australia and Asia. Shakespeare's Will has been produced twice at Canada's Stratford Festival. Lenin's Embalmers, A More Perfect Union, and Einstein's Gift have been produced Off-Broadway.

Thiessen has served as playwright in residence at the Citadel Theatre and Workshop West Theatre in Edmonton. He is currently an associate artist at Epic Theatre Ensemble. He is also project associate for the New Play Frontiers program at People's Light at Theatre in Malvern, Pennsylvania.

Thiessen is currently at work on several commissions for the Ensemble Studio Theatre (New York), Touchstone Theatre/Patrick Street (Vancouver), Soulpepper Theatre Company (Toronto) and Epic Theatre Ensemble (New York). His plays are published by Playwrights Canada Press.

From 2007 until 2014, he lived in New York City. He is married to novelist Susie Moloney.

Vern served as artistic director of Work Shop West Theatre in Edmonton beginning in 2014.

In 2014, he won the Dora Mavor Moore Award for Outstanding New Play for his theatrical adaptation of W. Somerset Maugham's novel Of Human Bondage.

== Theatrical works ==
- 1987: The Courier
- 1990: The Resurrection of John Frum
- 1996: Blowfish
- 2002: Apple
- 2003: Einstein's Gift
- 2005: Shakespeare's Will
- 2006: Back to Berlin
- 2007: Vimy
- 2007: Bird Brain
- 2007: Rich (with composer Olaf Pyttlik)
- 2009: A More Perfect Union
- 2010: Lenin's Embalmers
- 2011: The Last Tree of Rapa Nui (with composer Olaf Pyttlik)
- 2012: Do Not Disturb
- 2014: Of Human Bondage (adaptation)
- 2019: Pugwash
- 2022: Bluebirds
- 2023: Icemen
