= Western Canada Theatre =

Theatre company in British Columbia, Canada

Coordinates: 50.66627°N 120.31966°W

- Formation: 1975
- Type: Theatre group
- Location: Kamloops, British Columbia
- Artistic director: Kelli Fox
- Website: www.wctlive.ca

Western Canada Theatre is a professional theatre company located in Kamloops, British Columbia, Canada. It was founded in 1975 by Tom Kerr under the name Western Canada Youth Theatre.

It currently offers seven live performances throughout the season; five mainstage and two alternative/experimental productions. The season runs from September to May each year.

The company manages and performs in two spaces: Sagebrush Theatre, a 681-seat proscenium theatre, and Pavilion Theatre, a 150-seat black box theatre space. Sagebrush Theatre is the company's mainstage performance space while Pavilion Theatre is the site of the smaller productions. Sagebrush Theatre is owned by the Kamloops School District, leased by the City of Kamloops, and managed by WCT.

The current artistic director is Kelli Fox. Previous artistic directors include Tom Kerr, Frank Glassen, David Ross, Michael Dobbin, John Cooper, Jeremy Tow, Daryl Cloran, and James MacDonald.
