= Citadel Theatre =

Theatre in Edmonton, Alberta, Canada

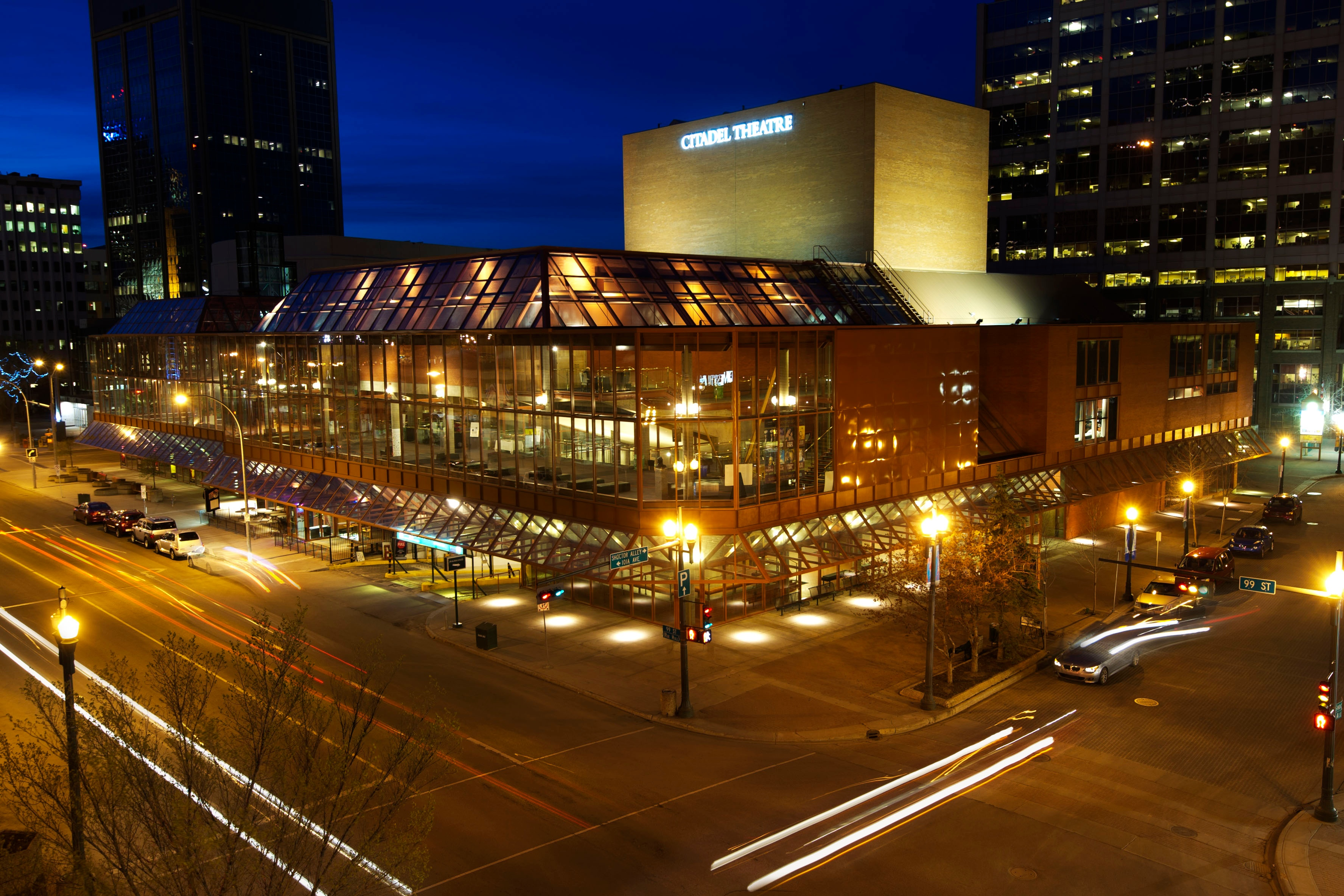
- Exterior view of venue c. 2012
- Interactive map of Citadel Theatre
- Address: 9828 101A Avenue NW; Edmonton, Alberta; T5J 3C6
- Coordinates: 53°32′33″N 113°29′18″W
- Capacity: 20 (Lee Pavilion); 90 (Tucker Amphitheatre); 215 (Zeidler Hall); 250 (The Club at Citadel); 651 (Shoctor Theatre); 705 (Maclab Theatre)
- Public transit: Churchill station

Construction
- Opened: November 10, 1965
- Years active: 1965–present
- Architect: Barton Myers

Website
- citadeltheatre.com

The Citadel Theatre is the major venue for theatre arts in the city of Edmonton, Alberta, Canada, located in the city's downtown core on Churchill Square. It is the third largest regional theatre in Canada.

== History ==
It began in a former Salvation Army Citadel, on 102 Street, bought by Joseph H. Shoctor, James L. Martin, Ralph B. MacMillan, and Sandy Mactaggart and was incorporated as a local nonprofit organization. The theatre's first production to be performed was Who's Afraid of Virginia Woolf?. The theatre was founded on October 12, 1965 with its first opening night on November 10, 1965. In its current location, The Citadel has the distinction of being the only venue where the Jule Styne musical Pieces of Eight has been produced.

The organization moved to its current building just off Churchill Square in 1976. Construction lasted just under two years, and the new Citadel Theatre complex officially opened on November 12, 1976. Architect Barton Myers designed the structure. The building houses the Maclab, Shoctor, and Rice Theatres, Zeidler Hall, the Tucker Amphitheatre, and the Foote Theatre School. In addition to the three theatres, seating 650, 240 and 220 people, and a lobby accommodating 1000 people, the Citadel Theatre also includes an art gallery, a lounge and a restaurant. The architecture of the building is critically examined by Banafsheh Mohammadi and is described as "a waterfall of glass," constructed of glass panels that "cover roughly 60 percent of the 90,000 square feet of the building's exterior."

The Maclab and Tucker are part of the Lee Pavilion, in the middle of Edmonton.

== Queer History ==
The Citadel Theatre has been a supportive ally to Edmonton's 2SLGBTQ+ community. The theatre has been the workplace of three gay Artistic Directors, and has staged many productions written by queer playwrights.

Who's Afraid of Virginia Woolf? written by the gay playwright Edward Albee was the first production put on by The Citadel Theatre in 1965, three years after the play's Broadway debut in 1962.

The Citadel Theatre has produced many plays with queer themes such as The Glass Menagerie, Hosanna, Kiss of the Spider Woman, and The Gay Heritage Project. In their 60th anniversary season, the Citadel will produce Casey and Diana by Nick Green.

In 2006, The Citadel Theatre hosted their first Queer Prom event. In 2009, the annual event drew more than 100 youth to the theatre to celebrate the end of their school year.

== Artistic directors ==
- John Hulburt (1965-1966)
- Robert Glenn (1966-1968)
- Sean Mulcahy (1968-1973)
- John Neville (1973-1978)
- Peter Coe (1978-1981)
- Joseph H. Shoctor (1981-1984, as Producer)
- Gordon McDougall (1984-1987)
- William Fisher (1987-1989)
- Richard Dennison (1989-1990, as Producer)
- Robin Phillips (1990-1995, as Director General)
- Duncan McIntosh (1995-1999)
- Bob Baker (director) (1999–2016)
- Daryl Cloran (2016 - )

== Productions ==
2025—2026 Production Season

Legally Blonde — Music and lyrics by Laurence O'Keefe and Nell Benjamin and Book by Heather Hach

Life of Pi — Based on the novel by Yann Martel, adapted for the stage by Lolita Chakrabarti

Vinyl Cafe: The Musical — Based on the Vinyl Cafe Stories by Stuart McLean, With Songs by Colleen Dauncey and Akiva Romer-Segal, Adapted for the Stage by Georgina Escobar

Death of a Salesman — By Arthur Miller

The Wizard of Oz — By L. Frank Baum, With Music and Lyrics by Harold Arlen and E.Y. Harburg

Casey and Diana — By Nick Green, Directed by Lana Michelle Hughes

Cyrano de Bergerac — By Edmond Rostand, Adapted by Jessy Ardern

Big Stuff — Written and Created by Matt Baram & Naomi Snieckus, Co-Created and Directed by Kat Sandler

Burning Mom — Written and Directed by Mieko Ouchi

Holiday Presentations

A Christmas Carol — By David van Belle, Based on the novel by Charles Dickens

Bear Grease (Holiday Special) — A LightningCloud production
