= Canadian Stage production history =

The Canadian Stage Company is based in Toronto, and is Canada's third-largest not-for-profit contemporary theatre company. Founded in 1987 with the merger of CentreStage and Toronto Free Theatre, Canadian Stage is dedicated to programming international contemporary theatre and to developing and producing Canadian works.

As of 2026, the following is a chronological list of the productions which have been staged as part of Canadian Stage since its inception.

== 1987–1988 ==
- Glengarry Glen Ross – by David Mamet
- B-Movie, the play – by Tom Wood
- Nothing Sacred – by George F. Walker
- Jitters – by David French
- The Tempest – by William Shakespeare

== 1988–1989 ==
- Woyzeck – by Georg Büchner
- A Map of the World – by David Hare
- Donut City – by Douglas Rodger
- Odd Jobs – by Frank Moher
- Hunting Cockroaches – by Janusz Glowacki
- The Threepenny Opera – by Bertolt Brecht and Kurt Weill
- 1949 – by David French
- Yesteryear – by Joanna McClelland Glass
- The Bourgeois Gentlemen – by Molière
- What the Butler Saw – by Joe Orton
- Incognito
- Blood Brothers – by Willy Russell
- Kiss of the Spider Woman – by Manuel Puig
- Valentine Brown – by Susan Cox

== 1989–1990 ==
- Our Country's Good – by Timberlake Wertenbaker
- The Trial of Judith K. – by Sally Clark
- The Show-Off – by George Kelly
- The Legend of Avro Arrow – by Clinton Bomphrey
- Fire – by Paul Ledoux and David Young
- Breaking the Code – by Hugh Whitemore
- The Comedy of Errors – by William Shakespeare
- I.D. – by Antony Sher
- Goodnight Desdemona (Good Morning Juliet) – by Ann-Marie MacDonald
- Almost A Comedy
- The Invention of Poetry – by Paul Quarrington
- The Recruiting Officer – by George Farquhar

== 1990–1991 ==
- Divided We Stand
- Possible Worlds – by John Mighton
- Of the Fields, Lately – by David French
- Speed the Plow – by David Mamet
- The Passion of Narcisse – by Mondoux
- The Importance of Being Earnest – by Oscar Wilde
- The Dreamland – by Raymond Storey and John Roby
- The Comedy of Errors – by William Shakespeare
- La Maison Suspendue – by Michel Tremblay

== 1991–1992 ==
- Avant La Guerre A L'Anse a Gille – by Marie Laberge
- Suits – by Richard Green and Peter Wildman
- Awful Manors – by Ronnie Burkett
- Not Wanted on the Voyage – by Timothy Findley, adapted by D.D. Kugler and Richard Rose
- The Wingfield Trilogy – by Dan Needles
- Singer – by Peter Flannery
- To Grandmother's House We Go – by Joanna Glass
- Tartuffe – by Molière
- Shirley Valentine – by Willy Russell
- As You Like It – by William Shakespeare

== 1992–1993 ==
- Shirley Valentine – by Willy Russell
- Flowers – by Deb Porter
- Blue Dragons – by Gordon Armstrong
- The Queens – by Normand Chaurette
- Wingfield Trilogy – by Dan Needles
- Silver Dagger – by David French
- La Bete – by David Hirson
- Rat Bag – by Martha Ross and John Millard
- Fallen Angels – by Noël Coward
- Richard III – by William Shakespeare
- Edward IV – by William Shakespeare
- Henry VI – by William Shakespeare
- Hour Company – by Collective

== 1993–1994 ==
- Once on This Island – book and lyrics by Lynn Ahrens, music by Stephen Flaherty
- Rough Crossing – by Tom Stoppard
- Twelfth Night – by William Shakespeare
- Death and the Maiden – by Ariel Dorfman
- Dancing at Lughnasa – by Brian Friel
- Homeward Bound – by Elliott Hayes
- If We Are Women – by Joanna McClelland Glass

== 1994–1995 ==
- Oleanna – by David Mamet
- The Wooden Hill – by Don Hannah
- Twelfth Night – by William Shakespeare
- Hay Fever – by Noël Coward
- Poor Superman – by Brad Fraser
- Six Degrees of Separation – by John Guare
- The Monument – by Colleen Wagner
- Transit of Venus – by Maureen Hunter
- Into the Woods – by Stephen Sondheim and James Lapine

== 1995–1996 ==
- Keely and Du – by Jane Martin
- Tinka's New Dress – by Ronnie Burkett
- Dr Jekyll and Mr Hyde - A Love Story – by James W. Nichol
- The Glorious 12th – by Raymond Storey
- Lips Together, Teeth Apart – by Terrence McNally
- A Midsummer Night's Dream – by William Shakespeare
- Hard Hearts – by Elliott Hayes
- Later Life – by A. R. Gurney
- A Little Night Music – lyrics by Stephen Sondheim, book by Hugh Wheeler

== 1996–1997 ==
- Arcadia – by Tom Stoppard
- Angels in America – by Tony Kushner
- Thirteen Hands – by Carol Shields
- Atlantis – by Maureen Hunter
- Private Lives – by Noël Coward
- Passion – by Stephen Sondheim and James Lapine
- A Midsummer Night's Dream – by William Shakespeare

== 1997–1998 ==
- Trainspotting – by Irvine Welsh, adapted by Harry Gibson
- A Delicate Balance – by Edward Albee
- The House of Martin Guerre – by Leslie Arden
- Romeo and Juliet – by William Shakespeare
- Harlem Duet – by Djanet Sears
- Molly Sweeney – by Brian Friel
- Wingfield Bound – by Dan Needles
- Claptrap – by Tom Wood

== 1998–1999 ==
- Mump and Smoot – by Michael Kennard and John Turner
- A Common Man's Guide to Loving Women – by Andrew Moodie
- Stone Angel – by Margaret Laurence
- How I Learned to Drive – by Paula Vogel
- Les Belles Souers – by Michel Tremblay
- Romeo and Juliet – by William Shakespeare
- The Norbals – by Brian Drader
- Billy Bishop Goes to War – by John Gray and Eric Peterson

== 1999–2000 ==
- Heaven – by George F Walker
- Leslie Arden and Friends in Concert – by Leslie Arden
- Street of Blood – by Ronnie Burkett
- Communicating Doors – by Alan Ayckbourn
- Patience – by Jason Sherman
- The Beauty Queen of Leenane – by Martin McDonagh
- For The Pleasure of Seeing Her Again – by Michel Tremblay
- The Overcoat – by Morris Panych and Wendy Gorling
- Rock 'n' Roll – by John Gray

== 2000–2001 ==
- Outrageous – by Brad Fraser and Joey Miller
- Hysteria – by Terry Johnson
- The Weir – by Conor McPherson
- Larry's Party – by Carol Shields, adapted by Richard Ouzounian and Marek Norman
- Happy – by Ronnie Burkett
- Wit – by Margaret Edson
- Closer – by Patrick Marber
- Goodnight Desdemona (Good Morning Juliet) – by Ann-Marie MacDonald
- The Taming of the Shrew – by William Shakespeare

== 2001–2002 ==
- Habitat – by Judith Thompson
- Tillsonburg – by Malachy McKenna
- Picasso at Lapin Agile – by Steve Martin
- The Lonesome West – by Martin McDonagh
- Lost Boys – by R. H. Thompson
- The Edible Woman – novel by Margaret Atwood, adapted by Dave Carley
- Adam Baum and the Jew Movie – by Daniel Goldfarb
- Indian Ink – by Tom Stoppard
- The Tempest – by William Shakespeare

== 2002–2003 ==
- The Shape of Things – by Neil LaBute
- Proof – by David Auburn
- The Beard of Avon – by Amy Freed
- Sunday Father – by Adam Pettle
- Vinci – by Maureen Hunter
- Boy Gets Girl – by Rebecca Gilman
- Sweeney Todd – by Stephen Sondheim
- Rice Boy – by Sunil Kuruvilla
- A Midsummer Night's Dream – by William Shakespeare

== 2003–2004 ==
- Blue/Orange – by Joe Penhall
- Amadeus – by Peter Shaffer
- Cookin' at the Cookery – by Marion J. Caffey
- Provenance – by Ronnie Burkett
- Written on Water – by Michel Marc Bouchard
- The Syringa Tree – by Pamela Gien
- Pélagie – by Vincent de Tourdonnet and Allen Cole
- The Last 5 Years – by Jason Robert Brown
- Urinetown – music by Mark Hollmann, lyrics by Mark Hollmann and Greg Kotis
- Twelfth Night, or What You Will – by William Shakespeare
- The Overcoat – by Morris Panych and Wendy Gorling
- Mosley and Me – by Adam Pettle

== 2004–2005 ==
- Omnium Gatherum – by Theresa Rebeck and Alexandra Gersten-Vassilaros
- Vigil – by Morris Panych
- Side by Side by Sondheim – by Stephen Sondheim
- The Glass Menagerie – by Tennessee Williams
- Take Me Out – by Richard Greenberg
- Unless – by Carol Shields and Sara Cassidy
- My Mother's Feet – by Gina Wilkinson
- Ain't Misbehavin' – by Richard Maltby, Jr.
- Trying – by Joanna Glass
- As You Like It – by William Shakespeare

== 2005–2006 ==
- Habeas Corpus – by Alan Bennett
- The Goat, or Who Is Sylvia? – by Edward Albee
- Crowns – by Regina Taylor
- Homechild – by Joan MacLeod
- A Number – by Caryl Churchill
- Letters From Lehrer – by Richard Greenblatt
- I Am My Own Wife – by Doug Wright
- Hair – book and lyrics by James Rado and Gerome Ragni, music by Galt MacDermot
- 10 Days on Earth – by Ronnie Burkett
- Much Ado About Nothing – by William Shakespeare

== 2006–2007 ==
- Of Mice and Men – by John Steinbeck
- The Story of My Life – music and lyrics by Neil Bartram, book by Brian Hill
- Glorious! – by Peter Quilter
- Half Life – by John Mighton
- What Lies Before Us – by Morris Panych
- The Overcoat – by Morris Panych and Wendy Gorling
- Lucy – by Damien Atkins
- The Rocky Horror Show – by Richard O'Brien
- The Comedy of Errors – by William Shakespeare

== 2007–2008 ==
- The Pillowman – by Martin McDonagh
- The Elephant Man – by Bernard Pomerance
- Little Shop of Horrors – by Howard Ashman and Alan Menken
- The Palace of the End – by Judith Thomson
- The Clean House – by Sarah Ruhl
- Fire – by Paul Ledoux and David Young
- Misery – by Stephen King
- The December Man – by Colleen Murphy
- A Midsummer Night's Dream – by William Shakespeare

== 2008–2009 ==
- Wild Dogs – by Anne Hardcastle
- Frost/Nixon – by Peter Morgan
- It's a Wonderful Life – by Philip Grecian
- Miss Julie: Freedom Summer – by Stephen Sachs
- Blackbird – by David Harrower
- Shirley Valentine – by Willy Russell
- Hardsell – by Daniel Brooks and Rick Miller
- Doubt: A Parable – by John Patrick Shanley
- A Midsummer Night's Dream – by William Shakespeare

== 2009–2010 ==
- Rock'N'Roll – by Tom Stoppard
- 7 Stories – by Morris Panych
- Intimate Apparel – by Lynn Nottage
- 'Art' – by Yasmina Reza
- Frankenstein – by Mary Shelley, adapted by Jonathan Christenson
- That Face – by Polly Stenham
- The Overwhelming – by J. T. Rogers
- This Is What Happens Next – by Daniel MacIvor and Daniel Brooks
- The Tempest – by William Shakespeare

== 2010–11 ==
- Fernando Krapp Wrote Me This Letter – by Tankred Dorst
- The List – by Jennifer Tremblay, translated by Shelley Tepperman
- The Andersen Project – written and directed by Robert Lepage
- Studies in Motion: The Hauntings of Eadweard Muybridge – by Kevin Kerr
- Saint Carmen of the Main – by Michel Tremblay, translated by Linda Gaboriau
- The Middle Place – by Andrew Kushnir
- Spotlight: Italy
- Our Class – by Tadeusz Slobodzianek, English version by Ryan Craig
- The Cosmonaut's Last Message to the Woman He Once Loved in the Former Soviet Union – by David Greig
- Untitled – by Édouard Lock
- Romeo and Juliet – by William Shakespeare

== 2011–2012 ==
- Another Africa: plays from Volcano Theatre's the Africa Trilogy – by Binyavanga Wainaina and Roland Schimmelpfennig
- I Send You This Cadmium Red – music by Gavin Bryars, texts by John Berger and John Christie
- The Test – by Lukas Barfuss
- Orpheus and Eurydice – choreography and direction by Marie Chouinard
- Red – by John Logan
- Cruel and Tender – by Martin Crimp
- Beckett: Feck It! – music directors Dáirine ní Mheadhra and John Hess
- The You Show – by Crystal Pite
- Clybourne Park – by Bruce Norris
- The Game of Love and Chance – by Pierre de Marivaux adapted by Nicolas Billon
- The Winter's Tale – by William Shakespeare

== 2012–2013 ==
- Tear the Curtain! – by Jonathon Young and Kevin Kerr
- Political Mother – choreography, direction and original music by Hofesh Shechter
- Speaking in Tongues – by Andrew Bovell
- The Arsonists – by Max Frisch, translated by Alistair Beaton
- Ignorance – by The Old Trout Puppet Workshop
- Someone Else – by Kristen Thomson
- Spotlight Japan: A Celebration of High-Tech, Contemporary Japanese Theatre and Dance
- This – by Melissa James Gibson
- Race – by David Mamet
- The Golden Mean (Live) – choreographed by Marie Chouinard
- A Midsummer Night's Dream – by William Shakespeare

== 2013–2014 ==
- The Flood Thereafter – by Sarah Berthiaume, translated by Nadine Desrochers
- Venus in Fur – by David Ives
- Yukonstyle – by Sarah Berthiaume, translated by Nadine Desrochers
- DESH – choreographed and performed by Akram Khan
- Winners and Losers – written and performed by Marcus Youssef and James Long
- Needles and Opium – written and directed by Robert Lepage
- London Road – by Alecky Blythe and Adam Cork
- Tribes – by Nina Raine
- Belleville – by Amy Herzog
- The Tempest Replica – choreographed and directed by Crystal Pite
- Macbeth – by William Shakespeare
- The Taming of the Shrew – by William Shakespeare

== 2014–2015 ==
- Kiss and Cry – by Michele Anne De Mey and Jaco Van Dormael
- What Makes A Man – by Jennifer Tarver based on the music of Charles Aznavour
- Helen Lawrence – by Chris Haddock
- Older and Reckless – conceived and curated by Claudia Moore
- Opus – choreographed and staged by Yaron Lifschitz
- Venus in Fur – by David Ives
- The Seagull – by Anton Chekhov
- The Other Place – by Sharr White
- Harper Regan – by Simon Stephens
- Nongogo – by Athol Fugard
- The Meal and Hatched – by Mamela Nyamza
- Ubu and the Truth Commission – by William Kentridge in collaboration with the Handspring Puppet Company
- Dominion – choreographed by Luyanda Sidiya
- Chandelier – by Steven Cohen
- As You Like It – by William Shakespeare
- Titus Andronicus – by William Shakespeare

== 2015–2016 ==
- Beckett Trilogy – by Samuel Beckett
- Julie – composed by Philippe Boesmans with a libretto by Luc Bondy and Marie-Louise Bischofberger
- Domesticated – by Bruce Norris
- Hedda Gabler – by Henrik Ibsen
- Kiss and Cry – by Michele Anne De Mey and Jaco Van Dormael
- Cold Blood – by Michele Anne De Mey and Jaco Van Dormael
- Betroffenheit – by Crystal Pite and Jonathon Young
- Toro – by Akram Khan
- Celebration de la Francophonie – featuring Melissa Laveaux and Lisa LeBlanc
- Chimerica – by Lucy Kirkwood
- Das Ding (the thing) – by Philipp Lohle
- Botticelli in the Fire and Sunday in Sodom – by Jordan Tannahill
- Julius Caesar – by William Shakespeare
- The Comedy of Errors – by William Shakespeare

== 2016–2017 ==
- Concord Floral – by Jordan Tannahill
- All But Gone: A Beckett Rhapsody – featuring short plays by Samuel Beckett
- Constellations – by Nick Payne
- Dollhouse – conceived and choreographed by Bill Coleman
- Who Killed Spalding Gray? – by Daniel MacIvor
- Bosch – choreographed by Marie Chouinard
- Liv Stein – by Nino Haratischwili
- Five Faces for Evelyn Frost – by Guillaume Corbeil
- Cirkopolis – by Cirque Eloize
- Kiss – by Guillermo Calderon
- 887 – by Robert Lepage
- Jack Charles v the crown – by Jack Charles
- Blood Links – by William Yang
- Endings – by Tamara Saulwick
- Meeting – choreographed by Antony Hamilton
- The Return – by Circa
- Hamlet – by William Shakespeare
- All's Well That Ends Well – by William Shakespeare

== 2017–2018 ==
- Life After – by Britta Johnson
- Backbone – choreographed by Jera Wolfe and conceived by Sandra Laronde
- Triptyque – by The 7 Fingers (7 doigts de la main)
- Heisenberg – by Simon Stephens
- Declarations – by Jordan Tannahill
- The Humans – by Stephen Karam
- he who falls (celui qui tombe) – conceived by Yoann Bourgeois
- Musica Nuda – featuring Petra Magoni & Ferruccio Spinetti
- In This Body – conceived by Fides Krucker
- Tanya Tagaq + Laakkuluk Williamson Bathory – by Tanya Tagaq + Laakkuluk Williamson Bathory
- Betroffenheit – by Crystal Pite and Jonathon Young
- The Overcoat: A Musical Tailoring – music by James Rolfe and libretto by Morris Panych
- Love and Information – by Caryl Churchill
- picnic in the cemetery – by Njo Kong Kie
- King Lear – by William Shakespeare
- Twelfth Night – by William Shakespeare

== 2018–2019 ==
- The Children – by Lucy Kirkwood
- Xenos – choreographed by Akram Khan, written by Jordan Tannahill
- Trace – conceived by Sandra Laronde
- Grand Finale – choreographed by Hofesh Shechter
- Every Brilliant Thing – by Duncan MacMillan
- Tartuffe – by Moliere
- Prince Hamlet – by William Shakespeare, adapted by Ravi Jain
- who we are in the dark – choreographed by Peggy Baker, featuring Jeremy Gara and Sarah Neufeld of Arcade Fire
- Revisor – by Crystal Pite and Jonathon Young
- Unsafe – by Sook-Yin Lee and Zack Russell
- Bigre – by Pierre Guillois, Agathe L'Huillier, and Olivier Martin Salvan
- 887 – by Robert Lepage
- I Swallowed a Moon Made of Iron – by Njo Kong Kie
- By Heart – by Tiago Rodrigues
- The Full Light of Day – by Daniel Brooks and Kim Collier
- Romeo and Juliet – by William Shakespeare
- A Midsummer Night's Dream – by William Shakespeare

== 2019–2020 ==
The 2019–2020 season was the first presented by artistic director Brendan Healy and executive director Monica Esteves. It featured productions from artists in Canada and from around the world. Some of the productions were cancelled because of the COVID-19 pandemic, with many being presented in a subsequent season.

- Much Ado About Nothing – by William Shakespeare
- Measure for Measure – by William Shakespeare
- The Book of Life – by Odile Gakire Katese
- Un Poyo Rojo – directed by Hermes Gaido
- Minorities – choreographed by Yang Zhen
- Let's Run Away – by Daniel MacIvor
- Spirit – created by Bangarra Dance Theatre
- Sweat – by Lynn Nottage
- Radical Vitality – choreographed by Marie Chouinard
- How to Fail As a Pop Star – by Vivek Shraya
- AF – by Sandra Laronde and Neil Coppen
- Always Still the Dawn – by Susanna Fournier
- Crypto – by Royce Varek
- Kelly v. Kelly – by Britta Johnson and Sara Farb

== 2020–2021 ==
- Cloudless – by José Teodoro (digital event)

== 2021–2022 ==
- Ladies and Gentlemen, Boys and Girls (High Park Amphitheatre)
- Blackout – book by Steven Gallagher, music & lyrics by Anton Lipovetsky (High Park Amphitheatre)
- Is My Microphone On? – by Jordan Tannahill (High Park Amphitheatre)
- In My Body – by Bboyizm/Crazy Smooth
- Other People – written and performed by Daniel Brooks

== 2022-2023 ==
- Public Enemy - by Olivier Choinière translated and adapted by Bobby Theodore
- Choir Boy - by Tarell Alvin McCraney
- Little Dickens - by Ronnie Burkett
- Fall On Your Knees - co-created and written by Hannah Moscovitch, co-created and directed by Alisa Palmer, production dramaturgy by Mel Hague, based on the novel by Anne-Marie MacDonald
- Miigis: Underwater Panther by Sandra Laronde in collaboration with performers
- Are we not drawn onward to new erA Ontroerend Goed
- Fairview by Jackie Sibblies Drury
- Maanomaa, My Brother created by Tawiah M'Carthy and Brad Cook, with Anne-Marie Donovan

== 2023–2024 ==
- A Midsummer Night’s Dream – by William Shakespeare
- Topdog/Underdog – by Suzan-Lori Parks
- Jungle Book Reimagined – by Tariq Jordan, based on the book by Rudyard Kipling
- Red Sky at Night – by Sandra Laronde
- The Lehman Trilogy – by Stefano Massini, adapted by Ben Power
- Kidd Pivot: A New Creation – by Crystal Pite and Jonathon Young
- The Shadow Whose Prey the Hunter Becomes – by Mark Deans, Michael Chan, Bruce Gladwin, Simon Laherty, Sarah Mainwaring, Scott Price, and Sonia Teuben
- Universal Child Care – by Norah Sadava and Amy Nostbakken
- The Inheritance – by Matthew López

== 2024–2025 ==
- Hamlet – by William Shakespeare
- 1939 – by Jani Lauzon and Kaitlyn Riordan
- My Name Is Lucy Barton – by Elizabeth Strout, adapted by Rona Munro
- Playing Shylock – by Mark Leiren-Young
- Winter Solstice – by Roland Schimmelpfennig, translated by David Tushingham
- Who's Afraid of Virginia Woolf? – by Edward Albee
- Fat Ham – by James Ijames
- Mahabharata: Karma (Part One) – The Life We Inherit – by Ravi Jain and Miriam Fernandes
- Mahabharata: Dharma (Part Two) – The Life We Choose – by Ravi Jain and Miriam Fernandes
- The Festival of New Theatre
- The Sound of Our Nation: A Canadian Songbook

== 2025–2026 ==
- Romeo and Juliet – by William Shakespeare
- Slave Play – by Jeremy O. Harris
- The Far Side of the Moon – by Robert Lepage
- Moonlight Schooner – by Kanika Ambrose
- A Doll's House – by Henrik Ibsen, adapted by Amy Herzog
- You, Always – by Erin Shields
- Little Willy – by Ronnie Burkett
- Clyde's – by Lynn Nottage

== Pantomimes ==
Starting in 2024, Canadian Stage took over Ross Petty's annual Christmas pantomime series at the Winter Garden Theatre in Toronto, with Petty serving as executive producer emeritus.

Year	Show title	Cast	Ref.
2024	The Wizard of Oz — by Matt Murray	Julia Pulo, Vanessa Sears, Dan Chameroy, Eddie Glen, Jonathan Cullen, Saphire Demitro	
2025	Robin Hood: A Very Merry Family Musical — by Matt Murray	Julia Pulo, Daniel Williston, Damien Atkins, Praneet Akilla, Eddie Glen, Julius Sermonia, Malinda Carroll, Jean-Paul Parker, Kyle Brown, Cara Hunter, Joedan Bell, Sierra Holder	
2026	Cinderella — by Matt Murray	Stephanie Sy, Jordan Bell, Andrew Broderick, James Daly, Izad Etemadi, Sierra Holder, Hailey Lewis, Andrew McAllister, Kristen Peace, Kirstyn Russelle, Mitch Wood, Shawn Wright	

== See also ==
- Soulpepper Theatre Company production history (1998), Toronto
- Theatre Passe Muraille production history (1969), Toronto
