= Soulpepper Theatre Company production history =

Soulpepper is a Toronto, Ontario-based theatre company founded to present classic plays. The following is a chronological list of the productions that it has staged since its inception.

== 1998 ==
- The Misanthrope by Molière
- Don Carlos by Friedrich Schiller

== 1999 ==
- Our Town by Thornton Wilder
- The Play's the Thing by Ferenc Molnár
- A Streetcar Named Desire by Tennessee Williams
- Endgame by Samuel Beckett
- Platonov by Anton Chekhov

== 2000 ==
- The Mill on the Floss by George Eliot
- Platonov by Anton Chekhov
- Twelfth Night by William Shakespeare
- Krapp's Last Tape by Samuel Beckett
- The School for Wives by Molière
- Betrayal by Harold Pinter

== 2001 ==
- A Flea in Her Ear by Georges Feydeau
- Present Laughter by Noël Coward
- La Ronde by Arthur Schnitzler
- Uncle Vanya by Anton Chekhov
- The Bald Soprano by Eugène Ionesco
- The Lesson by Eugène Ionesco
- MacHomer Rick Miller

== 2002 ==
- The Winter's Tale by William Shakespeare
- A Chorus of Disapproval by Alan Ayckbourn
- Miss Julie by August Strindberg
- The Maids by Jean Genet
- Absolutely Chekhov by Anton Chekhov
- Uncle Vanya by Anton Chekhov
- The Beggar's Opera by John Gay

== 2003 ==
- No Man's Land by Harold Pinter
- Happy Days by Samuel Beckett
- Phèdre by Jean Racine
- She Stoops to Conquer by Oliver Goldsmith
- The Play's the Thing by Ferenc Molnár

== 2004 ==
- Waiting for Godot by Samuel Beckett
- Nathan the Wise by Gotthold Ephraim Lessing
- The Dumb Waiter by Harold Pinter
- The Zoo Story by Edward Albee
- Translations by Brian Friel
- Mirandolina by Carlo Goldoni
- Hamlet by William Shakespeare

== 2005 ==
- Hamlet by William Shakespeare
- Olympia by Ferenc Molnár
- The Wild Duck by Henrik Ibsen
- Fool for Love by Sam Shepard
- The Long Valley by John Steinbeck

== 2006 ==
- The Chairs by Eugène Ionesco
- The Importance of Being Earnest by Oscar Wilde
- American Buffalo by David Mamet
- King Lear by William Shakespeare
- Our Town by Thornton Wilder
- The Caretaker by Harold Pinter
- A Christmas Carol by Charles Dickens

== 2007 ==
- The Threepenny Opera by Bertolt Brecht and Kurt Weill
- John Gabriel Borkman by Henrik Ibsen
- Leaving Home by David French
- Top Girls by Caryl Churchill
- The Time of Your Life by William Saroyan
- Three Sisters by Anton Chekhov
- Mary Stuart by Friedrich Schiller
- Blithe Spirit by Noël Coward
- Our Town by Thornton Wilder

== 2008 ==
- Salt-Water Moon by David French
- The Odd Couple by Neil Simon
- As You Like It by William Shakespeare
- 'night Mother by Marsha Norman
- Under Milk Wood by Dylan Thomas
- Uncle Vanya by Anton Chekhov
- The Way of the World by William Congreve
- Black Comedy by Peter Shaffer
- The Real Inspector Hound by Tom Stoppard
- Ring Round the Moon by Jean Anouilh
- A Raisin in the Sun by Lorraine Hansberry
- Top Girls by Caryl Churchill
- A Christmas Carol by Charles Dickens

== 2009 ==
- Travesties by Tom Stoppard
- Glengarry Glen Ross by David Mamet
- Loot by Joe Orton
- Awake and Sing! by Clifford Odets
- Of the Fields, Lately by David French
- Billy Bishop Goes to War by John Gray and Eric Peterson
- Who's Afraid of Virginia Woolf? by Edward Albee
- The Guardsman by Ferenc Molnár
- Antigone by Sophocles (new adaptation by Evan Webber and Chris Abraham)
- Parfumerie by Miklós László
- Civil Elegies by Dennis Lee

== 2010 ==
- Billy Bishop Goes to War by John Gray and Eric Peterson
- Oh, What a Lovely War! by Joan Littlewood and Theatre Workshop
- The Aleph by Jorge Luis Borges (new adaptation by Daniel Brooks and Diego Matamoros)
- Glengarry Glen Ross by David Mamet
- Faith Healer by Brian Friel
- Waiting for the Parade by John Murrell
- Jitters by David French
- The Cherry Orchard by Anton Chekhov (new adaptation by Daniel Brooks and members of the Soulpepper Academy)
- A Month in the Country by Ivan Turgenev
- What the Butler Saw by Joe Orton
- Doc by Sharon Pollock
- A Raisin in the Sun by Lorraine Hansberry
- Death of a Salesman by Arthur Miller
- A Christmas Carol by Charles Dickens

== 2011 ==
- Oleanna by David Mamet
- A Midsummer Night's Dream by William Shakespeare
- The Fantasticks by Harvey Schmidt and Tom Jones
- The Time of Your Life by William Saroyan
- Our Town by Thornton Wilder
- Billy Bishop Goes to War by John Gray and Eric Peterson
- Fronteras Americanas by Guillermo Verdecchia
- The Aleph by Jorge Luis Borges (new adaptation by Daniel Brooks and Diego Matamoros)
- The Glass Menagerie by Tennessee Williams
- The Kreutzer Sonata by Leo Tolstoy (adaptation by Ted Dykstra, in association with Art of Time Ensemble)
- Exit the King by Eugène Ionesco
- White Biting Dog by Judith Thompson
- The Price by Arthur Miller
- The Odd Couple by Neil Simon
- Ghosts by Henrik Ibsen
- Parfumerie by Miklós László

== 2012 ==
- Long Day's Journey into Night by Eugene O'Neill
- High Life by Lee Macdougall
- Home by David Storey
- You Can't Take It with You by Moss Hart and George S. Kaufman
- Kim's Convenience by Ins Choi
- Speed-the-Plow by David Mamet
- The Sunshine Boys by Neil Simon
- The Royal Comedians by Mikhail Bulgakov
- The Crucible by Arthur Miller
- Death of a Salesman by Arthur Miller
- Endgame by Samuel Beckett
- A Christmas Carol by Charles Dickens

== 2013 ==
- Rosencrantz and Guildenstern Are Dead - by Tom Stoppard
- True West - by Sam Shepard
- La Ronde - by Arthur Schnitzler, adapted by Jason Sherman
- The Barber of Seville - by Pierre Beaumarchais and Gioachino Rossini, adapted by Michael O'Brien and John Millard
- Kim's Convenience - by Ins Choi
- Entertaining Mr Sloane – by Joe Orton
- Great Expectations - by Charles Dickens, adapted by Michael Shamata
- Angels in America: A Gay Fantasia on National Themes (Part One) - by Tony Kushner
- The Norman Conquests - by Alan Ayckbourn
- Farther West - by John Murrell
- Alligator Pie - Created by Ins Choi, Raquel Duffy, Ken MacKenzie, Gregory Prest, Mike Ross; Based on the Poems by Dennis Lee
- Parfumerie - by Miklós László

== 2014 ==
- Idiot's Delight - by Robert E. Sherwood
- The Gigli Concert - by Tom Murphy
- The Road to Mecca - by Athol Fugard
- Of Human Bondage, a stage adaptation - by Vern Thiessen of W. Somerset Maugham's novel
- Twelve Angry Men - by Reginald Rose
- Tartuffe - by Molière
- A Tender Thing - by Ben Power
- Glenn - by David Young
- The Norman Conquests trilogy - by Alan Ayckbourn
- The Crucible - by Arthur Miller
- Angels in America, Parts I and II - by Tony Kushner
- A Brimful of Asha with Why Not Theatre
- Trudeau and the FLQ with VideoCabaret
- Borne, a new work from Judith Thompson and RARE Theatre Company

== 2022 ==
- Alice In Wonderland 2022 - Adapted by Fiona Sauder
- 'Da Kink in My Hair - by Trey Anthony
- Peggy Pickit Sees the Face of God - by Roland Schimmelpfennig
- The Golden Record - by Mike Ross
- The Ex-Boyfriend Yard Sale - Haley McGee
- Awakenings
- Bad Parent - By Ins Choi
- Queen Goneril - by Erin Shields
- King Lear - by William Shakespeare
- Kamloopa - by Kim Senklip Harvey
- Where the Blood Mixes - by Kevin Loring
- Pipeline - by Dominique Morisseau

== See also ==
- Canadian Stage production history (1987), Toronto
- Theatre Passe Muraille production history (1969), Toronto
