= Theatre Passe Muraille production history =

Canadian theater company

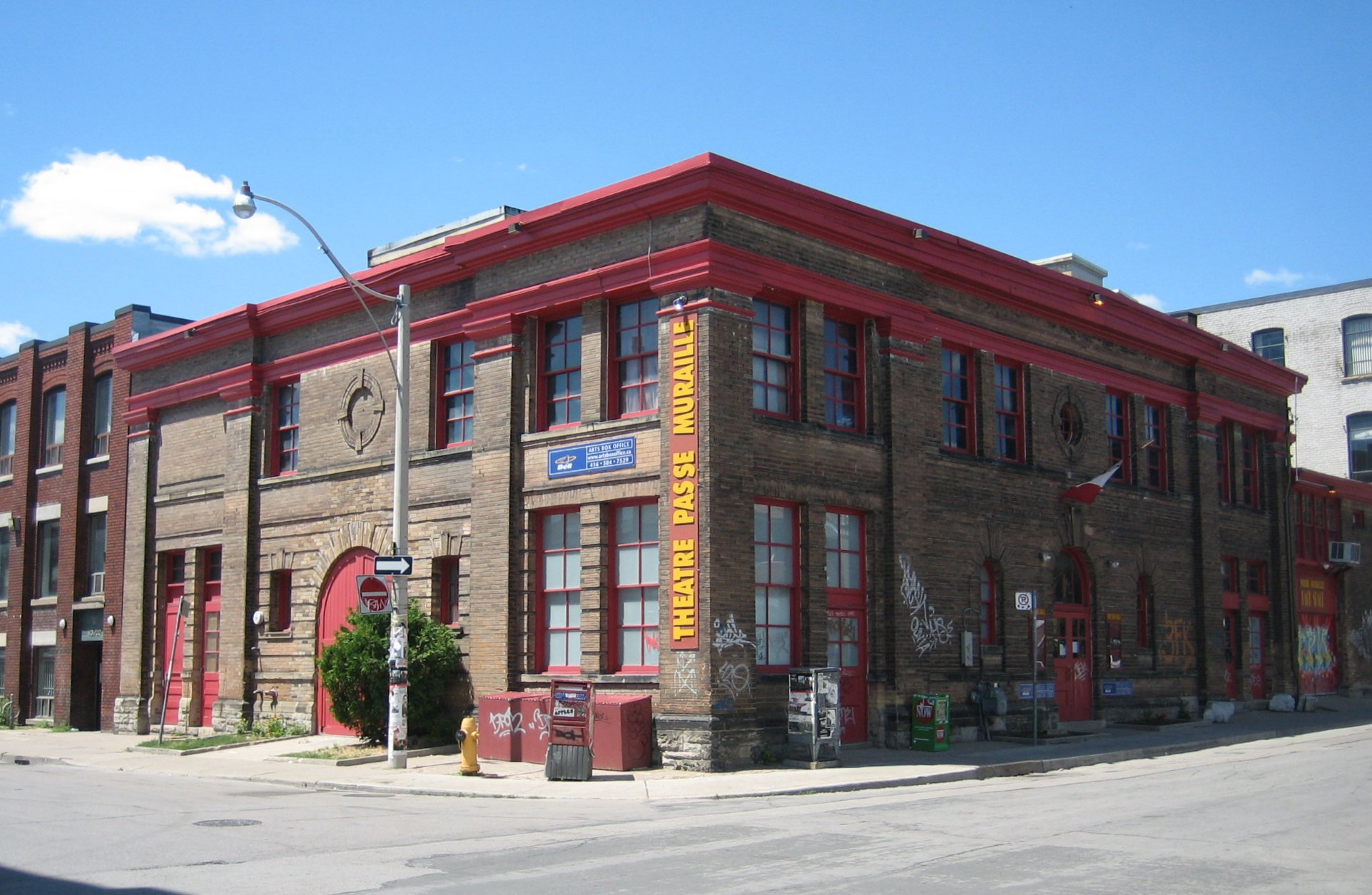
The home of the theatre on Ryerson Street

Theatre Passe Muraille is a theatre company in Toronto, Ontario, Canada. The following is a chronological list of the productions that have been staged since its inception.

== 1969 ==
- Futz by Rochelle Owens

== 1970-1972[?] ==
- Bethune! by Peter Boretski with collective
- The Black Queen Is Going to Eat You All Up by Jim Gerrard with collective
- Buffalo Jump by Carol Bolt
- Canadian Heroes Series #1 by John Boyle with collective

== 1971 ==
- Doukhobors by Paul Thompson

== 1972 ==
- The Farm Show by Paul Thompson

== 1973 ==
- 1837: The Farmer's Revolt by Paul Thompson and Rick Salutin

== 1975 ==
- I Love You, Baby Blue by Paul Thompson

== 1976 ==
- The Blues by Hrant Alianak

== 1977 ==
- 18 Wheels by John MacLachlan Gray
- I Love You, Baby Blue 2 directed by Hrant Alianak co-writer collective

== 1979 ==
- Maggie and Pierre by Linda Griffiths

== 1980 ==
- The Crackwalker by Judith Thompson

== 1983 ==
- O.D. on Paradise by Linda Griffiths

== 1986 ==
- Jessica by Linda Griffiths

== 1989 ==
- Fire by Paul Ledoux and David Young

== 1990 ==
- Rigoletto by Michael Hollingsworth, Don Horsburg and Deanne Taylor

== 1991 ==
- Lilies by Michel Marc Bouchard
- The Stone Angel by Margaret Laurence, adapted by James W. Nichol

== 1994 ==
- The Last Supper

== 1996 ==
- Still the Night by Theresa Tova

== 1997 ==
- Possible Worlds by John Mighton

== 1998 ==
- The Drawer Boy by Michael Healey
- Aurash by Soheil Parsa and Brian Quirt

== 2008 ==
- Hardsell
- Smokescreen & Born Ready
- Last Days of Graceland

== 2021-2022 ==
- Toka by Indrit Kasapi, Directed by Cole Alvis — A Theatre Passe Muraille & lemonTree creations Digital Co-Production
- Iphigenia and the Furies (On Taurian Land) by Ho Ka Kei (Jeff Ho) — A Saga Collectif, Architect Theatre & Theatre Passe Muraille Digital Co-Production

== 2022-2023 ==
- Trace by Tristan R. Whiston and Moynan King
- Never the Last by Molly McKinnon and Christine Quintana
- Rubble by Suvendrini Lenay
- Okay, you can stop now by Shakeil Rollock
- our place by Kanika Ambrose
- Miriam’s World by Naomi Jaye
- RUTAS Festival by Aluna Theatre

== 2023-2024 ==
- No One’s Special at the Hot Dog Cart by Charlie Petch
- Woking Phoenix by Silk Bath Collective
- PXR Conference 2023
- VUKA facilitated by Tsholo Khalema
- As I Must Live It by Luke Reece

== See also ==
- Canadian Stage production history (1987), Toronto
- Soulpepper Theatre Company production history (1998), Toronto
- Growing Pains: Toronto Theatre in the 1970s (1980), Toronto
