= Chouinard =

Chouinard may refer to:

== Surname ==
- Bobby Chouinard (born 1972), Filipino-American baseball player
- Eric Chouinard (born 1980), American-Canadian ice hockey player
- Guy Chouinard (1956–2025), Canadian ice hockey player
- Josée Chouinard (born 1969), Canadian figure skater
- Julien Chouinard (1929–1987), Puisne Justice of the Canadian Supreme Court
- Marc Chouinard (born 1977), Canadian ice hockey player
- Marie Chouinard (born 1955), Canadian dancer and choreographer
- Mathieu Chouinard (born 1980), Canadian ice hockey player
- Yvon Chouinard (born 1938), American climber and businessman

== Other ==
- former name of Patagonia, Inc.
- former name of Black Diamond Equipment
- Chouinard Art Institute
