= 6th ACTRA Awards =

Canadian television awards ceremony

- Date: April 14, 1977
- Hosted by: Pierre Berton

Highlights
- Best TV Program: Beaverbrook: Life and Times of Max Aitken
- Best Radio Program: The Assassination of Christopher Marlowe

Television/radio coverage
- Network: CBC Television

The 6th ACTRA Awards were presented on April 14, 1977.

== Winners ==
Best Television Program	Best Radio Program
Beaverbrook: Life and Times of Max Aitken; Of the Fields, Lately; Sarah	The Assassination of Christopher Marlowe; Eye Witness to the Gold Rush; A Touch of the Poet
Best Television Actor	Best Radio Actor
Sean Sullivan, Of the Fields, Lately; John Colicos, Beaverbrook: Life and Times of Max Aitken; Jane Mallett, The Larsens; Gerard Parkes, As Loved Our Fathers	Maureen Fitzgerald, A Touch of the Poet; Chris Wiggins, A Touch of the Poet; Jack Scott, Crabdance
Best Continuing TV Performance	Best Public Affairs Broadcaster
Robert Clothier, The Beachcombers; Bruno Gerussi, The Beachcombers; Fiona Reid, King of Kensington	Patrick Watson, The Last Nazi; Roy Bonisteel, Man Alive; Adrienne Clarkson, The Fifth Estate
Best Television Variety Performance	Best Radio Variety Performance
Diane Stapley, The Diane Stapley Show; Julie Amato, The Julie Show; The Irish Rovers	Roger Abbott, Dave Broadfoot, Don Ferguson, Luba Goy and John Morgan, Royal Canadian Air Farce; Bill Buck, Donna Christie, Norm Grohman and Bill Reiter, Dr. Bundolo's Pandemonium Medicine Show; Mary Nelson, Jazz Radio Canada
Best News Broadcaster	Best Sports Broadcaster
Peter Desbarats; Peter Kent; Terri Stacey	Ernie Afaganis; Ted Reynolds; Don Wittman
Best Writing, Television or Film Drama	Best Writing, Radio Drama
Peter Pearson and Norman Hartley, The Insurance Man from Ingersoll; David French, Of the Fields, Lately; Gordon Pinsent, A Gift to Last	Michael Mercer, Freydis of Greenland; Len Peterson, Étienne Brûlé; Marian Waldman, Palindrome
Best Writing, Television Documentary	Best Writing, Radio Documentary
Adrienne Clarkson and Brian McKenna, The Fifth Estate: "The Olympic Connection"; Donald Brittain, Volcano: An Inquiry into the Life and Death of Malcolm Lowry; Steve Hyde, Rodeo	Brenda Rabkin, Adolescent Suicide; Malka Himel, The Holocaust; George R. Robertson, The Lost Patrol
Gordon Sinclair Award	John Drainie Award
Judy LaMarsh, The Government We Deserve; Adrienne Clarkson and David Gerrard, The Fifth Estate: "Dioxin"; Adrienne Clarkson, Michael Smedley and Gerard McAuliffe, The Fifth Estate: "Citizen McCain"	John Reeves
