= Florence Paterson =

Canadian actress (1927–1995)

- Born: November 3, 1927; St. John's, Newfoundland and Labrador, Canada
- Died: July 23, 1995 (aged 67); Vancouver, British Columbia, Canada
- Occupation: Actress
- Years active: 1954–1995

Florence Paterson (November 3, 1927 – July 23, 1995) was a Canadian actress.

== Early life ==
The daughter of machinist and politician George Nightingale and Violet Noseworthy, she was born in St. John's, Newfoundland and was educated there.

== Career ==
Paterson taught school for a time and then trained in nursing. She married John Paterson. She joined the St. John's Players in 1954, won awards at several drama festivals in the province and performed on CBC radio. She moved to Halifax, Nova Scotia in 1972, where she performed with the Neptune Theatre Company.

She played the role of Mary Mercer in David French's theatrical play Of the Fields, Lately in 1973, and later reprised the role in Mike Newell's 1976 television adaptation.

In 1989, she moved to Vancouver, British Columbia. She appeared in the 1990 movie Bird on a Wire, the 1990 television adaptation of Stephen King's "It" as Ms. Kersh, and the 1994 movie Little Women as Hannah. She also appeared in the CBC television series Backstretch.

== Personal life ==
Paterson died in Vancouver at the age of 67.

== Filmography ==
=== Film ===
Year	Title	Role	Notes
1985	Def-Con 4	Mrs. Boyd	
1990	Bird on a Wire	Molly Baird	
1994	Little Women	Hannah	

=== Television ===
Year	Title	Role	Notes
1977, 1982	For the Record	Betty	2 episodes
1983	The Undaunted	Elizabeth I	Episode: "Sir Humphrey Gilbert"
1987	Seeing Things	Gwen	Episode: "Another Point of View"
1989	Unsub	Mrs. Karchocov	Episode: "Silent Stalker"
1989	Lantern Hill	Justina Titus	Television film
1989	The Lady Forgets	Rebecca's Mom	Television film
1990	Wiseguy	Adele Tilshaw	Episode: "Meet Mike McPike"
1990	Getting Married in Buffalo Jump	Irene McCallum	Television film
1990	It	Mrs. Kersh	Episode: "Part 2"
1991	Captive	Hilda Bruger	Television film
1992	To Grandmother's House We Go	Great Grandma Mimi	Television film
1992	The Man Upstairs	Mrs. Porter	Television film
1994	Seasons of the Heart	Sarah, housekeeper	Television film
