= Possible Worlds (film) =

- Directed by: Robert Lepage
- Screenplay by: Robert Lepage
- Based on: Possible Worlds by John Mighton
- Produced by: Sandra Cunningham; Ted East
- Starring: Tilda Swinton; Tom McCamus; Sean McCann; Gabriel Gascon
- Cinematography: Jonathan Freeman
- Edited by: Susan Shipton
- Release date: 4 September 2000 (Venice Film Festival)
- Running time: 93 minutes
- Country: Canada
- Language: English

Possible Worlds is a 2000 Canadian film adaptation of the 1990 play of the same name by John Mighton. The film is directed by Robert Lepage, and stars Tom McCamus and Tilda Swinton. The film's musical score is by George Koller.

Mighton approached Lepage to direct an adaption of his play. Lepage, who had seen a tape of Daniel Brook's minimalistic 1998 production, agreed to the request. He liked Mighton's combining of art and science and the theme of diverse, multilayered identity.

The Australian film festival Possible Worlds, running since 2006, was named after the film.

== Plot synopsis ==
The film follows the script of the play. George Barber (Tom McCamus) is a mathematician having strange dreams. He continuously meets a woman, Joyce (Tilda Swinton), at a bar. Sometimes, she is a scientist, sometimes she is a stockbroker, and she doesn't seem to remember him from a moment to another. He has also a dream about strange men who move stones here and there on a rocky waterfront. There is a man in this dream, the Guide (Gabriel Gascon), who is also a neuroscientist in real life.

The neuroscientist is interviewed by two detectives (Sean McCann and Rick Miller) about a serial killer stealing the brains of its victims. After agreeing to follow him on a beach, Joyce with George, sees a distant red light flickering on the ocean horizon. In the neuroscientist's lab, many brains are connected to red lights, indicating brain activity. The neuroscientist lies near a machine containing a brain and tries to influence the brain by thoughts.

George goes to see a doctor, who is the neuroscientist, about his strange dreams. The detectives arrest the neuroscientist, now understanding he is the one stealing brains for his experiments on consciousness. George's corpse was found without his brain, which is now kept artificially alive in the machine.

Joyce Barber is told her husband's brain is still alive but experiencing life in a discontinuous dream state. In the final scene, George and Joyce are again reunited on the beach, but this time the red light on the horizon goes out for good. It is suggested the real-life Joyce agreed to end George's consciousness out of compassion.

== Awards ==
=== Won ===
- Best Achievement in Art Direction/Production Design - Genie Awards
- Best Achievement in Editing - Genie Awards
- Special Jutra - Jutra Awards

=== Nominated ===
- Achievement in Direction - Genie Awards
- Best Achievement in Cinematography- Genie Awards
- Best Motion Picture - Genie Awards
- Best Performance by an Actress in a Leading Role - Genie Awards
- Best Art Direction - Jutra Awards
- Best Cinematography - Jutra Awards

== Reception ==
On Rotten Tomatoes, the film has an aggregate score of 60% based on 3 positive and 2 negative critic reviews.
