= Ann Diamond =

Canadian poet and novelist (born 1951)

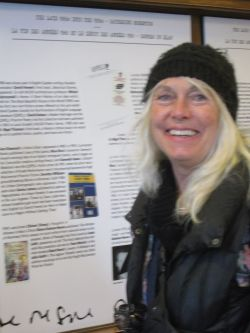
- Born: 11 April 1951 (age 75); Montreal, Quebec, Canada
- Education: Concordia University; Goddard College
- Occupations: Writer, poet, novelist
- Writing career
- Genres: Poetry, Fiction
- Notable awards: Hugh MacLennan Prize for Fiction (1994)
- Website: anndiamond.ca

Ann Diamond (born 11 April 1951) is a Canadian poet, short story writer, and novelist. She was the winner of the 1994 Hugh MacLennan Prize for Fiction from the Quebec Writers' Federation.

== Early life ==
Diamond was born 11 April 1951 in Montreal. She received a Bachelor of Arts from Concordia University before studying creative writing at Goddard College.

== Work ==
Diamond's first book, Lil, was published in 1977. Her second book, A Nun's Diary, was adapted for theatre by Robert Lepage (retitled Echo) and presented in Montreal and Toronto at Theatre Passe Muraille. Her third book of poetry, Terrorist Letters, was published in 1992.

Diamond released her first novel, Mona's Dance, in 1989, followed by short story collections Snakebite in 1989 and Evil Eye in 1991. Her narrative style has been called "distinctive" as it "blur[s] ... realism and surrealism"; and her fiction also tends to "feature female characters burdened by painful relationships." Evil Eye won the 1994 Hugh MacLennan Prize for Fiction. In 2000, Diamond released Dead White Males, followed by Static Control in 2006.

In 2006, Diamond published a memoir, My Cold War, where she claims to be a victim of secret mind-control experiments, allegedly sponsored by the American CIA. The book was republished under the title A Certain Girl in 2011.

In 2014, Diamond self-published The Man Next Door about her friend and neighbour Leonard Cohen.

== Publications ==
=== Poetry ===
- Lil (1977)
- A Nun's Diary. Montreal: Signal Editions. 1989. ISBN 978-0-919890-97-8.
- Terrorist Letters. Montreal: Signal Editions. 1992. ISBN 978-1-55065-035-8.

=== Short story collections ===
- Snakebite: Short Stories. Dunvegan, Ontario: Cormorant Books. 1989. ISBN 0920953131.
- Evil Eye. Montréal: Véhicule Press. 1994. ISBN 978-1-55065-043-3. Winner of the 1994 Hugh MacLennan Prize for Fiction.

=== Novels ===
- Mona's Dance. New Canadian novelists series. Kingston (Canada): Quarry Press. 1988. ISBN 978-0-919627-98-7.
- Dead White Males. Montréal: DC Books. 2000. ISBN 978-0-919688-72-8.
- Static Control. Montreal: Livres Diamondback Books. 2005. ISBN 978-1-4116-4494-6.

=== Memoirs ===
- My Cold War. Montréal: Livres Diamondback Books. 2005. ISBN 978-0973900439. Republished as A Certain Girl in 2011.
- The Man Next Door. Lulu.com. 2014. ISBN 978-1312147126. Self-published.
