= Peter Chu =

American dancer (born 1978)

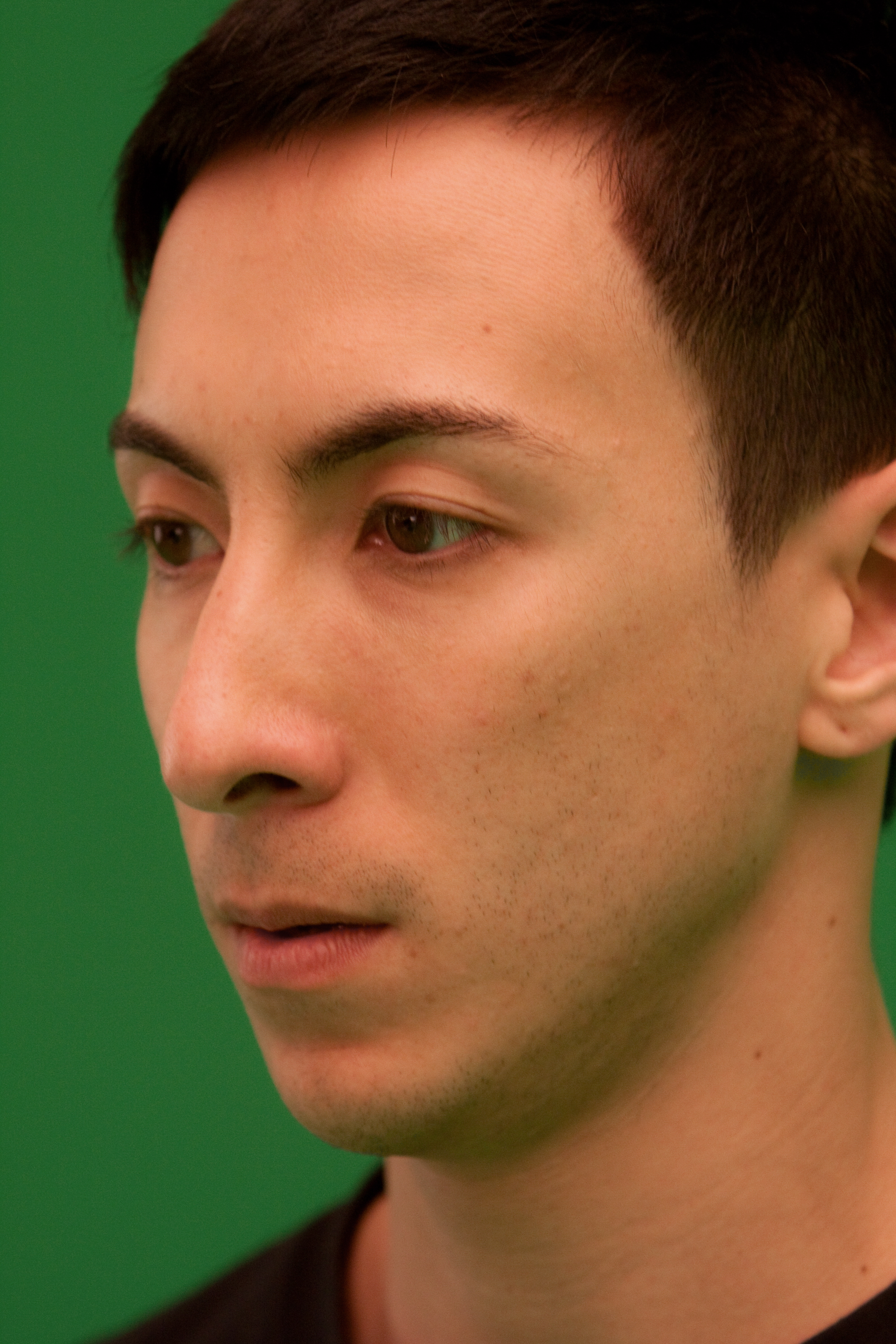
- Chu in 2010
- Born: May 2, 1978 (age 48); The Bronx, New York, U.S.
- Occupations: Dancer, choreographer, educator, director
- Style: Contemporary / modern dance
- Website: http://www.chuthis.net

Peter Chu is an American choreographer, dancer, educator, and director. Born in The Bronx and raised in Cocoa Beach, Florida, Chu is best known for his creative process combining Traditional Chinese Medicine practices like Qigong and Taiji with modern dance. Chu has choreographed and danced extensively both the concert dance and commercial dance industries during his decades-long career and has been described as a "sought-after artist" with "international acclaim.”

== Early life and education ==
Chu first trained as a gymnast and cheerleader before beginning studies at Dussich Dance Studio, and advancing his studies at Dance by Holly Rock. He later graduated from The Juilliard School with a B.F.A. in Dance under the direction of Benjamin Harkarvy.

== Accolades ==
In 2018, Chu received the Harvard Blogett Award for distinguished artist, for his creative process and work at the Theater, Dance, and Media Department at Harvard University. He was the winner of the 2010 Capezio A.C.E. Award for choreographing the work, This Thought. Chu was the featured choreographer during the 2008 Perry-Mansfield New Works Festival. Upon graduation from The Juilliard School, he was awarded the Hector Zaraspe Prize for Choreography.

== As a performer ==
As a concert dancer, Chu has performed with dance companies Frankfurt RM, BJM Danse (Les Ballets Jazz de Montréal), EZdanza, Azure Barton and Artists, and spent seven years as a company member of Crystal Pite's Kidd Pivot. Commercially, he was principal dancer in the music video for Christina Perri's "Jar of Hearts" and was a performer in Celine Dion's A New Day.

== As a choreographer and director ==
He has choreographed for Cirque du Soleil (Vitori & MUV), Ballet Augsburg, Backhaus Dance, Charlotte Ballet, Cincinnati Ballet, DART Dance Company, Gibney Dance Company, Giordano Dance Chicago, Hubbard Street Dance Chicago, Kansas City Ballet, Nederlands Dans Theater (NDT) Summer Intensive, Orlando Ballet Theatre, Paul Taylor Dance Company, and Jacob's Pillow.

In the commercial dance industry, Chu was a guest choreographer in seasons 9 and 10 of So You Think You Can Dance.

== As an educator ==
Chu has been an artist in residence at the USC Kaufman School of Dance, and served as a guest faculty member at Harvard University for 3 years. He choreographs with universities, including at Princeton, FSU college of Fine Arts, and Western Michigan University. He has been faculty at Adrenaline Dance and Broadway Dance Center, and has been a guest teacher at studios such as Steps on Broadway and The Dance Studio of Fresno, among others.

== chuthis. Dance Company ==
In 2008, Chu formed a project-based dance company, called chuthis. In 2010, the company premiered Chu's work, Nothing Sticks, in New York City and Vancouver, British Columbia. Since then, the company has gone on to do performances, workshops, choreography and re-staging, and rehearsal directing. In 2024, chuthis. held a residency at Orsolina 28, where they concluded their intensive with a mini tour to Germany and the Netherlands featuring a duet evening called SHIFT. In 2025, the company consisted of seven dancers.

== Videos ==
A library of concert works trailers is available here: https://vimeo.com/peterchuthis

A youtube playlist of works, interviews, and class excerpts is available here: https://youtube.com/playlist?list=PLCj5kCEwfgRFUabx12beqMxK6LjM142g0&feature=shared

"Moving Constructs” by Peter Chu - Focus On Creation '24 - Orsolina28 Art Foundation

Peter Chu | Contemporary | Steps on Broadway

Giving Tuesday: Interview w/ Peter Chu | Paul Taylor Dance
