= Electric Company Theatre =

Electric Company Theatre is a professional theatre company based in Vancouver, British Columbia, Canada.

== History ==
The Electric Company Theatre was originally formed as a collective in 1996 by Kim Collier, David Hudgins, Kevin Kerr and current Artistic Director Jonathon Young, who met while training at Vancouver's Studio 58. The team has created nearly 20 original works of theatre and performed 13 tours in Canada, USA, and the United Kingdom. The company has won the first Alcan Award for Theatre in 2001 in addition to numerous industry awards around Canada.

The Electric Company Theatre group has written and directed a feature film for the CBC called The Score in 2005.

Electric Company has performed in industrial warehouses, a science centre, the Pacific Ocean, and two swimming pools. Electric Company is a resident company at Progress Lab 1422, a 6,000+ sq ft theatre creation space in the Commercial Drive neighbourhood co-founded with Rumble Theatre, Neworld Theatre, and Boca del Lupo.

== Productions ==
- Betroffenheit - produced in association with Kidd Pivot (2015)
- FLEE - (2015)
- OBSTRUCTIONS: There is No Way To Fix What Is Going Wrong (2014)
- You Are Very Star (2011, 2013)
- Initiation Trilogy (2012)
- All The Way Home (2012)
- Tear The Curtain!, produced in association with the Arts Club Theatre Company (2010, 2012)
- Everyone, produced in association with Caravan Farm Theatre, November Theatre, Pound of Flesh, Neworld Theatre, Theatre Melee, and Theatre Replacement (2010)
- The Flannigan Affair (2008)
- No Exit, produced in association with Virtual Stage (2006, 2009, 2010, 2011)
- Studies In Motion: The Hauntings Of Eadweard Muybridge (2006, 2009, 2010)
- At Home With Dick And Jane (2006, 2010)
- Palace Grand (2004, 2008)
- The Fall (2003)
- The One That Got Away (2002, 2007)
- Flop (2002)
- Dona Flor And Her Two Husbands (2001)
- The Score (2000)
- The Wake (1999)
- Brilliant! The Blinding Enlightenment Of Nikola Tesla (1996, 1998, 1999, 2003, 2005, 2006, 2008)

== Awards ==
Kim Collier was awarded the 2010 Elinore and Lou Siminovitch Prize in Theatre, a $100,000 prize which stipulates that the winner must give $25,000 of the award to a protege, which went to director Anita Rochon.

Kevin Kerr was awarded the 2002 Governor General's Award for Drama.

Electric Company Theatre was awarded the 2001 Rio Tinto Alcan Performing Arts Award.
