= Odd Jobs (play) =

Canadian play by Frank Moher

- Original language: English
- Written by: Frank Moher
- Genre: Drama

Premiere
- Date: 10 October 1985
- Place: Theatre Network, Edmonton, Alberta

Odd Jobs is a Canadian play by Frank Moher. It premiered on 10 October 1985 at Theatre Network in Edmonton, Alberta. Odd Jobs is regarded as Moher's most popular work, and was performed internationally. The play was a finalist for the Governor General's Award and the Chalmers Award, and won the Los Angeles Drama-Logue Award in 1993.

== Plot ==
Odd Jobs is a two-act drama following the developing relationship between Tim Arends, a laid-off factory worker trying to make a living by picking up yard work, and Mrs. Leonora Phipps, an aging and increasingly disoriented widow.

In Edmonton, Tim arrives at Mrs. Phipps' house offering yard work and household help. She's initially reticent but eventually hires him, paying generously and allowing him to set his own schedule. As autumn progresses, Tim becomes a regular presence, raking leaves and picking raspberries which he uses to learn to make jam. Mrs. Phipps, once a university mathematics professor, lives alone beside a highway, her mind slipping between present reality and vivid memories of her late husband Wendell and their mountain-climbing past.

Tim, meanwhile, struggles with his own displacement: laid off after years on the factory floor, he resists retraining while he tries to build up his odd jobs business, without success. His wife, Ginette, is pragmatic and ambitious, working at Sears as a salesperson while taking a computer training course at night school. Their marriage shows strain: she wants progress and financial security; he wants autonomy and dignity in his work.

As Tim's visits to Mrs. Phipps increase, an unusual companionship develops. She hires him full-time after experiencing nighttime wandering episodes that exhibit her growing vulnerability. He takes on more responsibility for her house and garden, and she, in turn, begins tutoring him in math, bridging their generational and class divide through shared learning.

Meanwhile, Ginette's world shifts. She lands a well-paying data-input job, but in Regina, hundreds of miles away. The prospect of relocating creates a conflict: Ginette expects Tim will move with her, but he's increasingly attached to his new role and bond with Mrs. Phipps.

Mrs. Phipps' decline continues: she wanders the highway at night, her grasp on time and place slipping. Ginette, aware of Tim's hesitation, even offers to have Mrs. Phipps live with them in Regina. She refuses; fiercely independent, unwilling to become a burden on them. Instead, she contrives an excuse to fire Tim, so he'll go with his wife.

Aware of her escalating vulnerability, however, she arranges to move into a retirement home. Tim is appalled by her description of it, and wavers in his commitment to accompany Ginette. But when Mrs. Phipps is nearly killed on the highway, saved only by Tim and Ginette, she lets go of her stubbornness and reluctantly takes them up on their offer to move with them. In the final scene, in Regina, Ginette happily heads off to work, while Mrs. Phipps continues to tutor Tim in math. Tim has begun taking night classes to complete his high school diploma, while Mrs. Phipps looks for her own place to live.

== Cast and characters ==
Cast and characters of Odd Jobs
Character	Description	Original cast	U.S. premiere cast
Tim Arends	Unemployed factory worker, 29 years old	Eric Kramer	Marty Lodge
Ginette Arends	Tim's French-Canadian wife, 30 years old	Christine MacInnis	Jane Beard
Mrs. Phipps	Elderly former mathematician	Mary Monks	Vivienne Shub

== Production history ==
=== Canada ===
Frank Moher began writing Odd Jobs in 1982. Commissioned by Catalyst Theatre, the play premiered on 10 October 1985 at Theatre Network in Edmonton, Alberta. Its first performance was directed by Jan Selman and designed by Morris Ertman, with a cast including Mary Monks, Eric Kramer, and Christine MacInnis. The play received positive reviews in local and national publications, and was named best Edmonton production of 1985 by the Canadian Broadcasting Corporation. In 1986, the play was performed at City Stage in Vancouver, British Columbia and the Gryphon Theatre in Barrie, Ontario, starring the actress Charmion King. It was performed at the McPherson Playhouse in Victoria as part of the British Columbia Drama Festival on 28 May 1987, and given a stage reading at the University of Regina Arena Theatre as part of their Spring Festival of New Plays the same year. In 1995, Odd Jobs was performed at the Centrepointe Theatre in Nepean, Ontario by the Nepean Little Theatre.

Odd Jobs was performed in Toronto for the first time on 28 September 1988, opening at the Free Theatre Downstairs on Berkeley Street. It was the first production of the Canadian Stage Company, which had recently been established. In 1989, Odd Jobs was performed at the Gladstone Theatre in Ottawa by the Great Canadian Theatre Company, directed by Steven Bush. This was soon followed by a production by the Prairie Theatre Exchange in Winnipeg, Manitoba in 1990.

Odd Jobs was translated into French by Laurier Gareau and Simone Verville in 1991. The translation, L'homme a tout faire, was performed by Troupe du Jour in Saskatoon, Saskatchewan the same year. It was produced by the Alberta Theatre Projects as part of their 1994–95 season, followed by a production at Theatre Erebus in Hamilton, Ontario in 1995. In 2000, the play was performed at the Centre Stage Theatre in Kentville, Nova Scotia; they performed it again in 2016. Odd Jobs returned to British Columbia in 2018 with a performance at the Shuswap Theatre in Salmon Arm, directed by Danielle Dunn-Morris.

=== United States ===
Odd Jobs had its American premiere in February 1991 at the Round House Theatre in Bethesda, Maryland, directed by Jeff Davis. In April 1992, the play was produced at the Asolo Repertory Theatre in Sarasota, Florida, directed by Margaret Booker. In November and December 1992, Odd Jobs was performed at the South Coast Repertory in Costa Mesa, California, directed by David Emmes.

In January 1994, Odd Jobs was performed at the Indiana Repertory Theatre in Indianapolis, with the actress Deirdre Lovejoy cast as the French-Canadian character Ginette. The play was performed again in June 1998 by the Detroit Repertory Theatre in Detroit, Michigan, directed by Harry Wetzel. Odd Jobs came to South Carolina in January 2007 with a production by the South Carolina Repertory Company.

=== International ===
Beyond North America, Odd Jobs has been performed internationally, in countries such as Ireland, New Zealand, and Japan. In 1993, it was performed at the Gyre and Gimble Theatre in Dublin, Ireland, starring Agnes Bernelle. The play was translated into Japanese by Toyoshi Yoshihara, and had its Japanese premiere at the Mingei Theatre in 2003. Odd Jobs was performed again the following year at the Maple Leaf Theatre in Tokyo to positive reception. Later in 2004, the play was performed at the Hyogo Butai Theatre. It returned to Japan in 2009 at the Bunkaza Theatre, followed by a performance at Sai Studio in 2010. Odd Jobs was given two stage readings at the New National Theatre in Tokyo in 2017.

== Reception ==
As Moher's most popular play, Odd Jobs is described as being reminiscent of the works of Anton Chekhov, or Marcel Dubé's Le temps des lilas. The play received generally positive reviews in Canada and internationally. Following its premiere in 1985, Liz Nicholls of the Edmonton Journal described Odd Jobs as "a little gem of a play", writing that it "manages, in the counterpoint of its three characters, to generate real anger, real warmth, real passion – not some half-baked polemical substitute." It was similarly praised by Sylvie Drake of The Los Angeles Times, who described the play as a "small, tightly woven work, whose title doesn't begin to suggest the mathematical equation that connects the three characters, like the points of a triangle."

The play was well-received in Japan, with the Japanese play director Takehisa Kaiyama stating that Moher's plays were "easier for Japanese people to understand", in contrast to American plays which he said are "twisted around". Kaiyama noted that Japanese people more easily relate to Moher's depiction of "ordinary people in ordinary situations".

Moher was surprised by the popularity and longevity of Odd Jobs, saying in 1994 that it was "the last play [he] would have expected to have the kind of extended and widespread life it's had". Moher noted that the play was "pretty relevant at the time in Alberta" due to an ongoing recession and employment scarcity.

== Awards and nominations ==
Odd Jobs was a finalist for the Governor General's Award in 1987. It was a finalist for the Chalmers Award in 1989, and won the Los Angeles Drama-Logue Award in 1993.

== See also ==
- List of Canadian plays
- Theatre of Canada
