= Jonathon Young =

Canadian actor

- Born: May 8, 1973 (age 53); Richmond Hill, Ontario, Canada
- Education: Studio 58
- Occupation: Actor
- Years active: 1996–present
- Partner: Amy Rutherford
- Children: Azra Young (Died 2009)

Jonathon Young (born May 8, 1973) is a Canadian actor known for his role of Nikola Tesla on the SyFy show Sanctuary. Appearances include The Fog, Eureka and Stargate Atlantis. Young is a well-respected stage actor. He is the co-founder of Electric Company Theatre in Vancouver, British Columbia, Canada.

== Early life ==
Born on May 8, 1973, in Richmond Hill, Ontario, he was raised in Vernon, British Columbia, along with his brother and sister. Their father was a school teacher who started a community theatre in Armstrong, British Columbia. At a "Q&A" after the play No Exit, Young told the audience that his father often brought him and his sister to watch him act and that this is where his love for theatre began. Becoming an actor was never a choice, but rather just something he knew he was going to do.

== Career ==
Young is a graduate of the Studio 58 theatre school at Langara College, Vancouver, British Columbia. In 1996 he co-founded Electric Company Theatre along with fellow Studio 58 alumni Kim Collier, David Hudgins, and Kevin Kerr. He is a multiple Jessie Richardson Theatre Award winner. His play Palace Grand was commissioned for production by Vancouver's PuSh International Performing Arts Festival in 2008.

Young has collaborated with the contemporary dance theatre company Kidd Pivot, first in the award-winning "Betroffenheit" (premiered 2015, co-created by Young and choreographer and dancer Crystal Pite), and again in "Revisor" (2019), an adaptation of Nikolai Gogol's 1836 play The Government Inspector (again with Pite).

== Filmography ==
=== Film ===
Year	Title	Role	Notes
1998	Firestorm	Sherman	
2000	Trixie	Gas attendant	
2000	Chain of Fools	Poetry reader	
2000	Blacktop	Young gas attendant	
2001	Antitrust	Stinky	
2001	Head Over Heels	Agent Guy	
2001	Suddenly Naked	Waiter	
2003	A Guy Thing	Bachelor Party Guy	
2005	The Sisterhood of the Traveling Pants	Duncan	
2005	The Score	Benny	
2005	The Fog	Dan the weatherman	
2007	The Road to Loudenvielle	Narrator	
2007	Nightwatching	Visscher	
2008	Control Alt Delete	Sanderson	
2009	Alien Trespass	Lloyd	
2015	Eadweard	Eakins	
2021	Hollywood.Con	Wedding Guard/El Jade's Zombie Wedding Attendee	

=== Television ===
Year	Title	Role	Notes
1996	The Angel of Pennsylvania Avenue	Eddie	Television film
1997	The Outer Limits	Billy	Television series, 2 episodes
1998	Principal Takes a Holiday	Librarian	Television film
1999	You Know My Name	Hugh	Television film
2000	Hollywood Off-ramp		Television series, 1 episode
2000	Rocky Times		Television film
2001	Da Vinci's Inquest	Lucas Ross	Television series, 1 episode
2002	Mysterious Ways	Leonard	Television series, 1 episode
2002	Jeremiah	Edgar Weston	Television series, 1 episode
2002	Breaking News	Artie Walsh	Television series, 1 episode
2002	Taken	Slide	Television mini-series, 1 episode
2004	Life As We Know It	Jerry	Television series, 1 episode
2004	A Bear Named Winnie	Macray	Television film
2005	Terminal City	Jimmy Crib	Television series, 4 episodes
2008	The Englishman's Boy	John Dawe	Television mini-series
2008	Eureka	Dr. Ethan Edison	Television series, 1 episode: "Bad to The Drone"
2008	Stargate: Atlantis	Dr. Parrish	Television series, 2 episodes: "Remnants" and "Runner"
2008	Sanctuary	Nikola Tesla	Television series, 17 episodes
2012, 2022	Murdoch Mysteries	Ernest Harding	Television series, 2 episodes: "Invention Convention", "Pendrick's Planetary Parlour"
2014	Intruders	Larry Owens	Television series, 1 episode: "The Shepherds and the Fox"
2014	Icetastrophe	Neil	Television film
2015	Impastor	Det. Hyde	Television series, 2 episodes: "Genesis", "On The Third Day..."
2017	Betroffenheit	User/Host/Responder	Television film
2021	The Flash	Dr. Olsen	Television Series, 1 episode: "Rayo de Luz"

== Dance / Theatre ==
Year	Title	Role	Notes
2015	Betroffenheit	Actor and Writer	
2019	Revisor	Writer	
2023	An Undeveloped Sound	Writer and Director	
2023	Assembly Hall	Writer and Director	
