= Kidd Pivot =

Dance theatre company

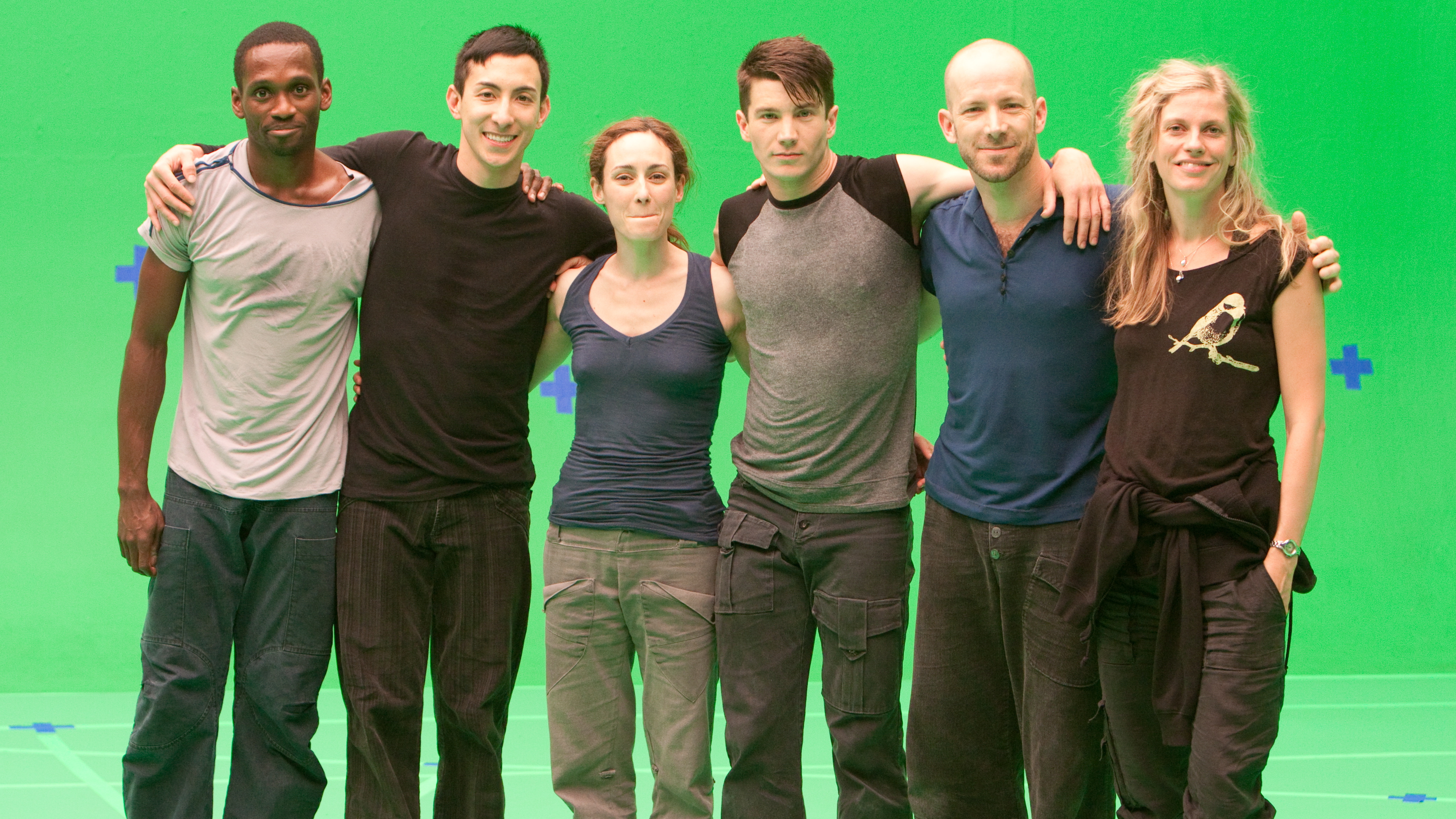
- Kidd Pivot dancers Jermaine Spivey, Peter Chu, Anne Plamondon, Yannick Matthon, and choreographer Crystal Pite filming Lost Action: Trace in 2010

General information
- Name: Kidd Pivot
- Previous names: Kidd Pivot Frankfurt RM
- Year founded: 2002
- Location: Vancouver, BC

Senior staff
- Director: Crystal Pite
- Assistant director: Eric Beauchesne

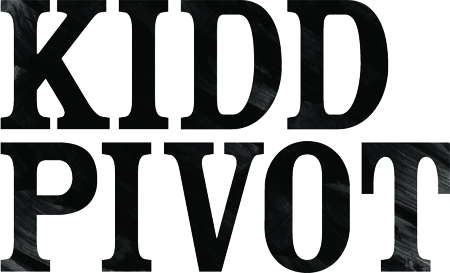
Kidd Pivot Logo

Kidd Pivot (known from 2010 to 2012 as Kidd Pivot Frankfurt RM), is a contemporary dance theatre company based in Vancouver, Canada. The company, currently comprising eight full-time dancers and several guest artists, is led by its founder and artistic director, Crystal Pite. Since its formation in 2002 Kidd Pivot has toured extensively around the world, presenting several works, many of which have received awards and accolades from the international dance community.

== Early years ==
Kidd Pivot was founded in 2002 by Canadian dancer and choreographer, Crystal Pite. The company's first full-length piece, Uncollected Work (2003), features Pite and fellow Canadian dancer Cori Caulfield in two sections: Farther Out and Field: Fiction. Farther Out explored "philosophical poetics and high camp of science fiction: the danger and thrill of limitless possibility, the beckoning of uncharted territory". The second half of the work examined a different element of writing, the destruction of one's own work in the editing process. Inspired by Annie Dillard's The Writing Life, Pite delves into the artist's creative process in this work.

The company's subsequent piece, Double Story (2004), co-created with Richard Siegal, "integrate[s] text, puppets, and goofy masks," foreshadowing the puppetry that features in Pite's later work. The piece explored the different perspectives of two people in a romantic relationship. The Bouncy Woman Piece was a duet choreographed by Siegal in 2002 that served as the first section of Double Story. Pite then choreographed Man Asunder as a response to Siegal's original work. Two large mirrors set on stage aid the narrative of reflection and perspective by literally flipping as Siegal's choreography ends and Pite's begins. Elements of deconstruction and breaking down the fourth wall are also used as the two performers would drink water, speak to each other casually, and physically move set pieces intermittently.

== Lost Action ==
In 2006, Kidd Pivot received the Rio Tinto Alcan Performing Arts Award, a $60,000 award that resulted in the creation of Lost Action. Seven dancers, including Pite herself, performed on the themes of war, love, and loss. Kaija Pepper of The Dance Current said the following about the piece: "Lost Action, however it is understood or experienced by the crowds that filled the theatre (the last four performances were sold out), is a major work of art."

Kidd Pivot performed Lost Action at Sadler's Wells in London as part of the theatre's Debut series. Judith Mackrell of The Guardian commented that "Pite has a rare gift for orchestrating bodies, part of the tension in Lost Action comes from wondering how she can top each new invention. But she has an even rarer gift for conveying emotion". Luke Jennings of The Observer listed Lost Action first in his Top 10 list of dance works performed in London during 2009: "this profound and compassionate work was absolutely the revelation of the year."

In 2011, the National Film Board of Canada released a short film, Trace, based on Lost Action.

== Dark Matters ==
Dark Matters premiered in 2009 in Ottawa at The National Arts Centre. It was later co-presented by DanceHouse and the Vancouver 2010 Cultural Olympiad at The Playhouse Theatre in 2010 in association with The Vancouver 2010 Olympics. Dark Matters was called: "sinister magic with towering shadows, menacing puppets, and hooded figures." Pite was inspired by the mysterious forces of dark matter and its impact on the universe, interpreted through the body and mind. In The Guardian, Pite said the piece was about; "loneliness, obsession, and the danger of creation".

Dancer Peter Chu plays the puppet maker. He carefully constructs a marionette that begins to move on its own, operated by other dancers that are only seen as hooded figures and represent puppeteers. The marionette figure eventually destroys the puppet maker. This action can be seen as a commentary on the life of an artist and how, "what you create can destroy you." Towards the middle of the piece the hooded figures rip apart the set and make room for the second half to begin. In signature Crystal Pite style, the first section sets up a strong narrative while the second allows for a more movement-based abstraction of the story. Crystal Pite herself is revealed at the end as the puppet master. The piece asks the audience to question the notion of free will and the power of individual agency. The text that is used during the first section of the piece is from Voltaire's Poem on the Lisbon Disaster.

Jacob's Pillow Dance Festival presented Dark Matters in 2011 and 2012.

== Künstlerhaus Mousonturm ==
Beginning in January 2010, Kidd Pivot formed a residency partnership with Frankfurt-based Künstlerhaus Mousonturm theatre and Kulturfonds Frankfurt Rhine-Main, changing its public name to Kidd Pivot Frankfurt RM in recognition of the support received. As part of the arrangement, the company worked in Frankfurt for several extended periods. While resident at Künstlerhaus Mousonturm, the company created and presented The You Show (2010) and The Tempest Replica (2011). The company originally signed on for a two-year deal that was later extended to three years, ending in 2013.

The You Show explored different kinds of conflicts that can exist in a relationship between two people. The piece was split into four duet sections; A Picture of You Falling, The Other You, Das Glashaus, and A Picture of You Flying. The first, A Picture of You Falling, is the only section that existed before the company's residency in Frankfurt and was performed by Peter Chu and Anne Plamondon. Voice over cues described a previous conflict, the setting of a simple room, and physical cues like, "this is you reaching back" that were executed by the dancers. The Other You is a duet with Eric Beauchesne and Jiri Pokorny. The two men appeared eerily similar, dressed in identical suits and of the same size and build who moved directly and dynamically. Das Glashaus, performed by Cindy Salgado and Yannick Matthon, was accompanied by a symphony of broken glass, put together by longtime composer and collaborator Owen Belton. The final section, A Picture of You Flying, was a humorous segment that complemented the more serious nature of the earlier three parts. Jermaine Spivey and Sandra Marin Garcia performed as caped superheroes struggling with ordinary relationship problems, involving double identities and comic elements. The You Show originally premiered in Frankfurt and later toured internationally.

At the beginning of her research for The Tempest Replica, Pite intended to use film noir as her inspiration but found they lacked "enough humanity and spirituality". The Tempest Replica was then based on William Shakespeare's play The Tempest. Using Shakespeare's characters and setting, Pite re-created the shipwreck at the beginning of the play using dance as a new platform to interpret the original story. In the beginning of the piece, Prospero appears in regular clothing while the other dancers are dressed in grey and wearing large masks. The masked dancers move robotically and are manipulated by Prospero, played by Eric Beauchesne. Prospero later performs several duets and trios with the other dancers during the second half. Throughout the piece scene numbers and lines from the original script were projected to create a play-within-a-play. Pite openly talked about her struggles during the creation of this piece, "I was scrambling, panicked, just barely keeping my head above water". After the original Frankfurt premiere she stated that, "it wasn't done. It wasn't awful, but it wasn't what it was going to be. I knew that I would need more time and money to fix it." When Pite became an artistic associate with Sadler's Wells in 2013, the theatre afforded her the opportunity to re-stage The Tempest Replica where the revised version premiered in 2014. The newer version won an Olivier Award in 2015 for Outstanding Achievement in Dance.

== Collaborations with Jonathan Young ==
At the 2015 Pan American Games Kidd Pivot premiered Betroffenheit, the company's first collaboration with Canadian actor Jonathon Young. Young is the co-artistic director of Electric Company Theatre, a Vancouver-based theatre group. The story of Betroffenheit is based on the real-life event Young experienced when he lost his daughter, niece and nephew in an accidental fire in 2009. Though the word Betroffenheit has no exact equivalent in English, it can be interpreted as "Shocked, wordless, traumatized. Stuck in a looping, never-ending hell." as Laura Bleiberg describes in her piece for The Los Angeles Times. Split into two acts, the first places Young in a trapped in an industrial-style room representing his own mind where the text he wrote and recorded himself loops several short phrases like, "What happened" and "What do we say" over a PA type system. These phrases can represent both internal and external dialogue appropriate in the wake of a disaster. The dancers each represent both kinds of distractions and internal demons, portraying showgirls, tap-dancing clowns, and other characters performing a Vegas-style floor show just for Young. The set is then ripped apart, making way for the powerful and expansive moment performed in the second half. This multi-disciplinary piece explores themes of loss, addiction, and grief. The piece ends with hope for recovery and remembrance of those lost. Betroffenheit received several awards; Laurence Olivier Award for Best New Dance Production in 2017, The Georgia Straight's Critic's Choice Innovation Award presented at The Jessie Richardson Theatre Awards in 2016, Dora Mavor Moore Award for Outstanding Production in 2016, and The Critic's Circle National Dance Award for Outstanding Performance in Modern Dance to Jonathon Young for his performance in Betroffenheit in 2016.

Kidd Pivot premiered its newest piece and second collaboration with Jonathon Young, Revisor, in 2019. Revisor premiered in 2019 at The Vancouver Playhouse in Vancouver, British Columbia. Revisor is a piece for eight dancers and uses recorded dialogue from several Canadian actors to aid in portraying the narrative. Revisor is inspired by and loosely based on Nikolai Gogol's 1836 play, The Government Inspector.

== 1Day for the Climate Initiative ==
1Day for the Climate is a company-employee initiative that Kidd Pivot began in 2015. Members of Kidd Pivot wanted to acknowledge the carbon footprint of their annual international touring schedule and decided to donate the salary of one days work annually towards carbon offsetting. The individual member salaries of all Kidd Pivot employees and collaborators are then matched by the company and the total is donated to various carbon offset projects. Kidd Pivot is the only dance company in the world to tour carbon neutrally and has collectively offset over 400 tonnes of CO2e since 2015. 1Day for the Climate supports projects that help in mitigating the social and environmental impacts of climate change. Using the money raised from 1Day for the Climate, Kidd Pivot has specifically supported 350.org, The Sierra Club BC, and the David Suzuki Foundation among others.

== Kidd Pivot Works ==
- Revisor (2019)
- Betroffenheit (2015)
- The Tempest Replica (2011)
- The You Show (2010)
- Dark Matters (2009)
- Lost Action (2006)
- Double Story (2004)
- Uncollected Works (2003)

== Awards ==
- 2004 : Paul D. Fleck Fellowship from The Banff Centre – Crystal Pite for choreographic development with Kidd Pivot
- 2004 : Bonnie Bird North American New Choreography Award – Crystal Pite
- 2005 : Isadora Award for Choreography – Crystal Pite for Kidd Pivot
- 2006 : Rio Tinto Alcan Performing Arts Award administered by the Vancouver East Cultural Centre
- 2006 : Jessie Richardson Theatre Award for outstanding choreography
- 2008 : Governor General of Canada's Performing Arts Award, Mentorship Program – Crystal Pite
- 2011 : Jacob's Pillow Dance Award – Crystal Pite for Kidd Pivot
- 2012 : Lola Award – Crystal Pite
- 2012 : Canada Council for the Arts' Jacqueline Lemieux Prize – Crystal Pite
- 2012 : Dora Mavor Moore Award for Outstanding Production (Dark Matters)
- 2015 : Olivier Award for Outstanding Achievement in Dance (The Associates – A Picture of You Falling, The Tempest Replica and Polaris at Sadler's Wells)
- 2016 : Georgia Straight Critic's Choice Innovation Award at The Jessie Richardson Theatre Awards (Betroffenheit)
- 2016 : Dora Mavor Moore Award for Outstanding Production (Betroffenheit)
- 2017 : Olivier Award for Best New Dance Production (Betroffenheit, Sadler's Wells)
- 2018 : Dance Magazine Award Honouree – Crystal Pite
- 2018 : Grand Prix de la Danse de Montreal Laureate 2018 (Betroffenheit, Festival TransAmériques)
- 2019 : Chrystal Dance Prize (Revisor, Dance Victoria)
