= Leaving Home (play) =

Leaving Home is a drama in two acts by Canadian playwright David French.

The work is the first presented of what has come to be known as the Mercer Plays, followed by Of the Fields, Lately, Salt-Water Moon, 1949 and Soldier's Heart. It has been credited with introducing a unique Canadian voice to the world, and with proving that "Canadian playwrights could write plays on Canadian subjects and people would flock to see them."

== History ==
The play premiered at the Tarragon Theatre on May 16, 1972, directed by Bill Glassco. Credits included set by Dan Yarhi and Stephen Katz, and costumes by Vicky Manthorpe. The play featured actors Maureen Fitzgerald, Frank Moore, Mel Tuck, Sean Sullivan, Lynne Griffin, Liza Creighton and Les Carlson.

First written as a television play, French offered the work to Glassco after seeing his production of David Freeman's Creeps. French describes the experience: "I asked him to read my play. He did. He called me and he sat there with the script in his lap. 'I like your script,' he grinned, 'but I don't think you've realized its full potential.'" French then grabbed his script and tore out on the street, calling Glassco every profanity imaginable. "Imagine my nerve. Thankfully, he chased me down the road and made me come back."

Leaving Home was a success in 1972, with its theme of fighting for identity in a troubled home resonating with audiences. "It's very autobiographical," French confesses. "I mean, I'm Ben in the play and yes it was cathartic writing my own story. But not everything in that play is true, of course."

French concedes he wrote the play because he loved his dad and that love needed some form of public expression. "I'm really all the characters in my plays, male and female but with my dad it was something serious. As an adolescent, we had a troubled relationship and that was my fault as much as his."

French felt that in some ways, writing Leaving Home did his dad an injustice. "Well, it was just one picture of him. That's all. You have to put all the pictures together."

== Main characters ==
- Jacob Mercer, the Newfoundlander who finally brought his family to settle in Ontario. Portrayed as a flawed but loving father, he is a compendium of patriarchal values and is the only character in all of the Mercer family cycle. (Neither Mary nor Ben are in French's Soldier's Heart, which, while being most recently written, is ironically the oldest in the family's chronology.) Jacob is in his fifties but looks older. A man who is used to leading his family in a patriarchal fashion is devastated by the new way of life and the decisions of his sons to leave home. Secretly he longs for old friends and times when he was needed.
- Mary Mercer, at fifty, is a devoted mother and wife who has her hands full with her three men. She is the mediator of the family and the confidante of the boys.
- Bill Mercer, seventeen. He would rather stay home than marry his girlfriend, Kathy, but he must because she is pregnant. He is a little more worldly than his brother Ben.
- Ben Mercer, eighteen, the oldest son. He took the responsibility of looking after his family when his father had an accident. He is closest to Mary, but he is not a "mama's boy". His relationship with his father has always been strained.

== Synopsis ==
The play focuses on the Mercer family, and is part of French's series of plays that revolve around them, including Salt Water Moon, 1949, Of the Fields, Lately, and Soldier's Heart. In Leaving Home, the Mercers are in the throes of preparations for their youngest son's (Bill) wedding to a young lady (Kathy) he has gotten pregnant. As they sit down for dinner the night of the wedding rehearsal, things erupt when Ben, the elder son, reveals he is moving out as well. Minnie, Kathy's mother, arrives and throws a wrench into the proceedings, bringing up the relationship she once shared with Jacob. When it's revealed that Kathy has had a miscarriage, the teens are left to choose whether or not they will continue with their wedding plans.

== Interpretations and observations ==
The piece is set in the 1950s and, as critic Herbert Whittaker of the Globe and Mail said at the play's premiere, "smacks of autobiography." The play introduces two families, one Catholic and one Protestant, before a wedding rehearsal. The troubles between the two clans serve as a catalyst for exposing the troubles within the Mercer family itself: between the mother and father and particularly between one son and his father. All hell breaks loose with the family finally falling to pieces as the father refuses to attend the wedding rehearsal and a son announces he is leaving.

In an article on the creation of the work, French wrote, "Each time a problem was solved, the solution in turn would create a host of other problems that had to be solved. It is a slow and stumbling way to work, but it does offer at least one consolation and a rather important one: each character in the play will be there for a definite dramatic purpose...It was the most cathartic experience of my life. The more I began to understand the relationships in the family the more moved I became. There were times I couldn't see the typewriter for tears, and times I would almost topple my chair howling with laughter at the funny things the people said and did."
