= Salt-Water Moon =

Salt-Water Moon is a Canadian theatrical play by David French, first staged by Tarragon Theatre in 1984. It is the third in his Mercer Plays series, following Leaving Home (1972) and Of the Fields, Lately (1973), and preceding 1949 (1988) and Soldier’s Heart (2001).

Unlike the earlier plays, which centred on Jacob and Mary Mercer's relationships with their adult children in the 1960s, Salt-Water Moon depicts the beginning of their relationship in 1926. Jacob previously dated Mary until breaking up when he moved to Toronto a year earlier, but upon returning to Coley's Point he discovers that she is now engaged to another man and sets out to win her back.

== Production history ==
The original Tarragon production starred Richard Clarkin as Jacob and Denise Naples as Mary. A 1986 production in Ottawa for the Great Canadian Theatre Company starred Marshall Button and Rona Waddington. A production for the Blyth Festival in 2004 starred Darren Keay and Charlotte Gowdy; Keay had also played Jacob in the premiere of the sequel Soldier's Heart in 2001.

A 2008 revival for Soulpepper Theatre starred Jeff Lillico and Krystin Pellerin.

== Awards ==
The play won both the Floyd S. Chalmers Canadian Play Award and the Dora Mavor Moore Award for Outstanding New Play in 1985, and was a Governor General's Literary Award nominee for English-language drama at the 1985 Governor General's Awards. Bill Glassco was also a Dora nominee for Best Director, and Sue LePage was nominated for Best Set Design.

At the 15th ACTRA Awards in 1986, Lenore Zann won the award for best actress in a radio drama for a CBC Radio production of the play. Urjo Kareda was also nominated, but did not win, best radio writing for the adaptation.
