= Frank Moher =

Canadian playwright (born 1955)

- Born: 1955 (age 70–71); Edmonton, Alberta, Canada
- Occupations: Playwright; theatre director; journalist
- Notable work: Odd Jobs (1985)
- Website: frankmoher.com

Frank Moher (born 1955) is a Canadian playwright, theatre director, and journalist based in Gabriola Island, British Columbia. His most popular play, Odd Jobs (1985), was a finalist for the Governor General's Award and won the Los Angeles Drama-Logue Award in 1993. Moher has had a prolific career in theatre, founding the Western Edge Theatre in Nanaimo, British Columbia in 2003 and later serving as its Executive Director until 2022.

Born in Edmonton, he began writing plays in his youth, producing his first while still in high school. He was educated at the University of Alberta, where he later taught. He has written a wide variety of plays and musicals, and has written articles for The Globe and Mail, Saturday Night, and the Alberta Report, among others. Moher is a producer and journalist for Life on Gabriola TV, and was previously the publisher and editor of the online magazine backofthebook.

== Early life and career ==
Frank Moher was born in 1955 in Edmonton, Alberta. His father was a sportswriter and journalist. At the age of 12, Moher performed in the musical Jackpot at Walterdale, later attributing his interest in stage performance to the "electrifying experience" of the musical. He spent part of his youth in New York and Connecticut before returning to Alberta. Moher produced his first play, Damn You, Shakespeare, at the age of 15 while attending Bishop Grandin High School in Calgary. It won second place in the Alberta Playwriting Competition. Moher's first published play, Pause, premiered at the 49th Street Theatre in Calgary in 1974, and won the Alberta Adult Playwriting Contest the same year.

After graduating from high school, Moher attended the University of Alberta in Edmonton. During his second year there, he was given a copy of Henry Kreisel's The Broken Globe, which he subsequently adapted into a play. Moher's The Broken Globe was first performed at a university workshop production, and premiered at Theatre 3 in Edmonton in February 1976. The Broken Globe was subsequently adapted for local television, airing on CBXT in March 1976.

During the production of The Broken Globe at Theatre 3, Moher was commissioned to create a children's play for the theatre's Christmas show. In collaboration with the composer Lawrence Reese, Moher produced the musical The Grimm Brothers' Road Show. Moher expressed dissatisfaction with the musical, referring to the Brothers Grimm fairy tales as "too moralistic and often quite frightening." Moher and Reese collaborated again on Doctor Dolittle at the Northern Light Theatre, where the production had a long run and was quite well-received. Moher later settled on Gabriola Island in British Columbia in the late 1980s.

== Playwrighting ==
Moher's most celebrated work, Odd Jobs (1985), was a finalist for the Governor General's Award and won the Los Angeles Drama-Logue Award in 1993. In 1989, Moher won the Sterling Award for his play Prairie Report (1988). Among his other plays are The Third Ascent (1988), which toured Canada and won the Edmonton Sterling Award for Outstanding New Play; Supreme Dream (with Rhonda Trodd, 1995), which also toured Canada; and Big Baby (2004), which was performed across Europe. Moher has also written musicals, including McLuhan: The Musical, which premiered at the Great Canadian Theatre Company in 1994. He created E-script, an online playwrighting workshop, and ProPlay, an online play publisher. Moher has taught and lectured at the University of Alberta, the University of British Columbia, and Malaspina College (Vancouver Island University).

Moher founded the Western Edge Theatre in Nanaimo, British Columbia in 2003, where he was the artistic producer from 2003 to 2012. He retired as Executive Director of the theatre in 2022.

== Television, film, and radio ==
Moher has written for television, film, and radio. In 1978, his radio play Down for the Weekend aired on CBC Radio's Radio Drama Series. Moher subsequently adapted the play for stage, which premiered at the Northern Light Theatre in 1980. His other radio plays include Orchids and Cacti (1980), for which he was nominated for an ACTRA Award for Best Writer in 1981; Life Line (1982), and Janus (1984).

He portrayed the mob boss Lucien in the 2016 film The Ol' Amity Blues, directed by Jeff James Monson.

== Journalism ==
As a journalist, Moher has written for The Globe and Mail, Saturday Night, the Alberta Report, the National Post, the Vancouver Sun, and The Georgia Straight. Moher is a producer and journalist for the local media organization Life on Gabriola TV, and was the publisher and editor of the online magazine backofthebook.

== Works ==
=== Plays ===
- Pause (1974), 49th Street Theatre, Calgary.
- The Broken Globe (1976), Theatre 3.
- Stage Falls (1978), Persephone.
- Down For The Weekend (1980), Northern Light Theatre.
- Odd Jobs (1985), Theatre Network.
- Sliding for Home (1987) with Gerald Reid and William Shookhoff, Workshop West Theatre.
- The Third Ascent (1988), Theatre Network.
- Prairie Report (1988), Workshop West Theatre.
- At Sea (1990), Malaspina College Theatre.
- Farewell (1991), Workshop West Theatre.
- Kidnapping the Bride (1991), Alberta Theatre Projects.
- Brother XII (1991), Nanaimo Festival.
- Blue Trumpeter (1993), Studio Theatre.
- Supreme Dream (1995) with Rhonda Trodd, Theatre Network.
- All I Ever Wanted (1995), Nanaimo Festival.
- Tolstoy's Wife (1997), Alberta Theatre Projects.
- Weather (1999), Alberta Theatre Projects.
- Big Baby (2004), Alberta Theatre Projects.
- Run in Fields (2017), Western Edge Theatre.
- Boy Player (2025), Gabriola Theatre Festival.

=== Radio plays ===
- Down for the Weekend (1978), CBC Radio.
- Orchids and Cacti (1980), CBC Radio.
- Life Line (1982), CBC Radio.
- Janus (1984), CBC Radio.
- Restoration (1988), CBC Radio.
- City of Champions (1989), CBC Radio.
- Enemy Alien (1990), CBC Radio.

=== Musicals ===
- The Grimm Brothers' Road Show (1975) with Lawrence Reese, Theatre 3.
- Doctor Dolittle (1977) with Lawrence Reese, Northern Light Theatre.
- McLuhan: The Musical (1994) with Gerald Reid, Great Canadian Theatre Company.
- Moonbound! (2014) with Antonio Gradanti, Over the Moon Theatricals.
