= Of the Fields, Lately =

Of the Fields, Lately is a Canadian theatrical play by David French, first staged by Tarragon Theatre in 1973. It is the second in his Mercer Plays series, following Leaving Home (1972) and preceding Salt-Water Moon (1984), 1949 (1988) and Soldier’s Heart (2001).

The play centres on Ben Mercer returning home to attend his aunt's funeral, two years after the events of Leaving Home. Its original cast included Tim Henry as Ben, Sean Sullivan as his father Jacob, Florence Paterson as his mother Mary, and Sandy Webster as his aunt's widower Wiff Roach.

The play was the winner of the Floyd S. Chalmers Canadian Play Award in 1973.

The play received a Broadway production at the Century Theatre in 1980, starring Chris Cooper as Ben, William Cain as Jacob, Mary Fogarty as Mary and John Leighton as Wiff. The production was directed by Jamie Brown.

A 2009 revival of the play at Soulpepper Theatre starred Jeff Lillico as Ben, Kenneth Welsh as Jacob, Diane D'Aquila as Mary and Eric Peterson as Wiff.

== Film ==
Mike Newell directed a television film adaptation of the play, which was broadcast by CBC Television in January 1976. In the film, Sullivan and Paterson reprised their roles as Jacob and Mary, while Ben was played by R. H. Thomson and Wiff Roach was played by Gerard Parkes.

Sullivan won the Earle Grey Award for best performance in a television movie at the 6th ACTRA Awards in 1977.
