= Billy Bishop Goes to War =

1978 Canadian musical

- Music: John MacLachlan Gray
- Lyrics: John MacLachlan Gray; Eric Peterson
- Book: John MacLachlan Gray; Eric Peterson
- Basis: Life of Billy Bishop
- Productions: 1978 Vancouver; 1978 Canadian tour 1988 Canadian tour 1980 Broadway; 1980 Off Broadway; 2009 Toronto; 2010 Saskatoon; 2010 TV movie

Billy Bishop Goes to War is a Canadian musical, written by John MacLachlan Gray in collaboration with the actor Eric Peterson. One of the most widely produced plays in Canadian theatre, the two-man play dramatizes the life of Canadian World War I fighter pilot Billy Bishop. One member of the cast plays the part of Bishop in word and song, although he is also called upon to dramatize 17 other parts; the second cast member provides all the accompaniment on the piano and also sings.

== History ==
Gray and Peterson developed the music and storyline of the musical in 1978, when they were both 32. Collaborative rehearsals took place in stage designer Paul Williams's studio in Toronto.

=== Productions with the original cast ===
The play premiered at the Vancouver East Cultural Centre co-produced by Tamahnous Theatre in Vancouver, British Columbia on November 3, 1978. Peterson played 18 different characters, and Gray accompanied on piano and vocals. The original production toured across Canada, and also was staged in Washington, DC, both on Broadway and off-Broadway in New York City, at the Edinburgh Festival, in Los Angeles and at the Comedy Theatre in London. During the international tour, a second production, starring Cedric Smith with musical accompaniment by Ross Douglas, continued touring across Canada.

The libretto was published in 1981 by Talonbooks.

The show was produced on Broadway at the Morosco Theatre. Previews began on May 22, 1980. It opened on May 29, 1980 and closed on June 7, 1980, running for 12 performances and 7 previews. It then moved to Off-Broadway at the Lucille Lortel Theatre from June 17, 1980 to August 24, 1980.

In 1998, when they were 52, Gray and Peterson revised the show, adding one new song and presenting events through the eyes of a much older Bishop recalling his wartime exploits. They again toured the new production across Canada.

The show was produced at the Soulpepper Theatre in August 2009. In 2010, a second revision was made and was performed, with the original actors, at the Soulpepper Theatre in Toronto from January 22 to February 27, 2010.

In 2011 the show was performed as part of the repertory summer season at Frinton-on-Sea. The production was directed by Tom Littler. Soulpepper staged the play once again in Toronto in the summer of 2017. Gray and Peterson, by then both 70, once more made up the cast of the play.

in 2018 the show was revived by Proud Haddock and ran at the Jermyn Street Theatre and the Southwark Playhouse and was directed by Jimmy Walters.

=== Other productions ===
Many Canadian theatre companies have also staged productions of Billy Bishop with other actors, and the show has received hundreds of productions in the United States. The Persephone Theatre, Saskatoon, performed the show March 3–17, 2010. In the fall of 2010, the Citadel Theatre in Edmonton produced a revival. For his performance as Billy Bishop, John Ullyatt was awarded an Elizabeth Sterling Haynes Award.

=== Recordings and other media ===
A cast recording starring Peterson and Gray was released in 1979, and received a Juno Award nomination for Comedy Album of the Year at the Juno Awards of 1980. This production was broadcast on the cable channel Bravo as introduced by Maureen Stapleton. A recording of the revised play was released in 1999.

CBC Television and the BBC also coproduced a television adaptation. The production was reproduced for WDR Television in Germany, starring Hans Peter Korf, with Gray on piano and vocals.

A second adaption of the most recent production, directed by Barbara Willis-Sweete, premiered at the Toronto International Film Festival in 2010.

Excerpts from the play also appear in the National Film Board of Canada documentary, The Kid Who Couldn't Miss.

== Reception ==
Canadian critics have generally been enthusiastic, both about the original production, and of the various revivals brought forth by Peterson and Gray. In 2009, Eye Weekly critic Christopher Hoile observed, "The achievement of the piece is in formulating, perhaps for the first time, what a Canadian hero is like... Peterson and Gray emphasize not only how accidental Bishop's heroism is but how aware he is of his oafishness and his luck." Hoile went on to call the play "a Canadian classic that deserves the name..." In 2010, Toronto Star theatre critic Richard Ouzounian called it a "brilliant examination... One of the great works in the Canadian theatre canon."

== Awards ==
The play won the Los Angeles Drama Critics' Award in 1981, the Floyd S. Chalmers Canadian Play Award in 1982 and the Governor General's Award for English Drama in 1982. An album recording of the play was a shortlisted Juno Award nominee for Best Comedy Album at the Juno Awards of 1980.
