= Fire (musical) =

1985 musical by Paul Ledoux and David Young

Fire is a 1985 Dora Award winning musical by Paul Ledoux and David Young. The musical is based loosely on the story of Jerry Lee Lewis and his cousin Jimmy Swaggart and the divergent paths their lives took.

The musical follows the lives of the character "Cale Blackwell", based on real-life story of Jerry Lee Lewis and his brother "Herchel Blackwell" which is based on Lewis' real-life cousin Jimmy Swaggart. Herchel follows in the footsteps of his father, the reverend Blackwell's, as a preacher. Herchel's father is proud of him but does not approve of his son's use of the radio and then television while pioneering televangelism. The Reverend JD Blackwell is almost immediately disappointed with Cale who quickly finds fame as a Boogie-Woogie star and wallows in an accompanying life of rebellion against society and his own upbringing. Both brothers fall in love with their mutual childhood sweetheart "Molly King".

Ultimately neither brother can claim to have led a moral life, and both had succumbed to their own flaws.

== Characters ==
- Cale Blackwell
- Herchel Blackwell
- JD Blackwell
- Shelly Grant
- Jackson
- Sam
- Molly King
- Truman King

== Setting ==
The musical is set in the US south in the middle of the 20th century and on into the latter quarter of the 20th century.

== Awards ==
- Won Chalmers Award in 1989
- Won Dora award for Outstanding New Revue or Musical in 1989
- Won Dora award for Outstanding Production in 1989
- Won Dora award for Outstanding Direction in 1989
- Won Dora award for Outstanding Musical Direction in 1989
- Won Dora award for Outstanding Performance by a Male for Ted Dykstra in 1989
- Won Dora award for Outstanding Musical Direction in 1989
