= Marie Chouinard =

Canadian dancer, choreographer and dance company director

Marie Chouinard OC
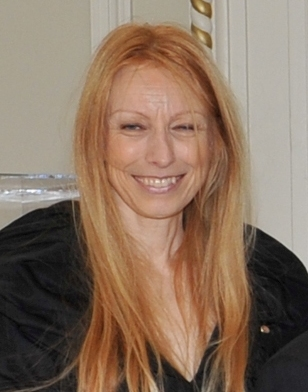
- Chouinard in 2010
- Born: May 14, 1955 (age 71); Quebec City, Quebec, Canada
- Occupations: Dancer, choreographer
- Years active: 1978–present
- Website: www.mariechouinard.com

Marie Chouinard OC (born 14 May 1955) is a Canadian dancer, choreographer, and dance company director.

== Life and work ==
In 1978, Chouinard presented her first work, Crystallization. After 12 years as a solo performer and choreographer, Chouinard founded her own company in 1990, the Compagnie Marie Chouinard. In 1988, Chouinard, along with Wim Vandekeybus and Mark Tompkins, introduced the ImPulsTanz Vienna International Dance Festival. Her son is actor Théodore Pellerin.

== Performances and solo works ==
- 1978 : Cristallisation
- 1979 : Cristallisation (les 5 cycles)
- 1979 : Dimanche matin, mai 1955
- 1979 : Danse pour un homme habillé de noir et qui porte un revolver
- 1979 : 5 Chorégraphies pour le public pieds nus
- 1979 : Les oeufs, ou autrefois il y avait, il y a longtemps, au temps où...
- 1980 : Voyages dans les limbes
- 1980 : Auto-portrait no 1
- 1980 : Auto-portrait no 2
- 1980 : Petite danse sans nom
- 1980 : Les Grenouilles
- 1980 : Mimas, Lune de Saturne
- 1980 : La Leçon
- 1980 : Dislocations
- 1980 : Chanson de gestes
- 1980 : Quelques façons d'avancer tranquillement vers toi
- 1980 : Jaune
- 1980 : Récréation
- 1980 : Dimanche matin, mai 2005
- 1980 : Conversations
- 1981 : Plaisir de tous les sens dans tous les sens
- 1981 : Danseuse-performeuse cherche amoureux ou amoureuse pour la nuit de 1er juin
- 1982 : Meat meets meat, avec Claude-Marie Caron
- 1982 : Marie Chien Noir (Mimas, Lune de Saturne; Chien Noir et Plaisirs de tous les sens dans tous les sens)
- 1984 : Table of Contents I
- 1985 : Chebre, avec Claude-Marie Caron
- 1985 : Earthquake in the Heartchakra; Table of Contents II
- 1986 : Drive in the Dragon; Crue; S.T.A.B.(Space, Time and Beyond)
- 1987 : L'Après-midi d'un faune
- 1988 : Biophilia
- 1989 : Poèmes d'atmosphère
- 1990 : Lettre ouverte à Terpsichore
- 1992 : Endangered species; Cet instant-ci et l'éternité; Terpsichore a cappella
- 2010 : Lingam, Campagne
- 2012 : In Museum

== Choreography works ==
- 1978 : Cristallisation
- 1982 : Marie chien noir
- 1990 : Les Trous du ciel
- 1993 : Le Sacre du printemps
- 1994 : Prélude à l'Après-midi d'un faune
- 1996 : L'Amande et le Diamant
- 1998 : Les Solos 1978-1998
- 1998 : Étude poignante
- 1998 : Humanitas
- 1999 : Les 24 préludes de Chopin
- 2000 : Le Cri du monde
- 2002 : Étude #1, Des feux dans la nuit
- 2004 : Chorale
- 2005 : Mouvements
- 2006 : Body Remix / Les Variations Golberg
- 2008 : Orphée et Eurydice
- 2009 : Gloires du matin
- 2008 : Le Nombre d'or
- 2016 : Soft Virtuosity, Still Humid, on the Edge
- 2017 : Le Jardin des délices, transposition de l'œuvre de Jérôme Bosch
- 2023 : M
- 2025 : LA COMPAGNIE MARIE CHOUINARD EN CARAVANE
- 2025 : MAGNIFICAT
- 2025 : BodyremixRemix

== Works in repertory of other companies ==
- 2003 : Prelude to the afternoon of a faun and The Rite of the Spring/Ballet Gulbenkian, Portugal
- 2008 : 24 preludes by Chopin/ Ballet national de Toronto, Canada
- 2009 : Prelude to the afternoon of a faun/São Paulo Companhia de Dança, Brésil

== Film ==
- 2003 : Cantique no 1
- 2008 : bODY_rEMIX/gOLDBERG_vARIATIONS (produced by Amérimage-Spectra and realized by Marie Chouinard)

== Multiscreen film ==
- 2003 : Cantique no 2

== Installations ==
- 2004 : Cantique no 3 (participative installation created with Louis Dufort)
- 2009 : Icônes (video installation created with Luc Courchesne)

== Bibliography ==
Monographs 2008 : Chantier des extases (poetry), les Éditions du passage (Montréal)

2010 : Compagnie Marie Chouinard, Les Éditions du passage (Montréal)

2010 : morning glories :)-(:, Editions Compagnie Marie Chouinard

== Awards and distinctions ==
- 1981 - Studio du Québec à New York (Gouvernement du Québec), first recipient
- 1986 - Prize Jacqueline-Lemieux
- 1987 - Prize Jean A. Chalmers de chorégraphie
- 1993 - Artist Lifetime Achievement Award
- 1994 - Prize Boat Award (Glasgow, Scotland) for The Rite of the Spring
- 2000 - Bessie Award for sustained achievement (New York)
- 2003 - The French Society of Dramatic Authors and Composers award (SACD), Paris
- 2003 - The movie Cantique no 1 receives a prize at the Moving Pictures Festival of Danse on Film and Video, Toronto (performance prize for Carol Prieur and Benoît Lachambre)
- 2003 - National Arts Center Award, a companion award of the Governor General's Performing Arts Awards
- 2006 - Archangel Award for Le vol de Lindbergh and Les 7 Péchés capitaux, choreographed by Marie Chouinard, Edinburgh Festival
- 2006 - Grand Prix du Conseil des Arts de Montreal for the Company's impact on Montreal dance and is workbODY_rEMIX/gOLDBERG_vARIATIONS
- 2007 - Officier of the Ordre of Canada
- 2009 - Gemini Award (Best Performance in a Performing Arts Program or Series) awarded to Compagnie Marie Chouinard dancers for their performance in the movie bODY_rEMIX/gOLDBERG_vARIATIONS
- 2009 - Chevalier of the Ordre des Arts et des Lettres, France
- 2010 - Compagnie Marie Chouinard was awarded by the Imperial Tobacco Foundation's Arts Achievement Award 2010
- 2010 - Prix du Québec (Denise Pelletier Prize)
- 2010 - The name of Marie Chouinard became a dictionary entry in Le Petit Larousse illustré
- 2011 - The name of Marie Chouinard became a dictionary entry in Le Robert
- 2012 - Queen Elizabeth II Diamond Jubilee Medal
- 2012 - Conseil des arts et des lettres du Québec Award for best choreography work for THE GOLDEN MEAN (LIVE)
- 2014 - Prix Samuel de Champlain
- 2015 - Knight of the National Order of Quebec
- 2015 - Ordre des arts et des lettres du Québec
- 2016 - Lifetime Achievement Award, Dance, Governor General's Performing Arts Awards
- 2016 - Positano Prize "Choreographer of the Year"
- 2016 : Walter Carsen Prize for Excellence in the Performing Arts
- 2016 : Prize for best international work for the film MARIE CHOUINARD: THE RITE OF SPRING, 20th “Coreografo Elettronico” International Festival of Video-dance
- 2020 - Officer of Arts and Letters (France)
- 2023 - Unveiling of her star on the Walk of Fame of Sibiu (Romania)
- 2023 - Marie Chouinard is one of the featured dancers in the book "Danseuses, 50 héroïnes" (Éditions Scala, France)
- 2024 - Induction into the Dance Collection Danse Hall of Fame (Canada)
