= Possible Worlds (play) =

1990 play by John Mighton

Possible Worlds is a play written in 1990 by John Mighton. The author, Mighton, is a mathematician and philosopher. His plays tend to meld science, drama and math into one cohesive piece. It is part murder mystery, part science-fiction, and part mathematical philosophy and follows the multiple parallel lives of the main character George Barber. Mighton, a mathematician from University of Toronto's Fields Institute, brought his considerable professional experience to bear on the writing of the play.

At the play's beginning, George is found dead, with his brain missing. Two detectives set out to uncover the truth behind his grisly death, and stumble upon several strange characters. This play may be classified as a sci-fi tragic drama The play itself does not have any music.

Possible Worlds won a Governor General's Literary Award for Drama in 1992 alongside Short History of Night.

A film adaptation of the same name was released in 2000. Directed by Robert Lepage and starring Tom McCamus and Tilda Swinton, it garnered wide critical acclaim, won two Genie Awards, and was nominated for a further four. The theatre book was published in 1997 by Playwrights Canada Press.

The play bears many conceptual similarities to Tom Stoppard's Hapgood, a play about spies and secret agents that takes place primarily in the men's changingroom of a municipal swimming baths.

== Production history (selected) ==
- Canadian Stage Company, Toronto, Ontario, Canada – Premiere 1990
- Dionysus and Apollo Stage company, Dallas, Texas – 1997
- Dr. Betty Mitchell Theatre, Calgary, Alberta, Canada –1999
- Chicago Cultural Center Studio Theater, Chicago, Illinois – 1999
- Company of the Silvershield, Toronto, Ontario, Canada - 2000
- The group at Strasberg, Lee Strasberg Creative Center, Hollywood, California – 2001
- Tron Theatre, Glasgow, Scotland – 2002
- Hart House Theatre, Toronto, Canada – 2004
- Sullivan Mahoney Court House Theatre, Ontario, Canada – 2008
- Wakefield Players Theater Company, Wakefield, Quebec, Canada - 2009
- Stratford Festival Studio Theatre, Stratford, Ontario - 2015
- Fix Theatre, Iași, Romania - 2015

== Plot synopsis ==
The play begins with detectives Berkley and Williams at a crime scene where a man, identified as George Barber, has been murdered, the top of his head cut off and his brain stolen.

One of the detective is interviewing a neuroscientist (who we learn at the end of the play is named Pensfield) specializing on research of the nervous system. Pensfield has many brains in jars hooked up to life support and lights in his lab. He tells how a rat can only imagine so much and is limited by the structure of its brain. Creatures like humans that can anticipate possible futures and make contingency plans have an evolutionary advantage, according to him.

In what seems a flashback, George meets Joyce, a scientist, at a bar. This time he is luckier because she does not flat out reject his advances, rather invites George to call her. Joyce is doing research on how to improve intelligence and her specialization is in rat cortexes. Williams and Berkley are in their office with a rat brain from Pensfield's lab. Williams tells Berkley about a course his wife wants him to take to increase intelligence and imagination.

George is back with Joyce, this time a stockbroker. He mismatches Joyce the stockbroker with Joyce the scientist about where they were born. George also tells Joyce about a dream with the slab and block men. In this dream, there is the Guide who is Pensfield. George and Joyce, now the scientist, are at her apartment filled with the same kind of stones that were in George's dream. George convinces the workaholic Joyce to take time off from work and go to the beach with him.

Williams is listening to a tape from meditation teacher Jocelyn when Berkley interrupts him. They are visited by the caretaker of George's Building. He tells them about seeing a UFO the night that George died and fears that “they” will kill him too. Later, they will find him frozen to death without a logical explanation.

Joyce is looking at a picture of the beach while telling George about a demonstration that was being held outside her lab in response to one of colleague's work. Her college is keeping an ape's brain alive. George is back with stockbroker Joyce who breaks up with him because she has been seeing someone else. Williams and Berkley talk about Louise, the rat brain. William feels bad for Louise and decides to take the brain back to the scientist because he is the only one who can “help” her.

George meets Joyce the scientist on a beach. She does not know George and she has a boyfriend. George tries to tell her that they were once married and lived together and it freaks her out. Joyce insists that he has her mixed up with someone else and tries to run from George. George attacks Joyce. He is then with a doctor who is Pensfield. George says when he's dreaming, he sometimes thinks he is falling asleep.

Williams comes into the office and tells Berkley he has found the missing brains and Pensfield had them all along. He is arrested. Joyce Barber, George's real life wife, is met by the detectives and told that her husband's brain is alive and producing rudimentary consciousness in a very discontinuous “fluctuating dream state”.

George is again with Joyce on the beach. They see a blinking light in the ocean that goes out shortly afterwards before they can figure out what it was. The light is reminiscent of the light that came on with brain activity, suggesting the real Joyce agreed to terminate George consciousness.

== Style ==
Possible Worlds is a Post Modern Expressionist piece in that neither the relationship with the viewer or the subject is stable. The scenes are disjointed and it disrupts continuity which is what creates that unstable relationship with the viewer which can also put the play under the Style of Modernism.

This play has many elements of many styles. At times it is mood driven and we are dealing with the hidden world inside George's brain which would symbolism. But George is on a quest towards clarity and the setting is inside the main character's mind, although most of the play we do not know that but nonetheless the play is mostly expressionistic.

Possible worlds is also specifically post modern in that the setting varies and is somewhat unpredictable, the world are artificial and the meaning of the play comes with knowing the context.

The biggest Spectacle on stage in this play would be the image of the human and rat brain in glass containers hooked up to wires and lights.

== Language ==
The language used in the play is modern but uses very little slang. During the scene with the block and slab men you hear throughout the scene the men saying “block” and “slab”. The Language that is used does not tend to have any elements of euphonic, but symbols tend to be fairly prevalent.

Subtle hints in the script are what let us know what is really going on. Without certain lines like when George says, “I’m in a case.” He is not saying figuratively but it sees to be so, but he is literally in a case, his body in a casket and his brain in a jar at a science lab.

== Character guide ==
- George – In his 30s
- Joyce – In her 30s
- Berkley – A detective
- Williams – Berkley's assistant
- Penfield – A neuroscientist
- Additional Characters:
  - Man (caretaker)
  - Guide
  - Scientist
  - Doctor
  - Jocelyn

== Theme ==
Possible Worlds addresses many controversial topics regarding today's scientific advancements and the moral issues that relate to it. A main overriding theme is human emotions and how they are constructed and what they mean. This theme is there to be questioned not to be answered.

Another main theme is that of the human consciousness and how the brain is able to construct it. This play is asking whether we should be allowed to figure out exactly how the brain works, essentially pitting every emotion thought and movement to a function in the brain, essentially turning all the mystery in to the light and making the brain seem like a machine. This is a controversial idea because to many people who study religion this could debunk their religious teachings. Religions tend to heavily rely on the idea of a spirit or a soul and if the brain were demystified then there would most likely be no room for a soul and this could lead to a large rebellion against the church. By keeping the brain human and not a machine it leaves room for a “miracle” or other unexplained happening which leaves room for religion. With the advancements in science we will most likely some day know exactly how the brain works but right now we are far from the answer but get closer all the time. The biggest road block is going to be with human testing because it is seen as immoral but without it the advancements in science may not happen. Whether that is to be allowed is a question up to the moral of the human populace as a whole.

== Plot analysis ==
Possible Worlds was written in such a way that it will be relevant to any era that is making advancements in neuroscience.

This play opens up your mind to the possibilities of alternate dimensions, social constructs or worlds and then throws it to the ground in the end when all of it was a construct of the imagination. This play explores the human consciousness, morals and scientific advancement all in one, while adding a bit of romance.

Possible Worlds is very discontinuous and hard to follow at times and the viewer must pay close attention to pick up the very subtle messages and themes.

== Character analysis ==
George is the main character. He is in his 30s and in his “real life” is married to Joyce. George is a stock broker and is brilliant at math. He discovered at a young age about alternate lives that he could live when he was young doing a math problem, or so he says. In reality all of this is constructed inside George's brain and never really takes place as far as we can tell. George is the Protagonist of the play although some of his actions throughout the play pose as blocks to what he wants. What he wants is to be loved by Joyce and be in a relationship with Joyce in every world that he encounters. George is also a semi-static character as far as the worlds go. George is always George while other characters appear in way that they would not in the real world. George stays the same through the play so that the viewer can connect with him and feel bad for him at the end. He is the only main “human” character because of how he does not really change from one world to the next. Joyce is George's real life wife. In every world he pursues her. Sometimes he is successful and sometimes not. Joyce is a scientist on some worlds, a stock broker in others and in one entirely different construct she is Jocelyn, the teacher of a meditation type class focused at increasing intelligence through imagination. Joyce is one of the main antagonists of the play in most worlds. Especially in the world where she has a boyfriend because George can not reach his goal at all in the world. Joyce is also an agent of action because without her decisions George could not further pursue his goals or change his tactics to pursue new goals. Berkley and Williams are detectives and they are in the real world. They are the voice of Justice and the morals in the world. They are pitted against the scientist and they tend to show that they feel bad for the brains being kept alive by Pensfield. They question Pensfield right to experiment on the brains while searching for the murderer of their case who turns out to be Pensfield. Pensfield is the neuroscientist who is killing people and stealing their brains. In this plot line, which includes Berkley and Williams he is not only the antagonist but the bad guy. Pensfield shows up throughout the play as the Guide, the Scientist and the Doctor. Pensfield causes discomfort in the characters and the viewer and forces them to think about questions in morality, especially concerning science and man. The question that immediately jumps out is, is it ok to kill in the name of scientific advancement? The man is the caretaker of George's building. He goes to the detectives with a story of seeing UFO lights the night that George was killed. They don't believe him of course even when he says that “they” are going to kill him. Later the man shows up dead, frozen to death at room temperature which makes the detectives question what they are dealing with in these cases.

== See also ==
- Simulated reality
