= John MacLachlan Gray =

Canadian writer, composer and performer (born 1946)

- Born: John Howard Gray; 1946 (age 79–80); Ottawa, Ontario, Canada
- Education: Mount Allison University; University of British Columbia
- Occupations: Writer, composer and performer
- Website: johnmaclachlangray.ca

John MacLachlan Gray, OC (born John Howard Gray, 1946) is a Canadian writer-composer-performer for stage, TV, film, radio and print. He is best known for his stage musicals and for his two seasons as a satirist on CBC TV's The Journal, as well as an author, speaker and social critic on cultural-political issues.

== Early life and education ==
John MacLachlan Gray was born in 1946 in Ottawa, Ontario, and was raised in Nova Scotia.

He obtained a B.A. degree at Mount Allison University, and an M.A. at the University of British Columbia (UBC).

== Career ==
While attending UBC, Gray founded Tamahnous Theatre, and served as its director from 1971 to 1974. He then joined Theatre Passe Muraille in Toronto, Ontario, where he began writing and composing for the stage. His first musical was 18 Wheels, about truck drivers.

=== Plays ===
In 1978, with Eric Peterson, he wrote and composed Billy Bishop Goes to War, which appeared on Broadway in New York City in 1980, produced by Mike Nichols, and in London's West End. It has since been performed in more than 150 independent productions in Canada and the United States. The play appeared on television in a BBC-CBC co-production, and in a German version, Billy Bishop Steig Auf. Billy Bishop Goes to War was the winner of the Los Angeles Drama Critics Award in 1981, the Governor General's Award for Drama, and the 1982 Floyd S. Chalmers Canadian Play Award.

In 2009, Peterson and Gray returned to their roles at Soulpepper Theater in Toronto, in a re-mounting where Bishop tells his story, wearing pajamas and dressing-gown, near the end of his life. Directed by Ted Dykstra, the production received rave reviews, and continues to be performed at Soulpepper and at other venues across Canada.

In 2010, the play was shot for CBC Television in partnership with Strada Productions, directed by Barbara Willis-Sweete.

=== Musicals ===
Gray has written and composed six other musicals including 18 Wheels, Rock and Roll, Don Messer's Jubilee, Health, and Amelia: The Girl Who Wants to Fly (2011). Rock and Roll won a Dora Mavor Moore Award in 1982, and became an award-winning feature video entitled King of Friday Night.

Gray's most recent musical is TheTree. TheTower. TheFlood, three Bible stories for the age of information, commissioned by CBC Radio Drama.

=== Journalism ===
In the late 1990s, Gray became a newspaper columnist, contributing weekly pieces on cultural politics to the Vancouver Sun and The Globe and Mail. In the early 2000s, he contributed a column to Western Living Magazine called "O For the Love of Dog", in which he wrote about his dog Gus.

=== Novels ===
Gray then abandoned the theatre in favour of the novel – in a series of thrillers set in post-modern Vancouver, mid-19th-century England and the United States before the Civil War. As with Billy Bishop Goes to War, Gray casts an ironic contemporary eye on imagined historical events.

== Recognition and awards ==
Gray is the recipient of a Golden Globe, as well as the Governor General's Medal.

In 2000, he was made an Officer of the Order of Canada for "his contribution to Canada's cultural landscape". He holds honorary doctorates from Dalhousie University and Mount Allison University.

Other awards received by Gray include:

- Los Angeles Drama Critics' Dramalogue Award
- Gold Award, New York Film and Television Festival
- ACTRA Award (Nellie), Best Production, 1983
- Canadian Film and Television Award
- Silver Hugo Award, Chicago
- Rocky Award, Banff Television Festival, Best Variety Production
- National Magazine Award
- Dora Mavor Moore Award (2)
- Western Magazine Award (6)

== Bibliography ==
- Billy Bishop Goes to War – 1982 (with Eric Peterson)
- Dazzled! – 1984
- Local Boy Makes Good – 1987
- I Love Mom: An Irreverent History of the Tattoo – 1994
- Lost in North America: The Imaginary Canadian in the American Dream – 1994
- A Gift for the Little Master – 2000
- The Fiend in Human – 2003
  - in German: Der menschliche Dämon. Transl. Edith Walter. Heyne Verlag 2005
- White Stone Day – 2005
- Not Quite Dead − 2007
- The White Angel – 2017
- Vile Spirits – 2021
- . "Mr. Good-Evening" - 2024
