= John Mighton =

Canadian mathematician, playwright and author

John Mighton, O.C. born in Hamilton, Ontario, Canada on October 2, 1957, is a Canadian mathematician, playwright and best-selling author, who is known for his work to support children's successful math education. Mighton founded JUMP Math as a charity in 2002 and developed the JUMP Math program to address student underachievement in math. Mighton has won national and international awards for his contributions to both math education and Canadian theatre as an internationally recognized playwright.

In 1997 Mighton played a mathematician in the film Good Will Hunting.

== Education ==
Mighton earned a BA (Philosophy) at the University of Toronto (1978) and a MA (Philosophy) at McMaster University (1984)., later earning a PhD (Mathematics) at the University of Toronto. He was awarded an NSERC fellowship for his postdoctoral research in knot and graph theory. He is a Fellow of the Fields Institute for Research in Mathematical Sciences and has taught mathematics and math education at the University of Toronto. Mighton has also lectured in philosophy at McMaster University.

== Career ==
Mighton's plays have been performed in theatres worldwide and have been honoured with multiple awards, including the Siminovitch Prize in Theatre, two Governor General’s Literary Awards for Drama, three Dora Awards, and the Chalmers Award. His plays include: Possible Worlds, The Little Years, Body & Soul, Scientific Americans, A Short History of Night, and Half Life.

In 1997, Mighton was the math consultant and also played the role of “Tom”, an assistant to the math professor, in the critically acclaimed film, Good Will Hunting.

In 1998, Mighton started a small-scale tutoring group to assist children experiencing challenges in math, though he had abandoned the subject himself for years after struggling with math in school and nearly failing first-year calculus in university.

In 2002 Mighton founded JUMP (Junior Undiscovered Math Prodigies) Math, a Canadian charitable organization with the mission to enable every child to learn and love math.

Mighton has written three books on math, based on his expertise and experiences with JUMP Math, including The Myth of Ability: Nurturing Mathematical Talent in Every Child (2003), which describes his approach and successes with JUMP Math; The End of Ignorance: Multiplying Our Human Potential (2007) as a further exploration of his philosophy and methods; and All Things Being Equal: Why Math is the Key to a Better World (2020).

== Awards and honors ==
- Margaret Sinclair Memorial Award for Innovation & Excellence, The Fields Institute for Research in Mathematical Sciences (2022)
- Adrien Pouliot Award for Outstanding Contributions to Math Education, Canadian Mathematical Society (2022)
- President’s Award, Professional Engineers Ontario (2020)
- WISE Award for Innovation in Education (2016)
- 10th Annual Egerton Ryerson Award for Dedication to Public Education (2016)
- Schwab Foundation Social Entrepreneur of the Year (2015)
- Ernst & Young Social Entrepreneur of the Year (2014)
- Officer of the Order of Canada (2010)
- Ashoka Fellow (2004)

== Publications ==
- Possible Worlds (1990)
- The Myth of Ability (2003)
- The End of Ignorance (2007)
- A Short History of Night (2007)
- Half-Life (2005)
- The little years (2012)
- Kids JUMP for Math, Scientific American Mind (2013)
- All Things Being Equal: Why Math Is the Key to a Better World (2020)

== Filmography ==
- Good Will Hunting (1997): Tom - Lambeau's Teaching Assistant
