= David Young (Canadian playwright) =

Canadian playwright, novelist, and screenwriter

David Samuel D'Arcy Young (born 17 July 1946 Oakville, Ontario) is a Canadian playwright, novelist, and screenwriter.

Born in Oakville, Ontario, Young studied at the University of Western Ontario. He is the author of seven plays, two novels and several screenplays and teleplays. Two of his plays, Inexpressible Island and Glenn, have been nominated for multiple Canadian drama awards. The play, Fire, received four Dora Mavor Moore Awards as well as the Chalmers/Toronto Drama Bench Award.

Young is also a founder of the Writers' Trust of Canada, a non-profit literary organization that seeks to encourage Canada's writing community, and a trustee of the Griffin Prize for Excellence in Poetry.

== Plays ==
- Love Is Strange (1985), a theatrical study of the life and times of Robert Kieling, the star-struck farmer from Saskatchewan who has spent his adult life in mental institutions because he believes he and singer Anne Murray are in love.
- Fire (1986), a political musical inspired by cousins Jimmy Swaggart and Jerry Lee Lewis, co-written with Paul Ledoux. The play received four Dora Mavor Moore Awards as well as the Chalmers/Toronto Drama Bench Award.
- Glenn (1992), a theatrical portrait of pianist Glenn Gould.
- Inexpressible Island (1997), a play about six men marooned in an ice cave in Antarctica.
- An Enemy of the People (2001), an adaptation of Henrik Ibsen's play.
- Clout (2001), a comedy about men, sex and power.
- No Great Mischief (2004), an adaptation of the award-winning Alistair MacLeod novel.

== Teleplays ==
- Fraggle Rock, eleven episodes (1983–1987)
