= David French (playwright) =

Canadian writer (1939–2010)

- Born: David Benson French; 18 January 1939; Coley's Point, Newfoundland
- Died: 5 December 2010 (aged 71); Toronto, Ontario
- Occupation: Playwright

David Benson French, OC (January 18, 1939 – December 5, 2010) was a Canadian playwright, most noted for his "Mercer Plays" series of Leaving Home, Of the Fields, Lately, Salt-Water Moon, 1949 and Soldier's Heart.

== Early life ==
French was born in the tiny Newfoundland outport of Coley's Point, the middle child in a family of five boys. His father, Garfield French, was a carpenter, and during World War II worked for the Eastern Air Command in Canada. After the war, David's mother, Edith, came to Ontario with the boys to join their father and the family settled in Toronto among a thriving community of Newfoundland immigrants.

French attended Rawlinson Public School, Harbord Collegiate, and Oakwood Collegiate. He was indifferent to books until Grade 8, when his English teacher, to punish him for talking in class, told French to sit down and read a book. The book David happened to pull off the shelf was Mark Twain’s The Adventures of Tom Sawyer. French says that by the time he finished reading it, he not only knew that he wanted to be a writer – he knew that he was one. Almost immediately he began to publish original stories and poems.

After high school, French trained as an actor. He spent a summer at the Pasadena Playhouse, and studied at various acting studios in Toronto. In the early 1960s, he played roles on stage and in CBC television dramas. Then he began writing for television. Over the next several years he wrote many half-hour dramas, including The Tender Branch, A Ring for Florie, Beckons the Dark River, Sparrow on a Monday Morning, and The Willow Harp. He also wrote episodes of the popular children’s program Razzle Dazzle.

== Work for the stage ==
=== The Mercer family play cycle ===
In 1971, he became aware of a new theatre, the Tarragon in Toronto, that was producing David Freeman's play Creeps. After seeing the play, French was so impressed that he called the director, Bill Glassco, and asked him to read a play he had been working on, Leaving Home (1972). Glasco produced the play and it filled the final slot in the Tarragon’s first season. A collaboration between the two men followed which lasted for over thirty years, with Glassco directing each of French’s premiere productions.

Leaving Home is a landmark play in Canadian theatre history. After its very successful run in Toronto in 1972, the play went on to be produced at virtually every regional theatre in the country – the first Canadian play ever to do so. It also received many international productions, including an off-Broadway run. Leaving Home is taught in high schools and universities across Canada, and is one of the most familiar of Canadian plays. It was named one of the "100 Most Influential Canadian Books" by the Literary Review of Canada) and one of the "1,000 Essential Plays in the English Language" in the Oxford Dictionary of Theatre. Leaving Home introduced audiences to the Mercer family, who would come to figure largely in David's work. The Mercers, like the Frenches, were a Newfoundland family transplanted to Toronto.

Of the Fields, Lately (1973), French's sequel to Leaving Home, also produced at the Tarragon, won the Chalmers Award for 1973. "I wrote it because people kept asking me what happened to the Mercers after Ben leaves home," said French. It was adapted for CBC Television and was produced across Canada and abroad, including a critically acclaimed run in Argentina (in a Spanish translation) and a production on Broadway.

French eventually wrote five plays about the Mercer family. Salt-Water Moon (1984), the third play, is a poetic drama about the courtship of the parents, set in Newfoundland in 1926. Salt-Water Moon has had hundreds of productions since its original run. The French-language version, translated by Antonine Maillet, has been produced across Canada. Salt-Water Moon won the Canadian Authors Association Award for Drama, the Dora Mavor Moore Award for Best New Play, and the Hollywood Drama-Logue Critics' Award.

1949 (1988), a fond look at the extended Mercer clan as Newfoundland prepares to join Confederation, premiered at CentreStage, and Soldier's Heart, which explores the effect of the First World War on two generations of Mercers, was produced at the Tarragon in 2001. Toronto's Soulpepper Theatre has done acclaimed revivals of Leaving Home and Salt-Water Moon, with a Of The Fields, Lately revival running during the summer of 2010.

=== Other work ===
The immensely popular backstage comedy Jitters (1979) has been regularly revived in Canada, and enjoyed a six-month run at the Long Wharf Theatre in New Haven, Connecticut. Other works include the memory play That Summer (1999), which opened the Blyth Festival's 25th Anniversary Season; the mystery-thriller Silver Dagger (1993), a finalist for the Arthur Ellis Award; One Crack Out (1975) a pool-hall drama produced in Toronto and off-Broadway, and the comedy The Riddle of the World (1981). All of his plays have been published and are in print. (Talonbooks and Anansi).

French also undertook translations of Miss Julie (August Strindberg), The Forest (Alexander Ostrovsky), and of Anton Chekhov's The Seagull, a version of which was produced on Broadway starring Laura Linney, Ethan Hawke, Jon Voight, and Tyne Daly. French was helped by Russian scholars when preparing the latter two texts.

As a senior playwright, David mentored many aspiring writers. He was writer-in-residence at the University of Windsor (2007/08) and The University of Western Ontario (2002/03), and has done a short-term residency at Trent University in Peterborough, Ontario. He taught a course in playwriting each summer at the Prince Edward Island (PEI) Conservatory. He also gave Canada Council-sponsored readings from coast to coast, and often visited high schools and universities that were studying his plays. French's work is popular with community theatre groups across North America.

David French was the first inductee in the Newfoundland Arts Hall of Honour. He received the Queen's Jubilee Medal, and the Harold, (a Toronto theatre peer award). He was named an Officer of the Order of Canada in 2001.

He died in Toronto on December 5, 2010, from brain cancer.

== Works ==
- Leaving Home - 1972
- Of the Fields, Lately - 1973
- One Crack Out - 1975
- The Seagull - 1977
- Jitters - 1979
- The Riddle of the World - 1981
- Salt-Water Moon - 1985 (nominated for a Governor General's Award)
- 1949 - 1989
- The Silver Dagger - 1993
- That Summer - 2000
- Soldier's Heart - 2003
- Miss Julie - 2005

== Literature ==
- Bauch, Marc A. (2012), Canadian self-perception and self-representation in English-Canadian drama after 1967, Köln, Germany: Wiku Verlag, ISBN 9783865534071
