= Esmeralda =

Esmeralda may refer to:

== Places ==
- Esmeralda, Queensland, a locality in the Shire of Croydon, Australia
- Esmeralda Municipality, Oruro Department, Bolivia
- Esmeralda, Rio Grande do Sul, a municipality in Brazil
- Esmeralda, a town in Chile
- Esmeralda Island, Chile
- Esmeralda, Cuba
- Esmeralda County, Nevada, United States

== Arts and entertainment ==
=== The Hunchback of Notre Dame ===
- Esmeralda (The Hunchback of Notre-Dame), a character in Victor Hugo's novel and its adaptations
- Esmeralda (Battista), an 1856 opera by Vincenzo Battista
- Esmeralda (Thomas), an 1883 English opera by Arthur Goring Thomas
- La Esmeralda (opera), a 1836 French opera by Louise Bertin
- La Esmeralda (ballet), an 1844 ballet
- Esmeralda (Dargomyzhsky), an 1847 opera by Alexander Dargomyzhsky
- Esmeralda (1905 film), a French short silent film
- Esmeralda (1922 film), a British silent film

=== Television ===
- Esmeralda (Mexican TV series), a telenovela on El Canal de las Estrellas
- Esmeralda (Venezuelan TV series), a program broadcast by Venevisión
- Esmeralda (Brazilian TV series), a program on Sistema Brasileiro de Televisão
- Maggie Esmerelda, a character from American Horror Story: Freak Show
- Esmeralda, a character from Bewitched
- Esmeralda (Cro character)
- Esmeralda, a secondary villain in the anime Saint October
- Esmeralda, a character from the anime series Saint Seiya

=== Other arts and entertainment ===
- Esmeralda (1915 film), a film based on an 1880s play of the same name
- Esmeralda (Fur Fighters), a character from the Fur Fighters video game
- Esmeralda, a character from the 1947 novel Doctor Faustus by Thomas Mann
- Esmerelda Weatherwax, a Discworld character
- Esmeralda, servant of Tarzan in Tarzan of the Apes
- "Esmeralda", a poem by Nikos Kavvadias
- Esmeralda, a seal in the 1954 film 20,000 Leagues Under the Sea

== Ships ==
- Esmeralda (carrack), a Portuguese carrack which sank in 1503, the earliest ship found to date from Europe’s Age of Discovery
- Spanish frigate Esmeralda, a Spanish frigate captured by Chile in 1820
- Chilean corvette Esmeralda, a steam corvette of the Chilean Navy, sunk during the War of the Pacific
- Esmerelda (sternwheeler), a steamboat on the Colorado River
- Chilean cruiser Esmeralda (1883), the world's first protected cruiser
- Chilean cruiser Esmeralda (1896), an armored cruiser
- Chilean frigate Esmeralda (1944), originally HMCS Glace Bay, a corvette transferred to the Chilean Navy in 1946
- Chilean barquentine Esmeralda, a training ship of the Chilean Navy, launched in 1953

== Other uses ==
- Esmeralda (given name)
- Esmeralda (plant), a genus of orchids
- Esmeralda (beetle), a genus of beetles
- Esmeralda (Mexibús), a BRT station in Ecatepec de Morelos, Mexico
- Esmeralda Avenue (disambiguation)
- Esmeralda Open, a golf tournament on the PGA Tour that was played in the 1940s
- Escuela Nacional de Pintura, Escultura y Grabado "La Esmeralda", an educational institution for plastic arts
- Esmeralda language, an extinct language from Ecuador
- Esmeralda Peaks, a mountain in Washington state, United States

== See also ==
- Santa Esmeralda, a 1970s musical group
- Miss Esmeralda, an 1887 Victorian burlesque on Victor Hugo's work, with music by Meyer Lutz and a libretto by Fred Leslie
- La Esmeralda (disambiguation)
- Esmeraldas (disambiguation)
