= Vancouver Playhouse production history =

The Vancouver Playhouse Theatre Company was a regional Canadian theatre company, producing plays from 1962 to 2012. The following is a list of the productions that have been staged since its inception to its final season of 2011–2012.

== 2011–2012 ==
Mainstage

- Tosca Cafe (formerly The Tosca Project) – Created and staged by Carey Perloff and Val Caniparoli. An American Conservatory Theater (San Francisco) production.
- La Cage aux Folles – Music & Lyrics by Jerry Herman. Book by Harvey Fierstein. Based on the play La Cage aux Folles by Jean Poiret.
- Red – By John Logan. Directed by Kim Collier.
- Catalyst Theatre’s Hunchback – Conceived by Jonathan Christenson and Bretta Gerecke. Adapted from Victor Hugo's novel. Originally commissioned by the Citadel Theatre (Edmonton).
- God of Carnage – By Yasmina Reza. Translated by Christopher Hampton.

Recital Hall

- Gunmetal Blues – Book by Scott Wentworth. Music & Lyrics by Craig Bohmler and Marion Adler.
- The Exquisite Hour – By Stewart Lemoine - Not Presented. Presented instead at the Arts Club Theatre, Revue Stage.

Theatre for Young Audiences

- The Cat Came Back – Co-Created by Fred Penner, Jay Brazeau and Kim Selody - Not Presented. Replacement concerts instead performed by Fred Penner and Friends at the Vancouver Playhouse and SFU Woodwards.

== 2010–2011 ==
- The Fantasticks – Book and Lyrics by Tom Jones; Music by Harvey Schmidt, Directed and Choreographed by Max Reimer
- Noël Coward's Brief Encounter – Adapted for the stage by Emma Rice, Directed by Max Reimer
- This – Written by Melissa James Gibson, Directed by Amiel Gladstone
- Death of a Salesman – Written by Arthur Miller, Directed by John Cooper
- The Trespassers – Written by Morris Panych Directed by Ron Jenkins
- MacHomer – Created and Performed by Rick Miller

== 2009–2010 ==
- The Miracle Worker – by William Gibson (playwright)
- Dirty Rotten Scoundrels – music and lyrics by David Yazbek and a book by Jeffrey Lane
- Beyond Eden – by Bruce Ruddell
- Delusion – by Laurie Anderson
- The Love List – by Norm Foster
- Dangerous Corner – by J. B. Priestley

== 2008–2009 ==
- Frost/Nixon – by Peter Morgan
- The Drowsy Chaperone – book by Bob Martin and Don McKellar and music and lyrics by Lisa Lambert and Greg Morrison
- Miss Julie: Freedom Summer – by August Strindberg, adapted by Stephen Sachs
- Toronto, Mississippi – by Joan MacLeod
- Top Girls – by Caryl Churchill
- Studies in Motion – by Kevin Kerr

== 2007–2008 ==
- The Wars – by Timothy Findley
- Oliver! – by Lionel Bart
- The Blonde, the Brunette and the Vengeful Redhead – by Robert Hewett
- The Amorous Adventures of Anatol – by Arthur Schnitzler
- True West – by Sam Shepard

== 2005–2006 ==
- The Syringa Tree – by Pamela Gien
- A Little Night Music – lyrics by Stephen Sondheim, book by Hugh Wheeler
- Vincent in Brixton – by Nicholas Wright
- I Am My Own Wife – by Doug Wright
- No Great Mischief – by David S. Young

== 2004–2005 ==
- Joni Mitchell: River – by Allan McInnis
- Noises Off – by Michael Frayn
- Humble Boy – by Charlotte Jones
- Copenhagen – by Michael Frayn
- Trying – by Joanna Glass

== 2003–2004 ==
- Stones in His Pockets – by Marie Jones
- Hello, Dolly! – book by Michael Stewart, music & lyrics by Jerry Herman
- Arms and the Man – by George Bernard Shaw
- One Last Kiss – by Aaron Bushkowsky
- Equus – by Peter Shaffer
- Cloud Tectonics – by Jose Rivera

== 2002–2003 ==
- Proof – by David Auburn
- Fiddler on the Roof – book by Joseph Stein, music by Jerry Bock, lyrics by Sheldon Harnick
- Mary's Wedding – by Stephen Massicotte
- Romeo and Juliet – by William Shakespeare
- The Caretaker – by Harold Pinter
- Earshot – by Morris Panych
- Asylum of the Universe – by Camyar Chai

== 2001–2002 ==
- The Edible Woman – by Dave Carley, based on the novel by Margaret Atwood
- The Music Man – by Meredith Willson and Franklin Lacey
- The School for Wives – by Molière
- The Drawer Boy – by Michael Healey
- The Rainmaker – by N. Richard Nash
- The Dead Reckoning – by Aaron Bushkowsky

== 2000–2001 ==
- The Coronation Voyage – by Michel Marc Bouchard, translated by Linda Gaboriau
- Guys and Dolls – music & lyrics by Frank Loesser, book by Jo Swerling
- Wit – by Margaret Edson
- Candida – by George Bernard Shaw
- The Beauty Queen of Leenane – by Martin McDonagh
- Game Misconduct – by Lesley Uyeda and Tom Cone
- Kilt – by Jonathan Wilson
- Dona Flora – by Electric Company

== 1999–2000 ==
- Of Mice and Men – by John Steinbeck
- The Rise and Fall of Little Voice – by Jim Cartwright
- She Stoops to Conquer – by Oliver Goldsmith
- Patience – by Jason Sherman
- The Bachelor Brothers on Tour – by Bill Dow and Martin Kinch
- 2 Pianos, 4 Hands – by Ted Dykstra and Richard Greenblatt
- The Overcoat – by Morris Panych and Wendy Gorling

== 1998–1999 ==
- An Ideal Husband – by Oscar Wilde
- The Attic, The Pearls and 3 Fine Girls – by Ann-Marie MacDonald, Alisa Palmer, Martha Ross
- Billy Bishop Goes to War – by John Gray and Eric Peterson
- Skylight – by David Hare
- Tartuffe – by Molière
- The History of Things to Come – by Morris Panych, Gary Jones and Shawn Macdonald
- Suburban Motel – by George F. Walker

== 1997–1998 ==
- 2 Pianos, 4 Hands – by Ted Dykstra and Richard Greenblatt
- The Overcoat – by Morris Panych and Wendy Gorling
- A Perfect Ganesh – by Terrence McNally
- Atlantis – by Maureen Hunter
- Mrs. Warren's Profession – by George Bernard Shaw
- Picasso at the Lapin Agile – by Steve Martin

== 1996–1997 ==
- Ghosts – by Henrik Ibsen
- Tons of Money – by Alan Ayckbourn
- 2000 – by Joan MacLeod
- Who's Afraid of Virginia Woolf? – by Edward Albee
- The Heiress – by Ruth Goetz and Augustus Goetz
- Money and Friends – by David Williamson

== 1995–1996 ==
- Three Tall Women – by Edward Albee
- The Importance of Being Earnest – by Oscar Wilde
- The Crucible – by Arthur Miller
- Later Life – by A. R. Gurney
- Betrayal – by Harold Pinter
- Dr. Jekyll & Mr. Hyde, A Love Story – adapted by James Nichol
- True Mummy – by Tom Cone

== 1994–1995 ==
- Oleanna – by David Mamet
- Charley's Aunt – by Brandon Thomas
- Fronteras Americanas – by Guillermo Verdecchia
- The Cherry Orchard – by Anton Chekhov
- Waiting for the Parade – by John Murrell
- Homeward Bound – by Elliott Hayes

== 1993–1994 ==
- Born Yesterday – by Garson Kanin
- A Little of Wot You Fancy – by Susan Cox
- If We Are Women – by Joanna McClelland Glass
- The Relapse – by Sir John Vanbrugh
- A Doll's House – by Henrik Ibsen
- Struggle of the Dogs & the Black – by Bernard-Marie Koltès

== 1992–1993 ==
- The Millionairess – by George Bernard Shaw
- The Wingfield Trilogy – by Dan Needles
- Shirley Valentine – by Willy Russell
- Lips Together, Teeth Apart – by Terrence McNally
- Much Ado About Nothing – by William Shakespeare
- Death and the Maiden – by Ariel Dorfman
- Private Lives – by Noël Coward

== 1991–1992 ==
- A Moon for the Misbegotten – by Eugene O'Neill
- The Miser Molière – adapted by Tom Cone
- Love and Anger – by George F. Walker
- Macbeth – by William Shakespeare
- Fallen Angels – by Noël Coward
- My Children! My Africa! – by Athol Fugard

== 1990–1991 ==
- A Streetcar Named Desire – by Tennessee Williams
- The Heidi Chronicles – by Wendy Wasserstein
- Hosanna – by Michel Tremblay
- Pygmalion – by George Bernard Shaw
- Other People's Money – by Jerry Sterner
- Herringbone, The Musical – by Tom Cone, Skip Kennon and Ellen Fitzhugh

== 1989–1990 ==
- Hedda Gabler – by Henrik Ibsen
- Blithe Spirit – by Noël Coward
- We Won't Pay! We Won't Pay! – by Dario Fo
- Shirley Valentine – by Willy Russell
- Doc – by Sharon Pollock
- Rock and Roll – by John Gray

== 1988–1989 ==
- A Lie of the Mind – by Sam Shepard
- Nothing Sacred – by George F. Walker
- The Glass Menagerie – by Tennessee Williams
- Health, The Musical – by John Gray
- Frankie and Johnny in the Clair de Lune – by Terrence McNally
- Les Liaisons Dangereuses – by Christopher Hampton

== 1987–1988 ==
- A Midsummer Night's Dream – by William Shakespeare
- Fire – by Paul LeDoux and David Young
- B-Movie, The Play – by Tom Wood
- Back to Beulah – by W. O. Mitchell
- We, the Undersigned – by Aleksandr Gelman
- The Dining Room – by A.R. Gurney Jr.

== 1986–1987 ==
- Noises Off – by Michael Frayn
- Paracelsus – by George Ryga
- Diary of Anne Frank – by Frances Goodrich and Albert Hackett
- Private Lives – by Noël Coward
- Master Class – by David Pownall
- Foxfire – by Susan Cooper and Hume Cronyn
- I'm Not Rappaport – by Herb Gardner

A Chorus Line.

== 1984–1985 ==
- A Man for All Seasons – by Robert Bolt
- Terra Nova – by Ted Tally
- Better Watch Out, You Better Not Die – by John Gray
- Clarence Darrow – by David W. Rintels
- The School for Scandal – by Richard Brinsley Sheridan
- Cloud 9 – by Caryl Churchill
- I'll Be Back Before Midnight – by Peter Colley

== 1983–1984 ==
- Death of a Salesman – by Arthur Miller
- The Murder of Auguste Dupin – by J. Ben Tarver
- Godspell – by Michael Tebelak
- K-2 – by Patrick Meyers
- The Tomorrow Box – by Anne Chislett
- Amadeus – by Peter Shaffer
- Terrace Tanzi: The Venus Flytrap – by Claire Luckham
- North Shore Live – by Tom Wood, Nicola Cavendish and Bob Baker
- The Guys – Jean Barbeau, translated by Linda Gaboriau
- Win, Lose, Draw – by Mary Gallagher and Ava Watson

== 1982–1983 ==
- The Black Bonspiel of Wullie MacCrimmon – by W. O. Mitchell
- The Dresser – by Ronald Harwood
- A Gift to Last – by Gordon Pinsent, adapted by Alden Nowlan and Walter Learning
- Mass Appeal – by Bill C. Davis
- The Tempest – by William Shakespeare
- A Funny Thing Happened on the Way to the Forum – by Stephen Sondheim, Larry Gelbart and Burt Shevelove
- Dry Rot – by John Chapman
- White Boys – by Tom Walmsey
- Clarence Darrow – by David W. Rintels
- As Loved Our Fathers – by Tom Kahill
- Dylan Thomas Bach – by Leon Pownall

== 1981–1982 ==
- The Notebook of Trigorin – by Tennessee Williams
- The Curse of the Werewolf – by Ken Hill and Ian Armit
- Wings – by Arthur Kopit
- Hunchback of Notre Dame – by Dennis Foon
- Romeo and Juliet – by William Shakespeare
- See How They Run – by Philip King
- Billy Bishop Goes to War – by John MacLachlan Gray and Eric Peterson

== 1980–1981 ==
- The Servant of Two Masters – by Carlo Goldoni
- The Red Devil Battery Sign – by Tennessee Williams
- The Man Who Came to Dinner – by Moss Hart and George S. Kaufman
- The Lady from the Sea – by Henrik Ibsen
- Macbeth – by William Shakespeare
- Dreaming and Duelling – by John Lazarus
- The Tempest – by William Shakespeare
- Much Ado About Nothing – by William Shakespeare

== 1979–1980 ==
- Jitters – by David French
- Blithe Spirit – by Noël Coward
- The Innocents – by William Archibald
- Love for Love – by William Congreve
- A Streetcar Named Desire – by Tennessee Williams
- Henry VI, Part 1 – by William Shakespeare
- As You Like It – by William Shakespeare
- Gunga Heath – by Heath Lamberts

== 1978–1979 ==
- Hamlet – by William Shakespeare
- A Flea in Her Ear – by Georges Feydeau
- The Crucible – by Arthur Miller
- Tales from the Vienna Woods – by Ödön von Horváth
- Ghosts – by Henrik Ibsen
- The Elocution of Benjamin Franklin – by Steve J. Spears
- Midtown Aces – by Jesse Boydan
- The Promise – by Aleksei Arbuzov
- Endgame – by Samuel Beckett

== 1977–1978 ==
- Pygmalion – by George Bernard Shaw
- Arsenic and Old Lace – by Joseph Kesselring
- Oedipus (Swollen Foot) – by Seneca, adapted by Ted Hughes
- The Contractor – by David Storey
- Twelfth Night – by William Shakespeare
- Ashes – by David Rudkin
- A Respectable Wedding – by Bertolt Brecht
- Jack Sprat – by Joe Wiesenfeld
- Loot – by Joe Orton

== 1976–1977 ==
- Tartuffe – by Molière
- Count of Monte Cristo – by Ken Hill
- King Lear – by William Shakespeare
- Travesties – by Tom Stoppard
- Camino Real – by Tennessee Williams
- Dirty Linen and New-Found-Land – by Tom Stoppard
- The Blues – by Hrant Alianak
- The Sound of Distant Thunder – by Christopher Newton
- 7 Under the 0 – by Allan Stratton

== 1975–1976 ==
- Equus – by Peter Shaffer
- The Speckled Band – by Arthur Conan Doyle
- Macbeth – by William Shakespeare
- Leonce and Lena – by George Büchner
- Camille – by Robert David MacDonald
- Kennedy's Children – by Robert Patrick
- Komagata Maru incident – by Sharon Pollock
- Back to Beulah – by W. O. Mitchell
- Dear Janet, Dear Mr. Kooning – by Stanley Eveling
- Why Hanna's Skirt Won't Stay Down – by Tom Eyen

== 1974–1975 ==
- The Taming of the Shrew – by William Shakespeare
- Harvey – by Mary Coyle Chase
- The Adventures of Pinocchio – adapted by John Wood
- Of the Fields, Lately – by David French
- The Caucasian Chalk Circle – by Bertolt Brecht
- And Out Goes You? – by Sharon Pollock
- Frankenstein – adapted by Alden Knowlan and Walter Learning

== 1973–1974 ==
- Julius Caesar – by William Shakespeare
- Leaving Home – by David French
- Mr. Scrooge – music by Doroles Claman, book by Richard Morris and Ted Wood
- Mandragola – by Niccolò Machiavelli
- A Doll's House – by Henrik Ibsen
- Dutch Uncle – by Simon Gray
- Queer Sights, A Mouldy Tale – by Frank McEnaney

Travesties - by Tom Stoppard

== 1972–1973 ==
- Forty Years On – by Alan Bennett
- How the Other Half Loves – by Alan Ayckbourn
- Treasure Island – by Robert Louis Stevenson
- Lulu Street – by Ann Henry
- Old Times – by Harold Pinter
- Pillar of Sand – by Eric Nicol
- Arms and the Man – by George Bernard Shaw

== 1971–1972 ==
- The Chemmy Circle – by Georges Feydeau
- The Sorrows of Frederick – by Romulus Linney
- Treasure Island – adapted by Bernard Miles
- Crabdance – by Beverley Simons
- Relatively Speaking – by Alan Ayckbourn
- The Native – by Merv Campone
- Hadrian VII – by Peter Luke

== 1970–1971 ==
- The Secretary Bird – by William Douglas-Home
- Rosencrantz and Guildenstern Are Dead – by Tom Stoppard
- Othello – by William Shakespeare
- A Day in the Death of Joe Egg – by Peter Nichols
- Plaza Suite – by Neil Simon
- Hobson's Choice – by Harold Brighouse

== 1969–1970 ==
- The Royal Hunt of the Sun – by Peter Shaffer
- The Show-Off – by George Kelly
- Colours in the Dark – by James Reaney
- Events While Guarding the Bofors Gun – by John McGrath
- Village Wooing – and Dear Liar by George Bernard Shaw and Jerome Kitty
- Tango – by Sławomir Mrożek
- Staircase – by Charles Dyer
- Che Guevara – by Mario Fratti
- Foreplay – by Barry Friesen
- The Candidate – by James Schevill
- Space-Fan – by James Schevill
- The Criminals – by Jose Triana

== 1968–1969 ==
- The Fourth Monkey – by Eric Nicol
- Summer of the 17th Doll – by Ray Lawler
- A Thurber Carnival – by James Thurber
- Moby Dick-Rehearsed – adapted by Orson Welles
- Mrs. Mouse Are You Within? – by Frank Marcus
- The Filthy Piranesi – by William D. Roberts
- Black Comedy – by Peter Shaffer
- Grass & Wild Strawberries – by George Ryga
- Fortune and Men's Eyes – by John Herbert
- Tiny Alice – by Edward Albee
- The Partition – by Jacques Languirand
- Land Before Time – by M. Charles Cohen
- The Visitor – by Betty Lambert

== 1967–1968 ==
- Androcles and the Lion – by George Bernard Shaw
- The Ecstasy of Rita Joe – by George Ryga
- The Beaux' Stratagem – by George Farquhar
- Philadelphia, Here I Come – by Brian Friel
- A Streetcar Named Desire – by Tennessee Williams
- The Firebugs – by Max Frisch
- Walking Happy – by Harold Brighouse
- Listen to the Wind – by James Reaney
- Three Rituals – by Ryūnosuke Akutagawa, Brian Shein and Sheldon Feldner
- Requiem for a Dinosaur – by James Cruikshank

== 1966–1967 ==
- Candida – by George Bernard Shaw
- Count Down to Armageddon – by James Clavell
- Peer Gynt – by Henrik Ibsen
- She Stoops to Conquer – by Oliver Goldsmith
- How to Run the Country – by Paul St. Pierre
- Anything Goes – by Cole Porter

== 1965–1966 ==
- Oh, What a Lovely War! – by Joan Littlewood
- A Month in the Country – by Ivan Turgenev
- The Knack – by Ann Jellicoe
- Major Barbara – by George Bernard Shaw
- The Typists & The Tiger – by Murray Schisgal
- Romeo and Juliet – by William Shakespeare
- Like Father, Like Fun – by Eric Nicol
- Lock Up Your Daughters – adapted from Henry Fielding by Bernard Miles

== 1964–1965 ==
- Ring Round the Moon – by Jean Anouilh
- Desire Under the Elms – by Eugene O'Neill
- The Taming of the Shrew – by William Shakespeare
- Christmas in the Market Place – by Henry Gheon
- The Seagull – by Anton Chekhov
- Oh Dad, Poor Dad, Mamma's Hung You in the Closet and I'm Feelin' So Sad – by Arthur Kopit
- Stop the World – I Want to Get Off – by Leslie Bricusse and Anthony Newley

== 1963–1964 ==
- The Hostage – by Brendan Behan
- Private Lives – by Noël Coward
- The Boy Friend – by Sandy Wilson
- Julius Caesar – by William Shakespeare
- The Caretaker – by Harold Pinter
- Charley's Aunt – by Brandon Thomas
