= The Hunchback of Notre-Dame =

1831 novel by Victor Hugo

- 1st edition cover
- Author: Victor Hugo
- Original title: Notre-Dame de Paris
- Translator: Frederic Shoberl (English)
- Language: French
- Genre: Gothic, Romanticism
- Set in: Paris, 1482
- Publisher: Gosselin
- Publication date: 16 March 1831
- Publication place: France
- English publication date: 1833
- Media type: Hardback
- Pages: 940, in 3 volumes
- Dewey Decimal: 843.7

The Hunchback of Notre-Dame (French: Notre-Dame de Paris, lit. 'Our Lady of Paris', originally titled Notre-Dame de Paris. 1482) is a French Gothic novel by Victor Hugo, published in 1831. The title refers to the Notre-Dame Cathedral, which features prominently throughout the novel. It focuses on the unfortunate story of Quasimodo, the Romani street dancer Esmeralda, and Quasimodo's guardian the Archdeacon Claude Frollo in 15th-century Paris. All its elements—the Renaissance setting, impossible love affairs and marginalised characters—make the work a model of the literary themes of Romanticism.

The novel is considered a classic of French literature and has been adapted repeatedly for film, stage and television. Some prominent examples include a 1923 silent film with Lon Chaney, a 1939 sound film with Charles Laughton, a 1956 film with Anthony Quinn, and a 1996 animated film with Tom Hulce.

Written during a time of cultural upheaval, the novel champions historical preservation. Hugo solidified Notre-Dame de Paris as a national icon, arguing for the preservation of Gothic architecture as an element of France's cultural heritage.

== Title ==
The novel's French title, Notre-Dame de Paris, refers to Notre-Dame Cathedral. Frederic Shoberl's 1833 English translation was published as The Hunchback of Notre-Dame. This became the generally used title in English, referring to Quasimodo, Notre-Dame's bell-ringer. Victor Hugo was allegedly upset that this translation placed focus on only one character, seeing his novel as a broader plea for the preservation of France's gothic architecture.

== Background ==
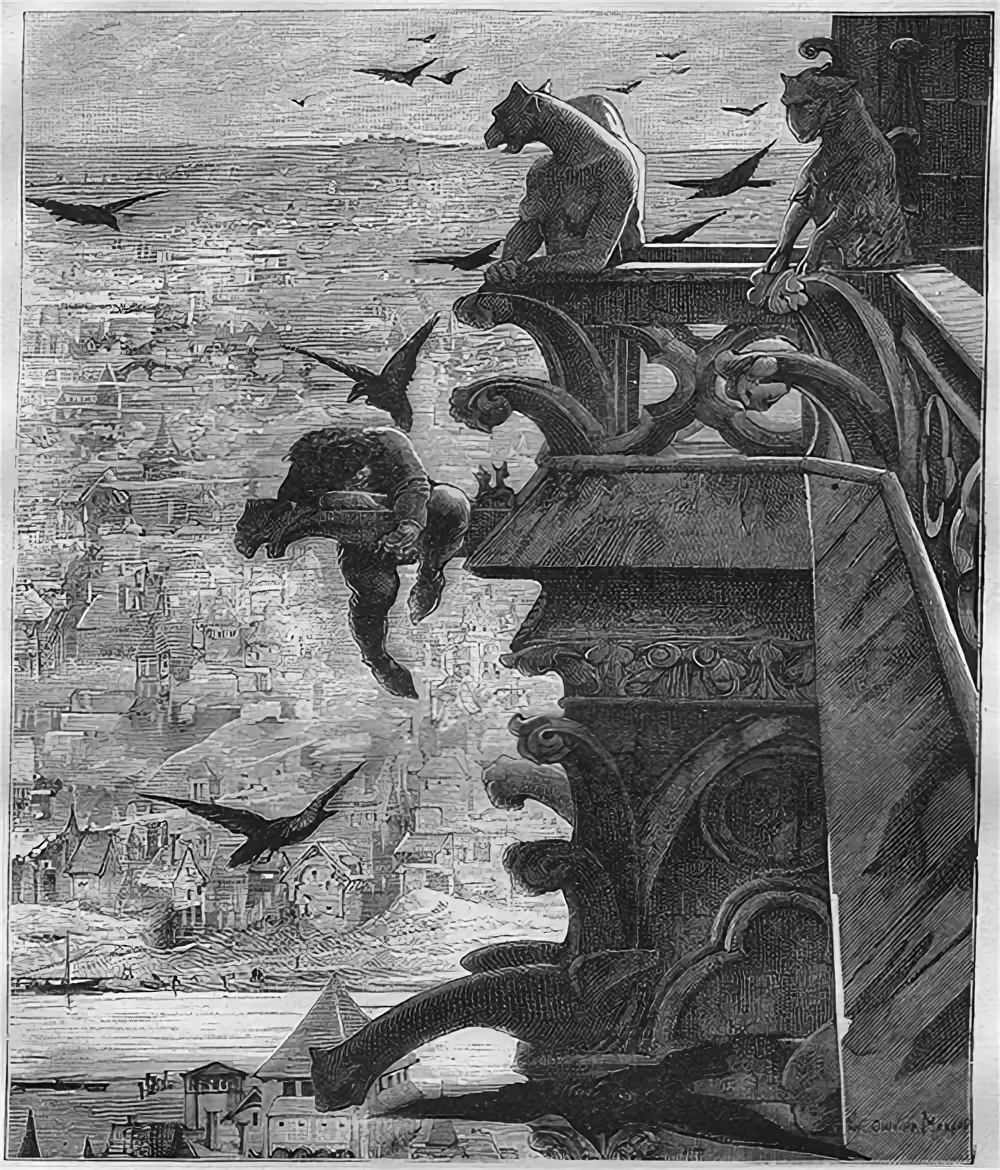
Illustration from Victor Hugo et son temps (1881)

Victor Hugo initially agreed to write Notre-Dame de Paris in 1828. Due to Hugo's other literary projects, the novel fell by the wayside until 1830. A primary theme of the novel is the value of Gothic architecture, which was neglected and often destroyed to be replaced by new buildings or defaced by replacement of parts of buildings in a newer style. For instance, the medieval stained glass panels of Notre-Dame de Paris had been replaced by white glass to let more light into the church. A few years earlier, Hugo had already published a paper entitled Guerre aux Démolisseurs (War [declared] on the Demolishers) specifically aimed at saving Paris's medieval architecture. The agreement with his original publisher, Gosselin, was that the book would be finished that same year, but Hugo was constantly delayed due to the demands of other projects. In the summer of 1830, Gosselin demanded that Hugo complete the book by February 1831. Beginning in September 1830, Hugo worked nonstop on the project thereafter.

Legend has it that Hugo locked himself in his room without clothes to write the novel on time, the idea being he could not go outside without clothes.

== Plot ==
In 1482 Paris, during the reign of Louis XI, sixteen-year-old Roma dancer Esmeralda is the romantic and sexual interest of many men, including Captain Phoebus de Chateaupers; poet Pierre Gringoire; the deformed cathedral bell-ringer Quasimodo, and his guardian Archdeacon Claude Frollo. Frollo is torn between his obsessive lust for Esmeralda and the rules of Notre-Dame Cathedral. He orders Quasimodo to kidnap her, but Quasimodo is captured by Phoebus and his guards. Gringoire unwittingly wanders into the "Court of Miracles", populated by the Roma and the truands (beggars). They are about to hang him for being an outsider, but Esmeralda saves him by agreeing to marry him. She only does it to save his life, however, and much to Gringoire's annoyance, refuses to allow him to touch her.

The following day, Quasimodo is sentenced to be flogged and turned on the pillory for two hours, followed by another hour's public exposure. He calls for water. Seeing his thirst, Esmeralda approaches the public stocks and offers him a drink of water. It saves him, and she captures his heart.

Frollo learns from Gringoire, with whom he has a passing acquaintance, that Esmeralda is infatuated with Phoebus. He learns that Phoebus has arranged an assignation with Esmeralda at a local boarding-house, and follows Phoebus there. He observes the meeting from an adjoining room and, inflamed with jealousy, stabs Phoebus. Esmeralda is found near Phoebus' body and is arrested, charged with murder, and sentenced to death by hanging. While imprisoned, Esmeralda is visited by Frollo. The Archdeacon professes his love for her and promises to help her escape if she reciprocates, but she angrily rebuffs him. As Esmeralda is being led to the gallows, Quasimodo swings down from Notre-Dame and carries her off to the cathedral, temporarily protecting her – under the law of sanctuary – from arrest.

Frollo delves deeper into his obsession and becomes frustrated with his plan failing. He breaks into Esmeralda's cell and attempts to rape her. Quasimodo intervenes and beats him, almost throwing him off the cathedral before the moonlight reveals his identity. Frollo kicks Quasimodo and declares to Esmeralda that if he cannot have her, no one shall.

Frollo later informs Gringoire that the Court of Parlement has voted to remove Esmeralda's right to sanctuary so she can be executed. Clopin Trouillefou, the leader of the Roma, hears the news from Gringoire and rallies the Court of Miracles to charge Notre-Dame and rescue Esmeralda.

Quasimodo incorrectly assumes the approaching Roma intend to harm Esmeralda and drives them off. The uproar reaches the king, who is incorrectly informed that those attacking the cathedral are eager for Esmeralda's hanging. The king orders the authorities to dispatch the invaders and calls for Esmeralda's immediate execution to settle the unrest. In the chaos, Esmeralda is taken from the cathedral by Frollo and Gringoire.

Frollo once again attempts to win Esmeralda's love, but she asserts that she would rather die than be with him. Frollo goes to alert the authorities while trapping Esmeralda with Sister Gudule, a reclusive anchoress who bears an extreme hatred for the Roma. However, it is revealed that Esmeralda is Gudule's long-lost daughter Agnès, abducted and raised by the Roma. The two women's joyous reunion is cut short when the king's men arrive to take Esmeralda to the gallows. A desperate Gudule clings to Esmeralda even as she is taken to the place of execution. The guards pull the old woman off her daughter, and she falls to the pavement and dies from the harsh impact.

From the tower of Notre-Dame, Frollo and Quasimodo witness as Esmeralda is hanged. Upon observing this, Quasimodo pushes the Archdeacon from the height of the cathedral to his death. With nothing left to live for, Quasimodo vanishes and is never seen again.

A deformed skeleton is found a few years later embracing another in the charnel house at Montfaucon, implying that Quasimodo had sought Esmeralda among the decaying corpses and had lain down to die while holding her. As the guards attempt to pull the skeletons apart, his skeleton crumbles to dust.

== Characters ==
=== Major ===
- Quasimodo is a "hunchback" with physical deformities, the novel's titular character in English, and the bell-ringer of Notre-Dame. He is twenty years old for the duration of the novel. He is half-blind and almost completely deaf, the latter from all the years ringing the bells of the church. Abandoned by his mother as a baby, he was adopted by Claude Frollo. Quasimodo's life within the confines of the cathedral and his only two outlets – ringing the bells and his love and devotion for Frollo – are described. He rarely ventures outside the Cathedral because the citizens of Paris despise and shun him for his appearance. The notable occasions when he does leave include taking part in the Festival of Fools (which is celebrated on 6 January) – , during which he is elected the Pope of Fools due to his perfect hideousness – ; his subsequent attempt to kidnap Esmeralda; his rescue of Esmeralda from the gallows; his attempt to bring Phoebus to Esmeralda; and his final abandonment of the cathedral at the end of the novel. It is revealed in the story that the baby Quasimodo was left by the Roma in place of Esmeralda, whom they abducted.
- Esmeralda (born Agnès) is a beautiful 16-year-old street dancer (referred to in the text by "Gypsy") who is naturally compassionate and kind. She is the center of the human drama within the story. A popular focus of the citizens' attention, she is the recipient of their changing attitudes, being first adored as an entertainer, then hated as a witch, before being lauded again by Quasimodo. She is loved by Quasimodo, Pierre Gringoire, and Claude Frollo but falls hopelessly in love with Captain Phoebus. Phoebus is a handsome soldier who she believes will protect her but in reality, simply wants to seduce her. She is one of the few characters to show Quasimodo a measure of human kindness. She is eventually revealed to be not Roma by birth; instead, she was kidnapped by the Roma to "replace" the deformed Quasimodo.
- Claude Frollo, the novel's main antagonist, is the Archdeacon of Notre-Dame. His sour attitude and alchemical experiments have alienated him from Parisians, who believe him to be a sorcerer. His only surviving relative is his dissolute younger brother Jehan, whom he unsuccessfully attempts to reform. Frollo also helps care for Quasimodo. Frollo's numerous sins include lechery, failed alchemy, sexual assault and other listed vices. His mad attraction to Esmeralda sets off a chain of events leading to Esmeralda's execution.
- Pierre Gringoire is a struggling poet. He mistakenly finds his way into the "Court of Miracles", the domain of the Truands (beggars). In order to preserve the secret location of the Court, Gringoire must either be killed by hanging or marry a Roma. Although Esmeralda does not love him, and in fact believes him to be a coward, she takes pity on his plight and marries him. Touched by her beauty and kindness, Gringoire falls in love with her. But, because she is already in love with Phoebus, much to his disappointment, she will not let him touch her. As time goes on, he grows more fond of Esmeralda's goat Djali than Esmeralda herself, so much so that he chooses to save Djali rather than Esmeralda.
- Captain Phoebus de Chateaupers is the Captain of the King's Archers, and the secondary antagonist in the novel. Of noble birth and very handsome, he is also vain, untrustworthy, and a womanizer. After he saves Esmeralda from abduction, she becomes infatuated with him, and he is intrigued by her. Already betrothed to the beautiful but spiteful Fleur-de-Lys, he wants to seduce Esmeralda nonetheless but is prevented when Frollo stabs him. Phoebus survives, but Esmeralda is taken to be the attempted assassin by all, including Phoebus himself, who no longer wants her. He is condemned to an unhappy married life with Fleur-de-Lys.

=== Minor ===
- Clopin Trouillefou is the King of Truands. He sentences Gringoire to be hanged and presides over his "wedding" to Esmeralda. He rallies the Court of Miracles to rescue Esmeralda from Notre-Dame after the idea is suggested by Gringoire. He is eventually killed during the attack by the King's soldiers.
- Mathias Hungadi Spicali, called Duke of Egypt and Bohemia, is Esmeralda's protector and second-in-command of the Truands. He knows of her past and gave her an amulet to help find her mother. He is last seen during the riot at Notre-Dame to rescue Esmeralda.
- Jehan Frollo du Moulin (literally "of the mill"), translated in Latin as "Joannes Frollo de Molendino", is Claude Frollo's 16-year-old dissolute younger brother. He is a troublemaker and a student at the university. He is dependent on his brother for money, which he then proceeds to squander on alcohol. After Frollo stops giving him money, Jehan becomes a rogue. When he joins Clopin and his beggars to raid the cathedral, he briefly enters the cathedral by ascending one of the towers with a borrowed ladder. Afterwards he sees Quasimodo and tries to shoot an arrow at his eye, but Quasimodo throws him to his death.
- Fleur-de-Lys de Gondelaurier is a beautiful and wealthy noblewoman engaged to Phoebus. Phoebus's attentions to Esmeralda make her insecure and jealous, and she and her friends respond by treating Esmeralda with contempt and spite. Fleur-de-Lys later neglects to inform Phoebus that Esmeralda has not been executed, which serves to deprive the pair of any further contact – though as Phoebus no longer lusts after Esmeralda by this time, this does not matter. The novel ends with their wedding, but they are said to be condemned to an unhappy marriage.
- Madame Aloïse de Gondelaurier is Fleur-de-Lys's mother.
- Sister Gudule, also known as Sachette and formerly named Paquette Guybertaut "la Chantefleurie", is an anchoress living in seclusion in an exposed cell in central Paris. She is tormented by the loss of her daughter Agnès, whom she believes to have been cannibalised by the Roma as a baby, and devotes her life to mourning her. Her long-lost daughter turns out to be Esmeralda, a fact she discovers only moments before Esmeralda is hanged. Gudule is accidentally killed by one of the King's soldiers while attempting to prevent them from taking her daughter.
- Djali is Esmeralda's pet goat. In addition to dancing with Esmeralda, Djali can do tricks for money, such as tell time, spell Phoebus's name, and do impressions of public figures. Later, during Esmeralda's trial, when Esmeralda is falsely accused of stabbing Phoebus, Djali is falsely accused of being the devil in disguise. At the end of the novel, Djali is saved by Gringoire (who has become fond of the goat during his marriage to Esmeralda).
- Louis XI is the King of France. He appears as an old and sick man, but his personality is very sly and Machiavellian, as well as self-centred. He appears briefly when he is brought the news of the rioting at Notre-Dame. He orders his guard to kill the rioters, and also the "witch" Esmeralda, because of being misinformed about the reason of rioting.
- Tristan l'Hermite is a friend of King Louis XI. He leads the band that goes to capture Esmeralda.
- Henriet Cousin is the city executioner, who hangs Esmeralda.
- Florian Barbedienne is the judge who presides over Quasimodo's case for kidnapping Esmeralda. Barbedienne is deaf, and does not realise Quasimodo is also deaf; thus, he assumes Quasimodo is mocking him by not answering his questions. Barbedienne sentences Quasimodo to be tortured in the public square: one hour of flogging for attempted kidnap, and another hour of public disgrace for (what Barbedienne assumed to be) mocking the judge.
- Jacques Charmolue is Claude Frollo's friend in charge of torturing prisoners. He gets Esmeralda to falsely confess to killing Phoebus. He then has her imprisoned.
- Jacques Coppenole is a man who appears at the beginning of the novel as one of the Flemish guests at the Feast of Fools. He convinces the Parisians to walk out on Gringoire's play and select the Fools' Pope.
- Pierrat Torterue makes two brief appearances in the novel. He is the torturer at the Châtelet. He tortures Esmeralda after her interrogation, hurting her so badly that she falsely confesses, sealing her own fate. He is also the official who administers the savage flogging that Quasimodo is sentenced to by Barbedienne.
- An unnamed magistrate presides over Esmeralda's case after she is falsely accused of stabbing Phoebus. He forces her to confess to the crime and sentences her to be hanged on the gallows.
- Robin Poussepain is Jehan Frollo's friend who appears with him during the Feast of Fools and Quasimodo's flogging in the public square.
- Olivier le Mauvais (literally "Olivier the Evil") is King Louis XI's close advisor.
- La Falourdel owns the boarding-house where Phoebus and Esmeralda meet.
- Marc Cenaine is a magician whom Jacques Charmolue and Claude Frollo torture for practising witchcraft while they try to pry alchemy secrets from him.
- Bérangère de Champchevrier is Fleur-de-Lys's friend.
- Jacques Coictier is King Louis XI's physician.
- Robert d'Estouteville is the chamberlain to King Louis XI. He is in a foul mood the day Quasimodo is pilloried, not realising that Quasimodo and the judge on duty are both deaf.
- Colombe is Fleur-de-Lys's friend.
- Lambert Hoctement is a German scholar who, at the beginning of the novel, is tormented by Jehan Frollo and Robin Poussepain.
- Bertrand, the majestic cathedral cat.

== Major themes ==
The novel's original French title, Notre-Dame de Paris, indicates that the cathedral itself is the most significant aspect of the novel, both the main setting and the focus of the story's themes. The building had fallen into disrepair at the time of writing, which was something Hugo felt strongly about. The book portrays the Romantic era as one of extremes in architecture, passion, and religion. The theme of determinism (fate and destiny, as set up in the preface of the novel through the introduction of the word "ANANKE") is explored, as well as revolution and social strife.

=== Architecture ===
Architecture is a major concern of Hugo's in Notre-Dame de Paris, not just as embodied in the cathedral itself, but as representing throughout Paris and the rest of Europe an artistic genre which, Hugo argued, was about to disappear with the arrival of the printing press. Claude Frollo's portentous phrase, "Ceci tuera cela" ("This will kill that", as he looks from a printed book to the cathedral building), sums up this thesis, which is expounded on in Book V, chapter 2. Hugo writes that "quiconque naissant poète se faisait architecte" ("whoever was born a poet became an architect"), arguing that while the written word was heavily censored and difficult to reproduce, architecture was extremely prominent and enjoyed considerable freedom.

Il existe à cette époque, pour la pensée écrite en pierre, un privilège tout-à-fait comparable à notre liberté actuelle de la presse. C'est la liberté de l'architecture.

— Book V, Chapter 2
Translation:

There exists in this era, for thoughts written in stone, a privilege comparable to our current freedom of the press. It is the freedom of architecture.

With the recent introduction of the printing press, it became possible to reproduce one's ideas much more easily on paper, and Hugo considered this period to represent the last flowering of architecture as a great art form. As with many of his books, Hugo was interested in a time that seemed to him to be on the cusp of two types of society.

The major theme of the third book is that over time the cathedral has been repaired but these repairs and additions have made the cathedral worse: "And who put the cold, white panes in the place of those windows" and "...who substituted for the ancient Gothic altar, splendidly encumbered with shrines and reliquaries, that heavy marble sarcophagus, with angels' heads and clouds" are a few examples of this. This chapter also discusses how, after repairs to the cathedral after the French Revolution, there was not a significant style in what was added. It seems as if the new architecture is now uglier and worse than it was before the repair.

== Literary significance and reception ==
Hugo introduced with this work the concept of the novel as Epic Theatre. A giant epic about the history of a whole people, incarnated in the figure of the great cathedral as witness and silent protagonist of that history, and the whole idea of time and life as an ongoing, organic panorama centered on dozens of characters caught in the middle of that history. It is the first novel to have beggars as protagonists.

A significant aspect of Notre-Dame de Paris is that it encompasses the whole of life, from the King of France to Paris sewer rats, in a manner later used by Honoré de Balzac, Gustave Flaubert and many others, including Charles Dickens. The enormous popularity of the book in France spurred the nascent historical preservation movement in that country and strongly encouraged Gothic revival architecture. Ultimately it led to major renovations at Notre-Dame in the 19th century led by Eugène Viollet-le-Duc.

== Allusions and references ==
=== Allusions to actual history, geography and current science ===
In The Hunchback of Notre-Dame, Victor Hugo makes frequent reference to the architecture of the Cathedral of Notre-Dame in Paris. He also mentions the invention of the printing press, when the bookmaker near the beginning of the work speaks of "the German pest".

In 2010, British archivist Adrian Glew discovered references to a real-life man called "Hunchback" who was a foreman of a government sculpting studio in Paris in the 1820s who worked on post-Revolution restorations to the cathedral.

=== Allusions in other works ===
The name Quasimodo has become synonymous with "a courageous heart beneath a grotesque exterior".

== Adaptations ==
To date, all the film and TV adaptations have strayed somewhat from the original plot, some going as far as to give it a happy ending, including in the classic 1939 film and the 1996 Disney animated film. The 1956 French film is one of the few versions to end almost exactly like the novel, although it changes other sections of the story. The Disney version has an ending that is inspired by an opera created by Hugo himself.

=== Films ===
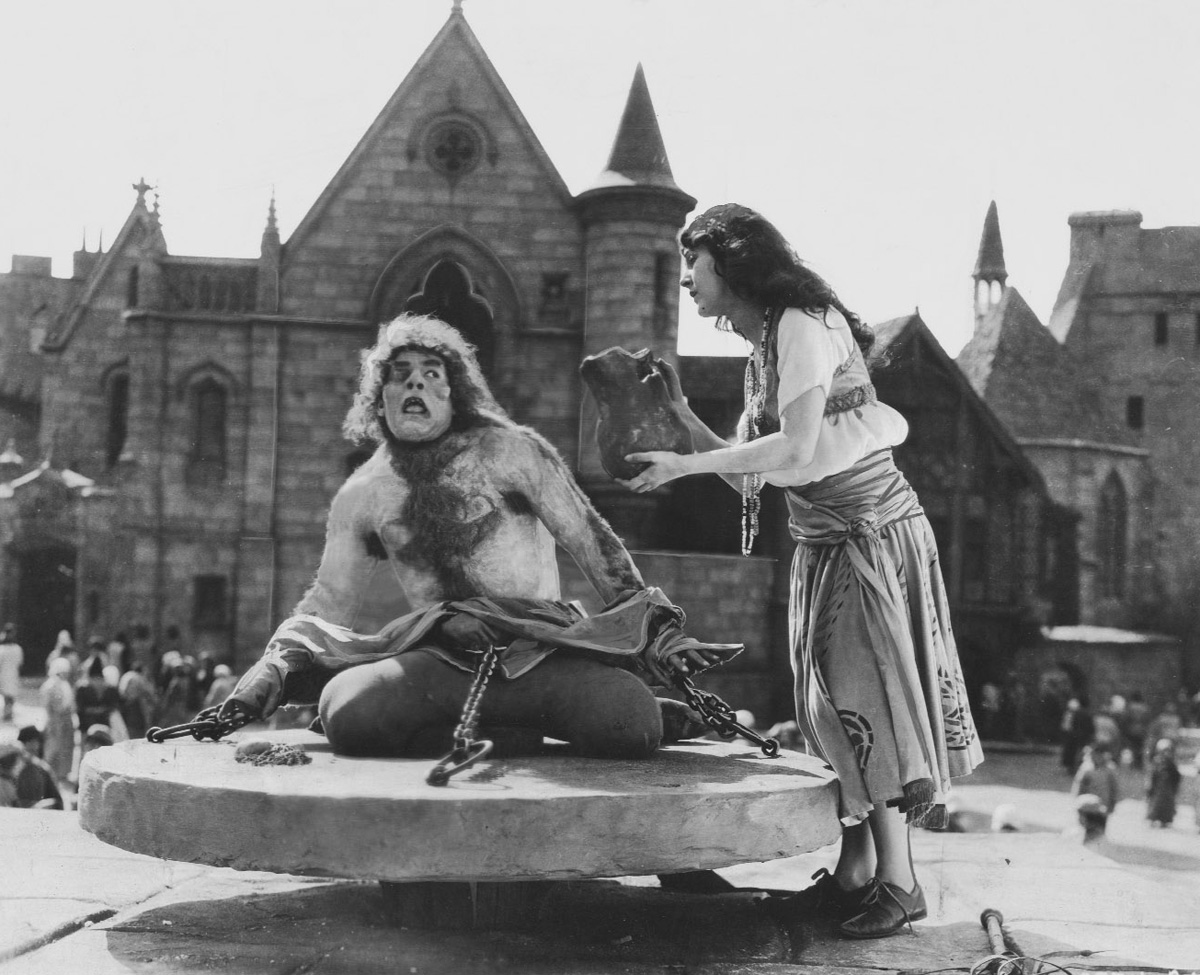
Lon Chaney and Patsy Ruth Miller in the 1923 film adaptation

- Esmeralda, a 1905 French short silent film
- The Hunchback of Notre Dame, a 1911 French silent film
- The Darling of Paris, a 1917 American silent film
- Esmeralda, a 1922 British silent film
- The Hunchback of Notre Dame, a 1923 silent film starring Lon Chaney as Quasimodo, directed by Wallace Worsley, produced by Carl Laemmle and Irving Thalberg and distributed by Universal Pictures
- The Hunchback of Notre Dame, a 1939 sound film starring Charles Laughton as Quasimodo and Maureen O'Hara as Esmeralda, directed by William Dieterle, produced by Pandro S. Berman and distributed by RKO Radio Pictures
- The Hunchback of Notre Dame, a 1956 French film starring Anthony Quinn as Quasimodo and Gina Lollobrigida as Esmeralda, directed by Jean Delannoy, and produced by Raymond Hakim and Robert Hakim
- The Hunchback of Notre Dame, a 1986 Australian-American fantasy animated film by Burbank Films Australia
- The Hunchback of Notre Dame, a 1996 animated film by Walt Disney Feature Animation starring Tom Hulce as the voice of Quasimodo and Demi Moore as the voice of Esmeralda, directed by Kirk Wise and Gary Trousdale and produced by Don Hahn
- The Hunchback of Notre Dame II, a 2002 direct-to-video animated film and sequel to the 1996 film by Walt Disney Television Animation starring Tom Hulce as the voice of Quasimodo and Demi Moore as the voice of Esmeralda, directed by Bradley Raymond
- The Hunchback of Notre Dame, a 1996 Dingo Pictures animated film
- The Hunchback of Notre Dame, a 1996 Golden Films animated film
- The Hunchback of Notre Dame, a 1996 Jetlag Productions animated film
- The Secret of the Hunchback, a 1996 direct-to-video animated film by UAV Entertainment
- Quasimodo d'El Paris, a 1999 parody film
- Quasi, a 2023 satirical comedy film

=== Television ===
- The Hunchback of Notre Dame, a 1966 miniseries
- The Hunchback of Notre Dame, a 1976 television film starring Warren Clarke as Quasimodo, Michelle Newell as Esmeralda, and Kenneth Haigh as Frollo; directed by Alan Cooke
- The Hunchback of Notre Dame, a 1977 miniseries
- The Hunchback of Notre Dame, a 1982 British-American television film starring Anthony Hopkins as Quasimodo, Lesley-Anne Down as Esmeralda and Derek Jacobi as Frollo, directed by Michael Tuchner and Alan Hume, and produced by Norman Rosemont and Malcolm J. Christopher
- The Magical Adventures of Quasimodo, a 1996 animated series
- The Hunchback, a 1997 television film starring Mandy Patinkin as Quasimodo, Salma Hayek as Esmeralda and Richard Harris as Frollo

=== Music ===
- A 1977 lush orchestral disco 28-minute epic re-telling the tale of Quasimodo and Esmeralda, by Alec R. Costandinos and the Syncophonic Orchestra
- The Hunchback of Notre Dame, a 1996 recording of music written by Styx singer Dennis DeYoung for his musical adaptation of the novel
- The Hunchback of Notre Dame soundtrack for the 1996 Disney film
- A 2016 soundtrack to the musical adaptation, based on the novel and songs from the Disney film version

=== Ballet ===
- La Esmeralda (1844), with choreography by Jules Perrot and music by Cesare Pugni. First performed at Her Majesty's Theatre in London. The ballet has a long performance history in Russia via the revivals of the choreographer Marius Petipa in St. Petersburg throughout the late 19th century.
- Gudule's Daughter, or Esmiralda (1902), with choreography by Alexander Alexeyevich Gorsky and music by Antoine Simon
- In 1965, a choreography by Roland Petit, first performed by the Paris Opera Ballet
- In 1998, a choreography and direction by Michael Pink and original music score by Philip Feeney
- Ringaren i Notre Dame (The Bellringer of Notre Dame; 2009), with choreography by Pär Isberg and original music score by Stefan Nilsson, first performed by the Royal Swedish Ballet.

=== Musical theatre ===
- La Esmeralda, opera by Louise Bertin (1836), with libretto by Victor Hugo
- Esmeralda, opera by Alexander Dargomyzhsky (1847) based on the Victor Hugo novel
- Esmeralda (1856), opera in English with a score by Vincenzo Battista
- In 1864, an opera by William Henry Fry with libretto by his brother Joseph Reese Fry based on the Victor Hugo novel. First performance: Academy of Music, Philadelphia, 4 May 1864, conducted by Theodore Thomas
- Esmeralda, opera by Arthur Thomas (1883), also based on the same Victor Hugo novel
- Notre Dame, romantic opera in two acts by Franz Schmidt, text after Victor Hugo by Schmidt and Leopold Wilk, composed in 1902–1904 and first performed in Vienna in 1914
- In 1993, an off-Broadway musical with music by Byron Janis, lyrics by Hal Hackady, and book by Anthony Scully
- In 1993, a dramatic sung-through musical with book and lyrics by Gary Sullivan and music by John Trent Wallace. After a production at the Mermaid Theatre in London, it was published by Samuel French Ltd in 1997 and has received several UK productions as well as productions in New Zealand and Australia. In 2010, it was rewritten as a conventional musical, with the new title Notre Dame.
- El Jorobado de París (1993), an Argentinian sung-through musical with book and lyrics by Pepe Cibrián Campoy and music by Ángel Mahler. Revised versions opened in 1995, 2006 and 2013.
- An operatic melodrama by Zigmars Liepiņš based on the novel
- In 1998, Notre-Dame de Paris with music by Riccardo Cocciante and lyrics by Luc Plamondon, premiered in Paris and became an instant success.
- From 1999 to 2002, the Disney film was adapted into a darker, more Gothic musical production called Der Glöckner von Notre Dame (translated in English as The Bellringer of Notre Dame) in Berlin. A cast recording was also recorded in German. The musical premiered in the United States in 2014.
- A rock musical version was released in Seattle, Washington, in 1998 titled Hunchback with music and script by C. Rainey Lewis.
- A musical version, scored by Dennis DeYoung, opened in Chicago at the Bailiwick Repertory in the summer of 2008.
- A re-adaptation of the piece titled Our Lady of Paris, with music and lyrics by David Levinson and book by Stacey Weingarten, was produced in a reading format in Manhattan. It re-sets the action to 1954 at the beginning of the Algerian War. After the first reading, the piece underwent revisions; a second reading was produced in January 2011 under the musical's new title, Les Enfants de Paris.
- Catalyst Theatre's musical adaptation titled Hunchback was commissioned by the Citadel Theatre and premiered in 2011 in Edmonton and had a subsequent run at the Vancouver Playhouse Theatre in Vancouver in 2012. Its book, music and lyrics are by Jonathan Christenson from the original novel.

=== Radio ===
A 1934 36-part serial adaptation created by George Edwards was broadcast on Australian radio.

John Carradine starred in an hour-long adaptation broadcast on a 1946 episode of Your Playhouse of Favorites.

The book was twice adapted and broadcast on BBC Radio 4's Classic Serial:

- in 5 parts from 6 January to 3 February 1989, with Jack Klaff as Quasimodo
- in 2 parts on 30 November and 7 December 2008, with deaf actor David Bower playing Quasimodo.

=== Theatre ===
- In 1861, a "Grand Burlesque Extravaganza" by Henry J. Byron, Esmeralda or, the Sensation Goat, was presented at the Royal Strand Theatre in London on 28 September 1861. The piece was revived in 1871 at the same venue, with Harry Paulton as Quasimodo and Rose Cullen as Esmeralda. The programme warned that the burlesque was "founded on, but not to be confounded with, the romance, the opera and the ballet".
- In 1977, an adaptation by Ken Hill was commissioned and staged by the National Theatre in London.
- In 1978, an adaptation by Robert Hossein opened in Paris.
- In 1997, an adaptation for the stage by Nicholas DeBaubien opened in Paris.
- In 2010, an adaptation by Pip Utton was staged at the Pleasance as part of the Edinburgh Fringe Festival.
- In 2010, an original adaptation by Myriad Theatre & Film was staged in London and then toured South England.
- In 2012, an adaptation by Belt Up Theatre was staged in Selby Abbey.
- In 2013, an adaptation by James Villafuerte was staged in Tanghalang Pasigueño Villa Teatro.
- In 2016, a modern adaptation by Harold Hodge Jr called The Boy in the Church premiered in New York City. This adaptation was set in Alabama during the Great Depression.
- In 2019, an adaptation by Benjamin Polya was staged by Iris Theatre at St Paul's Church, Covent Garden, London.

=== Comics ===
Artists like Noel Gloesner, Andrew Dickson, Robin Recht, Tim Conrad, Gilbert Bloch, George Evans and Dick Briefer have all created comic strip and book adaptations of The Hunchback of Notre Dame. Paulo Borges, Gustavo Machado and Dan Spiegle have drawn comic strip and book versions based on the 1996 Disney film adaptation.

=== Video games ===
- Hunchback, a 1983 arcade video game developed by Century Electronics, starring Quasimodo and Esmeralda
- Disney's Animated Storybook: The Hunchback of Notre Dame and The Hunchback of Notre Dame: Topsy Turvy Games, 1996 computer and video games developed by Disney Interactive and 7th Level, based on Disney's adaptation
- Timesplitters 2, a 2002 first-person-shooter developed by Free Radical Design, containing a level based on Notre Dame Cathedral in which the Hunchback is portrayed beheading undead zombies using a shotgun
- Kingdom Hearts 3D: Dream Drop Distance, a 2012 action role-playing video game developed by Square Enix, containing a world inspired by Disney's adaptation, called La Cite des Cloches

== English translations ==
The Hunchback of Notre-Dame has been translated into English many times. Translations are often reprinted in various imprints. Some translations have been revised over time.

1. 1833 Frederic Shoberl as The Hunchback of Notre Dame. Later revisions
2. 1833 William Hazlitt as Notre Dame: A Tale of the Ancien Régime. Later revisions
3. 1862 Henry L. Williams as The Hunchback of Notre Dame
4. 1882 A. Langdon Alger as Notre-Dame de Paris
5. 1888 Isabel F. Hapgood as Notre-Dame de Paris
6. 1892 J. Caroll Beckwith as The Hunchback of Notre Dame
7. 1895 M. W. Artois et al., part of the 28-vol. The Novels of Victor Hugo, reprinted in the 20th century under other titles
8. 1941 Anonymous The Hunchback of Notre Dame Modern Library
  1. Revised by Catherine Liu (2002) ISBN 0-679-64257-9
9. 1956 Lowell Bair as The Hunchback of Notre Dame for Bantam Books and included in Bantam Classics
10. 1964 Walter J. Cobb. In multiple editions, Signet Classics ISBN 0-451-52788-7
11. 1978 John Sturrock. In multiple editions, Penguin Classics ISBN 0-14-044353-3
12. 1993 Alban J. Krailsheimer as Notre-Dame de Paris. Oxford World's Classics ISBN 978-0-19-955580-2
13. 2014 P. Matvei
14. 2018 Andrew Primas
