= Lucy Escott =

American opera singer

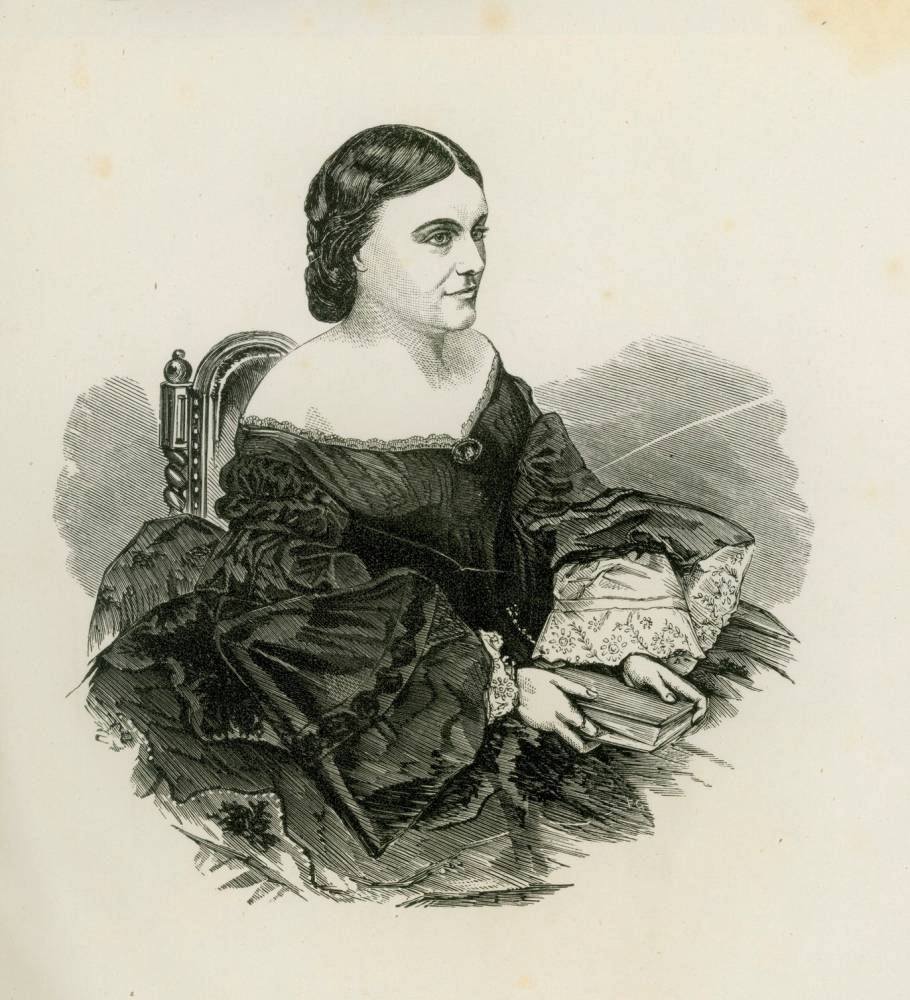
- Lucy Escott in 1863 - The Illustrated Melbourne Post, 17 January 1863

Background information
- Birth name: Lucy Evans Grant
- Born: January 4, 1829; Springfield, Massachusetts, U.S.
- Died: November 26, 1895 (aged 66); Paris, France
- Spouses: Richard Eastcott (m. 1846); Henry Squires (m. 1870)

Lucy Escott (4 January 1829–26 November 1895) was an American soprano and actor-manager who found success in her native country but who had an even greater success in Europe and the United Kingdom. She spent eight years in Australia with the opera company of W. S. Lyster.

== Early life ==
Lucy Escott was born as Lucy Evans Grant in Springfield, Massachusetts in 1829, the daughter of Luther Grant and his wife Lorinda née Williams. She was trained in music from an early age, and was a successful teacher of music in Springfield in her teens. On 24 March 1846, aged 17, she married the British-born musician Richard Eastcott (1817–1880), who was teaching music in Springfield. From 1834, he had studied at the Royal Academy of Music in London and claimed to have played at the coronation of Queen Victoria in 1837. He emigrated to America in 1839, where he taught piano and violin in Worcester, Massachusetts and performed in local concerts. In 1845, 'Miss Grant, pupil of E. Hamilton'appeared in concert with him, and as 'Mrs Eastcott' appeared again with him in concert the month after they were married.

Following her marriage, the couple moved to Providence, Rhode Island, and then to Albany, New York, where Lucy Eastcott sang at St Paul's Church alongside tenor Henry Squires. Eastcott and Squires sang together again in concert at Tripler's Hall in New York City.

== Move to Italy ==
The Eastcotts decided to move to Italy to allow Lucy to further her studies, and the couple were settled in Florence by August 1852. Lucy was hired by the Teatro Nuovo in Naples as a soprano, and became a favorite there following her premiere on 10 January 1853 in Violetta, which Saverio Mercadante wrote expressly for her. While in Italy, her surname also became adjusted to Escott.

== Career in England ==
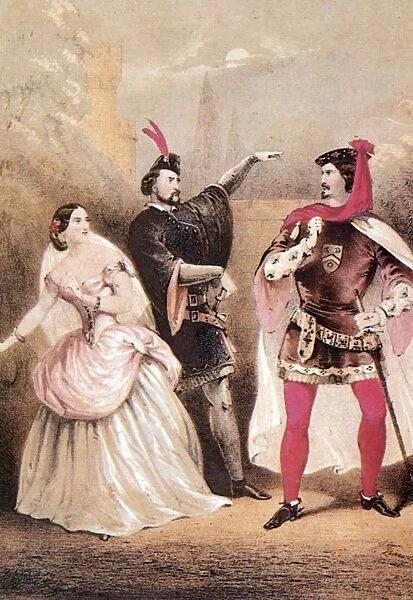
Lucy Escott as Leonora, Augustus Braham as Manrico, and Henri Drayton as the Conte di Luna in the London production of Verdi's Il trovatore, 1856. Contemporary lithograph

After acquiring experience and confidence in the various opera-houses of Italy, her ambition led her to London. Here in June 1854 as 'Madame Lucia Escott' she appeared in a concert at the Hanover Square Rooms. On 2 December 1854, Lucy Eastcott gave birth to a son, Louis Edgar (died 1940), in Antony, Cornwell, the home of Richard Eastcott's family. In 1855 she made her London theatre debut at the Theatre Royal, Drury Lane in La donna del lago. In 1856 she was engaged to play Arline in The Bohemian Girl, Lucia in Lucia di Lammermoor and Leonora in Il trovatore at Drury Lane opposite Augustus Braham as Manrico and Henri Drayton as the Conte di Luna. Other roles at this time included Battista's Esmeralda, Maritana, Aeolia in The Mountain Sylph and Amina in La sonnambula. When J. W. Wallack made a guest appearance Escott played one of the witches in his Macbeth. She sang Galatea in Acis and Galatea, Adina in L'elisir d'amore and sang Lucia in Lucia di Lammermoor once more. These roles stamped her reputation, and after singing in the principal cities of the United Kingdom she visited the United States, and was enthusiastically received by her countrymen as a leading vocalist in the companies of Maurice Strakosch and Max Maretzek.

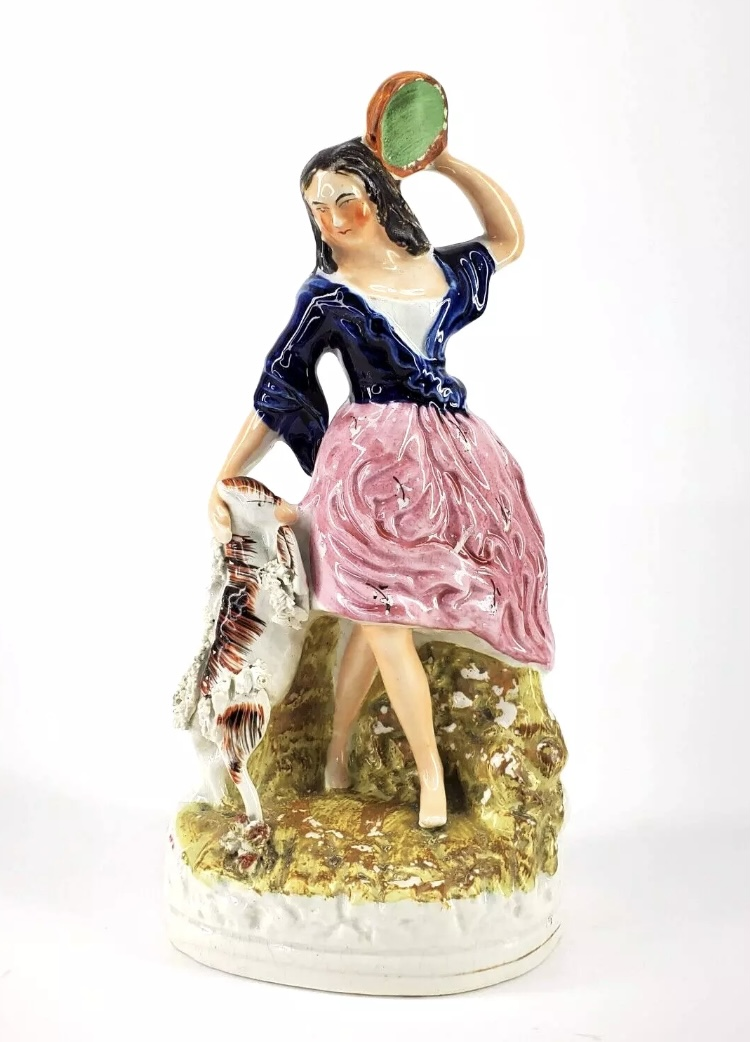
Glazed earthenware figure of Lucy Escott In Esmeralda (c1856)

In 1857 Escott joined the National English Opera Company, for whom she toured the British provinces in Il trovatore, Maritana, Lucia di Lammermoor, Esmeralda, The Bohemian Girl, Cinderella, Norma, Lucrezia Borgia and La traviata. In June 1857 the company played at the Surrey Theatre in London for about three months, including a controversial performance of La traviata in English. By 1858 she was the company's manager, and in September that year she took her now-named Escott English Opera Company to the United States for a three month season at Burton's Theatre in New York. However, William Evans Burton broke the contract after a week, and although he was after successfully sued for $4,000, Escott and her company were forced to tour in concerts and smaller opera houses in America for a year.

== In Australia ==
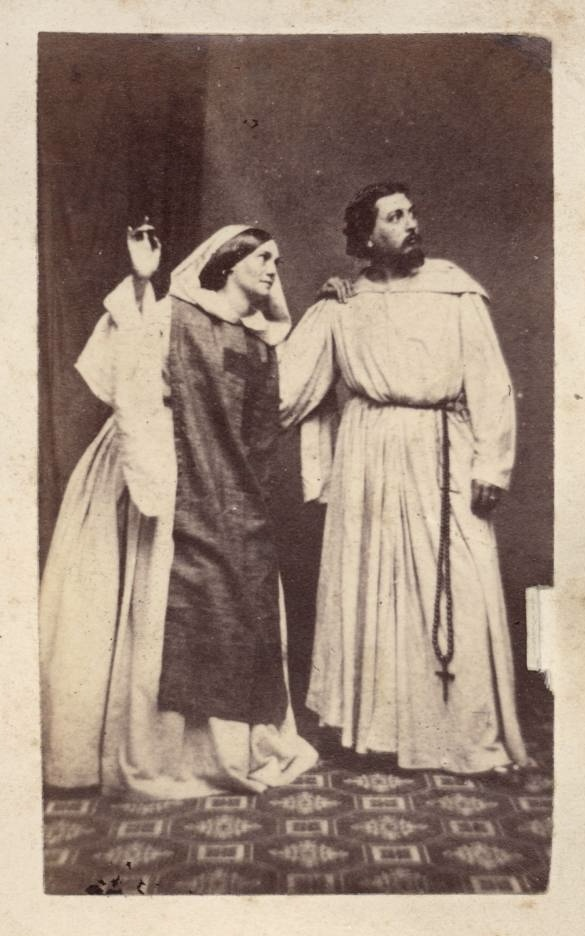
Lucy Escott and Henry Squires in Donizetti's La favorite in Melbourne (1862)

In 1858 W. S. Lyster engaged her for an extended tour. This Lyster Opera Company had some success in the western states of America, and Lyster brought his company to Australia towards the end of 1860, where it remained for about eight years, giving performances of the operas of Italian, German, French and English composers, including Don Giovanni in 1861, and La favorite and Les Huguenots in 1862. Eastcott became an immense favourite in Melbourne. Light or heavy, Italian or English, operas were all the same to her, and one of her most memorable triumphs was on the night of her benefit, when she took the part of Azucena in Il trovatore and electrified the house by her splendid singing and acting, to say nothing of the compass of her voice.

Lyster took his Lyster Opera Company to San Francisco in the Alexander Duthie in August 1868; the tour was a failure from the start and Escott and Squires left Lyster's company while in America.

== Later years ==
Lucy Escott and Henry Squires married in 1870 after having retired from the stage. As her husband Richard Eastcott was still alive in America a divorce must have been finalised. They eventually took up residence in Paris, where Lucy Escott devoted herself to the study of painting and sculpture with as much energy as she had previously infused into her operatic work; and the married life of the two vocalists was an ideally perfect one. Lucy Eastcott died of pneumonia supervening on an attack of quinsy on 26 November 1895, and was cremated according to her wishes and was buried in Père Lachaise Cemetery. On her death, Squires returned to his native Bennington, Vermont, where he died in 1907.

== Notable performances ==
Date	Production	Role	Location	Notes
10 January 1853	Mercadante’s Violetta		Teatro Nuovo, Naples, Italy	
8 May 1853	Lillo's Ser Babbeo	Emilia	Teatro Nuovo, Naples, Italy	
January 1854	Giovanni Moretti’s Il Festino		Teatro Nuovo, Naples, Italy	
24 March 1856	Il trovatore	Leonora	Theatre Royal, Drury Lane, London	
30 June 1856	Esmeralda		Theatre Royal, Drury Lane, London	
