= HMCS Lauzon =

HMCS Lauzon was the name of multiple ships of the Royal Canadian Navy:

- HMCS Lauzon (K371), a River-class frigate, later converted to a Prestonian-class frigate with the pennant number FFE 321
- HMCS Lauzon (K414), a River-class frigate renamed Glace Bay

== Battle honours ==
- Atlantic, 1944–45
