= Esmeraldas =

Esmeraldas is the word for 'emeralds' in Portuguese and Spanish. It may refer to:

== Brazil ==
- Esmeraldas, Minas Gerais

== Ecuador ==
- Esmeraldas, Ecuador, a port city
- Esmeraldas Canton
- Esmeraldas Province
- Esmeraldas River

== See also ==
- Esmeralda (disambiguation)
