= Notre-Dame de Paris (operatic melodrama) =

1997 opera by Zigmars Liepiņš

Notre-Dame de Paris (Latvian: Parīzes Dievmātes katedrāle) is a Latvian operatic melodrama by Zigmars Liepiņš. The libretto by Kaspars Dimiters is based on motifs from Victor Hugo's 1831 novel The Hunchback of Notre-Dame.

The opera was first performed on 7 April 1997. Liepiņš was awarded the Latvian Great Music award for the work in 1997.
