= Heart of the Sun =

- Directed by: Francis Damberger
- Written by: Kim Hogan
- Based on: Jennie's Story by Betty Lambert
- Produced by: John Danylkiw; Kim Hogan
- Starring: Christianne Hirt; Shaun Johnston; Michael Riley
- Cinematography: Peter Wunstorf
- Edited by: Lenka Svab
- Music by: Simon Kendall
- Production company: Dancing Stones Film Production
- Release date: August 30, 1998 (MWFF)
- Running time: 94 minutes
- Country: Canada
- Language: English

Heart of the Sun is a Canadian drama film, directed by Francis Damberger and released in 1998. Based on the play Jennie's Story by Betty Lambert, the film explores the controversial Sexual Sterilization Act of Alberta through the story of Jennie (Christianne Hirt), a woman trying to have a baby with her husband Harry (Shaun Johnston) who learns that she was forcibly sterilized as a teenager.

The film premiered at the Montreal World Film Festival in 1998.

Hirt won the award for Best Actress at the Alberta Film and Television Awards in 1999, and screenwriter Kim Hogan was nominated for the Genie Award for Best Adapted Screenplay at the 20th Genie Awards.
