= Carlos De Antonis =

Argentine opera singer (born c.1965)

- Carlos De Antonis
- Born: Carlos De Antonio c. 1965 (age 60–61); Tandil, Buenos Aires, Argentina
- Occupation: Opera singer
- Known for: America's Got Talent
- Website: Official website

Carlos De Antonis (born c. 1965 in Tandil, Argentina) is an Argentine opera singer and theatre actor. A tenor, he appeared as Quasimodo in El Jorobado de París in 1993 and 1995 and as the Mad Sailor in Cibrián-Mahler's Drácula in 1993, 1994, and again in 2022. After a successful career in South America, Europe, and the United States, De Antonis was incapacitated for more than two years after being hit by a motorcycle in 2012. While a rideshare driver in Miami, he was "rediscovered" by a passenger and subsequently appeared on season 12 of America's Got Talent.

== Early life ==
De Antonis was born Carlos De Antonio in Tandil, Buenos Aires province, Argentina to a Roman father and Sevillan mother. He has two sisters, Patricia and María. De Antonis sang a capella in school and was part of the Unicén Choir, overseen by Bernardo Moroder, who encouraged him to go to Buenos Aires to study. De Antonis moved there in 1989. He attended university for systems engineering and sang in the school choir. He also spent time studying abroad in Italy, France, Spain, Germany, and the United States with teachers including Frank Scioli, Andres Risso, Oscar Ruiz, Natalia Biffis, and Sofía Galicia. At some point in early adulthood, he changed his last name from De Antonio to De Antonis.

== Career ==
Carlos De Antonis and Muhammad Ali at Celebrity Fight Night XIII (2007)

In 1991, De Antonis was cast as the Mad Sailor in Cibrián-Mahler's Drácula, which debuted at Luna Park. He joined the rest of the cast for a South American tour in 1994. De Antonis was then cast as Quasimodo in the debut run of the Cibrián-Mahler show El Jorobado de París, which also appeared at Luna Park, and De Antonis reprised his role for the show's 1995 tour around Argentina. In 1996, he played the lead in the musical La Fiesta del Año in Uruguay. In 1997, he was in both Pepe Cibrián Campoy's Sueños and Ricky Morales' La Mitad de Algo. In 1998, he appeared in the zarzuela Luisa Fernanda. During this period, he also sang with the Laguna Choir. His early career in Argentina saw him onstage in Teatro Colón and Teatro Avenida in Buenos Aires; and Teatro Argentino in La Plata.

De Antonis moved to Germany in 2000, where he was selected as a tenor for the Concert Forum Berlin. He performed in opera houses across 43 cities in Germany and at the closing of the World Class Polo 2000 and the Grand Ball in Berlin's Adlon Hotel. He was with the Dutch company Concert Music in 2001 and performed in the Netherlands, Germany, and Belgium in Drei Jungen Tenoren. In 2002, he joined the Micheal Tietz Company and worked with the Enrico Caruso Gala and the Music Concert Company. In 2003, he appeared in Sogno d'Oriente and Gala Lirica. Over the next few years, he toured across Germany, France, Italy, Spain, Mexico, Argentina, Canada, Denmark, Uruguay, Chile, and the United States. In 2005, he played Alfredo in La traviata in La Plata, the Duke of Mantua in Rigoletto, Fenton in Falstaff, and in L'elisir d'amore. He debuted at the G. Verdi Conservatory in Milan in 2006 and played Count Almaviva in The Barber of Seville, Rinuccio in Gianni Schicchi, and Rodolfo in La bohème. In 2006, he appeared in Pomeriggi Musicali al Rossetti at the Teatro Rossetti in Trieste and as Edgardo in Lucia di Lammermoor. Around this time, he was also connected to the Giovane Balletto Italiano company.

While living in Italy, he met Muhammad Ali's former manager Harlan Werner through a mutual friend. Werner was interested in moving into the music industry and spent six months convincing De Antonis, who was already enjoying success in Europe, to come to Los Angeles. In 2006, De Antonis accepted the offer to be represented by SPS Records and relocated to the United States. There, thanks in part to Werner's extensive network, his fruitful career continued. Early on, he was booked by Sharon Stone for one of her events and performed at Royce Hall. In 2007, he began recording Del Cuore, his debut album, with producer Kim Scharnberg. Del Cuore contained 11 song across multiple genres and languages, and track 6 features a duet with Linda Eder. De Antonis was one of the performers, along with Michael Bublé, Diana Ross, Reba McEntire, Josh Groban, and Neil Sedaka, at Celebrity Fight Night XIII in Phoenix, Arizona in March 2007.

In 2012, he was invited to sing a song from Les Misérables at the Oscars. On his way to rehearsal with the orchestra, he was hit by a motorcycle and broke both legs. While doctors initially thought they would have to amputate, they were able to prevent it. He spent a year and a half in the hospital and an additional eight months in rehabilitation relearning how to walk. Bankrupt by medical bills due to lack of health insurance, he relocated to Miami and started driving for Lyft and Uber. De Antonis began filming himself doing mini-concerts for his rideshare passengers. On one occasion, he sang happy birthday to music producer John Schneider, who suggested he audition for America's Got Talent. While his performances impressed Mel B, Howie Mandel, and Heidi Klum, he was eliminated during the Judge Cuts and did not proceed to the quarterfinals.

During the COVID-19 pandemic, he started a show online called Opera Chef, where he sang opera while cooking. In 2022, he reprised his role as the Mad Sailor in a revival of Cibrián-Mahler's Dracula starring the original cast, 31 years after the original production. Since appearing on America's Got Talent, De Antonis has visited schools and performed at a number of events, including as a guest chef at the Friendship Circle's Culinary Club in 2023.

== Personal life ==
As of 2023, he lives in Germany. He speaks 4 languages.
