= La Esmeralda =

La Esmeralda may refer to:

- La Esmeralda, Chihuahua, rural community in Ojinaga Municipality, Chihuahua, Mexico
- La Esmeralda, Panama
- La Esmeralda, Uruguay, seaside resort in Rocha Department
- La Esmeralda, Venezuela, town in Amazonas, Venezuela
- La Esmeralda (ballet) by Cesare Pugni
- La Esmeralda (opera) by Louise Bertin
- Escuela Nacional de Pintura, Escultura y Grabado "La Esmeralda", a Mexican art school

== See also ==
- Esmeralda (disambiguation)
