= Betty Lambert =

Canadian writer

- Born: August 23, 1933; Calgary, Alberta, Canada
- Died: November 4, 1983 (aged 50); Burnaby, British Columbia

Betty Lambert, born Elizabeth Minnie Lee (August 23, 1933 – November 4, 1983) was a Canadian writer.

Lambert was born in Calgary, Alberta, Canada, to Christopher and Bessie Lee (née Cooper), the oldest of three daughters.

She graduated from the University of British Columbia, Vancouver, in 1957.

She married Frank Lambert in 1952. They were divorced in 1962. Betty had a daughter in 1964.

Lambert received the 1956 Brissenden Creative Writing Award and the 1957 Macmillan Best Short Story Award.

In 1965, she joined the English Department of the newly founded Simon Fraser University, where she eventually became professor.

Lambert died in Burnaby, British Columbia, in 1983.

Her work includes over seventy stage, radio, and television plays; additionally, works of both long and short fiction. While handling a broad range of topics, many of her works deal with feminism, strong women, and sexual violence.

== Works ==
- The Pony (1956)
- The Best Room in the House (radio play, 1959)
- The Good of the Sun (radio play, 1960)
- Falconer's Island (radio play, 1966)
- Tumult with Indians (children's play, 1967; winner of the Canadian Centennial Award for best historical children's play)
- The Visitor (performed at the Vancouver Playhouse production history 1968–1969)
- The Dandy Lion (1972)
- The Popcorn Man (1973)
- The Riddle Machine (children's play, 1974)
- Sqrieux-de-Dieu (comedy, 1976)
- Guilt (short story, 1978)
- The Last Dinner (1979)
- Crossings (novel, 1979; nominated for the Books in Canada First Novel Award)
- Clouds of Glory (1980)
- Jennie's Story (1981; finalist for the 1982 Governor General's Awards; winner of the 1984 Floyd S. Chalmers Canadian Play Award; basis for the movie Heart of the Sun (1999))
- Under the Skin (drama, 1985)
- Grasshopper Hill (radio play; winner of the ACTRA Award for best radio drama)
