= Teresa Bertinotti =

Italian opera singer

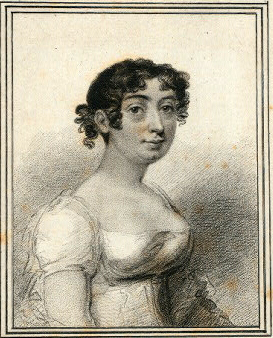
Teresa Bertinotti (1776–1854)

Teresa Bertinotti (also known as Teresa Bertinotti-Radicati) (1776 – 12 Feb 1854) was an Italian soprano and voice teacher. She created leading roles in several operas, including Simon Mayr's Ginevra di Scozia.

== Biography ==
Bertinotti was born in Savigliano in the Kingdom of Sardinia, but grew up in Naples, Kingdom of Naples, where her parents moved when she was two years old. At the age of four, she had her first music lessons and made her first stage appearance as a child singer at the Teatro San Carlo when she was 12. She studied singing with Baldassare La Barbiera and by the age of 20 had already sung at both La Scala and La Fenice. She went on to sing throughout Italy as well as in Germany, Austria, Portugal, Russia, the Netherlands, Ireland and England. She had a great success in The Magic Flute and Così fan tutte at London's King's Theatre, where she appeared between 1811 and 1812.

In 1801, she married the violinist and composer Felice Radicati (1775-1823), whom she had met in Turin, and the couple travelled throughout Europe together. Radicati composed several works for his wife's voice, including his opera Fedra, which Bertinotti sang in her first season at the King's Theatre. He is also said to have composed several arias for her to interpolate in Vincenzo Federici's Zaira for its first London performance in 1811. The couple settled in Bologna in 1815 when Radicati became leader of the municipal orchestra there and maestro di cappella at the San Petronio Basilica. Following Radicati's death in 1823, Bertinotti retired from the stage and taught singing. Amongst her pupils were Carolina Cuzzani, who became a prima donna at La Scala, and Balbina Steffenone, who sang Leonora in the American premiere of Il trovatore.

Teresa Bertinotti died in Bologna at the age of 78.

== Roles ==
Roles created

- I permestra in Angelo Tarchi's Le Danaidi (Milan, 1794)
- Rossana in Ferdinando Paer's Rossana (Milan, 1795)
- Ginevra in Mayr's Ginevra di Scozia (Trieste, 1801)
- Zulira in Nicolini's La selvaggia nel Messico (Bologna, 1803)
- Virginia in Vincenzo Federici's La Virginia (Ferrara, 1805)
- Fedra in Felice Radicati's Fedra (London 1811)
- Telaira in Felice Radicati's Castore e Polluce (Bologna, 1815)
- Minerva in Farinelli's Il vero eroismo ossia Adria serenata (Venice, 1815)

Other roles

- Berenice in Luigi Caruso's Antigono
- Merope in Sebastiano Nasolini's Merope e Polifonte
- Amenaide in Rossini's Tancredi
- Donna Anna in Mozart's Don Giovanni
- Pamina in Mozart's The Magic Flute
- Fiordiligi in Mozart's Così fan tutte
- Fecennia in Pietro Generali's I baccanali di Roma
- Zenobia in Rossini's Aureliano in Palmira

== Sources ==
- Bozoli, Giuseppe, "Radicati, Felice Maurizio", Biografia degli Italiani illustri nelle scienze, lettere ed arti del secolo XVIII, e de' contemporanei Volume 4, pp. 400–402, Alvisopoli, 1837 (in Italian)
- Casaglia, Gherardo (2005)."Teresa Bertinotti". L'Almanacco di Gherardo Casaglia (in Italian).
- De Bekker, L. J. (ed), "Bertinotti, Teresa", Stokes Encyclopedia of Music and Musicians, Volume 1, p. 67. Originally published in 1908 and published in facsimile by Read Books, 2007. ISBN 1-4067-7180-5
- Green, Janet M. and Hubbard, William Lines, "Bertinotti, Teresa", Musical Biographies, Originally published in 1908 and published in facsimile by Read Books in 2008, p. 71. ISBN 1-4097-7867-3
- Grove, George, "Bertinotti, Teresa", A Dictionary of Music and Musicians (A.D. 1450-1889) Vol. 1, Macmillan & Co., 1900, p. 248.
- Meyerbeer, Giacomo, The Diaries of Giacomo Meyerbeer: The last years, 1857-1864 (translated and annotated by Robert Ignatius Le Tellier, Fairleigh Dickinson University Press, 2004. ISBN 0-8386-3845-7
- Nicassio, Susan Vandiver, Tosca's Rome: The Play and the Opera in Historical Perspective, University of Chicago Press, 2002. ISBN 0-226-57972-7
- Romani, Luigi, Teatro alla Scala: cronologia di tutti gli spettacoli rappresentati in questo teatro dal giorno del solenne suo aprimento sino ad oggi, Luigi di Giacomo Pirola, 1862.
- Wesley, Samuel, The letters of Samuel Wesley: professional and social correspondence, 1797-1837 (edited and annotated by Philip Olleson), Oxford University Press, 2001. ISBN 0-19-816423-8
