= Charles Jefferys =

English music publisher & composer (1807–1865)

- Born: 11 January 1807
- Died: 9 June 1865 (aged 58); London, England
- Occupations: Music publisher; composer
- Musical career
- Genres: Opera; popular

Charles Jefferys (11 January 1807 – 9 June 1865, in London) was an English music publisher and composer of songs.

== Career ==
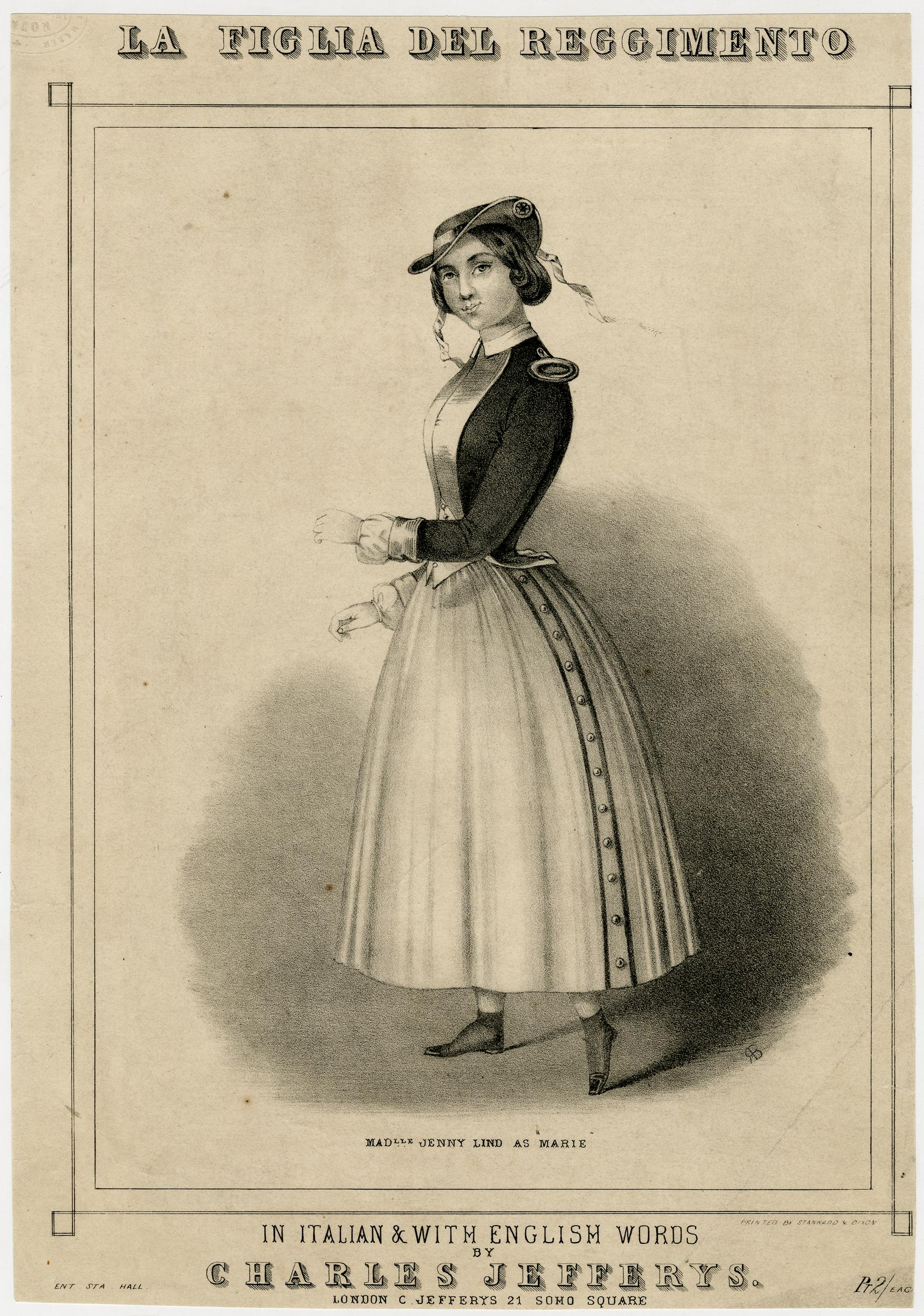
Jefferys translation of La Figlia del Reggimento, c. 1849

Jefferys carried on a London music publishing business. In 1854, he won a legal action with Thomas Boosey, respecting copyright in Italian operas, after appeal to the House of Lords. He published A Book of Beauty for the Queen's Boudoir, a Musical Annual (1853, 1854), and seven numbers of Jeffery's Musical Journal in 1864.

He translated Victor Hugo's opera libretto La Esmeralda into English in 1856. He wrote the text for The Gipsy's Vengeance, an English version of Verdi's Il trovatore, performed at the Theatre Royal, Drury Lane, in 1856, as well as an English version of Luisa Miller, performed at Sadler's Wells Theatre in 1858.

He also wrote the lyrics of several popular songs, including "Rose of Allandale", "Mary of Argyle" and "Jeannett's Farewell to Jeannot", and he composed "Rose Atherton", "Oh Erin, My Country!" and other songs.
