= Balbina Steffenone =

Italian singer

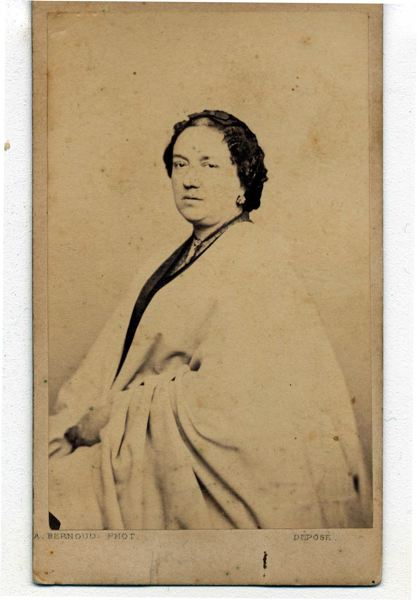
Photograph of Steffenone, c. 1860

Balbina Steffenone (also spelled Bina or Steffanone or Steffenoni, 1825–1896) was a 19th-century soprano.

Born in Turin, Kingdom of Sardinia, she studied in Bologna under Teresa Bertinotti, debuting as Lucia in Macerata in 1842. After singing across Italy, she spent the years 1845 to 1847 singing at the Royal Opera House, Covent Garden, then went to North America, where she stayed for seven years. Her appearances ranged from Boston to Mexico City and Havana, where she remained a principal in the company under Giovanni Bottesini around 1850 with whom she was involved in the second performance of the National Anthem of Mexico in September 1854.

She sang in the American premiere of Il trovatore at the Academy of Music in New York, sharing the roles of Leonora and Ines in the production. On her return from Cuba in 1855, when she played Lucrezia Borgia in the opera, The New York Times called her "one of the few worth welcoming back again"; but critic Richard Grant White wrote that her voice had deteriorated into "a bewildered shriek".

She continued her career in Europe, appearing in Vienna in 1859 and Naples in 1860–61, where she created Errico Petrella's Morosina. She is reported to have retired in 1862, but also to have taken part in the première of Vincenzo Battista's Giovanna di Castiglia at the Teatro San Carlo in Naples in 1863.

She died in Naples in 1896.
