= Ginevra di Scozia =

Opera by Simon Mayr

Ginevra di Scozia is an opera in two acts by Simon Mayr set to an Italian libretto by Gaetano Rossi based on Antonio Salvi's Ginevra, principessa di Scozia, which in turn was adapted from cantos 5 and 6 of Ludovico Ariosto's Orlando Furioso. Ginevra di Scozia premiered on 21 April 1801 at the Regio Teatro Nuovo in Trieste to celebrate the inauguration of the new theatre. The story is virtually identical to that of Handel's Ariodante which shares the same source for the libretto.

== Roles ==
Roles, voice types, premiere cast
Role	Voice type	Premiere cast 21 April 1801
Ginevra, daughter of the King of Scotland	soprano	Teresa Bertinotti
Ariodante, an Italian soldier prince, betrothed to Ginevra	soprano castrato	Luigi Marchesi
Polinesso, Duke of Albany, Ariodante's rival	tenor	Giacomo David
Dalinda, attendant on Ginevra, secretly in love with Polinesso	soprano	Angiola Pirovani-Bianchi
Re di Scozia, King of Scotland	bass	
Lurcanio, Ariodante's brother	tenor	Gaetano Bianchi
Vafrino, Ariodante's squire	tenor	Pietro Righi
Gran Solitario, a hermit	bass	

== Recordings ==
- Mayr: Ginevra di Scozia – Live recording to celebrate the 200th anniversary of the opera's premiere. Tiziano Severini conducts the orchestra and chorus of the Teatro Lirico "Giuseppe Verdi", with Elizabeth Vidal as Ginevra and Daniela Barcellona as Ariodante. Label: Opera Rara ORC 23
- Mayr: Ginevra di Scozia – Live recording. George Petrou, conductor, Münchner Rundfunkorchester with Myrtò Papatanasiu, Anna Bonitatibus, Mario Zeffiri. Label : Oehms Classics OC 960
