= El Jorobado de París =

Argentinian musical

El Jorobado de París is an Argentinian musical based on the Victor Hugo novel Notre-Dame de Paris, created by Pepe Cibrián Campoy (book and lyrics) and Ángel Mahler (original music). It premiered at Estadio Luna Park in 1993. A new version ran in 1995, also at Estadio Luna Park. It went on tour in Argentina in 1999, and was revived in 2006 at Opera Theater of Buenos Aires, at Teatro Cervantes in 2007, and in 2013, in commemoration of its 20th anniversary, at Teatro Presidente Alvear.

== Plot ==
A baby boy is abandoned at Notre-Dame, due to his disfigured appearance. Claudio Frollo, the Archdeacon of the city, takes in the child and relegates him to living in the bell tower, so no one will see him. Elsewhere in the city, the young Esmeralda has grown up among the Roma, separated from her mother. As an adult, her beauty entrances the men around her. Claudio Frollo becomes attracted to Esmeralda, as does Quasimodo. But while Quasimodo strives to protect Esmeralda, Claudio Frollo is driven to commit atrocities in order to be with her.

== Productions ==
The original version was produced by Tito Lectoure. It had 70 actors and a live orchestra conducted by Angel Mahler, who also did the orchestrations. The set design was done by Carlos López Cifani, costuming by Fabián Luca, arrangements and choral direction by Gabriel Giangrante, and lighting, choreography, setting, and general direction by Pepe Cibrián Campoy.

Although the million-dollar production was ambitious, especially in its set design and costuming, it did not reach the success of its predecessor, Dracula, el musical. However, it is one of the most recognizable works of the Cibrián-Mahler duo.

In 1995 a new version, El Jorobado de Paris II, was created with a 40 actor cast. It was a commercial failure. Carlos de Antonio returned to reprise his role as Quasimodo. The show also marked Elena Roger's theatrical debut.

In 2006 the Teatro Opera production combined the 1993 and 1995 versions, with a cast of 20 actors.

In September 2007, at the Teatro Cervantes, a cast comprising the members of the docu-reality show made by Cibrián-Mahler on Channel 7 was presented.

In 2013 a production was developed for the show's 20th anniversary. This version utilized far fewer actors and simpler set. After its initial performances at Teatro Presidente Alvear it toured to some theatres around the country.

== Casts ==
	1993	1995	1999 Tour	2006	2013
Quasimodo	Carlos de Antonio		Pablo Guglielmino	Ignacio Mintz	
Esmeralda	Paola Krum	Cristina Girona	Romina Groppo	Florencia Benítez	Florencia Spinelli
Claudio Frollo	Fernando Ciuffo	Rodolfo Valss	Claudio Acevedo	Juan Rodo	Diego Duarte Conde
Pierre	Alejandro Crea	Zenón Recalde	Sergio di Croce		Mauro Murcia
La Paquette	Fabiana Bruni				Adriana Rolla
Magot	Patricia Bravi	Karina K	Tiki Lovera		Manuela Perín
Truhan	Gustavo Monje				Diego Cáceres
Confesor		Pablo Toyos	Santiago Sirur		
Filipon	Guillermo Antonini				Nicolás Bertolotto
Febo	Hernán Kuttel		Alberto Heredia		Ramiro Moreno
Judge	Horacio Oriez				
Judge's assistant	Julio César Fernández				
Hechicera			Ayelen Godoy		

== Cast recordings ==
The 1993 version was released on two CDs, one double and one singles, recorded by the La Isla studio, with the voices of Paola Krum, Carlos de Antonio, Fernando Ciuffo, Fabiana Bruni, Patricia Bravi, Gustavo Monje, Alejandro Crea and Fernando Mercado. The double disc was remastered and rereleased in 2013, for the show's 20th anniversary.

El Jorobado de Paris II was also released on a single CD, recorded by La Isla studio in 1995 and with the same cast that performed it.
