= Ángel Mahler =

Argentine, conductor and composer (1960–2025)

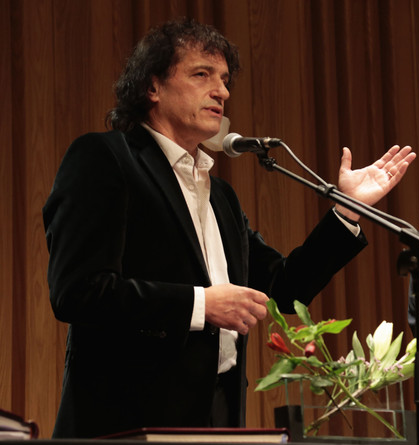
- Mahler in 2016

Minister of Culture of the City of Buenos Aires
- In office 18 July 2016 – 12 December 2017
- Preceded by: Darío Lopérfido
- Succeeded by: Enrique Avogadro

Personal details
- Born: 23 May 1960 Villa Devoto, Buenos Aires, Argentina
- Died: 25 May 2025 (aged 65) Buenos Aires, Argentina
- Cause of death: Melanoma
- Domestic partner(s): Dolores Stabilini (2010–2025)
- Occupation: Composer, conductor

Ángel Jorge Pititto (23 May 1960 – 25 May 2025), known by the pseudonym Ángel Mahler, was an Argentine composer and conductor. He was the Minister of Culture of the city of Buenos Aires between July 2016 and December 2017.

== Biography ==
Ángel Jorge Pititto was born on 23 May 1960 in Buenos Aires. Throughout his life he conducted and composed a number of musicals, notably El Jorobado de París, Drácula, el musical (1991) and El fantasma de Canterville (2003).

Pititto died in Buenos Aires on 25 May 2025 at the age of 65.
