= Tom Cone =

Canadian-American playwright and librettist

Thomas Edward Cone (1947 – April 2012) was a Canadian-American playwright and librettist.

Cone's work often presented provocative ideas about morality and art and it stretches existing forms through the integration of music and the visual arts. In many of his plays, characters are "riding a fault line, about to make a change which may result in tragedy", sharing an "evocative, somewhat taboo recollection of their common past". In True Mummy two former lovers who once crossed a dangerous line together, are reunited. The title of the play refers to a black, luminous glaze used by artists such as J. M. W. Turner, that was made from the ash of cremated mummies. Visions of life and death of an Egyptian Princess form alternating scenes, and, as she is being prepared for mummification, towards the end of the play when a Turner painting is displayed, it becomes clear that she is on it.

Other plays include Herringbone, Stargazing and Love at Last Sight and Cone wrote librettos for operas The Architect (for Vancouver Opera, 1993), The Gang (Vancouver New Music, 1997), and Game Misconduct (Vancouver Playhouse 2000). He also wrote adaptations of Molière's The Miser and Goldoni's The Servant of Two Masters which were performed at the Stratford Festival where he was a writer-in-residence between 1978 and 1980.

Cone adapted Herringbone into a musical in 1981, with music by Skip Kennon and lyrics by Ellen Fitzhugh. It premiered in Chicago followed by productions in New York at Playwrights Horizons, in London at The King's Head Theatre, at the Edinburgh Festival, at Hartford Stage starring Joel Grey, and in many cities throughout North America. From 2007 to 2009 it toured Williamstown Theater Festival, McCarter Theatre (Princeton, NJ) and the La Jolla Playhouse (CA) in a production starring BD Wong, directed by Roger Rees. Tom Cone lived in Vancouver where he was an active curator and promoter of experimental music and the avant-garde. He died in April 2012 of cancer. He was survived by his wife Karen Matthews and child Ruby Cone.

== Selected works ==
- There (1972)
- The Organiser (1973)
- Cubistique (1974)
- Herringbone (1975)
- Whisper To Mendelsohn (1975)
- The Imaginary Invalid (1975)
- Beautiful Tigers (1976)
- Shotglass (1977)
- Stargazing (1978)
- 1792 (1978)
- The Writer's Show (1978)
- The Servant Of Two Masters (1980)
- The Architect (1993)
- True Mummy (1997)
- Donald and Lenore (2008)
