= Esmeralda (Battista) =

1856 opera by Vincenzo Battista and Charles Jefferys

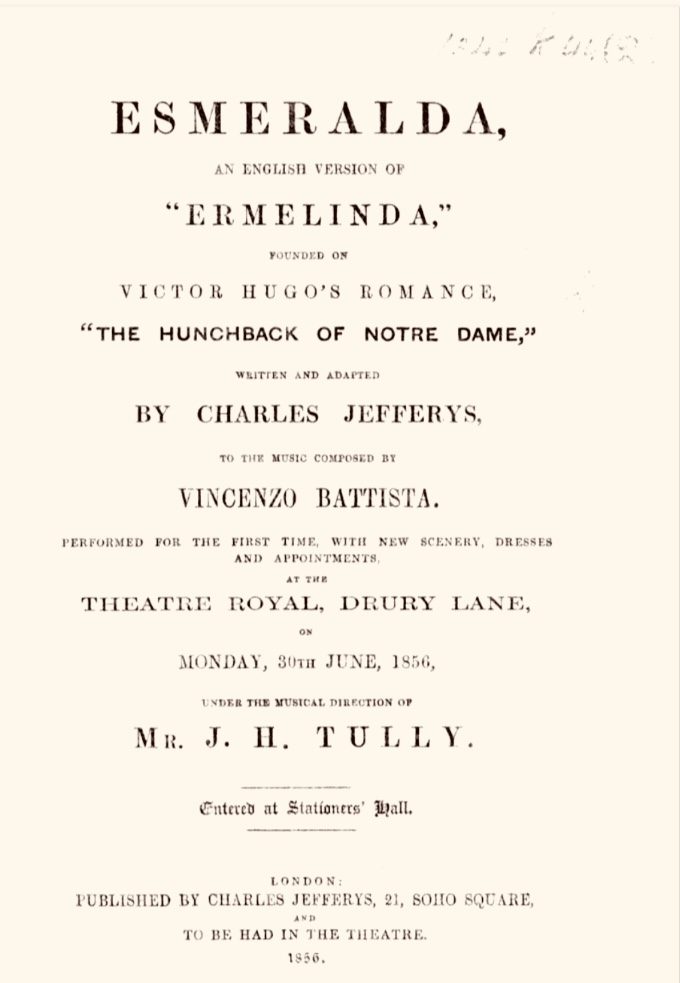
Cover of the score of Esmeralda (1856)

Esmeralda is an 1856 grand opera in four acts with a score by the Italian composer Vincenzo Battista. With a libretto in English by Charles Jefferys, it was based on Battista's Italian version Ermelinda (1851), which in turn was based on Hugo's 1831 novel The Hunchback of Notre-Dame.

In 1851 in Naples in Italy Battista was at the height of his fame and powers. He had already staged a number of operas at the prestigious Teatro di San Carlo including Margherita d'Aragona (1844) with the soprano Fanny Goldberg, the tenor Gaetano Fraschini and the baritone Filippo Coletti. His opera Rosvina de la Forest (1845) was commissioned by La Scala in Milan.

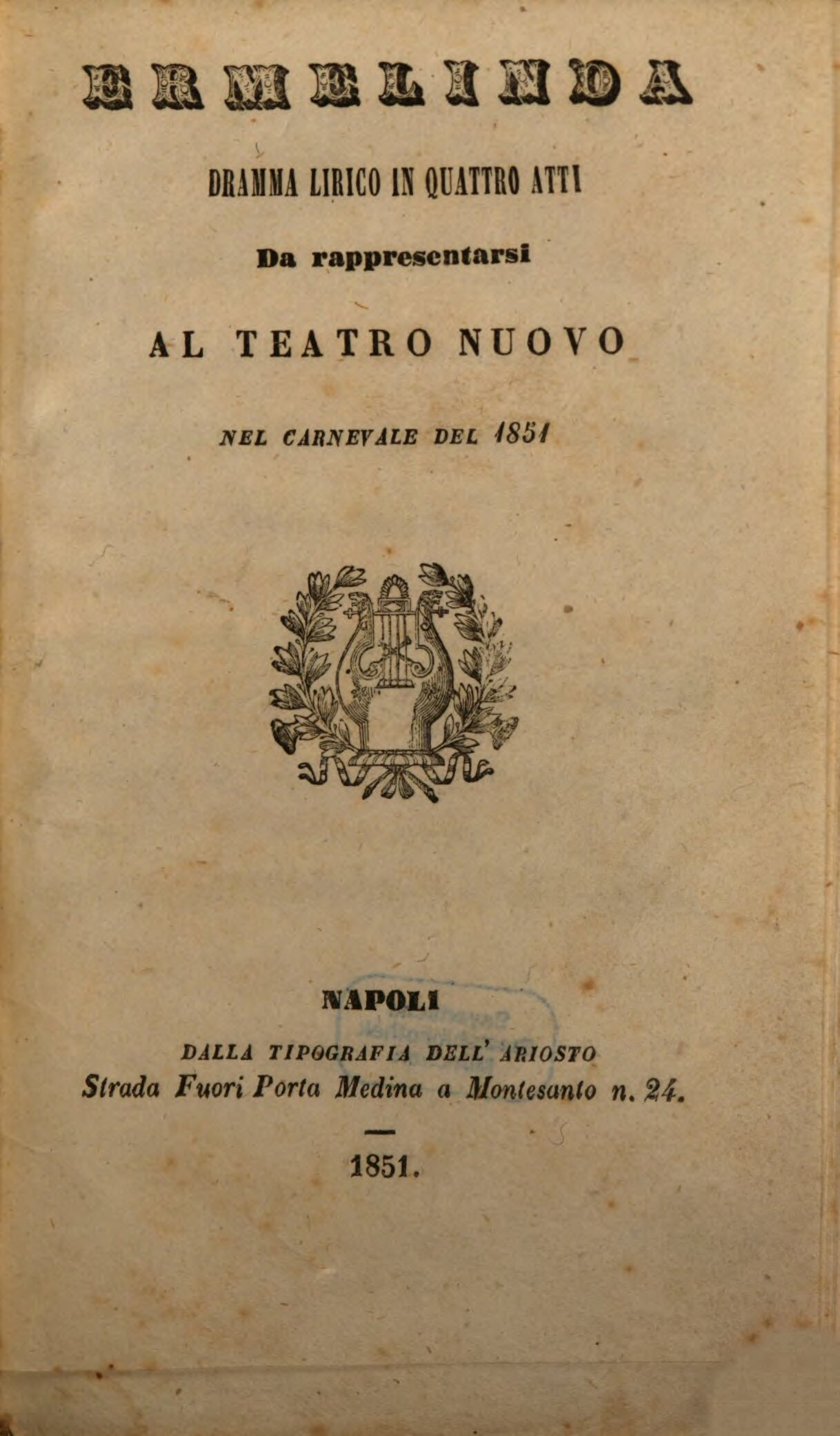
Cover of the score for Ermelinda (1851)

To a libretto in Italian by Domenico Bolognese (1919–1891) he composed the score for Ermelinda (1851), which in turn was based on Hugo's 1831 novel The Hunchback of Notre-Dame. The opera opened as Esmeralda at the Theatre Royal, Drury Lane on 30 June 1856 under the musical direction of J. H. Tully and with a libretto in English by Charles Jefferys.

== Naples cast (1851) ==
- Ermelinda - Signora Violette Evrard
- Guido di Lancry, Captain of the Archers - Sig. Agresti
- Giulio Laroche, a poet - Sig. Cammarano
- Paolo Fulvi, brother of the Baroness - Sig. Evrard
- Baronessa de Gontran - Signora Silvestri
- Elisa, her daughter - Signora Eboli
- Roben, chief of the Gypsies - Sig. Grandillo
- Quasimodo the Hunchback - Sig. Luigi Fioravanti
- Morepin, another relative of the Baronessa - Sig. N. N.

Choir of Archers - Gypsies — Nobles invited to the party - the Bourgeois. Appearance of Citizens and Soldiers

The scene is set in Madrid. The time is 1482.

== London cast (1856) ==
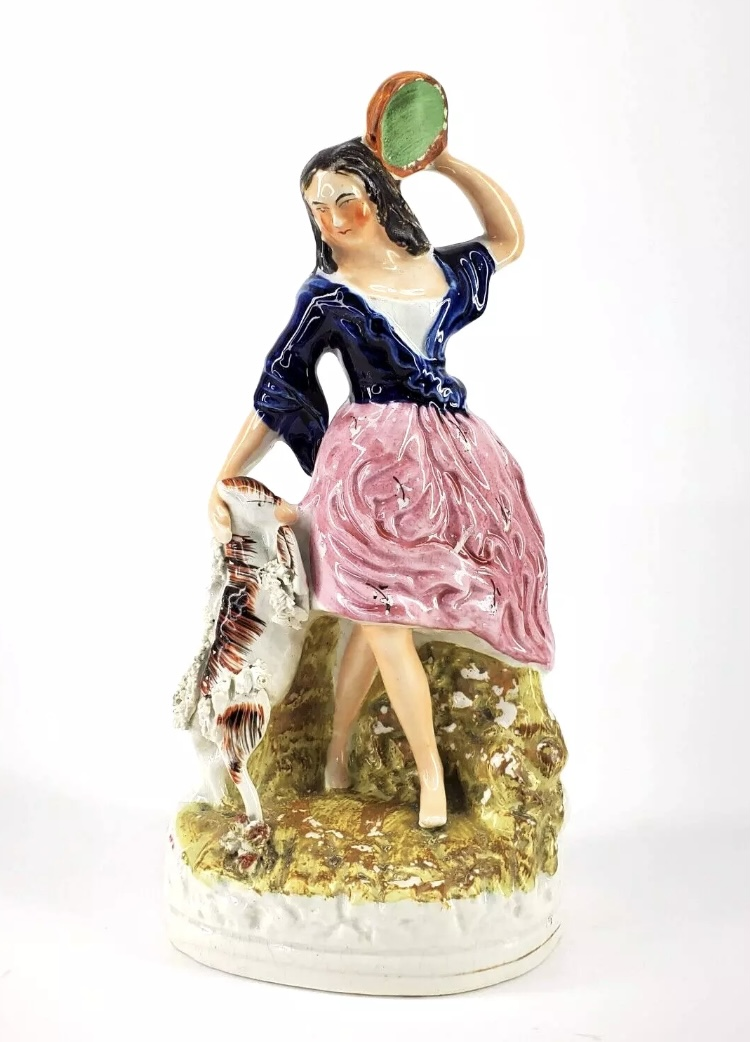
Glazed earthenware figure of Lucy Escott in Esmeralda (c1856)

- Esmeralda, the Gitana - Lucy Escott
- Fleur de Lys - Elizabeth Haigh-Dyer
- Eloisa, Mother of Fleur de Lys - Miss Atkinson
- Morepin, Father of Fleur de Lys- Mr. J. W. Morgan
- Phoebus, Captain of the Archers - Mr. Henry Haigh
- Gringoire, the Poet - Mr. Charles Manvers
- Claude Frollo, the Monk - Mr. Charles Durand
- Quasimodo, the Hunchback - Mr. Conrad Borrani
- Clopin, King of the Gipsies - Mr. Hamilton

Chorus-of Gipsies, Archers, Nobles, Citizens and Soldiers.

The Scene is in Paris—Time 1482.

== Songs ==
- Zephyr-like I woo the Flower — "Sono l'aura d'ogni fior" - Lucy Escott (soprano)
- I am like a sportive Fay - "Sono figlia al ciel al mar" - Lucy Escott
- Loathed as a monster from birth am I - Conrad Borrani
- I love; and she I love is fair - Charles Durand
- Fair Ladye-Moon, pray tell me - "Rispondi amica luna" - Lucy Escott
- Recitation: These gay scenes make me sad of heart — "Come tutti festreggiano me lasso" - Henry Haigh
- Romance: In her absence I still am pining — "Senza un guardo un tuo concento" - Henry Haigh
- Baritone: I love, and she I love is fair - "Una leggiadra vergine" - Charles Durand
- Tell me, ye powers above me - "Dimmi dimmi irato Dio" - Charles Durand
- Comic Scena: Noble signors, now pray hear me- "Ah! Miei signori che mai dite" - Charles Manvers

=== Duets ===
- Baritone and Bass: Idiot, leave me, I renounce thee - Charles Durand and Conrad Borrani
- Soprano and Tenor: Good sir, noble captain, from death thou hast saved me - Lucy Escott and Henry Haigh
- ditto: How benignant, how noble, how graceful - “Qual colomba, d’amore, foriera” - Lucy Escott and Henry Haigh
- ditto: Thou art near me, and in thy presence- “Vedi, vedi, a te vicino” - Lucy Escott and Henry Haigh
- Comic Duet: Gringoire, come hither - “Ei, si fermi, eccomi, avanti” - Lucy Escott and Charles Manvers
- Comic Duet: I like a gentle lamb will be - “Come agnelletto placido" - Lucy Escott and Charles Manvers

=== Trio ===
- The Archer's Chorus—In the darkness of the night - “I noltriam dell’ombra insen” - Henry Haigh and Chorus
