= James Schevill =

American poet

- Born: James Erwin Schevill; June 10, 1920; Berkeley, California, United States
- Died: January 30, 2009 (aged 88); Berkeley, California, United States
- Occupations: Poet; critic; playwright; professor
- Spouse(s): Helen Shaner (married 1942, divorced 1966); Margot Helmuth Blum (married 1967)
- Children: Deborah Schevill; Susanna Schevill
- Writing career
- Notable works: The Stalingrad Elegies (1964) The Black President, and Other Plays (1965); 5 Plays 5 (1967); Lovecraft's Follies (1971) Where to Go, What to Do, When You Are Bern Porter: A Personal Biography (1993)

James Erwin Schevill (June 10, 1920 – January 30, 2009) was an American poet, critic, playwright and professor at San Francisco State University and Brown University, and the recipient of Guggenheim and Ford Foundation fellowships.

== Summary ==
He wrote more than 10 volumes of poetry, 30 plays, many essays, a novel, and biographies of Bern Porter and Sherwood Anderson. His plays include Lovecraft's Follies (1971) (based on the life and work of Providence horror writer H. P. Lovecraft), The Ushers, Mother O, Shadows of Memory, The Last Romantics, Cathedral of Ice, The House on F Street and others. He received a literary award from the American Academy and Institute of Arts and Letters for his plays. He also wrote the libretto for Jerome Rosen's opera.

He was visiting Freiburg, Germany, in 1938 when the Kristallnacht riots occurred, and the experience led him into writing and poetry. Other seminal experiences came from his own family background, travel, and during his Army service. He was influenced by his father, Rudolph Schevill, who created and chaired the department of romance languages at UC Berkeley, and created the West Coast committee in defense of the Spanish republic at the request of his friends Pablo Casals and Fernando de los Rios. His mother Margaret Schevill, was an artist, a scholar of Navaho culture and mythology, and a follower of Carl Jung. As a German speaker, he worked for military intelligence and was assigned to a prisoner of war camp where, despite the denazification program, he saw that Nazis dominated other prisoners, as he described in his novel Cathedral of Ants (1976).

In a 1950 letter to Robert Sproul, the president of the University of California, he refused to sign a loyalty oath, at the time a prerequisite to becoming an instructor at the UC Berkeley. Instead he went on to teach at California College of Arts and Crafts, San Francisco State University, where he headed the Poetry Center, and at Brown University until his retirement.

In 1968, he signed the "Writers and Editors War Tax Protest" pledge, vowing to refuse tax payments in protest against the Vietnam War.

In 1981 he received a Guggenheim Fellowship in Drama and Performance Art. His contributions to the theater began with his strong involvement in the Actors Workshop in San Francisco, and his founding of Wastepaper Theater at Brown University as well as his collaborations with Trinity Reporatory Theater in Providence. He suffered a severe stroke in 1999 which made him a wheelchair user. He died in Berkeley, California, in January 2009.
