= Esmeralda Avenue =

Esmeralda Avenue is a road in a number of towns and cities

== Chile ==
- Esmeralda Avenue Valdivia

== New Zealand ==
- Esmeralda Avenue Avondale Auckland

== Puerto Rico ==
- Esmeralda Avenue Guaynabo, San Juan, Puerto Rico

== United States ==
- Esmeralda Avenue Minden, Nevada
- Esmeralda Avenue San Francisco, California
- Esmeralda Avenue Cleveland-North Collinwood, Ohio
- Esmeralda Avenue Mesa, Arizona
- Esmeralda Avenue Las Vegas, Nevada
- Esmeralda Avenue El Monte, California
- Esmeralda Avenue Moss Beach, California
- Esmeralda Avenue Dayton, Ohio
