= Esmeralda Island =

Island of the Patagonian Archipelago, Chile

Coordinates: 48.95°S 75.42°W

Geography
- Area: 515.2 km^{2} (198.9 sq mi)
- Coastline: 279.7 km (173.8 mi)
- Highest elevation: 1,250 m (4100 ft)

Administration
- Chile
- Regions of Chile: Magallanes Region

Esmeralda Island (Spanish: Isla Esmeralda) is an island in the Patagonian Archipelago in Magallanes y la Antártica Chilena Region, Chile.

== See also ==
- Juan Guillermos Island also known as Esmeralda Island.
