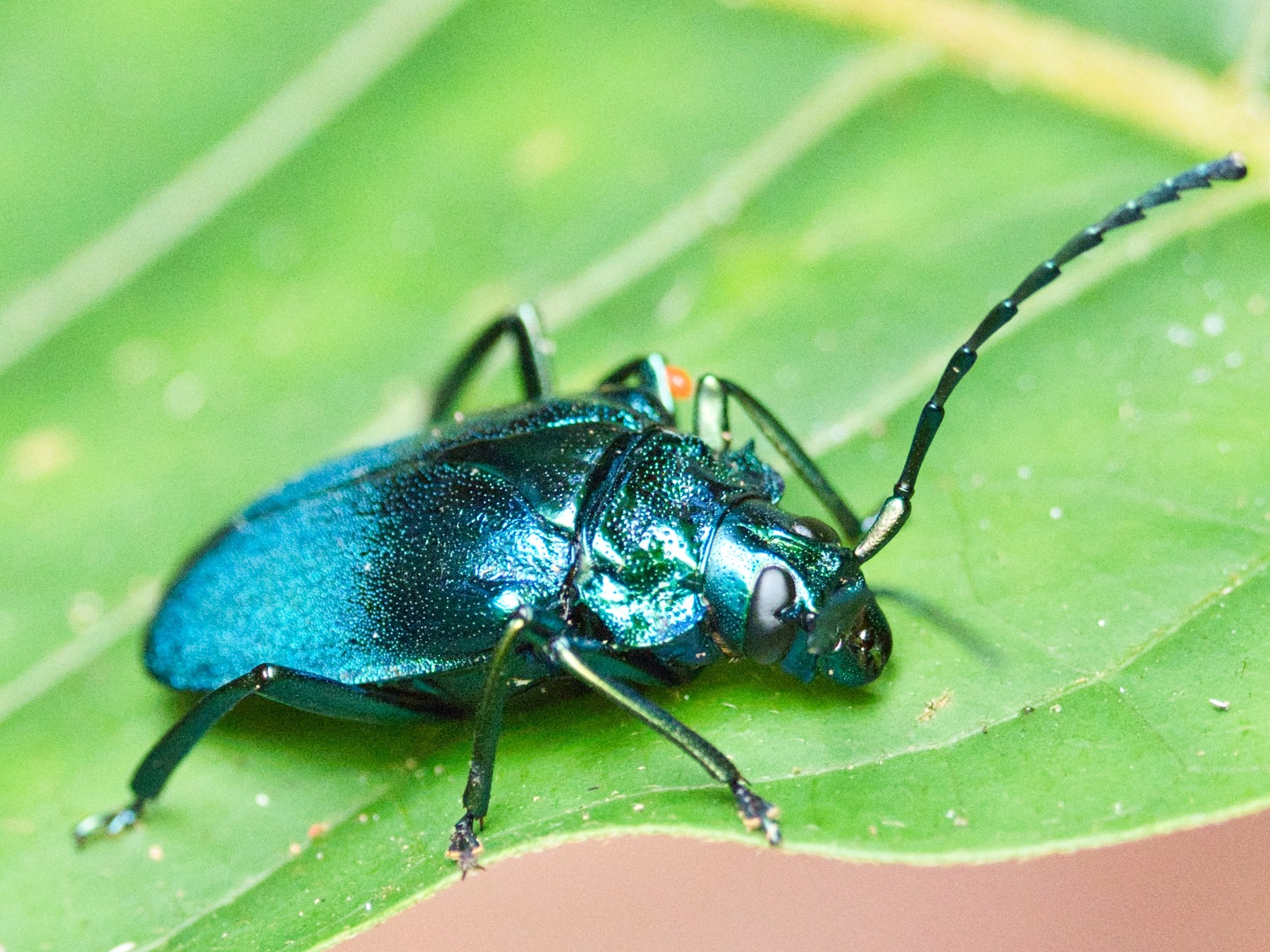
- Esmeralda laetifica

Scientific classification
- Kingdom: Animalia
- Phylum: Arthropoda
- Clade: Pancrustacea
- Class: Insecta
- Order: Coleoptera
- Suborder: Polyphaga
- Infraorder: Cucujiformia
- Family: Cerambycidae
- Subfamily: Prioninae
- Tribe: Mallaspini
- Genus: Esmeralda; Thomson, 1860

= Esmeralda (beetle) =

Genus of beetles

Esmeralda is a genus of beetles in the family Cerambycidae, containing the following species: Species of the genus Esmeralda are found in the Guianas and Brazil.

- Esmeralda coerulea (Schoenherr, 1817)
- Esmeralda costulata Bates, 1891
- Esmeralda laetifica Bates, 1869
- Esmeralda polita (Fragoso & Monné, 1988)
