= HMCS Glace Bay (K414) =

Canadian warship

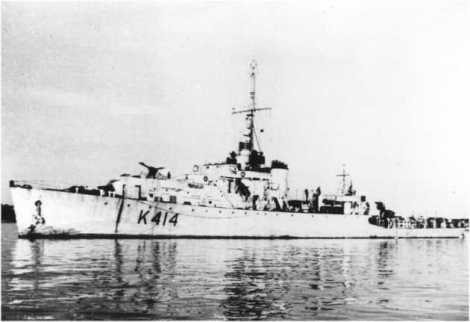
- HMCS Glace Bay

History

Canada
- Name: Glace Bay
- Namesake: Glace Bay, Nova Scotia
- Ordered: June 1942
- Builder: Davie Shipbuilding, Lauzon
- Yard number: 27
- Laid down: 23 September 1943
- Launched: 26 April 1944
- Commissioned: 2 September 1944
- Decommissioned: 17 November 1945
- Identification: K 414
- Honors and awards: Atlantic 1944–1945
- Fate: Sold to Chilean Navy 1946

Chile
- Name: Esmeralda
- Acquired: 1946
- Out of service: 1960
- Renamed: Baquedano (1952)
- Fate: Sold for breaking up 1968

General characteristics
- Class & type: River-class frigate
- Displacement: 1445
- Length: 301.5 ft (91.90 m)o/a
- Beam: 36.6 ft (11.16 m)
- Draught: 9 ft (2.7 m); 13 ft (4.0 m) (deep load)
- Installed power: 5,500 hp (4,100 kW)
- Propulsion: 2 × Admiralty Boilers
- Speed: 20 knots (37.0 km/h)
- Range: 7,200 nautical miles (13,334 km) at 11 knots (20.4 km/h)
- Complement: 8 officers, 133 ratings
- Armament: 2 × QF 4 in (102 mm) /40 Mk.XIX guns; 1 × QF 12 pdr (3 in (76 mm)) 12 cwt /40 Mk. V on mounting HA/LA Mk.IX (not all ships); 10 × 20 mm anti-aircraft Guns (2×2, 6×1); 1 × Hedgehog; 2 × Depth charge tracks

HMCS Glace Bay was a River-class frigate built for the Royal Canadian Navy (RCN) in 1943. Commissioned in 1944 she served in the Battle of the Atlantic until the end of the Second World War. After the war, she was sold to the Chilean Navy and renamed Esmeralda.

Glace Bay was ordered as HMCS Lauzon in June 1942 as part of the 1943-1944 River-class building program. She was laid down on 23 September 1943 by Davie Shipbuilding at Lauzon, Quebec and was launched on 26 April 1944. Her name was changed to Glace Bay, and she was commissioned into the RCN on 2 September 1944 at Lévis, Quebec.

== Background ==
The River-class frigate was designed by William Reed of Smith's Dock Company of South Bank-on-Tees. Originally called a "twin-screw corvette", its purpose was to improve on the convoy escort classes in service with the Royal Navy at the time, including the Flower-class corvette. The first orders were placed by the Royal Navy in 1940 and the vessels were named for rivers in the United Kingdom, giving name to the class. In Canada, they were named for towns and cities, though they kept the same designation. The name "frigate" was suggested by Vice-Admiral Percy W. Nelles of the Royal Canadian Navy and was adopted later that year.

Improvements over the corvette design included improved accommodation, which was markedly better. The twin engines gave only three more knots of speed but extended the range of the ship to nearly double that of a corvette at 7,200 nautical miles (13,300 km) at 12 knots. Among other lessons applied to the design was an armament package better designed to combat U-boats including a twin 4-inch mount forward and 12-pounder aft. 15 Canadian frigates were initially fitted with a single 4-inch gun forward but except for HMCS Valleyfield, they were all eventually upgraded to the double mount. For underwater targets, the River-class frigate was equipped with a Hedgehog anti-submarine mortar and depth charge rails aft and four side-mounted throwers.

River-class frigates were the first Royal Canadian Navy warships to carry the 147B Sword horizontal fan echo sonar transmitter, in addition to the irregular ASDIC. This allowed the ship to maintain contact with targets even while firing, unless a target was struck. Improved radar and direction-finding equipment improved the RCN's ability to find and track enemy submarines over the previous classes.

Canada originally ordered the construction of 33 frigates in October 1941. The design was too big for the shipyards on the Great Lakes so all the frigates built in Canada were built in dockyards along the west coast or along the St. Lawrence River. In all Canada ordered the construction of 60 frigates including ten for the Royal Navy that transferred two to the United States Navy.

== War service ==
Glace Bay worked up at Bermuda and upon her return was assigned to the Mid-Ocean Escort Force escort group C-4. She left for Great Britain escorting a number of American submarines destined for the Russian Navy. Glace Bay was used continuously as an ocean escort for convoys in the North Atlantic until June 1945, when she returned to Canada. She then spent the next few months performing various tasks along the east coast of Canada. After making a round trip to Bermuda in October, Glace Bay was paid off on 17 November 1945 at Sydney, Nova Scotia and laid up at Shelburne.

== Postwar service ==
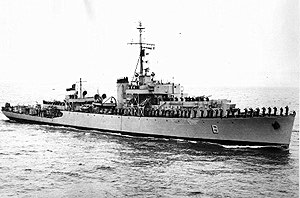
Esmerelda in 1946

In 1946 the ship was purchased by the Chilean Navy and renamed Esmeralda. When the barquentine Esmeralda (BE-43) was launched in 1953, the frigate was renamed Baquedano and continued to serve with the Chilean Navy before being paid off in 1960 and scrapped in 1968.

== See also ==
- List of decommissioned ships of the Chilean Navy
