= Vincenzo Battista =

Italian composer and conductor

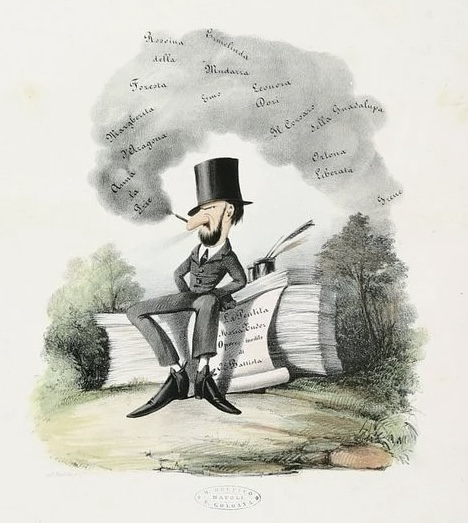
Vincenzo Battista - caricature by Melchiorre Delfico c1855

Vincenzo Maria Battista (5 October 1823–14 November 1873) was an Italian composer and conductor. At first his operas were received with enthusiasm by his compatriots. Today none of his works are in the repertoire of any opera companies, despite the fact that in his lifetime they were performed in the most important theatres in Italy.

== Life ==
Vincenzo (he preferred Vincenzio) Battista was born in Naples in Italy in 1823 - although it may actually have been 1818. He studied at the Conservatorio di Musica San Pietro a Majella in Naples. His first work to be performed was the tragic opera Anna la Prie at the Teatro Nuovo in Naples in February 1843. This was an instant success and audiences marvelled that it could have been written by a 19 year old. Rumours spread that he was older, or that the work had actually been composed by his supposed teacher, a monk called Guidi. His next success was the innovative opera Margherita d'Aragona (1844), at the Teatro di San Carlo with the soprano Fanny Goldberg, the tenor Gaetano Fraschini and the baritone Filippo Coletti. The Milan based bi-weekly magazine Il Pirata in its review praised each song and each singer and documented how many times Battista was called out by the enthusiastic audience. However, a long and detailed article in Museo di Scienze e Letteratura was less enthusiastic, claiming that Battista was being inspired by the wrong role models, a possible reference to Verdi.

By now his fame was spreading, and his next work, Rosvina de la Forest (1845), was commissioned by La Scala in Milan. His opera Eleonora Dori (1847) had a book by the leading librettist Salvadore Cammarano. Marietta Brambilla created the title role in his opera Irene (1847), while the soprano Balbina Steffenone sang in the première of his Giovanna di Castiglia at the Teatro San Carlo in Naples in 1863.

He set to music Canto V of Dante’s Inferno adapting it to the soprano tessitura.

== Later years ==
Battista seems to have suffered the same problem as many other prodigies - an overinflated sense of his own worth. In the salons of Naples Battista would often sing his own salon music with great enthusiasm, much to the amusement of audiences. In addition, an affectionate review of his work in Napoli Musicale commented on his lack of in-depth musical training.

In his last years Battista was living in poverty as interest in his operas waned owing to the increasing popularity of the works of Verdi and the refusal of Casa Ricordi to publish his later scores. Various of his friends blamed the changing tastes of opera goers and his being ignored by the publisher Casa Ricordi and the management of the Teatro San Carlo for his penury and his early death. He died after suffering an apoplectic fit during the rehearsals of a church piece at the Chiesa di San Potito in his native Naples in November 1873 aged 50 or 55. He was survived by three older unmarried sisters. He never married.

The Gazzetta Musicale di Milano (owned by Casa Ricordi) did not give him a separate obituary; instead reporting his passing between reports of a colder than usual winter in Naples and the appointment of a new concert master.

== Selected operas ==
- Anna la Prie (1843)
- Margherita d'Aragona (1844)
- Rosvina de la Forest (1845)
- Emo (1846)
- Eleonora Dori (1847) libretto by Salvadore Cammarano
- Il Corsaro della Guadalupe (1853)
- Irene (1847)
- Ermelinda (1851) performed in London in English as Esmeralda, or The Hunchback of Notre Dame (c1856)
- Ermenilda (1863)
- Giovanna di Castiglia (1863)
- Alba d'Oro (1869)
