= Disney Renaissance =

Period of Disney animated films, 1989–1999

The ten films considered to make up the Disney Renaissance era.

The Disney Renaissance was a period from 1989 to 1999 during which Walt Disney Feature Animation returned to producing commercially and/or critically successful animated films. The ten feature films associated with this period are The Little Mermaid (1989), The Rescuers Down Under (1990), Beauty and the Beast (1991), Aladdin (1992), The Lion King (1994), Pocahontas (1995), The Hunchback of Notre Dame (1996), Hercules (1997), Mulan (1998), and Tarzan (1999).

The Great Mouse Detective (1986), Oliver & Company (1988) and Fantasia 2000 (1999) are also often included, the first two being precursors of the period and the last being the final animated feature film to follow the same artistic pattern as classic Disney films.

The films were mostly musical adaptations of well-known stories, similar to ones produced by Walt Disney from the 1930s to 1960s. They saw great success at the domestic and foreign box office, earning much greater profits than earlier works.

== Background (pre-1989) ==
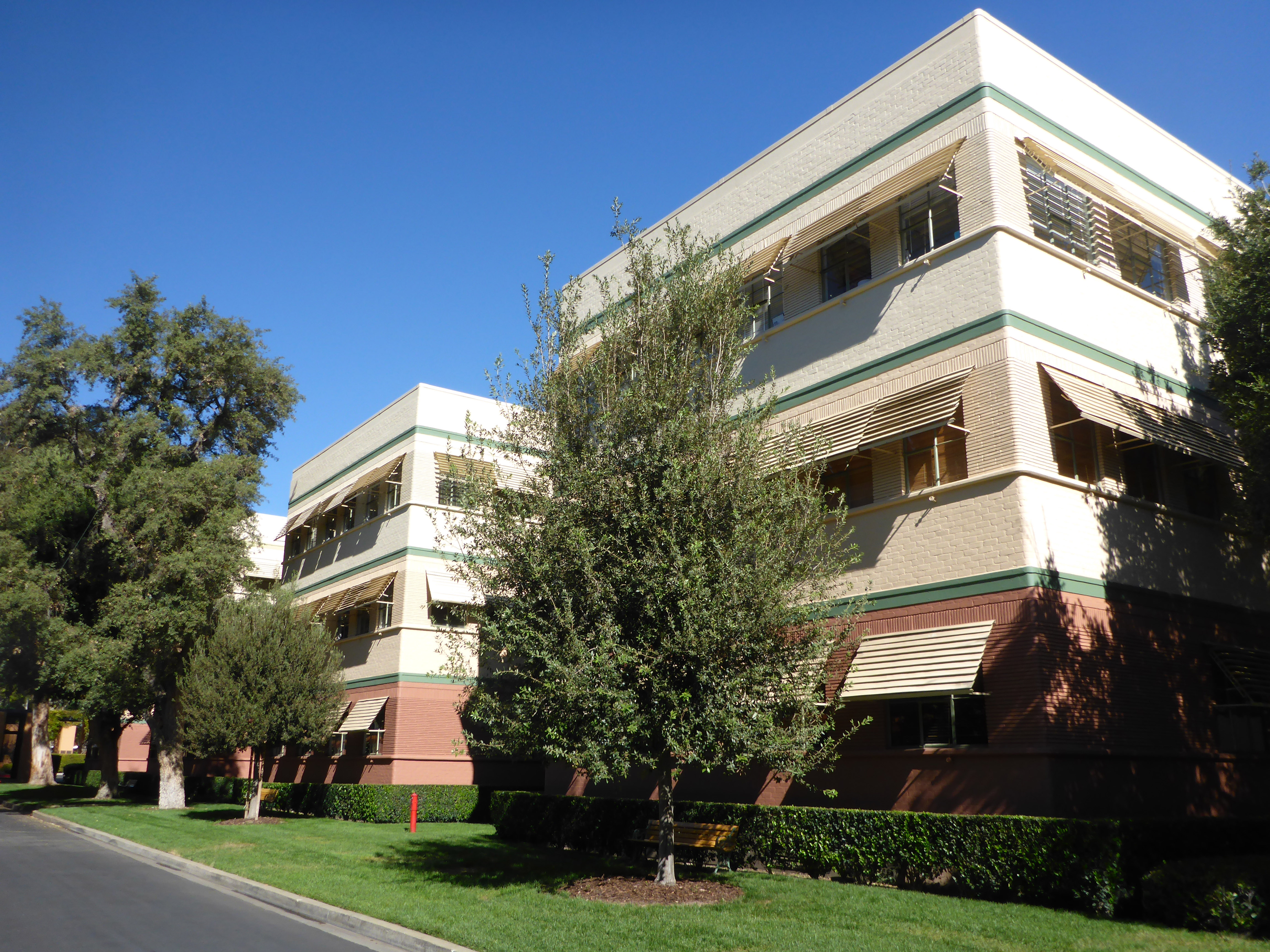
The original Animation Building at the Walt Disney Studios, which the animation department left in 1985.

After the deaths of Walt and Roy O. Disney (in 1966 and 1971, respectively), Walt Disney Productions was left in the hands of Donn Tatum, Card Walker, and Walt's son-in-law, Ron Miller. Under their supervision, creative leadership over feature animated films largely fell to Wolfgang Reitherman.

While certain films, such as The Rescuers (1977), were commercially and critically successful, most of the films released in the two decades after the death of the Disney brothers did not perform as well as the studio's previous work. Reitherman was determined to produce only family-friendly material certain to turn a profit, so he softened Disney villains so that they were more comical or pitiful than scary. During production of The Fox and the Hound (1981), long-time animator Don Bluth left Disney's animation department to start his own rival studio, Don Bluth Productions, taking 11 of Disney's 65 animators with him. Production on The Fox and the Hound was delayed by six months. Don Bluth Productions produced The Secret of NIMH (1982), whose story was rejected by Disney as too dark, and the company became Disney's main competitor in the animation industry during the 1980s and early 1990s.

Disney made organizational changes in the mid-1980s after narrowly escaping a takeover attempt by businessman and financier Saul Steinberg. Following the success of the animated short film Mickey's Christmas Carol (1983), which brought classic Disney characters back to theatrical animation, Michael Eisner, formerly of Paramount Pictures, became CEO in 1984, and he was joined by his Paramount associate Jeffrey Katzenberg as studio chairman, while Frank Wells, formerly of Warner Bros. Pictures, became president. In 1985, Peter Schneider was hired as president of Disney's feature animation department, which was soon to be rebranded as Walt Disney Feature Animation.

On February 1, 1985, to make room for live action filmmaking, the animation department was moved from the main Disney lot in Burbank to a supposedly temporary location in various hangars, warehouses, and trailers about 2 miles (3.2 km) east in nearby Glendale, where it would remain for the next ten years. Most of the Disney Renaissance films were produced there, in the former Grand Central Airport, then known as the Grand Central Business Centre.

The box office failure of The Black Cauldron (1985) put the future of the animation department in jeopardy. Going against a 30-year studio policy, the company founded a television animation division (now Disney Television Animation), which produced such shows as DuckTales. Roy E. Disney, who resigned from the company in 1984, persuaded Eisner to let him return and supervise the animation department in the hopes of improving its fortunes.

=== 1986–1988: The Great Mouse Detective, Disney vs. Don Bluth, Hayao Miyazaki's influence, and Oliver & Company ===
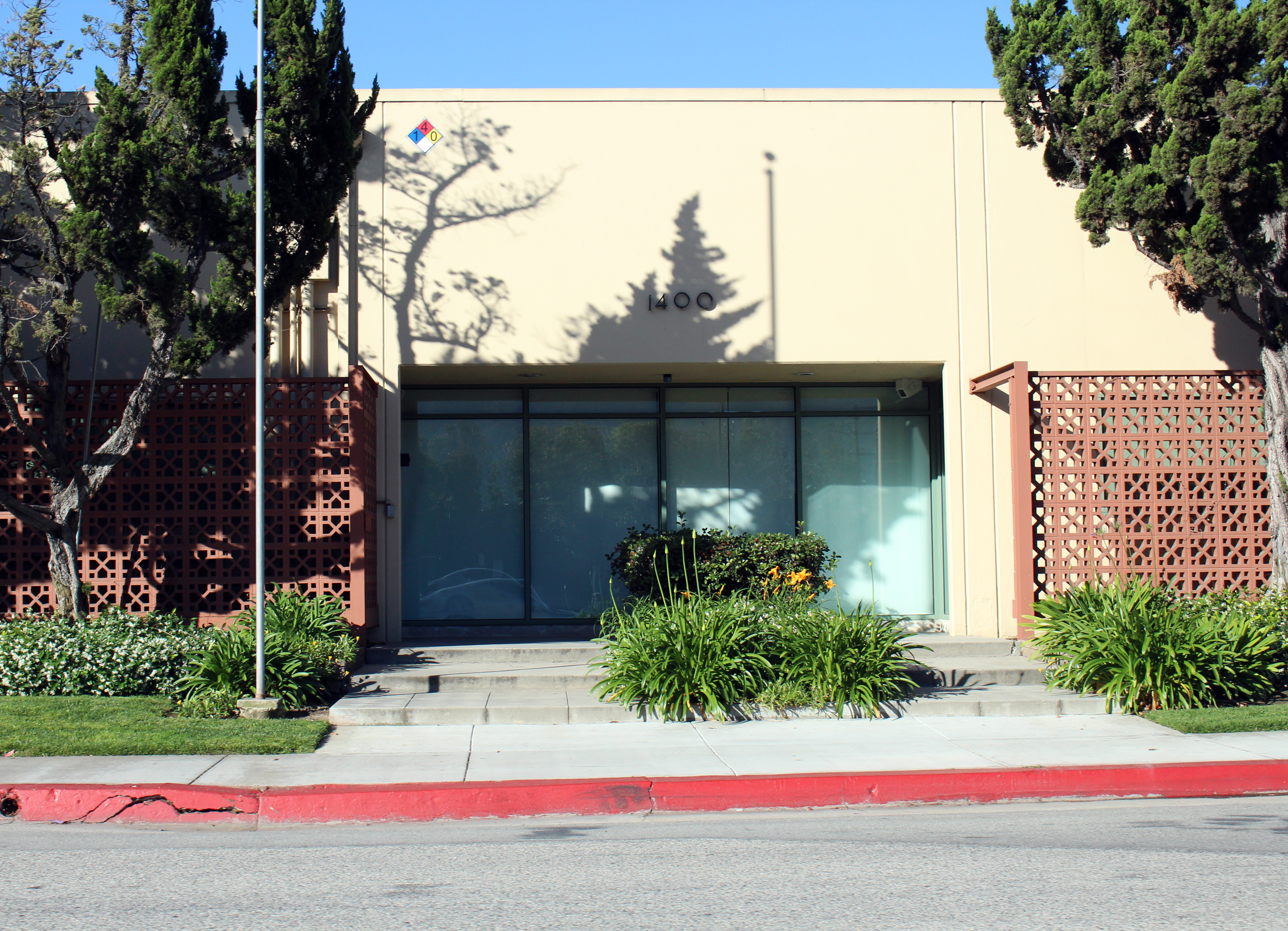
1400 Flower Street in Glendale, where several films immediately predating the Disney Renaissance through Pocahontas were partially produced.

Disney released The Great Mouse Detective (1986) a few months before Don Bluth released An American Tail (1986). An American Tail outperformed The Great Mouse Detective and became the highest-grossing animated film to that date. Still, The Great Mouse Detective's critical and commercial success instilled executive confidence in Disney's animation department. In 1988, Disney released Oliver & Company on the same day as The Land Before Time. While the latter broke An American Tail's record for highest-grossing animated film worldwide, Oliver & Company outgrossed it in the United States, launching an era of increased theatrical turnout for Disney.

In the 1980s, Disney collaborated with filmmaker Steven Spielberg, the producer of An American Tail and The Land Before Time and a long-time animation fan, to produce Who Framed Roger Rabbit (1988), a live-action/animation hybrid that featured animated characters of the 1930s and 1940s from many studios. The film was a critical and commercial success: it was the summer's biggest hit, won three Academy Awards and a Special Achievement Academy Award, and renewed interest in theatrical animated cartoons. Spielberg also helped Disney produce three Roger Rabbit shorts. Disney moved to first place in box-office receipts by 1988.

The Disney Renaissance was prompted by competition with Don Bluth's animated productions, along with the evolution of overseas animation, most notably the Studio Ghibli anime productions from Japanese animator Hayao Miyazaki. Miyazaki's adaptation of the Lupin the Third comics created by Monkey Punch, The Castle of Cagliostro (1979), influenced the climax of The Great Mouse Detective, which in turn paved the way for the Disney Renaissance. The two-minute climax scene used computer-generated imagery (CGI), making it the first Disney film to extensively use computer animation, a fact that Disney used to promote the film during marketing. Glen Keane, a leading animator for Disney films, has also credited Miyazaki's work as a "huge influence" on Disney's animated films.

== Timeline (1989–1999) ==
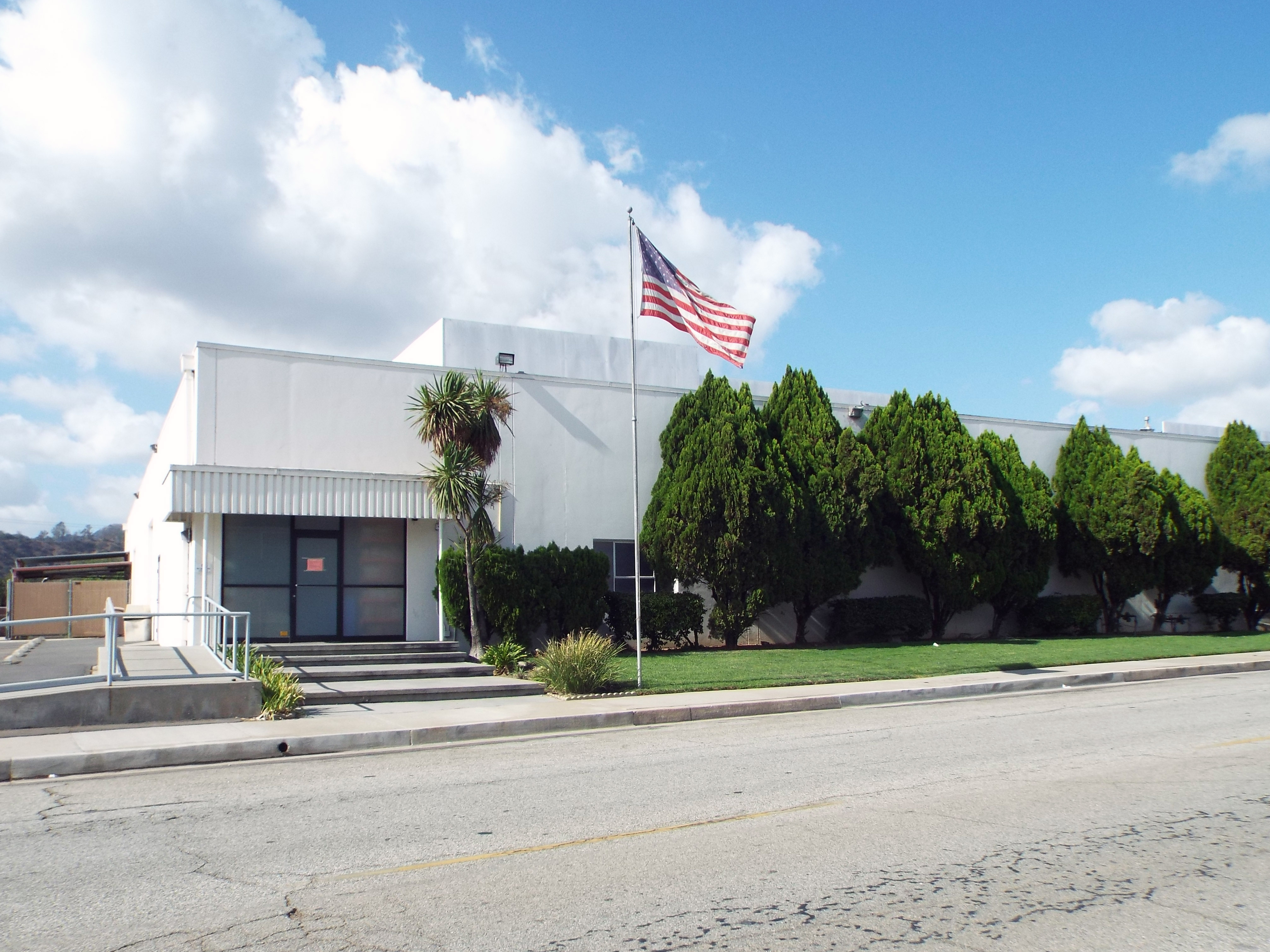
1400 Air Way in Glendale, where several films of the Disney Renaissance were partially produced.

=== 1989: The Little Mermaid ===
Disney had been developing The Little Mermaid (1989) since the 1930s, and by 1988, after the success of Touchstone Pictures' Who Framed Roger Rabbit, the studio had decided to make it into a Broadway-style animated musical. Lyricist Howard Ashman and composer Alan Menken, who worked Off-Broadway years earlier on Little Shop of Horrors alongside now-Walt Disney Feature Animation president Peter Schneider (who served as company manager on the stage musical), became involved in the production, writing and composing the songs and score for the film. Ashman worked to have the songs stitched into the movie, bringing the musical theater tradition into Disney.

Upon release, The Little Mermaid was a critical and commercial success and garnered a higher weekend gross than Don Bluth's All Dogs Go to Heaven (1989), which was released on the same day, eventually breaking The Land Before Time's record of highest-grossing animated film.

It won two Academy Awards for Best Original Song ("Under the Sea") and for Best Original Score, earning an additional nomination for Best Original Song for "Kiss the Girl". It also marked a significant turn by the studio back towards the darker and scarier villains typical of the films it had produced before Walt Disney's death.

=== 1990–1991: The Rescuers Down Under and Beauty and the Beast ===
The Rescuers Down Under (1990) was the first sequel produced by Walt Disney Feature Animation. The film garnered mainly positive reception but was not as financially successful as The Little Mermaid. However, it was notable for being the first film to be completely produced using Disney's new Computer Animation Production System (CAPS). The rest of the traditionally animated films during this period would be produced using CAPS.

Beauty and the Beast (1991) was Disney's next film and proved to be an immense critical and commercial success. It was the first animated film nominated for an Academy Award for Best Picture, remaining the only animated film nominated for Best Picture when that category had only five entries (1944–2008); it won the Golden Globe Award for Best Picture (Musical or Comedy) and two Academy Awards, for Best Original Score and Best Original Song ("Beauty and the Beast"). Beauty and the Beast also received an Academy Award nomination for Best Sound, as well as two additional nominations for Best Original Song. In addition to being Disney's highest-grossing animated movie at the time, it was the first animated film to reach $100 million at the box office in the US. The box office success also gave way to a profitable merchandising campaign. In 1994, it was the first Disney Renaissance film to receive a Broadway adaptation.

=== 1992–1994: Aladdin and The Lion King ===
Aladdin (1992) and The Lion King (1994) followed, respectively, with both films having the highest worldwide grosses of their respective release years. Aladdin was the highest-grossing animated film at the time of its release, but it later became second after being surpassed by The Lion King, which remains the highest-grossing traditionally animated film in history.

Howard Ashman wrote several songs for Aladdin before his death, but only three were ultimately used in the film. Tim Rice ultimately joined the project and completed the score and songs with Alan Menken. Rice later went on to collaborate with Elton John and Hans Zimmer for The Lion King, after ABBA had turned down the offer to write songs for the film. Both films won Academy Awards for Best Original Song ("A Whole New World" and "Can You Feel the Love Tonight") and Best Original Score, and, like Beauty and the Beast, also won the Golden Globe Award for Best Picture (Musical or Comedy). Aladdin also earned an additional Academy Award nomination for Best Original Song and nominations for Best Sound and Best Sound Effects Editing, for a total of five nominations. The Lion King earned two additional Academy Award nominations for Best Original Song, giving it a total of four Academy Award nominations.

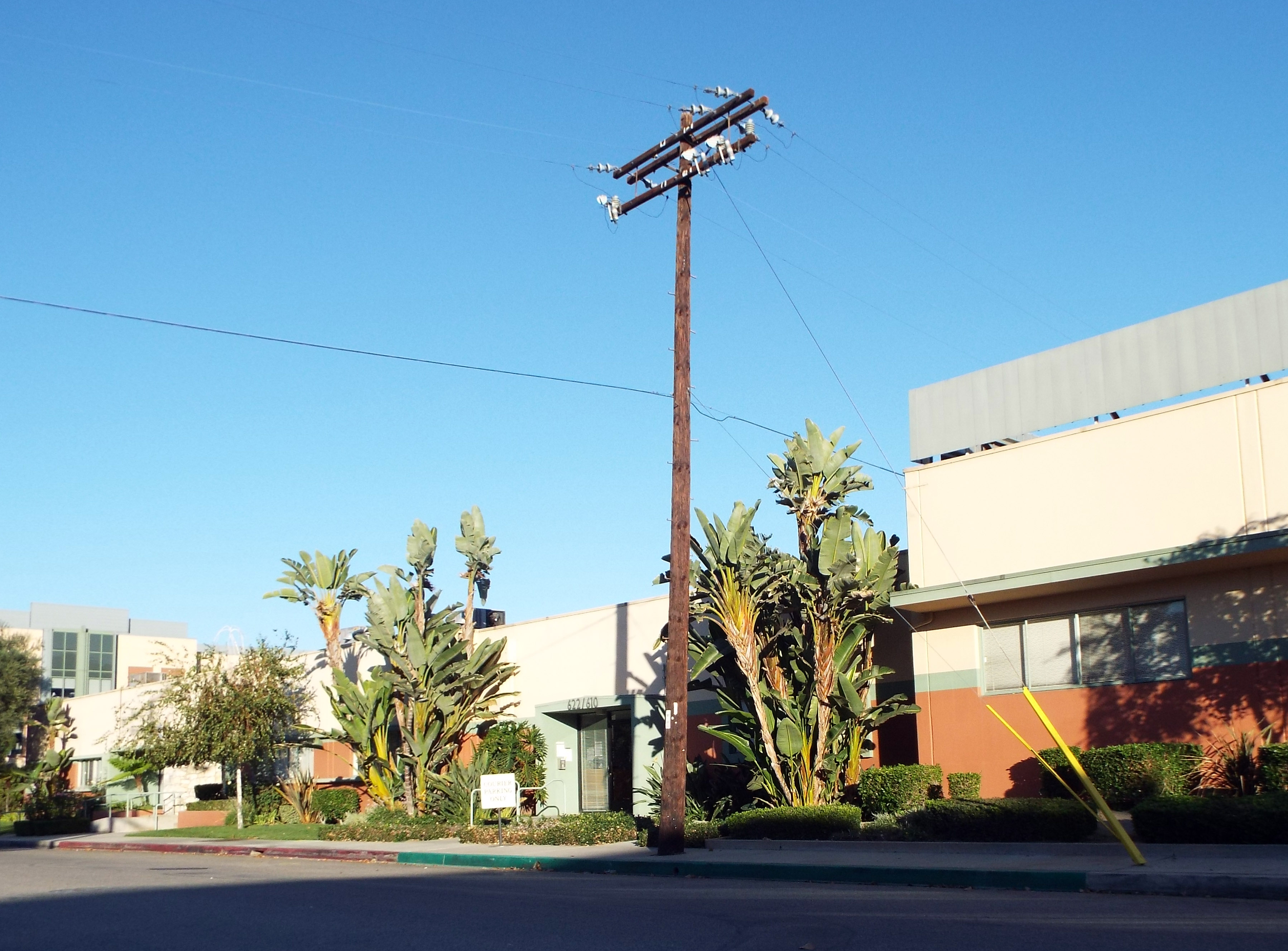
622/610 Circle 7 Drive (the Hart-Dannon Building), where several films of the Disney Renaissance were partially produced.

Between the two in-house productions, Disney diversified in animation methods and produced the stop-motion animated film The Nightmare Before Christmas (1993), written by former Disney animator Tim Burton and directed by also former Disney animator Henry Selick. The film received an Academy Award nomination for Best Visual Effects, becoming the first animated film to do so, losing to Spielberg's 1993 film Jurassic Park. Thanks to the success of the early films of the Renaissance era, Disney management was able to allocate sufficient money to bring Walt Disney Feature Animation back from its ten-year exile to Glendale. A 240,000-square-foot building designed by Robert A. M. Stern opened across the street from the main Disney lot in Burbank on December 16, 1994.

=== 1995–1997: Pocahontas, The Hunchback of Notre Dame, and Hercules ===
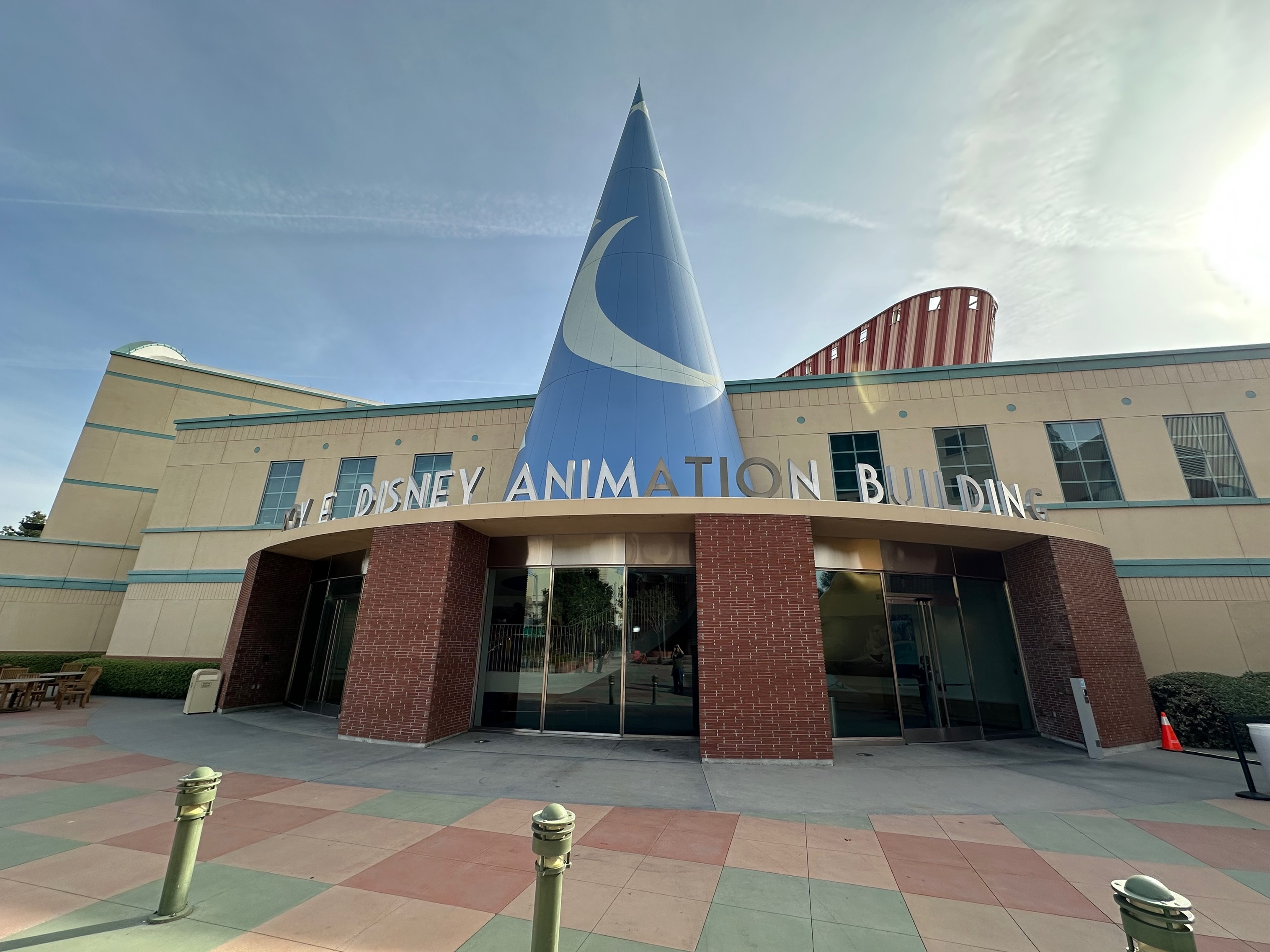
The Roy E. Disney Animation Building, opened in 1995 as the new location for Walt Disney Animation Studios.

The next Disney animated film, Pocahontas (1995), received mixed reviews from film critics., though it still earned $346 million worldwide on a $55 million budget and garnered two Academy Awards for Best Original Musical or Comedy Score and Best Original Song ("Colors of the Wind"). However, its box office gross was far lower in comparison to what The Lion King earned the previous year. The following year, The Hunchback of Notre Dame (1996), Disney's first animated film produced at a budget over $100 million, opened to better reviews than Pocahontas but a lower total box office of $325 million. Both films feature composer (now serving only as lyricist to Menken's music) Stephen Schwartz.

When Hercules (1997), with songs by Menken and David Zippel, earned $252 million—$73 million less than The Hunchback of Notre Dame—at the box office, news media began to openly suggest that Disney animation was on a downward trend of its animated film releases. Although it gained more positive criticism than Pocahontas and The Hunchback of Notre Dame, it was still vulnerable to competition from companies such as DreamWorks Animation and Pixar.

=== 1998–1999: Mulan and Tarzan ===
Disney's penultimate Renaissance film, Mulan (1998), with a score by Jerry Goldsmith and songs by Matthew Wilder and David Zippel, earned $304 million at the worldwide box office, restoring the commercial and critical standing of Disney's output.

The release of Tarzan (1999) is retrospectively seen as the end of the Renaissance era. With a score by Mark Mancina and songs by Phil Collins, Tarzan won an Academy Award for Best Original Song ("You'll Be in My Heart") and became Disney's most commercially successful film since The Lion King, earning $448 million at the box office and widespread positive reviews.

== Production overview ==
Film	U.S. release date	Directed by	Screenplay by	Story by	Produced by	Songs by	Score by
The Little Mermaid	November 17, 1989	John Musker; Ron Clements	John Musker; Ron Clements	John Musker; Ron Clements	Howard Ashman; John Musker	Howard Ashman; Alan Menken	Alan Menken
The Rescuers Down Under	November 16, 1990	Hendel Butoy; Mike Gabriel	Jim Cox; Karey Kirkpatrick; Byron Simpson; Joe Ranft	Jim Cox; Karey Kirkpatrick; Byron Simpson; Joe Ranft	Thomas Schumacher	N/A	Bruce Broughton
Beauty and the Beast	November 22, 1991	Gary Trousdale; Kirk Wise	Linda Woolverton	Brenda Chapman; Chris Sanders; Burny Mattinson; Kevin Harkey; Brian Pimental; Bruce Woodside; Joe Ranft; Tom Ellery; Kelly Asbury; Robert Lence	Don Hahn	Howard Ashman; Alan Menken	Alan Menken
Aladdin	November 25, 1992	John Musker; Ron Clements	Ron Clements; John Musker; Ted Elliott; Terry Rossio	Burny Mattinson; Roger Allers; Daan Jippes; Kevin Harkey; Sue Nichols; Francis Glebas; Darrell Rooney; Larry Leker; James Fujii; Kirk Hanson; Kevin Lima; Rebecca Rees; David S. Smith; Chris Sanders; Brian Pimental; Patrick A. Ventura	John Musker; Ron Clements	Howard Ashman; Alan Menken; Tim Rice	Alan Menken
The Lion King	June 24, 1994	Roger Allers; Rob Minkoff	Irene Mecchi; Jonathan Roberts; Linda Woolverton	Barry Johnson; Andy Gaskill; Kevin Harkey; Tom Sito; Rick Maki; Burny Mattinson; Lorna Cook; Gary Trousdale; Jorgen Klubien; Larry Leker; Ed Gombert; Thom Enriquez; Jim Capobianco; Chris Sanders; Joe Ranft; Francis Glebas	Don Hahn	Tim Rice; Elton John	Hans Zimmer
Pocahontas	June 23, 1995	Mike Gabriel; Eric Goldberg	Carl Binder; Susannah Grant; Philip LaZebnik	Glen Keane; Joe Grant; Burny Mattinson; Ed Gombert; Kaan Kalyon; Francis Glebas; Robert Gibbs; Bruce Morris; Todd Kurosawa; Duncan Marjoribanks; Chris Buck	Jim Penta	Alan Menken; Stephen Schwartz	Alan Menken
The Hunchback of Notre Dame	June 21, 1996	Gary Trousdale; Kirk Wise	Tab Murphy; Irene Mecchi; Bob Tzudiker; Noni White; Jonathan Roberts	Tab Murphy	Don Hahn	Alan Menken; Stephen Schwartz	Alan Menken
Hercules	June 27, 1997	John Musker; Ron Clements	Ron Clements; John Musker; Donald McEnery; Bob Shaw; Irene Mecchi	Kaan Kalyon; Kelly Wightman; Randy Cartwright; John Ramirez; Jeff Snow; Vance Gerry; Kirk Hanson; Francis Glebas; Mark Kennedy; Bruce M. Morris; Don Dougherty; Thom Enriquez	Alice Dewey Goldstone; John Musker; Ron Clements	Alan Menken; David Zippel	Alan Menken
Mulan	June 19, 1998	Barry Cook; Tony Bancroft	Rita Hsiao; Chris Sanders; Philip LaZebnik; Raymond Singer; Eugenia Bostwick-Singer	Robert D. San Souci	Pam Coats	Matthew Wilder; David Zippel	Jerry Goldsmith
Tarzan	June 18, 1999	Kevin Lima; Chris Buck	Tab Murphy; Bob Tzudiker; Noni White	Stephen Anderson; Mark D. Kennedy; Carole Holliday; Gaëtan Brizzi; Paul Brizzi; Don Dougherty; Ed Gombert; Randy Haycock; Don Hall; Kevin L. Harkey; Glen Keane; Burny Mattinson; Frank Nissen; John Norton; Jeff Snow; Michael Surrey; Christopher J. Ure; Mark Walton; Stevie Wermers; Kelly Wightman; John Ramirez	Bonnie Arnold	Phil Collins	Mark Mancina

== Reception ==
=== Critical and public response ===
Most of the films Disney released in the Renaissance era were well received. According to review-aggregation website Rotten Tomatoes, six of the movies—The Little Mermaid, Beauty and the Beast, Aladdin, The Lion King, Mulan, and Tarzan garnered approval ratings of over 85%, with the first four being referred to by Roger Ebert as the "big four" in 1997. Pocahontas has the lowest reception of Disney's Renaissance films, averaging 59% positive reviews.

Film	Directors	Rotten Tomatoes	Metacritic	CinemaScore
The Little Mermaid	John Musker, Ron Clements	92% (8.5/10 average rating) (126 reviews)	88 (24 reviews)	—N/a
The Rescuers Down Under	Hendel Butoy, Mike Gabriel	85% (7.0/10 average rating) (66 reviews)	70 (19 reviews)	—N/a
Beauty and the Beast	Gary Trousdale, Kirk Wise	95% (9.0/10 average rating) (171 reviews)	95 (22 reviews)	A+
Aladdin	John Musker, Ron Clements	96% (8.6/10 average rating) (130 reviews)	86 (25 reviews)	A+
The Lion King	Roger Allers, Rob Minkoff	92% (8.7/10 average rating) (172 reviews)	88 (30 reviews)	A+
Pocahontas	Mike Gabriel, Eric Goldberg	58% (6.6/10 average rating) (116 reviews)	58 (23 reviews)	A−
The Hunchback of Notre Dame	Gary Trousdale, Kirk Wise	80% (7.7/10 average rating) (111 reviews)	74 (28 reviews)	A
Hercules	John Musker, Ron Clements	83% (7.8/10 average rating) (113 reviews)	74 (22 reviews)	A
Mulan	Barry Cook, Tony Bancroft	92% (8.3/10 average rating) (142 reviews)	72 (24 reviews)	A+
Tarzan	Kevin Lima, Chris Buck	90% (8.1/10 average rating) (158 reviews)	80 (27 reviews)	A

=== Box office performance ===
Film	Release date	Revenue			Rank			Budget	Reference
Film	Release date	United States	Foreign	Worldwide	All time domestic	^{(A)}	All time worldwide	Budget	Reference
The Little Mermaid	November 17, 1989	$111,543,479	$99,800,000	$235,343,479	699	364	822	$40,000,000	
The Rescuers Down Under	November 16, 1990	$27,931,461	$19,468,539	$47,400,000	3,166	2,386	3,295	$30,000,000	
Beauty and the Beast	November 22, 1991	$218,967,620	$224,033,956	$443,001,576	231	118	324	$25,000,000	
Aladdin	November 25, 1992	$217,350,219	$286,700,000	$504,150,219	203	67	251	$28,000,000	
The Lion King	June 24, 1994	$422,783,777	$545,700,000	$968,583,777	37	11	57	$45,000,000	
Pocahontas	June 23, 1995	$141,579,773	$204,500,000	$346,179,773	475	238	480	$55,000,000	
The Hunchback of Notre Dame	June 21, 1996	$100,138,851	$225,200,000	$325,338,851	845	486	519	$70,000,000	
Hercules	June 27, 1997	$99,112,101	$153,600,000	$252,712,101	852	520	713	$85,000,000	
Mulan	June 19, 1998	$120,620,254	$183,700,000	$304,320,254	618	379	569	$90,000,000	
Tarzan	June 18, 1999	$171,091,819	$277,100,000	$448,191,819	342	222	313	$130,000,000	
Total		$1,631,119,354	$2,182,353,617	$3,875,321,849					

List indicator

- ^{(A)} indicates the adjusted totals based on current ticket prices (calculated by The Numbers).

* As of 3 April 2025

== Awards ==
The Rescuers Down Under is the only film in the Renaissance era not to have been nominated in both Annie and Oscar ceremonies. Nine of the ten films in the Disney Renaissance were nominated for Academy Awards, six of which won at least one Academy Award; six for Best Original Song and five for Best Original Score, with the first five films winning awards in both categories. The Disney Renaissance is also notable for its film Beauty and the Beast becoming the first animated film ever to be nominated for Best Picture. Eight of the films were nominated for Annie Awards, with seven of the films winning at least one.

Year	Film	Academy Awards		Annie Awards	
Year	Film	Nomination(s)	Win(s)	Nomination(s)	Win(s)
1989	The Little Mermaid	3	2	0	0
1991	Beauty and the Beast	6	2	2	2
1992	Aladdin	5	2	3	1
1994	The Lion King	4	2	3	3
1995	Pocahontas	2	2	7	4
1996	The Hunchback of Notre Dame	1	0	13	0
1997	Hercules	1	0	6	4
1998	Mulan	1	0	12	10
1999	Tarzan	1	1	11	1

== Music ==
=== Soundtracks ===
All soundtracks were initially released under Walt Disney Records in the format of CD and cassette.

List of soundtracks, with selected chart positions and certifications
Title	Release date	Peak chart positions										Certifications	
Title	Release date	US	AUS	AUT	BEL (Vl)	BEL (Wa)	FRA	GER	NL	NZ	SWI	RIAA	MC
The Little Mermaid	October 19, 1989	32	—	—	—	—	—	—	—	—	25	6× Platinum	3× Platinum
Beauty and the Beast	October 24, 1991	19	18	—	—	—	—	—	25	21	—	3× Platinum	Platinum
Aladdin	October 27, 1992	6	15	—	—	—	—	71	—	29	—	3× Platinum	
The Lion King	April 27, 1994	1	3	4	16	5	1	7	6	1	1	Diamond	
Pocahontas	June 1, 1995	1	19	35	32	11	—	79	—	8	36	3× Platinum	4× Platinum
The Hunchback of Notre Dame	May 7, 1996	11	—	—	—	—	12	—	—	—	—	Platinum	
Hercules	May 27, 1997	17	—	—	—	—	28	—	—	—	—	Gold	
Mulan	June 2, 1998	25	—	—	—	—	20	—	—	—	—	Gold	
Tarzan	May 18, 1999	5	40	9	32	28	9	6	51	34	11	2× Platinum	
"—" denotes a recording that did not chart or was not released in that territory.													

=== Singles ===
List of singles, with selected chart positions and certifications, showing year released and soundtrack name
Title	English-language performer(s)	Year	Peak chart positions				Certifications	Album
Title	English-language performer(s)	Year	US	US AC	AUS	UK	Certifications	Album
"Under the Sea"	Samuel E. Wright	1989	—	—	—	—	RIAA: 2× Platinum	The Little Mermaid
"Beauty and the Beast"	Celine Dion & Peabo Bryson	1991	9	3	17	9	RIAA: Gold	Beauty and the Beast
"A Whole New World"	Peabo Bryson & Regina Belle	1992	1	1	10	9	RIAA: Gold	Aladdin
"Can You Feel the Love Tonight"	Elton John	1994	4	1	9	14	RIAA: Platinum	The Lion King
"Circle of Life"	Elton John	1994	18	2	60	11	RIAA: Gold	The Lion King
"Colors of the Wind"	Vanessa Williams	1995	4	2	16	21	RIAA: Gold	Pocahontas
"If I Never Knew You"	Jon Secada & Shanice	1995	108	—	—	51		Pocahontas
"Someday"	All-4-One	1996	30	14	—	—	RIAA: Gold	The Hunchback of Notre Dame
"Someday"	Eternal	1996	—	—	27	4		The Hunchback of Notre Dame
"Go the Distance"	Michael Bolton	1997	24	1	—	14	RIAA: Gold	Hercules
"I Won't Say (I'm in Love)"	Belinda Carlisle	1997	—	—	—	—		Hercules
"True to Your Heart"	98° & Stevie Wonder	1998	—	—	73	51		Mulan
"Reflection"	Christina Aguilera	1998	—	19	—	—		Mulan
"You'll Be in My Heart"	Phil Collins	1999	21	1	43	17	RIAA: 3× Platinum	Tarzan
"Strangers Like Me"	Phil Collins	1999	—	10	—	—	RIAA: Platinum	Tarzan
"Son of Man"	Phil Collins	2000	—	—	—	—	RIAA: Gold	Tarzan
"Two Worlds"	Phil Collins	2000	—	—	—	—	RIAA: Gold	Tarzan
"—" denotes a recording that did not chart or was not released in that territory.

== Industry impact ==
=== Analysis ===
Many have attributed the success of the Disney Renaissance to a collection of key similarities found in most, if not all, of the films from 1989 to 1999. Broadway-style musical numbers were put into place that forwarded the narrative of many of the films. Characters used songs to showcase their internal emotions. Most of the Renaissance films had songs that had the main character singing about what they want out of life as well as chorus numbers led by the supporting cast. Critics have also said that the music style of Renaissance films varies from film to film. An example would be The Little Mermaid having Calypso-style musical numbers and Hercules utilizing Motown in its soundtrack.

The use of CAPS, action sequences, and inclusion of celebrity voice talent is also said to have drawn audiences in. Robin Williams' performance as Genie in Aladdin is the reason why many believe other studios began to cast celebrities as voice actors in their animated films.

Due to Disney never acknowledging an official timeline of films for their Renaissance, it is debated what film should be considered the end of the era. Some consider Dinosaur (2000) for its use of CGI or The Emperor's New Groove (2000) for its comedic tone to be the end of the Renaissance. Given its release in 1999, Fantasia 2000 is included in the lineup of films if either Dinosaur or The Emperor's New Groove is seen as the end of the era. Brandon Zachery of Comic Book Resources states that Tarzan is widely considered to be the finale of the Renaissance, as it was the final film in a row of Disney's that "still adhered to many of the era's standard traits, including multiple songs, cutting-edge visuals, and celebrity cameos in small roles."

=== Impact on other studios ===
The success of the Disney Renaissance attracted the attention of many animation studios and film studios. Major film studios established new animation divisions, such as Fox Animation Studios, Warner Bros. Feature Animation, and DreamWorks Animation, to replicate Disney's success by turning their animated films into Disney-styled musicals. Examples of said musicals include Cats Don't Dance (1997), Anastasia (1997), Quest for Camelot (1998), and The Prince of Egypt (1998).

=== Sequels ===
Disney MovieToons, later known as Disneytoon Studios, was established by Disney to produce direct-to-video sequels to many of the Renaissance films, utilizing the crew of their television animation studios. The Return of Jafar (1994), a sequel to Aladdin, was the first film to be released. Further sequels to Renaissance films include Aladdin and the King of Thieves (1996), Beauty and the Beast: The Enchanted Christmas (1997), Pocahontas II: Journey to a New World (1998), The Lion King II: Simba's Pride (1998), The Little Mermaid II: Return to the Sea (2000), The Hunchback of Notre Dame II (2002), Tarzan & Jane (2002), Mulan II (2004), and Tarzan II (2005).

== Post-renaissance ==
=== Revival era (2009–2019) ===
Audiences have hailed Walt Disney Animation Studios' theatrical film releases from 2009 (The Princess and the Frog) to 2019 (Frozen 2) as a return to form, referring to this era in Disney history as a "Disney Revival" or a new Disney Renaissance. Most films in the Revival use computer animation to tell stories set in fantastical settings while incorporating the Renaissance's Broadway musical style. Several crew members from the Renaissance returned to help create Revival-era films. Ron Clements and John Musker returned to direct The Princess and the Frog (2009) and Moana (2016). Alan Menken scored Tangled (2010) and was a composer for songs for Ralph Breaks the Internet (2018).

The Revival era was the most profitable period in Disney animation history. Frozen (2013), for instance, grossed over $1.2 billion worldwide. The film held the title of highest-grossing animated film, fifth-highest-grossing film of all time, and Walt Disney Studios' second highest-grossing film (behind The Avengers) in 2013. Frozen also was Walt Disney Animation Studios' first feature-length motion picture to win an Academy Award since Tarzan.

The post-"Revival" era generally began with the release of Raya and the Last Dragon (2021) and has been met with less financial success, with the exception of Encanto (2021), Moana 2 (2024) and Zootopia 2 (2025). Some people believe that the post-"Revival" began with the release of Ralph Breaks the Internet (2018), largely defining the new era with an increased focus on franchise sequels and a perceived decline in quality, with only Ralph Breaks the Internet, Frozen 2 (2019), Encanto, and Zootopia 2 receiving overall positive critical reception. Critical response has been attributed to the COVID-19 pandemic, budgetary problems, and poor word of mouth, with films such as Strange World (2022) and Wish (2023) being box-office bombs.

=== Remakes ===
Beauty and the Beast, directed by Bill Condon, was released on March 17, 2017, as the first live-action adaptation of the Disney Renaissance. Alan Menken returned for writing a new score and new songs with Tim Rice. The film grossed over $1.2 billion worldwide, becoming the highest-grossing live-action musical film, second-highest-grossing film of 2017, and the tenth-highest-grossing film of all time. Beauty and the Beast received positive reviews from critics, with many praising its faithfulness to the original animated film, the elements used from the Broadway musical, performances, visual style, musical score, songs, costume design, and production values, though criticism was drawn toward its character designs, the auto-tuning of the singing voices, and the inclusion of new Menken songs that deviated in tone from his previous creative zenith.

Aladdin, directed and co-written by Guy Ritchie, is the second live-action Disney Renaissance adaptation theatrically released in the United States on May 24, 2019. Alan Menken returned again to write new music and songs with Benj Pasek and Justin Paul. It grossed $1 billion worldwide, becoming the ninth-highest-grossing film of 2019. The film received mixed reviews from critics, with praise for its music, costume design, and the performances of actors but criticism for Ritchie's direction and the screenplay.

The third Disney Renaissance remake was The Lion King, directed and produced by Jon Favreau. It was theatrically released in the United States on July 19, 2019. Hans Zimmer returned as composer, and Elton John and Tim Rice returned to write new songs with Beyoncé. It grossed over $1.6 billion worldwide, becoming the highest-grossing animated film of all time, the highest-grossing musical film of all time, the highest-grossing remake of all time, the highest-grossing Walt Disney Pictures film of all time, the second-highest-grossing film of 2019, and the seventh highest-grossing film of all time. The film received mixed reviews from critics, with praise for its visual effects, music, and vocal performances, but criticism for its lack of originality and facial emotion on the characters.

Disney's fourth live-action adaptation, Mulan, was released on September 4, 2020. It was directed by Niki Caro, with Harry Gregson-Williams acting as the new composer and songwriter for the film. The film was originally scheduled to be a wide theatrical release in March 2020 but was ultimately cancelled in the United States after being delayed multiple times due to the COVID-19 pandemic. Disney instead premiered the film on September 4, 2020, on Disney+, for a premium fee in countries where the service had launched. The film had a traditional theatrical release in countries without Disney+ where theaters had reopened. With a production budget of $200 million, the film was a financial disappointment, grossing only $70 million, not including digital earnings from Disney+. The film received generally positive reviews from Western critics, who praised the action sequences, visuals, and performances but criticized the screenplay. It received unfavorable reviews from Chinese audiences, who criticized the character development, inaccurate depictions of Chinese history, and mishandling of Chinese cultural elements.

The fifth live-action adaptation, The Little Mermaid, was released on May 26, 2023 (directed and produced by Rob Marshall). Alan Menken also returned as the film's composer and wrote new songs alongside producer Lin-Manuel Miranda. The Little Mermaid grossed $298.2 million in the United States and Canada, and $271.4 million in other territories, for a worldwide gross of $569.6 million. Critics praised the performances of the cast and the musical sequences but criticized the visual effects and character designs. Vanessa Armstrong of /Film called it a live-action remake "done well" that "improves on the original" and had no doubt that "it will become an indelible part of many a young person's childhood, and I can't wait to watch it with my daughter." Ann Hornaday of The Washington Post called it an "on-the-other-fin mixed bag of a movie that honors its source material with a big, color-saturated production, while never precisely proving that it ever needed to exist."

A live-action adaptation of Hercules is currently in development, with Guy Ritchie to direct it.

=== Video games ===
With the exception of The Rescuers Down Under, the Disney Renaissance films had video game releases during the 1990s: The Little Mermaid (1991), Aladdin (1993), Beauty and the Beast (1994), The Lion King (1994), Pocahontas (1996), The Hunchback of Notre Dame: Topsy Turvy Games (1996), Hercules (1997), Mulan (1998), and Tarzan (1999).

== See also ==
- Waking Sleeping Beauty – 2009 documentary film chronicling the beginning and success of the Disney Renaissance from 1984 to 1994.
- Kunze, Peter C. Staging a Comeback: Broadway, Hollywood, and the Disney Renaissance. New Brunswick, NJ: Rutgers University Press, 2023.
