= Tarzan (musical) =

2006 musical by Phil Collins

- Poster for the original Broadway run.
- Music: Phil Collins
- Lyrics: Phil Collins
- Book: David Henry Hwang
- Setting: West African Jungle
- Basis: Tarzan by Tab Murphy; Bob Tzudiker; Noni White; Tarzan of the Apes by Edgar Rice Burroughs
- Productions: 2006 Broadway; 2007 The Hague; 2008 Hamburg; 2013 Stuttgart; 2016 Oberhausen; 2023 Stuttgart; 2025 Hamburg; 2025 Tokyo

Tarzan is a musical based on the Walt Disney Animation Studios 1999 film of the same name, with music and lyrics by Phil Collins, and a book by David Henry Hwang. The musical follows Tarzan, who is raised by gorillas in West Africa. He meets Jane, a young English naturalist, and falls in love, unknowing that Jane's entourage plans to kill the gorillas.

The original Broadway production opened in 2006, directed and designed by Bob Crowley with choreography by Meryl Tankard. The production ran for 35 previews and 486 performances. Subsequently, the show has been staged in several other countries and by regional theatres.

== Background ==
A workshop was held in 2004, with Daniel Manche as the Child Tarzan, Matthew Morrison as the Adult Tarzan, Adam Pascal as Tarzan Storyteller and Laura Bell Bundy as Jane. Pascal's part was cut from the production when it opened on Broadway. The original production began previews on Broadway on March 24, 2006, and officially opened at the Richard Rodgers Theatre on May 10. Danton Burroughs, grandson of Edgar Rice Burroughs, attended the opening night party, as did Phil Collins. The production was nominated for a Tony Award for Best Lighting Design of a Musical.

The musical follows the plot of the Disney film, with a few minor changes. Some alterations include the female gorilla Terk being changed to male for the musical, while Tantor the elephant is absent completely.

== Plot ==
=== Act 1 ===
Off the West African coast, a young English couple and their newborn son barely survive a shipwreck and land in Africa. They construct a tree house for their son before being killed by a leopard named Sabor. In the African Jungle, Kerchak, the leader of a tribe of gorillas admires his new infant son with his mate, Kala ("Two Worlds"). Sabor suddenly appears and kidnaps the newborn baby gorilla. Kala goes off to find her son but finds the human boy instead and names him Tarzan. She mothers him and raises him despite Kerchak's refusal to treat Tarzan as his son ("You'll Be In My Heart").

As a young child, Tarzan finds that he cannot keep up with the tribe, while Kerchak views him as a threat. Despite this, Tarzan is befriended by the lighthearted Terk, a young gorilla who teaches him the ways of the gorillas ("Who Better Than Me"). However, Kerchak finds Tarzan constructing a spear, and assuming he intends to hurt the gorillas, he holds Kala accountable ("No Other Way"). Kala worries for him and goes off to find him. She discovers him despairing by the water's edge ("I Need To Know"). Kala tells him that even though they look different, underneath the skin, they are just the same, reigniting Tarzan's desire to become the best ape ever.

Years pass, and Tarzan grows into a young man, athletic and resourceful ("Son of Man"), accepted by many of the gorillas as one of their own, except for Kerchak. Kala tries to convince Kerchak to accept Tarzan ("Sure As Sun Turns To Moon"). Kerchak won't change his mind until Tarzan kills Sabor to avenge his parents and prevent him from terrorizing the tribe any longer. Suddenly, gunshots are heard throughout the jungle, causing the tribe to scatter while Tarzan investigates what scared them away. Deep in the jungle, Jane Porter, a young English naturalist, is overwhelmed by the thrillingly diverse jungle life ("Waiting For This Moment"). While exploring, she is attacked by a giant spider but is rescued by Tarzan. Tarzan and Jane carefully assess each other as they realize their similar qualities ("Different").

=== Act 2 ===
At the Porter expedition site, Terk and the other gorillas discover the site and all of its unique features, and do some redecorating ("Trashin' The Camp"). Jane returns to the site with Tarzan, and she is thrilled by the tribe of gorillas. Kerchak arrives and scares the gorillas off. Jane tries to convince her father, Professor Porter, and their guide, Clayton, that she discovered a wild man and a tribe of apes. Kerchak forbids contact with the humans, but Tarzan and Jane grow to love each other and Jane tells her father more about the wild ape man ("Like No Man I've Ever Seen"). Tarzan soon visits the humans and becomes properly acquainted with them, especially Jane, though Clayton becomes jealous of their love.

Jane tries to teach Tarzan more about humans and human life, while Tarzan shows her his jungle world, too ("Strangers Like Me"); all the while, Jane tries to cope with her emotions ("For The First Time"). She tries to tell her father to stop Clayton's plans of killing the gorillas, but Clayton, wanting to achieve his goal, tricks Tarzan into taking the humans to the gorilla nesting grounds. Tarzan asks Terk to help him by keeping Kerchak away, and Terk agrees ("Who Better Than Me (Reprise)"). As Tarzan shows the humans his gorilla family, Kerchak arrives anyway, scattering the humans and demanding that Tarzan choose who he is. Realizing her son is torn between his loyalty to his gorilla family and his need to be with humans, Kala shows Tarzan the treehouse his parents built and he discovers all of their belongings ("Everything That I Am"). He decides to go to England with Jane and live as a human and he tells Kala his decision ("You'll Be In My Heart (Reprise)").

Tarzan approaches Jane and Porter, announcing his intention to leave the jungle and be with Jane. At the same time, however, Clayton seizes the opportunity to capture the gorillas once and for all, and manages to shoot Kerchak, fatally wounding the gorilla leader. Tarzan rushes back at the sound of the gunshot and fights Clayton, nearly killing him until Porter convinces him to spare his life so they can handle Clayton in a less violent way; Clayton is soon arrested and sent back to the ship to await punishment back in England for his actions. Tarzan rushes to Kerchak, but he has already died from his wounds, and Kala and Tarzan mourn for Kerchak's demise ("Sure As Sun Turns To Moon (Reprise)").

At the beach, Jane and Porter are about to leave on their ship to return to England, until Jane realizes that she loves Tarzan and, with Porter's blessing, decides to stay with him in the jungle. Tarzan, having become the new leader of the gorillas, arrives to say goodbye to them, until Jane returns, and they share a kiss. Tarzan and Jane swing off towards their new home, planning to spend the rest of their lives together ("Two Worlds (Reprise)").

== Notable casts ==
Characters	Original Broadway Cast 2006	The Hague 2007	Hamburg 2008	Stuttgart 2013	Oberhausen 2016	Stuttgart 2023	Hamburg 2025
Tarzan	Josh Strickland	Ron Link	Anton Zetterholm Alexander Klaws	Gian Marco Schiaretti	Alexander Klaws	Terence van der Loo	Philipp Büttner
Jane Porter	Jennifer Gambatese	Chantal Janzen	Elisabeth Hübert	Merle Hoch	Tessa Sunniva van Tol	Vajèn van den Bosch	Abla Aloui
Kerchak	Shuler Hensley	Jeroen Phaff	Andreas Lichtenberger	Andreas Lichtenberger	Patrick Stanke	Dániel Rákász	Dániel Rákász
Kala	Merle Dandridge	Chaira Borderslee	Ana Milva Gomes	Melanie Ortner	Sabrina Weckerlin	Sidonie Smith	Kerry Jean
Terk	Chester Gregory II	Clayton Peroti	Rommel Singson	Emanuele Caserta	Massimiliano Pironti	Elindo Avastia	Elindo Avastia
Professor Porter	Tim Jerome	Hans Ligtvoet	Japheth Myers	Japheth Myers	Japheth Myers	Jonas	Paulus
Clayton	Donnie Keshawarz	Léon Roeven	Rudi Reschke	Rudi Reschke	Patrick Imhof	Ludo van der Winkel	Luciano Mercoli
Young Tarzan	Daniel Manche Alex Rutherford	Ellena Geibel	Jannik Semmelhaack	Matthis Lernhart	Julian Cremer	Tino	Jasper

=== Broadway Cast Replacements ===
- Young Tarzan: Dylan Riley Snyder, J. Bradley Bowers
- Kerchak: Rob Evan

== Musical numbers ==
Phil Collins, who wrote five songs for the 1999 film, wrote nine new songs for the stage version.

Act I

- "Two Worlds" – Tarzan, Mother, Father, Kala, Kerchak, and Ensemble
- "You'll Be In My Heart" – Kala and Ensemble
- "Jungle Funk" – Ensemble
- "Who Better Than Me?" – Young Tarzan and Terk
- "No Other Way" – Kerchak
- "I Need to Know" – Young Tarzan
- "Son of Man" – Terk, Kala, Tarzan, and Ensemble
- "Son of Man (Reprise)" – Terk and Ensemble
- "Sure As Sun Turns to Moon" – Kala and Kerchak
- "Waiting for This Moment" – Jane and Ensemble
- "Different (Part 1 & 2)" – Tarzan and Jane

Act II

- "Trashin' the Camp" – Terk and Ensemble
- "Like No Man I've Ever Seen" – Jane and Professor Porter
- "Strangers Like Me" – Tarzan, Jane, and Ensemble
- "For the First Time" – Jane and Tarzan
- "Who Better Than Me? (Reprise)" – Terk and Tarzan
- "Everything That I Am" – Tarzan, Kala, Young Tarzan, and Ensemble
- "You'll Be In My Heart (Reprise)" – Tarzan and Kala
- "Sure As Sun Turns to Moon (Reprise)" – Kala and Tarzan
- "Two Worlds (Finale)" – Tarzan, Jane, and Ensemble

== Original cast recording ==
The Broadway cast album, entitled Tarzan: The Broadway Musical – Original Broadway Cast Recording, was released on June 27, 2006, produced by Mark Mancina. Allmusic explains: "Phil Collins, who wrote music and lyrics for the five songs in the 1999 Tarzan movie, wrote an additional nine for the Broadway show". Phil Collins sings a bonus track "Everything That I Am" at the end of the album. The album includes "all four of the 'old' Tarzan songs (Two Worlds, You'll Be In My Heart, Son Of Man and Strangers Like Me)". The album entered the Billboard Cast Album chart at No. 3.

Allmusic gave the album a rating of 3 out of 5 stars, stating: "Collins seems to understand that theater lyrics, perhaps even more than pop-song lyrics, need to be concise to get dramatic points across quickly and clearly. What he doesn't seem to realize is that that doesn't mean they should be little more than a string of platitudes, clichés, and contemporary slang. ... It's a shame; his words are as bad as his music is good". The review notes that much of the cast perform the songs as Adult Contemporary numbers as opposed to Broadway songs, and concludes by saying that "as a musical work Tarzan represents a lost opportunity to make a good pop musical." Genesis.com notes that rather than being a strict Collins album, "it is a concept album with music that has to work within the parameters of a Broadway musical".

== Productions ==
=== Original Broadway Production ===
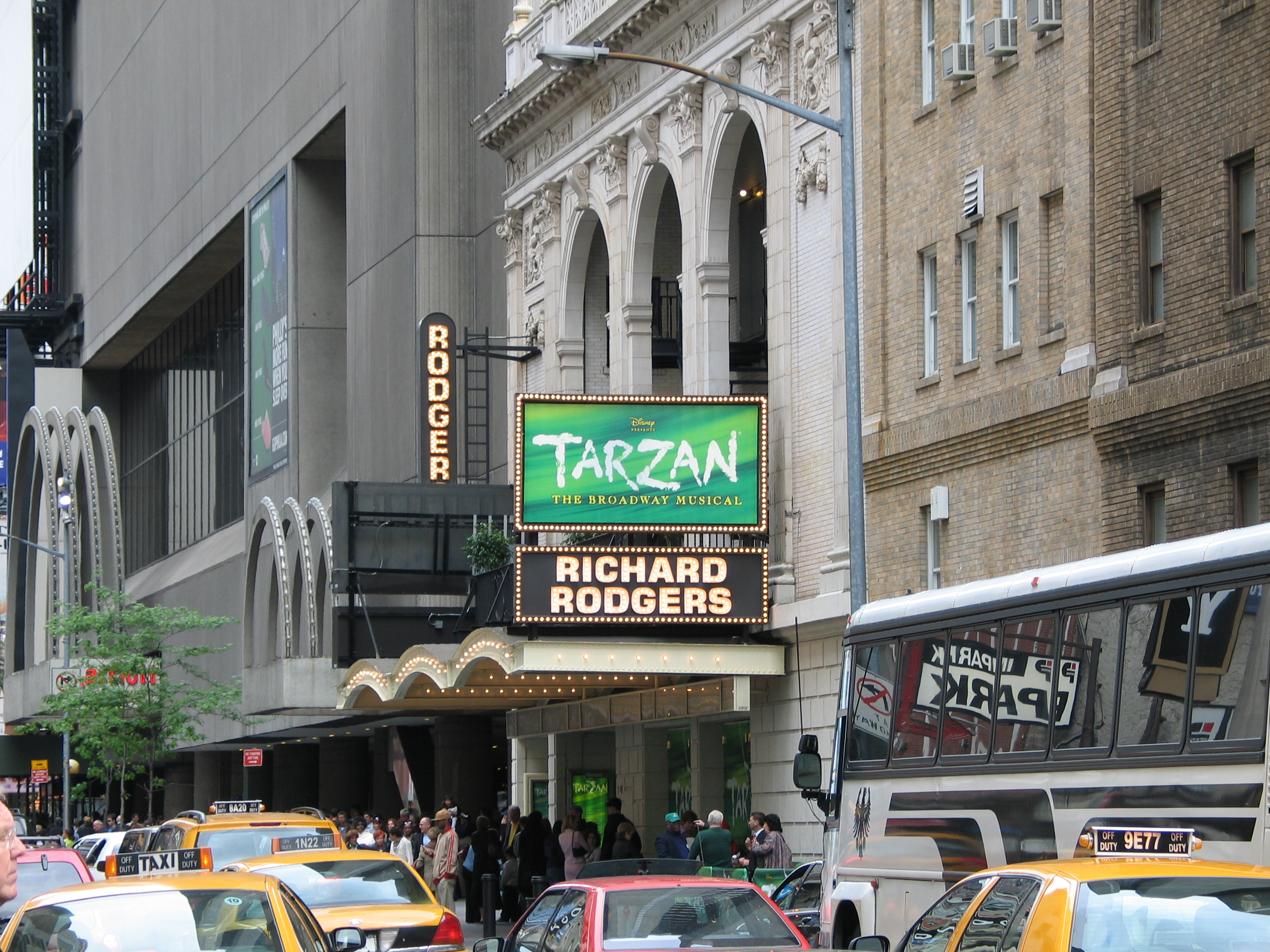
Richard Rodgers Theatre on Broadway

Tarzan opened on Broadway at the Richard Rodgers Theatre on May 10, 2006, after starting previews on March 24, making it the only Disney Theatrical production without an out-of-town tryout. It closed on July 8, 2007, after 35 previews and 486 performances due to poor ticket sales. The production was directed by Bob Crowley and was choreographed was by Meryl Tankard. The show featured aerial design by Pichón Baldinu, scenic and costume design by Crowley, and lighting design by Natasha Katz. The cast starred Josh Strickland as Tarzan, Jennifer Gambatese as Jane Porter, Shuler Hensley as Kerchak, Merle Dandridge as Kala, Chester Gregory II as Terk, Tim Jerome as Professor Porter, and Donnie Keshawarz as Clayton. The production received mixed reviews and a Tony Award nomination for Best Lighting Design.

Dylan Riley Snyder replaced Daniel Manche as first alternate Young Tarzan on September 15, 2006. Rob Evan replaced Shuler Hensley as Kerchak on March 28, 2007. J. Bradley Bowers was cast as Young Tarzan in March 2007 to replace Alex Rutherford. However, it was later announced that the show would close on July 8, 2007, so Bowers, Rutherford, and Snyder alternated in the role of Young Tarzan for the remainder of the show.

=== International Productions ===
The first international production of the show opened on April 15, 2007, at the Fortis Circustheater in Scheveningen, Netherlands and was produced by Disney and Joop van den Ende Theaterproducties/Stage Entertainment. Phil Collins was present at the opening night. The original cast featured Ron Link as Tarzan (winner of the show "Wie Wordt Tarzan?") and Chantal Janzen as Jane. On May 24, 2009, the show closed to make way for the Dutch production of Mary Poppins.

The second international production, and the first independent production (not to be produced by Disney) opened in Kristianstad, Sweden, on February 16, 2008, and closed in 2009. A Philippine production of the show, licensed by Viva Atlantic Theatricals, ran from June 14 – July 7, 2013, at the Meralco Theater in Manila. It starred Dan Domenech as Tarzan and Rachelle Ann Go as Jane. An Australian production of the show, produced by James Terry Collective, ran from August 29 – September 14, 2025 in Melbourne, and saw Joshua Russell and Emily Robinson play the leads Tarzan and Jane Porter.

=== Germany Productions (2008–2018) ===
The third international production opened in Hamburg, Germany, at the Neue Flora Theater on October 19, 2008, and was produced by Disney and Stage Entertainment. It originally starred Anton Zetterholm and Elisabeth Hübert, who won the roles of Tarzan and Jane on the German casting show Ich Tarzan, Du Jane. From May 2010, Alexander Klaws took over the role of Tarzan and played for three years until June 2, 2013. With over three million visitors, the musical became the second most successful musical for Stage Entertainment in Hamburg. The Hamburg production ran for five years and closed in 2013.

The Production moved to Stuttgart after closing in Hamburg, where it opened in November 2013 in the Stage Apollo Theater. Tarzan was played by Gian Marco Schiaretti and Jane by Merle Hoch, both of whom already played these roles in Hamburg. The Production closed after over 2½ years in August 2016.

In November 2016 the musical opened in Oberhausen with a revised stage set. There it played a bit under 2 years, closing on September 23, 2018. In the first six months the title role played again Alexander Klaws, later Josh Strickland, he played Tarzan in the original broadway run. Strickland reprised his role as from May to July 2017, he was then replaced for three months by Anton Zetterholm. In 2018 the musical celebrated 10 years of production in Germany. In 2018 for the third time in a row, the musical was voted most popular long run musical in the German Language by musical1 readers. A German recording of the musical performed by the Hamburg cast was released in 2008.

=== U.S. regional productions ===
The Tuacahn Center for the Arts in Ivins, Utah, presented the regional premiere from June 7 – October 15, 2010, playing three shows a week. The theatre was the first equity theatre to produce the musical after the Broadway production. The show starred James Royce Edwards as Tarzan and Summer Broyhill as Jane.

The Muny of St. Louis, Missouri presented the show from June 25, 2014, through July 2, 2014. Nicholas Rodriguez starred in the title role with Kate Rockwell as Jane. Other cast members included Quentin Earl Darrington as Kerchak, Katie Thompson as Kala, Gregory Haney as Terk, Ken Page as Porter, Michael James Reed as Clayton, Spencer Jones as Young Tarzan and Nathaniel Mahone as Young Terk.

=== Germany rerun (2023–2026) ===
After its huge previous success in Germany, where the musical already ran for nearly ten years in different locations, Stage Entertainment announced on September 20, 2022, that they would once again produce Tarzan in their German theatres. The Premiere was held in Stuttgart on November 18, 2023, approximately 5 years after its last performance in Germany, where it will run in the Stage Palladium Theater, adjacent to the Stage Apollo Theater where it previously ran between 2013 and 2016. On November 20, 2025, the production transferred to the Stage Theater Neue Flora in Hamburg, where it originally premiered back in 2008. The show will close on October 25, 2026.

== Critical reception ==
The show received mixed reviews. A review of the North Show Music Theatre production said the show took "a serious look at the deepest human emotions, setting its story to Collins' vibrant score", and added that "this is a show that holds you and doesn't let go." The New York Times described Tarzan as "insistently kinetic ... fidgety and attention-deficient", noting that though "momentous events occur regularly ... any tension or excitement is routinely sabotaged by overkill and diffuseness". It notes that despite "much money ... and international research" being invested into the show, "we now have conclusive evidence that the Disneyfied Tarzan does indeed flatten perversely when translated from two dimensions into three." Kerry Lengel of The Republic said "the heart of Tarzan's' darkness is Phil Collins' bland melodies and generic lyrics, which offer such character insights as, 'My heart is beating faster, I must know more about her. ... She makes me feel so alive'. Even for a kiddie musical, that's a pretty weak effort."

== Awards and nominations ==
=== Broadway Production ===
Year	Award	Category	Nominee	Result
2006	Tony Awards	Best Lighting Design in a Musical	Natasha Katz	Nominated

=== Netherlands Production ===
Year	Award	Category	Nominee	Result
2007	John Kraaijkamp Musical Awards	Beste grote musical (Best Full-Length Musical)		Won
2007	John Kraaijkamp Musical Awards	Beste vrouwelijke hoofdrol in een grote musical (Best Female Lead in a Full-Length Musical)	Chantal Janzen	Nominated
2007	John Kraaijkamp Musical Awards	Beste Mannelijke Bijrol in een Grote Musical (Best Supporting Actor in a Full-Length Musical)	Clayton Peroti	Won
2007	John Kraaijkamp Musical Awards	Beste Creatieve Prestatie (Best Creative Achievement)	Sergio Trujillo	Nominated
2007	John Kraaijkamp Musical Awards	Beste Inhoudelijke Prestatie (Best Content)	Martine Bijl (translator)	Nominated
2007	John Kraaijkamp Musical Awards	Beste Inhoudelijke Prestatie (Best Content)	Phil Collins	Nominated
2007	John Kraaijkamp Musical Awards	Beste Ontwerper (Best Designer)	Pichón Baldinu	Nominated
2007	John Kraaijkamp Musical Awards	Beste Ontwerper (Best Designer)	Bob Crowley	Nominated
2007	John Kraaijkamp Musical Awards	Nashuatec Musical Award voor Aanstormend Talent (Musical Award for Breakthrough Talent)	Abdul Kassar	Won
