= Tarzan (1999 soundtrack) =

Tarzan: An Original Walt Disney Records Soundtrack

Soundtrack album by Phil Collins, Mark Mancina and various artists
- Released: May 18, 1999
- Recorded: 1998–1999
- Studios: Conway Recording (Hollywood); Capitol (Hollywood); Image Recording (Los Angeles); Mancina Music (Los Angeles); Todd-AO Scoring Stage (Los Angeles); The Village Recorder (Los Angeles); Signet Sound (Los Angeles); Sony Scoring Stage (Culver City); Sony Music (New York City)
- Genres: Worldbeat; pop rock; musical theatre
- Length: 40:55
- Label: Walt Disney
- Producers: Phil Collins; Mark Mancina; Rob Cavallo

Phil Collins chronology
...Hits (1998)	Tarzan (1999)	Testify (2002)

Singles from Tarzan: An Original Walt Disney Records Soundtrack
- 1. "You'll Be in My Heart" Released: May 19, 1999; 2. "Two Worlds" Released: August 25, 1999; 3. "Strangers Like Me" Released: October 25, 1999; 4. "Son of Man" Released: February 8, 2000

Professional ratings
Review scores
Source	Rating
AllMusic	3/5 stars
Filmtracks	4/5 stars
Sputnikmusic	4.5/5

Tarzan: An Original Walt Disney Records Soundtrack is the soundtrack for the 1999 Disney animated feature film Tarzan. The songs on the soundtrack were composed by Phil Collins and the instrumental score was composed by Mark Mancina. The song "You'll Be in My Heart" won both the Academy Award for Best Original Song and the Golden Globe Award for Best Original Song and received a Grammy Award nomination for Best Song Written for a Motion Picture, Television or Other Visual Media, while the soundtrack album won a Grammy Award for Best Soundtrack Album. For his contribution to the soundtrack, Collins received an American Music Award for Favorite Adult Contemporary Artist.

Tarzan was the first Disney soundtrack to be recorded in multiple languages for different markets with Phil Collins also recording French, German, Italian and Spanish versions of the soundtrack, and he was assisted by composer Éric Serra to record and produce the French versions of the songs.

== Commercial performance ==
The Tarzan soundtrack was released by Walt Disney Records on May 18, 1999. The soundtrack peaked at #5 on the Billboard 200 during the week of July 10, 1999, coinciding with the film's theatrical run. The album was a major comeback for Phil Collins, and put him back in the public eye. In the U.S. it reached double platinum status, becoming his best-selling album of new material in a decade.

A promotion was held at the Disney Store. Customers who bought the soundtrack received a free and exclusive single of "You'll Be in My Heart". The soundtrack itself was labeled limited edition, including a holographic cover and an individual collector's number.

The album has sold 2,586,000 copies in the U.S. as of April 2014.

== Track listing ==
All songs written and composed by Phil Collins, with score composed by Mark Mancina.

No.	Title	Performer(s)	Length
1.	"Two Worlds"	Phil Collins	3:18
2.	"You'll Be in My Heart"	Glenn Close and Collins	1:36
3.	"Son of Man"	Collins	2:44
4.	"Trashin' the Camp"	Rosie O'Donnell and Collins	2:16
5.	"Strangers Like Me"	Collins	3:00
6.	"Two Worlds" (Reprise)	Collins	0:51
7.	"Trashin' the Camp"	Collins and NSYNC	2:23
8.	"You'll Be in My Heart" (end credits)	Collins	4:18
9.	"Two Worlds" (Radio version)	Collins	2:42
10.	"A Wondrous Place" (Score)		5:18
11.	"Moves Like an Ape, Looks Like a Man" (Score)		2:57
12.	"The Gorillas" (Score)		4:28
13.	"One Family" (Score)		3:48
14.	"Two Worlds" (Finale)	Collins	1:16
Total length:			40:55

== Personnel ==
Song Tracks (1–9 & 14)

- Phil Collins – vocals (1–3, 5–9, 14), all instruments except where noted (1, 3, 5, 6, 8, 9, 14), arrangements (1, 3–6, 9, 14), noises (4)
- Marc Mann – synthesizer programming (7)
- Jamie Muhoberac – acoustic piano (8), keyboards (8)
- Kim Bullard – programming (8)
- Carmen Rizzo – programming (8)
- Michael Landau – guitars (5)
- Rob Cavallo – acoustic guitar (8)
- Mark Goldenberg – guitars (8)
- Tim Pierce – guitars (8)
- Michael Thompson – guitars (8, 9)
- Nathan East – electric bass (3, 5)
- John Pierce – electric bass (8)
- Luis Conte – percussion (1, 6, 8, 9, 14)
- Will Donovan – additional percussion (8)
- Bruce Fowler – trombone (4)
- Walt Fowler – trumpet (4)
- Tommy Johnson – tuba (4)
- Joann Turovsky – harp (2)
- Mark Mancina – arrangements (1, 2, 5, 6, 14)
- David Campbell – string arrangements (8)
- Glenn Close – vocals (2)
- Rosie O'Donnell and cast – vocals (4)
- NSYNC – vocals (7)

Score Tracks (10–13)

- Mark Mancina – arrangements
- Phil Collins – drums, all instruments, vocal arrangements
- Marc Mann – additional synthesizer programming
- Fred Selden – Ethnic flutes
- Joann Turovsky – harp
- David Metzger – orchestrations, additional choral arrangements
- Don Harper – score conductor, additional choral arrangements
- Sandy de Crescent – music contractor
- Reggie Wilson – music contractor
- Bobbi Page – vocal contractor
- Fonzi Thornton – vocal contractor
- Deniece LaRocca – music coordinator
- Bukka White – supervising music copyist for Walt Disney Music Library
- Joann Kane Music Service – music librarian for Walt Disney Music Library

== Production ==
Tracks 1–7 & 9–14

- Phil Collins – producer (1, 3–7, 9, 14)
- Mark Mancina – producer (1, 2, 6, 10–14)
- Chris Ward – co-producer (10–13)
- Frank Wolf – recording (1–7, 9, 14), mixing (1–7, 9, 14)
- Steve Kempster – recording (10–13), mixing (10–13)
- Gil Morales – additional engineer
- Andy Bass, Greg Denenn, Tom Hardisty, Jimmy Hoyson, Andy Manganello, David Marquette, Sue McLean, Jay Selvester, Christine Sirois, Tulio Torenello, Rich Weingart and Mike Zainer – recording assistants
- Rich Toenes – technical support
- Ed Ghaffari – music editing
- Robb Boyd – music editing assistant
- Daniel Gaber – music editing assistant
- Tom MacDougall – production manager
- Andrew Page – music production supervisor

Track 8

- Phil Collins – producer
- Rob Cavallo – producer
- Cheryl Jenets – A&R coordinator
- Elliot Scheiner – recording
- Peter Doell – recording assistant
- John Nelson – recording assistant
- Chris Lord-Alge – mixing
- Mike Dy – mix assistant
- Rob Hoffman – mix assistant
- Mike Silva – mix assistant

Other Credits

- Chris Montan – executive producer
- Joe Gastwirt – mastering at Oceanview Digital Mastering (Los Angeles, California)
- Luis M. Hernández – art direction
- John Blas – cover artwork
- Bolhem Bouchiba – cover artwork
- Daniel Clark – cover artwork
- Derek Shields – cover artwork
- Federico F. Tio – cover artwork
- Susan Andrade – design
- Marcella Wong – design
- Glen Keane – character development penciling
- Richard Haughton – back cover photograph of Phil Collins

== Charts ==
=== Album ===
Chart (1999)	Peak position
Australian Albums (ARIA)	40
Austrian Albums (Ö3 Austria)	9
Belgian Albums (Ultratop Flanders)	32
Belgian Albums (Ultratop Wallonia)	28
Canada Top Albums/CDs (RPM)	18
Dutch Albums (Album Top 100)	51
European Albums (Music & Media)	16
French Albums (SNEP)	9
German Albums (Offizielle Top 100)	6
Hungarian Albums (MAHASZ)	8
Japanese Albums Chart (Oricon)	47
New Zealand Albums (RMNZ)	34
Norwegian Albums (VG-lista)	32
Scottish Albums (Official Charts)	58
Spanish Albums (AFYVE)	20
Swiss Albums (Schweizer Hitparade)	11
US Billboard 200	5

=== Year-end charts ===
Chart (1999)	Position
German Albums Chart	79

Chart (2000)	Position
Canadian Albums (Nielsen SoundScan)	152

=== Singles ===
Year	Single	Artist	Chart	Position
1999	"You'll Be in My Heart"	Phil Collins	UK Singles	17
1999	"You'll Be in My Heart"	Phil Collins	Billboard Hot 100	21
1999	"You'll Be in My Heart"	Phil Collins	Adult Contemporary	1
1999	"Strangers Like Me"	Phil Collins	Adult Contemporary	10
2000	"Son of Man"	Phil Collins	German Singles Chart	68
2000	"Two Worlds"	Phil Collins	German Singles Chart	43

== Certifications ==
Region	Certification	Certified units/sales
Austria (IFPI Austria)	Gold	25,000^{*}
Belgium (BRMA)	Gold	25,000^{*}
Canada (Music Canada)	2× Platinum	200,000^{^}
Denmark (IFPI Danmark)	Platinum	20,000^{‡}
France (SNEP)	Gold	100,000^{*}
Germany (BVMI)	Gold	250,000^{^}
Netherlands (NVPI)	Platinum	100,000^{^}
Spain (Promusicae)	Platinum	100,000^{^}
Switzerland (IFPI Switzerland)	Platinum	50,000^{^}
United States (RIAA)	2× Platinum	2,340,000
^{*} Sales figures based on certification alone.^{^} Shipments figures based on certification alone.^{‡} Sales+streaming figures based on certification alone.

== See also ==
- Tarzan musical soundtrack
