= Strangers Like Me =

- Artwork for European releases

Single by Phil Collins

from the album Tarzan: An Original Walt Disney Records Soundtrack
- Released: October 25, 1999
- Length: 3:00
- Label: Walt Disney
- Songwriter: Phil Collins
- Producers: Phil Collins; Rob Cavallo

Phil Collins singles chronology
"Two Worlds" (1999)	"Strangers Like Me" (1999)	"Son of Man" (2000)

Licensed audio
- "Strangers Like Me" on YouTube

"Strangers Like Me" is a song by the English drummer Phil Collins for the soundtrack of Disney's 1999 animated film Tarzan. The song peaked at number ten on the U.S. Billboard Hot Adult Contemporary Tracks chart and received highly positive reviews. Collins also recorded the song in Spanish (Lo extraño que soy), Italian (Al di fuori di me), French (Je veux savoir) and German (Fremde wie ich).

This song has also appeared in the film's Broadway musical.

== Lyrics ==
The song talks about Tarzan's fascination with Jane, Professor Porter, and Clayton, as well as the wider human world he has yet to see. The song has a verse describing Tarzan's feelings for Jane.

== Music video ==
The music video for the song was directed by Dani Jacobs and features Collins performing the song in a jungle, intercut with clips from Tarzan.

== Track listings, formats, and versions ==
=== 2005 CD ===
1. "Strangers Like Me" (Phil Collins's Radio Mix Version)
2. "Strangers Like Me" (Everlife Version) (From "Disney Mania 3")
3. "Trashin' The Camp" (By: *NSYNC & Phil Collins)
4. "Strangers Like Me" (Phil Collins's Radio Mix Version) (Video)
5. "Strangers Like Me" (Everlife Version) (From "Disney Mania 3") (Video)

=== 2005/1999 DVD Single ===
==== 1999 Phil Colins's DVD Single ====
1. "Strangers Like Me" (Phil Collins's Radio Mix Video)
2. "Trashin' The Camp!" (Studio Session Music Video With *NSYNC & Phil Collins) (Video)

==== 2005 Everlife DVD Single ====
1. "Strangers Like Me" (Live) (From "Disney Mania 3") (Video)
2. "Trashin' The Camp!" (Studio Session Music Video With *NSYNC & Phil Collins) (Repeat) (Video)
3. Photo Gallery

=== 2005 Enhanced VCD DualDisc Promo ===
CD Side

1. "Strangers Like Me" (Phil Collins Radio Mix)
2. "Strangers Like Me" (Everlife Version)
3. "Trashin' The Camp!" (By: *NSYNC & Phil Collins)

DVD Side

1. "Strangers Like Me" (Phil Collins Radio Mix' Version) (Music Video)
2. "Strangers Like Me" (Everlife Version) (Live) (Music Video)
3. "Trashin' The Camp!" (Studio Session Music Video With *NSYNC & Phil Collins)

== Personnel ==
- Phil Collins – vocals, keyboards, drums, percussion
- Michael Landau – guitars
- Nathan East – electric bass
- Mark Mancina – arrangements

== Charts ==
=== Weekly charts ===
Weekly chart performance
Chart (1999–2000)	Peak position
Austria (Ö3 Austria Top 40)	28
Canada Adult Contemporary (RPM)	7
Czech Republic Radio (IFPI)	26
Europe (Eurochart Hot 100)	59
Europe (European Radio Top 50)	30
France (SNEP)	52
Germany (GfK)	29
Netherlands (Single Top 100)	75
Netherlands (Tipparade)	18
Switzerland (Schweizer Hitparade)	22
US Adult Contemporary (Billboard)	10

=== All-time charts ===
All-time chart performance
Chart	Rank
UK Disney Streaming (OCC)	73
UK Phil Collins Downloads (OCC)	15
UK Phil Collins Streaming (OCC)	9

== Certifications ==
Certifications and sales
Region	Certification	Certified units/sales
Denmark (IFPI Danmark)	Gold	45,000^{‡}
United Kingdom (BPI)	Silver	200,000^{‡}
United States (RIAA)	Platinum	1,000,000^{‡}
^{‡} Sales+streaming figures based on certification alone.
