= Tarzan (1999 film) =

1999 Disney animated film

- Theatrical release poster
- Directed by: Kevin Lima; Chris Buck
- Screenplay by: Tab Murphy; Bob Tzudiker; Noni White
- Story by: Stephen Anderson; Mark D. Kennedy; Carole Holliday; Gaëtan Brizzi; Paul Brizzi; Don Dougherty; Ed Gombert; Randy Haycock; Don Hall; Kevin L. Harkey; Glen Keane; Burny Mattinson; Frank Nissen; John Norton; Jeff Snow; Michael Surrey; Christopher J. Ure; Mark Walton; Stevie Wermers; Kelly Wightman; John Ramirez
- Based on: Tarzan of the Apes by Edgar Rice Burroughs
- Produced by: Bonnie Arnold
- Starring: Tony Goldwyn; Minnie Driver; Glenn Close; Alex D. Linz; Rosie O'Donnell; Brian Blessed; Nigel Hawthorne; Lance Henriksen; Wayne Knight
- Edited by: Gregory Perler
- Music by: Mark Mancina; Phil Collins (songs)
- Production company: Walt Disney Feature Animation
- Distributed by: Buena Vista Pictures Distribution (Note: Distributed under the Walt Disney Pictures banner.)
- Release dates: June 12, 1999 (El Capitan Theatre); June 18, 1999 (United States)
- Running time: 88 minutes
- Country: United States
- Language: English
- Budget: $130 million
- Box office: $448.2 million

Tarzan is a 1999 American animated adventure film based on the 1912 story Tarzan of the Apes by Edgar Rice Burroughs. Produced by Walt Disney Feature Animation, it was directed by Kevin Lima and Chris Buck, from a screenplay by Tab Murphy and the writing team of Bob Tzudiker and Noni White, and is the first major animated film adaptation of the story. Tony Goldwyn stars as the titular character, alongside Minnie Driver, Glenn Close, Rosie O'Donnell, Alex D. Linz, Brian Blessed, Nigel Hawthorne, Lance Henriksen, and Wayne Knight. The film follows an orphan who is raised by a family of gorillas in Africa after his biological parents are killed by a leopard. Years later, he grows up into a man and meets other humans. He is soon torn between the choice of leaving with them or staying with his animal family.

Pre-production of Tarzan began in 1995, with Lima selected as director and Buck joining him the same year. Following Murphy's first draft, Tzudiker, White, Dave Reynolds, and Jeffrey Stepakoff (the latter two of whom received additional screenplay credits in the final cut), were brought in to reconstruct the third act and add additional material to the screenplay. English recording artist Phil Collins was recruited to compose and record songs integrated with a score by Mark Mancina. Meanwhile, the production team embarked on a research trip to Uganda and Kenya to study the gorillas. The animation of the film combines 2D hand-drawn animation with the extensive use of computer-generated imagery, and it was done in California, Orlando, and Paris, with the pioneering computer animation software system Deep Canvas being predominantly used to create three-dimensional backgrounds.

Tarzan premiered at the El Capitan Theatre in Los Angeles on June 12, 1999, and was released in the United States on June 18. It received positive reviews from critics, who praised its voice performances, music, animation, and action sequences. Against a production budget of $130 million (then the most expensive traditionally animated film ever made until Treasure Planet in 2002), the film grossed $448.2 million worldwide, becoming the fifth highest-grossing film of 1999, the second highest-grossing animated film of 1999 behind Toy Story 2, and the first Disney animated feature to open at first place at the North American box office since Pocahontas (1995). It won the Academy Award for Best Original Song ("You'll Be in My Heart" by Phil Collins). The film has led to many derived works, such as a Broadway adaptation, a television series, and two direct-to-video followups, Tarzan & Jane (2002) and Tarzan II (2005). Due to licensing issues with Edgar Rice Burroughs, Inc., the use of these characters are limited.

== Plot ==
In the 1890s, a British couple and their infant son are shipwrecked on the coast of equatorial West Africa. After building a tree house with parts salvaged from the wreckage, the couple are soon killed by Sabor, a leopard. Kala, a gorilla who lost her own infant to Sabor, discovers the orphaned infant in the treehouse. She rescues him from Sabor and adopts him, naming him Tarzan.

As a child, Tarzan lives in the jungle with Kala, befriending her niece Terk, and the paranoid elephant Tantor. Tarzan finds himself treated differently by the gorillas, including Kerchak, the troop's stern leader and Kala's mate. When Tarzan accepts a dare from Terk, he accidentally triggers an elephant stampede. Infuriated, Kerchak declares Tarzan an outsider. With the support from Kala, Terk, and Tantor, Tarzan makes valiant efforts to improve himself as he grows. Years later, Tarzan saves Kerchak against Sabor's ambush and kills her, earning his reluctant respect.

Meanwhile, British explorer Archimedes Q. Porter, his daughter Jane, and their hunter escort Clayton arrive in Africa to study gorillas. Jane gets distracted by a baby baboon, and is chased by an entire troop, until a curious Tarzan rescues her. Comparing himself to Jane, Tarzan discovers that they are from the same species. He returns Jane to her camp, where Porter and Clayton both take an interest in him. Despite Kerchak's orders to stay away from the humans, Tarzan repeatedly visits the camp to know more about the human world, and falls in love with Jane. But fearing Kerchak's fury, Tarzan refuses to take the trio to the gorillas.

The explorers' ship arrives to retrieve them. Jane persuades Tarzan to return to England with her, explaining he belongs to civilization, and not the jungle. After Jane tearfully rejects Tarzan's pleas, Clayton convinces him to lead the trio to the gorillas, saying that Jane will stay if she sees the gorillas. Having fallen for Jane, Tarzan gets Terk and Tantor to distract Kerchak, allowing Tarzan to guide the trio to the nesting grounds. Discovering the gorillas, the Porters excitedly mingle with them. Kerchak returns unexpectedly and attacks the humans upon seeing Clayton threatening a gorilla. The trio escapes as Tarzan restrains Kerchak who deeply reproaches Tarzan afterwards for betraying the troop. After Tarzan flees in guilt, Kala comforts and takes him to the tree house to reveal his heritage. As Kala will support whatever decision he makes, Tarzan decides to return to England and bids Kala a fond farewell.

Upon boarding the ship, Tarzan and the Porters are ambushed and captured by a group of stowaway poachers. Clayton shows himself and with knowledge of the gorillas' territory, explains to Tarzan his plan to capture and sell all the gorillas for profit before imprisoning him and the Porters in the hold to prevent their interference. Hearing Tarzan's distant anguished yell, Terk and Tantor storm the ship and free the captives, allowing Tarzan to race back to land.

As Clayton and his henchmen begin capturing the gorillas, Tarzan, his friends, and the rallied animals intervene to scare away the henchmen and free the gorillas, including the caged Kala. Clayton mortally shoots Kerchak, and personally battles Tarzan through the rainforest canopy. While pursuing Tarzan across the dense vines with his machete, Clayton becomes entangled and desperately cuts through them, before accidentally hanging himself. Tarzan returns to the dying Kerchak who finally accepts Tarzan as his son, and names him the new gorilla troop's leader.

The next day, as the Porters leave on the ship's rowboat while Tarzan stays behind with the gorillas, Porter encourages Jane to stay with the man she loves. Jane jumps overboard, followed by her father and reunite with Tarzan and his family, solidifying their new life in the jungle.

== Voice cast ==
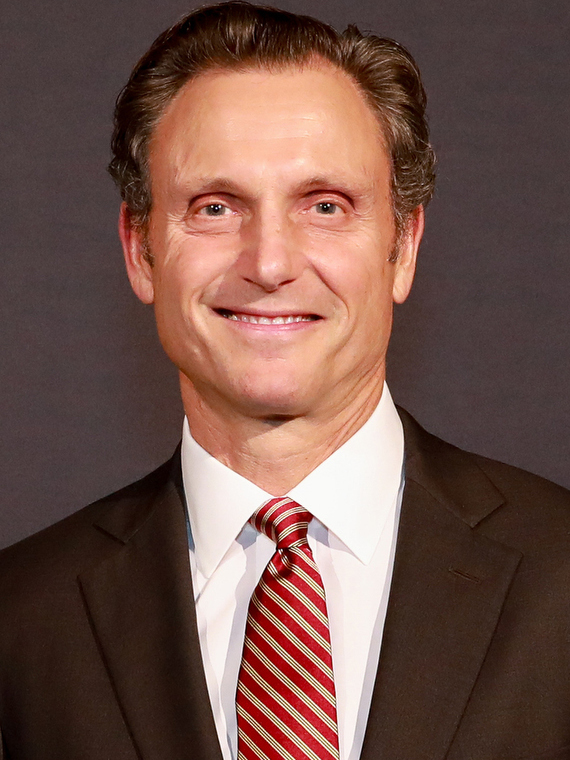
Tony Goldwyn
(Tarzan)

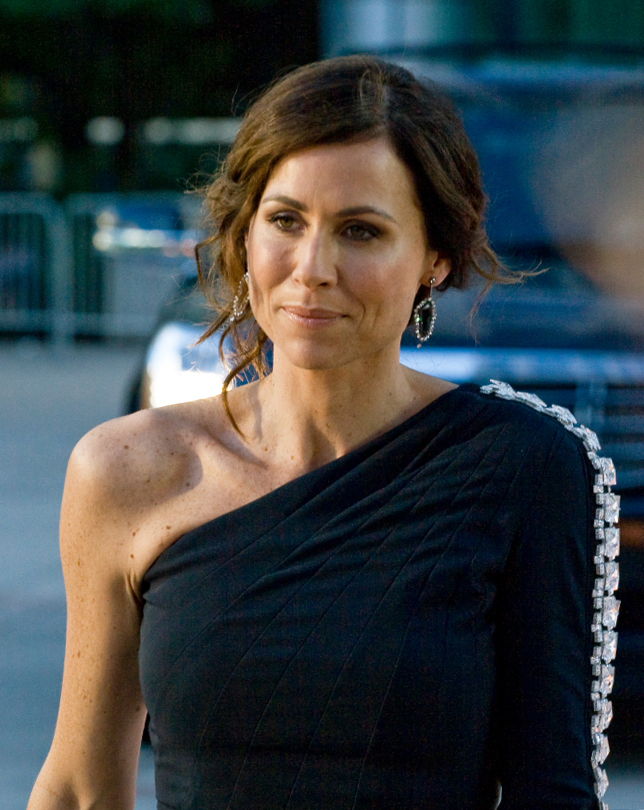
Minnie Driver
(Jane Porter)

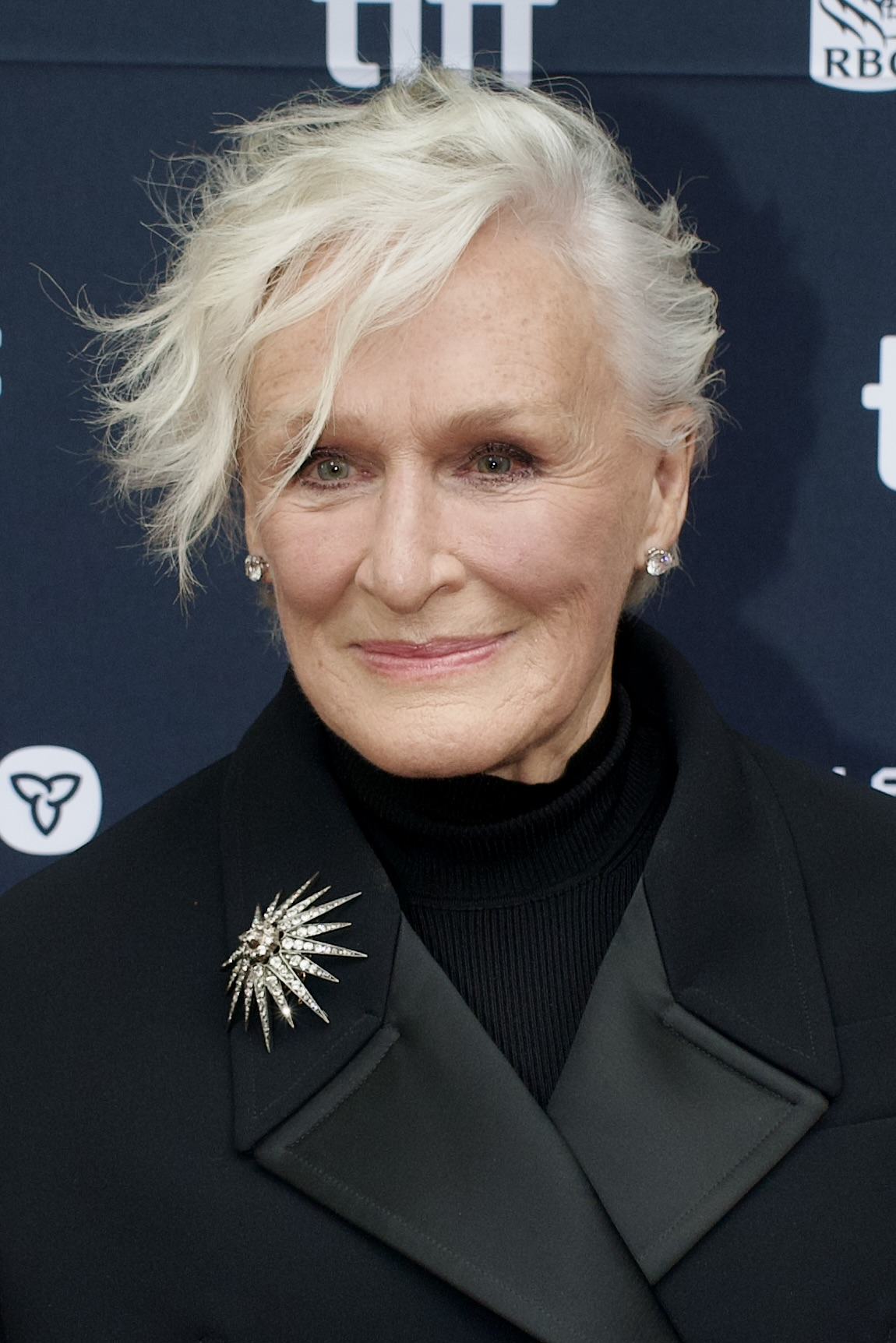
Glenn Close
(Kala)

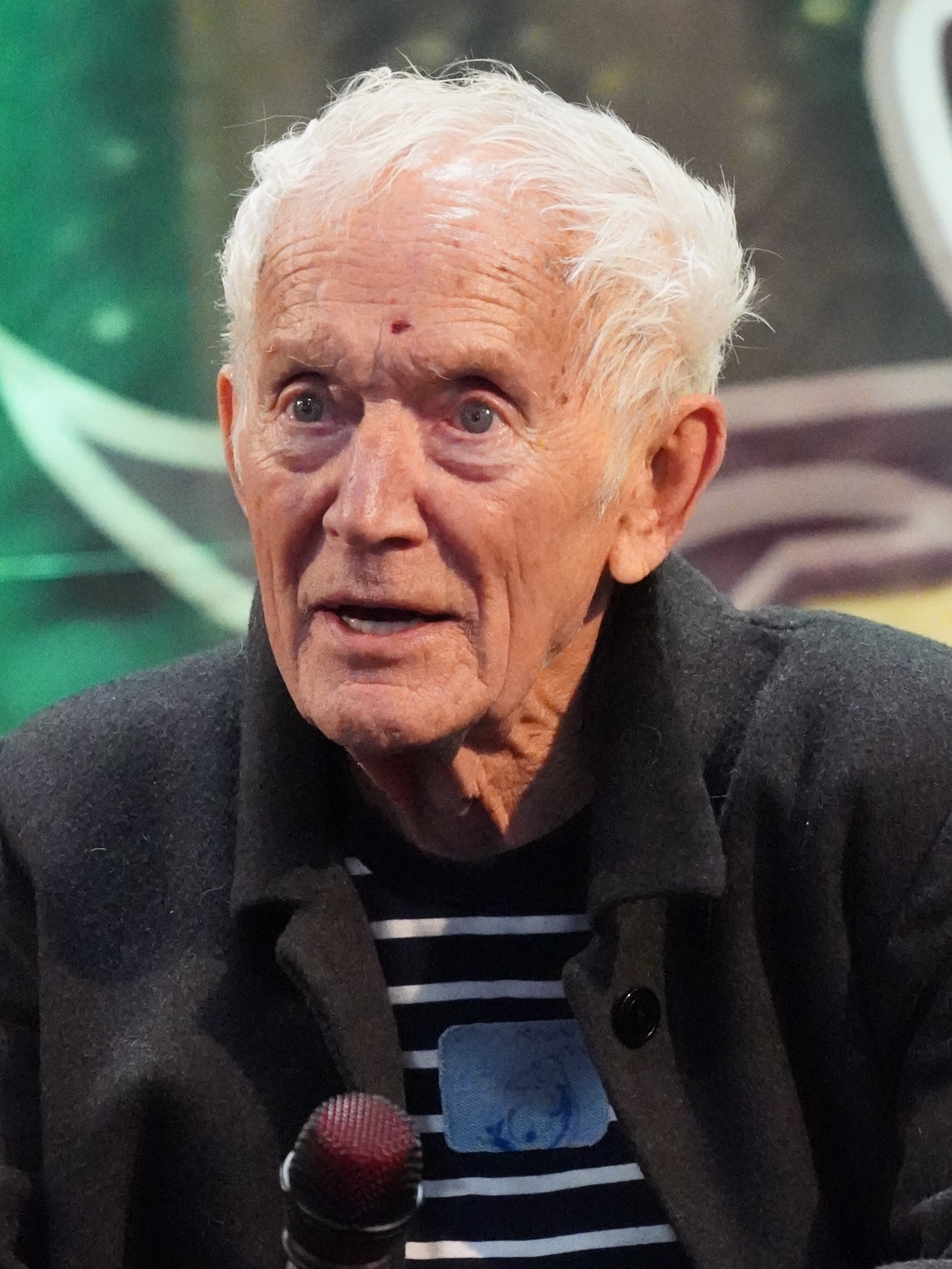
Lance Henriksen
(Kerchak)

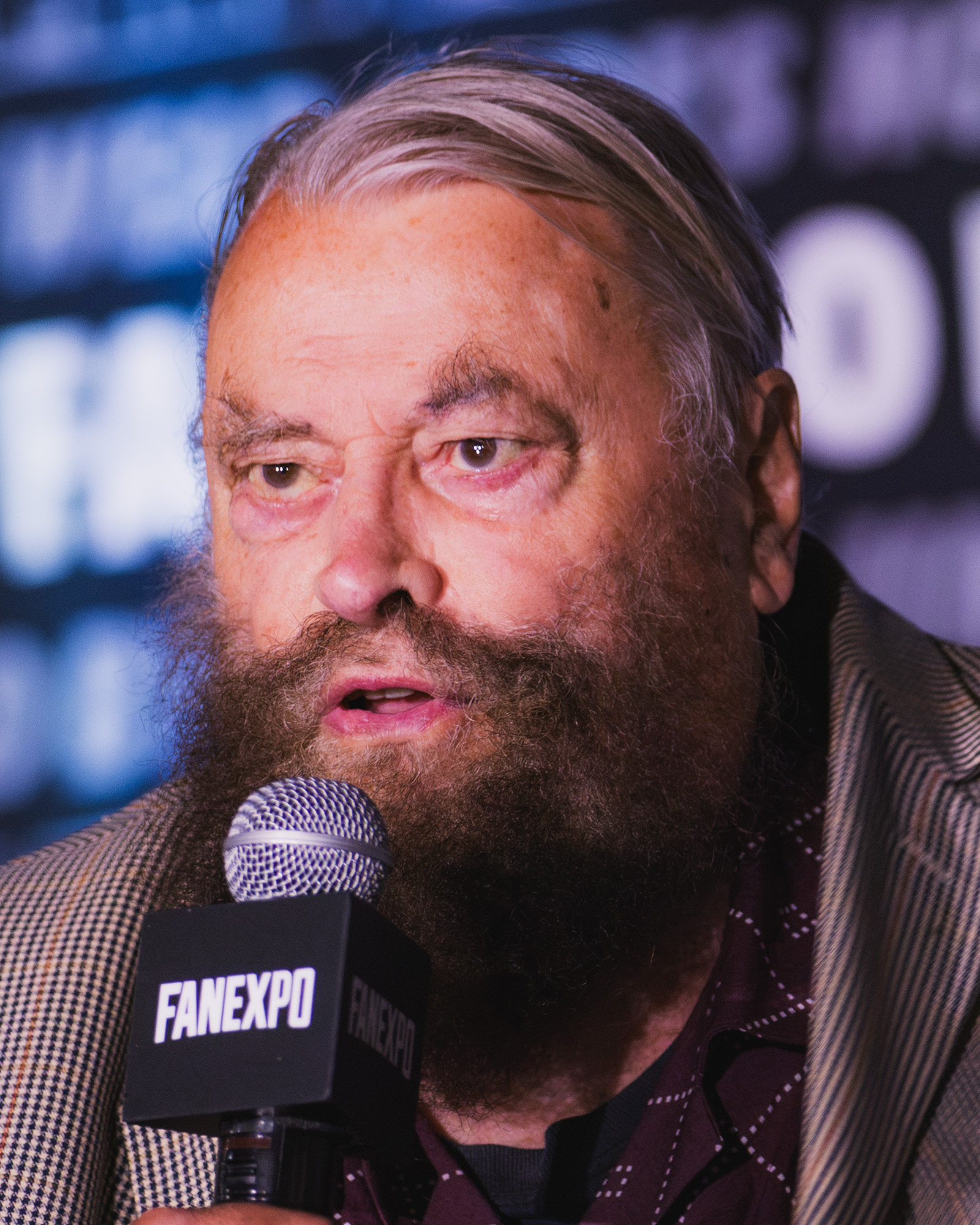
Brian Blessed
(William Cecil Clayton)

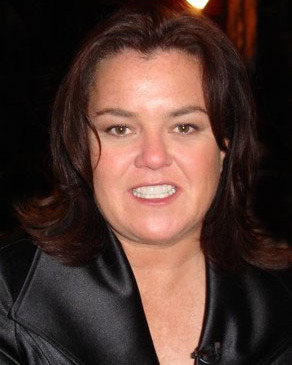
Rosie O'Donnell
(Terk)

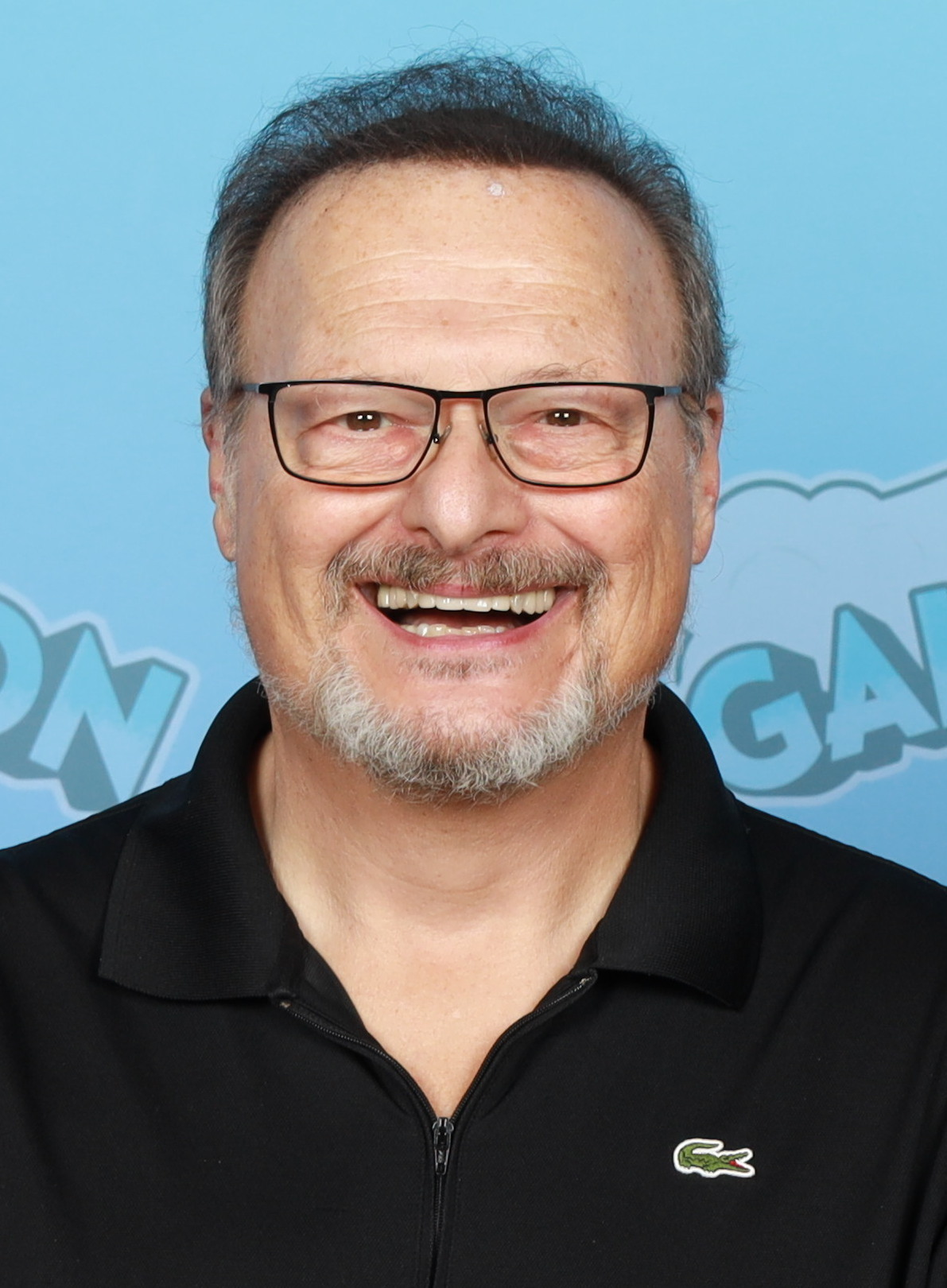
Wayne Knight
(Tantor)

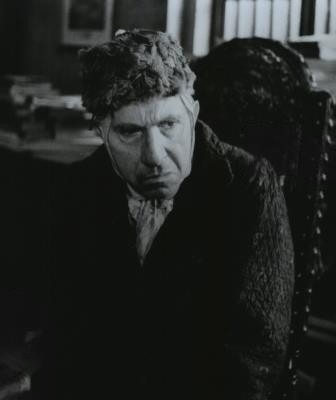
Nigel Hawthorne
(Professor Archimedes Q. Porter)

- Tony Goldwyn as Tarzan, a man raised by gorillas who finds his human roots. Glen Keane served as the supervising animator for Tarzan as an adult, while John Ripa animated Tarzan as an infant and a 7-year-old child. John Ripa studied the movements of young chimpanzees to use for young Tarzan's animation, while Glen Keane used the movements of a gibbon for the animation of adult Tarzan. Keane also watched his son Max Keane skateboarding and snowboarding and referenced surfers' movements to animate the scenes where Tarzan slides across tree branches. Brendan Fraser auditioned twice for the title character before portraying the lead role in George of the Jungle (1997). Goldwyn auditioned for the title role as well, and according to co-director Kevin Lima, Goldwyn landed it because of "the animal sense" in his readings, along with some "killer baboon imitations".
  - Alex D. Linz as young Tarzan
- Minnie Driver as Jane Porter, the eccentric, feisty, benevolent, and intelligent daughter of Professor Porter. She is the first of the group to encounter Tarzan and becomes his love interest. Ken Duncan served as the supervising animator for Jane. Many of Driver's mannerisms and characteristics were incorporated into Jane's animation. The scene where Jane describes meeting Tarzan for the first time to her father and Clayton was improvised by Driver, resulting in Duncan animating one of the longest animated scenes on record. The scene took seven weeks to animate and seventy-three feet of film.
- Rosie O'Donnell as Terk (short for Terkina, a feminization of Terkoz merged with Teeka), a wise-cracking gorilla who is Tarzan's best friend. She is also Kala and Kerchak's niece, making her and Tarzan adoptive cousins. Michael Surrey served as the supervising animator for Terk. The character was originally written as a male gorilla, but after O'Donnell's audition, Terk was re-characterized as a female. Before changing Terk to a female, Chris Rock was offered the role, but turned it down.
- Glenn Close as Kala, Tarzan's adoptive mother, who found and raised him after losing her biological son to Sabor. She is also Kerchak's mate. Russ Edmonds served as the supervising animator for Kala.
- Brian Blessed as Clayton, an intelligent and suave yet arrogant and treacherous professional hunter, who assists the Porters on their quest. Randy Haycock served as the supervising animator for Clayton, basing his design on Clark Gable and other film stars of the 1930s and 40s. Blessed also provided the iconic Tarzan yell for the title character.
- Lance Henriksen as Kerchak, Kala's mate and Tarzan's reluctant adoptive father, a silverback and the leader of the gorilla troop, who struggles to accept Tarzan since he is a human. Bruce W. Smith served as the supervising animator for Kerchak.
- Wayne Knight as Tantor, a paranoid and submissive African forest elephant, and Tarzan and Terk's best friend. Sergio Pablos served as the supervising animator for Tantor. Woody Allen was initially cast as Tantor, but Jeffrey Katzenberg persuaded Allen to leave the project and join DreamWorks' Antz (1998).
  - Taylor Dempsey as young Tantor.
- Nigel Hawthorne as Professor Archimedes Q. Porter, an eccentric, short-statured scientist and Jane's father. Dave Burgess served as the supervising animator for Porter. This was one of Hawthorne's two final acting roles before he died in 2001. This is also the second Disney film Hawthorne starred in following his performance in the earlier Disney film The Black Cauldron (1985).
- Bob Bergen as Vincent Snipes, Clayton's lead henchman.
- Corey Burton as Butch Jones, one of Clayton's henchmen.
- Erik von Detten as Flynt, one of Tarzan and Terk's gorilla friends.
- Jason Marsden as Mungo, one of Tarzan and Terk's gorilla friends.
- Lily Collins as a baby ape
- Shane Sweet as a baby ape
- Debi Derryberry as various monkeys

Additional voices were provided by Jim Cummings, Hillary Brooks, Sherry Lynn, Chris Sanders, Tina Halvorson, and Jonnie Hall.

== Production ==
=== Development ===
Disney's Tarzan was the first Tarzan film to be animated. Thomas Schumacher, then-president of Walt Disney Feature Animation, expressed surprise there had not been any previous attempts to animate a Tarzan film, saying, "Here is a book that cries out to be animated. Yet we're the first filmmakers to have ever taken Tarzan from page to screen and presented the character as Burroughs intended." He noted that in animated form, Tarzan can connect to the animals on a deeper level than he can in live-action versions.

In 1994, when A Goofy Movie (1995) was nearly finished, Kevin Lima was approached to direct Tarzan by then-studio chairman Jeffrey Katzenberg. He had desired to have the film animated through the Disney Television Animation division with a new animation studio established in Canada. Lima was reluctant to the idea because of the animation complexities being done by inexperienced animators. Following Katzenberg's resignation from the Walt Disney Company, Lima was again contacted about the project by Michael Eisner, who decided to have the film produced through the Feature Animation division, by which Lima signed on.

Following this, Lima decided to read Tarzan of the Apes where he began to visualize the theme of two hands being held up against each other. That image became an important symbol of the relationships between characters in the film, and a metaphor of Tarzan's search for identity. "I was looking for something that would underscore Tarzan's sense of being alike, yet different from his ape family", Lima said, "The image of touching hands was first conceived as an idea for how Tarzan realizes he and Jane are physically the same."

Following his two-month study of the book, Lima approached his friend, Chris Buck, who had just wrapped up work as a supervising animator on Pocahontas (1995), to ask if he would be interested in serving as co-director. Buck was initially skeptical but accepted after hearing Lima's ideas for the film. By April 1995, the Los Angeles Times reported that the film was in its preliminary stages with Lima and Buck directing after Disney had obtained the story rights from the estate of Edgar Rice Burroughs.

=== Writing ===
Tab Murphy, who had just finished work on The Hunchback of Notre Dame (1996), was attracted to the theme of man-versus-nature in Tarzan, and began developing a treatment in January 1995. For the third act, Murphy suggested that Tarzan should leave for England, as he did in the book, but the directors felt that it was incompatible with their central theme of what defines a family. In order to keep Tarzan in the jungle, the third act needed to be restructured by redefining the role of the villain and inventing a way to endanger the gorillas. In this departure from Burroughs' novel, a villain named Clayton was created to serve as a guide for Professor Archimedes Q. Porter and his daughter, Jane. In addition to this, Kerchak was re-characterized from a savage silverback into the protector of the gorilla tribe.

In January 1997, husband-and-wife screenwriting duo Bob Tzudiker and Noni White, two other writers of The Hunchback of Notre Dame, were hired to help refocus and add humor to the script as a way to balance the emotional weight of the film. Comedy writer Dave Reynolds was also brought on to write humorous dialogue for the film. "I was initially hired on for six weeks of rewriting and punch-up", Reynolds said, "A year and a half later, I finished. Either they liked my work, or I was very bad at time management." One challenge the writers faced was how Tarzan should learn about his past. "When Kala takes Tarzan back to the tree house, she is essentially telling him that he was adopted", Bonnie Arnold, the producer for Tarzan, said, "This is necessitated by him encountering humans and recognizing he is one of them." As a way to explore the feelings in that scene, Arnold brought in adoptive parents to talk with the story team.

=== Animation ===
The animators were split into two teams, one in Paris and one in Burbank. The 6000-mile distance and difference in time zones posed challenges for collaboration, especially for scenes with Tarzan and Jane. Glen Keane was the supervising animator for Tarzan at the Paris studio, while Ken Duncan was the supervising animator for Jane at the studio in Burbank. To make coordinating scenes with multiple characters easier, the animators used a system called a "scene machine" that could send rough drawings between the two animation studios. Meanwhile, following production on Mulan (1998), two hundred animators at Walt Disney Feature Animation Florida provided character animation and special effects animation where the filmmakers had to discuss their work through daily video conferences among the three studios.

Keane was inspired to make Tarzan "surf" through the trees because of his son's interest in extreme sports, and he began working on a test scene. The directors expressed concern that Tarzan would be made into a "surfer dude". In October 1996, Keane revealed the test animation to them, which they liked it enough that it was used during the "Son of Man" sequence, with movements inspired by skateboarder Tony Hawk, who would later land the first 900 at X Games V in 1999 in front of an ad for the film. Although Keane initially thought that Tarzan would be easy to animate because he only wears a loincloth, he realized that he would need a fully working human musculature while still being able to move like an animal. To figure out Tarzan's movements, the Paris animation team studied different animals in order to transpose their movements onto him. They also consulted with a professor of anatomy. This resulted in Tarzan being the first Disney character to accurately display working muscles.

To prepare for animating the gorillas, the animation team attended lectures on primates, made trips to zoos, and studied nature documentaries, with a group of animators also witnessing a gorilla dissection to learn about their musculature. In March 1996, the production team began a two-week safari in Kenya to take reference photographs and observe the animals. On the trip, they visited Bwindi Impenetrable National Park in Uganda to view mountain gorillas in the wild and get inspiration for the setting. In 2000, Chris Buck repeated the journey accompanied by journalists to promote the film's home video release.

To create the sweeping 3D backgrounds, Tarzan's production team developed a 3D painting and rendering technique known as Deep Canvas (a term coined by artist/engineer Eric Daniels). This technique allows artists to produce CGI backgrounds that look like a traditional painting, according to art director Daniel St. Pierre. (The software keeps track of brushstrokes applied in 3D space.) For this advancement, the Academy of Motion Picture Arts and Sciences awarded the creators of Deep Canvas a Technical Achievement Award in 2003. After Tarzan, Deep Canvas was used for a number of sequences in Atlantis: The Lost Empire (2001), particularly large panoramic shots of the island and several action sequences. Expanded to support moving objects as part of the background, Deep Canvas was used to create about 75 percent of the environments in Disney's next major animated action film, Treasure Planet (2002). It would also be used for isolated shots in Brother Bear (2003) and Home on the Range (2004).

== Music ==
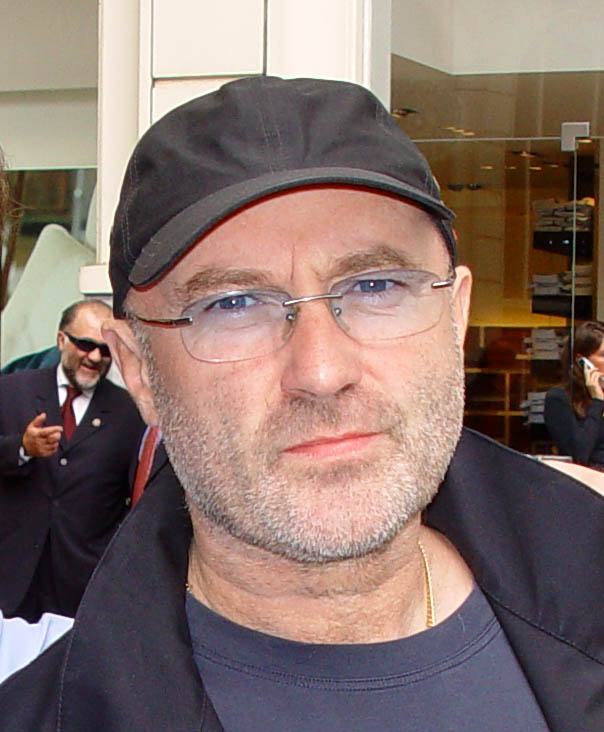
Phil Collins (pictured in 2007) wrote songs for the film.

In 1995, Phil Collins was initially brought onto Tarzan as a songwriter following a recommendation by Disney music executive Chris Montan. Early into production, directors Kevin Lima and Chris Buck decided not to follow Disney's musical tradition by having the characters sing. "I did not want Tarzan to sing", Lima stated, "I just couldn't see this half-naked man sitting on a branch breaking out in song. I thought it would be ridiculous." Instead, Collins would perform the songs in the film serving as the narrator. The choice of Collins, a popular and well established adult contemporary artist, led to comparisons with Elton John's earlier music for The Lion King (1994).

Tarzan was dubbed in thirty-five languages—the most for any Disney movie at the time, and Collins recorded his songs in French, Italian, German, and Spanish for the dubbed versions of the film's soundtrack. According to Collins, most of the songs he wrote for Tarzan came from improvisation sessions and his reactions while reading the treatment. Three of the songs he wrote—"Son of Man", "Trashin' the Camp", and "Strangers Like Me"—were based on his initial impressions after he read the source material. The other two songs were "You'll Be in My Heart", a lullaby sung to Tarzan by Kala (voiced by Glenn Close), and "Two Worlds", a song Collins wrote to serve as the anthem for Tarzan.

The instrumental scoring for the film was composed by Mark Mancina, who had previously produced music for The Lion King (1994), and the musical of the same name. Mancina and Collins worked closely to create music that would complement the film's setting and used many obscure instruments from Mancina's personal collection in the score. "The idea of score and song arrangement came together as one entity, as Phil and I worked in tandem to create what's heard in the film", Mancina said.

== Release ==
On June 12, 1999, the film premiered at the El Capitan Theatre with the cast and filmmakers as attendees followed by a forty-minute concert with Phil Collins performing songs from the film. On July 23, 1999, Disney launched a digital projection release of Tarzan released only in three theatrical venues including Walt Disney World's Pleasure Island multiplex for three weeks. Although Star Wars: Episode I – The Phantom Menace and An Ideal Husband had been given earlier digital projection releases despite being shot on photographic film, Tarzan was notable for being the first major feature release to have been produced, mastered, and projected digitally.

=== Marketing ===
Disney Consumer Products released a series of toys, books, and stuffed animals for Tarzan, partnering with Mattel to produce a line of plush toys and action figures. Mattel also produced the Rad Repeatin' Tarzan action figure, but discontinued it after complaints regarding the toy's onanistic arm motions. Continuing its advertising alliance with McDonald's, its promotional campaign began on the film's opening day with several toys accompanied with Happy Meals and soda straws that replicated the Tarzan yell. Disney also worked with Nestle to create Tarzan themed candies, including a banana-flavored chocolate bar. In early 2000, Disney partnered again with McDonald's to release a set of eight Happy Meal toys as a tie-in for the film's home video. They also offered Tarzan themed food options, such as banana sundaes and jungle burgers.

=== Home media ===
On February 1, 2000, the film was released on VHS and DVD, as well as on LaserDisc on June 23, 2000, only in Japan, making Tarzan the last Disney animated feature to be released on the latter format. The DVD version contained bonus material, including the "Strangers Like Me" music video, the making of "Trashin' the Camp" featuring Collins and 'N Sync, and an interactive trivia game. A 2-Disc Collector's Edition was released on April 18, 2000. It included an audio commentary track recorded by the filmmakers, behind-the-scenes footage, and supplements that detailed the legacy of Tarzan and the film's development. These THX certified DVD releases also featured a sneak peek for Dinosaur (2000), and a DVD-ROM. Both editions were placed in moratorium on January 31, 2002, and placed back into the Disney Vault. By January 2001, the film was the most successful home video release of 2000, earning retail revenues of $268 million.

On October 18, 2005, Disney released the Tarzan Special Edition on DVD. Tarzan's first Blu-ray edition was released throughout Europe in early 2012, and on August 12, 2014, Disney released the Tarzan Special Edition on Blu-ray, DVD, and Digital HD.

== Reception ==
=== Box office ===
Pre-release box office tracking indicated that Tarzan was appealing to all four major demographics noticeably for the first time for a Disney animated film since The Lion King (1994). The film was given a limited release on June 16, 1999, and its wide release followed two days later in 3,005 screens. During the weekend of June 18–21, Tarzan grossed $34.1 million, ranking first at the box office above Austin Powers: The Spy Who Shagged Me (1999) and The General's Daughter (1999). At the time, it also ranked second behind The Lion King (1994), which had earned $40.9 million, as the highest-earning box office opening for a Disney animated film. In its second weekend, the film would drop into second place behind Big Daddy (1999), making $23.5 million. By August 1999, the domestic gross was projected to approach $170 million. Ultimately, the film closed its box office run earning $448.2 million worldwide.

In the United Kingdom, Tarzan collected $5 million during its opening weekend, beating out American Pie (1999), Deep Blue Sea (1999), and Bowfinger (1999) to reach the number one spot at the box office. It had the highest opening weekend for a traditionally animated film in the country, taking the previous record held by The Lion King (1994). The film also managed to earn $1.4 million in Sweden, making it the country's third-highest opening weekend in history, after the latter film and Independence Day (1996). Then, it earned $7.2 million in France, making it the fourth-highest opening there, trailing Star Wars: Episode I – The Phantom Menace (1999), Asterix & Obelix vs. Caesar (1999), and The Visitors II: The Corridors of Time (1998). Additionally, the film made $2.5 million in Spain, surpassing Ransom (1996) as the country's highest opening weekend for any Disney film.

=== Critical reaction ===
On the review aggregation website Rotten Tomatoes, 90% of 158 critics' reviews are positive, with an average rating of 8.1/10. The website's consensus reads, "Disney's Tarzan takes the well-known story to a new level with spirited animation, a brisk pace, and some thrilling action set-pieces." Metacritic, which uses a weighted average, assigned the film a score of 80 out of 100, based on 27 critics, indicating "generally favorable reviews". Audiences polled by CinemaScore gave the film an average grade of "A" on an A+ to F scale.

Entertainment Weekly compared the film's advancement in visual effects to that of The Matrix, stating that it had "the neatest computer-generated background work since Keanu Reeves did the backstroke in slow motion". They elaborate by describing how the characters moved seamlessly through the backgrounds themselves, giving the film a unique three-dimensional feel that far surpassed the quality of previous live-action attempts. Roger Ebert gave the film his highest rating of four stars, and he had similar comments about the film, describing it as representing "another attempt by Disney to push the envelope of animation", with scenes that "move through space with a freedom undreamed of in older animated films, and unattainable by any live-action process". Awarding the film three stars, James Berardinelli wrote: "From a purely visual standpoint, this may be the most impressive of all of Disney's traditionally animated features. The backdrops are lush, the characters are well realized, and the action sequences are dizzying, with frequent changes of perspectives and camera angles. No conventional animated film has been this ambitious before." Desson Howe, writing for The Washington Post, claimed the film "isn't up there with Aladdin, The Lion King and The Little Mermaid, but it's easily above the riffraff ranks of Hercules and Pocahontas". Todd McCarthy of Variety proved to be less amused by the animation, claiming it was "richly detailed and colorfully conceived, but the computer animation and graphics are often intermingled and combined in ways that are more distracting in their differences than helpful in their vividness".

Lisa Schwarzbaum, who graded the film an A−, applauded the film as "a thrilling saga about a natural man, untainted by the complications of 'civilized' life, who can anticipate changes in the air by sniffing the wind — swings because the Disney team, having sniffed the wind, went out on a limb and kept things simple". Peter Stack of the San Francisco Chronicle admired the film for tackling "meanings of family relationships and ideas about society, guardianship and compassion" and "cunning and greed and the ultimate evil", as well as remaining faithful to Burroughs's original novel. Kenneth Turan of Los Angeles Times wrote that the "story unfolds with dangers as well as warm humor; a jungle jam session called 'Trashin' the Camp' is especially hard to resist. We may have seen it all before, but when it's done up like this, experiencing it all over again is a pleasure." Janet Maslin, reviewing for The New York Times, similarly opined that "Tarzan initially looks and sounds like more of the same, to the point where Phil Collins is singing the words 'trust your heart' by the third line of his opening song. But it proves to be one of the more exotic blooms in the Disney hothouse, what with voluptuous flora, hordes of fauna, charming characters and excitingly kinetic animation that gracefully incorporates computer-generated motion."

The Radio Times review was not as positive, stating the film "falls way short of Disney's best output" and featured "weak comic relief". The review concluded, "Lacking the epic sweep of Mulan or The Lion King, and laced with feeble background songs from Phil Collins (inexplicably awarded an Oscar), this King of the Swingers may be merchandise-friendly, but it's no jungle VIP." Michael Wilmington of the Chicago Tribune, while giving the film three stars, wrote that Tarzan "lacks that special pizazz that the string of Disney cartoon features from The Little Mermaid through The Lion King all had". He found faults in the film's removal of all African characters, lack of romantic tension between Tarzan and Jane, and the songs by Phil Collins, comparing them unfavorably with Elton John's "showstoppers" for The Lion King. He wrote "depriving the characters of big numbers weakens the movie".

Ty Burr of Entertainment Weekly gave the soundtrack a B−, stating that it was awkwardly split between Collins's songs and the traditional score, was burdened by too many alternate versions of the tracks, and in some instances bore similarities to the scores of The Lion King and Star Wars.

=== Accolades ===
List of awards and nominations
Award	Category	Nominee(s)	Result	Ref.
Academy Awards	Best Original Song	"You'll Be in My Heart"; Music and Lyrics by Phil Collins	Won	
Annie Awards	Best Animated Feature	Bonnie Arnold	Nominated	
Annie Awards	Outstanding Individual Achievement for Character Animation	Ken Duncan	Nominated	
Annie Awards	Outstanding Individual Achievement for Character Animation	Glen Keane	Nominated	
Annie Awards	Outstanding Individual Achievement for Directing in an Animated Feature Production	Kevin Lima and Chris Buck	Nominated	
Annie Awards	Outstanding Individual Achievement for Effects Animation	Peter De Mund	Nominated	
Annie Awards	Outstanding Individual Achievement for Music in an Animated Feature Production	"Two Worlds"; Music and Lyrics by Phil Collins	Nominated	
Annie Awards	Outstanding Individual Achievement for Production Design in an Animated Feature Production	Daniel St. Pierre	Nominated	
Annie Awards	Outstanding Individual Achievement for Storyboarding in an Animated Feature Production	Brian Pimental	Nominated	
Annie Awards	Outstanding Individual Achievement for Voice Acting in an Animated Feature Production	Minnie Driver	Nominated	
Annie Awards	Outstanding Individual Achievement for Writing in an Animated Feature Production	Tab Murphy, Bob Tzudiker, and Noni White	Nominated	
Annie Awards	Technical Achievement in the Field of Animation	Eric Daniels	Won	
Artios Awards	Animated Voice-Over Feature Casting	Ruth Lambert	Won	
Golden Globe Awards	Best Original Song	"You'll Be in My Heart"; Music and Lyrics by Phil Collins	Won	
Golden Reel Awards	Best Sound Editing – Animated Feature	Per Hallberg, Curt Schulkey, Craig S. Jaeger, Christopher Assells, Scott Martin Gershin, Lou Kleinman, Geoffrey G. Rubay, and Peter Michael Sullivan	Nominated	
Golden Reel Awards	Best Sound Editing – Music – Animated Feature	Earl Ghaffari	Nominated	
Grammy Awards	Best Soundtrack Album	Tarzan: An Original Walt Disney Records; Soundtrack – Phil Collins and Mark Mancina	Won	
Grammy Awards	Best Song Written for a Motion Picture, Television or Other Visual Media	"You'll Be in My Heart" – Phil Collins	Nominated	
Las Vegas Film Critics Society Awards	Best Animated Film	Kevin Lima and Chris Buck	Nominated	
Las Vegas Film Critics Society Awards	Best Song	"You'll Be in My Heart"; Music and Lyrics by Phil Collins	Nominated	
Nickelodeon Kids' Choice Awards	Favorite Voice from an Animated Movie	Rosie O'Donnell	Won	
Nickelodeon Kids' Choice Awards	Favorite Song from a Movie	"Two Worlds"; Music and Lyrics by Phil Collins	Nominated	
Online Film & Television Association Awards	Best Original Song	"You'll Be in My Heart"; Music and Lyrics by Phil Collins	Nominated	
Satellite Awards	Best Animated or Mixed Media Feature		Nominated	
Saturn Awards	Best Fantasy Film		Nominated	
Young Artist Awards	Best Family Feature Film – Animated		Nominated	
Young Artist Awards	Best Performance in a Voice-Over (TV or Feature Film) – Young Actor	Alex D. Linz	Nominated	

The film is recognized by American Film Institute in these lists:

- 2004: AFI's 100 Years...100 Songs:
  - "You'll Be in My Heart" – Nominated
- 2008: AFI's 10 Top 10:
  - Nominated Animation Film

== Legacy ==
=== Television series ===
A spin-off animated series, The Legend of Tarzan, ran from 2001 to 2003. The series picks up where the film left off, with Tarzan adjusting to his new role as leader of the apes following Kerchak's death, and Jane (whom he has since married) adjusting to life in the jungle.

=== Direct-to-video followups ===
In July 1999, Disney announced that they were planning a sequel for Tarzan. In 2002, Tarzan & Jane was released as a direct-to-video sequel, with Michael T. Weiss replacing Goldwyn as the voice of Tarzan. Tarzan II, a direct-to-video follow-up, was released in 2005.

=== Broadway musical ===
A Broadway musical produced by Disney Theatrical, also titled Tarzan, began previews on March 24, 2006. It had an official opening night on May 10 of the same year. After running for over a year on Broadway, the show closed on July 8, 2007.

=== Video games ===
Five Tarzan video games have been released on various platforms. Tarzan's home is also featured as a playable world, "Deep Jungle", in the 2002 game Kingdom Hearts, and in the 2013 HD remaster Kingdom Hearts HD 1.5 Remix, in which Goldwyn and Blessed were the only actors from the film to reprise their roles, while Jane was voiced by Naia Kelly and Audrey Wasilewski reprised her role as Terk from the 1999 video game based on the film. Kerchak and Kala appeared, but were silent, while Tantor and Professor Porter were absent. The world was originally meant to return in Kingdom Hearts: Chain of Memories, but ultimately did not appear and has not appeared in any subsequent Kingdom Hearts games.

=== Legal issues ===
Edgar Rice Burroughs, Inc. owns the rights for the Tarzan franchise and the use of these characters are hence limited. During the production of the crossover animated television series House of Mouse, showrunners Bobs Gannaway and Tony Craig, added Tantor for a cameo appearance, despite being prohibited from using the rest of all characters outside the franchise. The same characters were omitted from Jam City app Disney Emoji Blitz. The Tarzan's Treehouse attraction was omitted from the open world video game Kinect: Disneyland Adventures.

== Bibliography ==
- Green, Howard (1999). The Tarzan Chronicles. New York: Hyperion. ISBN 978-0-7868-6403-4.
