= Son of Man (song) =

- Artwork for French and German retail singles

Single by Phil Collins

from the album Tarzan: An Original Walt Disney Records Soundtrack
- B-side: "You'll Be in My Heart"
- Released: 8 February 2000
- Length: 2:44
- Label: Walt Disney
- Songwriter: Phil Collins
- Producer: Phil Collins

Phil Collins singles chronology
"Strangers Like Me" (1999)	"Son of Man" (2000)	"In the Air Tonite" (2001)

Licensed audio
- "Son of Man" on YouTube

"Son of Man" is a song by Phil Collins for the soundtrack of Disney's Tarzan. In the 1999 animated film, the song accompanies a montage in which Tarzan learns how to be an ape and progresses from childhood to adulthood. Along the way, he picks up skills from fellow jungle inhabitants, and he duels with an African rock python. The song peaked at number 68 on the German Media Control Charts as well as at number 96 on the French singles chart.

== Track listing ==
1. "Son of Man" - 2:44
2. "You'll Be in My Heart" - 4:18

== Personnel ==
- Phil Collins – vocals, instruments, songwriting, production
- Nathan East – electric bass

== Charts ==
Chart (2000)	Peak position
French Singles Chart	96
German Singles Chart	68

== Certifications ==
Region	Certification	Certified units/sales
United States (RIAA)	Gold	500,000^{‡}
^{‡} Sales+streaming figures based on certification alone.
