= Mulan (video game) =

1998 video game

- North American cover art
- Developer: Tiertex
- Publisher: THQ
- Platform: Game Boy
- Release: NA: 16 October 1998; EU: 1998
- Genre: Action
- Mode: Single-player

Mulan is a 1998 action game developed by Tiertex and published by THQ for the Game Boy. It is based on the 1998 animated film of the same name. It was released on 16 October 1998, two days before the release of the Game Boy Color.

Reception

Review scores
Publication	Score
EP Daily	5/10
Joypad	2/10
Nintendo Power	4.6/10
Pockett Videogames	1/5
