= You'll Be in My Heart =

Song by Phil Collins

- Artwork for US and European retail singles

Single by Phil Collins

from the album Tarzan: An Original Walt Disney Records Soundtrack
- B-side: "Trashin' the Camp"
- Released: May 19, 1999
- Length: 4:17
- Label: Walt Disney
- Songwriter: Phil Collins
- Producers: Phil Collins; Rob Cavallo

Phil Collins singles chronology
"True Colors" (1998)	"You'll Be in My Heart" (1999)	"Two Worlds" (1999)

Audio
- "You'll Be In My Heart" on YouTube

"You'll Be in My Heart" is a song by the English musician Phil Collins from the 1999 Disney animated feature Tarzan. It appeared on Tarzan: An Original Walt Disney Records Soundtrack as well as various other Disney compilations. It won the Academy Award for Best Original Song, and became Collins' last US top-40 single, peaking at number 21.

The music video for the song was directed by Kevin Godley. Phil Collins also recorded the song in French ("Toujours dans mon cœur"), German ("Dir gehört mein Herz"), Italian ("Sei dentro me") and Spanish ("En mi corazón vivirás") aside from his native English. A version of the single performed by him with Glenn Close also appears on the soundtrack.

== Production and context ==
Phil Collins was initially hired for the Tarzan soundtrack in 1995 as a songwriter. Given his background as a drummer with the rock band Genesis, the production team believed his rhythmic sensibilities could lend a strong jungle beat to Tarzan. Early into production, directors Kevin Lima and Chris Buck decided not to follow Disney's musical tradition by having the characters sing and instead, Phil Collins perform the songs in the film serving as the narrator. "You'll Be in My Heart" is one of the original songs that he wrote for the film.

The song, originally written for his daughter Lily, who was ten years old at the time, was called "Lullaby". It was used in a scene where Tarzan's adoptive gorilla mother Kala reassures her baby by telling him that "you will be in my heart always". The song is about "how love is a bond that cannot be broken".

== International versions ==
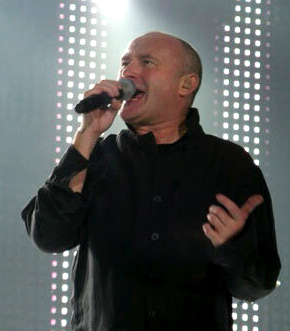
Phil Collins also recorded "You'll Be in My Heart" in French, German, Italian and Spanish aside from his native English for the international dubbing of Tarzan.

The entire Tarzan soundtrack, including "You'll Be in My Heart", was also performed by Phil Collins in various other languages besides his native English, namely German, French, Spanish and Italian. Most dubbings played the full English version of the song by Collins at the end credits but it has six versions in other languages and includes his full Spanish version that played for the European and Latin American dubbing, which marks Phil Collins' only appearance on Billboard's Hot Latin Tracks, the song charting at number 32. He also performed the German version of "You'll Be in My Heart" on German TV.

Masayuki Sakamoto of 20th Century covered the song for dubbed Japanese release. The song was released on the Wishes single, which entered the Oricon singles chart for seven weeks, reaching peak level at number 10. Singer-songwriter Billy Simpson covered the song in Indonesian (as "Kau Di Hatiku") for the 2015 compilation album We Love Disney. Taiwanese singer Wakin Chau recorded the song for the Mandarin Chinese and Cantonese releases.

== Critical reception and awards ==
The Manila Standard said Collins "waxes poetic" with the song. The Disney Song Encyclopedia deemed it an "uptempo ballad" and "tender song". Gerald Bordman and Richard Norton, in their book American Musical Theatre: A Chronicle, wrote that Merle Dandridge, who performed this song as the role of Tarzan's adoptive mother Kala in the Broadway version, had "the best song". In his book American Literature on Stage and Screen: 525 Works and Their Adaptations, Thomas S. Hischak said this song was "contemporary sounding yet [its] rhythmic momentum blended beautifully with the pulsating sounds of the jungle". In 2003, an article for Billboard magazine noted the song ran "in the same vein" as another Collins song "Can't Stop Loving You". In 2009, Jody Kerchner and Carlos Abril, in their book Musical Experience in Our Lives: Things We Learn and Meanings We Make, recounted a personal story of how the song has a special meaning to a mother/daughter relationship, which involved fetus-singing. Similar stories were recounted by two other sources.

Soon after the song was released, it was already "being touted as an Oscar contender". The song went on to win the Golden Globe Award for Best Original Song and the Academy Award for Best Original Song. Collins performed the song live at that year's ceremony. The song also received a Grammy Award nomination for Best Song Written for a Motion Picture, Television or Other Visual Media, but lost to Madonna's "Beautiful Stranger" from Austin Powers: The Spy Who Shagged Me.

== Chart performance ==
"You'll Be in My Heart" spent 19 non-consecutive weeks at number one on the US Billboard Adult Contemporary chart—the longest stay up to that point,—and peaked at number 21 on the Billboard Hot 100. It was Collins's first top-40 hit on the Hot 100 since 1994's "Everyday", as well as his last top 40 hit as of 2026. The track also peaked at number 17 on the UK Singles Chart.

== Personnel ==
- Phil Collins – lead and backing vocals, drums
- Rob Cavallo – acoustic guitar
- Mark Goldenberg, Tim Pierce, Michael Thompson – electric guitar
- Jamie Muhoberac – acoustic piano, keyboards
- John Pierce – electric bass
- Luis Conte – percussion
- Kim Bullard, Carmen Rizzo – programming
- Will Donovan – additional percussion
- David Campbell – string arrangements

Movie version

- JoAnn Turovsky – harp
- Mark Mancina – arrangements
- Glenn Close – vocals

== Charts ==
=== Weekly charts ===
Chart (1999)	Peak position
Australia (ARIA)	43
Austria (Ö3 Austria Top 40)	30
Belgium (Ultratop 50 Flanders)	34
Canada Top Singles (RPM)	16
Canada Adult Contemporary (RPM)	1
Czech Republic (IFPI)	6
Estonia (Eesti Top 20)	7
Europe (Eurochart Hot 100)	69
Germany (GfK)	20
Iceland (Íslenski Listinn Topp 40)	35
Netherlands (Dutch Top 40)	37
Netherlands (Single Top 100)	35
New Zealand (Recorded Music NZ)	13
Nicaragua (Notimex)	4
Panama (Notimex)	5
Poland Airplay (Music & Media)	8
Scottish Singles Sales (Official Charts)	15
Switzerland (Schweizer Hitparade)	24
UK Singles (Official Charts)	17
UK Airplay (Music Week)	35
UK Indie (Official Charts)	7
US Billboard Hot 100	21
US Adult Contemporary (Billboard)	1
US Adult Pop Airplay (Billboard)	21

=== Year-end charts ===
Chart (1999)	Position
Brazil (Crowley)	60
Canada Adult Contemporary (RPM)	3
US Adult Contemporary (Billboard)	3
US Adult Top 40 (Billboard)	49

Chart (2000)	Position
US Adult Contemporary (Billboard)	8

== Certifications ==
Region	Certification	Certified units/sales
Denmark (IFPI Danmark)	Platinum	90,000^{‡}
New Zealand (RMNZ)	Platinum	30,000^{‡}
Spain (Promusicae)	Gold	30,000^{‡}
United Kingdom (BPI)	Platinum	600,000^{‡}
United States (RIAA)	3× Platinum	3,000,000^{‡}
United States (RIAA) Duet version	Gold	500,000^{‡}
^{‡} Sales+streaming figures based on certification alone.

== Cover versions ==
Actor and singer Michael Crawford covered the song on The Disney Album (2001).

Singer Usher covered the song for 2002's Disneymania, a compilation of Disney covers by contemporary pop stars.

In the 2006 stage version, the song is performed by Kala with the ensemble, while a reprise is performed by Merle Dandridge as Kala and Daniel Manche as Young Tarzan when the latter "decides to join the human world". This was because the omniscience of Collins' songs did not translate too well, so the song along with "Two Worlds" "perform similar thematic and character introductions on stage".

Indonesian singer Niki covered the song for Spotify Singles in 2022, and her version later topped Billboard's Indonesian singles chart in April 2025 after resurging online. On the chart dated April 24, her cover had reached number 107 on the Billboard Global 200.

== See also ==
- List of number-one adult contemporary singles of 1999 (U.S.)
