= Two Worlds (song) =

1999 single by Phil Collins

- Japanese single

Single by Phil Collins

from the album Tarzan: An Original Walt Disney Records Soundtrack
- B-side: "You'll Be in My Heart"
- Released: August 25, 1999
- Genre: Worldbeat; orchestral pop
- Length: 3:18
- Label: Walt Disney
- Songwriter: Phil Collins
- Producer: Phil Collins

Phil Collins singles chronology
"You'll Be in My Heart" (1999)	"Two Worlds" (1999)	"Strangers Like Me" (1999)

Licensed audio
- "Two Worlds" on YouTube

"Two Worlds" is a song by English drummer and singer Phil Collins that serves as the main theme for Disney's 1999 film Tarzan and the spinoff animated series The Legend of Tarzan.

== Production ==
"Two Worlds" was the first song that Phil Collins wrote for the film. After writing the piece, he collaborated with score composer Mark Mancina to ensure the musical motifs carried throughout the movie. Mancina emphasised the need for cohesiveness in the score, so "the songs didn't sound like they were recorded two years before and just dropped in". The song is a key example of how musical continuity is present across the soundtrack, with "Two Worlds" woven into the musical tapestry of the film multiple times.

Phil Collins recorded the song in English (Two Worlds), Spanish (Dos Mundos), Italian (Se vuoi), French (Entre deux mondes), and German (Zwei Welten). In addition to the song's inclusion on the film soundtrack, it was also released as a single. A CD single was released in Japan on August 25, 1999, and in Germany on September 18, 2000. The song appeared on the German Singles Charts for five weeks, peaking at number 43 in October 2000.

In the Disney Interactive video game Tarzan Activity Center, an activity entitled "Tarzan's Sing and Swing" gave players the ability to either listen to three Tarzan songs, among them "Two Worlds", or sing along to a karaoke version of them.

== Context in Tarzan ==
The song plays as the opening song to the movie immediately after the title credits, and is used multiple times throughout the film to reinforce the notion of Tarzan being torn between two worlds. It appears four times on the soundtrack. The main version of the song appears in the film's opening, as musical accompaniment to a montage involving a leopard killing Tarzan's parents and him being washed upon the shore. It shows the two families Tarzan will call his own: his human family that birthed him and the family of gorillas that raise him. The song also appears in a reprise at the movie's finale when Jane and her father decide to stay in Africa. In addition, a pop version by Phil Collins which appears in the credits also features on the soundtrack.

== Critical reception ==
The song received generally positive reviews from music and film critics. While positively receiving its style and significance to a core scene, some thought its numerous reprises were unneeded.

AllMusic reviewer Stephen Thomas Erlewine thought the song, Tarzan's main theme, was a "particular standout", and commented that it "eerily echo[ed]" the worldbeats found in the work of his former Genesis colleague Peter Gabriel; however he criticised the song's repetition throughout the film. Similarly, while Howard Cohen of Knight Ridder offered high praise for the song's "punchy rhythm", he thought the four versions of the song dragged down the quality of the soundtrack as "excess filler". Meanwhile, Eileen Fitzpatrick of Billboard wrote that the song "pounds" over a climactic scene in the film while the magazine's Catherina Applefeld Olsen described it as "rhythmic lullaby". Richard L. Eldredge of the Star Tribune thought the "majestic" song had a driving rhythm and "didn't disappoint", while David Ansen of Newsweek thought the ballad saw the film's themes of difference "hammered out".

== Track listings ==
Japanese CD single

1. "Two Worlds"
2. "Two Worlds" (Spanish version)
3. "You'll Be in My Heart" (Spanish version)

German CD single

1. "Two Worlds" (Phil version) – 2:23
2. "Dir gehört mein Herz" (live) – 2:52
3. "Entre deux mondes" ("Two Worlds" – French movie version) – 3:19
4. Tarzan video trailer

== Charts ==
Chart (2000)	Peak position
Germany (GfK)	43
Switzerland (Schweizer Hitparade)	91

== Certifications ==
Region	Certification	Certified units/sales
United States (RIAA)	Gold	500,000^{‡}
^{‡} Sales+streaming figures based on certification alone.

== Release history ==
Region	Date	Format(s)	Label(s)	Ref.
Japan	August 25, 1999	CD	Walt Disney	
German	September 18, 2000	CD	Walt Disney; Edel	
