= List of awards and nominations received by Disney Renaissance films =

The Disney Renaissance was the period from 1989 to 1999 during which Walt Disney Feature Animation returned to producing critically and commercially successful animated films that were mostly based on well-known stories, much as the studio did during the era of Walt Disney during the 1930s to 1960s. The resurgence allowed Disney's animated films to become powerhouse successes at the domestic and foreign box office, earning much greater profit than most of the Disney films of previous eras.

The animated films released by Disney during this period are: The Little Mermaid (1989), The Rescuers Down Under (1990), Beauty and the Beast (1991), Aladdin (1992), The Lion King (1994), Pocahontas (1995), The Hunchback of Notre Dame (1996), Hercules (1997), Mulan (1998), and Tarzan (1999).

In just ten years, Disney Renaissance films have received many awards and nominations. Nine of the ten films were nominated for Academy Awards, six of which won at least one Academy Award; six Best Original Song and five Best Original Score, with the first five films won awards in both categories. Disney Renaissance is also notable for being its film Beauty and the Beast became the first animated film ever to be nominated for Best Picture. Nine of the films were nominated for Annie Awards, with eight of them winning at least one, and five of them received Best Animated Feature.

Alan Menken has received most of the awards and nominations in his career thanks to the Disney Renaissance.

== Academy Awards ==
The Rescuers Down Under is the only Disney Renaissance film to not have an Academy Award nomination of any kind.

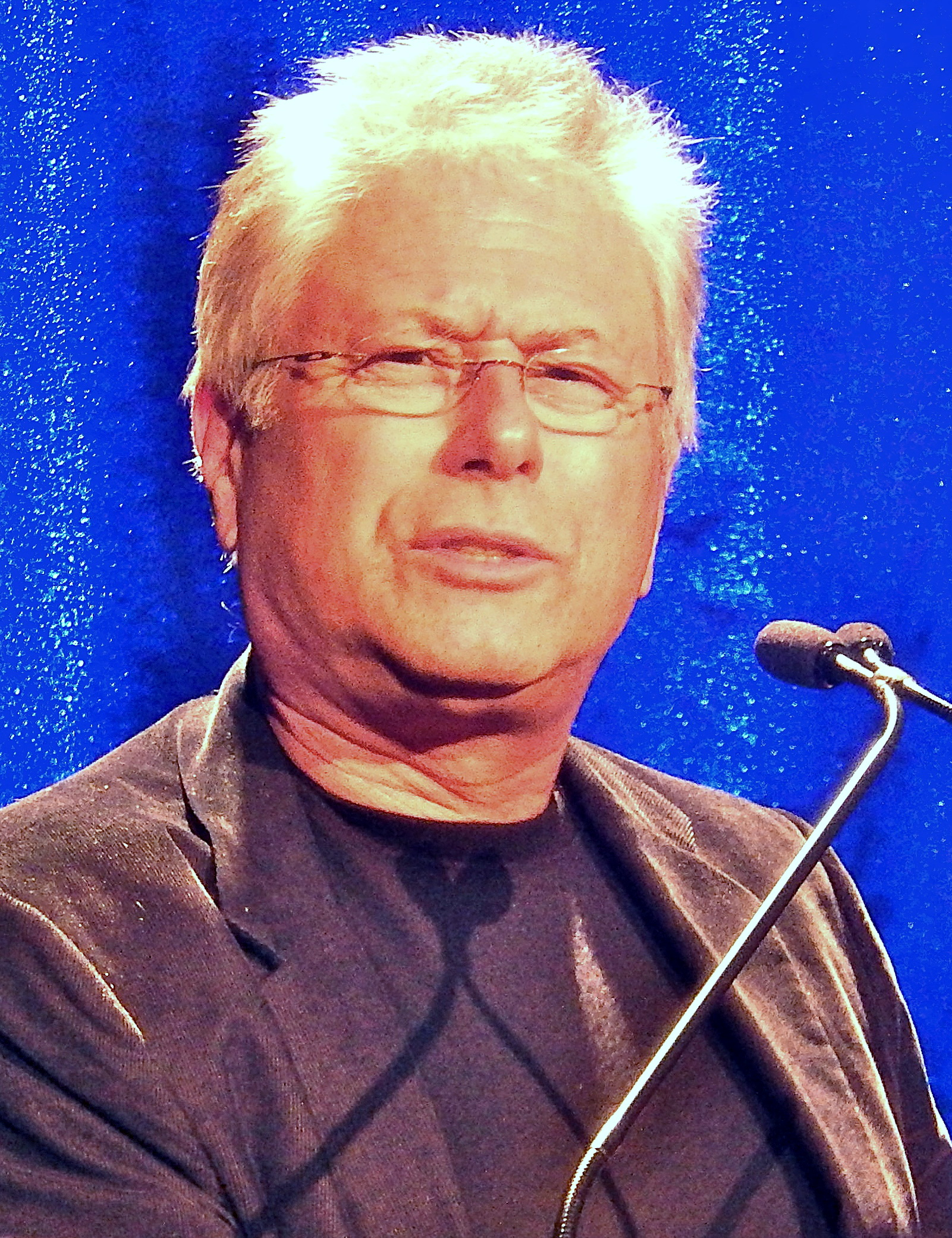
Alan Menken has received more Academy Award wins (8) and nominations (14) for his work in Disney Renaissance than any other period in his career.

| Year | Category | Film | Nominee(s) | Result | Ref. |
|---|---|---|---|---|---|
| 1990 | Best Original Song | The Little Mermaid | "Under the Sea" — Music by Alan Menken; Lyrics by Howard Ashman | Won | |
| 1990 | Best Original Song | The Little Mermaid | "Kiss the Girl" — Music by Alan Menken; Lyrics by Howard Ashman | Nominated | |
| 1990 | Best Original Score | The Little Mermaid | Alan Menken | Won | |
| 1992 | Best Original Song | Beauty and the Beast | "Beauty and the Beast" — Music by Alan Menken; Lyrics by Howard Ashman | Won | |
| 1992 | Best Original Song | Beauty and the Beast | "Be Our Guest" — Music by Alan Menken; Lyrics by Howard Ashman | Nominated | |
| 1992 | Best Original Song | Beauty and the Beast | "Belle" — Music by Alan Menken; Lyrics by Howard Ashman | Nominated | |
| 1992 | Best Original Score | Beauty and the Beast | Alan Menken | Won | |
| 1992 | Best Picture | Beauty and the Beast | Don Hahn | Nominated | |
| 1992 | Best Sound | Beauty and the Beast | Terry Porter, Mel Metcalfe, David J. Hudson & Doc Kane | Nominated | |
| 1993 | Best Original Song | Aladdin | "A Whole New World" — Music by Alan Menken; Lyrics by Tim Rice | Won | |
| 1993 | Best Original Song | Aladdin | "Friend Like Me" — Music by Alan Menken; Lyrics by Howard Ashman | Nominated | |
| 1993 | Best Original Score | Aladdin | Alan Menken | Won | |
| 1993 | Best Sound Editing | Aladdin | Mark A. Mangini | Nominated | |
| 1993 | Best Sound | Aladdin | Terry Porter, Mel Metcalfe, David J. Hudson and Doc Kane | Nominated | |
| 1995 | Best Original Song | The Lion King | "Can You Feel the Love Tonight" — Music by Elton John; Lyrics by Tim Rice | Won | |
| 1995 | Best Original Song | The Lion King | "Hakuna Matata" — Music by Elton John; Lyrics by Tim Rice | Nominated | |
| 1995 | Best Original Song | The Lion King | "Circle of Life" — Music by Elton John; Lyrics by Tim Rice | Nominated | |
| 1995 | Best Original Score | The Lion King | Hans Zimmer | Won | |
| 1996 | Best Original Song | Pocahontas | "Colors of the Wind" — Music by Alan Menken; Lyrics by Stephen Schwartz | Won | |
| 1996 | Original Musical or Comedy Score | Pocahontas | Alan Menken (music & orchestral score) & Stephen Schwartz (lyrics) | Won | |
| 1997 | Original Musical or Comedy Score | The Hunchback of Notre Dame | Alan Menken (music & orchestral score) & Stephen Schwartz (lyrics) | Nominated | |
| 1998 | Best Original Song | Hercules | "Go the Distance" — Music by Alan Menken; Lyrics by David Zippel | Nominated | |
| 1999 | Original Musical or Comedy Score | Mulan | Matthew Wilder (music) & David Zippel (lyrics) and Jerry Goldsmith (orchestral score) | Nominated | |
| 2000 | Best Original Song | Tarzan | "You'll Be In My Heart" — Music and Lyrics by Phil Collins | Won | |

== Golden Globe Awards ==
The Rescuers Down Under is the only Disney Renaissance film to not have an Golden Globe Award nomination of any kind.

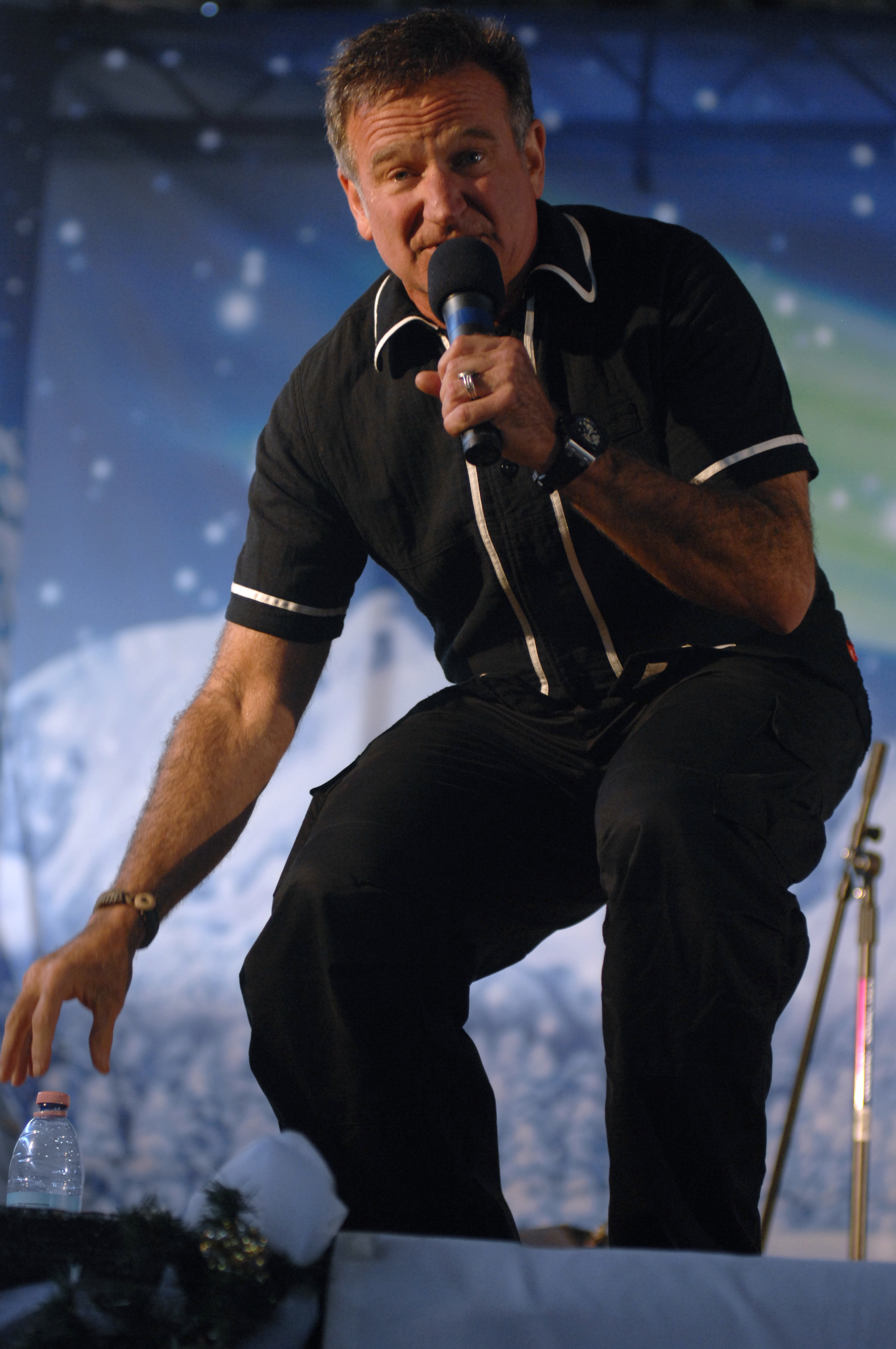
For his vocal role Genie in Aladdin Robin Williams received Special Golden Globe Award for Vocal Work in a Motion Picture.

| Year | Category | Film | Nominee(s) | Result | Ref. |
|---|---|---|---|---|---|
| 1990 | Best Original Song | The Little Mermaid | "Under the Sea" — Music by Alan Menken; Lyrics by Howard Ashman | Won | |
| 1990 | Best Original Song | The Little Mermaid | "Kiss the Girl" — Music by Alan Menken; Lyrics by Howard Ashman | Nominated | |
| 1990 | Best Original Score | The Little Mermaid | Alan Menken | Won | |
| 1990 | Best Motion Picture – Comedy or Musical | The Little Mermaid | Howard Ashman & John Musker | Nominated | |
| 1992 | Best Original Song | Beauty and the Beast | "Beauty and the Beast" — Music by Alan Menken; Lyrics by Howard Ashman | Won | |
| 1992 | Best Original Song | Beauty and the Beast | "Be Our Guest" — Music by Alan Menken; Lyrics by Howard Ashman | Nominated | |
| 1992 | Best Original Score | Beauty and the Beast | Alan Menken | Won | |
| 1992 | Best Motion Picture – Comedy or Musical | Beauty and the Beast | Don Hahn | Won | |
| 1993 | Best Original Song | Aladdin | "A Whole New World" — Music by Alan Menken; Lyrics by Tim Rice | Won | |
| 1993 | Best Original Song | Aladdin | "Friend Like Me" — Music by Alan Menken; Lyrics by Howard Ashman | Nominated | |
| 1993 | Best Original Song | Aladdin | "Prince Ali" — Music by Alan Menken; Lyrics by Howard Ashman | Nominated | |
| 1993 | Best Original Score | Aladdin | Alan Menken | Won | |
| 1993 | Special Award for Vocal Work in a Motion Picture | Aladdin | Robin Williams | Awarded | |
| 1993 | Best Motion Picture – Musical or Comedy | Aladdin | Ron Clements & John Musker | Nominated | |
| 1995 | Best Original Song | The Lion King | "Can You Feel the Love Tonight" — Music by Elton John; Lyrics by Tim Rice | Won | |
| 1995 | Best Original Song | The Lion King | "Circle of Life" — Music by Elton John; Lyrics by Tim Rice | Nominated | |
| 1995 | Best Original Score | The Lion King | Hans Zimmer | Won | |
| 1995 | Best Motion Picture – Comedy or Musical | The Lion King | Don Hahn | Won | |
| 1996 | Best Original Song | Pocahontas | "Colors of the Wind" — Music by Alan Menken; Lyrics by Stephen Schwartz | Won | |
| 1996 | Best Original Score | Pocahontas | Alan Menken | Nominated | |
| 1997 | Best Original Score | The Hunchback of Notre Dame | Alan Menken | Nominated | |
| 1998 | Best Original Song | Hercules | "Go the Distance" — Music by Alan Menken; Lyrics by David Zippel | Nominated | |
| 1999 | Best Original Song | Mulan | "Reflection" — Music by Matthew Wilder; Lyrics by David Zippel | Nominated | |
| 1999 | Best Original Score | Mulan | Jerry Goldsmith | Nominated | |
| 2000 | Best Original Song | Tarzan | "You'll Be In My Heart" — Music and Lyrics by Phil Collins | Won | |

== Grammy Awards ==
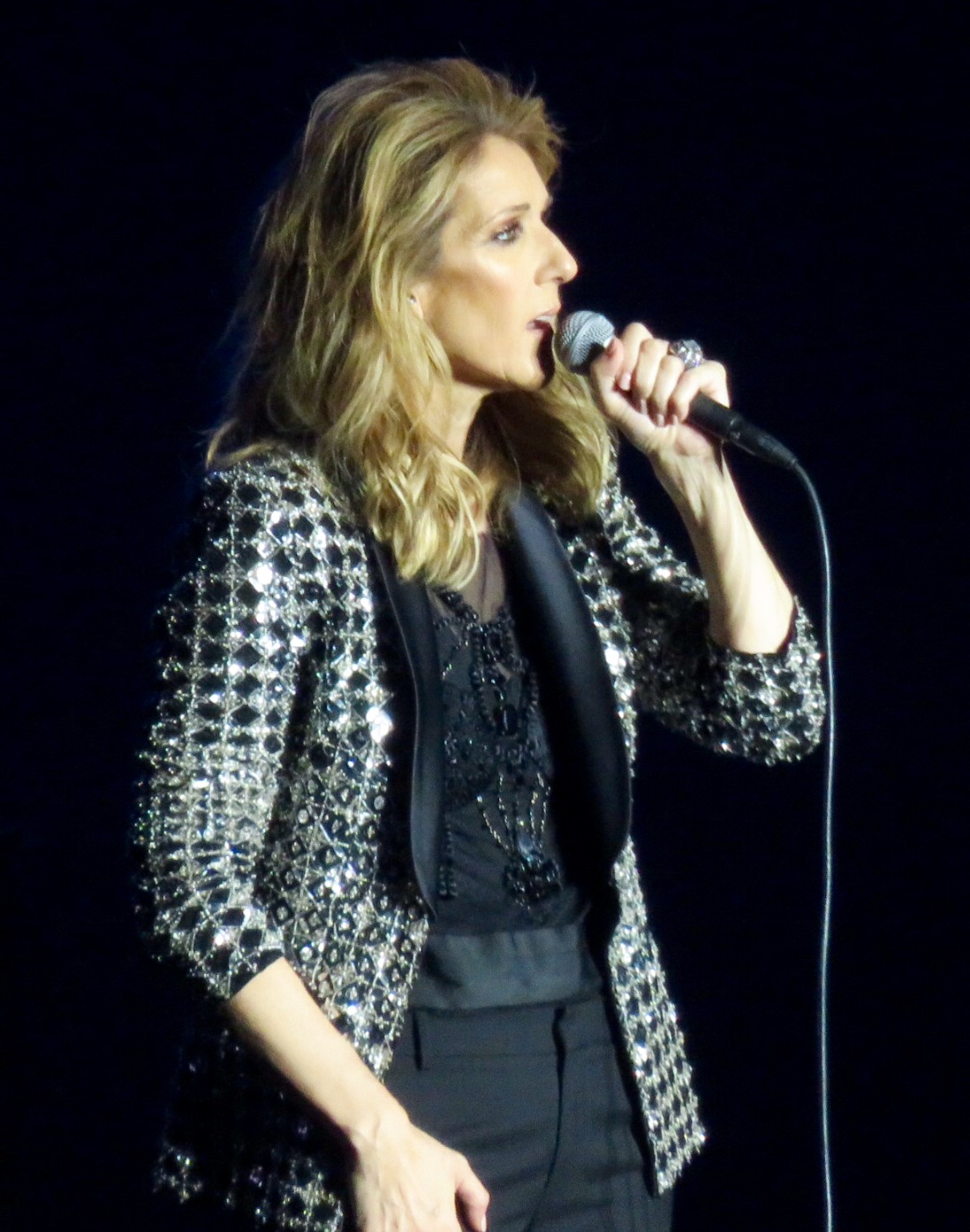
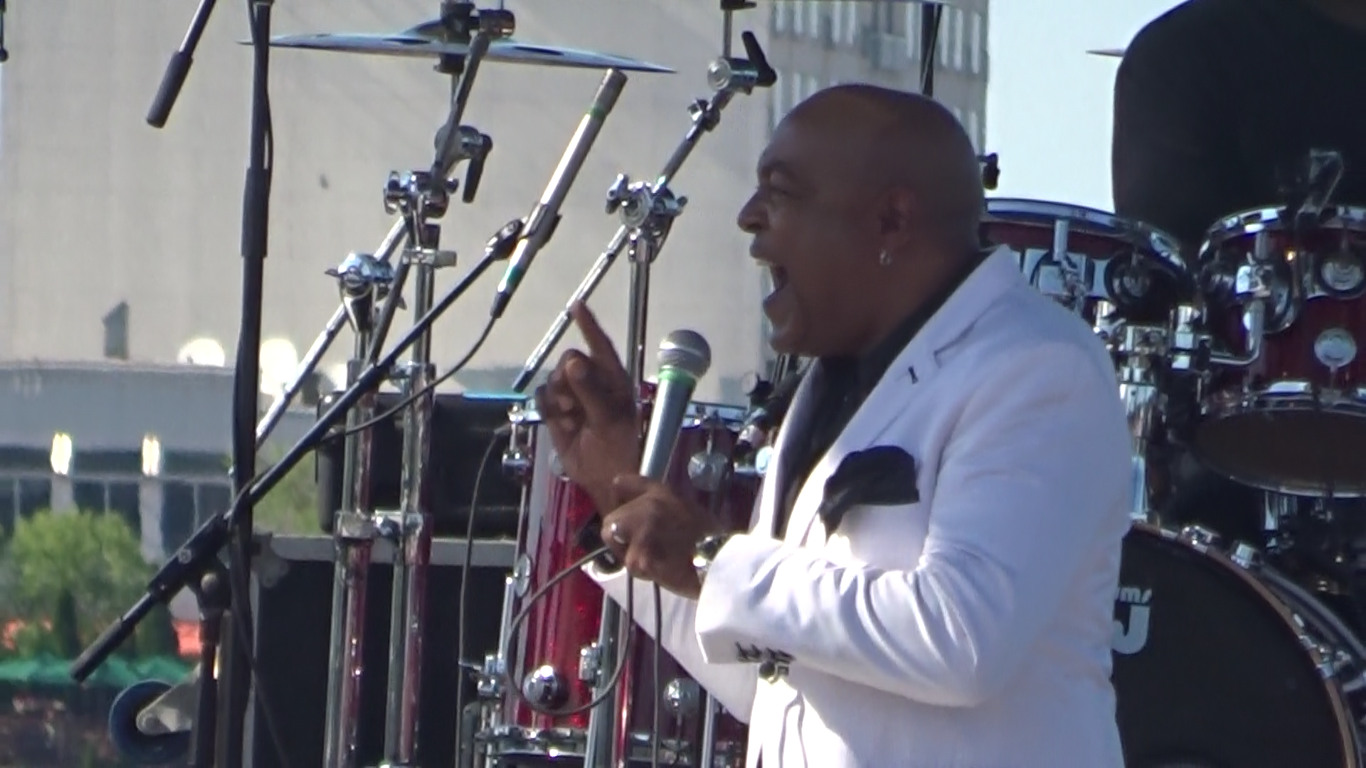
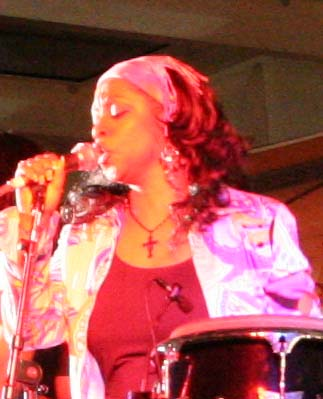
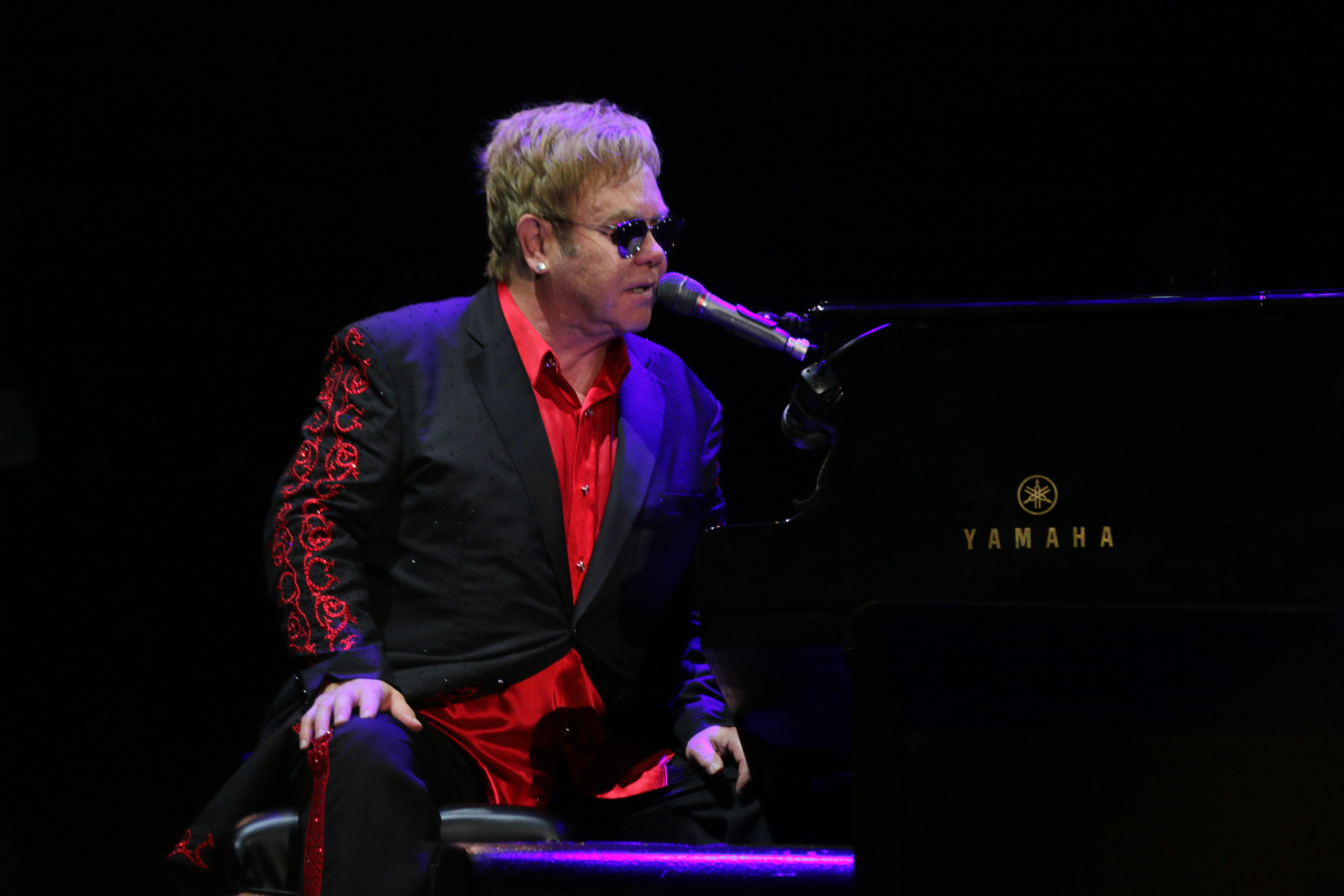
Celine Dion, Peabo Bryson, Regina Belle and Elton John has received Grammy Award for performance.

| Year | Category | Song or other | Film | Nominee(s) | Result | Ref. |
|---|---|---|---|---|---|---|
| 1991 | Best Album for Children | The Little Mermaid: An Original Walt Disney Records Soundtrack | The Little Mermaid | Alan Menken (composer) & Howard Ashman (lyricist) | Won | |
| 1991 | Best Song Written Specifically for a Motion Picture or Television | "Under the Sea" | The Little Mermaid | Alan Menken (composer) & Howard Ashman (lyricist) | Won | |
| 1991 | Best Song Written Specifically for a Motion Picture or Television | "Kiss the Girl" | The Little Mermaid | Alan Menken (composer) & Howard Ashman (lyricist) | Nominated | |
| 1991 | Best Instrumental Composition Written for a Motion Picture or for Television | The Little Mermaid | The Little Mermaid | Alan Menken | Nominated | |
| 1993 | Best Instrumental Composition Written for a Motion Picture or for Television | Beauty and the Beast | Beauty and the Beast | Alan Menken | Won | |
| 1993 | Best Song Written Specifically for a Motion Picture or for Television | "Beauty and the Beast" | Beauty and the Beast | Howard Ashman & Alan Menken | Won | |
| 1993 | Best Pop Performance by a Group or Duo With Vocal | "Beauty and the Beast" | Beauty and the Beast | Celine Dion & Peabo Bryson | Won | |
| 1993 | Best Pop Instrumental Performance | "Beauty and the Beast" | Beauty and the Beast | Richard Kaufman (conductor) | Won | |
| 1993 | Best Recording for Children | Beauty and the Beast: Original Motion Picture Soundtrack | Beauty and the Beast | Alan Menken & Howard Ashman (songwriters) | Won | |
| 1993 | Album of the Year | Beauty and the Beast | Beauty and the Beast | Howard Ashman & Alan Menken and Walter Afanasieff, producers | Nominated | |
| 1993 | Record of the Year | "Beauty and the Beast" | Beauty and the Beast | Celine Dion & Peabo Bryson, artists & Walter Afanasieff, producer | Nominated | |
| 1993 | Song of the Year | "Beauty and the Beast" | Beauty and the Beast | Alan Menken & Howard Ashman | Nominated | |
| 1994 | Best Instrumental Composition Written for a Motion Picture or for Television | Aladdin | Aladdin | Alan Menken | Won | |
| 1994 | Best Song Written Specifically for a Motion Picture or for Television | "A Whole New World" | Aladdin | Alan Menken & Tim Rice | Won | |
| 1994 | Best Song Written Specifically for a Motion Picture or for Television | "Friend Like Me" | Aladdin | Alan Menken & Howard Ashman | Nominated | |
| 1994 | Song of the Year | "A Whole New World" | Aladdin | Alan Menken & Tim Rice | Won | |
| 1994 | Best Pop Performance by a Group or Duo With Vocal | "A Whole New World" | Aladdin | Peabo Bryson & Regina Belle | Won | |
| 1994 | Best Musical Album for Children | Aladdin: Original Motion Picture Soundtrack | Aladdin | Alan Menken & Tim Rice, producers | Won | |
| 1994 | Record of the Year | "A Whole New World" | Aladdin | Peabo Bryson & Regina Belle, artists & Walter Afanasieff, producer | Nominated | |
| 1995 | Best Male Pop Vocal Performance | "Can You Feel the Love Tonight" | The Lion King | Elton John | Won | |
| 1995 | Best Musical Album for Children | The Lion King: Original Motion Picture Soundtrack | The Lion King | Mark Mancina & Jay Rifkin & Chris Thomas and Hans Zimmer, producers | Won | |
| 1995 | Best Instrumental Arrangement with Accompanying Vocals | "Circle of Life" | The Lion King | Hans Zimmer & Lebo Morake | Won | |
| 1995 | Best Instrumental Composition Written for a Motion Picture or for Television | The Lion King | The Lion King | Hans Zimmer | Nominated | |
| 1995 | Best Song Written Specifically for a Motion Picture or for Television | "Can You Feel the Love Tonight" | The Lion King | Elton John & Tim Rice | Nominated | |
| 1995 | Best Song Written Specifically for a Motion Picture or for Television | "Circle of Life" | The Lion King | Elton John & Tim Rice | Nominated | |
| 1996 | Best Song Written Specifically for a Motion Picture or for Television | "Colors of the Wind" | Pocahontas | Alan Menken & Stephen Schwartz | Won | |
| 1996 | Best Female Pop Vocal Performance | "Colors of the Wind" | Pocahontas | Vanessa Williams | Nominated | |
| 1999 | Best Song Written Specifically for a Motion Picture or for Television | "True to Your Heart" | Mulan | Matthew Wilder & David Zippel | Nominated | |
| 2000 | Best Song Written Specifically for a Motion Picture or for Television | "You'll Be in My Heart" | Tarzan | Phil Collins | Nominated | |
| 2000 | Best Soundtrack Album | Tarzan | Tarzan | Phil Collins (artist and producer) & Mark Mancina (producer) | Won | |

== Annie Awards ==
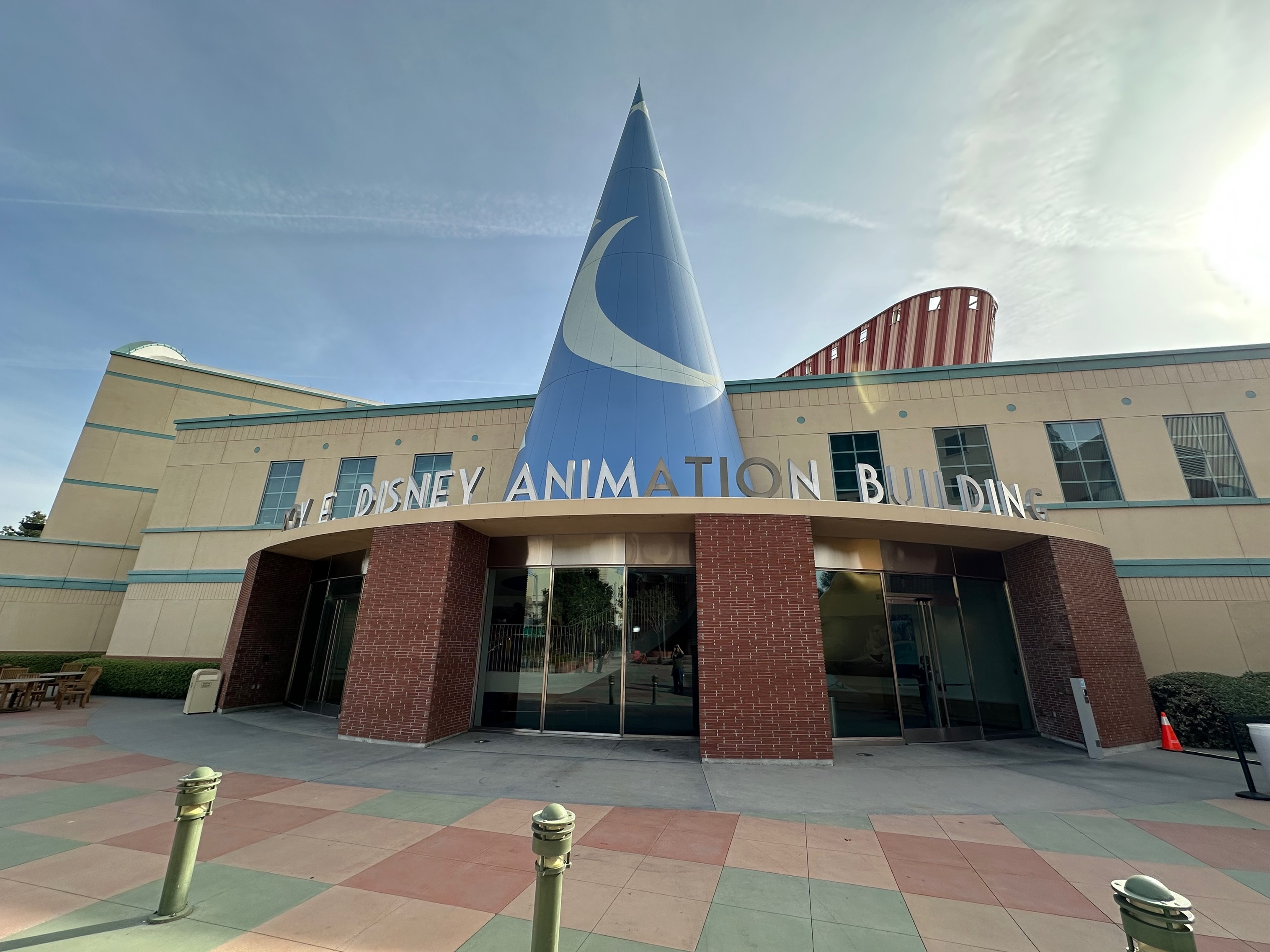
Walt Disney Animation Studios has received Annie Award for five Disney Renaissance films and has been nominated for eight films.

| Year | Category | Film | Nominee(s) | Result | Ref. |
|---|---|---|---|---|---|
| 1992 | Best Animated Feature | Beauty and the Beast | Walt Disney Pictures | Won | |
| 1992 | Outstanding Individual Achievement in the Field of Animation | Beauty and the Beast | Glen Keane | Awarded | |
| 1993 | Best Animated Feature | Aladdin | Walt Disney Pictures | Won | |
| 1993 | Outstanding Individual Achievement in the Field of Animation | Aladdin | Eric Goldberg | Awarded | |
| 1994 | Best Animated Feature | The Lion King | Walt Disney Pictures | Won | |
| 1994 | Best Achievement in Story Contribution | The Lion King | Brenda Chapman | Won | |
| 1994 | Best Achievement for Voice Acting | The Lion King | Jeremy Irons | Won | |
| 1994 | Best Achievement in Artisistic Excellence | The Lion King | Andy Gaskill | Nominated | |
| 1994 | Best Achievement in Artisistic Excellence | The Lion King | Mark Henn | Nominated | |
| 1994 | Best Achievement in Artisistic Excellence | The Lion King | Scott F. Johnston | Nominated | |
| 1995 | Best Animated Feature | Pocahontas | Walt Disney Feature Animation | Won | |
| 1995 | Best Achievement in Music | Pocahontas | Alan Menken (composer) & Stephen Schwartz (lyricist) | Won | |
| 1995 | Best Achievement in Production Design | Pocahontas | Michael Giamo | Won | |
| 1995 | Best Achievement in Production Design | Pocahontas | Rasoul Azadani | Nominated | |
| 1995 | Best Individual Achievement in Animation | Pocahontas | Nik Ranieri | Won | |
| 1995 | Best Individual Achievement in Animation | Pocahontas | Chris Buck | Nominated | |
| 1995 | Best Individual Achievement in Animation | Pocahontas | David Pruiksma | Nominated | |
| 1996 | Best Animated Feature | The Hunchback of Notre Dame | Walt Disney Pictures & Walt Disney Feature Animation | Nominated | |
| 1996 | Best Achievement in Directing | The Hunchback of Notre Dame | Gary Trousdale and Kirk Wise | Nominated | |
| 1996 | Best Achievement in Producing | The Hunchback of Notre Dame | Don Hahn | Nominated | |
| 1996 | Best Achievement in Writing | The Hunchback of Notre Dame | Tab Murphy (story and screenplay), Irene Mecchi (screenplay), Bob Tzudiker (screenplay), Noni White (screenplay) and Jonathan Roberts (screenplay) | Nominated | |
| 1996 | Best Achievement in Production Design | The Hunchback of Notre Dame | David Goetz | Nominated | |
| 1996 | Best Achievement in Music | The Hunchback of Notre Dame | Alan Menken (composer) and Stephen Schwartz (lyricist) | Nominated | |
| 1996 | Best Achievement in Voice Acting | The Hunchback of Notre Dame | Tom Hulce | Nominated | |
| 1996 | Best Achievement in Voice Acting | The Hunchback of Notre Dame | Tony Jay | Nominated | |
| 1996 | Best Achievement in Voice Acting | The Hunchback of Notre Dame | Demi Moore | Nominated | |
| 1996 | Best Individual Achievement in Animation | The Hunchback of Notre Dame | James Baxter | Nominated | |
| 1996 | Best Individual Achievement in Animation | The Hunchback of Notre Dame | Russ Edmonds | Nominated | |
| 1996 | Best Individual Achievement in Animation | The Hunchback of Notre Dame | Kathy Zielinski | Nominated | |
| 1996 | Best Achievement in Storyboarding | The Hunchback of Notre Dame | Brenda Chapman and Will Finn | Nominated | |
| 1997 | Best Achievement in Directing | Hercules | Ron Clements and John Musker | Won | |
| 1997 | Best Achievement in Producing | Hercules | Alice Dewey, Ron Clements and John Musker | Won | |
| 1997 | Best Achievement in Effects Animation | Hercules | Mauro Maressa | Won | |
| 1997 | Best Achievement in Character Animation | Hercules | Nik Ranieri | Won | |
| 1997 | Best Achievement in Character Animation | Hercules | Ken Duncan | Nominated | |
| 1997 | Best Animated Feature | Hercules | Walt Disney Productions | Nominated | |
| 1998 | Outstanding Animated Theatrical Feature | Mulan | Walt Disney Feature Animation | Won | |
| 1998 | Outstanding Achievement in Directing | Mulan | Barry Cook and Tony Bancroft | Won | |
| 1998 | Outstanding Achievement in Producing | Mulan | Pam Coats | Won | |
| 1998 | Outstanding Achievement in Writing | Mulan | Rita Hsiao, Chris Sanders, Philip LaZebnik, Raymond Singer and Eugenia Bostwick-Singer | Won | |
| 1998 | Outstanding Achievement in Voice Acting, Female | Mulan | Ming-Na Wen | Won | |
| 1998 | Outstanding Achievement in Effects Animation | Mulan | David Tidgwell | Won | |
| 1998 | Outstanding Achievement in Character Animation | Mulan | Ruben Aquino | Won | |
| 1998 | Outstanding Achievement in Character Animation | Mulan | Tom Bancroft | Nominated | |
| 1998 | Outstanding Achievement in Character Animation | Mulan | Mark Henn | Nominated | |
| 1998 | Outstanding Achievement in Music | Mulan | Matthew Wilder and David Zippel (songs), Jerry Goldsmith (score) | Won | |
| 1998 | Outstanding Achievement in Production Design | Mulan | Hans Bacher | Won | |
| 1998 | Outstanding Achievement in Storyboarding | Mulan | Chris Sanders | Won | |
| 1999 | Technical Achievement in the Field of Animation | Tarzan | Eric Daniels | Won | |
| 1999 | Best Animated Feature | Tarzan | Walt Disney Pictures & Walt Disney Feature Animation | Nominated | |
| 1999 | Best Directing in an Animated Feature Production | Tarzan | Kevin Lima and Chris Buck | Nominated | |
| 1999 | Best Writing in an Animated Feature Production | Tarzan | Tab Murphy, Bob Tzudiker and Noni White | Nominated | |
| 1999 | Best Voice Acting in an Animated Feature Production | Tarzan | Minnie Driver | Nominated | |
| 1999 | Best Animated Effects | Tarzan | Peter De Mund | Nominated | |
| 1999 | Best Character Animation | Tarzan | Ken Duncan | Nominated | |
| 1999 | Best Character Animation | Tarzan | Glen Keane | Nominated | |
| 1999 | Best Music in an Animated Feature Production | Tarzan | Phil Collins (Composer and Lyricist) – "Two Worlds" | Nominated | |
| 1999 | Best Production Design in an Animated Feature Production | Tarzan | Daniel St. Pierre | Nominated | |
| 1999 | Best Storyboarding in an Animated Feature Production | Tarzan | Brian Pimental | Nominated | |

== Saturn Awards ==
| Year | Category | Film | Nominee(s) | Result | Ref. |
|---|---|---|---|---|---|
| 1993 | Best Fantasy Film | Beauty and the Beast | Don Hahn | Nominated | |
| 1993 | Best Music | Beauty and the Beast | Alan Menken | Nominated | |
| 1993 | Best Fantasy Film | Aladdin | Ron Clements & John Musker | Won | |
| 1993 | Best Supporting Actor | Aladdin | Robin Williams | Won | |
| 1993 | Best Performance by a Younger Actor | Aladdin | Scott Weinger | Won | |
| 1993 | Best Music | Aladdin | Alan Menken | Nominated | |
| 1995 | Best Fantasy Film | The Lion King | Don Hahn | Nominated | |
| 1995 | Best Performance by a Younger Actor | The Lion King | Jonathan Taylor Thomas | Nominated | |
| 1997 | Best Fantasy Film | The Hunchback of Notre Dame | Don Hahn | Nominated | |
| 1998 | Best Fantasy Film | Hercules | Alice Dewey & Ron Clements and John Musker | Nominated | |
| 2000 | Best Fantasy Film | Tarzan | Bonnie Arnold | Nominated | |
| 2003 | Best DVD Classic Film Release | Beauty and the Beast | | Nominated | |
| 2004 | Best DVD Classic Film Release | The Lion King | | Nominated | |
| 2005 | Best DVD Classic Film Release | Aladdin | | Nominated | |
