= 24th Annie Awards =

US media awards ceremony held in 1996

24th
Annie Awards

November 10, 1996

Best Feature Film:
Toy Story

Best Television Program:
The Simpsons

Best Home Video Production:
The Land Before Time III

Best Short Subject:
Cow and Chicken

The 24th Annie Awards were given by the International Animated Film Association to honor outstanding achievements in animation in 1996. The Hunchback of Notre Dame led the nominations with 13. Toy Story won 7 awards out of its 8 nominations. The Simpsons won Best Animated Television Program for the fifth time in a row.

== Production Categories ==
Winners are listed first, highlighted in boldface, and indicated with a double dagger (‡).

**Best Animated Feature**: **Toy Story – Walt Disney Pictures, Pixar**‡; Balto – Universal Pictures, Amblimation; Ghost in the Shell – Shochiku, Production I.G.; The Hunchback of Notre Dame – Walt Disney Pictures; James and the Giant Peach – Walt Disney Pictures, Skellington Productions, Allied Filmmakers	**Best Animated Television Program**: **The Simpsons – Gracie Films, Film Roman**‡; Animaniacs – Warner Bros. Television Animation; Freakazoid! – Warner Bros. Television Animation, Amblin Television; Rugrats – Nickelodeon Animation Studio, Klasky Csupo
**Best Animated Video Production**: **The Land Before Time III – Universal Cartoon Studios**‡	**Best Animated Short Subject**: **Cow and Chicken – Hanna Barbera**‡

== Outstanding individual achievement ==
**Best Achievement in Directing**: **John Lasseter – Toy Story**‡; Frank Paur – Gargoyles; Mamoru Oshii – Ghost in the Shell; Gary Trousdale and Kirk Wise – The Hunchback of Notre Dame; Henry Selick – James and the Giant Peach	**Best Achievement in Producing**: **Bonnie Arnold and Ralph Guggenheim – Toy Story**‡; Steve Hickner – Balto; Mitsuhisa Ishikawa, Ken Iyadomi, Ken Matsumoto, Yoshimasa Mizuo and Shigeru Watanabe – Ghost in the Shell; Don Hahn – The Hunchback of Notre Dame; Tim Burton and Denise Di Novi – James and the Giant Peach
**Best Achievement in Production Design**: **Ralph Eggleston – Toy Story**‡; Hans Bacher – Balto; Hiroshi Ohno – Gargoyles; Takashi Watabe and Hiromasa Ogura – Ghost in the Shell; David Goetz – The Hunchback of Notre Dame	**Best Achievement in Music**: **Randy Newman – Toy Story**‡; Richard Stone, Steven Bernstein and Julie Bernstein – Animaniacs; Carl Johnson – Gargoyles; Alan Menken (composer) and Stephen Schwartz (lyricist) – The Hunchback of Notre Dame; Randy Newman – James and the Giant Peach
**Best Achievement in Voice Acting**: **Rob Paulsen as Pinky – Pinky and the Brain**‡; Sean Connery as Draco – Dragonheart; Richard Dreyfuss as Mr. Centipede – James and the Giant Peach; Jonathan Frakes as David Xanatos – Gargoyles; Tom Hanks as Sheriff Woody – Toy Story; Tom Hulce as Quasimodo – The Hunchback of Notre Dame; Tony Jay as Judge Claude Frollo – The Hunchback of Notre Dame; Demi Moore as Esmeralda – The Hunchback of Notre Dame	**Best Individual Achievement in Animation**: **Pete Docter – Toy Story**‡; Rob Coleman – Dragonheart; James Baxter (for the character Quasimodo) – The Hunchback of Notre Dame; Russ Edmonds (for the character Captain Phoebus) – The Hunchback of Notre Dame; Kathy Zielinski (for the character Judge Claude Frollo) – The Hunchback of Notre Dame
**Best Achievement in Storyboarding**: **Rusty Mills – Pinky and the Brain for the episode "A Pinky and the Brain Christmas**‡; Barry Caldwell – Animaniacs; Rodolphe Guenoden – Balto; Hiroshi Ohno – Gargoyles; Brenda Chapman and Will Finn – The Hunchback of Notre Dame; Joe Ranft – James and the Giant Peach	**Best Achievement in Writing**: **Andrew Stanton, Joss Whedon, Joel Cohen and Alec Sokolow – Toy Story**‡; Lydia Marano – Gargoyles for the episode "Avalon"; Kazunori Itô – Ghost in the Shell; Tab Murphy (story and screenplay), Irene Mecchi (screenplay), Bob Tzudiker (screenplay), Noni White (screenplay) and Jonathan Roberts (screenplay) – The Hunchback of Notre Dame; Karey Kirkpatrick, Jonathan Roberts and Steve Bloom – James and the Giant Peach

== Juried awards ==
Winsor McCay Award
Recognition for career contributions to the art of animation

- Mary Blair Posthumous recognition
- Burny Mattinson
- Iwao Takamoto

June Foray Award
Recognition of benevolent/charitable impact on the art and industry of animation

- Bill Littlejohn
- Fini Littlejohn

== Multiple wins and nominations ==
The following eightproductions received multiple nominations:

Nominations	Production
13	The Hunchback of Notre Dame
8	Toy Story
7	James and the Giant Peach
6	Gargoyles
5	Ghost in the Shell
4	Balto
3	Animaniacs
2	Dragonheart

Only one production received multiple awards:

Awards	Production
7	Toy Story
