= Annie Award for Outstanding Achievement for Writing in a Feature Production =

Annual US film award

- Awarded for: Excellence in film animation
- Country: United States
- Presented by: ASIFA-Hollywood
- First award: 1996
- Final award: Danya Jimenez, Hannah McMechan, Maggie Kang, and Chris Appelhans – KPop Demon Hunters (2025)
- Website: http://annieawards.org

The Annie Award for Outstanding Achievement for Writing in a Feature Production (or Annie Award for Outstanding Achievement for Writing in an Animated Feature Production) is an Annie Award awarded annually, except in 1997, to the best animated feature film and introduced in 1996. It rewards screenwriting for animated feature films.

Awards for Best Writing were awarded in 1994 and 1995, but were also rewarding animated series. The award was formerly called Best Individual Achievement: Writing in 1996, and Outstanding Individual Achievement for Writing in an Animated Feature Production from 1998 to 2002.

== Winners and nominees ==
=== 1990s ===
Best Individual Achievement for Story Contribution in the Field of Animation

Year	Film	Writer(s)
1994 (22nd)
1994 (22nd)	The Lion King	Brenda Chapman (Head of Story)
1994 (22nd)	Batman: The Animated Series	Paul Dini (Writer/Story Editor)
1994 (22nd)	Flintstones Family Christmas	David Feiss (Story Artist)
1994 (22nd)	Mighty Max	Gary Graham (Story Artist)
1994 (22nd)	Hollyrock-a-Bye Baby	Iwao Takamoto (Story Artist)

Outstanding Individual Achievement for Writing in an Animated Feature Production

Year	Film	Writer(s)
1996 (24th)
1996 (24th)	Toy Story	Andrew Stanton, Joss Whedon, Joel Cohen and Alec Sokolow
1996 (24th)	Gargoyles (for episode "Avalon")	Lydia Marano
1996 (24th)	Ghost in the Shell	Kazunori Itō
1996 (24th)	The Hunchback of Notre Dame	Tab Murphy, Irene Mecchi, Bob Tzudiker, Noni White, Jonathan Roberts
1996 (24th)	James and the Giant Peach	Karey Kirkpatrick, Jonathan Roberts, Steve Bloom
1997 (25th)
1997 (25th)	Not awarded	
1998 (26th)
1998 (26th)	Mulan	Rita Hsiao, Chris Sanders, Philip LaZebnik, Raymond Singer, Eugenia Bostwick-Singer
1998 (26th)	Pooh's Grand Adventure: The Search for Christopher Robin	Karl Geurs, Carter Crocker
1998 (26th)	Beauty and the Beast: The Enchanted Christmas	Flip Kobler, Cindy Marcus, Bill Motz, Bob Roth
1998 (26th)	Anastasia	Eric Tuchman, Susan Gauthier, Bruce Graham, Bob Tzudiker, Noni White
1998 (26th)	FernGully 2: The Magical Rescue	Richard Tulloch
1999 (27th)
1999 (27th)	The Iron Giant	Brad Bird, Tim McCanlies
1999 (27th)	Antz	Todd Alcott, Chris Weitz, Paul Weitz
1999 (27th)	A Bug's Life	John Lasseter, Andrew Stanton, Joe Ranft, Donald McEnery, Bob Shaw
1999 (27th)	Tarzan	Tab Murphy, Bob Tzudiker, Noni White
1999 (27th)	South Park: Bigger, Longer & Uncut	Trey Parker, Matt Stone, Pam Brady

=== 2000s ===
Year	Film	Writer(s)
2000 (28th)
2000 (28th)	Toy Story 2	John Lasseter, Pete Docter, Ash Brannon, Andrew Stanton, Rita Hsiao, Doug Chamberlin, Chris Webb
2000 (28th)	Chicken Run	Karey Kirkpatrick
2000 (28th)	Stuart Little	M. Night Shyamalan, Greg Brooker
2001 (29th)
2001 (29th)	Shrek	Ted Elliott, Terry Rossio, Joe Stillman, Roger S. H. Schulman
2001 (29th)	The Emperor's New Groove	Mark Dindal, Chris Williams, David Reynolds
2001 (29th)	Batman Beyond: Return of the Joker	Paul Dini, Glen Murakami, Bruce Timm
2001 (29th)	Osmosis Jones	Marc Hyman
2002 (30th)
2002 (30th)	Spirited Away	Hayao Miyazaki
2002 (30th)	Ice Age	Michael Berg, Michael J. Wilson, Peter Ackerman
2002 (30th)	Lilo & Stitch	Dean DeBlois, Chris Sanders
2002 (30th)	Monsters, Inc.	Andrew Stanton, Daniel Gerson
2003 (31st)
2003 (31st)	Finding Nemo	Andrew Stanton, Bob Peterson, David Reynolds
2003 (31st)	The Triplets of Belleville	Sylvain Chomet
2003 (31st)	101 Dalmatians II: Patch's London Adventure	Jim Kammerud, Brian Smith
2003 (31st)	Millennium Actress	Satoshi Kon, Sadayuki Murai
2003 (31st)	Brother Bear	Tab Murphy, Lorne Cameron, David Hoselton, Steve Bencich, Ron J. Friedman
2004 (32nd)
2004 (32nd)	The Incredibles	Brad Bird
2004 (32nd)	Shrek 2	Andrew Adamson, Joe Stillman, J. David Stem, David N. Weiss
2004 (32nd)	Shark Tale	Michael J. Wilson, Rob Letterman
2005 (33rd)
2005 (33rd)	Wallace & Gromit: The Curse of the Were-Rabbit	Steve Box, Nick Park, Mark Burton
2005 (33rd)	Kronk's New Groove	Anthony Leondis, Michael LaBash, Tom Rogers
2005 (33rd)	Howl's Moving Castle	Hayao Miyazaki
2006 (34th)
2006 (34th)	Flushed Away	Dick Clement, Ian La Frenais, Christopher Lloyd, Joe Keenan, William Davies
2006 (34th)	Brother Bear 2	Rick Burns
2006 (34th)	Cars	Dan Fogelman
2006 (34th)	Monster House	Dan Harmon, Rob Schrab, Pamela Pettler
2006 (34th)	Happy Feet	George Miller, John Collee, Judy Morris, Warren Coleman
2007 (35th)
2007 (35th)	Ratatouille	Brad Bird
2007 (35th)	The Simpsons Movie	James L. Brooks, Matt Groening, Al Jean, Ian Maxtone-Graham, George Meyer, David Mirkin, Mike Reiss, Mike Scully, Matt Selman, John Swartzwelder, Jon Vitti
2007 (35th)	Surf's Up	Don Rhymer, Ash Brannon, Chris Buck, Chris Jenkins
2007 (35th)	Persepolis	Marjane Satrapi, Vincent Paronnaud
2008 (36th)
2008 (36th)	Kung Fu Panda	Jonathan Aibel and Glenn Berger
2008 (36th)	Madagascar: Escape 2 Africa	Etan Cohen, Eric Darnell, Tom McGrath
2008 (36th)	Waltz with Bashir	Ari Folman
2008 (36th)	Horton Hears a Who!	Cinco Paul and Ken Daurio
2009 (37th)
2009 (37th)	Fantastic Mr. Fox	Wes Anderson, Noah Baumbach
2009 (37th)	Up	Pete Docter, Bob Peterson, Tom McCarthy
2009 (37th)	Astro Boy	Timothy Harris, David Bowers
2009 (37th)	Cloudy with a Chance of Meatballs	Phil Lord and Chris Miller

=== 2010s ===
Year	Film	Writer(s)
2010 (38th)
2010 (38th)	How to Train Your Dragon	Chris Sanders, Will Davies, Dean DeBlois
2010 (38th)	Toy Story 3	Michael Arndt
2010 (38th)	The Illusionist	Sylvain Chomet
2010 (38th)	Tangled	Dan Fogelman
2010 (38th)	Megamind	Alan J. Schoolcraft, Brent Simons
2011 (39th)
2011 (39th)	Rango	James Ward Byrkit, John Logan, Gore Verbinski
2011 (39th)	Arthur Christmas	Peter Baynham, Sarah Smith
2011 (39th)	Gnomeo & Juliet	Mark Burton, Rob Sprackling, Kevin Cecil, Andy Riley, John R. Smith, Kathy Greenberg, Emily Cook, Kelly Asbury, Steve Hamilton Shaw
2011 (39th)	The Adventures of Tintin	Steven Moffat, Joe Cornish, Edgar Wright
2011 (39th)	Winnie the Pooh	Jeremy Spears, Don Hall, Clio Chiang, Don Dougherty, Kendelle Hoyer, Brian Kesinger, Stephen Anderson, Nicole Mitchell
2012 (40th)
2012 (40th)	Wreck-It Ralph	Phil Johnston, Jennifer Lee
2012 (40th)	Brave	Mark Andrews, Steve Purcell, Brenda Chapman, Irene Mecchi
2012 (40th)	Frankenweenie	John August
2012 (40th)	From Up on Poppy Hill	Hayao Miyazaki, Keiko Niwa, Karey Kirkpatrick
2012 (40th)	ParaNorman	Chris Butler
2012 (40th)	The Pirates! Band of Misfits	Gideon Defoe
2013 (41st)
2013 (41st)	The Wind Rises	Hayao Miyazaki
2013 (41st)	Ernest & Celestine	Daniel Pennac
2013 (41st)	Monsters University	Dan Gerson, Robert L. Baird, Dan Scanlon
2013 (41st)	Frozen	Jennifer Lee
2014 (42nd)
2014 (42nd)	The Lego Movie	Phil Lord and Christopher Miller
2014 (42nd)	Big Hero 6	Robert L. Baird, Dan Gerson, Jordan Roberts
2014 (42nd)	How to Train Your Dragon 2	Dean DeBlois
2014 (42nd)	Song of the Sea	Will Collins
2014 (42nd)	The Boxtrolls	Irena Brignull, Adam Pava
2015 (43rd)
2015 (43rd)	Inside Out	Pete Docter, Meg LeFauve, Josh Cooley
2015 (43rd)	Shaun the Sheep Movie	Mark Burton, Richard Starzak
2015 (43rd)	When Marnie Was There	Keiko Niwa, Masashi Ando, Hiromasa Yonebayashi
2016 (44th)
2016 (44th)	Zootopia	Jared Bush, Phil Johnston
2016 (44th)	Kubo and the Two Strings	Marc Haimes, Chris Butler
2016 (44th)	My Life as a Zucchini	Céline Sciamma
2016 (44th)	The Red Turtle	Michael Dudok de Wit, Pascale Ferran
2017 (45th)
2017 (45th)	Coco	Adrian Molina, Matthew Aldrich
2017 (45th)	Loving Vincent	Dorota Kobiela, Hugh Welchman, Jacek Dehnel
2017 (45th)	Mary and the Witch's Flower	Riko Sakaguchi, Hiromasa Yonebayashi, David Freedman, Lynda Freedman
2017 (45th)	The Breadwinner	Anita Doron
2018 (46th)
2018 (46th)	Spider-Man: Into the Spider Verse	Phil Lord, Rodney Rothman
2018 (46th)	Incredibles 2	Brad Bird
2018 (46th)	Mirai	Mamoru Hosoda, Stephanie Sheh
2018 (46th)	Ralph Breaks the Internet	Phil Johnston, Pamela Ribon
2018 (46th)	Teen Titans Go! To the Movies	Michael Jelenic, Aaron Horvath
2019 (47th)
2019 (47th)	I Lost My Body	Jérémy Clapin, Guillaume Laurant
2019 (47th)	Frozen 2	Jennifer Lee
2019 (47th)	How to Train Your Dragon: The Hidden World	Dean DeBlois
2019 (47th)	Toy Story 4	Andrew Stanton, Stephany Folsom
2019 (47th)	Weathering with You	Makoto Shinkai

=== 2020s ===
Year	Film	Writer(s)
2020 (48th)
2020 (48th)	Soul	Pete Docter, Mike Jones, Kemp Powers
2020 (48th)	A Shaun the Sheep Movie: Farmageddon	Mark Burton, Jon Brown
2020 (48th)	Onward	Dan Scanlon, Jason Headley, Keith Bunin
2020 (48th)	Over the Moon	Audrey Wells
2020 (48th)	Wolfwalkers	Will Collins
2021 (49th)
2021 (49th)	The Mitchells vs. the Machines	Mike Rianda, Jeff Rowe
2021 (49th)	Belle	Mamoru Hosoda
2021 (49th)	Flee	Jonas Poher Rasmussen, Amin Nawabi
2021 (49th)	Luca	Jesse Andrews, Mike Jones
2021 (49th)	Raya and the Last Dragon	Qui Nguyen, Adele Lim
2022 (50th)
2022 (50th)	Marcel the Shell with Shoes On	Dean Fleischer Camp, Jenny Slate, Nick Paley, Elisabeth Holm
2022 (50th)	Turning Red	Domee Shi, Julia Cho
2022 (50th)	Eternal Spring	Jason Loftus
2022 (50th)	Inu-Oh	Akiko Nogi
2023 (51st)
2023 (51st)	Nimona	Robert L. Baird, Lloyd Taylor
2023 (51st)	The Boy and the Heron	Hayao Miyazaki
2023 (51st)	Robot Dreams	Pablo Berger
2023 (51st)	Suzume	Makoto Shinkai
2023 (51st)	Teenage Mutant Ninja Turtles: Mutant Mayhem	Seth Rogen, Evan Goldberg, Jeff Rowe, Dan Hernandez, Benji Samit
2024 (52nd)
2024 (52nd)	Flow	Gints Zilbalodis, Matīss Kaža
2024 (52nd)	Inside Out 2	Meg LeFauve, Dave Holstein
2024 (52nd)	Kensuke's Kingdom	Frank Cottrell-Boyce
2024 (52nd)	Memoir of a Snail	Adam Elliot
2025 (53rd)
2025 (53rd)	KPop Demon Hunters	Danya Jimenez, Hannah McMechan, Maggie Kang, and Chris Appelhans
2025 (53rd)	Elio	Julia Cho, Mark Hammer and Mike Jones
2025 (53rd)	Little Amélie or the Character of Rain	Liane-Cho Han, Aude Py, Maïlys Vallade, and Eddine Noël
2025 (53rd)	Scarlet	Mamoru Hosoda
2025 (53rd)	Zootopia 2	Jared Bush

== Multiple wins and nominations ==
The following nominees have earned at least two wins:

=== Multiple wins ===
3 wins

- Brad Bird
- Pete Docter
- Andrew Stanton

2 wins

- Rita Hsiao
- Phil Johnston
- Phil Lord
- Hayao Miyazaki
- Chris Sanders

=== Multiple nominations ===
6 nominations

- Andrew Stanton

5 nominations

- Hayao Miyazaki

4 nominations

- Brad Bird
- Mark Burton
- Dean DeBlois
- Pete Docter

3 nominations

- Robert L. Baird
- Mamoru Hosoda
- Phil Johnston
- Mike Jones
- Karey Kirkpatrick
- Jennifer Lee
- Phil Lord
- Tab Murphy
- Chris Sanders
- Bob Tzudiker
- Noni White

2 nominations

- Ash Brannon
- Jared Bush
- Chris Butler
- Brenda Chapman
- Julia Cho
- Sylvain Chomet
- Will Collins
- William Davies
- Paul Dini
- Dan Fogelman
- Dan Gerson
- Rita Hsiao
- John Lasseter
- Meg LeFauve
- Irene Mecchi
- Christopher Miller
- Keiko Niwa
- Bob Peterson
- David Reynolds
- Jonathan Roberts
- Jeff Rowe
- Dan Scanlon
- Makoto Shinkai
- Joe Stillman
- Michael J. Wilson
- Hiromasa Yonebayashi

== See also ==
- Academy Award for Best Original Screenplay
- Academy Award for Best Adapted Screenplay
- Graphic novel
