= Kangaroo Valley (film) =

Netflix documentary film

Kangaroo Valley is a 2022 nature documentary film made for Netflix, directed by Kylie Stott and written by Tab Murphy, and produced by Ample Nature. Narrated by Sarah Snook, the film is a coming-of-age adventure starring a nervous baby eastern grey kangaroo named Mala as she faces hungry dingoes and winter snows to survive her first year out of pouch. The film features a debut new track from Australian pop star Sia called ‘We Can Do Anything.’ It was released on December 14, 2022.

== Plot ==
In a lush valley in Australia, a young kangaroo joey, Mala, emerges from her mother Lowanna's pouch for the first time. Mala is reluctant to leave the pouch, in contrast to the joyful joey Buru, who loves to hop. King of the kangaroo mob is Bamir, the largest buck in the valley and Mala's father.

Bordering the valley is the Black Forest, burnt in recent wildfires and the lair of a dingo pack, led by the white dingo Migaloo. Migaloo's son, Miro, is the same age as Mala and is still learning to hunt. Miro chases a mother kangaroo carrying a joey in her pouch. The joey topples from the pouch during the chase, but manages to escape.

Only one in five kangaroo joeys make it to their first birthday, so Mala has a lot to learn if she's going to survive her first year. Mala's valley is home to many creatures, including the grumpy wombat Warrin, an energetic bird Willie the Wagtail, a koala, sugar gliders and many colorful parrots. A wedge-tailed eagle threatens the joeys but the kangaroo mob is alerted to the threat by the alarm calls of the smaller birds in the valley.

The next time the dingoes return to hunt, Mala is separated from Lowanna in the chaos. The dingoes surround King Bamir and he is brought down to his death. When the chaos is over, Mala finally reunites with Lowanna.

Winter brings snow storms to the valley, and food is scarce for the kangaroos. Miro is forced to leave the dingo pack when a new litter of pups arrives, and he struggles to find food.

When spring arrives, Mala and Miro are both out on their own. In a final hunt, the two go head-to-head. Mala manages to outpace Miro and escape with her life. The new season's babies all begin to emerge, continuing the circle of life in the valley.

== Production ==
In January 2021, it was announced that Kylie Stott would direct the film for producers Ari Mark and Phil Lott for Netflix. Screenwriter Tab Murphy joined the team in his first foray into nature films, a departure from his previous titles including the Disney animated movies including The Hunchback of Notre Dame, Tarzan, Atlantis: The Lost Empire, and Brother Bear, which was nominated for an Academy Award Best Animated Feature.

The main filming location was Namadgi National Park, outside of the Australian capital Canberra. Filming was plagued by lockdowns and border closures caused by the COVID-19 pandemic, and the production team secured special permissions to continue filming. The team spent more than a year filming, and captured 300 hours of footage.

== Reception ==
Johnny Loftus of Decider gave a positive review, saying "Kangaroo Valley is crisply shot, warmly told, and features a marsupial pouch full of interesting facts." Amanda Guarragi of Ready Steady Cut praised the film's coming-of-age story, saying that is what "sets it apart from the rest of these wildlife documentaries."
