= Irene Mecchi =

American screenwriter and playwright

- Born: San Francisco, California, United States
- Education: University of California, Berkeley; American Conservatory Theater
- Occupations: Screenwriter, playwright, television writer
- Writing career
- Notable works: The Lion King (1994); The Hunchback of Notre Dame (1996); Hercules (1997); The Lion King (musical); Brave (2012)

Irene Mecchi is an American screenwriter and playwright, whose prominent works include screenplays for several Disney animated films. She co-authored the screenplays for The Lion King (1994), The Hunchback of Notre Dame (1996), and Hercules (1997). With co-author Roger Allers, she received a 1998 Tony nomination for writing the book for The Lion King stage musical.

== Biography ==
Mecchi was born in the third generation of her family that lived in San Francisco, California. She attended the University of California, Berkeley, graduating with a Bachelor of Arts in theater. Early into her career, her aspirations to direct theater led her to study at the American Conservatory Theater, where her instructor, Joy Carlin, was impressed with her writing and encouraged her to pursue it on a full-time basis. She agreed.

Her first work began when she wrote a series of children's programs for Nickelodeon such as By the Way. Mecchi's first network writing assignment was on the Emmy Award-winning Lily Tomlin special, Lily: Sold Out. Her later television credits also include Valerie, The Popcorn Kid, and My Sister Sam. Along with that, Mecchi researched and wrote a play drawn from newspaper columnist Herb Caen's witty observations of San Francisco. The play was "work-shopped" at the American Conservatory Theater that led Mecchi to edit two books of Caen's writings, which were published in 1992 and 1993.

In March 1992, Mecchi began her association with Disney, when she wrote an animated educational short called Recycle Rex. The short film encouraged younger viewers to "recycle, reduce and reuse" waste materials. During the summer of 1992, Mecchi was brought on board to polish the script for The Lion King, which was pitched to her as "Bambi in Africa". Several months later, she was joined by Jonathan Roberts during the rewriting process of the screenplay. Together, both writers tackled the unresolved emotional issues in the script, and brought additional comedy with Timon, Pumbaa, and the hyenas.

Following her work on The Lion King, she co-wrote the screenplays of The Hunchback of Notre Dame and Hercules. Also, she re-teamed with Roger Allers to co-write the book for the Broadway musical adaptation of The Lion King, to which they were nominated a Tony Award for Best Book of a Musical. She would later re-team again with Allers to contribute additional screenplay material to The Lion King 1½.

Mecchi served as the co-screenwriter for the Pixar film, Brave, which was co-directed by Brenda Chapman. In June 2013, Chapman stated she and Mecchi were developing Rumblewick at DreamWorks Animation, which went unproduced. In November 2014, it was announced Mecchi was co-writing the screenplay for Lucasfilm's animated musical film, Strange Magic. That same year, she wrote the teleplay for NBC's Peter Pan Live!, in which she revised the characterization of Captain Hook.

== Filmography ==
=== Films ===
Year	Title	Notes
1994	The Lion King	With Jonathan Roberts and Linda Woolverton
1996	The Hunchback of Notre Dame	With Tab Murphy, Bob Tzudiker, Noni White, and Jonathan Roberts
1997	Hercules	With Ron Clements, John Musker, Don McEnery, and Bob Shaw
1999	Fantasia 2000	Live-action segments With Don Hahn and David Reynolds
2004	The Lion King 1½	Additional screenplay material
2005	Chicken Little	Uncredited rewrite, special thanks
2012	Brave	With Mark Andrews, Steve Purcell, and Brenda Chapman
2014	The Prophet	Additional dialogue
2015	Strange Magic	With Gary Rydstrom and David Berenbaum

=== Television ===
Year	Title	Notes
1979	By the Way	
1986	Valerie	Episode: "One of The Kind"
1987	The Popcorn Kid	Episode: "There She Is, Vic Damone"
1988	My Sister Sam	Episode: "It's My Party and I'll Kill If I Want To"
1992	Hi Honey, I'm Home	Episode: "Elaine Takes a Wife"
1999	Annie	Television film
2014	Peter Pan Live!	
