= Jonathan Roberts (writer) =

American screenwriter

- Born: May 10, 1956 (age 69) Boston, Massachusetts
- Occupation: Writer, television producer
- Education: Brown University
- Years active: 1985–present

Jonathan Roberts (born May 10, 1956) is an American screenwriter, television producer and author. He is known for having co-written Disney's 1994 film The Lion King.

== Life and career ==
Born in Boston, Roberts studied English literature at Brown University and took a summer graduate program on book and magazine publishing at Harvard before launching his career.

His first written work was on the 80s: A Look Back and The Official Preppy Handbook, which became a New York Times bestseller.

Roberts's first screenplay credit was on The Sure Thing in 1985. He later went on to write for Fast Times, in which he also served as a producer.

Roberts then joined Disney's story department and worked on the award-winning 1994 animated feature The Lion King with Irene Mecchi and Linda Woolverton.

He also co-wrote the screenplays for James and the Giant Peach and The Hunchback of Notre Dame while at Disney.

Roberts served as a producer on Beverly Hills 90210 and Head of the Class.

== Filmography ==
- The Sure Thing (with Steven L. Bloom) (1985)
- Fast Times (1986) (TV) (also Producer)
- Once Bitten (with David Hines and Jeffrey Hause) (1985)
- Head of the Class (1989–1990) (TV) (co-producer)
- Beverly Hills 90210 (1991–1992) (TV) (also Co-Producer)
- Homeward Bound: The Incredible Journey (1993) (uncredited writer)
- The Lion King (with Irene Mecchi and Linda Woolverton) (1994)
- James and the Giant Peach (with Steven L. Bloom and Karey Kirkpatrick) (1996)
- The Hunchback of Notre Dame (with Tab Murphy, Irene Mecchi, Bob Tzudiker, and Noni White) (1996)
- Jack Frost (with Steven L. Bloom, Mark Steven Johnson and Jeff Cesario) (1998)
- Dinosaur (2000) (additional screenplay material)
- Monsters, Inc. (2001) (additional screenplay material)

== Bibliography ==
- The 80s: A Look Back at the Tumultuous Decade 1980–1989 (1979)
- The Official Preppy Handbook (1980)
- How to California (1984)
