= Kathy Zielinski =

Animator (b. 1961)

Kathy Zielinski (born March 21, 1961) is an American character animator. She was recruited by Walt Disney Animation in 1981 after finishing her time in the Cal Arts animation program. Her beginnings at Disney started with working on Mickey's Christmas Carol and The Black Cauldron. After working on a series of other projects, including Ursula in The Little Mermaid, she progressed into the role of animation supervisor, working on Frollo in The Hunchback of Notre Dame.

Afterward, she moved to DreamWorks and began working with them on projects in the early 2000s. Zielinski has since moved to working on television series as a Character Animator with Encore on a series of super-hero shows and, currently, with Fox Television on the hit animated series The Simpsons.

She won the California Institute of Arts Student Academy Award in Animation in 1982 and was nominated for Best Individual Achievement: Animation at the 1996 Annie Awards. Zielinski has also played a part in the animation of multiple award-winning productions, including Academy Award winners and nominees.

== Education and early career ==
Zielinski's early inspirations for her style and themes as an artist came from media with dark themes, focusing on the designs and characters of monsters and villains. Her first inspiration came from the "Night on Bald Mountain" sequences in Fantasia. Having practiced artwork as a hobby, Zielinski took her first animation class in high school, where she was encouraged to continue into the Cal Arts animation program. She began her college education at Cal Arts in the Fall of 1979.

During her two years at the animation program in Cal Arts, she won the Student Academy Award at the school for her short-film project "Guess Who's For Dinner?" After her second year, she was recruited to work at Disney, where she later became the second woman at the company to supervise an animation project. She was initially slated to be the first, but at the time had left the studio and the role of supervising animation of LeFou in Beauty and the Beast and that barrier-breaking appointment instead went to Ellen Woodbury. After returning, Zielinski later took a role as the second woman to supervise animation at Disney with her work on Frollo in The Hunchback of Notre Dame. This work earned her a nomination for the Best Individual Achievement: Animation at the 1996 Annie Awards.

== Impact and career ==
Kathy Zielinski is responsible for returning darker styles of animation to the Disney portfolio. In both theme and art style technique, Zielinski favors a style of animation closely resembling the Danse Macabre genre. This style of animation was first introduced into this form of media in 1922 with the experimental silent film Danse Macabre at the Rialto Theatre in New York City. Due to their technical similarities, the techniques used in animation and film making, as well as acting, are often interchangeable, and much of the early influence from this Danse Macabre generation has been re-emphasised in Kathy's work.

As the industry changed and it began to become less common to stay in the same studio for prolonged periods, Zielinski left Disney to work for DreamWorks in 1996. With DreamWorks, she worked on a lot of hit animated movies until she left in 2013. In 2013, she returned to Disney for a short time to work on the Oscar-Winning movie Frozen. She then started working with Encore on their set of DC comic based live-action television shows such as The Flash, Supergirl, and Legends of Tomorrow in 2015. Currently, she works with Fox on the long-running series "The Simpsons".

== Filmography ==
=== Film ===
Year	Title	Credits	Characters
1985	The Black Cauldron	additional animator	
1986	The Great Mouse Detective	animator	
1988	Oliver & Company	animator	
1989	The Little Mermaid	animator	Ursula
1990	The Rescuers Down Under	supervising animator	Frank
1992	FernGully: The Last Rainforest	character designer	
1992	Aladdin	animator	Jafar as beggar, snake and Evil Genie Jafar.
1996	The Hunchback of Notre Dame	supervising animator	Claude Frollo
1998	The Prince of Egypt	additional animator	
2000	The Road to El Dorado	supervising animator	Tzekel-Kan
2002	Spirit: Stallion of the Cimarron	animator	Spirit
2003	Sinbad: Legend of the Seven Seas	animator	Marina
2004	Shark Tale	animator	
2006	Over the Hedge	animator	
2006	Hammy's Boomerang Adventure	animator	
2006	Flushed Away	animator	
2007	Bee Movie	additional animator	
2008	Kung Fu Panda	animator	
2009	Monsters vs. Aliens	animator	
2011	Kung Fu Panda 2	animator	
2012	Madagascar 3: Europe's Most Wanted	animator	
2014	The Book of Life	additional animator	

=== Television ===
Year	Title	Credits
2017-present	The Simpsons	character layout lead character layout assistant director
