= Russ Edmonds =

American animator

Russell H. "Russ" Edmonds is an American animator who has worked as a character animator, an animator, a supervising animator, a lead animator and a final line animator at Walt Disney Animation Studios. He worked on several Disney feature films, including Oliver & Company, The Little Mermaid, The Rescuers Down Under, Beauty and the Beast, Aladdin, The Lion King, The Hunchback of Notre Dame, Tarzan, Atlantis: The Lost Empire, Home on the Range, The Princess and the Frog, and Winnie the Pooh. He studied at the Program in Character Animation at the California Institute of the Arts. Along with his wife, Angela, Edmonds owns and directs the Edmonds Studios, an independent animation production studio in Red Bluff, California.

== Filmography ==
Year	Title	Credits	Characters
1986	Snookles (Short)	Special Thanks	
1986	Bring Me the Head of Charlie Brown (Short)	"Aided And Abetted By"	
1987	A Story (Short)	Thanks	
1987	Amazing Stories (TV Series)	Principal Animator - 1 Episode	
1988	Somewhere in the Arctic (Short)	Thanks	
1988	Oliver & Company	Character Animator	
1989	The Little Mermaid	Character Animator	
1990	The Rescuers Down Under	Supervising Animator	
1991	Beauty and the Beast	Supervising Animator	Phillipe
1992	Aladdin	Animator	Aladdin
1993	The Simpsons (TV Series)	Animator/Character Designer - 1 Episode	
1994	The Lion King	Supervising Animator	Sarabi
1996	The Hunchback of Notre Dame	Supervising Animator	Phoebus
1996	Quack Pack (TV Series)	Supervising Animator - 1 Episode	
1999	Tarzan	Supervising Animator	Kala
2001	Atlantis: The Lost Empire	Supervising Animator	Vincenzo "Vinny" Santorini
2004	Home on the Range	Supervising Animator	Rico, The Willie Brothers and Horses
2005	Kronk's New Groove (Video)	Walk Cycle Animator	
2006	Curious George	Animator: Project Firefly	
2007	Slacker Cats (TV Series)	Animator - 1 Episode	
2008	The Mr. Men Show (TV Series)	Animator - 1 Episode	
2009	Wild About Safety: Timon and Pumbaa Safety Smart Goes Green! (Video short)	Animator	
2009	Wild About Safety: Timon and Pumbaa Safety Smart in the Water! (Video short)	Animator	
2009	The Princess and the Frog	Animator / Lead Animator	Prince Naveen, Marcel and Stella
2010	The 82nd Annual Academy Awards (TV Special)	Animator - Segment "What The Oscars Would Mean To Me": "The Princess and the Frog"	Prince Naveen
2011	Winnie the Pooh	Animator	Tigger
2011	Bubble Guppies	Storyboard Artist - 1 Episode	
2012	Paperman (Short)	Final Line Animator	
2013	Get a Horse! (Short)	Animator	
2015	Randy Cunningham: 9th Grade Ninja (TV Series)	Storyboard Artist - 4 Episodes	
2019	Wonder Park	Story Artist	

== Awards ==
Edmonds was nominated for the 1996 Annie Award for "Outstanding Individual Achievement for Animation" as the supervising animator of Phoebus in Disney's The Hunchback of Notre Dame.
