= The Hunchback of Notre Dame (1996 film) =

American animated musical drama film

- Theatrical release poster by John Alvin
- Directed by: Gary Trousdale; Kirk Wise
- Screenplay by: Tab Murphy; Irene Mecchi; Bob Tzudiker; Noni White; Jonathan Roberts
- Story by: Tab Murphy
- Based on: The Hunchback of Notre-Dame by Victor Hugo
- Produced by: Don Hahn
- Starring: Tom Hulce; Demi Moore; Tony Jay; Kevin Kline; Paul Kandel; Jason Alexander; Charles Kimbrough; Mary Wickes; David Ogden Stiers
- Edited by: Ellen Keneshea
- Music by: Alan Menken
- Production company: Walt Disney Feature Animation
- Distributed by: Buena Vista Pictures Distribution (Note: Distributed under the Walt Disney Pictures banner.)
- Release dates: June 19, 1996 (Louisiana Superdome); June 21, 1996 (United States)
- Running time: 91 minutes
- Country: United States
- Languages: English; Latin
- Budget: $70 million
- Box office: $325 million

The Hunchback of Notre Dame is a 1996 American animated musical drama film loosely based on the 1831 novel by Victor Hugo, and produced by Walt Disney Feature Animation. Directed by Gary Trousdale and Kirk Wise, produced by Don Hahn, and written by Tab Murphy, Irene Mecchi, Jonathan Roberts, and the writing team of Bob Tzudiker and Noni White, the film stars Tom Hulce, Demi Moore, Tony Jay, and Kevin Kline. The film follows Quasimodo (Hulce), the deformed and confined bell-ringer of Notre Dame, and his yearning to explore the outside world and be accepted by society, against the wishes of his cruel, puritanical adoptive father Claude Frollo (Jay), who also wants to exterminate Paris' Romani population.

In 1993, David Stainton, then a development executive at Disney Feature Animation, conceived the idea to adapt Victor Hugo's Gothic novel into an animated feature. He subsequently pitched the idea to then-Disney Studios chairman Jeffrey Katzenberg. At Katzenberg's request, Trousdale, Wise, and Hahn joined the project in 1993. Murphy wrote the first draft of the script, and Mecchi and Roberts, who had rewritten the script for The Lion King (1994), were soon brought in. Additional rewrites were provided by Tzudiker and White. That same year, the production team embarked on a research trip to Paris to study the Notre-Dame cathedral and additional locations for the film. The musical score was composed by Alan Menken, with songs written by Menken and lyricist Stephen Schwartz.

The Hunchback of Notre Dame premiered at the Louisiana Superdome in New Orleans on June 19, 1996, and was released in the United States on June 21. The film received generally positive reviews and was a commercial success, grossing over $325 million worldwide and becoming the fifth highest-grossing film of 1996. Despite the film's changes made from the original source material and adding comedic elements to ensure a G rating from the MPAA, it remains more mature and darker than any Disney animated films with approach to thematic elements, including themes of genocide, lust, prejudice, sin, and redemption.

A stage adaptation of the film was produced by Walt Disney Theatrical in 1999. A direct-to-video sequel, The Hunchback of Notre Dame II, was released in 2002.

== Plot ==
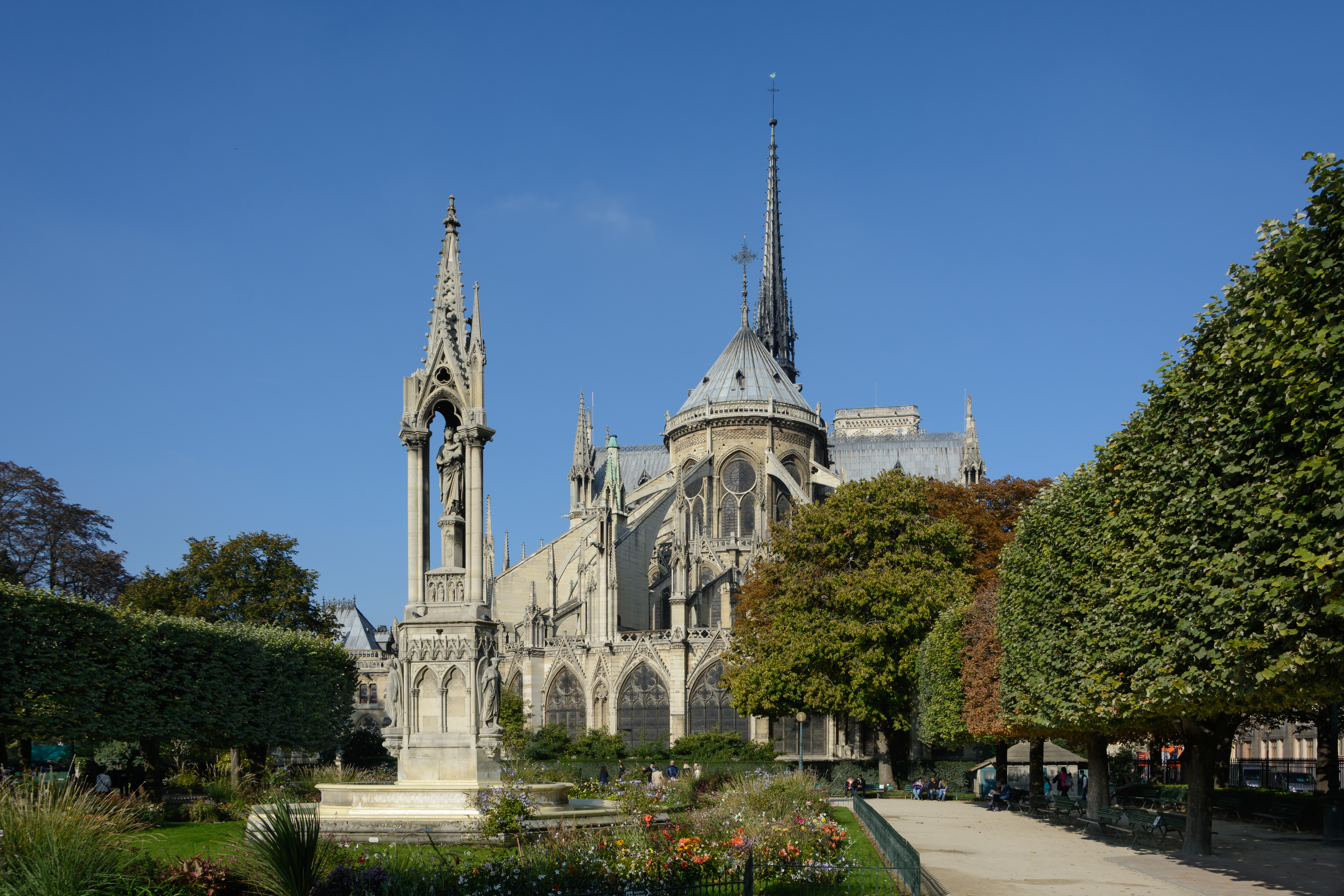
The eastern view of the Cathedral Notre-Dame de Paris, France.

In 1482 Paris, Clopin, a Romani puppeteer, narrates the story of a mysterious bell-ringer to a group of children.

A group of Romani moving into Paris are ambushed by Judge Claude Frollo, the minister of justice of Paris and a devout Catholic, and his soldiers. One woman attempts to flee with her baby, reaching the doors of Notre Dame pleading for sanctuary. Frollo chases her down and kills her on the cathedral's steps. Seeing her baby's deformed appearance, Frollo tries to drown the child but is stopped by the archdeacon. Afraid for his soul, Frollo reluctantly agrees to raise the child as his own, naming him Quasimodo and hiding him away in the cathedral's bell tower.

Twenty years later, Quasimodo has grown into a strong and agile young man with a hunched back and other physical deformities, living in isolation with only a trio of living stone gargoyles named Hugo, Victor, and Laverne for company. The gargoyles encourage him to attend the annual Festival of Fools, despite Frollo's strict warnings that the outside world would be cruel to him and shun him for his appearance. Quasimodo attends and is initially celebrated for his appearance by the crowd, but then, prompted by Frollo's guards, the celebration turns into cruelty, and he is humiliated by the crowd. He is rescued by Esmeralda, a kind Romani woman who stands up to Frollo for his tyranny. Frollo immediately orders Esmeralda's arrest, but she escapes.

Quasimodo retreats back into the cathedral, followed by Esmeralda and Captain Phoebus, the leader of Frollo's guard. Phoebus refuses to arrest her for witchcraft inside Notre Dame and instead tells Frollo that she has claimed asylum. Esmeralda finds and befriends Quasimodo, who helps her escape Notre Dame out of gratitude for defending him. She entrusts Quasimodo with a pendant containing a map to the Romani hideout called the Court of Miracles. Frollo develops an obsessive lust for Esmeralda and, believing himself to be under her "spell," begs the Virgin Mary to save his soul from eternal damnation in Hell.

When Frollo discovers Esmeralda's escape, he searches for her, bribing and arresting Romani people and setting fire to houses while trying to find her. Phoebus defies Frollo when ordered to burn down a house with a family inside and Frollo orders him executed. Phoebus flees but is wounded and found by Esmeralda, who takes him to Notre Dame for refuge. The gargoyles encourage Quasimodo to confess his feelings for Esmeralda, but he is heartbroken to discover she and Phoebus have fallen in love. Realizing that Quasimodo helped Esmeralda escape, Frollo tells him he knows about the Court of Miracles and plans to attack it at dawn. Using the map Esmeralda gave him, Quasimodo and Phoebus find the court to warn the Romani people, only for Frollo to follow them and capture everyone present.

When Esmeralda again rejects Frollo's advances, he attempts to burn her at the stake, but Quasimodo swoops down and carries her to the cathedral tower, invoking sanctuary. When Frollo attempts to seize the cathedral, Phoebus releases the Romani people and rallies the Paris citizens against Frollo's guards, while Quasimodo and the gargoyles defend the cathedral. Violating the tradition of sanctuary, Frollo pursues Quasimodo and Esmeralda to the bell tower with the intent of killing them both. He and Quasimodo fight, eventually both falling from a ledge.

Frollo holds onto a gargoyle, which transforms into an image of Satan, causing him to panic and fall to his death, sending him into damnation. Quasimodo is saved by Phoebus. Afterwards, Quasimodo accepts Phoebus and Esmeralda's love, and he gives them his blessing. They encourage him to leave the cathedral; when he does so, the people of Paris hail him as a hero.

== Voice cast ==
- Tom Hulce as Quasimodo, a kind-hearted bell-ringer of Notre Dame, who was born with several deformities, possessing a hunched back among other physical abnormalities.
- Demi Moore as Esmeralda (singing voice by Heidi Mollenhauer), a young Romani woman who dwells within the streets of Paris.
- Tony Jay as Judge Claude Frollo, the powerful and puritanical minister of justice of Paris, who, after a series of sensitive circumstances, becomes the begrudged caretaker of the deformed Quasimodo.
- Kevin Kline as Captain Phoebus, a gallant war veteran summoned by Judge Claude Frollo to assist in the eradication of Paris' Romani community.
- Paul Kandel as Clopin, the leader of the Romani residing in Paris, who is exceedingly protective of their headquarters, the Court of Miracles. He also serves as the narrator of the film, telling the film's events to a group of children at the beginning.
- Jason Alexander, Charles Kimbrough, and Mary Wickes as Hugo, Victor, and Laverne, respectively, a trio of sentient gargoyles belonging to Notre Dame. This was Wickes' final acting performance as she died a year before its release, at age 85. Jane Withers provided Laverne's remaining dialogue for the film.
- David Ogden Stiers as the Archdeacon, a clergyman at the Notre Dame Cathedral in Paris.
- Corey Burton as the Brutish Guard.
- Bill Fagerbakke as the Oafish Guard.

== Production ==
=== Development ===
The idea to adapt The Hunchback of Notre Dame came from development executive David Stainton in 1993, who was inspired to turn Victor Hugo's novel into an animated feature film after reading the Classics Illustrated comic book adaptation. Stainton pitched the adaptation to studio chairman Jeffrey Katzenberg, who began assembling the creative team. He recruited directors Gary Trousdale and Kirk Wise by informing them that composer Alan Menken and lyricist Stephen Schwartz had committed to the project; he recruited Menken and Schwartz by informing them that Trousdale and Wise were on board. Neither party was aware they were being used as bait for the other, a strategy producer Don Hahn later described as entirely characteristic of Katzenberg's dealmaking.

At the time, Gary Trousdale had taken a sabbatical break after he directed Beauty and the Beast (1991). Instead, he spent several months developing storyboards for The Lion King (1994). Meanwhile, in 1992, lyricists Lynn Ahrens and Stephen Flaherty had pitched a project titled Song of the Sea, a loose retelling of the Orpheus and Eurydice myth with humpback whales. Their pitch went into development, and both had signed on to compose songs for the project. Following this, Trousdale and his directing and writing partner Kirk Wise had worked on the project for several months until they received Katzenberg's telephone call. "The phone rang," Wise recalled. "It was Jeffrey, saying, 'Drop everything. I got your next picture: The Hunchback of Notre Dame." According to Wise, he and Trousdale believed that it had "a great deal of potential... great memorable characters, a really terrific setting, the potential for fantastic visuals, and a lot of emotion."

During the initial story pitch to the studio's executive leadership, art director David Goetz opened the presentation with the words: "14th century Europe. A dark and dreary time. A time of hopelessness. A time of—" before Michael Eisner interjected: "A time of Euro Disney!" — a wry reference to the struggling French Disneyland theme park. The remark broke the tension but regardlessly, the pitch was approved yet accompanied with a persistent anxiety about how thematically dark a Disney animated feature could responsibly be. From there, production on The Hunchback of Notre Dame began in the summer of 1993.

In October 1993, Trousdale, Wise, art director David Goetz, Roy Conli, Ed Ghertner, Will Finn, Alan Menken, and Stephen Schwartz took a trip to Paris for ten days. Three days were devoted to an exploration of the Notre-Dame Cathedral, where the team took photographs and sketched areas of the religious site, included passageways, stairwells, towers, and a hidden room. Wise remembered sitting in the nave as he listened to the pipe organ: "The sound was so powerful, I could feel it thudding in my chest. I thought: This is what the movie needs to feel like." Hahn was struck by the scale of the tower spaces: "To crawl up in the bell towers and imagine Quasimodo there, to see the bells and the timbers — the scale of it all is unbelievable." Schwartz arranged access to the cathedral before its public opening hours, climbing alone to the bell tower with a notepad. By the time the research trip concluded, the lyrics for the song "Out There" had been written there, in the character's own home.

The team also studied a collection of Victor Hugo's own watercolor paintings of Notre-Dame. Goetz stated, "It turned out that his paintings were very similar in tone to what we were coming with for our early visual development work ... We were a little tentative because it seemed like an un-Disney thing. Then we went to Paris and saw the Hugo paintings and the work of other illustrators of the time. We felt they were so similar that we were really on a track that was appropriate ... We thought, heck, let's go with it." The team also visited the Palace of Justice and an original location of the Court of Miracles.

=== Writing ===
Tab Murphy was hired as the film's initial screenwriter. Murphy's early drafts positioned Quasimodo as a Cyrano de Bergerac–like figure covertly facilitating a romance between Phoebus and Esmeralda, but this structure was abandoned in favor of a love triangle that foregrounded Quasimodo's desire and his loss directly. Murphy explained the shift: "We decided to make Phoebus more heroic and central to the story. Out of that decision grew the idea of some sort of a triangle between Quasimodo, Esmeralda, and Phoebus."

Irene Mecchi and Jonathan Roberts, who had rewritten the screenplay for The Lion King, were subsequently brought in, followed by the writing team of Bob Tzudiker and Noni White. Schwartz also contributed to the story development beyond the songs alone, including a suggestion that audiences be held in suspense about whether Phoebus would defy Frollo before he extinguishes the torch.

We knew it would be a challenge to stay true to the material while still giving it the requisite amount of fantasy and fun most people would expect from a Disney animated feature. We were not going to end it the way the book ended, with everybody dead.

— Kirk Wise

Some of the novel's key characters were jettisoned entirely. The gargoyles of Notre Dame were added to the story by Trousdale and Wise. Their portrayal as comedic friends and confidantes of Quasimodo was inspired by a portion of the novel, which reads: "The other statues, the ones of monsters and demons, felt no hatred for Quasimodo…The saints were his friends and blessed him; the monsters were his friends, and protected him. Thus he would pour out his heart at length to them."

One of the production's pivotal changes was to relocate Claude Frollo's authority from the clergy to the secular realm. In Hugo's novel, Frollo is the Archdeacon of Notre-Dame, but Disney feared that presenting an evil clergyman would antagonize Christian organisations. Frollo was therefore made a judge and minister of justice, with the Archdeacon made into a separate character. Story supervisor Finn noted the narrative problem this created: "It doesn't make any sense for him to not be the Archdeacon, because what's he doing with Quasimodo? What possible relationship could they have? Which is what led to the backstory that became 'The Bells of Notre Dame'."

"As we were exploring the characters, especially Frollo, we certainly found a lot of historical parallels to the type of mania he had: the Confederate South, Nazi Germany, take your pick," explained Wise. "Those things influenced our thinking." Producer Don Hahn evaluated that one inspiration for Frollo was found in Ralph Fiennes's performance as Amon Goeth in Schindler's List (1993), who had murdered Jews yet lusted after his Jewish maid.

For the opening sequence, Disney story veteran Burny Mattinson constructed an effective sequence that covered much exposition, although Katzenberg felt something was missing. Following Stephen Schwartz's suggestion to musicalize the sequence, French animators Paul and Gaëtan Brizzi storyboarded the sequence to Menken and Schwartz's music resulting in "The Bells of Notre Dame". Schwartz also worked closely with the writing team even suggesting that the audience should be left wondering what the outcome of what Phoebus would do before he extinguishes the torch in water in retaliation against Frollo.

=== Casting ===
In late 1993, pop singer Cyndi Lauper was the first actor cast during the film's initial stages. She had been hired one week after reading for a part with the directors, who felt her performance was "hilarious and sweet". Thinking she had been cast as Esmeralda, Lauper was startled to learn she was to voice a gargoyle named Quinn. The development team had come up with the names of Chaney, Laughton and Quinn—named after the actors who portrayed Quasimodo in preceding Hunchback film adaptations. However, Disney's legal department objected to the proposed names of the gargoyles, fearing that the estates of Lon Chaney, Charles Laughton, or Anthony Quinn would file a lawsuit over the unauthorized use of their names, so the idea was dropped. Trousdale and Wise then suggested naming the characters Lon, Charles, and Anthony, which would have resulted in the same legal concern. Instead, they would name the first two gargoyles after Victor Hugo, and the third gargoyle after Andrews Sisters singer LaVerne Andrews as suggested by Wise.

Now cast as Laverne, Lauper was deemed too youthful for a friend who would provide wise counsel to Quasimodo. At the same time, Sam McMurray—best known for his work on The Tracey Ullman Show—was hired for Hugo. Meanwhile, Charles Kimbrough was cast as Victor, who was initially unimpressed at an animated adaptation of Hunchback, but later became rather impressed at the level of research that went into the film and how the story ideas transitioned from the novel to the screen. After several recording sessions and test screenings, Lauper and McMurray were called by the directors who released them from their roles. At one point, Jeffrey Katzenberg had considered Arsenio Hall, David Letterman, and Jay Leno to voice the gargoyles, but he eventually cast Jason Alexander, due to his previous role in The Return of Jafar (1994). After a suggestion by supervising animator Will Finn, Laverne was then re-envisioned into a wiser, mature character with Mary Wickes cast in the role. Following Wickes' death in October 1995, Jane Withers was hired to voice her six remaining lines.

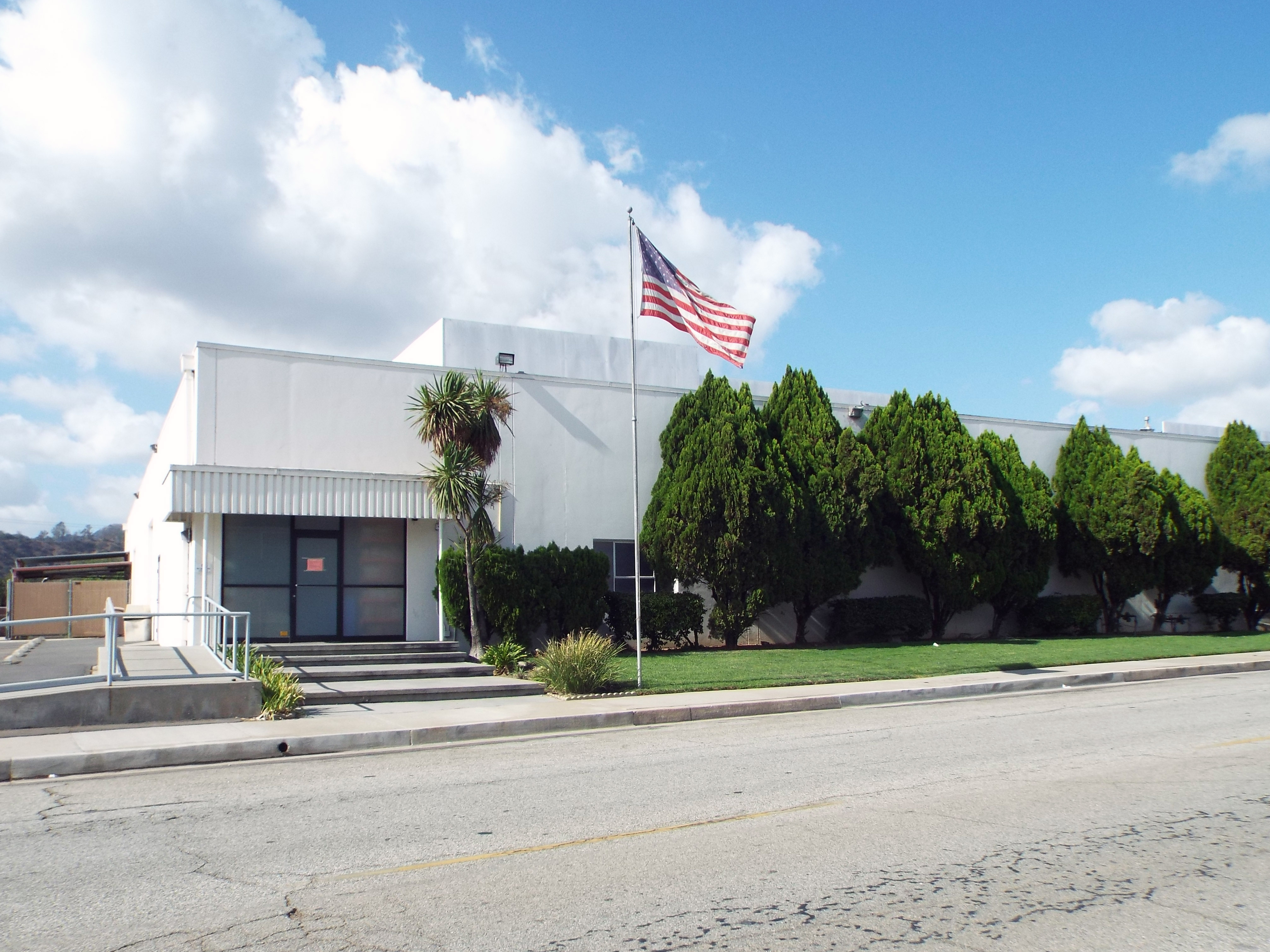
Animation work on The Hunchback of Notre Dame was partially done at 1400 Air Way in Glendale, California, which was one of several headquarters for Walt Disney Feature Animation.

Katzenberg initially envisioned the film as a rock opera and sought Meat Loaf and Cher for Quasimodo and Esmeralda. However, negotiations between Disney and Meat Loaf's record company broke down. Mandy Patinkin was invited to audition for the title role. Patinkin, whose favorite actor was Charles Laughton—who had played Quasimodo in the 1939 adaptation—sought to emulate that performance. At the audition, Patinkin brought his own accompanist to rearrange the song "Out There" to his own interpretation. Trousdale and Wise later coached Patinkin through a dialogue scene, but after further explanations of the scene, Patinkin threw up his hands and said, "Guys, I'm really sorry. I can't do this." Patinkin left and went into the rehearsal hall, where he argued with Menken and Schwartz. Trousdale privately commemorated the episode in a drawing he titled "The Patinkin Incident." Schwartz subsequently referred to it as "Battleship Patinkin." In 1997, Patinkin told the Los Angeles Times that the producers "had their own Disney needs". He later portrayed Quasimodo in a separate 1997 television film.

Tom Hulce was cast as Quasimodo following his first audition for the role, and according to the actor, he noticed during the audition that the Disney executives, producers, and directors "were staring at the floor. It looked like everyone was at a memorial service" until he noticed the floor was lined with storyboard sketches. According to Wise, the filmmakers "like to audition the voices with our eyes closed, so we see the character's face." Quasimodo was originally portrayed as older and with more of a speech impediment during the early rehearsals, but Hulce commented that "we experimented, endlessly. At one point I was ready to call in and say 'Things just aren't happening'." Ultimately, the directors desired to portray Quasimodo with a younger voice different from the previous portrayals since "[Victor] Hugo described Quasimodo as 20." Additionally, Hulce was permitted to do his own singing after performing a demo recording of "Out There".

Due to her deeper voice than actresses who had previously played Disney heroines, Demi Moore was cast as Esmeralda, and met with Alan Menken and Stephen Schwartz on singing. After several singing demos, the actress said, "You'd better get someone else," according to Schwartz. New York City cabaret singer Heidi Mollenhauer was selected to provide the singing voice.

For the role of Phoebus, co-director Kirk Wise explained that "As we're designing the characters, we form a short list of names...to help us find the personality of the character." Subsequently, the filmmakers modeled his portrayal on the personalities of Errol Flynn and John Wayne, and "One of the names on the top of the list all the time was Kevin Kline." Moore and Kline were the only actors to have the role directly offered to them instead of auditioning.

Anthony Hopkins was originally considered for the role of Frollo. An animation test used dialogue recorded from Hopkins's performance as Hannibal Lecter in The Silence of the Lambs (1991) was created after Hopkins, who had received a formal offer, declined the role. British actor Tony Jay, who declared his role as Frollo as his "bid for immortality", was cast based on his brief appearance as Monsieur D'Arque in Beauty and the Beast, which was directed by Trousdale and Wise.

Broadway actor Paul Kandel was cast as Clopin after the directors watched his performance as Uncle Ernie in the musical The Who's Tommy.

=== Animation ===
Alongside Pocahontas (1995), storyboard work on The Hunchback of the Notre Dame was among the first to be produced for an animated film on the new Disney Feature Animation building adjacent to the main Disney lot in Burbank, which was dedicated in 1995. However, most animators were occupied with The Lion King (1994) and Pocahontas (1995) at the time, and as a result, more animators were hired from Canada and United Kingdom to join the production team for the film. As the development phase furthered along, most of the entire animation team moved out into a large warehouse facility on Airway in Glendale, California. As the Disney story artists, layout crew, and animators moved in their new quarters, they decided to name the building "Sanctuary".

Since Who Framed Roger Rabbit (1988), other animators hired by Disney Feature Animation were from Germany, France, Ireland, and additional ones from Canada were involved in providing animation duties at the recently opened satellite studio, Walt Disney Animation Paris. Supervised by coproducer Roy Conli, 20 percent of the film was done there. To coordinate with the Burbank studio, the Brizzis traveled there with storyboards and conferred with the directors, animators, and layout team. Back in Paris, they discuss their animation dailies via video conferences provided by Compression Lab Industries' (CLI) video system. Meanwhile, at the Feature Animation Florida studio, which had been working on Mulan (1998), their first in-house production, at least seven animators penned about four minutes of screen time, which mostly involved Frollo and Quasimodo. The studio had also provided additional layout, cleanup, and special-effects animation.

During early development, Trousdale and Wise realized they needed crowds of people, but for this time, they wanted them to move as opposed to being traditionally drawn as painted backdrops. Recalling the wildebeest stampede in The Lion King (1994), they landed on the idea of using computer animation to generate them. For that reason, the CGI department, headed by Kiran Joshi, created the software Crowd to achieve large-scale crowd scenes, particularly for the Feast of Fools sequence and the film's climax. The software was used to create six types of characters—males and females either average in weight, fat, or thin—which were programmed and assigned 72 specific movements ranging from jumping and clapping. Digital technology also provided a visual sweep that freed Quasimodo to scamper around the cathedral and soar around the plaza to rescue Esmeralda.

=== Post-production ===
In August 1994, Katzenberg resigned from the Walt Disney Company, which in turn delayed the film's production. His resignation altered the creative dynamic significantly. Wise noted that the absence of executive oversight gave the production team greater creative latitude: "We were able to take more chances than we would have under the circumstances that we made Beauty and the Beast." At the same time, the studio's senior leadership offered the filmmakers what Hahn described as remarkable freedom at a high level. Roy E. Disney and Eisner reportedly told screenwriter Murphy: "You write the story you want to tell, and let us worry about our brand."

By deviating from the source material's darker elements, Disney intended for The Hunchback of Notre Dame to receive a G rating from the Motion Picture Association of America (MPAA). The first submission received a PG rating from the ratings board. Murphy admitted, "I fully expected it to get a PG. It felt like a PG movie to everyone, including everybody who signed off on it, from Michael Eisner to Roy Disney." The given reasons were because of a scene in which Frollo sniffs Esmeralda's hair and Frollo saying the word "sin" in the song "Hellfire". The cathedral hair-sniffing scene had been conceived by story artist Brenda Chapman and was animated by Kathy Zielinski. Chapman later noted the irony: "It's interesting, because two females were responsible for that," the production's most overtly provocative moment.

Hahn suggested toning down the sniffing sound effect and making the word "sin" less obvious by turning up the background sound effects. In turn, this resulted in the film receiving a G rating after its resubmission. Schwartz affirmed in his online forum that no lyrics in "Hellfire" were altered: "The animators did change some of the fire animation slightly to be less 'sexually explicit,' but fortunately no bowdlerization of the lyrics proved necessary."

=== Music ===
Having worked on Pocahontas (1995) for a year, Alan Menken and Stephen Schwartz were offered multiple film projects to collaborate on when they chose to work on The Hunchback of Notre Dame. According to Schwartz, they had both been attracted to underlying themes of social outcast and Quasimodo's struggle to break free of the psychological abuse of Frollo.

The film has many musical motifs that carry throughout the film, weaving their way in and out of various pieces of music, and having varying timbres depending on the action in the story at that point. The film's soundtrack includes a musical score composed by Menken, and songs written by him and Schwartz. The film's songs include "The Bells of Notre Dame" for Clopin, Frollo, and the Archdeacon, "Out There" for Quasimodo and Frollo, "Topsy Turvy" for Clopin, "God Help the Outcasts" for Esmeralda, "Heaven's Light" for Quasimodo, "Hellfire" for the Archdeacon and Frollo, "A Guy Like You" for the gargoyles, and "The Court of Miracles" for Clopin and the other Roma.

Three songs written for the film were discarded for the storyboarding process. Trousdale and Wise were not certain what musical number could be placed for the third act, though Menken and Schwartz conceived two love songs, "In a Place of Miracles" and "As Long as There's a Moon", between Esmeralda and Phoebus in the film. However, Trousdale and Wise felt the song took too much focus off of Quasimodo, and ultimately decided to have Clopin sing about sentencing Phoebus and Quasimodo to death for finding their Roma sanctuary. Menken and Schwartz had also written "Someday" originally for the film, but the directors suggested that a religious song be sung in the cathedral. The song was instead featured in the end credits. R&B group All-4-One recorded the song for the end credits of the North American English release, and by the British R&B girl group Eternal in the British English version. Luis Miguel recorded the version for the Latin American Spanish version, which became a major hit.

== Themes and interpretations ==
The Hunchback of Notre Dame's thematic concerns include infanticide, lust, damnation, and sin, as well as the belief in a loving, forgiving God. According to Mark Pinsky, it is also a "condemnation of abortion, euthanasia, and racism, and [a] moral resistance to genocide."

The Hunchback of Notre Dame was the first—and currently only—Disney animated feature to have a major focus on traditional religious faith; in this case, pre-Reformation Catholicism. In fact, the words "God," "Lord", and "Hell" are uttered more times in the film than in any other produced by Disney. The book The Gospel According to Disney explains that "it is the church... that interposes, or attempts to interpose itself between the villain and his evil intentions." During production, the studio executives expressed concerns about various aspects of the film, especially those relating to the religious content in the story, "for their failure to defend the poor and the powerless" and concerns that the story was "too controversial". Another book Deconstructing Disney notes that the studio "approached the name of God with an almost Hebraic zeal (that it should never be stated) yet here it is invoked in a manner both pious and puritan." Many of the songs were adapted from genuine Latin prayers and chants, such as "Hellfire", which uses the Tridentine form of the Confiteor as a counterpoint melody. The Gospel According to Disney includes a quote that says "religion... appears as an impotent, irrelevant caricature [and] Disney refuses to admit a serious role for religion." At one point, the archdeacon says to Esmeralda, "You can't right all the wrongs of this world by yourself... perhaps there is someone in here who can," referring either to God or Mary. This questions the power religious people actually have in making the world a moral and happy place, according to Pinsky.

The Gospel According to Disney explains that "while Frollo's stated goal is to purge the world of vice and sin, according to the opening song, he 'saw corruption everywhere except within.'" Because "killing the woman on the steps has put Frollo's soul in mortal danger," he has to take the child and look after him as penance. Even then, he absolves himself of agency in the murder by claiming "God works in mysterious ways," and ponders whether "the child may be of use to him one day." During the song "God Help the Outcasts", Esmeralda wonders if "Were you once an outcast too?" while looking at a statue of Mary with the infant Jesus, referencing the Flight into Egypt.

According to the film's production notes, Quasimodo is "symbolically viewed as being an angel in a devil's body." He is "trapped between heaven above [and] the gritty streets of urban Paris viewed as Hell." The version of the alphabet Quasimodo recites in a daily ritual reflects Frollo's view of the world – full of abominations and blasphemy. He is also constantly called deformed, ugly, a monster, and an outcast who would be hated if he ever left the confines of the church.

== Release ==
In 1994, The Hunchback of Notre Dame was scheduled for a Christmas 1995 release, though the film was reportedly delayed following Katzenberg's resignation from Disney. By January 1995, it was later pushed back to a summer 1996 release.

The Hunchback of Notre Dame premiered on June 19, 1996, at the Louisiana Superdome in New Orleans, where it was played on six enormous screens. The premiere was preceded by a parade through the French Quarter, beginning at Jackson Square and utilizing floats and cast members from Walt Disney World. Attendees included Eisner, then-New Orleans Mayor Marc Morial, and the actresses who had voiced the Disney Princesses. The film was widely released two days later.

=== Marketing ===
As part of the promotion of the film, Walt Disney Records shipped two million products, including sing-along home videos, soundtrack CDs, and the "My First Read Along" novelized version of the film. Upon its release, The Hunchback of Notre Dame was accompanied by a marketing campaign of more than $40 million with commercial tie-ins with Burger King, Payless Shoes, Nestlé, and Mattel. By 1997, Disney earned approximately $500 million in profit with the spin-off products based from the film.

=== Home media ===
The Hunchback of Notre Dame was first released on VHS, standard CLV LaserDisc, and special edition CAV LaserDisc on March 4, 1997, under the Walt Disney Masterpiece Collection label. By mid-1998, the operating income of the VHS release had accumulated to $200 million. Selling $12.5 million VHS units, it was the third-highest-selling home video release of 1997, behind 101 Dalmatians (1996) and Men in Black (1997). The film was originally planned for a DVD release in December 2000 as part of the Walt Disney Gold Classic Collection, but instead, it was re-issued on March 19, 2002, as a special edition along with its direct-to-video sequel, The Hunchback of Notre Dame II (2002).

Walt Disney Studios Home Entertainment released The Hunchback of Notre Dame on Blu-ray alongside its sequel in a Special Edition "2-Movie Collection" on March 12, 2013.

== Reception ==
=== Box office ===
The Hunchback of Notre Dame grossed $21.3 million during its opening weekend, ranking in second place at the box office behind Arnold Schwarzenegger's Eraser. At the time, both Warner Bros. and Disney already had big summer hits with Twister and The Rock respectively. In a new box office strategy, Disney also included ticket sales which were sold from Disney Stores nationwide, which added about $1 million to the box office numbers. However, the film had earned slightly less when compared to Pocahontas, which had grossed $29 million the year previous. Buena Vista Pictures Distribution president Dick Cook defended the results, claiming it was comparable to Beauty and the Beast (1991), which opened in half as many theaters, and grossed about $9 million. In its second weekend, The Hunchback of Notre Dame dropped into third place behind The Nutty Professor and Eraser with a 32% decline, but it still made a total $14.3 million and outgrossed another Demi Moore film, Striptease.

In France, the film collected an opening gross of $6.5 million within its first five days of release, which was the country's third-highest opening of 1996, after Mission: Impossible and Independence Day.

Ultimately, the film grossed just over $100 million domestically. In foreign markets, by December 1996, the film became the fifteenth film that year to gross over $100 million, and went on to accumulate $225 million, surpassing Pocahontas' $204.5 million international gross. Worldwide, The Hunchback of Notre Dame grossed over $325 million, making it the fifth highest-grossing film of 1996.

=== Critical reception ===
The Hunchback of Notre Dame received generally positive reviews from film critics. Review aggregator website Rotten Tomatoes gave the film an 80% positive rating based on 111 reviews, along with an average rating of 7.5/10. The consensus reads, "Disney's take on the Victor Hugo classic is dramatically uneven, but its strong visuals, dark themes, and message of tolerance make for a more-sophisticated-than-average children's film." Metacritic, which assigns a normalized rating out of 100 from top reviews from mainstream critics, calculated a score of 74 based on 28 reviews, indicating "generally favorable reviews". Audiences polled by CinemaScore gave the film an average grade of "A" on an A+ to F scale.

Chicago Sun-Times film critic Roger Ebert rewarded the film 4 stars, calling it "the best Disney animated feature since Beauty and the Beast – a whirling, uplifting, thrilling story with a heart touching message that emerges from the comedy and song." In his review for the Chicago Tribune, Gene Siskel awarded the film 3 1/2 (out of a possible 4) stars, describing the film as "a surprisingly emotional, simplified version of the Victor Hugo novel" with "effective songs and, yes, tasteful bits of humor." Owen Gleiberman of Entertainment Weekly graded the film an A, labeling it as "the best of Disney's 'serious' animated features in the multiplex era, (...) an emotionally rounded fairy tale that balances darkness and sentimentality, pathos and triumph, with uncanny grace."

Richard Corliss of Time magazine praised the film, stating that "the result is a grand cartoon cathedral, teeming with gargoyles and treachery, hopeless love and tortured lust" and also said "Alan Menken and Stephen Schwartz have written the largest, most imposing score yet for an animated film." Charles Spencer of The Daily Telegraph gave it a positive review, saying "it is thrillingly dramatic, and for long stretches you forget you are watching a cartoon at all... A dazzling treat." Variety also gave the film a positive review, stating that "there is much to admire in Hunchback, not least the risk of doing such a downer of a story at all" and also saying: "the new film should further secure Disney's dominance in animation, and connoisseurs of the genre, old and young, will have plenty to savor." Janet Maslin wrote in her The New York Times review: "In a film that bears conspicuous, eager resemblances to other recent Disney hits, the filmmakers' Herculean work is overshadowed by a Sisyphean problem. There's just no way to delight children with a feel-good version of this story."

Russian author Aleksandr Solzhenitsyn criticized Hunchback for "vulgarizing" the original novel by Victor Hugo, in particular by "provid[ing] Esmeralda with a happy end and blissful marriage instead of a tragic demise."

Upon opening in France in November 1996, reception from French critics towards Hunchback was largely positive. French critics and audiences found resonance in the film which recounted a real-life incident from August 1996 when French police raided a Parisian church and seized over 200 immigrants seeking refuge from deportation under France's strict expulsion laws. "It is difficult not to think of the undocumented immigrants of St. Bernard when Frollo tries to sweep out the rabble," wrote one reviewer.

=== Audience response ===
Arnaud Later, a leading scholar on Hugo, accused Disney of simplifying, editing, and censoring the novel in numerous aspects, including the personalities of the characters. In his review, he later wrote that the animators "don't have enough confidence in their own emotional feeling" and that the film "falls back on clichés." Descendants of Hugo bashed Disney in an open letter to the Libération newspaper for their ancestor receiving no mention on the advertisement posters, and describing the film as a "vulgar commercialization by unscrupulous salesmen."

Some audiences expressed concerns about whether the film was appropriate for children. Jason Alexander said that while "Disney would have us believe this movie's like the Ringling Bros., for children of all ages," he would not take his then-four-year-old child to view the film. However, newspaper publications such as the Los Angeles Times reported child audiences were unaffected by the mature content and praised the film. Some audiences criticized the film for having "homosexual undertones", noticeably with the song "Out There", being the name of a gay advocacy group and as a call to come out of the closet.

In June 1996, the Southern Baptist Convention voted overwhelmingly to urge its sixteen million members to boycott Disney films, theme parks, and merchandise, saying the company "disparages Christian values." The cause of the protests—unrelated to the film—stemmed from the company's domestic partnership policy and gay and lesbian theme days at Walt Disney World. Trousdale also claimed that Southern Baptists were outraged over the casting of Demi Moore as Esmeralda, as she had just come off of the film Striptease (1996), in which she played an exotic dancer. Disney officials would not comment on the motivation for the religious content displayed in the film beyond comments on the subject included in the film's press kit, with Disney vice president John Dreyer commenting, "The film speaks for itself."

Nevertheless, there was praise from Christian organizations for its portrayal of organized religion in the film. Louis P. Sheldon, a Presbyterian pastor and chairman of the Anaheim-based Traditional Values Coalition, said two months before its premiere: "I am thrilled at what I hear about Hunchback, that Disney is seeking to honour Christianity and its role in Western civilization. I only pray that it will accomplish much good in the minds and hearts of its viewers."

Following protests in the United States, thousands of British parents banned their kids from seeing The Hunchback of Notre Dame. In reaction to the controversy, Walt Disney Feature Animation president Peter Schneider said, "The only controversy I've heard about the movie is certain people's opinion that, 'Well, it's OK for me, but it might disturb somebody else." Schneider also stated in his defense that the film was test-screened "all over the country, and I've heard nobody, parents or children, complain about any of the issues. I think, for example, the issue of disabilities is treated with great respect." and "Quasimodo is really the underdog who becomes the hero; I don't think there's anything better for anybody's psychological feelings than to become the hero of a movie. The only thing we've been asked to be careful about is the word hunchback, which we have to use in the title."

=== Accolades ===
List of awards and nominations
Award	Date of ceremony	Category	Nominee(s)	Result	Ref.
Academy Awards	March 24, 1997	Best Original Musical or Comedy Score	Music and Orchestral Score by Alan Menken; Lyrics by Stephen Schwartz	Nominated	
Annie Awards	November 10, 1996	Best Animated Feature		Nominated	
Annie Awards	November 10, 1996	Best Achievement in Directing	Gary Trousdale and Kirk Wise	Nominated	
Annie Awards	November 10, 1996	Best Achievement in Producing	Don Hahn	Nominated	
Annie Awards	November 10, 1996	Best Achievement in Writing	Tab Murphy, Irene Mecchi, Bob Tzudiker, Noni White, and Jonathan Roberts	Nominated	
Annie Awards	November 10, 1996	Best Individual Achievement in Animation	James Baxter (for Quasimodo)	Nominated	
Annie Awards	November 10, 1996	Best Individual Achievement in Animation	Russ Edmonds (for Captain Phoebus)	Nominated	
Annie Awards	November 10, 1996	Best Individual Achievement in Animation	Kathy Zielinski (for Judge Claude Frollo)	Nominated	
Annie Awards	November 10, 1996	Best Achievement in Music	Composer: Alan Menken; Lyricist: Stephen Schwartz	Nominated	
Annie Awards	November 10, 1996	Best Achievement in Production Design	David Goetz	Nominated	
Annie Awards	November 10, 1996	Best Achievement in Storyboarding	Brenda Chapman and Will Finn	Nominated	
Annie Awards	November 10, 1996	Best Achievement in Voice Acting	Tom Hulce	Nominated	
Annie Awards	November 10, 1996	Best Achievement in Voice Acting	Tony Jay	Nominated	
Annie Awards	November 10, 1996	Best Achievement in Voice Acting	Demi Moore	Nominated	
Artios Awards	November 12, 1997	Best Casting for Animated Voice-Over	Ruth Lambert	Won	
ASCAP Film and Television Music Awards	1997	Top Box Office Films	Stephen Schwartz	Won	
BMI Film & TV Awards	1997	Film Music Award	Alan Menken	Won	
Golden Globe Awards	January 19, 1997	Best Original Score	Alan Menken	Nominated	
Golden Raspberry Awards	March 23, 1997	Worst Written Film Grossing Over $100 Million	Tab Murphy, Irene Mecchi, Bob Tzudiker, and Noni White	Nominated	
Golden Reel Awards	1997	Best Sound Editing – Animated Feature	John K. Carr	Won	
Golden Reel Awards	1997	Animated Motion Picture Feature Films: Music Editing	Kathleen Fogarty-Bennett, Mark Green, and Charles Paley	Won	
Golden Reel Awards	1997	Animated Motion Picture Feature Films: Sound Editing		Won	
Golden Screen Awards	1997			Won	
Online Film & Television Association Awards	1997	Best Score	Alan Menken and Stephen Schwartz	Nominated	
Online Film & Television Association Awards	1997	Best Original Song	"Someday"; Music by Alan Menken; Lyrics by Stephen Schwartz	Nominated	
Online Film & Television Association Awards	1997	Best Voice-Over Performance	Jason Alexander	Nominated	
Online Film & Television Association Awards	1997	Best Voice-Over Performance	Tom Hulce	Nominated	
Satellite Awards	January 15, 1997	Best Motion Picture – Animated or Mixed Media		Won	
Saturn Awards	July 23, 1997	Best Fantasy Film		Nominated	
Young Artist Awards	1997	Best Family Feature – Animation or Special Effects		Nominated	

The film is recognized by American Film Institute in these lists:

- 2006: AFI's Greatest Movie Musicals – Nominated
- 2008: AFI's 10 Top 10:
  - Nominated Animation Film

== Franchising ==
=== Stage musical ===
The film was adapted into a musical theatre production, re-written and directed by James Lapine and produced by Walt Disney Theatrical, in Berlin, Germany. The musical Der Glöckner von Notre Dame (translated in English as The Bellringer of Notre Dame) was successful and played from 1999 to 2002, before closing. A cast recording was recorded in German. An English-language revival of the musical, with a revised book by Peter Parnell, premiered in San Diego, California on October 28, 2014.

=== Sequel ===
In June 1998, Disney had announced production had begun on a sequel titled The Hunchback of Notre Dame Deux: The Secret of the Bells, and was slated for release in fall 1999. However, the sequel was delayed from its planned fall release in order to accommodate the recording of "I'm Gonna Love You" by Jennifer Love Hewitt. The sequel reunited its original voice cast, with Hewitt, Haley Joel Osment, and Michael McKean voicing new characters. In 2002, the direct-to-video sequel, The Hunchback of Notre Dame II, was released on VHS and DVD.

=== Live-action remake ===
A live-action remake of The Hunchback of Notre Dame was announced in January 2019. The script was set to be penned by David Henry Hwang with Menken and Schwartz returning to write the music. Josh Gad, David Hoberman, and Todd Lieberman were set to produce, with Gad being possibly considered to play Quasimodo. The film, titled Hunchback, would draw elements from both the animated film and Hugo's novel. In January 2021, Gad stated that the project was still in the works and that he and the studio were "getting closer" to making it happen.

In May 2023, Menken suggested that development on the live-action remake had stalled owing to the original film's content and themes: "It's a tough one, because the Hunchback movie, Hunchback story involves a lot of real, real issues that are important issues and should be explored to be discussed. And there has to be an agreement about how we deal with those issues. You know, do we do a Hunchback without 'Hellfire'? I don't think so ... So it sits in this limbo right now."

=== Video games ===
In 1996, a tie-in game entitled The Hunchback of Notre Dame: Topsy Turvy Games was released by Disney Interactive for the PC and the Nintendo Game Boy, which is a collection of mini games based around the Festival of Fools that includes a variation of Balloon Fight.

La Cité des Cloches (lit. The City of Bells), a world based on The Hunchback of Notre Dame, appears in Kingdom Hearts 3D: Dream Drop Distance.

In 2022, content of the film was made available within the Disney Magic Kingdoms game by Gameloft, introduced in a limited time event with a storyline that takes place after the events of the film.

=== Other media ===
Characters from The Hunchback of Notre Dame make occasional appearances at the Disney Parks and Resorts. Clopin's Music Box is a small attraction based on the film in Fantasyland at Disneyland and Hong Kong Disneyland has the Clopin's Festival of Foods restaurant.

Quasimodo, Esmeralda, Victor, Hugo, Laverne and Frollo all made guest appearances on the television series House of Mouse. Frollo could also be seen amongst a crowd of Disney villains in the direct-to-video film Mickey's House of Villains.

== Bibliography ==
- de Giere, Carol (2008). Defying Gravity: The Creative Career of Stephen Schwartz from Godspell to Wicked. Applause Theatre & Cinema Books. ISBN 978-1-55783-745-5.
- Laird, Paul (2014). The Musical Theater of Stephen Schwartz: From Godspell to Wicked and Beyond. Rowman & Littlefield. ISBN 978-0-8108-9191-3.
- Norman, Floyd (2013). Animated Life: A Lifetime of Tips, Tricks, Techniques and Stories from a Disney Legend. Focal Press. ISBN 978-0-240-81805-4.
- Thomas, Bob (1997). Disney's Art of Animation: From Mickey Mouse To Hercules. New York: Hyperion. ISBN 978-0-7868-6241-2.
- Robello, Stephen (1996). The Art of The Hunchback of Notre Dame. New York: Hyperion. ISBN 978-0-7868-6208-5.
