= Tab Murphy =

American screenwriter

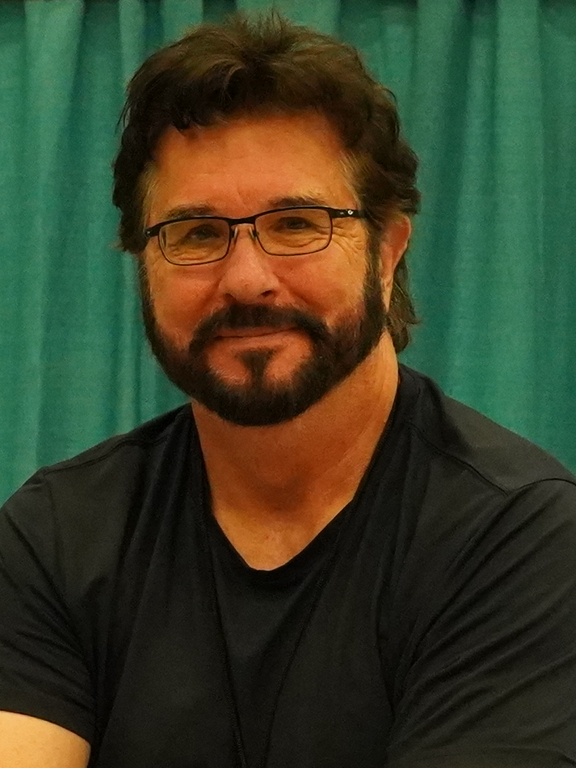
- Murphy at GalaxyCon Austin in 2023
- Born: Tacoma, Washington, U.S.
- Occupations: Screenwriter, film producer, film director
- Writing career
- Years active: 1987–present

Tab Murphy is an American screenwriter, film producer, and film director.

== Biography ==
Murphy's theatrical debut, Gorillas in the Mist, was nominated for an Academy Award for his writing. In 1995, Murphy made his directorial debut with Last of the Dogmen and wrote the feature. Afterwards, Murphy has spent nearly ten years with The Walt Disney Company writing The Hunchback of Notre Dame in 1996, Tarzan in 1999, Atlantis: The Lost Empire in 2001, and Brother Bear in 2003. During his time with Disney, he was hired by TriStar Pictures to write a treatment to a planned sequel to the 1998 film Godzilla. But due to negative reviews from critics and audiences alike, the planned sequel was cancelled. After working with Disney for a few years, he then left the company in 2006 and went to work at Warner Bros. Animation for a couple years. His work includes Superman/Batman: Apocalypse and Batman: Year One, and he wrote several episodes for the 2011 Thundercats reboot, Teen Titans Go! and Be Cool, Scooby-Doo!. While at Warner Bros., Murphy wrote the direct-to-video 3D thriller film Dark Country for Sony Pictures and Stage 6 Films, based on a short story written by Murphy, and directed by Thomas Jane. He was attached to write an animated feature directed by Kirk Wise called Galaxy Gas, and a TV pilot that was sold to Legendary Pictures. Towards the end of the 2010s, Murphy became involved as a writer of two crowdsourced short films: The Haunted Swordsman and The Passengers, based on the Stephen King short story Rest Stop. In June 2020, Murphy became attached to write a reimagining of the 1980 horror film The Changeling.

== Filmography ==
Title	Year	Role
My Best Friend Is a Vampire	1987	Screenwriter, associate producer
Gorillas in the Mist	1988	Story
Last of the Dogmen	1995	Director, screenwriter
The Hunchback of Notre Dame	1996	Screenwriter, animation story
Tarzan	1999	Screenwriter
Atlantis: The Lost Empire	2001	Screenwriter, story
The Making of Atlantis: The Lost Empire	2002	Himself, special thanks
Brother Bear	2003	Screenwriter
Dark Country	2009	Screenwriter
Superman/Batman: Apocalypse	2010	Screenwriter
Batman: Year One	2011	Screenwriter
Thundercats	2011-2012	Teleplay (7 episodes)
Teen Titans Go!	2013	Writer: story, teleplay (2 episodes)
Road to Slipstream	2014	Special thanks
Be Cool, Scooby-Doo!	2016, 2017	Writer: story, teleplay (2 episode)
The Haunted Swordsman	2019	Short film; writer
The Passenger	2020	Short film; writer
Bobbleheads The Movie	2020	Story
Kangaroo Valley	2022	Documentary; screenwriter
The Changeling	TBA	Screenwriter

=== Unproduced Features ===
- Godzilla 2 (1999)
- Beijing Safari (2012)
- Untitled China Project
- Galaxy Gas

== Bibliography ==
Year	Title	Notes
2005	Untitled Short Story	This short story was discovered by Dark Country's director Thomas Jane for Murphy to write the film.
2012	Dark Country	Digital graphic novel, based on Murphy's script

== Collaborators ==
- The Walt Disney Company: The Hunchback of Notre Dame, Tarzan, Atlantis: The Lost Empire, Brother Bear (writer)
- Warner Bros.: Gorillas in The Mist, Batman: Year One, Batman/Superman: Apocalypse, Thundercats, Teen Titans Go, Be Cool, Scooby-Doo! (writer)

== Award nominations ==
- 1989 Academy Awards - Best Screenplay Based on Material From Another Medium for Gorillas in the Mist)
- 1989 WGA Award - Best Screenplay Based on Material from Another Medium (for Gorillas in the Mist)
- 1997 Golden Raspberry Award - Worst Written Film Grossing Over $100 Million (for The Hunchback of Notre Dame)
- 1999 Annie Awards - Outstanding Individual Achievement for Writing in an Animated Feature Production (for Tarzan)
- 2003 Annie Awards - Outstanding Writing in an Animated Feature Production (for Brother Bear)
