= Bob Tzudiker =

American screenwriter and actor (born 1953)

- Born: August 28, 1953 (age 71); Boston, Massachusetts, U.S.
- Education: St. John's College
- Occupation(s): Screenwriter, actor
- Notable work: Newsies (1992); The Hunchback of Notre Dame (1996); Anastasia (1997); Tarzan (1999); 102 Dalmatians (2000); Tarzan II (2005)
- Partner: Noni White

Robert "Bob" Tzudiker (born August 28, 1953) is an American screenwriter and actor. Tzudiker is best known for co-creating and writing the screenplay for Newsies along with his wife Noni White, which was based on the real-life Newsboys' strike of 1899. Newsies began as a "classic underdog story ripped from the history books", with writers White and Tzudiker approaching producer Michael Finnell with an idea for a nonmusical drama; however, Disney studio head Jeffrey Katzenberg redirected the project to become a musical.

He shares writing credit on The Hunchback of Notre Dame (1996), Anastasia (1997), Tarzan (1999), and 102 Dalmatians (2000). He also contributed to the film The Lion King (1994) and has written screenplays for every major studio.

The stage version of Newsies opened on Broadway on March 29, 2012, and closed on August 24, 2014, grossing over $100 million. The 2017 three-day cinema showing of Disney's Newsies: The Broadway Musical! broke ticketing records to become the highest-grossing Broadway event to date from Fathom Events.

He is a member of the writers' branch of the Academy of Motion Picture Arts and Sciences. He received several nominations for the Annie Award for Writing in a Feature Production.

He is currently an adjunct professor of screenwriting at the John Wells Division of Writing for Screen & Television at USC Cinematic Arts.

Prior to writing, Tzudiker worked as an actor, appearing in Total Recall, Ruthless People and Hill Street Blues, among many others. He is a graduate of St. John's College in Annapolis, MD.

== Awards and nominations ==
Year	Award	Category	Nominated work	Result
1997	Annie Award	Outstanding Individual Achievement for Writing in an Animated Feature Production	Anastasia	Nominated
1999	Annie Award	Outstanding Individual Achievement for Writing in an Animated Feature Production	Tarzan	Nominated
2006	DVD Exclusive Awards	Best Screenplay (for a DVD Premiere Movie)	Tarzan II	Nominated
