= Brenda Chapman =

American filmmaker (born 1962 or 1963)

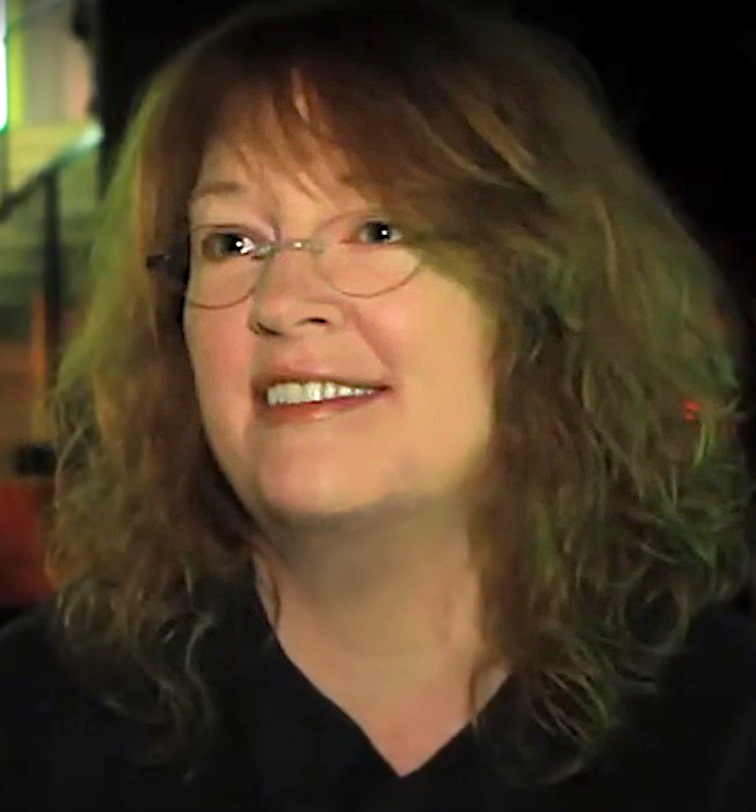
- Chapman at JDIFF 2012
- Born: 1962 or 1963 (age 63–64); Beason, Illinois, U.S.
- Education: California Institute of the Arts
- Occupations: Animator; director; screenwriter; storyboard artist
- Years active: 1987–present
- Employers: Walt Disney Animation Studios (1988–1999); DreamWorks Animation (1994–2003); Pixar Animation Studios (2003–2012)
- Notable work: Beauty and the Beast; Brave; The Lion King; The Little Mermaid; The Prince of Egypt
- Spouse: Kevin Lima (m. 1982)
- Children: 1
- Awards: Academy Award for Best Animated Feature; Brave (2012)

Brenda Chapman (born 1962 or 1963) is an American animator, screenwriter, storyboard artist, and director. In 1998, she became the first woman to direct an animated feature from a major studio, DreamWorks Animation's The Prince of Egypt. In 2012, she directed the Disney/Pixar film Brave with Mark Andrews (and co-direction from Steve Purcell), becoming the first woman to win the Academy Award for Best Animated Feature.

== Early life ==
Chapman was born in Beason, Illinois as the youngest of five. She went to Lincoln College in Lincoln, Illinois, receiving her Associate of Arts degree. She then moved to California and studied animation at the California Institute of the Arts (CalArts).

== Career ==
During her summer breaks, Chapman began her professional career working in syndicated television animation. In 1987, she graduated with a BFA in character animation, and was hired as a story trainee on The Little Mermaid (1989). Chapman then worked as a storyboard artist on The Rescuers Down Under (1990) and Beauty and the Beast (1991), where she worked closely with Roger Allers to define many of the key sequences and motifs used in the film. She later served as head of story, the first woman to do so in an animated feature film, for The Lion King (1994).

Chapman joined DreamWorks Animation at its inception in the fall of 1994. Chapman was one of a team of three directors who worked on 1998's The Prince of Egypt, along with Steve Hickner and Simon Wells. She became the first female director for an animated feature by a major studio; three others had previously helmed independent efforts including Lotte Reiniger of The Adventures of Prince Achmed (1926), Joy Batchelor of Animal Farm (1954), and Arna Selznick of The Care Bears Movie (1985). She also worked on Chicken Run, and several projects in development while at DreamWorks before leaving the studio on maternity leave. In May 2003, Chapman and Allers were announced to direct Tam Lin, an adaptation of the Scottish folk ballad, for Sony Pictures Animation.

However, later that same year, Chapman moved to Pixar after being invited by her old colleague Joe Ranft, where she had a brief stint on Cars (2006) before developing The Bear and the Bow, which was re-titled Brave (2012). In April 2008, Chapman was announced as the director of the film, making her Pixar's first female director. In October 2010, however, she was replaced by Mark Andrews following creative disagreements between her and John Lasseter. There were rumors that she subsequently left Pixar, but she remained on staff until shortly after the film's release. In 2012, Chapman's work in Brave won her an Academy Award, BAFTA, and Golden Globe for Best Animated Feature Film, making her the first woman to win this category. By July 2012, Chapman worked as a consultant at Lucasfilm Animation, helping to resolve story problems on Strange Magic (2015). When asked whether she will return to Pixar, Chapman responded by saying she has no desire to go back there feeling that "[t]he atmosphere and the leadership doesn't fit well with me."

In 2013, she returned to DreamWorks Animation, where she helped in developing Rumblewick that had a strong female protagonist and was described as "funny with magic and heart." Chapman then left DreamWorks shortly afterwards. As of 2016, she began developing projects for Chapman Lima Productions, with her husband Kevin Lima.

In May 2016, it was reported that Chapman would make her live-action directorial debut with Come Away (2020), a fantasy drama that serves as a prequel to Alice in Wonderland and Peter Pan. In May 2018, it was reported that Angelina Jolie and David Oyelowo were portraying the parents of Alice and Peter, with both actors also serving as producers. Anna Chancellor and Clarke Peters joined the cast in August, with filming in London starting that same month.

In February 2020, it was reported that Chapman was attached to write and direct a live-action hybrid film adaptation of Ghost Squad. In December of that year, Chapman stated she had "kind of stepped away" from the project, deciding instead to work on other projects with Lima. She also stated she was writing "a novel and thinking about turning it into an animated screenplay."

== Personal life ==
Chapman is married to director Kevin Lima (A Goofy Movie, Tarzan, Enchanted), whom she met at California Institute of the Arts. They have a daughter, Emma Rose Lima (b. 1999), who was the inspiration for Mérida, Brave's young princess. Emma has also been featured as a voice actress for Disney movies such as Bambi II and Enchanted. They reside in Tamalpais Valley, California. Chapman is of Scottish ancestry. In 2014, Chapman urged Scots to back independence in the September referendum.

== Filmography ==
=== Feature films ===
Year	Title	Director	Writer	Story Artist	Other	Voice Role	Notes
1988	Who Framed Roger Rabbit	No	No	No	Yes		In-between Artist: Additional Animation
1988	Oliver & Company	No	No	Yes	No		
1989	The Little Mermaid	No	No	Yes	No		
1990	The Rescuers Down Under	No	No	Yes	No		
1991	Beauty and the Beast	No	No	Yes	No		
1994	The Lion King	No	No	No	Yes		Story Supervisor
1996	The Hunchback of Notre Dame	No	No	Yes	No		
1998	The Prince of Egypt	Yes	No	No	Yes	Miriam (singing)	
1999	Fantasia 2000	No	No	No	Yes		Original Concept: "The Pines of Rome"
2000	The Road to El Dorado	No	No	Additional	No		
2000	Chicken Run	No	No	Additional	No		
2001	Shrek	No	No	No	Yes		Special Thanks
2003	Sinbad: Legend of the Seven Seas	No	No	No	Yes		Special Thanks
2006	Cars	No	No	Yes	No		
2007	Ratatouille	No	No	No	Yes		Pixar Productions
2008	WALL-E	No	No	No	Yes		Pixar Senior Creative Team
2009	Up	No	No	No	Yes	Dog	Pixar Senior Creative Team
2010	Toy Story 3	No	No	No	Yes		Pixar Senior Creative Team
2011	Cars 2	No	No	No	Yes		Pixar Senior Creative Team
2012	Brave	Yes	Yes	No	Yes		Pixar Senior Creative Team
2015	Strange Magic	No	No	No	Yes	Imp	Story Consultant
2019	The Lion King	No	No	No	Yes		Thanks
2020	Come Away	Yes	No	No	No		

=== Television ===
Year	Title	Notes
1984	Heathcliff	lip sync checker 21 episodes
1985–1986	Hulk Hogan's Rock 'n' Wrestling	character designer 5 episodes
1986	Dennis the Menace	lip sync checker 65 episodes
1986–1987	The Real Ghostbusters	animator 76 episodes lip sync checker 2 episodes
1997	Cartoon Sushi	special thanks 1 episode

== Accolades ==
Award	Category	Title	Result	Ref.
Academy Awards	Best Animated Feature	Brave	Won	
Annie Awards	Best Achievement in Story Contribution	The Lion King	Won	
Annie Awards	Best Achievement in Storyboarding	The Hunchback of Notre Dame	Nominated	
Annie Awards	Outstanding Individual Achievement for Directing in an Animated Feature Production	The Prince of Egypt	Nominated	
Annie Awards	Best Animated Feature	Brave	Nominated	
Annie Awards	Writing in an Animated Feature Production	Brave	Nominated	
Critics' Choice Movie Awards	Best Animated Feature	The Prince of Egypt	Won (Note: Tied with A Bug's Life.)	
Golden Globe Awards	Best Animated Feature Film	Brave	Won	
Hugo Awards	Best Dramatic Presentation	Beauty and the Beast	Nominated	
Saturn Awards	Best Animated Film	Brave	Won	
Visual Effects Society	Outstanding Animation in an Animated Feature Motion Picture	Brave	Won	
