= Noni White =

American screenwriter and actress

- Born: Los Angeles, California, U.S.
- Occupations: Screenwriter, actress
- Notable work: Newsies (1992); The Hunchback of Notre Dame (1996); Anastasia (1997); Tarzan (1999); 102 Dalmatians (2000); Tarzan II (2005)
- Partner: Bob Tzudiker

Noni White is an American screenwriter and actress. White is best known for co-creating and writing the screenplay for Newsies along with her husband Bob Tzudiker, which was based on the real-life Newsboys' strike of 1899. Newsies began as a "classic underdog story ripped from the history books", with writers Tzudiker and White approaching producer Michael Finnell with an idea for a nonmusical drama; however, Disney studio head Jeffrey Katzenberg redirected the project to become a musical.

She also shares writing credit on The Hunchback of Notre Dame (1996), Anastasia (1997), Tarzan (1999), and 102 Dalmatians (2000). She also contributed to the film The Lion King (1994) and has written screenplays for every major studio.

The stage version of Newsies opened on Broadway on March 29, 2012, and closed on August 24, 2014, grossing over $100 million. The 2017 three-day cinema showing of Disney's Newsies: The Broadway Musical! broke ticketing records to become the highest-grossing Broadway event to date from Fathom Events.

She is a member of the writers' branch of the Academy of Motion Picture Arts and Sciences. She received several nominations for the Annie Award for Writing in a Feature Production.

Noni also works as an actress, and has appeared in The Prize Winner of Defiance, Ohio, 7th Heaven and The Positively True Adventures of the Alleged Texas Cheerleader-Murdering Mom, among many others.

== Awards and nominations ==
Year	Award	Category	Nominated work	Result
1997	Annie Award	Outstanding Individual Achievement for Writing in an Animated Feature Production	Anastasia	Nominated
1999	Annie Award	Outstanding Individual Achievement for Writing in an Animated Feature Production	Tarzan	Nominated
2006	DVD Exclusive Awards	Best Screenplay (for a DVD Premiere Movie)	Tarzan II	Nominated
