= Annika Bruhns =

German musical theater performer

Annika Bruhns (born August 8, 1966) is a German musical theater performer.

== Biography ==
Daughter to Wibke Bruhns, a journalist, and Werner Bruhns, an actor. She was born in Hamburg, Germany and moved with her family to Jerusalem, Israel in 1980. After she graduated from high school her family moved to Washington DC, US, where she majored in German literature and history at Connecticut College, New England, CT. She then continued her studies at the American Musical and Dramatic Academy (AMDA) in New York City, NY, where she graduated with honours. She started her performance career in NYC.

Bruhns debuted as Nina in NYC in a small Off-Broadway production of Anton Czechov's play The Seagull. From then on she continued working as a musical theater performer, moving to Vienna, Austria for the European Opening of Les Misérables in 1988. Many productions in the German speaking countries followed.

Annika Bruhns started teaching musical theater related subjects such as audition prep, song interpretation, stage improv as well as scene study in 2004. She has taught at the renowned Joop van den Ende Academy in Hamburg, Germany as well as at the Hamburg School of Entertainment.

Presently she divides her time between Sweden and Germany. She is married to Swedish musical theater performer Mickey Petersson and they have a son.

== Credits ==
=== Theatre ===
Year	Show	Role	Notes
2014	Dangerous Liaisons	Marquise de Merteuil	Domfestspiele Bad Gandersheim, Germany, May – August 2014
2014	Ronia the Robber's Daughter	Lovis	Domfestspiele Bad Gandersheim, Germany, May – August 2014
2011	Heisse Zeiten - Wechseljahre	Die Karrierefrau	Theaterschiff Lübeck, Germany, September – October 2011
2007–2010	Ich war noch niemals in New York	Alternate Lisa Wartberg	TUI Operettenhaus, Hamburg, Germany, December 2007 – October 2010
2002–2007	Mamma Mia!	Alternate Donna/Cover Tanya	TUI Operettenhaus, Hamburg, Germany, December 2002 – September 2007
2003	West Side Story	Anita	Deutsche Oper am Rhein, Düsseldorf, Germany, October – March 2003
2002	Jesus Christ Superstar	Mary Magdalene	Freilichtspiele Schwäbisch Hall, Germany, July – August 2002
2002	Chess	Florence	Staatstheater Kassel, Germany, February – June 2002
2001	Jesus Christ Superstar	Mary Magdalene	Freilichtspiele Schwäbisch Hall, Germany, July – August 2001
2001	Elisabeth	Ludovica/Fr. Wolf, Alternate Elisabeth	Colosseum Theater, Essen, Germany, March – January 2001
2000	Falco meets Amadeus	Tod/Kommissar	Theater des Westens, Berlin, Germany, September – December 2000
2000	Aladdin	Jasmin	Theater Aachen, Germany, November – February 2000
1999	Peggy – The Country Musical	Peggy	Star Theater, Hamburg, Germany, December 1999
1999	Adam and Eva	Rosa (the „snake“)	Theater Aachen, Germany, August – October 1999
1998	Blood Red Roses	Lucy	Theater Aachen, Germany, August ¬– October 1998
1998	Gaudí	Isabella	Musical Dome, Cologne, Germany, January – June 1998
1996–1997	Gambler	The Showgirl (lead)	Musicalbühne Mönchengladbach, Germany, October 1996 – May 1997
1995–1996	Gaudí	Isabella	Euro-Musical-Hall, Alsdorf, Germany, December 1995 – June 1996
1995	Le Cirque Offenbach	Lead	Schmidt Theater, Hamburg, Germany, September – November 1995
1995	Cabaret	Frl. Kost	Bad Hersfelder Festspiele, Germany, June – August 1995
1995	Die Delphi Dolls	Lead	Delphi Showpalast, Hamburg, Germany, April 1995
1994–1995	La Cage aux Folles	Cagelle, Cover Mdme. Dindon	Delphi Showpalast, Hamburg, Germany, September 1994 – April 1995
1994	Evita	Eva Peron	Freilichtspiele Schwäbisch Hall, Germany, August 1994
1993	Beehive	Lead	Mehr! Theater am Großmarkt, Hamburg, Germany, September – December 1993
1993	Evita	Eva Peron	Freilichtspiele Schwäbisch Hall, Germany, July – August 1993
1992–1993	Nunsense	Sister Robert Anne	Theater Hof, Germany, November 1992 – February 1993
1992–1993	Nunsense	Sister Robert Anne	Die Komödie, Frankfurt am Main, Germany, August – November 1992
1991–1992	Starmania	Cristal	Aalto-Musiktheater, Essen, Germany, December 1991 – June 1992
1991	Jesus Christ Superstar	Soul Girl/Mary Magdalene	Freilichtspiele Schwäbisch Hall, Germany, July – August 1991
1990–1991	Happy End	Mary/Ensemble	Münchner Tournee Theater/ Theater Heilbronn, Germany, December 1990 – April 1991
1990	Deutschlandlied Revue	Lead	Sartory-Säle, Cologne, Germany, April – June 1990
1988–1990	Les Misérables	Factoryworker/Eponine	Raimund Theater, Vienna, Austria, July 1988 – March 1990

=== Tour ===
Year	Show	Notes
2016–2017	Merci Chérie	Leadsinger, Sound Of Music Tour/Semmel Concerts Entertainment GmbH, Germany & Austria, 2016–2017
2010	Still Friends	solo concert with Pia Douwes, premiere March 2010
1993	Two Sides to a Story	Personality Show, premiere November 1993

=== Film ===
Year	Title	Role	Notes
2007	Der Ruf der Berge, Part 2	Frau Hallbach	ARD/ Degeto, December 2007
1997	Großstadtrevier (Episode 95)	Yvonne	Studio Hamburg; Prod./NDR, aired: February 1997
1995	Wolken am Horizont (Rosamunde Pilcher)	Kristie	Frankfurter Filmproduktion/ZDF, 1995
1995	Die Delphi Dolls (6 Live Musical TV Shows)	Lead	NDR /N3, October 1994 – April 1995
1994	On the Road	Anna (the Lady) Lead	European Broadcasting Union/ZDF, 1994
1992	Die Hella von Sinnen Show (Episode 5)	Jasmin	Power TV/Filmpool, RTL, 1992
1989	Baldur Blauzahn	Sieglinde (Episodes 4, 6, 7, 10, 11, 13)	Bavaria Film GmbH/WDR, 1989

== Discography ==
Year	Title	Details
2010	Annika	Solo Album original music, written & produced by Paul Glaser
2009	Musical Emotions	Soloist
2007	Ich war noch niemals in New York	Original Cast Rec., Ensemble
2006	Stage United – „Engel fliegen schneller“	Benefit „Sternenbrücke“
2006	Superstars des Musicals Vol. 2	Soloist
2005	Superstars des Musicals Vol. 1	Soloist
2004	Christmas Stories	Soloist
2004	Musicalstars singen ABBA-Hits	Soloist
2004	Mamma Mia!	German Cast Recording, Ensemble
2003	The Musicals of Kunze and Levay, Vol. 2	Soloist (Elisabeth)
2001	Elisabeth	Original Cast Recording
2000	Falco meets Amadeus	Original Cast Recording
2000	Peggy	Original Cast Recording
1998	Blood Red Roses	Original Cast Recording
1997	Gambler	Original Cast Recording
