= Bruhns =

Bruhns is a German surname. Notable people with the surname include:

- Arthur Bruhns (1874–1928), composer, pianist, and organist
- Birte Bruhns (born 1970), German middle-distance runner
- Friedrich Nicolaus Brauns (1637–1718), German composer and music director
- Júlia da Silva Bruhns (1851–1923), Brazilian wife of German politician Johann Heinrich Mann
- Karl Christian Bruhns (1830–1881), German astronomer
- Nicolaus Bruhns (1665–1697), German organist, violinist, and composer
- Wibke Bruhns (1938–2019), German journalist, television presenter and author
- Annika Bruhns (born 1966), German theater performer

== See also ==
- 5127 Bruhns, main-belt asteroid
- Bruns
- Brauns
