= Klamroth =

Klamroth is a surname. Notable people with this name include:

- Hans Georg Klamroth (1898–1944), Nazi businessman and reserve officer who participated in an attempt to assassinate Hitler
- Kathrin Klamroth (born 1968), German mathematician and computer scientist
- Lola Klamroth, actress in 2018 Italian-French film Capri-Revolution
- Sabine Klamroth (born 1933), German lawyer and author
- Wibke Bruhns (née Klamroth, 1938–2019), German journalist and author

== See also ==
- Erich Klamroth, fictional character in 1956 West German film Before Sundown
