= List of Stage Entertainment productions =

Drx Tavarak Choudhary

A list of all Stage Entertainment (Joop Van den Ende Theaterproducties / Stage Holding / Dodger Endemol Theatrical) productions, Stage Entertainment musicals produced by third parties under license are not included.

== Current and upcoming productions ==
Show	Country	Opening	Closing	Theater
The Lion King	Germany	2 December 2001	ongoing	Stage Theater im Hafen, Hamburg
Blue Man Group	Germany	4 February 2007	ongoing	Stage Bluemax Theater, Berlin
The Lion King	Spain	20 October 2011	ongoing	Teatro Lope de Vega, Madrid
Hadestown	United States of America	17 April 2019	ongoing	Walter Kerr Theatre, New York City
The Lion King	France	11 November 2021	ongoing	Théâtre Mogador, Paris
Frozen	Germany	16 November 2024	ongoing	Stage Apollo Theater, Stuttgart
MJ	Germany	3 December 2024	ongoing	Stage Theater an der Elbe, Hamburg
Harry Potter and the Cursed Child	The Netherlands	3 March 2026	ongoing	AFAS Circustheater, The Hague
Back to the Future	Germany	22 March 2026	14 February 2027	Stage Operettenhaus, Hamburg
El alma al aire	Spain	30 Septiembre 2026		Teatro Coliseum, Madrid
& Juliet	The Netherlands	7 October 2026		Beatrix Theater, Utrecht
& Juliet	Germany	8 October 2026		Stage Palladium Theater, Stuttgart
Upcoming
The Devil Wears Prada	Germany	3 December 2026		Stage Theater Neue Flora, Hamburg
Tanz der Vampire	Germany	11 March 2027		Stage Apollo Theater, Stuttgart
Tina	Germany	2027		Stage Operettenhaus, Hamburg
MJ	The Netherlands	2027		TBA
Moulin Rouge!	Spain	2027		Stage Gran Teatro Musical, Madrid

== Former productions ==
Show	Country	Year	Theater
3 Musketeers; Original Stage Entertainment Production	The Netherlands	2003–2004	Nieuwe Luxor Theater, Rotterdam
3 Musketeers; Original Stage Entertainment Production	Germany	2005–2006	Stage Theater des Westens, Berlin
3 Musketeers; Original Stage Entertainment Production	Germany	2006–2008	Stage Apollo Theater, Stuttgart
42nd Street	The Netherlands	2000–2001	Tour
42nd Street	United States of America	2001–2005	Foxwoods Theatre, New York City
42nd Street	Germany	2003–2004	Stage Apollo Theater, Stuttgart
A Chorus Line	The Netherlands	2001–2002	Tour
A Chorus Line	Italy	2019–2020	Teatro Nazionale, Milan
Aida	The Netherlands	2001–2003	VSB Circustheater, The Hague
Aida	The Netherlands	2023-2024	VSB Circustheater, The Hague
Aida	Germany	2003–2005	Stage Colosseum Theater, Essen
Aida	Germany; Switzerland	2005–2007	Tour
Aida in Concert	The Netherlands	2019	Autotron Den Bosch
Aladdin	Germany	2015–2019	Stage Theater Neue Flora, Hamburg
Aladdin	Germany	2019–2023	Stage Apollo Theater, Stuttgart
Aladdin	The Netherlands	2021–2023	AFAS Circustheater, The Hague
Aladdin	Spain	2023–2025	Teatro Coliseum, Madrid
All Shook Up	The Netherlands	2009–2010	Tour
Anastasia; Original Stage Entertainment Production	United States of America	2017–2019	Broadhurst Theatre, New York City
Anastasia; Original Stage Entertainment Production	United States of America	2018–2020	Tour
Anastasia; Original Stage Entertainment Production	Spain	2018–2020	Teatro Coliseum, Madrid
Anastasia; Original Stage Entertainment Production	Germany	2018–2019	Stage Palladium Theater, Stuttgart
Anastasia; Original Stage Entertainment Production	The Netherlands	2019–2020	AFAS Circustheater, The Hague
Anything Goes	United Kingdom	2015	Tour
Aspects of Love	The Netherlands	2012–2013	Tour
Barnum	The Netherlands	1988–1989	Tour
Bat Out Of Hell	Germany	2018–2019	Stage Metronom Theater, Oberhausen
Beauty and the Beast	Germany	2005–2007	Stage Metronom Theater, Oberhausen
Beauty and the Beast	Germany	2007	Stage Theater am Potzdamer Platz, Berlin
Beauty and the Beast	The Netherlands	2005–2007	Tour
Beauty and the Beast	The Netherlands	2015–2016	AFAS Circustheater, The Hague
Beauty and the Beast	Belgium	2007	Tour
Beauty and the Beast	Spain	2007–2009	Teatro Coliseum, Madrid
Beauty and the Beast	Spain	2009–2010	BTM, Barcelona
Beauty and the Beast	Spain	2012–2013	Tour
Beauty and the Beast	Russia	2008–2010	MDM Theater, Moscow
Beauty and the Beast	Russia	2014–2015	
Beauty and the Beast	Italy	2009–2010	Teatro Nazionale, Milan
Beauty and the Beast	Italy	2010–2011	Theatre Brancaccio, Rome
Beauty and the Beast	France	2013–2014	Théâtre Mogador, Paris
Best of Musical; Original Stage Entertainment Production	Germany	2006	Tour
Best of Musical; Original Stage Entertainment Production	Germany	2007	Tour
Best of Musical; Original Stage Entertainment Production	Germany	2010	Tour
Best of Musical; Original Stage Entertainment Production	Germany	2012	Tour
Best of Musical; Original Stage Entertainment Production	Germany	2014	Tour
Big Fish	United States of America	2013	Neil Simon Theatre, New York City
Billy Elliot	The Netherlands	2014–2015	AFAS Circustheater, The Hague
Blood Brothers	The Netherlands	1998–1999	Tour
Blue Man Group	Germany	2004–2007	Stage Theater am Potsdamer Platz, Berlin
Blue Man Group	Germany	2007–2008	Stage Metronom Theater, Oberhausen
Blue Man Group	Germany	2008	Stage Apollo Theater, Stuttgart
Blue Man Group	United Kingdom	2005–2007	New London Theater, London
Blue Man Group	The Netherlands	2006–2007	Theater Fabriek, Amsterdam
Boyband	The Netherlands	2000–2001	Tour
Buddy	Germany	2009–2010	Stage Colosseum Theater, Essen
Cabaret	Spain	2003–2006	Nuevo Teatro Alcalá, Madrid
Cabaret	Spain	2006–2007	Tour
Cabaret	Spain	2007–2008	Teatre Apolo, Barcelona
Cabaret	The Netherlands	1989–1990	Koninklijk Theater Carré, Amsterdam
Cabaret	The Netherlands	2006	Koninklijk Theater Carré, Amsterdam
Cabaret	France	2006–2008	Théâtre des Folies Bergères,’’ Paris
Cabaret	France	2011	Théâtre Marigny, Paris
Cabaret	France	2012	Tour
Cats	Germany	2001–2002	Stage Palladium Theater, Stuttgart
Cats	Germany	2002–2004	Stage Theater am Potsdamer Platz, Berlin
Cats	Germany; Austria; Switzerland	2004–2005	Tour
Cats	Spain	2003–2005	Teatro Coliseum, Madrid
Cats	Russia	2005–2006	MDM Theater, Moscow
Cats	The Netherlands	2006–2007	Tour
Cats	France	2015–2016	Théâtre Mogador, Paris
Chicago	The Netherlands	1999–2001	Beatrix Theater, Utrecht
Chicago	Spain	2009–2010	Teatro Coliseum, Madrid
Chicago	Spain	2010–2012	Tour
Chicago	Spain	2011	Teatre Tívoli, Barcelona
Chicago	Spain	2011–2012	Teatro Nuevo Alcalá, Madrid
Chicago	Russia	2013–2014	MDM Theater, Moscow
Chicago	Russia	2014	Rossiya Theatre, Moscow
Chicago	Germany	2014–2015	Stage Palladium Theatre, Stuttgart
Chicago	Germany	2015–2016	Stage Theater des Westens, Berlin
Chicago	Germany	2016	Deutsches Theater, Munich
Chicago	France	2018–2019	Théâtre Mogador, Paris
Chicago	France	2025–2026	Casino de Paris, Paris
Cinderella	Russia	2016–2017	Rossiya Theatre, Moscow
Cinderella	Spain	2025–2026	Teatro Coliseum, Madrid
Cirque Du Soleil Paramour	Germany	2019–2020	Stage Theater Neue Flora, Hamburg
Ciske de Rat; Original Stage Entertainment Production	The Netherlands	2007–2009	Tour
Ciske de Rat; Original Stage Entertainment Production	The Netherlands	2016–2017	Tour
Copacabana	The Netherlands	2002–2003	Tour
Crazy for You	The Netherlands	2004–2005	Tour
Cyrano; Original Stage Entertainment Production	The Netherlands	1992–1994	Tour
Cyrano; Original Stage Entertainment Production	United States of America	1994	Neil Simon Theatre, New York City
Das Wunder von Bern; Original Stage Entertainment Production	Germany	2014–2017	Stage Theater an der Elbe, Hamburg
De Jantjes	The Netherlands	1997–1998	Tour
De Jantjes	The Netherlands	2004–2005	Tour
De Tweeling; Original Stage Entertainment Production	The Netherlands	2015–2016	Tour
Die Weihnachtsbäckerei	Germany	2024	Stage Theater des Westens, Berlin
Der Schuh des Manitu; Original Stage Entertainment Production	Germany	2008–2010	Stage Theater des Westens, Berlin
Dirty Dancing	Germany	2006–2008	Stage Theater Neue Flora, Hamburg
Dirty Dancing	Germany	2009–2010	Stage Theater am Potsdamer Platz, Berlin
Dirty Dancing	Germany	2011–2012	Stage Metronom Theater, Oberhausen
Dirty Dancing	The Netherlands	2008–2009	Beatrix Theater, Utrecht
Disney Musical Sing-a-long	The Netherlands	2009–2010	Tour
Dracula	United States of America	2004–2005	Belasco Theatre, New York City
Dreamgirls	The Netherlands	2014–2015**	Tour
Droomvlucht; Original Stage Entertainment Production	The Netherlands	2011–2012	Efteling Theater, Kaatsheuvel
Een avond met Dorus; Original Stage Entertainment Production	The Netherlands	2014–2015**	Tour
Evita	The Netherlands	1995–1997	Tour
Evita	The Netherlands	2005–2007	Tour
Elisabeth	The Netherlands	1999–2001	VSB Circustheater, The Hague
Elisabeth	Germany	2001–2003	Stage Colosseum Theater, Essen
Elisabeth	Germany	2005–2006	Stage Apollo Theater, Stuttgart
Elisabeth	Germany	2008	Stage Theater des Westens, Berlin
Elisabeth in Concert	The Netherlands	2017	Het Loo Palace, Apeldoorn
Elisabeth in Concert	The Netherlands	2018	Paleis Soestdijk, Baarn
Fame	The Netherlands	1999–2000	Tour
Fiddler on the Roof	The Netherlands	1998–1999	Tour
Fiddler on the Roof	The Netherlands	2017–2018	Tour
Flashdance	Italy	2010–2011	Teatro Nazionale, Milan
Flashdance	Italy	2017–2018	Teatro Nazionale, Milan
Frozen	Germany	2021-2024	Stage Theater an der Elbe, Hamburg
Frozen	The Netherlands	2024-2026	AFAS Circustheater, The Hague
Funny Girl	The Netherlands	1991–1992	Tour
Ghost	Russia	2017–2018	MDM Theater, Moscow
Ghost	Germany	2017–2018	Stage Theater des Westens, Berlin
Ghost	Germany	2018–2019	Stage Operettenhaus, Hamburg
Ghost	Germany	2019–2020	Stage Palladium Theater, Stuttgart
Ghost	France	2019	Théâtre Mogador, Paris
Good Vibrations	United States of America	2005	Eugene O'Neill Theatre, New York City
Grease	The Netherlands	2015–2016	Tour
Grease	France	2017–2018	Théâtre Mogador, Paris
Hair	The Netherlands	2016–2017	Tour
Hairspray	United Kingdom	2007–2010	Shaftesbury Theatre, London
Hairspray	United Kingdom	2010–2011	Tour
Hairspray	United Kingdom	2013	Tour
Hamilton	Germany	2022-2023	Stage Operettenhaus, Hamburg
Heel Holland Zingt Hazes	The Netherlands	2013	Ziggo Dome, Amsterdam
Heel Holland Zingt Hazes	The Netherlands	2014	Ziggo Dome, Amsterdam
Heel Holland Zingt Hazes	The Netherlands	2015	Ziggo Dome, Amsterdam
Heel Holland Zingt Hazes	The Netherlands	2016	Ziggo Dome, Amsterdam
Hercules	Germany	2024-2025	Stage Theater Neue Flora, Hamburg
High School Musical	United Kingdom	2008	Hammersmith Apollo, London
High School Musical	United Kingdom	2008–2009	Tour
High School Musical	Spain	2008–2009	Tour
High School Musical	Spain	2008–2009	Teatro Lope de Vega, Madrid
High School Musical	Netherlands	2009	Tour
High School Musical 2	United Kingdom	2009–2010	Tour
Hij Gelooft in Mij; Original Stage Entertainment Production	Netherlands	2012–2015	DeLaMar Theater, Amsterdam
Hij Gelooft in Mij; Original Stage Entertainment Production	Netherlands	2022	Tour
Hinterm Horizont; Original Stage Entertainment Production	Germany	2011–2016	Stage Theater am Potsdamer Platz, Berlin
Hinterm Horizont; Original Stage Entertainment Production	Germany	2016–2017	Stage Operettenhaus, Hamburg
I Can't Sing!	United Kingdom	2014	London Palladium, London
Ich war noch niemals in New York; Original Stage Entertainment Production	Germany	2007–2010	Stage Operettenhaus, Hamburg
Ich war noch niemals in New York; Original Stage Entertainment Production	Germany	2010–2012	Stage Apollo Theater, Stuttgart
Ich war noch niemals in New York; Original Stage Entertainment Production	Germany	2012–2013	Stage Metronom Theater, Oberhausen
Ich war noch niemals in New York; Original Stage Entertainment Production	Germany	2015	Stage Theater des Westens, Berlin
Ich war noch niemals in New York; Original Stage Entertainment Production	Germany	2015–2017	Tour
Ich war noch niemals in New York; Original Stage Entertainment Production	Germany	2017	Stage Theater an der Elbe, Hamburg
Ich war noch niemals in New York; Original Stage Entertainment Production	Germany	2021–2022	Tour
Ich will Spaß; Original Stage Entertainment Production	Germany	2008–2009	Stage Colosseum Theater, Essen
Into the Woods	United States of America	2002	Broadhurst Theatre, New York City
Jesus Christ Superstar	The Netherlands; Belgium	2005–2006	Tour
Jesus Christ Superstar	Spain	2007–2008	Teatro Lope de Vega, Barcelona
Jesus Christ Superstar	Spain	2008–2009	Tour
Jesus Christ Superstar	Spain	2009	Teatre Apolo, Barcelona
Jersey Boys	The Netherlands	2013–2014	Beatrix Theater, Utrecht
Joe; Original Stage Entertainment Production	The Netherlands	1997–1998	Tour
Joseph and the Amazing Technicolor Dreamcoat	The Netherlands	2008–2010	Tour
& Juliet	Germany	2024–2026	Stage Operettenhaus, Hamburg
Kinky Boots	Germany	2017–2018	Stage Operettenhaus, Hamburg
Ku'Damm 56; Original Stage Entertainment Production	Germany	2021–2023	Stage Theater des Westens, Berlin
Ku'Damm '59; Original Stage Entertainment Production	Germany	2024–2025	Stage Theater des Westens, Berlin
La Cage Aux Folles	The Netherlands	2010–2011	DeLaMar Theater, Amsterdam; Tour
Lazarus	The Netherlands	2019–2020	DeLaMar Theater, Amsterdam
Les Misérables	The Netherlands	1991–1992	Koninklijk Theater Carré, Amsterdam; VSB Circustheater, The Hague
Les Misérables	The Netherlands	2008–2009	Nieuwe Luxor Theater, Rotterdam; Koninklijk Theater Carré, Amsterdam
Les Misérables	Spain	2010–2011	Teatro Lope de Vega, Madrid
Les Misérables	Spain	2011–2012	BTM, Barcelona
Les Misérables	Spain	2013–2015	Tour
Les Misérables	Spain	2014	Gran Teatre del Liceu, Barcelona
Love Never Dies	Germany	2015–2016	Stage Operettenhaus, Hamburg
Love Story	The Netherlands	2013–2014	Tour
Made in Dagenham	United Kingdom	2014–2015	Adelphi Theatre, London
Mamma Mia!	Germany	2002–2007	Stage Operettenhaus, Hamburg
Mamma Mia!	Germany	2004–2007	Stage Palladium Theater, Stuttgart
Mamma Mia!	Germany	2007–2008	Stage Colosseum Theater, Essen
Mamma Mia!	Germany	2007–2009	Stage Theater am Potsdamer Platz, Berlin
Mamma Mia!	Germany	2013–2014	Stage Palladium Theater, Stuttgart
Mamma Mia!	Germany	2014–2015	Stage Theater des Westens, Berlin
Mamma Mia!	Germany	2019–2020	Stage Theater des Westens, Berlin
Mamma Mia!	Germany	2022-2024	Stage Theater Neue Flora, Hamburg
Mamma Mia!	The Netherlands	2004–2007	Beatrix Theater, Utrecht
Mamma Mia!	The Netherlands	2010–2011	Tour
Mamma Mia!	The Netherlands	2018–2019	Beatrix Theater, Utrecht
Mamma Mia!	Spain	2004–2007	Teatro Lope de Vega, Madrid
Mamma Mia!	Spain	2007–2009	BTM, Barcelona
Mamma Mia!	Spain	2009–2011	Tour
Mamma Mia!	Spain	2010–2011	Teatro Coliseum, Madrid
Mamma Mia!	Spain	2015–2016	Teatre Tívoli, Barcelona
Mamma Mia!	Spain	2016–2017	Tour
Mamma Mia!	Spain	2017	Teatro Coliseum, Madrid
Mamma Mia!	Belgium	2006	Stadsschouwburg, Antwerp
Mamma Mia!	Italy	2010–2011	Teatro Nazionale, Milan
Mamma Mia!	Italy	2011–2012	Teatro Brancaccio, Rome
Mamma Mia!	France	2010–2012	Théâtre Mogador, Paris
Mamma Mia!	France	2012–2014	Tour
Mamma Mia!	France	2023-2024	Casino de Paris, Paris
Mamma Mia!	Russia	2006–2008	MDM Theater, Moscow
Mamma Mia!	Russia	2013–2013	MDM Theater, Moscow
Mary Poppins	The Netherlands	2010–2011	Fortis Circustheater, The Hague
Mary Poppins	Germany	2016–2018	Stage Apollo Theater, Stuttgart
Mary Poppins	Germany	2018–2019	Stage Theater an der Elbe, Hamburg
Miss Saigon	The Netherlands	1996–1999	VSB Circustheater, The Hague
Miss Saigon	The Netherlands	2011–2012	Beatrix Theater, Utrecht
Moeder, ik wil bij de Reveu; Original Stage Entertainment Production	The Netherlands	2014–2015	Beatrix Theater, Utrecht
Moulin Rouge!	The Netherlands	2024–2026	Beatrix Theater, Utrecht
Next to Normal	The Netherlands	2012	Tour
Oliver!	The Netherlands	1999–2000	Tour
Oliver!	United Kingdom	2011–2013	Tour
On Your Feet!	The Netherlands	2017–2018	Beatrix Theater, Utrecht
Once Upon a One More Time	United States of America	2023	Marquis Theater, New York City
Passion	The Netherlands	2004–2005	Tour
Petticoat; Original Stage Entertainment Production	The Netherlands	2010–2011	Tour
Pretty Woman	United States of America	2018–2019	Nederlander Theatre, New York City
Pretty Woman	Germany	2019–2020	Stage Theater an der Elbe, Hamburg
Pretty Woman	Italy	2021–2022	Teatro Nazionale, Milan
Pretty Woman	The Netherlands	2023-2024	Beatrix Theater, Utrecht
Rebecca	Germany	2011–2013	Stage Palladium Theater, Stuttgart
Rent	The Netherlands	2000–2001	Tour
Rex	The Netherlands	2001–2002	Tour
Robert Long; Original Stage Entertainment Production	The Netherlands	2015–2016**	Tour
Rocky; Original Stage Entertainment Production	Germany	2012–2015	Stage Operettenhaus, Hamburg
Rocky; Original Stage Entertainment Production	Germany	2015–2017	Stage Palladium Theater, Stuttgart
Rocky; Original Stage Entertainment Production	United States of America	2014	Winter Garden Theatre, New York City
Romeo & Julia - Liebe ist Alles; Original Stage Entertainment Production	Germany	2023-2024	Stage Theater des Westens, Berlin
Saturday Night Fever	The Netherlands	2001–2003	Beatrix Theater, Utrecht
Saturday Night Fever	The Netherlands	2012	Tour
Saturday Night Fever	Spain	2009	Teatro Coliseum, Madrid
Saturday Night Fever	Spain	2009–2010	Tour
Saturday Night Fever	Italy	2012-2013	Teatro Nazionale, Milan
Singin' in the Rain	United Kingdom	2012–2013	Palace Theatre, London
Singin' in the Rain	United Kingdom	2013–2014	Tour
Singin' in the Rain	Russia	2015–2016	Rossiya Theatre, Moscow
Singin' in the Rain	Italy	2019–2020	Teatro Nazionale, Milan
Sister Act; Original Stage Entertainment Production	United Kingdom	2009–2010	London Palladium, London
Sister Act; Original Stage Entertainment Production	United Kingdom	2011–2012	Tour
Sister Act; Original Stage Entertainment Production	Germany	2010–2012	Stage Operettenhaus, Hamburg
Sister Act; Original Stage Entertainment Production	Germany	2012–2013	Stage Apollo Theater, Stuttgart
Sister Act; Original Stage Entertainment Production	Germany	2013–2015	Stage Metronom Theater, Oberhausen
Sister Act; Original Stage Entertainment Production	Germany	2016–2017	Tour
Sister Act; Original Stage Entertainment Production	United States of America	2011–2012	Broadway Theatre, New York City
Sister Act; Original Stage Entertainment Production	United States of America	2012–2014	1st Tour
Sister Act; Original Stage Entertainment Production	United States of America	2014–2015	2nd Tour
Sister Act; Original Stage Entertainment Production	Italy	2011–2012	Teatro Nazionale, Milan
Sister Act; Original Stage Entertainment Production	Italy	2022–2023	Teatro Nazionale, Milan
Sister Act; Original Stage Entertainment Production	France	2012–2013	Théâtre Mogador, Paris
Sister Act; Original Stage Entertainment Production	The Netherlands	2013–2014	AFAS Circustheater, The Hague
Sister Act; Original Stage Entertainment Production	Spain	2014–2015	Teatre Tívoli, Barcelona
Sister Act; Original Stage Entertainment Production	Spain	2015–2016	Tour
Sister Act; Original Stage Entertainment Production	Spain	2016	Nuevo Teatro Alcalá, Madrid
Sonneveld in DeLaMar; Original Stage Entertainment Production	The Netherlands	2015**	DeLaMar Theater, Amsterdam
Spamalot	France	2023-2024	Théâtre de Paris, Paris
Spring Awakening	The Netherlands	2011	Tour
Strictly Come Dancing Live!	United Kingdom	2008	Tour
Strictly Come Dancing Live!	United Kingdom	2009	Tour
Strictly Come Dancing Live!	United Kingdom	2010	Tour
Strictly Come Dancing Live!	United Kingdom	2011	Tour
Strictly Come Dancing Live!	United Kingdom	2012	Tour
Strictly Come Dancing Live!	United Kingdom	2013	Tour
Strictly Come Dancing Live!	United Kingdom	2014	Tour
Strictly Come Dancing Live!	United Kingdom	2015	Tour
Strictly Come Dancing Live!	United Kingdom	2016	Tour
Strictly Come Dancing Live!	United Kingdom	2017	Tour
Strictly Come Dancing Live!	United Kingdom	2018	Tour
Strictly Come Dancing Live!	United Kingdom	2019	Tour
Strictly Come Dancing Live!	United Kingdom	2020	Tour
Strictly Come Dancing Live!	United Kingdom	2022	Tour
Strictly Come Dancing Live!	United Kingdom	2023	Tour
Sunset Boulevard	The Netherlands	2008–2009	Tour
Sweeney Todd	The Netherlands	1993–1994	Tour
Sweet Charity	The Netherlands	1989–1991	Tour
Tanz der Vampire	Germany	2003–2003	Stage Apollo Theater, Stuttgart
Tanz der Vampire	Germany	2003–2006	Stage Theater Neue Flora, Hamburg
Tanz der Vampire	Germany	2006–2008	Stage Theater des Westens, Berlin
Tanz der Vampire	Germany	2008–2010	Stage Metronom Theater, Oberhausen
Tanz der Vampire	Germany	2010–2011	Stage Palladium Theater, Stuttgart
Tanz der Vampire	Germany	2011–2013	Stage Theater des Westens, Berlin
Tanz der Vampire	Germany	2016	Stage Theater des Westens, Berlin
Tanz der Vampire	Germany	2016–2017	Deutsches Theater, Munich
Tanz der Vampire	Germany	2017–2018	Stage Theater an der Elbe, Hamburg
Tanz der Vampire	Germany	2018	Musical Dome, Cologne
Tanz der Vampire	Germany	2018–2019	Stage Theater des Westens, Berlin
Tanz der Vampire	Germany	2019–2020	Stage Metronom Theater, Oberhausen
Tanz der Vampire	Germany	2021–2023	Stage Palladium Theater, Stuttgart
Tanz der Vampire	Germany	2023–2024	Stage Operettenhaus, Hamburg
Tanz der Vampire	France	2014–2015	Théâtre Mogador, Paris
Tanz der Vampire	Russia	2016–2017	MDM Theater, Moscow
Tarzan	The Netherlands	2007–2009	Fortis Circustheater, The Hague
Tarzan	Germany	2008–2013	Stage Theater Neue Flora, Hamburg
Tarzan	Germany	2013–2016	Stage Apollo Theater, Stuttgart
Tarzan	Germany	2016–2018	Stage Metronom Theater, Oberhausen
Tarzan	Germany	2025–2026	Stage Theater Neue Flora, Hamburg
The Band	Germany	2019	Stage Theater des Westens, Berlin
The Band	Germany	2019	Deutsches Theater, Munich
The Bodyguard	The Netherlands	2015–2017	Beatrix Theater, Utrecht
The Bodyguard	The Netherlands	2023	Beatrix Theater, Utrecht
The Bodyguard	Spain	2017–2018	Teatro Coliseum, Madrid
The Bodyguard	Germany	2017–2018	Stage Palladium Theater, Stuttgart
The Hunchback of Notre Dame	Germany	1999–2002*	Stage Theater am Potsdamer Platz, Berlin
The Hunchback of Notre Dame	Germany	2017	Stage Theater des Westens, Berlin
The Hunchback of Notre Dame	Germany	2017–2018	Deutsches Theater, Munich
The Hunchback of Notre Dame	Germany	2018–2019	Stage Apollo Theater, Stuttgart
The Lion King	The Netherlands	2004–2006	Fortis Circustheater, The Hague
The Lion King	The Netherlands	2016–2019	AFAS Circustheater, The Hague
The Lion King	France	2007–2010	Théâtre Mogador, Paris
The Little Mermaid	The Netherlands	2012–2013	Tour
The Little Mermaid	Russia	2012–2014	Rossiya Theatre, Moscow
The Phantom of the Opera	Germany	2002–2004	Stage Palladium Theater, Stuttgart
The Phantom of the Opera	Germany	2005–2007	Stage Colosseum Theater, Essen
The Phantom of the Opera	Germany	2013–2015	Stage Theater Neue Flora, Hamburg
The Phantom of the Opera	The Netherlands	1993–1996	VSB Circustheater, The Hague
The Phantom of the Opera	Spain	2002–2004	Teatro Lope de Vega, Madrid
The Phantom of the Opera	Russia	2014–2016	MDM Theatre, Moscow
The Producers	Spain	2006–2007	Teatro Coliseum, Madrid
The Producers	France	2021-2023	Théâtre de Paris, Paris
The Sound of Music	The Netherlands	2002–2004	Tour
The Sound of Music	The Netherlands	2014–2015**	Tour
The Sound of Music	The Netherlands	2021–2022	Tour
The Sound of Music	Russia	2011–2012	MDM Theater, Moscow
The Wiz	The Netherlands	2006–2007	Beatrix Theater, Utrecht
Tina; Original Stage Entertainment Production	United Kingdom	2018–2025	Aldwych Theatre, London
Tina; Original Stage Entertainment Production	United Kingdom	2025–2026	Tour
Tina; Original Stage Entertainment Production	Germany	2019–2022	Stage Operettenhaus, Hamburg
Tina; Original Stage Entertainment Production	Germany	2023-2024	Stage Apollo Theater, Stuttgart
Tina; Original Stage Entertainment Production	United States of America	2019–2022	Lunt-Fontanne Theatre, New York City
Tina; Original Stage Entertainment Production	United States of America	2022-2024	Tour
Tina; Original Stage Entertainment Production	The Netherlands	2020–2023	Beatrix Theater, Utrecht
Tina; Original Stage Entertainment Production	Spain	2021–2023	Teatro Coliseum, Madrid
Titanic	United States of America	1997–1999	Lunt-Fontanne Theatre, New York City
Titanic	The Netherlands	2001–2002	Tour
Titanic	Germany	2002–2003	Stage Theater Neue Flora, Hamburg
Tsjechov	The Netherlands	1992–1993	Tour
Urinetown	The Netherlands	2010–2011	Tour
Victor/Victoria	United States of America	1995–1997	Marquis Theater, New York City
Victor/Victoria	Spain	2005–2006	Teatro Coliseum, Madrid
War Horse	Germany	2013	Stage Theater des Westens, Berlin
War Horse	The Netherlands	2014–2015	Tour
Was getekend, Annie M.G. Schmidt; Original Stage Entertainment Production	The Netherlands	2017–2019	Tour; DeLaMar Theater, Amsterdam
We Will Rock You	Germany	2008–2010	Stage Apollo Theater, Stuttgart
We Will Rock You	Germany	2010–2011	Stage Theater des Westens, Berlin
We Will Rock You	Germany	2025–2026	Stage Palladium Theater, Stuttgart
We Will Rock You	The Netherlands	2010–2011	Beatrix Theater, Utrecht
West Side Story	The Netherlands	1996–1998	Tour
Wicked	Germany	2007–2010	Stage Palladium Theater, Stuttgart
Wicked	Germany	2010–2011	Stage Metronom Theater, Oberhausen
Wicked	Germany	2021–2022	Stage Theater Neue Flora, Hamburg
Wicked	The Netherlands	2011–2013	AFAS Circustheater, The Hague
Zorro	France	2009–2010	Théâtre des Folies Bergères, Paris
Zorro	Russia	2010–2011	MDM Theater, Moscow
Zorro	The Netherlands	2011–2012	Tour

* Production taken over from Stella AG.
** Production taken over from Albert Verlinde Entertainment
