= Neue Flora =

Musical theater building in Altona, Hamburg, Germany

Coordinates: 53°33′45″N 9°57′01″E

Stage Theater Neue Flora
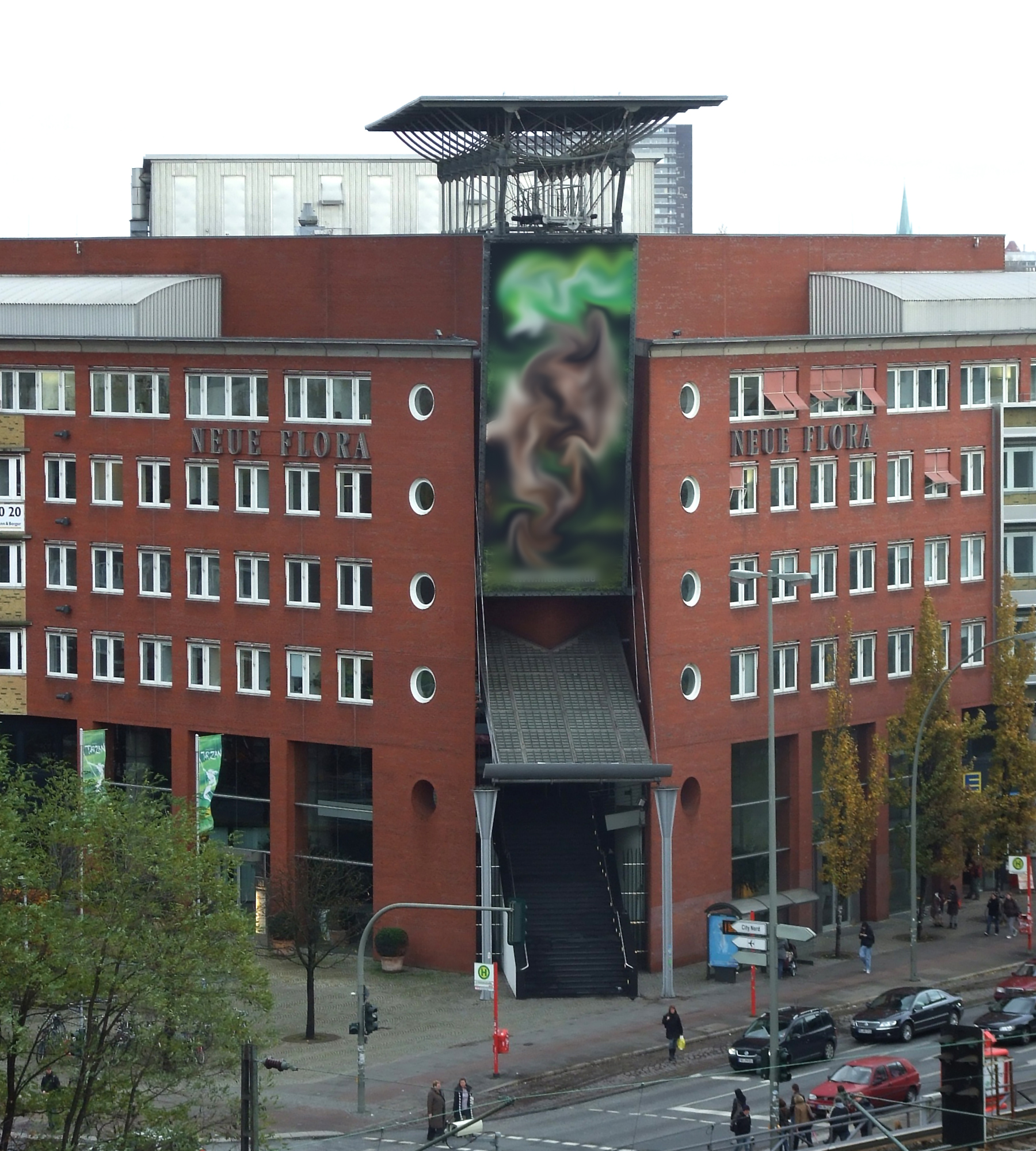
- Neue Flora Theater, 2010
- Interactive map of Stage Theater Neue Flora
- Address: Stresemannstraße 159a, 22769; Hamburg; Germany
- Owner: Stage Entertainment
- Capacity: 1,850
- Production: Current: vacant July 2021: Wicked; August 2022: Mamma Mia!

Website
- Stage Theater Neue Flora

Neue Flora (Stage Theater Neue Flora) is a musical theatre in Hamburg, owned and operated by Stage Entertainment.

== History ==
In 1987 Stella Entertainment was looking for a new musical theatre in Hamburg, after their success with Cats in the Operettenhaus. Together with the city they picked the Rote Flora, but after massive protests and after squatters took over the building Stella abandoned their plans. In Altona the company found a new site for their theater and after a construction period of 22 months and again many protest the theater opened in 1990 with Das Phantom der Oper.

At the beginning of the millennium Stella Entertainment got into financial troubles, resulting in a bankruptcy. The Dutch company Stage Entertainment (Stage Holding at the time) acquired several parts of Stella Entertainment, including the Neue Flora in 2002.

== Productions ==
| Show | Start | End | Producer | Note |
|---|---|---|---|---|
| Das Phantom der Oper | 29 June 1990 | 30 June 2001 | Stella Entertainment | German premiere |
| Mozart! | 21 September 2001 | 30 June 2002 | Stella Entertainment | German premiere |
| Titanic | 7 December 2002 | 5 October 2003 | Stage Entertainment | German premiere |
| Tanz der Vampire | 7 December 2003 | 22 January 2006 | Stage Entertainment | |
| Dirty Dancing | 16 March 2006 | 29 June 2008 | Stage Entertainment | European premiere |
| Tarzan | 2 October 2008 | 30 October 2013 | Stage Entertainment | German premiere |
| Das Phantom der Oper | 28 November 2013 | 30 September 2015 | Stage Entertainment | |
| Aladdin | 6 December 2015 | 3 February 2019 | Stage Entertainment | European premiere |
| Paramour (Cirque du Soleil) | 14 April 2019 | 12 March 2020 | Stage Entertainment | European premiere |
| Wicked | 5 September 2021 | 14 August 2022 | Stage Entertainment | |
| Mamma Mia! | 11 September 2022 | 21 January 2024 | Stage Entertainment | |
| Hercules | 24 March 2024 | 4 September 2025 | Stage Entertainment | World premiere |
| Tarzan | 20 November 2025 | | Stage Entertainment | |
