= Valley Fair Mall =

Valley Fair Mall may refer to:

- Valley Fair Mall (West Valley City, Utah)
- Valley Fair Shopping Center, in Appleton, Wisconsin
- Westfield Valley Fair, overlaying parts of both the California cities of San Jose and Santa Clara
