= Stage Entertainment =

Live entertainment company based in Amsterdam

- Industry: Theatre
- Founded: 1998
- Founder: Joop van den Ende
- Headquarters: Amsterdam, Netherlands
- Key people: Arthur de Bok
- Products: Productions
- Parent: Advance Publications
- Website: Official website

Stage Entertainment is an international operating live entertainment company, a subsidiary of Advance Publications. The company was founded in 1998 by Joop van den Ende in Amsterdam.

== History ==
=== The Netherlands / Corporate ===
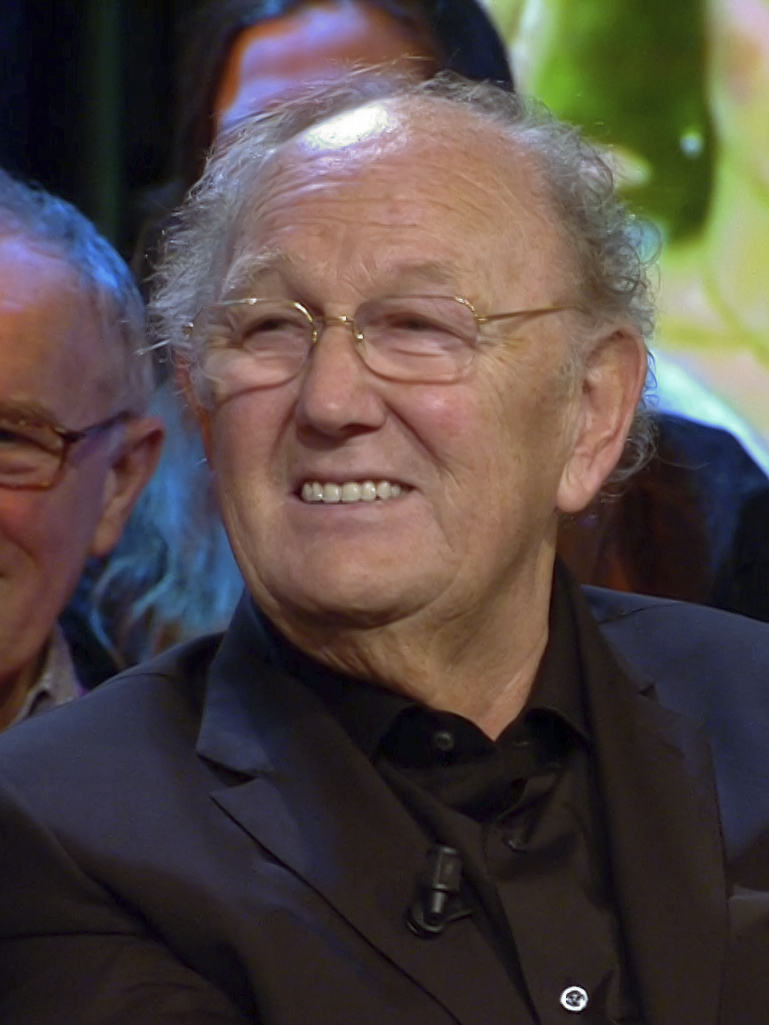
Joop van den Ende, founder of Stage Entertainment

The root of the company lays in The Netherlands in the 1970s when Joop van den Ende - until then an agent and television producer - started producing theater, in the first years he mostly produced plays and comedies. This changed at the end of the 1980s when he discovered that there was a demand for American musicals and his first try at this was with the musical Barnum in 1988. Several musicals followed, with titles as Sweet Charity and Cabaret. Owing to the success of these productions van den Ende doubled down on musicals, with a dedicated reservation line in 1990, an open-end theatre in The Hague called Circustheater in 1991 and his own musical Cyrano: The Musical in 1993.

Van den Ende and John de Mol - until then the two biggest competitors - decided to merge their companies into Endemol in 1993, all live entertainment was folded into the Endemol Live Entertainment Division. The company went partially public in 1996 and due to the uncertain income of live entertainment part of the board of directors and shareholders were getting unhappy with the division and wanted to only focus on television productions to create a steady flow of revenue. Therefore, in 1998 van den Ende decided to buyout the entire Endemol Live Entertainment Division for ƒ 169,5 million and forming a new company called Stage Holding, which would be renamed Stage Entertainment in 2005. That same year construction started on a second open-end theater in Utrecht, which would open in 1999 called Beatrix Theater. Van den Ende stayed on as board member and shareholder for Endemol until 2000, when Telefonica acquired the entire company for $5.3 billion. After the sell van den Ende could focus entirely on his new company which he wanted to grow into an international enterprise focusing on owning theaters and producing musicals. In order to do that he arranged licensing deals with Disney Theatrical, Little Star, Cameron Mackintosh, Really Useful Group and Vereinigte Bühnen Wien for their productions. Besides producing third party musicals, the company also started creating own musicals for the Dutch, German and international market such as 3 Musketeers, Sister Act, Petticoat and Tina: The Tina Turner Musical.

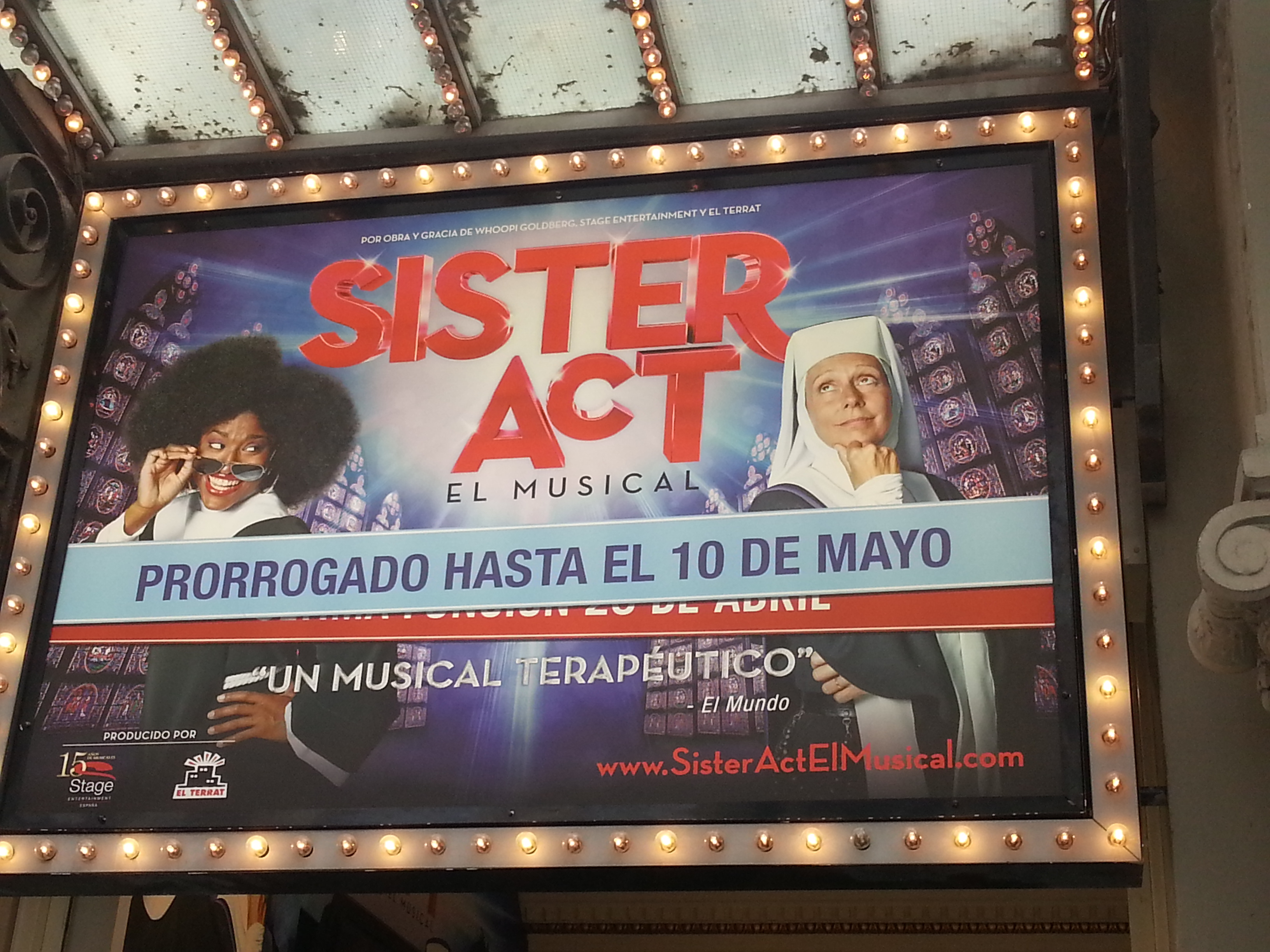
Promotion for Sister Act, a Stage Entertainment original production

Dutch competitor Albert Verlinde Entertainment - a company that was specialised in touring productions - was acquired in 2015 and van den Ende made Albert Verlinde managing director of the Dutch subsidiary. That same year he sold 60% of Stage Entertainment to CVC Capital Partners, he would only stay on as advisor to the company and as 40% shareholder. Stage Entertainment was again sold in 2018, this time the entire company was bought by Advance Publications.

=== United States ===
Following the Dutch success of Cyrano, van den Ende decided to bring the musical to Broadway in 1994. The production was a critical and financial flop, but it gave van den Ende the chance to co-produce several other titles in the following years such as Victor/Victoria, Titanic and Hamlet.

In 1996 Endemol bought the American Holiday on Ice, a year later the company entered into a joint venture with Dodger Theatrical and formed Dodger Endemol Theatricals. The joint venture created several musicals and also established a theater complex in New York's Hell's Kitchen named New World Stages (Dodger Stages at opening) in 2004. Stage Entertainment took full control of the complex in 2006, they sold it in 2014 to The Shubert Organization

=== Germany ===
In 2001 the company entered the Germany marked when it acquired the Colosseum Theater in Essen and the Theater im Hafen in Hamburg, where Elizabeth and The Lion King opened respectively. Until then the German market was for the most part served by Stella AG, but this company had severe financial troubles and ceased operation in 2002. Van den Ende acquired a large part of their assets including theaters and running productions, making Stage Entertainment directly one of the leading entertainment companies. In the following years the company grew and acquired several new theaters in Berlin (Theater des Westens in 2003 and Stage Bluemax Theater in 2007), Oberhausen (Metronom Theater in 2005), Munich (Werk7 Theater in 2018) and built a fourth theater in Hamburg (Stage Theater an der Elbe in 2015). After CVC Capital Partners in 2015 and Advance Publications in 2018 took control of the company several theaters were left vacant or sold, so the company could only focus on Stuttgart, Berlin and Hamburg. Stage Entertainment created several own musicals for the German market such as Ich War Noch Niemals in New York, Hinterm Horizont and Der Schuh des Manitu.

Stage Entertainment together with ID&T started a joint venture in 2005 to produce a German version of Sensation White, the combination was unsuccessful and therefore dissolved after only two years. Stage Entertainment produced a version of Hamilton in Germany. It went off stage in 2023.

=== United Kingdom ===
After The Netherlands, the United States of America and Germany the company opened an office in London's West End in 2002, where they produced shows like Fame and Blue Man Group. Adam Spiegel Productions was acquired in 2006, the year after the acquisition the company signed a long-term lease for the Shaftesbury Theatre, for their production of Hairspray. Adam Spiegel and Stage Entertainment went their separate ways in the early 2010s, both remaining active on West End.

=== Spain ===
Joop van den Ende entered the Spanish market in 2003 via a joint venture with the already in Spain active CIE, the combination lasted until 2005 when Stage Entertainment acquired CIE's stake and becoming sole owner. They majority of the productions were played in Teatro Coliseum and Teatro Lope de Vega in Madrid, which they rented. Together with Rockspring the two theaters were acquired in 2017, the company is also actively looking for a third theater in Madrid to acquire.

=== Russian Federation ===
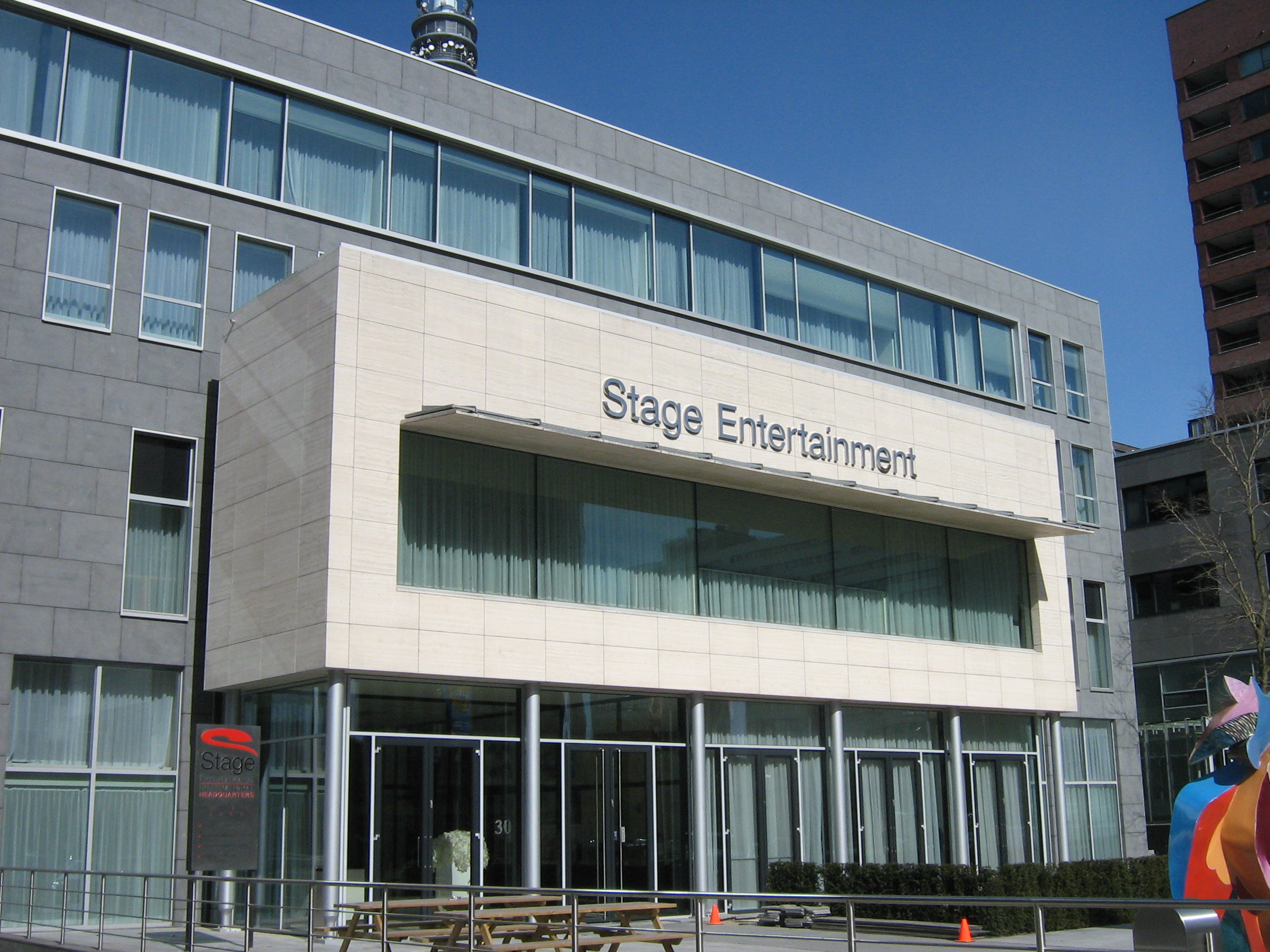
Stage Entertainment Headquarters in Amsterdam

The Russian market was entered in 2004 with a lease of the MDM Theatre in Moscow, with a second theater that followed in 2012 the Rossia Theatre. After the acquisition by Advance Publication in 2018 no new shows were produced and the leases on both theaters weren't renewed, ending the Russian activities although this was never confirmed by the company.

=== France ===
Stage Entertainment acquired Théâtre Mogador in 2005 and refurbished it until 2007, when they reopened it with The Lion King. The company also often rents other theaters for their productions, like Les Folies Bergère in 2006 for Cabaret.

=== Italy ===
Due to the acquisition of Teatro Nazionale in Milan the company could enter the Italian market, mirroring their approach in other countries. After a renovation the theater reopened in 2009 with Beauty and the Beast. From 2009 til 2012 the company also operated a theatre in Rome, but this lease wasn't renewed. In 2016 Stage Entertainment acquired a second theatre in Milan, Teatro Lirico, with a planned opening in 2021.

== Theaters ==
Stage Entertainment owns / operates as of July 2023 17 theaters in 5 European countries.
Theater	City	Opening by SE (Built)	Show	Note	Image
Stage Theater des Westens	Berlin	2003 (1896)	Wir sind am Leben	Acquired in 2002, the building remains property of the city of Berlin.	
Stage Bluemax Theater	Berlin	2007	Blue Man Group	Acquired in 2006	
Stage Theater Neue Flora	Hamburg	2002 (1990)	Tarzan		
Stage Operettenhaus	Hamburg	2002 (1986)	Zurück in die Zukunft	Leased in the period 2002–2011, acquired in 2011.	
Stage Theater an der Elbe	Hamburg	2014	MJ	Built by Stage Entertainment.	
Stage Theater im Hafen	Hamburg	2000 (1994)	The Lion King		
Theater Kehrwieder	Hamburg	2005	Vacant		
Teatro Coliseum	Madrid	2003	Aladdin	Leased in the period 2003–2017, acquired in 2017 in partnership with Rockspring.	
Teatro Lope de Vega	Madrid	2003	The Lion King	Leased in the period 2003–2017, acquired in 2017 in partnership with Rockspring.	
Teatro Stage	Madrid	2026	t.b.d.	Set to open in 2026 after remodeling a former IMAX theatre.	
Teatro Nazionale	Milan	2009 (1924)	Chicago	Acquired in 2006.	
Teatro Lirico	Milan	2021 (1779)	Various	Acquired in 2008.	
Théâtre Mogador	Paris	2007 (1913)	The Lion King	Acquired in 2006.	
Stage Palladium Theater	Stuttgart	2002 (1997)	We Will Rock You		
Stage Apollo Theater	Stuttgart	2002 (1994)	Frozen		
AFAS Circustheater	The Hague	1991 (1904)	Frozen		
Beatrix Theater	Utrecht	1999	Moulin Rouge	Longterm leased from Jaarbeurs	

== Former assets ==
=== Theaters ===
Stage Entertainment owned / leased 11 theaters in the past.
Theater	City	Opening by SE - Closing	Note	Image
New World Stages	New York City	2006-2014	Sold to The Shubert Organization.	
Stage Colosseum Theater	Essen	2001-2020	Sold to RAG-Stiftung and E.ON.	
Stage Theater am Potsdamer Platz	Berlin	2002-2016/2020	Vacant since 2016. Lease was supposed to end in 2022, but was taken over by Live Nation in 2020.	
Werk7 Theater	Munich	2018-2019	Closed	
Theater Fabriek Amsterdam	Amsterdam	2004-2014	Closed	
MDM Theatre	Moscow	2006-2018	Lease ended	
Rossiya Theatre	Moscow	2012-2017	Lease ended	
Teatro Brancaccio	Rome	2009-2012	Lease ended	
Teatro Alcalá	Madrid	2003-2016	Lease ended	
Shaftesbury Theatre	London	2007-2010	Lease ended	
Stage Metronom Theater	Oberhausen	2005-2024	Vacant since 2020. Sold in 2024 to Semmel Concerts.	

=== Ticketing ===
After the launch of a dedicated reservation line in 1990 in The Netherlands, the company also set up similar systems in the countries they entered in continental Europe. Stage Entertainment acquired the U.K. based See Tickets from the Really Useful Group in 2008, merged it with its own ticket company and renamed it See Tickets International, 60% of the new company was sold in the same year to Parcon Ventures.

CTS Eventim announced in 2010 it had acquired the German part of See Tickets for €145 million. In February 2011 Parcom sold its stakes in the Dutch, Belgium, French, Austrian and Spanish operations to Stage Entertainment after which Parcom became the sole owner of See Tickets UK, which it sold in 2011 to Vivendi for £94 million. In 2014 CTS Eventim and Stage Entertainment reached an agreement for the sell of their remaining ticket companies.

=== Holiday On Ice ===
The Live Entertainment Division of Endemol acquired Holiday On Ice in 1996, after the separation of Endemol and the live entertainment division the company operated as a separated entity within Stage Entertainment. After a reorganisation in 2011 the company was placed in a new division called Stage Entertainment Touring Productions. In 2014 Stage Entertainment and CTS Eventim entered into a new joint venture when CTS Eventim acquired a 50% stake in Holiday On Ice/Stage Entertainment Touring Productions, two years later CTS Eventim acquired the remaining shares.

== See also ==
- List of Stage Entertainment productions
