= West German Chamber Plays =

Former chamber play theatre

The West German Chamber Plays – Theatre of the Youth (German: Westdeutsche Kammerspiele – Theater der Jugend) was a West German chamber play theatre located in Frankfurt. It opened in 1950 and was directed by the lyrical tenor Erwin Sachse-Steuernagel and with Else Rassow (1884–1973), the former head of the Freilichtspiele Schwäbisch Hall, as chair of the board of directors. The first play performed by the ensemble was Das Apostelspiel. It was located in Jaspertstraße 46 and was organised as a non-profit society.
