= Valley Fair =

Valley Fair may refer to:

- Westfield Valley Fair, a shopping mall straddling the border of San Jose and Santa Clara, California.
- Valleyfair, a theme park in Shakopee, Minnesota.
- Valley Fair Shopping Center, a shopping mall which existed in Appleton, Wisconsin from 1954 until 2007.
