= Brauns =

Brauns is a surname. Notable people with the surname include:

- Axel Brauns (born 1963), German writer and filmmaker
- Hans Brauns (1857–1929), German zoologist
- Heinrich Brauns (1868–1939), German theologian and politician
- Mārtiņš Brauns (1951–2021), Latvian composer and musician
- Valdis Brauns (born 1945), Latvian photographer

== See also ==
- Christopher & Banks, American retailer, formerly known as Brauns or Brauns Fashions
