= Kathrin Klamroth =

German mathematician and computer scientist

Kathrin Klamroth (born 1968) is a German mathematician and computer scientist whose research topics include combinatorial optimization and facility location. She is a professor in the department of mathematics and computer science at the University of Wuppertal.

== Education and career ==
Klamroth earned her doctorate at the Technical University of Braunschweig in 1994. Her dissertation, Ramsey-Zahlen für Mengen von Graphen (Ramsey numbers for sets of graphs) was supervised by Ingrid Mengersen. She completed her habilitation in 2002 at the University of Kaiserslautern, and took a faculty position at the University of Erlangen-Nuremberg. In 2008, she moved to her present position at the University of Wuppertal.

== Books ==
Klamroth is a coauthor of a bilingual textbook, Lineare und Netzwerk-Optimierung/Linear and network optimization (with Horst Hamacher, Vieweg, 2000) and the author of the monograph Single-facility location problems with barriers (Springer, 2002).

== Recognition ==
In 2019, the International Society on Multiple Criteria Decision Making gave Klamroth their Georg Cantor Award, in recognition of her contributions to the theory and methodology of multiple criteria decision making.
