= Hans Brauns =

- Born: Johannes Heinrich Justus Carl Ernst Brauns; March 21, 1857; Vlotho, Kingdom of Prussia
- Died: February 3, 1929 (aged 71); Willowmore, South Africa
- Scientific career
- Fields: Medicine, Entomology
- Author abbrev. (zoology): Brauns

Johannes Heinrich Justus Carl Ernst Brauns (21 March 1857 – 3 February 1929), more known as Hans Brauns, was a German physician and entomologist.

Born in Vlotho, Kingdom of Prussia, Brauns qualified as Doctor of Medicine in 1894 at the University of Leipzig. He moved to Cape Colony in 1895, where he practiced medicine and collected insects whenever possible. Most of his entomological research focused on insects of the order Hymenoptera.
