= Valley Fair Shopping Center =

Valley Fair Mall
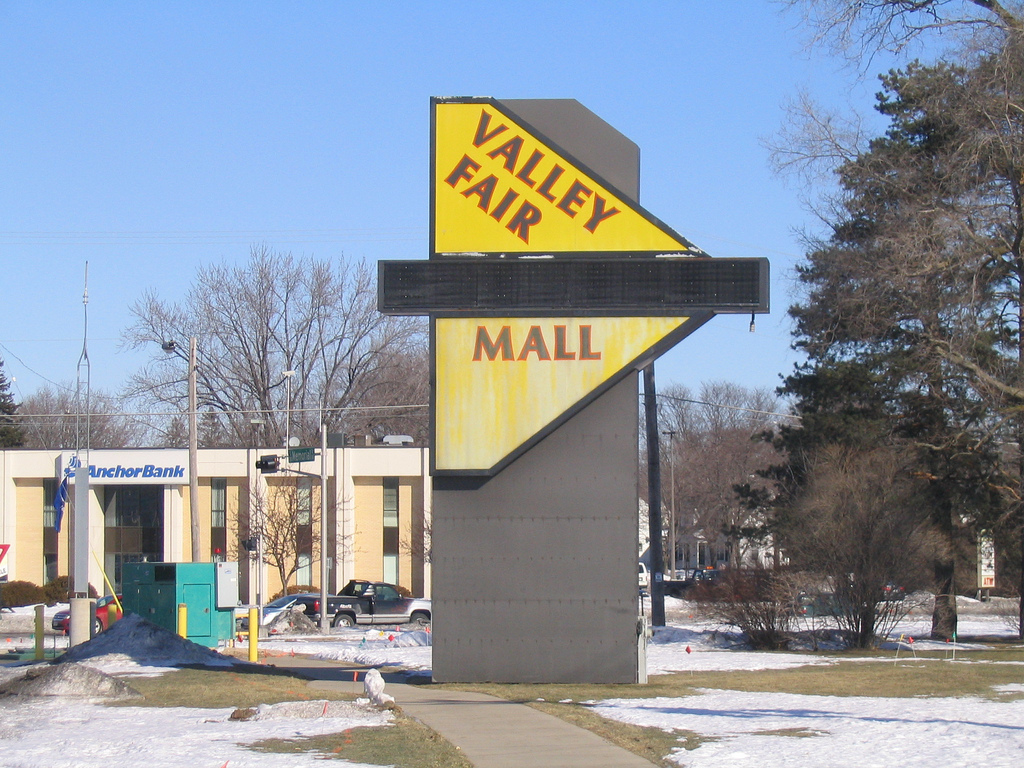
- The Valley Fair Sign
- Location: Appleton, Wisconsin, US
- Coordinates: 44°14′27.6″N 88°24′56.1″W
- Opened: March 10, 1955
- Closed: 2007
- Developer: Hoffman Shopping Centers, Incorporated
- Owner: VF Partners
- Architect: George Narovec
- Num. of stores: 55 (At mall's peak)
- Num. of anchor tenants: 2 (At mall's peak)
- Floor area: 265,400 sq ft (24,660 m^{2}) (At mall's peak)
- Floors: 1
- Public transit: Valley Transit

The Valley Fair Shopping Center, Valley Fair Mall, or Valley Fair Center was a shopping mall in Appleton, in the U.S. state of Wisconsin that opened on March 10, 1955. This enclosed mall was the first weather-protected mall to ever be built within the United States, and was the first enclosed mall to open. Demolition of parts of the shopping center began on August 8, 2007.

== History ==
Construction on Valley Fair began on July 1, 1953. It was located in the town of Menasha, Wisconsin until the land on which it stood was annexed to Appleton. The mall was built by Hamilton Construction Company under the name Hoffman Shopping Centers, Inc. Designed by George Narovec of Appleton, it was one of the first malls in Wisconsin to be enclosed. The mall's grand opening was March 10, 1955. It opened fully on August 11, 1955. The mall originally had six stores: Krambo Supermarkets (renamed Kroger), House of Camera & Cards, Badger Paint & Hardware, Donald's, Hamilton Bakery and Eddie's Self-Service Liquor.

The next two years saw further expansion in phases, fronted on the eastern end by a W. T. Grant discount store. With this, the mall was fully completed by 1956. It remained relatively unchanged through 1976, when the Grant's anchor ceased with the rest of the entire chain.

In a huge expansion and renovation project in 1978-1979, the mall re-tenanted, with less emphasis on local businesses and more on nationally known tenants. This project included:

- An extension of the east wing of the mall, going through the former W.T. Grant store. Space was created for 15-20 new shops, most of them national chains. Included were Brauns, RadioShack, Fanny Farmer, Thom McAn, Walgreens, Woolworth's, and Hallmark Cards. This section fronted a huge Kohl's Department Store/Supermarket combo, one of four built north of Milwaukee. Kohl's Department Store at Valley Fair eventually closed near the end of the 1990s, with new replacement stores opening near Darboy (a suburb in the Southeast corner of Appleton) and another one in Neenah.
- A new Marcus 3-screen cineplex was built onto the rear of the mall adjacent to Center Court. In the late 1980s they were divided to create a 6-screen cineplex.
- Alterations were done to the older 1950s portion of the mall to blend it into the newer section, including new carpeting laid atop the original concrete flooring, new lighting fixtures and exterior signage.

Through the 1980s and early 1990s, the mall changed ownership several times. Foot traffic started to decrease when Northland Mall on the north side of Appleton completed a major expansion. Another 15 stores in an existing 1960s-era strip were also connected to Kohl's, creating a rare instance of a hybrid strip/enclosed mall. Dartmouth Clothing & Lady Dartmouth (based in Ashwaubenon, Wisconsin) opened a store in the Valley Fair Mall during the early 1980s. It eventually closed and re-opened under the name American Clothiers. Another attraction was the addition of Pedro's, at the time one of the first places in northeast Wisconsin to serve authentic Mexican food. Pedro's was eventually purchased by George Wall and the name changed to Sergio's Mexican Bar & Grill.

This was followed by Fox River Mall opening in 1984 in Grand Chute, a suburb of Appleton. Tenants started to relocate to both malls as leases came up, though others would stick it out up through the late 1990s.

== YouthFutures ==
YouthFutures was a non-profit, Christian-oriented organization created in 2002. Buying out the mall, it started to re-tenant a third time, removing all the national chains that were left, and refocusing on local tenants that were more family-oriented in nature. The former Kohl's building was split between an indoor skateboarding park, and a gathering place for teens, where local bands played on weekends. This venture would have created the nation's first functioning "youth mall" had it taken off, but it was bogged down by the high costs for heating and cooling the nearly 50-year-old structure, and remodeling was far beyond their financial reach.

== Redevelopment ==
YouthFutures sold the mall on March 30, 2006 to "VF Partners", a partnership between Commercial Horizons, Rollie Winter and Associates, and Bomier, for $2.3 million. "VF Partners" has been redeveloping the 26-acre, Valley Fair site since 2006. They have demolished most of the property. Because the former Kohl's Food Stores building, the Chase Bank, and the Marcus Cinemas, were still new enough and structurally sound, they weren't torn down. In September 2007, the former Valley Fair site and surrounding blocks were placed into a tax district by the city council to facilitate improvement of the site and the surrounding area. Valley Fair Partners is recreating the Valley Fair site so that individual new buildings, rather than one single structure, are located closer to Memorial Drive, WIS - 47, and parking is located behind them. This design reverses the current layout of parking in front, building in back. The association has been calling the shopping center site Valley Fair Center, instead of Valley Fair Mall. Copps Food Center demolished the Kohl's Department Store section and built a new Copps Supermarket in its place, which includes a pharmacy. The new supermarket was to replace their old location at 1919 East Calumet Street; the new building is about 70,000 sq ft (6,500 m^{2}). However, the Kohl's Foods portion of the former Kohl's building has been redeveloped as a strip mall.

In late August 2015, Marcus Theaters announced the Valley Value Cinema would close soon and it played its final movie on Monday September 7, 2015. The cinema was using reel film and the owners didn't transition to digital format.

== Access ==
- WIS-441/US-10 from either east or west to WIS-47 northbound
- Memorial Drive (WIS 47) from either north or south
- Calumet Street from the east

== Images ==
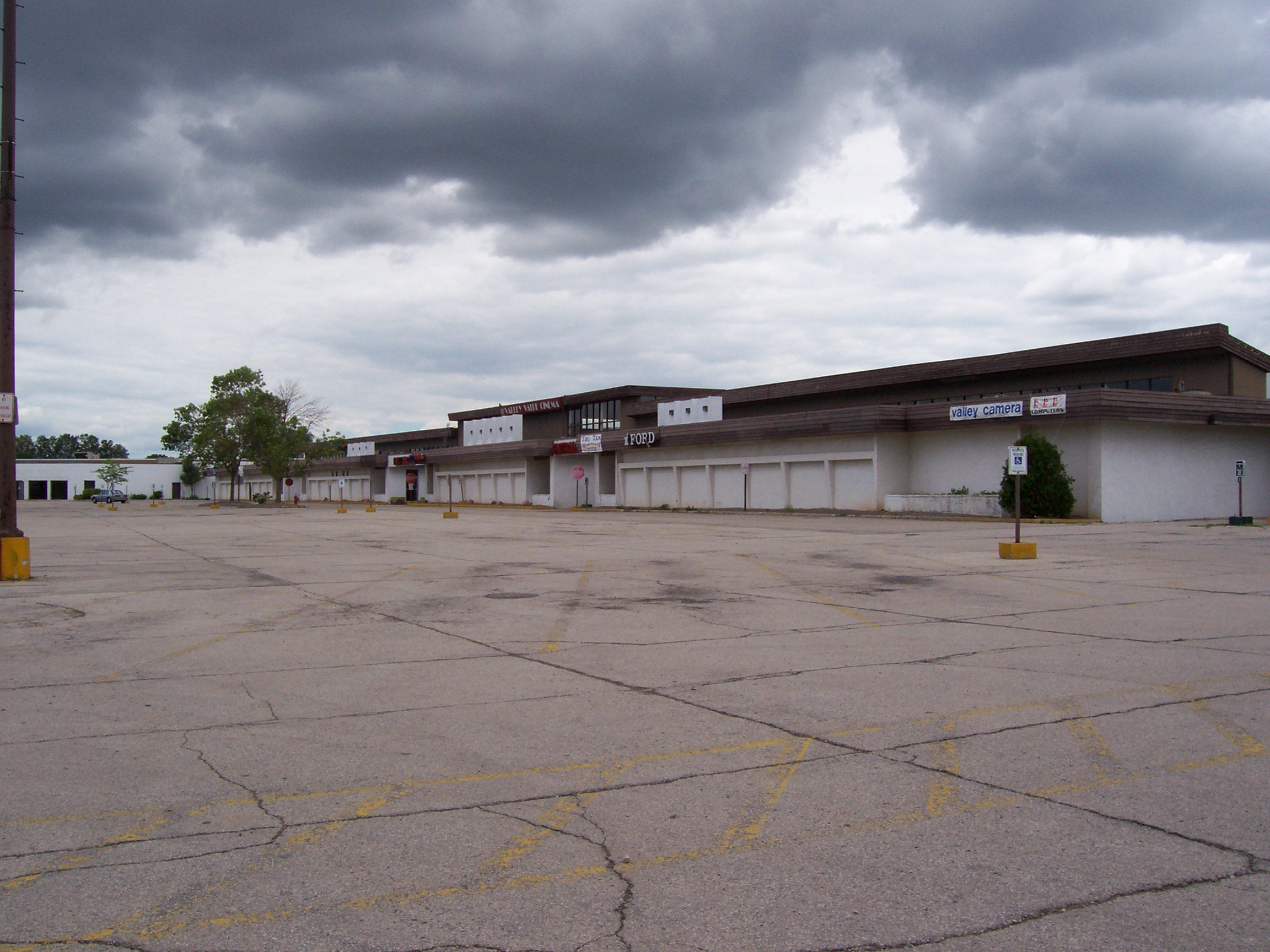
West Wing of Valley Fair Mall

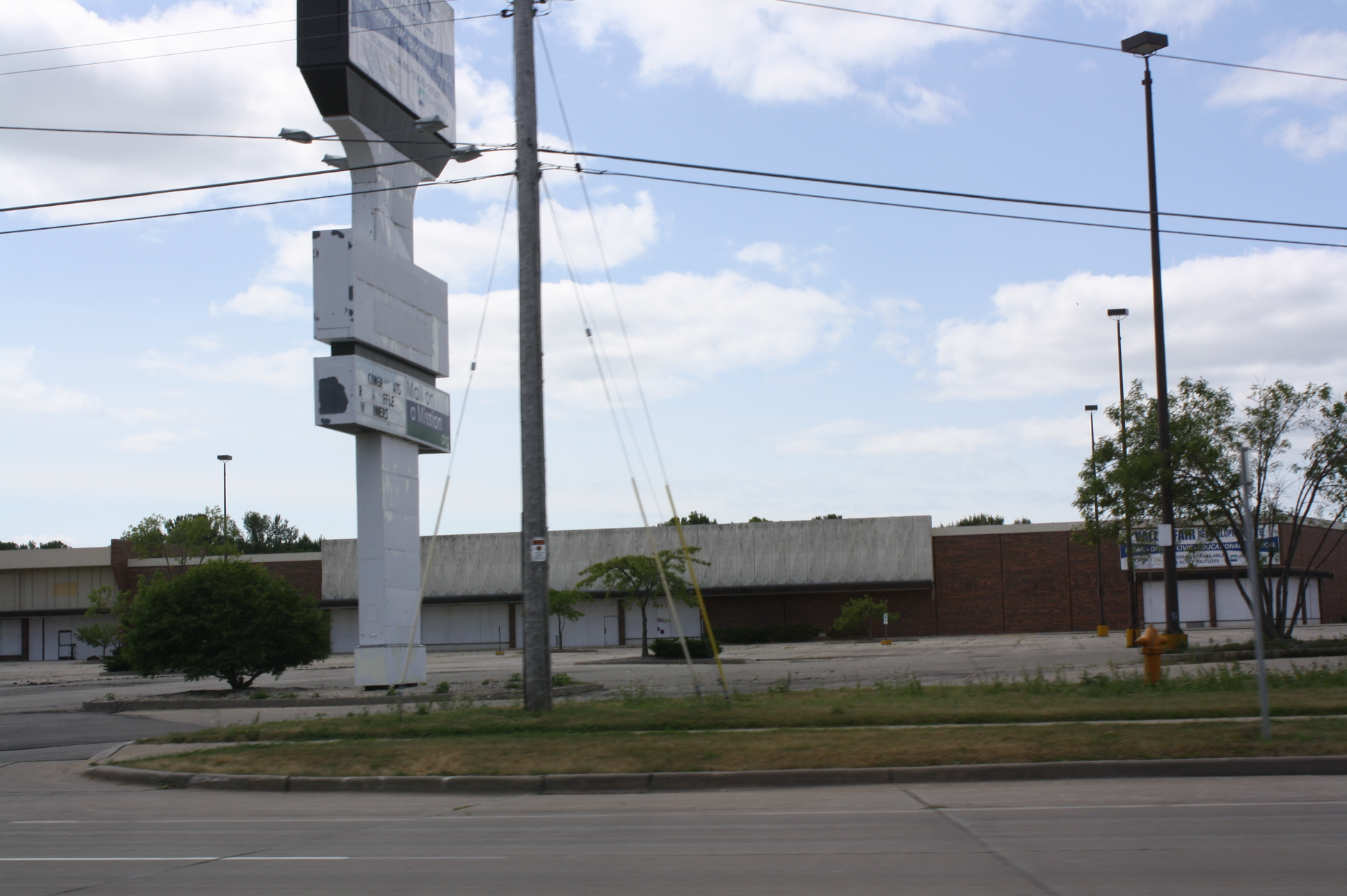
Former Kohl's building (now Copps Food Center)

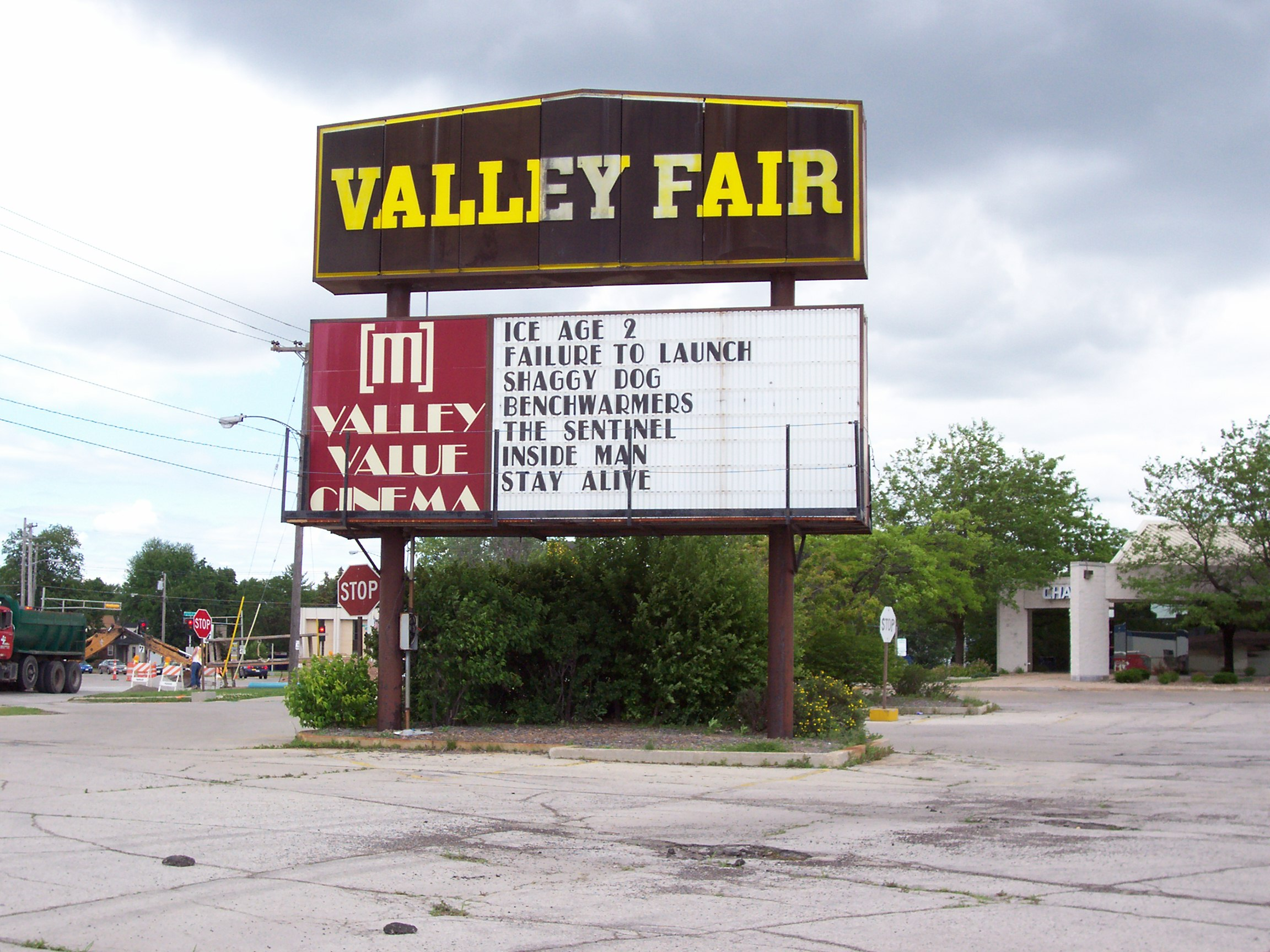
One of Two Valley Fair signs

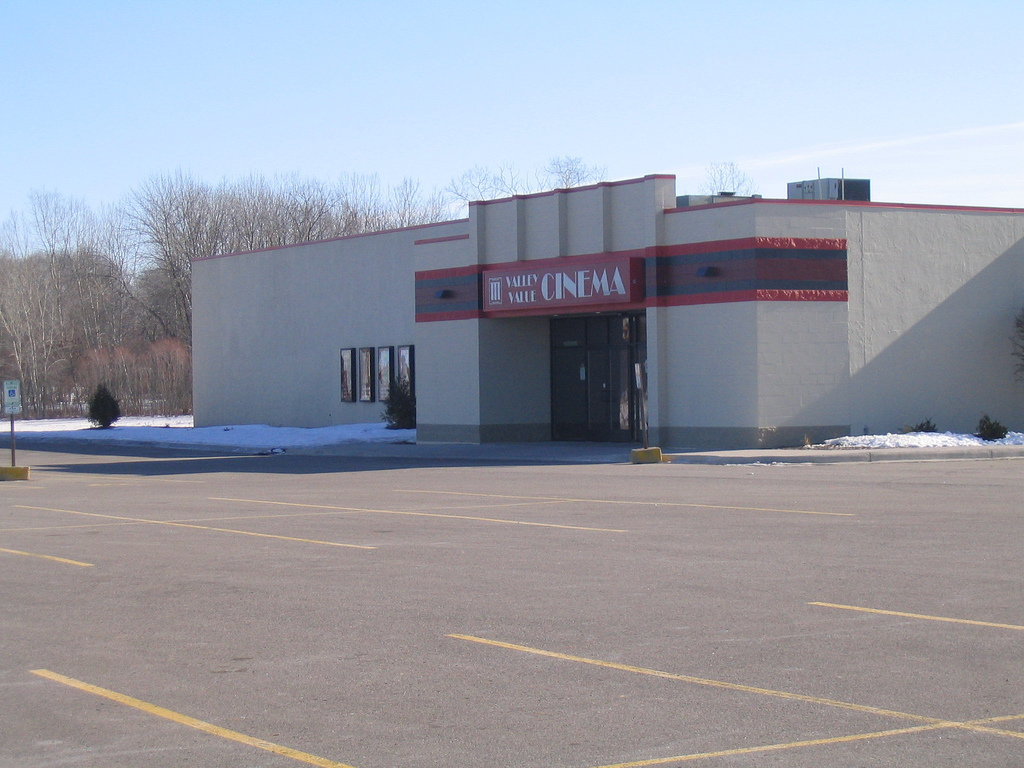
The Marcus Valley Value Cinema of Valley Fair

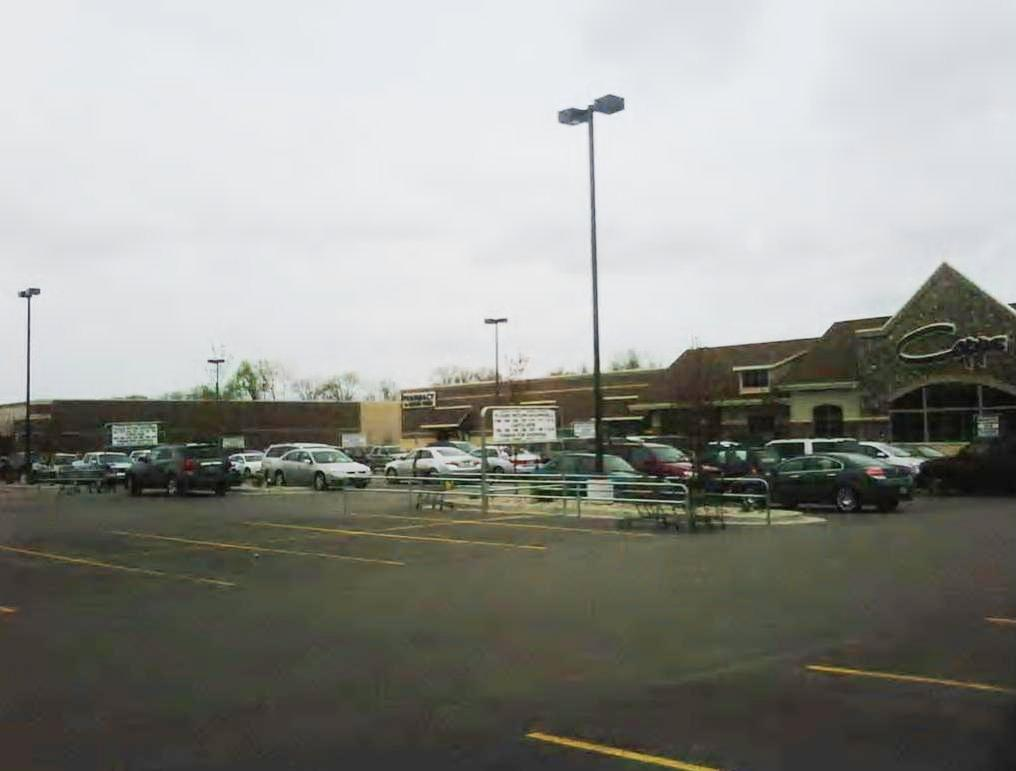
A new Copps Food Center (former Kohl's Building)

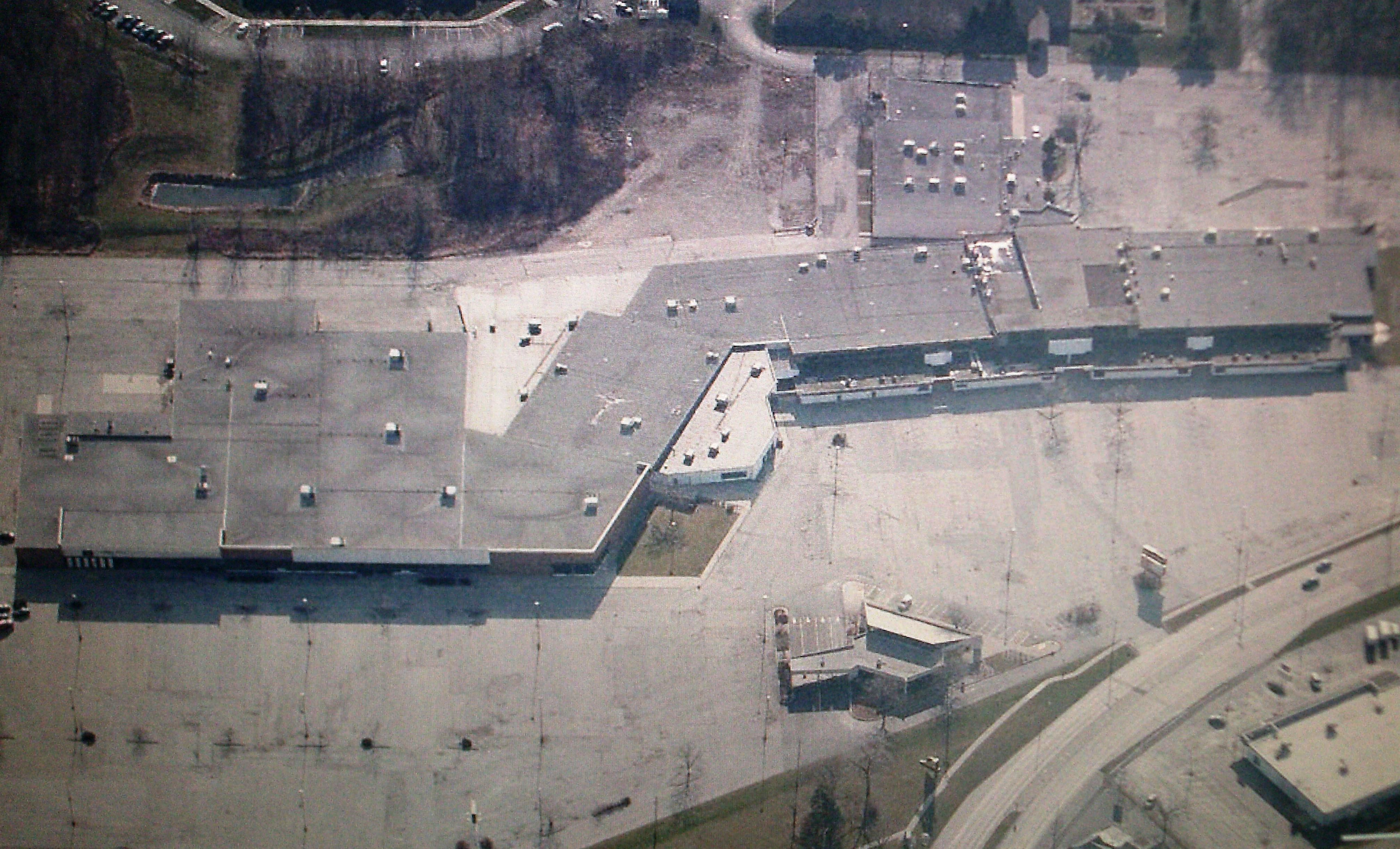
2006 Aerial Photo of Mall

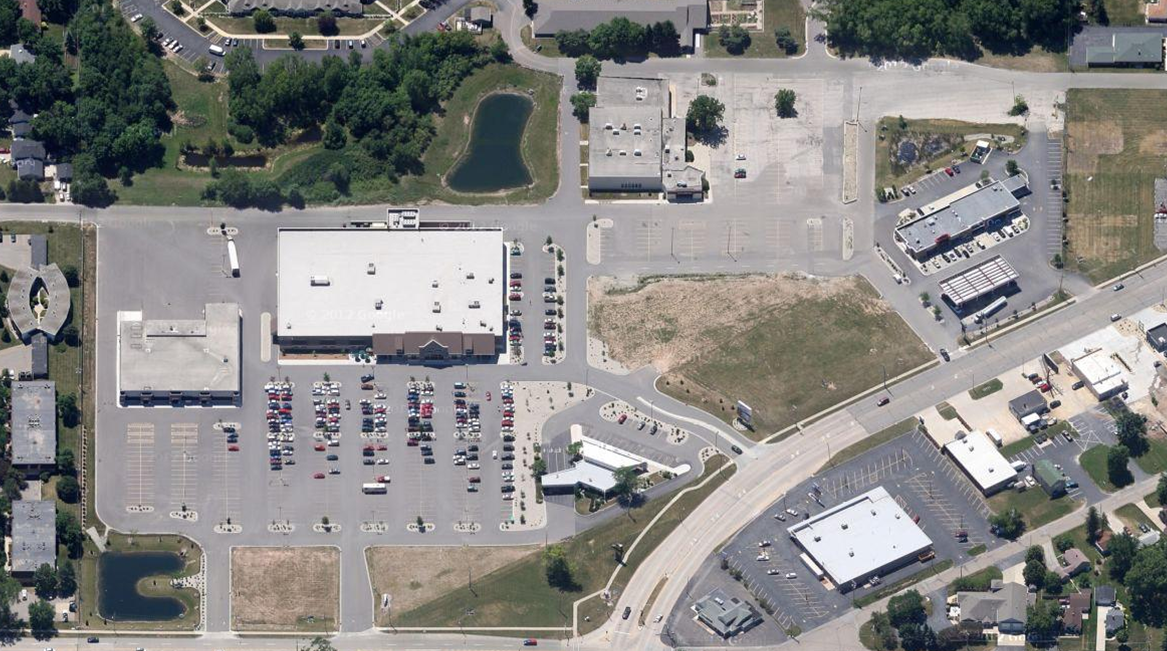
Aerial view of Valley Fair Shopping Center as of 2012
