= Valdis Brauns =

Soviet and Latvian photographer

- Born: March 27, 1945 (age 81); Ugale, Ventspils Municipality, Latvia
- Other name: Valdis Braunas
- Occupation: photographer
- Awards: EFIAP^{[fr]} (1990)

Valdis Brauns (born March 27, 1945) is a Soviet and Latvian photographer, participant and prize-winner of international exhibitions.

== Biography ==
He was born March 27, 1945. Since 1966 he served in the ranks of the Soviet Army. There he began to study the theory of photography and take the first professional pictures.

Participated in more than 280 international exhibitions, has 142 awards. Awarded the title of EFIAP^{[fr]} of the Fédération Internationale de l'Art Photographique.

The works of Valdis Brauns are in the collections of FIAP, the French photographic museum Bjevr, the Latvian Museum of Photography, the Siauliai Museum of Photography (Lithuania), the Spanish Museum of Photography (Catalonia), in private collections in the US, Germany, Russia, the Czech Republic, Hungary, India and Lithuania.

Lives and works in Riga.
