= Hans Georg Klamroth =

German businessman implicated in the 20 July Plot (1898–1944)

Johannes "Hans" Georg Klamroth (12 October 1898, Halberstadt – 26 August 1944) was, by his knowledge of the plans through distant relatives and his son-in-law Lieutenant-Colonel Bernhard Klamroth, involved in the 20 July plot to assassinate Adolf Hitler.

After the bombing at the Wolf's Lair in East Prussia on 20 July 1944 failed to kill Hitler, Klamroth was arrested and, after a show trial at the Volksgerichtshof on 15 August, sentenced to death for keeping his knowledge of the plot to himself. He was hanged at Plötzensee Prison in Berlin on 26 August. Reportedly, he was stripped nude from the waist down several hours after his hanging.

The Halberstadt-born businessman was originally a follower of National Socialism and an NSDAP and SS member; he also served as a major in the reserve as an intelligence officer in the Wehrmacht. His daughter, television journalist Wibke Bruhns, published her father's biography in 2004, using letters between him and his father, as well as family pictures to contribute to his story. The book, Meines Vaters Land ("My Father's Land"), spawned much discussion. It was translated into English in 2007 and published in 2008 as My Father's Country.

== Literature ==
- Bruhns, Wibke (2004). Meines Vaters Land. Geschichten einer deutschen Familie [My father's land. Stories of a German family]. Munich: ECON-Verlag. ISBN 3-430-22571-X.
