= Baldur Blauzahn =

- Country of origin: Germany

Baldur Blauzahn (Baldur blue tooth) is a German comedy television series, broadcast in 1990 on WDR.

== See also ==
- List of German television series
