= Rocky the Musical =

- 2012 Hamburg poster
- Music: Stephen Flaherty
- Lyrics: Lynn Ahrens
- Book: Thomas Meehan; Sylvester Stallone
- Setting: 1975 Philadelphia
- Basis: Rocky by Sylvester Stallone
- Premiere: 18 November 2012: Operettenhaus, Hamburg
- Productions: 2012 Hamburg; 2014 Broadway

Rocky the Musical (originally Rocky: Das Musical) is a 2012 musical with music by Stephen Flaherty, lyrics by Lynn Ahrens, and a book by Thomas Meehan and Sylvester Stallone, based on the 1976 film of the same name written by Stallone. The show held its world premiere in Hamburg in 2012 and opened on Broadway in 2014 at the Winter Garden Theatre.

== Background ==
The musical is based on the 1976 film Rocky, with a screenplay by Sylvester Stallone. The film itself was made on a budget of $1,075,000, shot in 28 days and was a sleeper hit, earning $225 million in global box office receipts becoming the highest-grossing film of 1976 and went on to win three Oscars, including Best Picture. Having been in the works for eight years, a workshop was held in New York City in April 2011, with Andy Karl playing Rocky and Lisa Brescia playing Adrian. Following the reading it was officially confirmed in November by producer Sylvester Stallone alongside boxers and co-producers Vitali and Wladimir Klitschko, that the show would receive its world premiere in Hamburg in November 2012.

The musical, which premiere production cost around $20 million to produce, has a book by Thomas Meehan and Sylvester Stallone, adapted from Stallone's screenplay, and is directed by Alex Timbers, with choreography by Kelly Devine, boxing choreography by Steven Hoggett, set design by Christopher Barreca, costume design by David Zinn, lighting design by Christopher Akerlind, sound design by Peter Hylenski, video design by Pablo N. Molina and special effects by Jeremy Chernick. A mostly original score has been penned, by Lynn Ahrens with music by Stephen Flaherty.

The show's set, which for Broadway cost $4.3 million, is set around a mostly bare stage which represents the Gym that Rocky trains in. The production uses sliding box-like sets to represent the homes of the characters and the sliding element goes on to include a full sized regulation boxing ring. Audience members seated within the front stalls Golden Circle seating section, are escorted onto the stage for the final 20 minutes to sit on bleacher style seats, in doing so this allows the boxing ring to enter the auditorium and sit in rows A-F, bringing the audience close to the final fight scene.

== Production history ==
=== Hamburg (2012) ===
Rocky the Musical received its world premiere on 18 November 2012, at the Operettenhaus, Hamburg. The production opened to positive reviews and title casting included Drew Sarich as Rocky Balboa, Wietske van Tongeren playing Adrian Pennino and Terence Archie playing Apollo Creed. Having been written in English, the show was translated into German for its world premiere.

=== Broadway (2014) ===
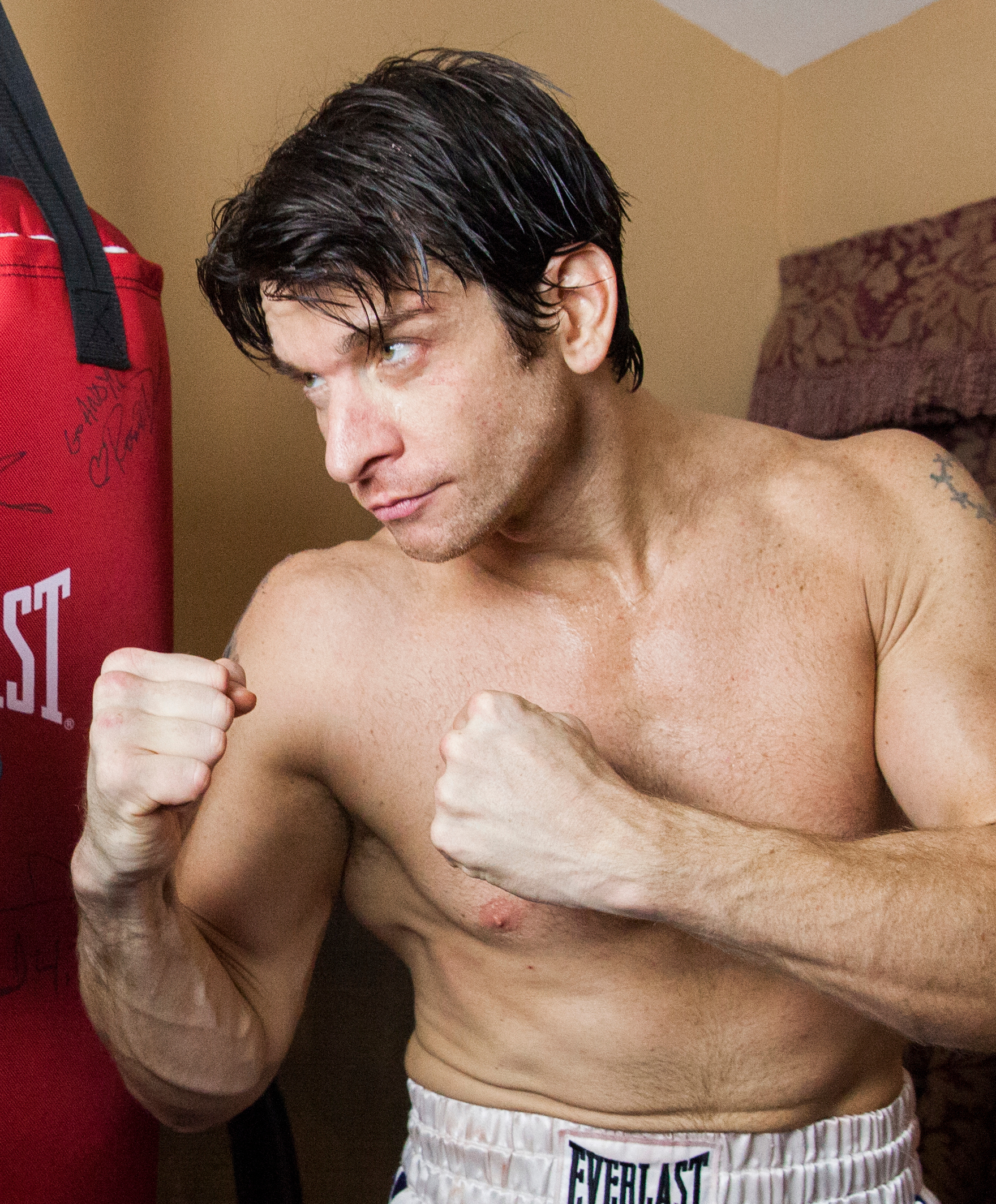
Andy Karl as Rocky Balboa.

On 28 April 2013, it was announced the show would transfer to Broadway in February 2014. The show was expected to open on 13 March 2014, at the Winter Garden Theatre, with previews commencing on 11 February 2014. The first preview was cancelled as a result of delayed technical rehearsals, due to power problems in the area. Following a scheduled rehearsal day, previews commenced on 13 February. The cast included Andy Karl as Rocky, Margo Seibert as Adrian and Terence Archie transferring from the Hamburg production, to reprise his role as Apollo Creed. Dakin Matthews, Danny Mastrogiorgio, Jennifer Mudge and Okieriete Onaodowan were also in the cast in supporting roles. The cast performed as part of the ceremony for the 68th Tony Awards in June 2014. The show was expected to close on 17 August 2014, after a run of 28 previews and 188 performances.

=== Prague (2017) ===
Rocky the Musical came to Prague for a short 4-to-5 month run. It was performed at the Prague Congress Centre.

=== Brazil (2025) ===
Rocky the Musical came to Brazil for a short run, opening in March 2025 and closing May 2025. It was performed at the 033 Rooftop, in an immersive production.

== Music ==
The show features 20 original songs, with additional music taken from the original film series including "Eye of the Tiger" and "Gonna Fly Now".

=== Musical numbers ===
Act I

- "Ain't Down Yet" - Company
- "My Nose Ain't Broken" - Rocky
- "Raining" - Adrian
- "Patriotic" - Apollo Creed, Miles Jergens, Apollo Girls
- "My Nose Ain't Broken (Reprise)" - Rocky
- "The Flip Side" - Rocky, Adrian
- "Adrian" - Rocky
- "Wanna Know Why" - Gazzo, Buddy, Rocky, Mickey
- "Fight From the Heart" - Rocky
- "One of Us" - Company

Act II

- "Training Montage #1" - Company
- "In the Ring" - Mickey
- "Training Montage #2" - Company
- "Happiness" - Rocky, Adrian
- "I'm Done" - Adrian
- "Southside Celebrity" - Company
- "Adrian (Reprise)" - Adrian
- "Keep On Standing" - Rocky
- "Undefeated Man"- Apollo, Entourage
- "The Fight" - Company

== Principal roles and original cast ==
Character	Original Hamburg Cast	Original Stuttgart Cast	Original Broadway Cast
Rocky Balboa	Drew Sarich	Nikolas Heiber	Andy Karl
Adrian Pennino	Wietske van Tongeren	Lucy Scherer	Margo Seibert
Apollo Creed	Terence Archie	Gino Emnes	Terence Archie
Mickey Goldmill	Uwe Drewes	Norbert Lamla	Dakin Matthews
Paulie Pennino	Patrick Imhof	Alexander Brugnara	Danny Mastrogiorgio
Gloria	Alex Avenell	Rosalie de Jong	Jennifer Mudge

== Reception ==
=== Critical response ===
The Hamburg production of Rocky the Musical received positive reviews from critics.

=== Accolades ===
==== Original Broadway production ====
Year	Award	Category	Nominee	Result
2014	Tony Award			
2014	Tony Award	Best Actor in a Musical	Andy Karl	Nominated
2014	Tony Award	Best Choreography	Steven Hoggett and Kelly Devine	Nominated
2014	Tony Award	Best Scenic Design	Christopher Barreca	Won
2014	Tony Award	Best Lighting Design	Christopher Akerlind	Nominated
2014	Drama Desk Award	Outstanding Musical		Nominated
2014	Drama Desk Award	Outstanding Actor in a Musical	Andy Karl	Nominated
2014	Drama Desk Award	Outstanding Director of a Musical	Alex Timbers	Nominated
2014	Drama Desk Award	Outstanding Choreography	Steven Hoggett and Kelly Devine	Nominated
2014	Drama Desk Award	Outstanding Set Design	Christopher Barreca	Won
2014	Drama Desk Award	Outstanding Lighting Design	Christopher Akerlind	Won
2014	Drama Desk Award	Outstanding Sound Design	Peter Hylenski	Nominated
2014	Drama League Award	Distinguished Production of a Musical		Nominated
2014	Drama League Award	Distinguished Performance Award	Margo Seibert	Nominated
2014	Drama League Award	Distinguished Performance Award	Andy Karl	Nominated
2014	Outer Critics Circle Award	Outstanding Broadway Musical		Nominated
2014	Outer Critics Circle Award	Outstanding Book Of A Musical	Thomas Meehan	Nominated
2014	Outer Critics Circle Award	Outstanding Actor in a Musical	Andy Karl	Nominated
2014	Outer Critics Circle Award	Outstanding Direction of a Musical	Alex Timbers	Nominated
2014	Outer Critics Circle Award	Outstanding Choreography	Steven Hoggett and Kelly Devine	Nominated
2014	Outer Critics Circle Award	Outstanding Set Design	Christopher Barreca	Won
