= Operettenhaus =

Theatre in Hamburg, Germany

Coordinates: 53°32′58″N 9°58′01″E

Stage Operettenhaus
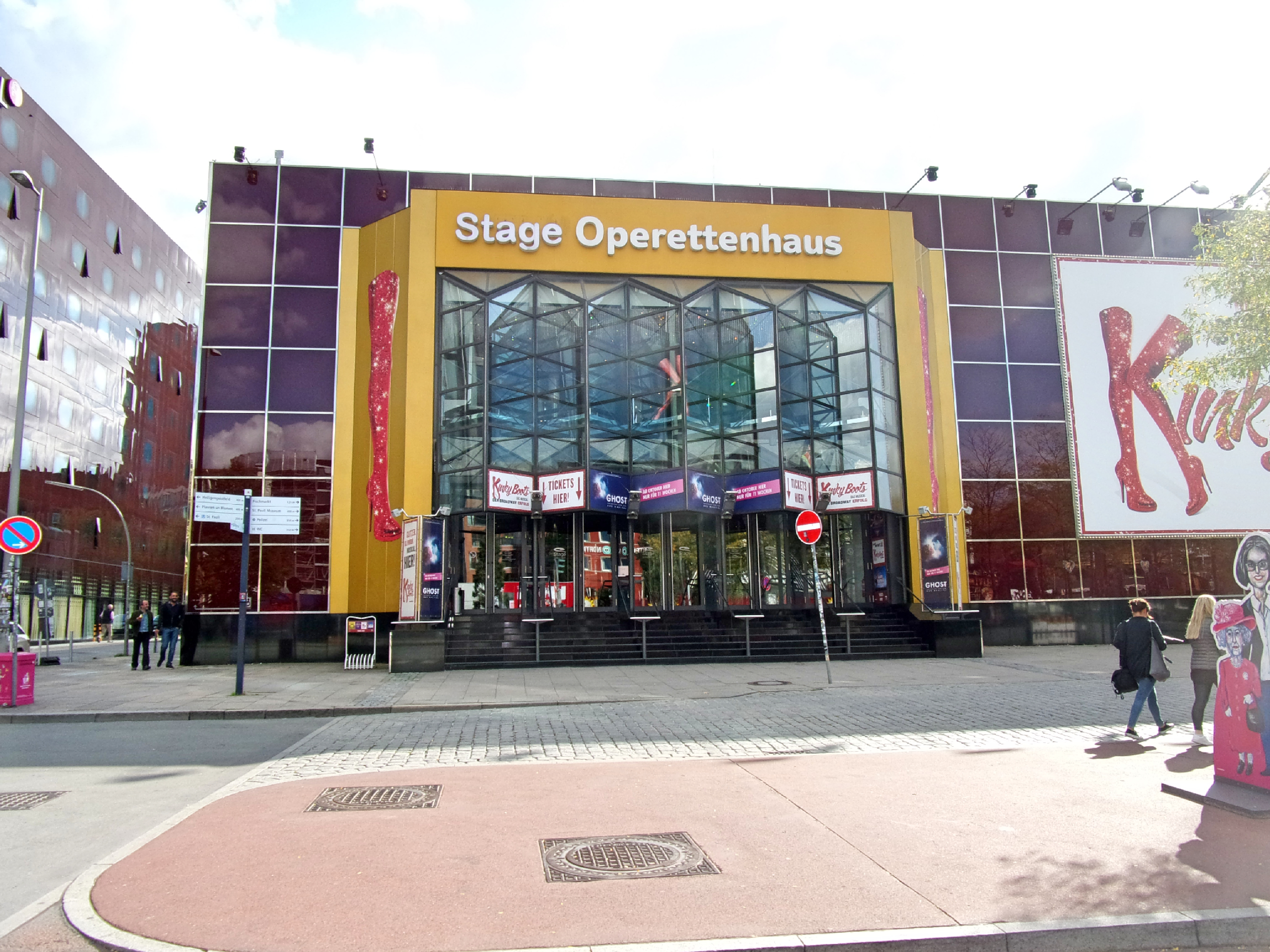
- Operettenhaus in 2018
- Interactive map of Stage Operettenhaus
- Address: Spielbudenplatz 1, 20359 Hamburg, Germany
- Owner: Stage Entertainment
- Capacity: 1,385
- Production: Hamilton

Website
- Stage Operettenhaus

Operettenhaus (Stage Operettenhaus) is a performing arts theatre in Hamburg, owned and operated by Stage Entertainment.

== History ==
In 1986, the theatre, leased by Stella Entertainment, opened with the Andrew Lloyed Webber musical Cats. In 2001 Stage Entertainment acquired 50% of the operation/lease of the theatre. After the bankruptcy of Stella in 2002, Stage Entertainment acquired several assets including the remaining shares of the lease of the Operettenhaus. Stage Entertainment acquired the theatre in 2011 from the city of Hamburg.

== Productions ==
Show	Start	End	Producer	Note
Cats	April 18, 1986	January 28, 2001	Stella Entertainment	German premiere
Fosse – Die Show	June 8, 2001	December 16, 2001	Stella Entertainment	German premiere
Oh, what a Night!	January 11, 2002	June 29, 2002	Stella Entertainment	German premiere
Emil und die Detektive	March 25, 2002	May 5, 2002	Stella Entertainment	
Mamma Mia!	November 3, 2002	September 8, 2007	Stage Entertainment	German premiere
Ich war noch niemals in New York	December 2, 2007	September 26, 2010	Stage Entertainment	World premiere
Sister Act	December 2, 2010	August 26, 2012	Stage Entertainment	German premiere
Rocky — Das Musical	November 18, 2012	August 19, 2015	Stage Entertainment	World premiere
Liebe stirbt nie	October 15, 2015	September 25, 2016	Stage Entertainment	German premiere
Hinterm Horizont	November 10, 2016	October 29, 2017	Stage Entertainment	
Kinky Boots	December 3, 2017	September 30, 2018	Stage Entertainment	German premiere
Ghost	October 28, 2018	January 13, 2019	Stage Entertainment	
Tina: The Tina Turner Musical	March 3, 2019	August 18, 2022	Stage Entertainment	German premiere
Hamilton	October 6, 2022	October 15, 2023	Stage Entertainment	German premiere
Tanz der Vampire	November 12, 2023	September 15, 2024	Stage Entertainment	
& Juliet	October 30, 2024	February 1, 2026	Stage Entertainment	German premiere
Zurück in die Zukunft	March 22, 2026		Stage Entertainment	German premiere
