= Colosseum Theater =

Performance venue in Essen, Germany

Coordinates: 51°27′32″N 7°00′09″E

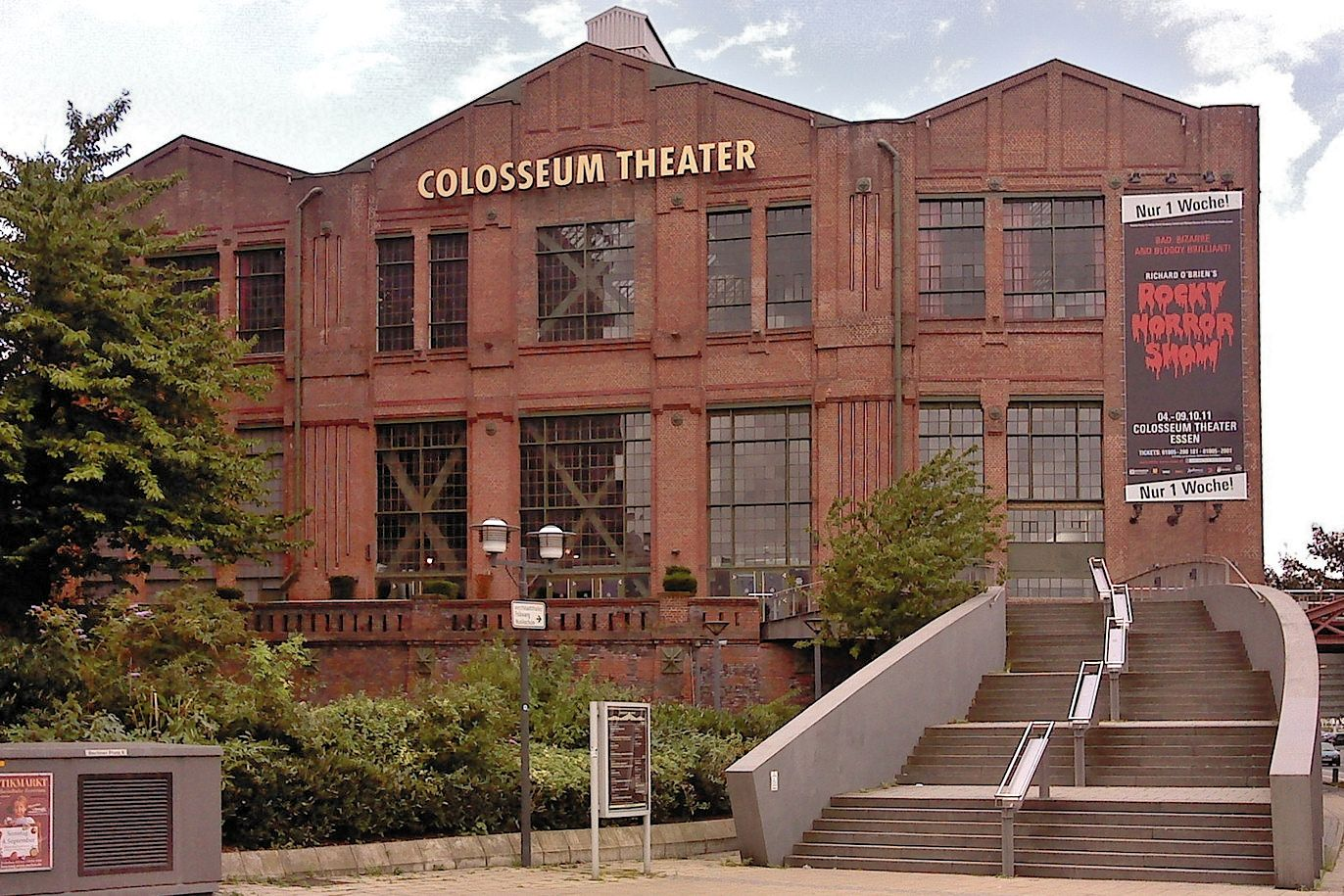
The theatre in 2011

Colosseum Theater is a performance venue in Essen, Germany.
