= Freilichtspiele Schwäbisch Hall =

Coordinates: 49.1106°N 9.7352°E

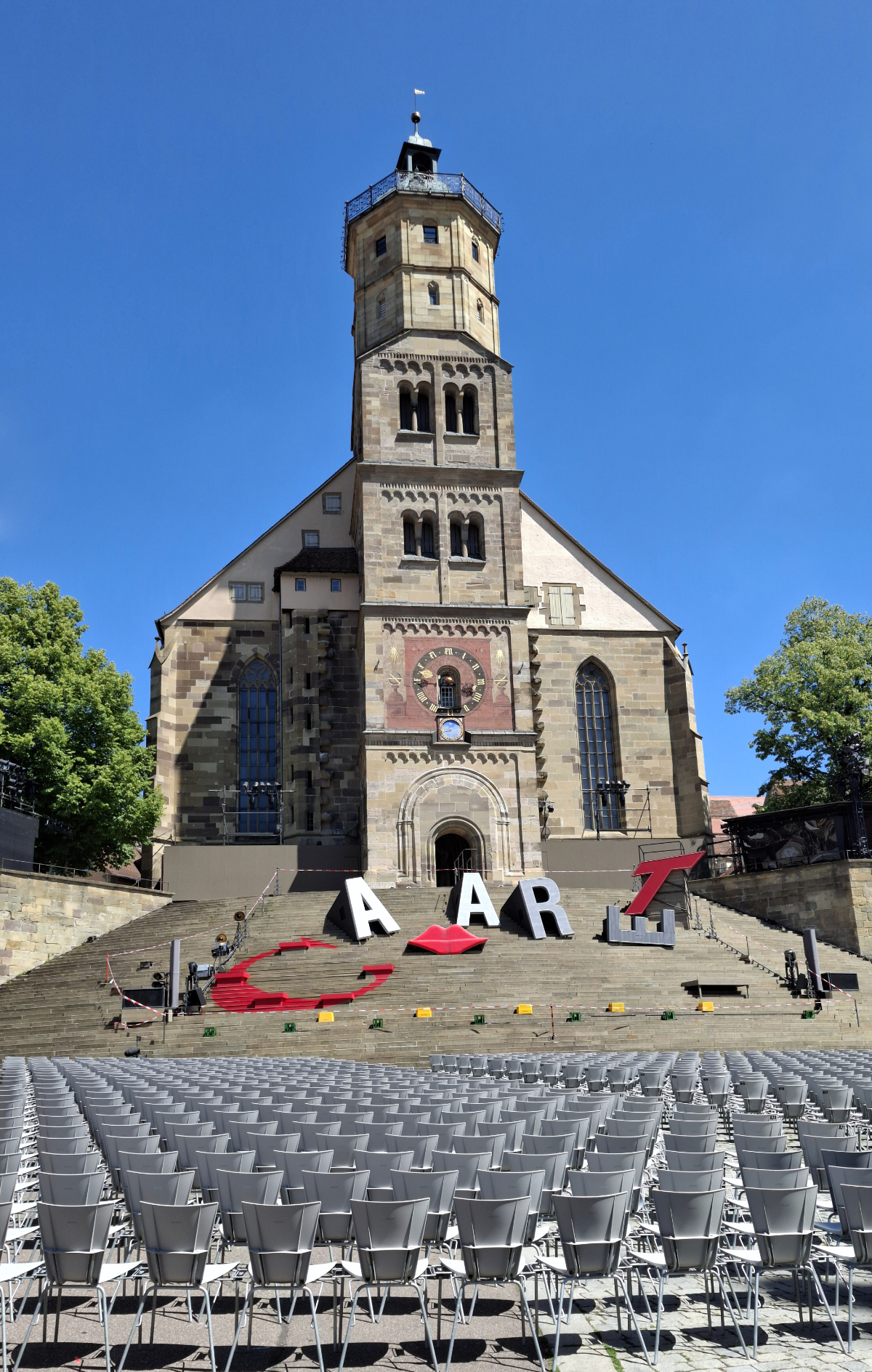
- The staircase of St Michael's Church, the festival's principal open-air stage
- Genre: Theatre
- Frequency: Annual
- Venue: Great Staircase of St Michael's Church; Neues Globe
- Locations: Schwäbisch Hall, Germany
- Inaugurated: 1925
- Founder: Robert Braun
- Attendance: c. 78,000 (2025)
- Artistic director: Christian Doll
- Organiser: Freilichtspiele Schwäbisch Hall e. V.
- Website: www.freilichtspiele-hall.de

Freilichtspiele Schwäbisch Hall is a theatre festival in Schwäbisch Hall, Baden-Württemberg, Germany. Founded in 1925, it is one of Germany's established open-air theatre festivals. Its principal stage is the staircase of the Church of St Michael, where productions are performed in the open air each summer. Since 2019, productions have also been staged in the Neues Globe, a permanent theatre with a retractable roof that enables performances throughout the year. The festival is a member of the Zehn deutsche Festspielorte ("Ten German Festival Towns"), an association of German theatre and music festivals.

== History ==
The festival was founded in 1925 by Robert Braun, director of the Kurtheater Schwäbisch Hall, with Hugo von Hofmannsthal's Jedermann as its inaugural production. Else Rassow succeeded Braun as artistic director in 1926 and continued the Jedermann tradition until 1938. After the Second World War, the festival resumed in 1948 under Wilhelm Speidel, who expanded its repertoire beyond Jedermann to include other religious and classical works.

Under artistic director Achim Plato, who led the festival from 1969 to 2003, the repertoire was broadened to include works addressing contemporary and socially contentious subjects. Children's and family theatre was introduced in 1985, and the first musical performed on the Great Staircase, Jesus Christ Superstar, followed in 1990.

Christoph Biermeier served as artistic director from 2003 to 2016, during which the festival expanded its educational and youth programmes, collaborations and winter activities. Since 2017, the artistic director has been Christian Doll. The festival celebrated its centenary in 2025 with a programme including Jedermann and West Side Story.

== Venues ==
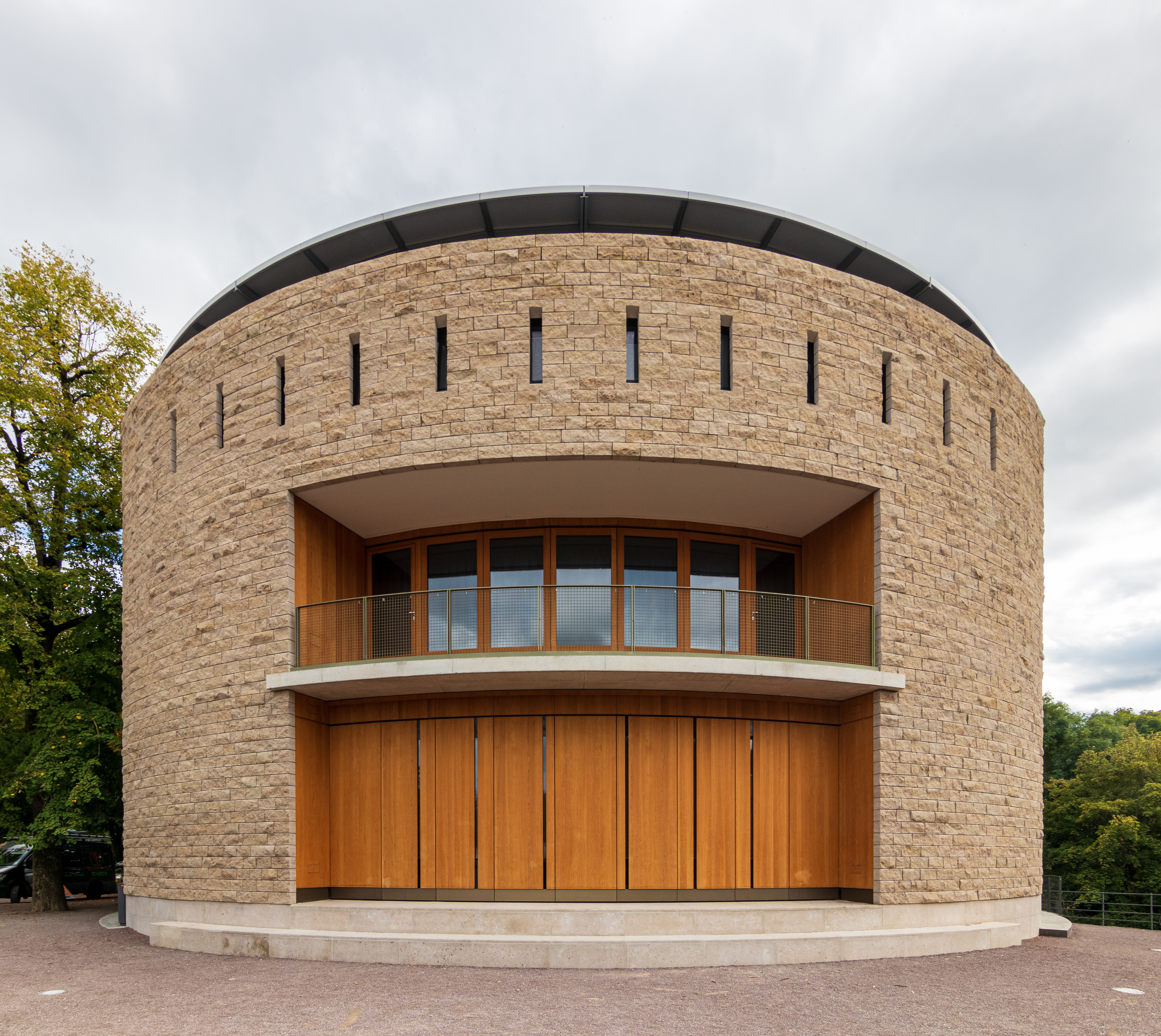
The Neues Globe, opened in 2019 as the festival's year-round venue

The festival's principal stage is the Große Treppe ("Great Staircase"), a flight of 54 steps leading from the market square to the Church of St Michael. Productions have been staged there in the open air since the festival was founded in 1925, with performers using the full height of the staircase and the church façade as a backdrop.

A second venue was introduced in 2000 with the opening of the Haller Globe, a circular timber theatre on the Kocher island of Unterwöhrd modelled on Shakespeare's Globe Theatre. Built as a temporary structure to mark the festival's 75th anniversary, it seated about 570 spectators and remained in use until the end of the 2016 season.

The Neues Globe, a permanent replacement for the Haller Globe on the same site, opened on 29 March 2019. The 371-seat theatre has a retractable glass roof, allowing performances to be staged either in the open air or under cover and enabling the festival to present productions throughout the year.

== Artistic directors ==
- 1925–1926: Robert Braun
- 1926–1938: Else Rassow
- 1948–1969: Wilhelm Speidel
- 1969–2003: Achim Plato
- 2003–2016: Christoph Biermeier
- Since 2017: Christian Doll
