= Wibke Bruhns =

German journalist and author (1938–2019)

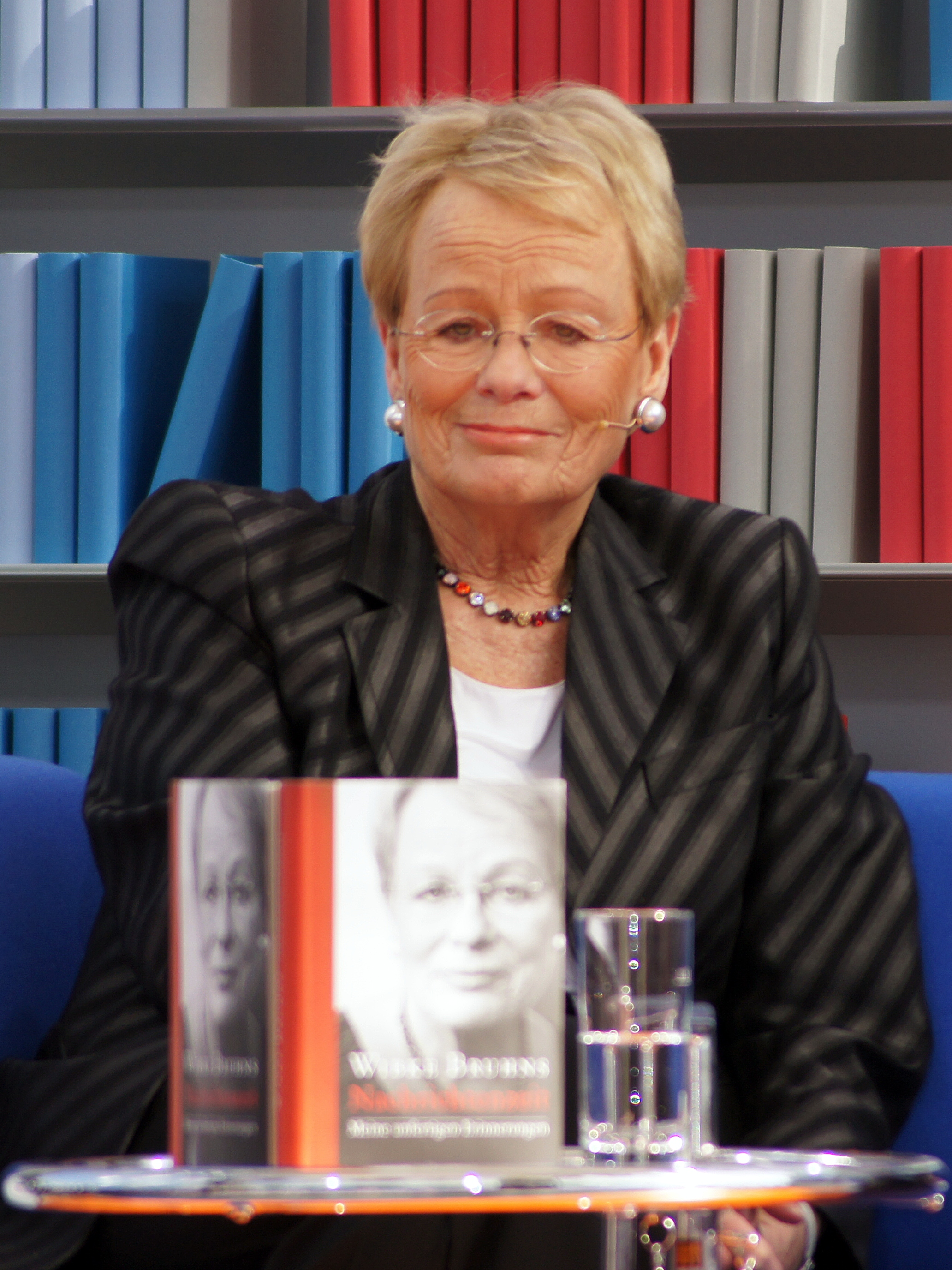
- Wibke Bruhns in 2012
- Born: Wibke Gertrud Klamroth; 8 September 1938; Halberstadt, Germany
- Died: 20 June 2019 (aged 80); Berlin, Germany
- Occupations: Journalist; Television presenter; Author
- Organizations: ZDF; Stern
- Children: Annika Bruhns
- Parent: Hans Georg Klamroth
- Website: Egon Erwin Kisch Prize; Friedrich-Schiedel-Literaturpreis

Wibke Gertrud Bruhns (born Klamroth; 8 September 1938 – 20 June 2019) was a German journalist and author. In 1971, she was the first woman to present the news on German public television. She was a journalist for several television stations, and for the Stern magazine in Jerusalem and Washington, D.C. She was also a speaker at Expo 2000.

She wrote about her memories in three books: about her time as a correspondent in Israel, the biography of her father, Hans Georg Klamroth, who was executed by the Nazis, and her autobiography, covering political events of decades.

== Career ==
=== Education ===
Wibke Gertrud Klamroth was born in Halberstadt, one of five children of the merchant Hans Georg Klamroth and his wife Else, née Podeus. Her father knew of the 20 July plot to assassinate Adolf Hitler and was executed on 26 August 1944. Her mother had to raise the children alone.

Bruhns attended several boarding schools, including the Bugenhagen-Internat in Timmendorfer Strand, and a boarding school in Plön. She achieved her Abitur in Berlin. She then lived for half a year in London, where her mother worked in the German Embassy. She then attended a Handelsschule for one year. She started to study history and politology in Hamburg but did not complete the course.

=== Media ===
Bruhns began work in the media at age 22, for different television stations, newspapers and magazines. She became known as the first female news presenter in West German television, as moderator of the ZDF news program heute from 12 May 1971. She was a journalist for the Stern magazine in Jerusalem and Washington, D.C.

Bruhns lived as a freelance journalist in Berlin. She died on 20 June 2019.

== Publications ==
=== Journalism ===
- Trendwende im Nahost in: Stern, 12 February 1981, No. 8, p. 238.
- Die letzten Tage von Beirut in: Stern, 5 August 1982, No. 36, p. 106.
- Exodus in eine fremde Heimat. Rußland-Emigranten in Israel (with photos by Thomas Hegenbart) in: GEO, Hamburg, April 1992, pp. 88–104.
- Als sich das ZDF etwas traute in: Die Zeit, 28 May 2009

=== Literature ===
In her first book, Mein Jerusalem, published in 1982, Bruhns focused on her experiences as a correspondent for Stern in Israel. Her second book, Meines Vaters Land (My Father's Country), is her father's biography, based on letters between him and his father as well as family pictures to illustrate. Published in 2004, the book spawned much discussion. It was translated to English in 2007 and published in 2008. Her third book, Nachrichtenzeit (News time) is an autobiography, covering both private and professional life, touching political developments of decades.

- Bruhns, Wibke; Schliack, Amos (1982). Mein Jerusalem (in German). Hamburg: Gruner + Jahr. ISBN 3-570-04952-3. OCLC 24373680.
- Bruhns, Wibke (2005). Meines Vaters Land : Geschichte einer deutschen Familie (in German). Berlin: Ullstein. ISBN 3-430-11571-X. OCLC 61517270.
- Bruhns, Wibke (2012). Nachrichtenzeit meine unfertigen Erinnerungen (in German). München. ISBN 978-3-426-27562-7. OCLC 782910476.

=== Other ===
- Ich bekomme ein Kind (with Ursula Klamroth), Falken-Verlag Erich Sicker, Wiesbaden 1969.
- In aller Munde: Fremdwörter. 1000 Begriffe, die uns täglich begegnen Schwann, Düsseldorf 1972.
- Anderson, Roger; Bruhns, Wibke; Eckardt, Emanuel (1996). Medien Macher : Journalisten beschreiben die Herrscher der vierten Gewalt (in German). Hamburg: Rasch und Röhring. ISBN 3-89136-568-3. OCLC 36290075.

== Film ==
- Meines Vaters Land – Eine deutsche Familiengeschichte, documentary, 45 minutes, book and direction: Gabriele Conradt and Gabriele Dennecke, production: RBB, first airing: 3 January 2007

== Awards ==
- 1989: Egon Erwin Kisch Prize for her GEO-Reportage
- 2006: Friedrich-Schiedel-Literaturpreis for Meines Vaters Land
- 2007: Hedwig-Dohm-Urkunde of the Journalistinnenbund (association of women journalists)
