= Kala (Tarzan) =

- First appearance: Tarzan of the Apes
- Last appearance: Jungle Tales of Tarzan
- Created by: Edgar Rice Burroughs

In-universe information
- Species: Mangani; Gorilla (Disney version)
- Spouses: Tublat (book); Kerchak (Disney films)
- Children: Akut (2016 film); Tarzan (adoptive son)
- Relatives: Terk (niece, Disney films)

Kala is a fictional ape character in Edgar Rice Burroughs's original Tarzan novel, Tarzan of the Apes, and in movies and other media based on it. She is the foster mother of Tarzan and raised him following the death of his parents.

== Fictional character biography ==
In the novel, Kala is a female in a band of Mangani, a fictional species of great ape intermediate between gorillas and chimpanzees. The band of mangani encounter the Claytons, and while Kerchak attacks the father, Kala discovers their baby son. Grieving the death of her own baby, she takes the young Tarzan and raises him as her own. After Tarzan reaches adulthood, Kala is killed by Kulonnga, a central African hunter who Tarzan subsequently kills in revenge.

Kala is frequently mentioned in Tarzan books set after her death. She also appears in Jungle Tales of Tarzan, a collection of short stories set during Tarzan's youth.

== In other media ==
=== Film ===
- Kala appears in Tarzan of the Apes (1918).
- Kala appears in Greystoke: The Legend of Tarzan, Lord of the Apes (1984).
- Kala appears in the Walt Disney Animation Studios film Tarzan (1999), voiced by Glenn Close. This version is a gorilla and Kerchak's mate who adopted Tarzan after his parents and Kala's child were killed by the leopard Sabor.
- The Disney incarnation of Kala appears in Tarzan II (2005), voiced again by Glenn Close.
- Kala appears in Tarzan (2013). Similar to the Disney incarnation, this version is a gorilla and Kerchak's mate.
- Kala appears in The Legend of Tarzan (2016).

=== Television ===
The Disney incarnation of Kala appears in The Legend of Tarzan (2001), voiced by Susanne Blakeslee.

=== Video games ===
- The Disney incarnation of Kala appears in the video game adaptation of Tarzan (1999), voiced by Susanne Blakeslee.
- The Disney incarnation of Kala appears in Kingdom Hearts (2002).
- The Disney incarnation of Kala appears in Disney's Extreme Skate Adventure (2003).

== See also ==
- Tarzan
- Tarzan & Jane
- Tarzan II
- The Legend of Tarzan
