= Tarzan (franchise) =

Disney media franchise

Disney's Tarzan
- Created by: Walt Disney Pictures; Walt Disney Feature Animation; Edgar Rice Burroughs (original characters)
- Original work: Tarzan (1999)
- Owner: The Walt Disney Company
- Years: 1999-2021
- Based on: Tarzan by Edgar Rice Burroughs

Films and television
- Film: Tarzan (1999)
- Animated series: The Legend of Tarzan (2001–2003)
- Direct-to-video: Tarzan & Jane (2002); Tarzan II (2005)

Theatrical presentations
- Musicals: Tarzan Rocks! (1999); Tarzan: The Musical (2006)

Games
- Video games: Disney's Tarzan (1999); Disney's Tarzan Activity Center (1999); Tarzan: Untamed (2001); Disney's Tarzan: Return to the Jungle (2002); Kingdom Hearts (2002)^{*}; Disney's Extreme Skate Adventure (2003)^{*}

Audio
- Soundtrack: Tarzan: An Original Walt Disney Records Soundtrack (1999)

Miscellaneous
- Theme park attractions: Tarzan's Treehouse (1999–2021); Tarzan Rocks! (1999–2006)
- ^{*} Work where this franchise's characters or settings appeared as part of a crossover.

Tarzan is a Disney media franchise that commenced in 1999 with the theatrical release of the film Tarzan, based on the character Tarzan by Edgar Rice Burroughs.

== Films ==
| Film | U.S release date | Director(s) | Screenwriter(s) | Story by | Producer(s) |
|---|---|---|---|---|---|
| Tarzan | June 18, 1999 | Kevin Lima and Chris Buck | Tab Murphy, Bob Tzudiker, and Noni White | Stephen Anderson, Mark D. Kennedy, Carole Holliday, Gaëtan Brizzi, Paul Brizzi, Don Dougherty, Ed Gombert, Randy Haycock, Don Hall, Kevin L. Harkey, Glen Keane, Burny Mattinson, Frank Nissen, John Norton, Jeff Snow, Michael Surrey, Christopher J. Ure, Mark Walton, Stevie Wermers, Kelly Wightman, and John Ramirez | Bonnie Arnold |
| Tarzan & Jane | July 23, 2002 | Victor Cook and Steve Loter | Mirith J. Colao, John Behnke, Rob Humphrey, Jim Peterson, and Jess Winfield | | Steve Loter |
| Tarzan II | June 14, 2005 | Brian Smith | Jim Kammerud, Brian Smith, Bob Tzudiker, and Noni White | Jim Kammerud, Brian Smith, Bob Tzudiker, and Noni White | Carolyn Bates, Jim Kammerud, and Leslie Hough |

=== Tarzan (1999) ===
Tarzan is a 1999 American animated adventure musical film produced by Walt Disney Feature Animation and released by Walt Disney Pictures. It is based on the story Tarzan of the Apes by Edgar Rice Burroughs, and is the only major motion picture version of the story Tarzan property to be animated.

=== Tarzan & Jane (2002) ===
Tarzan & Jane is a Disney direct-to-video film released on July 23, 2002, sequel to the 1999 animated feature Tarzan, and uses three unaired episodes of the film's corresponding television series, The Legend of Tarzan. The film is set one year after the events of the first film.

=== Tarzan II (2005) ===
Tarzan II (also known as Tarzan II: The Legend Begins) is a 2005 direct-to-video animated film and follow-up to the 1999 Walt Disney Feature Animation film Tarzan. It was released on June 14, 2005. Taking place during Tarzan's youth and before his adulthood, the film follows Tarzan's adventure to discover who he really is.

== Television ==
=== The Legend of Tarzan ===
The Legend of Tarzan is an American animated television series created by The Walt Disney Company in 2001, based on the Tarzan character created by Edgar Rice Burroughs. The series aired on ABC from July 13 to September 7, 2002, as part of its "Disney's One Saturday Morning" lineup. The Legend of Tarzan picks up where the 1999 feature film left off.

== Broadway musical ==
=== Tarzan ===
The original Broadway musical production of Tarzan opened in 2006, directed and designed by Bob Crowley with choreography by Meryl Tankard. The production ran for 35 previews and 486 performances. Subsequently, the show has been staged in several foreign countries and by regional theatres.

== Video games ==
=== Disney's Tarzan ===
Disney's Tarzan (also known as Tarzan Action Game) is a platform game developed by Eurocom and published by Sony Computer Entertainment for the PlayStation console in 1999. Konami published the game for its Japanese release. It was also released on the PC and Game Boy Color in 1999, and Nintendo 64 in 2000.

=== Tarzan: Untamed ===
Tarzan: Untamed (known as Tarzan: FreeRide in Europe) is a 2001 action-adventure video game released by Ubisoft Montreal for the PlayStation 2 and was a launch title for the GameCube. Taking place after the events of the film, the game follows Tarzan as his new life with Jane is threatened by unscrupulous scientist Oswald Gardner.

=== Tarzan Jungle Tumble ===
Tarzan Jungle Tumble is a 2001 platform game developed and released by Disney Interactive for the PC.

=== Tarzan: Return to the Jungle ===
Tarzan: Return to the Jungle is a 2002 platform game released by Activision for Game Boy Advance. In this game, Tarzan and Terk are lost, and they must return home to protect the jungle from Queen La.

=== Disney's Tarzan Activity Center ===
Disney's Tarzan Activity Center, a 1999 game which is part of Disney's Activity Center series.

=== Other appearances ===
- Tarzan's home, "Deep Jungle", is a playable world in the Disney/Square Enix video game Kingdom Hearts released for PlayStation 2 in 2002. Tony Goldwyn and Brian Blessed were the only cast members to reprise their roles in the game. It does not appear in any subsequent games in the series, save for the game's Final Mix version, due to Square Enix's failure to acquire the required rights from Edgar Rice Burroughs, Inc.
- Tarzan, Jane, Tantor, and Terk, in their young forms, appear as playable characters in Disney's Extreme Skate Adventure, developed by Toys for Bob and released for PlayStation 2, GameCube, Xbox, and Game Boy Advance in 2003.

== Theme park attractions ==
=== Tarzan's Treehouse ===
Tarzan's Treehouse is a walk through attraction at Disneyland and Hong Kong Disneyland. It is styled after the 1999 film Tarzan.

=== Tarzan Rocks! ===
Tarzan Rocks! was a musical show that took place in the Theater in the Wild at Disney's Animal Kingdom from 1999 to 2006. It featured rollerskating monkeys along with Tarzan, Jane and Terk. It also featured songs from the Tarzan film by Phil Collins. It was replaced by Finding Nemo – The Musical.

=== Meet and greets ===
Tarzan, Jane, and Terk all appear at the Disney Parks and Resorts as meetable characters, and can be found in Adventureland, and at Disney's Animal Kingdom.

== Music ==
=== Tarzan soundtrack ===
Tarzan: An Original Walt Disney Records Soundtrack is the soundtrack for the 1999 Disney animated film, Tarzan. The songs on the soundtrack were composed by Phil Collins, and the instrumental score by Mark Mancina. The song "You'll Be in My Heart" won both an Oscar and a Golden Globe for Best Original Song and received a Grammy Award nomination for Best Song Written for a Motion Picture, Television or Other Visual Media while the soundtrack album received a Grammy Award for Best Soundtrack Album. For his contribution to the soundtrack, Collins received an American Music Award for Favorite Adult Contemporary Artist.

- "You'll Be in My Heart"
- "Strangers Like Me"
- "Son of Man"
- "Two Worlds"
- "Trashin The Camp"

== Cast and characters ==
List indicators

This section includes characters who will appear or have appeared in more than two films in the series.

- An empty grey cell indicates the character was not in the film, or that the character's official presence has not yet been confirmed.
- ^{Y} indicates a younger version of the character.

| Characters | Main films | | | Television series | Video game |
| Characters | Tarzan | Tarzan & Jane | Tarzan II | The Legend of Tarzan | Tarzan: Untamed |
| Characters | 1999 | 2002 | 2005 | 2001–2003 | 2001 |
|---|---|---|---|---|---|
| Tarzan | Tony Goldwyn Brian Blessed (Tarzan yell) | Michael T. Weiss | Harrison Chad | Michael T. Weiss | Tony Goldwyn |
| Tarzan | Alex D. Linz^{Y} | Michael T. Weiss | Harrison Chad | Shaun Fleming^{Y} | Tony Goldwyn |
| Jane Porter | Minnie Driver | Olivia d'Abo | | Olivia d'Abo | Naia Kelly |
| Terk | Rosie O'Donnell | April Winchell | Brenda Grate | April Winchell | Audrey Wasilewski |
| Tantor | Wayne Knight | Jim Cummings | Harrison Fahn | Jim Cummings | Bob Amaral |
| Tantor | Taylor Dempsey^{Y} | Jim Cummings | Harrison Fahn | Taylor Dempsey^{Y} | Bob Amaral |
| Kala | Glenn Close | Susanne Blakeslee | Glenn Close | Susanne Blakeslee | Susanne Blakeslee |
| Kerchak | Lance Henriksen | | Lance Henriksen | Lance Henriksen | |
| Professor Archimedes Q. Porter | Nigel Hawthorne | Jeff Bennett | | Jeff Bennett | Nigel Hawthorne |
| Clayton | Brian Blessed | | | Character is mute | |
| Sabor / Leopard Cub | Frank Welker | | Frank Welker | Frank Welker | |
| Flynt | Erik von Detten | Erik von Detten | | Erik von Detten | |
| Mungo | Jason Marsden | Jason Marsden | | Jason Marsden | |
| Nura and Sheeta | | Frank Welker | | Frank Welker | |
| Johannes Niels | | John O'Hurley | | John O'Hurley | |
| Marcus | | Jim Cummings | | Jim Cummings | |
| Robert Canler | | Jeff Bennett | | Jeff Bennett | |
| Nigel Taylor | | Alexis Denisof | | Alexis Denisof | |
| Renard Dumont | | Rene Auberjonois | | Rene Auberjonois | |
| Hugo and Hooft | | Character is mute | | Dave Thomas; Joe Flaherty | |
| Zugor | | | George Carlin | | |
| Mama Gunda | | | Estelle Harris | | |
| Uto | | | Brad Garrett | | |
| Kago | | | Ron Perlman | | |
| Henry | | | | Alexis Denisof | |
| Dania | | | | Kathy Najimy | |
| Samuel T. Philander | | | | Craig Ferguson | |
| Queen La | | | | Diahann Carroll | |
| Moyo | | | | Neil Patrick Harris | |
| Tublat | | | | Keith David | |
| Hobson | | | | Jim Cummings | |
| Greenley | | Grey DeLisle | | Grey DeLisle | |
| Eleanore | | Nicollette Sheridan | | Nicollette Sheridan | |
| Hazel | | Tara Strong | | Tara Strong | |
| Zutho | | | | Jason Alexander | |
| Colonel Staguait | | | | Jim Cummings | |
| Oswald Gardner | | | | | Brian George |
| Mr. Wolf | | | | | Greg Ellis |
