= Tarzan: Return to the Jungle =

2002 video game

- Developer: Digital Eclipse
- Publisher: Activision
- Director: Mike Mika
- Producer: William Baffy
- Programmer: Cathryn Mataga
- Artists: Daniel Schallock; Boyd Burggrabe
- Composer: Robert Baffy
- Series: Tarzan
- Platform: Game Boy Advance
- Release: NA: October 23, 2002; EU: November 22, 2002
- Genre: Platform
- Mode: Single-player

Tarzan: Return to the Jungle is a 2002 platform game developed by Digital Eclipse and published by Activision for the Game Boy Advance. The game is based on the 2001–2003 animated television series The Legend of Tarzan.

== Gameplay ==
The game is an action-platformer that bears similarities to the previous Tarzan game for the Game Boy Color. Tarzan begins the game as a child, with his adult self appearing in later stages. With the additions of L and R buttons on the Game Boy Advance, combating enemies is now possible.

In contrast to the previous game, collecting bananas is no longer a requirement to complete a stage; they now act as currency, as typical of platforming titles, and should the player collect 50-100 bananas, they will receive an extra life.

== Plot ==
The villainous Queen La, a character from the television series, attempts to take over the jungle. Tarzan learns traversal and combat abilities from Terk as his younger self, journeys through the Lost City of Opar, and rescues dinosaur eggs from poachers to save the jungle.

== Development ==
Tarzan: Return to the Jungle was developed by Digital Eclipse, which began development following the critical and commercial success of its Game Boy Color predecessor, Tarzan. Much of the staff that worked on the first game returned for this one. Producer William Baffy cited the Game Boy Advance's superior selection of colors and planes, as well as improved sprite count and quality, as the big advantages of the hardware for development.

== Reception ==
The game has received generally positive reviews. GameSpy stated, "It [the game] never gets quite as fun or inventive as any of the Mario or Rayman platform games, but Tarzan: Return to the Jungle holds its own surprisingly well, and is a must-have for fans of its GBC predecessor". Nintendo World Report stated, "This game is the perfect thing for kids who are Tarzan fans. It looks very good, plays and sounds pretty, and will keep someone occupied long enough for it to merit a rental, if you don't want to spend $30 on a game that you won't be playing much after you finish if off the first time".

Disney's Tarzan: Return to the Jungle

Aggregate scores
Aggregator	Score
GameRankings	71.44%
Metacritic	68 out of 100

Review scores
Publication	Score
GameSpy	4/5
GameZone	7 out of 10
IGN	7 out of 10
Nintendo Power	3.4 out of 5
Nintendo World Report	7 out of 10
X-Play	3/5
