= Kerchak =

- Created by: Edgar Rice Burroughs

In-universe information
- Species: Mangani (novels); Gorilla (Disney films)
- Gender: Male
- Spouse: Kala (Disney films)
- Children: Unnamed son (Disney films, deceased); Tarzan (adoptive son, Disney films)
- Relatives: Terk (niece, Disney films)

Kerchak is a fictional ape character in Edgar Rice Burroughs's original Tarzan novel, Tarzan of the Apes, and in movies and other media based on it.

== History ==
In the novel Tarzan of the Apes, Kerchak is the "king" of a tribal band of Mangani, a fictional species of great ape intermediate between gorillas and chimpanzees. Per the common practice among Mangani tribes, the band self-identifies by the name of its leader, and is therefore known as "the tribe of Kerchak". Kerchak reigns by violence and fear heightened by his unpredictable mood swings and bouts of madness.

In the beginning of the original novel, Kerchak leads his band against Tarzan's marooned father and kills him; the infant Tarzan is saved by a female Mangani named Kala, who rears the baby and protects him from Kerchak. However, after Tarzan reaches adulthood, the ape man's deeds and cleverness raise him to a prominence in the band Kerchak finds impossible to ignore, and the king attacks his human subject. The fight proves Kerchak's undoing, as Tarzan kills the tyrant, succeeding him for a time as king of the apes. Kerchak's terrible reign has made a lasting impression on his subjects, however, as even after his death his former tribe is often referred to as "the tribe of Kerchak", whatever other individual happens to be king.

Burroughs's later Tarzan book Jungle Tales of Tarzan, which relates additional details of Tarzan's youth among the apes, is also set during the period of Kerchak's rule of the ape band. Kerchak does not appear in the book, possibly indicating either frequent absences from the tribe or the author's unwillingness to complicate his story by use of a character whose significant interactions with Tarzan were already detailed.

== In other media ==
=== Film ===
- Kerchak, with elements of Tublat, appears in the Walt Disney Animation Studios film Tarzan (1999), voiced by Lance Henriksen. This version is a silverback gorilla and mate to Tarzan's adoptive mother, Kala. After Sabor the leopard kills his child, Kerchak becomes bitter and cynical. Kerchak doubts Tarzan during his childhood, but begins to accept him after Tarzan kills Sabor and saves the group from the hunter Clayton. Kerchak is shot by Clayton while protecting Tarzan and passes his leadership of his gorilla troop to Tarzan before dying.
- The Disney incarnation of Kerchak appears in Tarzan II, voiced again by Lance Henriksen.
- Kerchak appears in Tarzan (2013). Similar to the Disney incarnation, this version is a silverback gorilla, Kala's mate, and father of their birth child. Challenged by the rogue Tublat, he successfully defends his dominance, only to be killed by Tublat immediately after.

=== Television ===
The Disney incarnation of Tarzan appears in The Legend of Tarzan episode "Tarzan and Tublat's Revenge", voiced again by Lance Henriksen.

=== Video games ===
- The Disney incarnation of Kerchak appears in the video game adaptation of Tarzan, voiced by Gregg Berger.
- The Disney incarnation of Kerchak appears in Kingdom Hearts.
- The Disney incarnation of Kerchak appears in Disney's Extreme Skate Adventure, voiced again by Gregg Berger.
