= Tarzan: Untamed =

2001 video game

- North American PlayStation 2 cover art
- Developer: Ubi Soft Montreal
- Publisher: Ubi Soft
- Series: Tarzan
- Platforms: PlayStation 2; GameCube
- Release: PlayStation 2: NA: November 14, 2001; EU: November 23, 2001; JP: July 4, 2002; GameCube: NA: November 18, 2001; EU: May 3, 2002
- Genre: Action-adventure
- Mode: Single-player

Tarzan: Untamed (known as Tarzan: Freeride in Europe and Japan) is a 2001 action-adventure game developed by Ubi Soft Montreal and published by Ubi Soft for the PlayStation 2 and GameCube.

== Plot ==
Picking up quite a while after the defeat of Clayton, Jane and Professor Archimedes Q. Porter now understand Gorilla-language fluently and Jane is married to Tarzan. However, their lives are threatened once again by a brutal band of British explorers led by the unscrupulous Oswald Gardner, who becomes fascinated with Tarzan and strives to capture the ape-man and take him back to England as a media attraction.

== Gameplay ==
Oswald's henchmen have captured several baby gorillas to sell to zoos. Tarzan must break the cages and return them to the gorilla family. His enemies include poachers and jungle animals, such as leopards, snakes, rhinoceroses, porcupines, wild boars, bats, spiders, piranhas and crocodiles. He also collects film reels that belong to Oswald and spears to use as weapons. In later stages of the game, he receives help from the gorilla family, hippopotamuses and baboons.

== Reception ==
Tarzan: Untamed

Aggregate scores
Aggregator	Score	
Aggregator	GameCube	PS2
GameRankings	63.83%	61.04%
Metacritic	61/100	59/100

Review scores
Publication	Score	
Publication	GameCube	PS2
AllGame	2/5	2/5
Computer and Video Games	N/A	4/10
Game Informer	N/A	7.75/10
GamePro	N/A	2/5
GameSpot	6.2/10	5.9/10
GameSpy	70%	N/A
IGN	6.3/10	6.2/10
NGC Magazine	59%	N/A
Nintendo Power	3.8/5	N/A
Official U.S. PlayStation Magazine	N/A	3.5/5

Tarzan: Untamed received mixed reviews upon its release, according to review aggregator Metacritic. GameSpot gave the GameCube version a 6.2 out of 10 while they gave the PlayStation 2 version a 5.9 out of 10. IGN gave the GameCube version a 6.3 out of 10 and said, "Surf tree branches, swing from vines and chuck spears at jungle outsiders -- Tarzan has arrived.", while they gave the PlayStation 2 version a 6.2 out of 10, writing, "The ape man returns with glitz and glamor, but lacks a certain depth. It's a fun but short rental." Even with the mixed reviews, the Academy of Interactive Arts & Sciences nominated Tarzan for the "Console Family" award in 2002, which was ultimately given to Mario Party 3.
