= Tublat =

- First appearance: Tarzan of the Apes
- Last appearance: Jungle Tales of Tarzan
- Created by: Edgar Rice Burroughs
- Portrayed by: Keith David (voice)

In-universe information
- Species: Mangani in novels Gorilla (Disney version)
- Gender: Male
- Spouse: Kala (book, and 1984 film)
- Relatives: Tarzan (adopted son)

Tublat is a fictional ape character in Edgar Rice Burroughs's original Tarzan novel, Tarzan of the Apes and one of its sequels, Jungle Tales of Tarzan, as well as animated films, television series and other media based on them.

== History ==
In the novel Tarzan of the Apes, Tublat (whose name means "Broken Nose") is a member of a tribal band of Mangani, a fictional species of great ape intermediate between gorillas and chimpanzees. In the beginning of the original novel, Tublat's mate Kala saves the infant Tarzan from the murderous fury of Kerchak, the mad leader of the ape band, after the latter kills Tarzan's human father. Kala goes on to rear the human baby as her own while protecting him against both Kerchak and Tublat. Tublat, while portrayed as a fairly passive figure in the novel, is resentful of his foster-son Tarzan, and would kill him given the chance. Tarzan, in response, taunts and teases Tublat from a safe distance. Ultimately, when Tarzan has reached his early teens, Tublat goes mad and attacks Kala. To protect Kala Tarzan fights and kills Tublat.

Tublat also appears in Jungle Tales of Tarzan, the sixth book of the Tarzan series, which relates episodes from the ape man's youth omitted from Tarzan of the Apes. Chapter 7, "The End of Bukawai", relates episodes in which Tarzan taunts Tublat with his rope and is later almost killed when he swings so long on the rope that it frays and parts, dropping him to the ground. Tublat is glad to see Tarzan injured, though Kala runs to the boy's aid and he soon revives.

== Other versions ==
The character of Tublat has also appeared in the syndicated comic strip Tarzan and in Tarzan comic books, in a portrayal essentially faithful to Burroughs's conception, generally in adaptations of the original novel.

In the 1984 movie Greystoke: The Legend of Tarzan, Lord of the Apes, Tublat is reimagined as Silverbeard, with a similarly conflicted relationship with his human foster child. He also killed Tarzan's human father after the death of his wife much like how Kerchak killed him in the original book, albeit with the change of a lack of motive for Clayton's gun, being portrayed as territorial upon noticing the man's presence once he has entered the cabin. Silverbeard is captured and taken to England as a live specimen where he is later re-encountered by Tarzan. They have a poignant reunion and Tarzan helps him escape. When Silverbeard is shot soon after, Tarzan is inconsolable.

In the 1999 Disney cartoon feature Tarzan, the Mangani are re-envisioned as gorillas, and Tublat's role as mate of Kala and foster father to Tarzan is assigned to Kerchak. The film's Kerchak is essentially a combination of the Kerchak and Tublat of the novel, though with a more benign personality than either. However, in the spin-off television series The Legend of Tarzan, Tublat himself appears as a separate and distinct character voiced by Keith David. He is one of the main antagonists in the series along with La and Samuel T. Philander. This version of Tublat is a violently aggressive, possibly even carnivorous, and a former member of Kerchak's gorilla tribe. Having been cast out of the band many years before after losing a leadership challenge to Kerchak where he tried to harm a younger Tarzan, he later seeks revenge against Tarzan. In the episode "Tarzan and the Enemy Within", Tublat takes over another gorilla family, that of Gobu, killing the group's original leader and exiling the latter into the jungle where he is almost killed by hyenas. Tarzan rescues Gobu whose family then retaliates against Tublat. In the episode, Tublat allied with Fungi the monkey (voiced by Max Casella).

In the 2013 animated film Tarzan, Tublat is a rogue gorilla who challenges Kerchak, silverback leader of a gorilla troop. Kerchak defeats him, but immediately afterwards Tublat treacherously brains the victor with a rock and takes over the troop. Kala later adopts the young Tarzan to take the place of her deceased child; the growing boy's relationship with Tublat is essentially the same as in Burroughs's original novel. Tarzan grows up to eventually challenge and banish Tublat, thus avenging Kerchak.
