= Tarzan II =

2005 animated Disney film directed by Brian Smith

- DVD cover
- Directed by: Brian Smith
- Screenplay by: Jim Kammerud; Brian Smith; Bob Tzudiker Noni White
- Based on: Tarzan of the Apes by; Edgar Rice Burroughs: Disney’s Tarzan by Walt Disney Animation Studios; Disney’s The Legend of Tarzan by Walt Disney Television
- Produced by: Carolyn Bates; Jim Kammerud; Leslie Hough
- Starring: Harrison Chad; George Carlin; Brad Garrett; Ron Perlman; Estelle Harris; Glenn Close; Lance Henriksen; Brenda Grate; Harrison Fahn
- Edited by: Ron Price; John Royer
- Music by: Mark Mancina (score); Dave Metzger (score); Phil Collins (songs)
- Production company: Disneytoon Studios (Note: Animation outsourced to Toon City Animation)
- Distributed by: Buena Vista Home Entertainment (Note: Distributed by Walt Disney Home Entertainment under the Walt Disney Pictures banner.)
- Release date: June 14, 2005
- Running time: 72 minutes
- Country: United States
- Language: English

Tarzan II (also known as Tarzan 2 and Tarzan 2: The Legend Begins) is a 2005 American animated direct-to-video adventure comedy film and the third Disney's Tarzan film after Tarzan and Jane, though it chronologically takes place during the events of the original film set during Tarzan's childhood, years before he met Jane. It was produced by Walt Disney Pictures and Disneytoon Studios with animation outsourced to Toon City Animation, and distributed by Buena Vista Home Entertainment.

Taking place during Tarzan's youth and before his adulthood, the film follows his adventure to discover who he really is. Glenn Close and Lance Henriksen reprise their roles as Kala and Kerchak from the first film while Harrison Chad, Brenda Grate, and Harrison Fahn are the new voices for the younger versions of Tarzan, Terk, and Tantor, replacing Alex D. Linz, Rosie O'Donnell, and Taylor Dempsey. They are joined by new characters voiced by George Carlin, Estelle Harris, Brad Garrett, and Ron Perlman.

Tarzan II was released on DVD and VHS on June 14, 2005.

== Plot ==
As a young boy raised by gorillas after the death of his parents in the African jungle, Tarzan worries that the mythical monster known as the Zugor will one day try to capture him. He is frustrated that he cannot run as fast as the other young gorillas in his family, and his attempts to prove his worth constantly cause chaos, much to Kerchak's dismay. When an accident after the gorillas cross a canyon leaves his mother, Kala, believing Tarzan to be dead, the other gorillas feel that Tarzan has met a fitting end. Tarzan listens to their feedback and believes that it would be best for everyone's good to distance himself from the family.

Alone in the jungle, Tarzan is pursued by Sabor the leopard, ending up in a rocky place known as the Dark Mountain. When the monster's echo calls, Sabor runs away while Tarzan is captured by two hulking, spoiled gorilla brothers, Uto and Kago, and their overprotective mother, Gunda. But when the monster's echo is heard again in the valley, the three of them, just as scared as Tarzan, run away, giving Tarzan the chance to escape. Along the way, he meets a capricious old gorilla, who initially tries to keep the boy at bay. Tarzan, however, discovers that this old gorilla is actually Zugor, who uses hollow trees as loudspeakers to amplify his voice while pretending to be a monster, so as to scare the other jungle creatures away from his territory and food. Tarzan uses this discovery to force Zugor to let him stay with him. Due to Tarzan's cheerfulness and helpfulness, Zugor begins to like him. Tarzan continues to try to find out who he is along with Zugor, while both promise not to tell anyone about their identities.

Tarzan's two best friends, Terk and Tantor, search for him, while Kala also learns that he is alive and searches for him. Terk and Tantor get into trouble in the Dark Mountain when they are confronted by Mama Gunda, Uto, and Kago, but manage to escape them. The two then find Tarzan and they all leave the Dark Mountain together, with Mama Gunda and her sons following them. Tarzan does not want to return home with them and reveals to them that there is no monster, which Mama Gunda and her sons overhear, discovering who Zugor really is and now they are looking for him. Uto and Kago destroy his treehouse in revenge, and Zugor accuses Tarzan of breaking his promise to him and leaves, refusing to help him again. Kala arrives near the Dark Mountain and is confronted by Mama Gunda and her sons, with Tarzan realizing what he is: a Tarzan with his own tricks that no one else can do in the jungle, while Zugor returns and befriends him again.

Tarzan is able to use tricks and traps to defeat Uto and Kago, while Terk and Tantor try to save Kala when she begins to fall off a cliff. Tarzan eventually saves her while Zugor holds Mama Gunda hostage. Due to their chemistry and a comment Zugor made that she has "beautiful eyes", they fall in love. Uto and Kago return and are shocked to see them together. Tarzan tells Kala that she was right and that he is part of the family too, and along with Terk and Tantor they return to the pack.

Kala gives Tarzan a hug and tells him how proud she is of him for saving her, while Mama Gunda punishes Uto and Kago for destroying Zugor's treehouse, ordering them to rebuild it and not fight or destroy things again. Tarzan, Terk, and Tantor play a game with a monster, where Tarzan is now happy and proud of himself for who he is.

== Voice cast ==
- Harrison Chad as Tarzan, a young human orphan raised by gorillas in the jungle. He is a socially awkward child struggling to fit in with his ape family. At the start of the film, Tarzan is afraid of the Zugor, a mythical monster said to live on Dark mountain. He also fears that his mother Kala would get hurt because of him.
- George Carlin as Zugor, an old hermit gorilla living in a hollow tree on Dark Mountain. He is the "monster" feared by Tarzan and almost all the animals, even Sabor before she was killed by the adult version of Tarzan in the first film.
- Brad Garrett as Uto, a cowardly, immature and slow-witted gorilla who likes to throw any creature he finds off a cliff to see if it can fly. He is Kago's younger brother.
- Ron Perlman as Kago, an aggressive, hot-headed gorilla, and an all around bully. A running gag is that he always gets the hiccups when his younger brother Uto pokes him. He is Uto's older brother.
- Estelle Harris as Mama Gunda, the intimidating, loud, physically short and short-tempered mother of Kago and Uto.
- Glenn Close as Kala, Tarzan's adoptive gorilla mother who loves her son more than anything. She is caring and patient unless provoked, or if her family is in danger.
- Lance Henriksen as Kerchak, Kala's mate and the leader of the gorilla family in the jungle who holds a dislike on Tarzan because of his human appearance.
- Brenda Grate as Terk, Tarzan's mischievous, quick-witted and sardonic "cousin". Her full name is Terkina, but she actually goes by Terk.
- Harrison Fahn as Tantor, a germophobic and neurotic elephant, whose best friends are Terk and Tarzan despite these impediments.

== Reception ==
The movie was nominated at the 33rd Annie Awards for Best Home Entertainment Production. The film received negative reviews from critics, and holds a score of 33% on Rotten Tomatoes based on six reviews.

== Music ==
Mark Mancina, the first movie's score composer, returned to compose the score for the film, joined by Dave Metzger. "Leaving Home" later became the song "I Need to Know" for the Broadway musical version of Tarzan. Phil Collins, who wrote and performed the songs for the first film, returned for this film.

No.	Title	Performer(s)	Length
1.	"Son of Man (Reprise)"	Phil Collins
2.	"Leaving Home (Find My Way)"	Phil Collins
3.	"Who Am I?"	Phil Collins
4.	"Who Am I? (Reprise)"	Phil Collins
5.	"Who Am I? (End Credit Version)"	Tiffany Evans
