= Tarzan & Jane =

2002 animated Disney film directed by Victor Cook and Steve Loter

- DVD cover
- Directed by: Victor Cook; Steve Loter
- Screenplay by: Mirith J. Colao; John Behnke; Rob Humphrey; Jim Peterson; Jess Winfield
- Based on: Tarzan of the Apes by Edgar Rice Burroughs The Legend of Tarzan by Walt Disney Television Animation
- Produced by: Steve Loter
- Starring: Michael T. Weiss; Olivia d'Abo; Jeff Bennett; Jim Cummings; Grey DeLisle; John O'Hurley; Tara Strong; April Winchell; Nicollette Sheridan
- Edited by: John Royer
- Music by: Patrick Griffin; Don Harper; Dave Metzger
- Production company: Walt Disney Television Animation
- Distributed by: Buena Vista Home Entertainment (Note: Distributed under the Walt Disney Home Entertainment imprint.)
- Release date: 2002
- Running time: 75 minutes
- Country: United States
- Language: English

Tarzan & Jane is a 2002 American animated adventure film produced by Walt Disney Television Animation. It is a direct-to-video spin-off and sequel of Disney's 1999 animated feature film Tarzan, and uses three then-unaired episodes of the film's corresponding television series, The Legend of Tarzan. Tarzan II, a prequel to both films, was released in 2005. The film is set one year after the events of the first film and Tarzan and Jane are married.

With the exceptions of Erik Von Detten and Jason Marsden as Flynt and Mungo respectively, none of the actors from the original film reprised their roles.

== Plot ==
One year after the events of the original film, this film makes use of a frame tale to present three self-contained "episodes" via flashback. Jane and Tarzan's first wedding anniversary has arrived, and Jane is trying to find a suitable present for her husband, with the help of the elephant Tantor and the gorilla Terk.

When a party is suggested, the trio remembers the disaster that occurred when three of Jane's friends arrived to rescue her, as they mistakenly believed Jane was being held captive in the jungle. After learning the truth, they decide to stay for a visit. Jane organizes an English-style picnic for her friends, but Tarzan refuses to join them after believing Jane is embarrassed by his savage habits. The picnic is interrupted when two panthers, Nuru and Sheeta, attack Jane and her friends, forcing them to flee into the deeper regions of the jungle. As Jane teaches her friends a few survival techniques, they are once again ambushed by the panthers, only to be saved when Tarzan rushes in. When Jane and her friends leave the next day, they thank her for the adventure and say they hope to come back soon.

Back to the present day, Jane ponders over the idea of expensive gifts, particularly jewelry, prompting Terk to remind her of the time Tarzan tried to get her a diamond. Tarzan had led two men, Johannes Niels and Merkus, to a nearby volcano containing a diamond mine, and in return, they would give him one of the diamonds to give to Jane, only for them to turn on him once inside, wanting to take all the diamonds for themselves. The volcano then erupted with Tarzan, Jane, and Professor Porter trapped inside, though they managed to escape before the lava flows reached them. Tarzan then rescued Johannes and Merkus, only for them to lose their diamonds in the process. They are arrested after this and taken back to England.

Professor Porter then joins the conversation, suggesting to Jane that she and Tarzan should celebrate their anniversary with a dance. This causes Terk to bring up the time Jane's old friend Robert Canler visited. Things had gone well, despite Tarzan feeling jealous and mistrusting towards Canler (claiming that he is a bad man who reminds him of Sabor, which Jane dismisses) until Canler revealed he was working as a double agent for the Germans of the German Empire during World War I and had come for a code machine disguised as a music box he gave to Jane for safekeeping. He then kidnaps her, but was tracked down and stopped by Tarzan assisted by RAF pilot Nigel Taylor, who had been on Canler's trail. Taylor commandeers Canler's plane and takes him back to England to stand trial. Jane is saddened that Tarzan was right about Canler all along, but Tarzan senses that he may have some good within him as he did return to save Jane at one point.

Having run out of ideas and realizing anniversaries would not fit in with Tarzan's uncivilized lifestyle, Jane returns to the treehouse in disappointment, only to cheer up after finding it decorated and everyone, including Tarzan, who is wearing his father's suit, planned a surprise party to make her happy. Terk, Tantor, and the Professor had known about it all along and were simply distracting her while everyone else got the party set up. Tarzan gives Jane a diamond ring made from the same diamonds in the volcano. The celebrations start as everyone dances, including Tarzan and Jane, and the film concludes with the couple dancing under the moonlight with fireflies all around.

== Cast ==
- Michael T. Weiss as Tarzan
- Olivia d'Abo as Jane Porter
- April Winchell as Terk
- Jim Cummings as Tantor and Merkus
- John O'Hurley as Johannes Niels
- Jeff Bennett as Prof. Archimedes Q. Porter and Robert Canler
- Alexis Denisof as Nigel Taylor
- Grey DeLisle as Greenly
- Nicollette Sheridan as Eleanor
- Tara Strong as Hazel
- René Auberjonois as Renard Dumont
- Frank Welker as Nuru and Sheeta

== Reception ==
Rotten Tomatoes, a review aggregator, reports that 20% of five surveyed critics gave the film a positive review; the average rating is 3/10. TV Guide rated it 3/5 stars and called it "sprightly amusement for kids of all ages".

== The Legend of Tarzan ==
This film is largely a flashback to three episodes of the TV series The Legend of Tarzan: "Tarzan and the British Invasion", "Tarzan and the Volcanic Diamond Mine" and "Tarzan and the Flying Ace", the last three episodes of the show to be aired (but taking place much earlier in production order).

An adventure game on the DVD is based on the series. It resembles a multiple-choice story, featuring many different characters from the series.
