= List of fictional big cats in animation =

This list of fictional big cats in animation is subsidiary to the list of fictional animals and is a collection of various notable feline characters that appear in various animated works of fiction. It is limited to well-referenced examples of large felines portrayed in animated television shows or feature-length films.

== Cheetahs ==
Name	Work	Notes
Azaad	The Lion Guard	Fuli's competitor and friend, later love interest
Officer Benjamin Clawhauser	Zootopia	An overweight police officer who loves donuts and is a huge fan of the popstar Gazelle.
Blur	Wild Kratts	A cheetah who loves chasing Chris when he is using Gazelle Powers.
Chiqicheetah	One Piece	A member of the Foxy Pirates who can transform into an humanoid cheetah. He was created for the One Piece anime.
Finbar	Hey Duggee	A cheetah that is part of the Hummingbirds, whose body resembles Norrie.
Fuli	The Lion Guard	An East African cheetah cub who is a member of the eponymous Lion Guard.
Jasper	Jewelpet	A cheetah who represents Honesty. He is yellow and brown-spotted with his inner ears, necklace and tail containing a red diamond-shaped jasper.
Sasha	Globehunters: An Around the World in 80 Days Adventure	Sasha is one of the main characters of the animated television film who is a female cheetah with green eyes.
Savannah Cheetaby	Littlest Pet Shop: A World of Our Own	Savannah Cheetaby is a white cheetah who is a very famous pop star in Paw-Tucket.
Spot Swat	Wild Kratts	A cheetah cub who is the son of Blur.
Tally	The Wild Thornberrys Movie	One of the cheetah cubs who got captured by two poachers while Eliza was playing with Akela's cubs.

== Leopards ==
Name	Work	Notes
Bagheera	The Jungle Book	Black leopard - a clever, serious and responsible character, quite similar to the Bagheera in the original book, except that in the novel Bagheera spoiled Mowgli more. In the film, it is Bagheera and not the wolves who first finds Mowgli, a young village child and he is the one who takes him back to the village.
Baransha	Zatch Bell!	A mystical black leopard-like creature who can become invisible.
Sabor	Tarzan	A vicious leopard, who killed Tarzan's parents, along with Kala and Kerchak's son. She was later killed by an adult Tarzan.
Makucha	The Lion Guard	A cream African leopard who tracks Ajabu an Okapi to the Pride Lands. He is also the leader of his clan of the back lands.
Badilli	The Lion Guard	An African leopard who is a victim to Mapigano. He eventually overcomes his fear by standing up for himself.
Mapigano	The Lion Guard	An African leopard who bullied Badilli upon his territory.
Tai Lung	Kung Fu Panda	A snow leopard who tries to snatch the dragon scroll from Shifu.
Chuluun	The Lion Guard	A snow leopard who frightens the red pandas. After being defeated by Bunga, she joins forces with Makucha to visit the Tree of Life.
Phango	Khumba	A leopard born blind in one eye who plans to kill Khumba.
Princess Romy	Around the World with Willy Fog	Indian princess and one of the main character of Willy Fog's series.
Trey	Rock Dog	A snow leopard
Sam Snow	The Creature Cases	A snow leopard who is the Agent of C.L.A.D.E, master of detective and friend of Kit Casey
Siri	Rugrats Go Wild	A clouded leopard. Voiced by Chrissie Hynde.
Yun Mibu	The Lion Guard	A clouded leopard who the Lion Guard encounter during their journey to the Tree of Life.
Sultan	Delhi Safari	Indian leopard. King of the Jungle. Begum's mate and Yuvraj's father.
Yuvraj	Delhi Safari	A leopard cub. Son of Sutan and Begum

== Lions ==
Name	Work	Notes
Aslan	Narnia	Aslan in the 2005 film The Chronicles of Narnia: The Lion, the Witch and the Wardrobe, voiced by Liam Neeson
Alex	Madagascar	The protagonist of DreamWorks Animation's Madagascar and its sequels. Voiced by Ben Stiller
Babban Sher	Chhota Bheem	A ferocious Asiatic lion enemy of Raju and a friend of Bheem.
Bester	Kateikyoushi Hitman Reborn!	
Bobby	My Gym Partner's a Monkey	
Brave Heart Lion	Care Bears	One of the Care Bear Cousins. He has brown-orange fur and his tummy symbol is a red heart wearing a crown on the right side.
Cat Burglar	Wild Kratts	A lion cub who was nicknamed by Jimmy Z because he stole his controller.
Chris	Wild Kratts	A lion cub who was named by Aviva after a green bucket of paint fell on him.
Clay Calloway	Sing 2	A reclusive lion who retired from his rock music career after his wife died.
Drooper	The Banana Splits	Bass player for The Banana Splits, an all-animal band.
El Cutisimo	Wild Kratts	A lion cub who was named by Aviva.
Erma	Tenchi Muyo! GXP	
Florrie	Madagascar: Escape 2 Africa	Alex's mother and Zuba's wife. She is the alpha lioness of the pride.
Fred	Super Chicken	Fred was the lion sidekick of Super Chicken, a regular segment character in the Jay Ward-Bill Scott series George of the Jungle
Gabriel's Lion	Oshiri Kajiri Mushi	
Galaxy Federation Police Central Commander	Dokkoida?!	
Gold	Majuu Sensen: The Apocalypse	
Granite	Jewelpet	A white lion who represents Security. He wears a light blue pearl necklace with a pentagram-shaped blue granite rock around his neck.
Gregory	My Gym Partner's a Monkey	
He Who Breathes Fire	Wild Kratts	A five-year-old lion weighing in at 400 lbs (180 kg). He has a pride made up of two females and six cubs.
Lambert the Sheepish Lion	Lambert the Sheepish Lion	
Kiara	The Lion King franchise	Simba and Nala's daughter and therefore princess of the Pridelands
Kimba	Kimba the White Lion	The title character of Osamu Tezuka's manga/anime, Kimba the White Lion. He was renamed "Leo" in its spinoff, Leo the Lion.
King	Nadia: The Secret of Blue Water	White lion's cub and Nadia's pet friend.
King Leonidas	Bedknobs and Broomsticks	
Kion	The Lion Guard	Kiara's younger brother who is the fiercest and the leader of the Lion Guard.
Larry	Father of the Pride	A white lion who worked for Siegfried & Roy.
Laval	Legends of Chima	The Prince of the Lion tribe.
Lil' Cubby	Wild Kratts	A lion cub who was named by Koki.
Lion	Legends of Oz: Dorothy's Return	
Lion	Steven Universe	A pink lion who is owned by Steven Universe and previously met his mother Rose Quartz. He gained pink fur and the ability to teleport after Rose resurrected him.
Lion	Slap Happy Lion	Title Character lion maned red 1947
Lippy The Lion	Lippy the Lion & Hardy Har Har	Title character of the 1962 Hanna-Barbera animated series.
Martin	Wild Kratts	A lion cub who was named by Aviva after he fell into blue paint.
Mufasa	The Lion King franchise	Simba's father. The first Lion King of Pride Rock featured. Killed by Scar half way in the film. James Earl Jones voiced both the 1994 animated film and also reprised his role in 2019 remake.
Nala	The Lion King franchise	Sarafina's daughter and Simba's best friend, later mate.
Rani	The Lion Guard	An Asiatic lion who is the leader of the Night Pride and the queen of the Tree of Life. Her name means "Queen" in Hindi.
Sarabi	The Lion King franchise	Simba's mother.
Sarafina	The Lion King franchise	Nala's mother.
Scar	The Lion King franchise	Mufasa's brother, jealous of Simba's position as next in line for the Lion King title. He is voiced by Jeremy Irons, David Oyelowo, and Chiwetel Ejiofor
Simba	The Lion King franchise	The title character of The Lion King. Voiced by Matthew Broderick, Cam Clarke, Rob Lowe and Donald Glover He is the son of Mufasa and Sarabi, nephew of Scar, husband of Nala, and father of Kiara and Kion in the sequel and TV series. The name "Simba" comes from the Swahili word for "lion".
Screen Saver	Wild Kratts	A lion cub who was named by Koki after he claws the Tortuga's screen.
Kovu	The Lion King II: Simba's Pride	Zira's son, Scar's chosen heir, and Kiara's mate. His name means "scar" in Swahili.
Leo	Merrie Melodies	Appears in four shorts The Lyin' Mouse, The Lion's Busy, Hold the Lion, Please and Acrobatty Bunny. The latter who he co-starred with Bugs Bunny.
Makunga	Madagascar: Escape 2 Africa	Zuba and Alex's rival and main antagonist
Mayor Lionheart	Zootopia	Voiced by J.K. Simmons, the noble mayor of Zootopia
Montana Jones	Montana Jones	Lead character
Nuka	The Lion King II: Simba's Pride	Zira's elder son, brother of Vitani and Kovu.
Prince John	Robin Hood	The greedy villain of Disney's 1973 animated feature film Robin Hood.
Raja Ga Waurua	Tenchi Muyo! GXP	
Parsley	The Herbs	A simple, friendly lion. He does not usually talk, but always sings, "I'm a very friendly lion called Parsley". His best friends are Dill the dog and Sage the owl, but he is normally seen with Rosemary, Basil and Bayleaf the gardener.
Samson	The Wild	The protagonist of the film who tells his son, Ryan about Samson the wild. Samson is voiced by Kiefer Sutherland
Socrates	Animals United	A vegetarian lion who has a scar on his face and a best friend to Billy the Meerkat. Socrates is voiced by Thomas Fritsch in the German version of the film and Stephen Fry in the English dub
Reginald	64 Zoo Lane	A lion whose naps are often disturbed.
Ryan	The Wild	Samson's son who tries to roar just like his dad. He is voiced by Greg Cipes
Willy Fog	Around the World with Willy Fog	XIX-styled voyager and main character of the series.
Wildcat	TaleSpin	A friend of Baloo's and a mechanic of Higher for Hire.
Vampire King (lion)	Adventure Time	He turned into a lion after his vampire essence has been extracted.
Various lions	Adventure Time	
Vitani	The Lion King II: Simba's Pride	Zira's daughter and sister of Nuka and Kovu.
Zira	The Lion King II: Simba's Pride	The main antagonist of the film, mother of Nuka, Vitani and Kovu.
Zuba	Madagascar: Escape 2 Africa	Alex's father who is an alpha lion.

== Tigers ==
Name	Work	Notes
Baby Blue, Camo and Tackle	Wild Kratts	Queen Stealth's children.
Battle Cat	Masters of the Universe	A large green tiger, with yellow stripes, who serves as He-Man's fighting mount.
Cool Cat	Looney Tunes	A tiger scarf with beret debut 1967
Geobaldi	Outlanders	
Giant Realistic Flying Tiger	Uncle Grandpa	Her personality is a cross between that of a stereotypical teenage girl, a house cat and a real-life tiger.
Goji	Kody Kapow	A white tiger and friend of Kody and Mei.
Kagetora	Yaiba	A tiger and his yaiba
Nahal	Shimmer and Shine	Shine’s pet tiger.
Queen Stealth	Wild Kratts	A female Bengal tiger who lives in the rainforests of India.
Ragland T. "Rags" Tiger	Crusader Rabbit	Crusader Rabbit's sidekick.
Rajah	Aladdin franchise	Jasmine's pet tiger.
Shere Khan	The Jungle Book/TaleSpin	The main antagonist of the franchise, variously voiced by George Sanders, Tony Jay and Idris Elba.
Shimajirou Shimano	Shima Shima Tora no Shimajirou	One of the main characters and is the main protagonist. He is a bright and energetic tiger who lives donuts and soccer.
Shoko's tiger	Adventure Time	A white tiger who is Shoko's loyal companion.
Taiga	Nagasarete Airantou	
Tiger	Adventure Time	A tiger that first appeared during the song montage in the episode "Evicted!".
Tiger Claw	Teenage Mutant Ninja Turtles	A Japanese boy who the Kraang mutated into an humanoid tiger.
Tigger	Winnie the Pooh franchise	An anthropomorphic tiger with a bouncy tail who resides in the Hundred Acre Wood.
Tigress	Kung Fu Panda	A South China tiger who is the strongest and boldest warrior of the Furious Five.
Vitaly	Madagascar 3: Europe's Most Wanted	A Siberian tiger with a Russian accent, voiced by Bryan Cranston
White Tiger	The Justice Friends	An anthropomorphic tiger and a companion to the Justice Friends.

== Other ==
Name	Species	Work	Notes
Baby Puss	Smilodon	The Flintstones	Pet of Fred Flintstone who locks Fred out of the house at the end of each episode.
Baby Jaguar	Jaguar	Dora the Explorer/Go Diego Go!	Diego's pet jaguar cub and sidekick.
Bonkers D. Bobcat	Bobcat	Bonkers	A Toon policeman working with Detective Lucky Piquel to stamp out Toon criminals from Hollywood.
Catbus	A shapeshifting feline	My Neighbor Totoro	A friend/aspect of Totoro, shaped like a bus and capable of delivering people in need to any specific place.
Diego	Smilodon	Ice Age	Voiced by Denis Leary, one of the main characters in the movies.
Do-A-Lot	Panther	Working with Words (Journey Through the Jungle of Words)	A jungle girl panther with blue fur, who is paired up with a monkey named Seealot.
Xiao	Eurasian lynx	Kung Fu Panda: The Paws of Destiny	A kind-hearted lynx who rules the forbidden city
Felix	Iberian lynx	The Missing Lynx	A clumsy and unlucky sort.
Gia	Jaguar	Madagascar 3: Europe's Most Wanted	An anthropomorphic jaguar who is part of a European circus troupe.
Hang Time	Caracal	Wild Kratts	A female caracal who steals Aviva's birdie that is a precious family heirloom, then Martin and Chris go after her and get it back from her kittens.
Kutal	Liger	Shinzo	An Earth-elemental humanoid cat Enterran.
Lenny	Homotherium	Ice Age	A rotund Homotherium and a member of Soto's pack.
Louie	Mountain lion	Chip 'n Dale: Rescue Rangers, Mickey Mouse Works, House of Mouse	An oafish mountain lion who often targets Goofy or Donald Duck.
Manchas	Jaguar	Zootopia	A black jaguar who drives in the limo. One of the missing mammals that turned savage in Zootopia.
Oscar	Smilodon	Ice Age	A tall Smilodon and a member of Soto's pack.
Pawbert	Canada lynx	Zootopia 2	A clumsy lynx who is an outcast member of the prominent Lynxley family.
Pink Panther	Panther	The Pink Panther Show	The main and title character in the opening and closing credit sequences of every film in The Pink Panther series except for A Shot in the Dark and Inspector Clouseau. His popularity spawned a series of theatrical shorts, merchandise, a comic book, and television cartoons. He starred in 124 shorts (either theatrical or televised), 10 television shows and three prime time specials. He's also known as Nathu and Pangu in East and South Asia and Paulchen Panther (Little Paul the Panther) in Germany.
Pete Puma	Puma	Rabbit's Kin, Tiny Toon Adventures	Voiced by Stan Freberg
Pounce More	Caracal	Wild Kratts	A caracal kitten named by Martin, and is the son of Hang Time.
Serval	Serval	Kemono Friends	One of the two main charactes in the 2017 anime Kemono Friends, also the mascot of the Kemono Friends multimedia franchise.
Shadow	Jaguar	Wild Kratts	A young black jaguar cub living in the lowland tropical rain forests of Central America.
Shira	Smilodon	Ice Age: Continental Drift	A member of Captain Gutt's pirate crew and Diego's mate. Voiced by Jennifer Lopez.
Snagglepuss	Mountain lion	The Yogi Bear Show	A Hanna-Barbera cartoon character created in 1959, a pink anthropomorphic mountain lion voiced by Daws Butler. He is best known for his famous catchphrase, "Heavens to Murgatroyd!", along with phrases such as "Exit, stage left!" Snagglepuss was originally known as "Snaggletooth" (a pink lion precursor).
Soto	Smilodon	Ice Age	The main antagonist of the first film and Diego's former leader.
Trouble	Cougar	Ed, Edd n Eddy	Eddy's pet cougar.
Zeke	Smilodon	Ice Age	A small Smilodon and member of Soto's pack.
