= The Legend of Tarzan (TV series) =

2001–2003 animated TV series

- Also known as: Disney's The Legend of Tarzan
- Genre: Animated series Action; Adventure; Comedy
- Based on: Tarzan
- Developed by: Bill Motz; Bob Roth
- Directed by: Nicholas Filippi; Don MacKinnon; Steve Loter; Sean Bishop; Victor Cook
- Voices of: Michael T. Weiss; Olivia d'Abo; Jeff Bennett; Jim Cummings; April Winchell; Susanne Blakeslee; Nicollette Sheridan
- Opening theme: "Two Worlds" by Phil Collins
- Composer: Don Harper
- Country of origin: United States
- Original language: English
- No. of seasons: 2
- No. of episodes: 39

Production
- Executive producers: Bill Motz; Bob Roth
- Producer: Steve Loter
- Running time: 22 minutes
- Production company: Walt Disney Television Animation (Note: Animation outsourced to Walt Disney Animation Australia, Wang Film Productions, Hong Guang Animation (Suzhou), Toon City Animation, Rough Draft Korea, The Hana Animation Company and Jade Animation.)

Original release
- Network: UPN (Disney's One Too)
- Release: September 3, 2001 – February 5, 2003

Related
- Tarzan; Tarzan II; Tarzan & Jane

The Legend of Tarzan is an American animated television series produced by Walt Disney Television Animation, based on Tarzan from the novels written by Edgar Rice Burroughs, the character's original creator who appears in one episode of the series. The series is also based on Disney's 1999 animated feature film Tarzan by Walt Disney Pictures and aired initially on the Disney's One Too block on UPN from September 3, 2001 to February 5, 2003. However, reruns were broadcast shortly after on Toon Disney.

The series picks up where Disney's 1999 animated feature film left off, with the title character adjusting to his new role as leader of the gorilla family following Kerchak's death, along with Jane, who he has since married, and her father, Professor Archimedes Q. Porter, adjusting to life in the jungle. The three now reside in the treehouse built by Tarzan's late parents.

== Characters ==
=== Main ===
- Tarzan (voiced by Michael T. Weiss) has assumed his role as leader of the gorillas. He has married Jane and they live in the jungle, residing in the treehouse that Tarzan's late parents had built before their deaths. Although Tarzan does not live with Kala and the other gorillas, Tarzan will still take action to protect them and often seeks Kala's advice in dealing with situations. While Tarzan helps Jane get over her romantic ideas about jungle life, she acts as his guide to the duplicity of human nature, and insists he eats his food from a plate. It is a never-ending growth process for both, with insights into what "being civilized" means. Weiss replaces Tony Goldwyn.
- Jane (voiced by Olivia d'Abo) is married to Tarzan. She has settled into her new jungle life with Tarzan. When she begins to miss her old life in England, she tries to get Tarzan to act more "civilized", which sometimes poses problems to Tarzan's character. Her appearance and human actions often cause some members of Tarzan's gorilla tribe to have doubts about her and question Tarzan's leadership. D'Abo replaces Minnie Driver.
- Terk (voiced by April Winchell) is a fun-loving gorilla, and Tarzan's closest friend and older adoptive cousin. She has a soft-spot for Tarzan and is convinced that he cannot survive without her, despite Tarzan having proven repeatedly to be quicker, stronger and more powerful at just about everything in the jungle than Terk. Winchell replaces Rosie O'Donnell.
- Tantor (voiced by Jim Cummings) is an elephant, who is paranoid and nervous, but protective of Tarzan and his friends. He shares a close bond with Terk and Archimedes Porter. Cummings replaces Wayne Knight.
- Kala (voiced by Susanne Blakeslee) acts as the voice of the apes, reminding Tarzan of his particular obligations to the family. She is also Jane's closest friend. The two share a warm, strong bond and Jane regards her mother-in-law as her only kindred spirit in the jungle. From Kala's point of view, Jane is the daughter that she never had. Her open mind is a well of great wisdom and she is almost always right. Blakeslee replaces Glenn Close.
- Professor Archimedes Q. Porter (voiced by Jeff Bennett) is a noted scientist with years of expertise studying gorillas, although before arriving in Africa in the first film, he had never seen one in the wild. Sometimes the well-meaning professor gets absorbed in his thinking but often forgets what he is doing. Bennett replaces Nigel Hawthorne.
- Kerchak (voiced by Lance Henriksen) was the mate of Kala and the adoptive father of Tarzan. He had died during the events of the film and appears in flashbacks in the series.

=== Allies ===
- Flynt (voiced by Erik von Detten) and Mungo (voiced by Jason Marsden) are gorilla brothers, who grew up along, with Tarzan. While the brothers mean no harm, their dumb behavior may cause conflict for Tarzan. Since they spend all their time together, being separated for any length of time, makes them anxious.
- Buto is the lead bull of a crash of western black rhinoceros.
- Leopard Cub (voiced by Frank Welker) is a lost leopard cub friend, find a mother leopard are Tarzan and friends, before Tarzan fight Sabor the leopard in first film.
- Manu (voiced by Frank Welker) is a mischievous baby baboon, who is fascinated, with humans. He often rummages through their belongings by trying on their clothes. Welker replaces Dee Bradley Baker.
- Renard Dumont (voiced by René Auberjonois) is a slick, opportunistic French proprietor who operates a trading post. Although somewhat of a nemesis in his first appearance, he later becomes a reluctant ally of Tarzan.
- Hugo (voiced by Dave Thomas) and Hooft (voiced by Joe Flaherty) are deserters of the French Foreign Legion, who work for Dumont. Although they are smooth-talking conmen, who try to cheat people out of money, they are good-natured and willing to do anything for their friends. They are based on the actors, Bob Hope and Bing Crosby, whom Thomas and Flaherty are known to have previously impersonated on SCTV.
- Jabari (voiced by Taylor Dempsey) is the son of Biruti and Jamila. He and Tantor had bonded over their shared phobias and paranoia.
- Chief Keewazi (voiced by James Avery) is the leader of the Waziri, an African tribe who live deep in the jungle.
- Basuli (voiced by Phil LaMarr) is Keewazi's headstrong son and the future leader of the Waziri tribe. He becomes a good friend of Tarzan. Tarzan had once aided Basuli in retrieving an eagle's feather, which he had needed as part of a rite of passage in order to marry. Although he and Tarzan are friends, they compete in many ways.
- Dr. Robin Doyle (voiced by Sheena Easton) is an Irish anthropologist, with who Archimedes Q. Porter is smitten. The first time that, she came to Africa was to study the Waziri with him; unbeknownst to her, he was afraid he was too old for her and sought out a fountain that, he thought would, make the drinker young again.
- Ian (voiced by Jake Dinwiddie) is Robin Doyle's nephew. He is a lonely and intelligent boy, who feels displaced and misunderstood, by his classmates, due to his passion for both science and butterflies. Tarzan takes him under his wing and encourages him to experience the beauty and excitement of the jungle to leave his fears behind.
- Moyo (voiced by Neil Patrick Harris) is another gorilla in Tarzan's family. Despite his arrogance and stubbornness, when the elephants and gorillas engage in jungle warfare, Moyo plays a big part in helping Tarzan lead the gorillas to victory.
- Hazel, (voiced by Tara Strong), Greenly (voiced by Grey DeLisle) and Eleanor (voiced by Nicollette Sheridan) are three upper-class Englishwomen and Jane's old friends, who came to the jungle to "save" her from Tarzan.
- Mangani is a spirit, who wanders around the jungle curing sick and wounded animals, apparently drawing his powers from the full moon. He takes the form of a white gorilla.

=== Villains ===
- William Cecil Clayton was the antagonist from the film, responsible for Kerchak's death. He was killed fighting Tarzan, which caused his sister Lady Waltham to seek revenge on Tarzan.
- Tublat (voiced by Keith David) is a rogue gorilla and a former member of Tarzan's family. He had challenged Kerchak for leadership, but was defeated and cast out for trying to cheat. He shares his name with Kala's mate in the original books, although his personality is much more equivalent to that of the books' incarnation of Kerchak.
- Queen La (voiced by Diahann Carroll) - In the original novels, she was a high priestess of a blood cult who fell in love, with Tarzan. In her adaptation for the series, she is a former member of the Waziri tribe and a sorceress who rules the abandoned city of Opar. She falls in love with Tarzan after he comes to rescue Archimedes Porter from the Leopard Men.
- Samuel T. Philander (voiced by Craig Ferguson) is Archimedes Porter's academic rival, who frequently attempts to steal his ideas or garner fame by turning Tarzan in as the "missing link". Philander is modeled after actor Terry-Thomas.
- Count Nikolas Rokoff (voiced by Ron Perlman) is a greedy former Russian count stripped of his title, who hears about a treasure in the valley of the leopards and plans to find it to regain his title. Tarzan refuses to help him, until Rokoff threatens to kill Jane if he does not. His intellectual battle with Tarzan goes like a chess game until Tarzan finally releases the last few leopards from the boarded-up cave on him.
- Lt. Colonel Staquait (voiced by Jim Cummings) is a vicious, scar-faced colonel in the French Foreign Legion. He sees himself on the right side of the law, but his draconian methods do not justify his actions, putting him at odds with Tarzan. He acts as judge and executioner, and has made it his goal to hunt down Hugo and Hooft because they had refused his order to burn down a village full of women and children. Tarzan had helped fake their deaths, but eventually Staquait learned the truth, captured and imprisoned them.
- Thaddeus Hunt (voiced by Kevin Michael Richardson) is the leader of a band of kidnappers who try to abduct Tarzan and former US President Theodore Roosevelt for ransom.
- Nuru and Sheeta (both voiced by Frank Welker) are two vicious black panthers who frequently battle Tarzan.
- Mabaya (voiced by Frank Welker) is a rogue bull elephant who originally belonged to the same herd as Jabari and his parents. Mabaya, like all rogues, is almost constantly angry and attacks or tramples anything in his path. He is recognized by his broken right tusk and bloodshot red eyes.
- Hista (voiced by Frank Welker) is a giant red python who threatens the gorilla family, until Tarzan and Moyo lured her into a tar pit, where she drowns. Like all other snakes, Hista has poor vision and senses body heat to hunt, a weakness that Tarzan uses to his advantage.
- Johannes Niels (voiced by John O'Hurley) and Merkus (voiced by Jim Cummings) are two miners who first came to the jungle to mine diamonds. Niels is tall, blond-haired and the calmer of the two, while Merkus is shorter, muscular and trigger-happy. Tarzan agreed to guide them to a volcano to dig for diamonds, on the condition that he gets one to give to Jane. After a mishap, they lose all of their diamonds and leave in chains. They later return to retrieve the diamonds, which may not have survived the lava, and are attacked by Tublat, whom they capture and are about to take him around the world as a showpiece until Tarzan, along with a protesting Terk, rescue him. Once again, Niels and Merkus leave the jungle empty-handed.
- Zutho (voiced by Jason Alexander) is a shady mandrill whom Tarzan, Terk, and Tantor first encountered as children at the forbidden side of the river. After Tarzan taught Zutho and his friends, Gozan and Hugo how to make spears, a fire broke out and almost destroyed the jungle, although a fortuitously timed rainstorm put it out. Tarzan blamed himself and begged Zutho not to inform Kala of what had transpired, with Zutho declaring the boy to be in his debt. Years later, Zutho resurfaces to get Tarzan to repay the debt by dealing with some annoying monkeys who were keeping him up at night. With help from Jane, Terk and Tantor, Tarzan did the right thing and admitted what happened the day of the fire to Kala, who then dealt with Zutho.
- Ian McTeague (voiced by Charles Napier) is a corrupt and greedy businessman. He started an illegal mining operation near the mountain, where he and his men believe that there is gold for them to dig. McTeague's actions end up poisoning the river with chemicals.
- Lady Waltham (voiced by Amanda Donohoe) is an aristocrat and sister of Clayton, who wants revenge on Tarzan for the death of her brother. She had her valet Hobson capture Jane, Terk, Tantor and Archimedes Porter, and then poisoned Tarzan. She then challenged him to either save his loved ones from danger or head to a mountain she dubbed "Clayton's Peak", where she claimed the antidote was located. Tarzan chooses to save his friends and family, and even ends up saving Lady Waltham from Nuru and Sheeta. Afterwards, she gave Tarzan the antidote, after realizing that Tarzan would never have killed her brother on purpose. She is implied to have made peace, with Tarzan and his family and returned to her original life.
- Muviro (voiced by Kevin Michael Richardson) is a treacherous Waziri warrior and one of Basuli's subordinates. Despite serving Basuli, Muviro holds a grudge against him and is hostile toward outsiders. Upon learning that Basuli is planning to get an eagle's feather, with Tarzan's help, as part of the custom for Basuli to marry and be a future chief, Muviro secretly plots to dispose of Basuli in order to become the new chief.
- Robert Canler (voiced by Jeff Bennett) is Jane's childhood friend and neighbor. He is an ace pilot who carries a sword-cane with a silver eagle head and a Webley pistol, and flies in a plane with floats. He had once worked for British Intelligence, but switched to the "other side" as a double agent when he had realized how profitable it would be by bringing them a code machine that he gave Jane. Despite his betrayal of Jane, he rescues her from certain death before being arrested by Nigel Taylor.

=== Supporting ===
- Dania (voiced by Kathy Najimy) is a female elephant, who wants to be, with Tantor for her love. Terk gets the two elephants together and they hit it off. Dania meets Tantor's friends except for Tarzan, who is tracking poachers. Dania strongly dislikes Terk, regarding her as obnoxious and loud.
- Bob Markham (voiced by Mark Harmon) is a logger, widower and single father to his daughter, Abby. But the way he was logging tore up so much soil that, a long-dormant plague was released and threatened to kill his men and daughter.
- Abigail "Abby" Markham (voiced by Nicolette Little) is the daughter of Bob Markham. She appears to be around 5–9 years old. Markham loves his daughter and will do anything for her. When she falls ill, with the same plague that, threatens his men, he asks for Tarzan's help to cure her.
- Gobu (voiced by Tate Donovan) is a gorilla from another family. Tarzan and Terk had saved him from being attacked, by hyenas, only ending, with a broken leg. Terk felt she was not girly enough for him. He had managed to trick Tarzan, into coming, with him to his family so that, he could meet his leader. Tarzan then finds out that, Tublat is his leader. He had showed up a few months ago and had killed Gobu's original leader. Tublat and Tarzan prepare for battle, but Gobu stands up to him and reminds everyone that, there is strength in numbers, and the gorillas gang up on Tublat, driving him off. Gobu then steps in to take the place as the new leader. Terk tries her lady charms, but Gubo tells her that, he always liked Terk the way she is. They both end up leaving to throw mud at warthogs.
- Edgar Rice Burroughs (voiced by Steven Weber) is a fictionalized version of Tarzan's creator, he is an American book author, who had needed inspiration for his next novel. He eventually finds it, when discovering about Tarzan. After meeting some of Tarzan's acquaintances, he finally meets Tarzan, when Tarzan saves him. After speaking with Tarzan and Jane, he creates a novel and his boss says everyone will remember him, by it.
- Theodore Roosevelt (voiced by Stephen Root) is the former President of the United States. Roosevelt appeared in the show based on the Smithsonian–Roosevelt African Expedition, a real-life trip Roosevelt took to Africa after his presidency to collect wildlife for the American Museum of Natural History of New York City.

== Episodes ==
=== Series overview ===
Season	Episodes	Originally released	
Season	Episodes	First released	Last released
1	36	September 3, 2001	October 14, 2001
2	3	February 3, 2003	February 5, 2003

=== Season 1 (2001–03) ===
No.	Title	Directed by	Written by	Original release date	ABC airdate	Prod. code
1	"Tarzan and the Race Against Time"	Nicholas Filippi	Gary Sperling	September 3, 2001	July 13, 2002	1C21-002
Terk becomes jealous when Tarzan spends more time with Jane than with her and Tantor. After Tarzan is bitten by a venomous spider, Jane and the others learn that the only cure is the Mububu flower, found on the top of a waterfall. Terk thinks that Jane is not suited for jungle life, so she makes a bet that Jane cannot make it. But as Tarzan's condition worsens, the two realize that they must put aside their differences if they are to obtain the flower necessary for Professor Porter's antidote.
2	"Tarzan and the Trading Post"	Nicholas Filippi	Eddie Guzelian	September 4, 2001	July 20, 2002	1C21-004
Renard Dumont, a French proprietor, builds a trading post along the coast of Africa, near where Tarzan and his family live. Tarzan allows the newcomers to stay but quickly realizes that with the trading post now present the rhinos have been driven from their feeding grounds into gorilla lands. Tarzan, Jane, and the others find a way to move the rhinos, before Kala and her family will be forced to move away.
3	"Tarzan and the Lost Cub"	Don MacKinnon & Steve Loter	Michael Ryan	September 5, 2001	July 27, 2002	1C21-008
While doing laundry, Jane comes across a leopard cub, who follows her. Seeing that it is alone, she convinces Terk and Tantor to watch it while she prepares Tarzan for the idea. At first, Tarzan gets repulsed over it and wants the cub to be left alone in the jungle (due to his hatred of leopards and because his real human parents were killed by Sabor), but Kala and Jane remind him of Kala's own decision to give him a chance and Tarzan reluctantly agrees. The leopard cub is very playful and proves to be a handful for Terk and Tantor, who lose sight of it and the cub causes trouble with the baboons. Jane, seeing the hopelessness of the situation, goes with Kala (on her advice) to return it to the other leopards, but all goes wrong until Tarzan rescues them and the mother leopard arrives. Grateful for the return of her cub, the mother leopard allows Jane and the others safe passage, and later visits the group with her cub.
4	"Tarzan and the Lost City of Opar"	Nicholas Filippi	Bill Motz & Bob Roth	September 6, 2001	August 3, 2002	1C21-017
After Professor Porter is taken captive by the Leopard Men, Tarzan and the others track him to the lost city of Opar, ruled by a strange woman La, who after seeing Tarzan fight to rescue the professor, falls in love with him. Unfortunately, Tarzan is Jane's devoted husband, so La plans to get rid of Jane, and make Tarzan her husband and king of Opar.
5	"Tarzan and the Fugitives"	Don MacKinnon	Liz Friedman & Vanessa Place	September 7, 2001	August 10, 2002	1C21-007
Tarzan and Jane meet Hugo and Hooft, who are deserters of the French Legion led by the nefarious Lt. Col. Staquait, rescuing and taking them in. These smooth-talking, good-natured con-men teach Tarzan a thing or two about gambling and profit, and eat, swim and enjoy life in the jungle, somewhat at Jane's expense (to her annoyance), so when Staquait comes for the deserters (who are "criminals"), Jane turns them in only to realize that the crime was refusal to commit a war crime by destroying the village populated by humans. Despite feeling betrayed and used, Tarzan and Jane realize that the real criminal is Staquait, and rescue Hugo and Hooft, giving them jobs working for Renard at the trading post.
6	"Tarzan and the Rogue Elephant"	Sean Bishop	Mirith J. Colao	September 9, 2001	August 17, 2002	1C21-005
After Mabaya, a rogue elephant, plows through an elephant herd, Jabari and many other elephants are forced to move to where Tarzan lives to escape the path. Jabari befriends Tantor and they bond over their mutual fear of things. However, when Jabari says that the African Violet causes an elephant to go rogue, Tantor (who has eaten these flowers for years) is convinced he is a rogue, and even more so after Mabaya stampedes through the jungle, causing him to run away. Jabari learns that the African violets do not make an elephant go rogue and Tarzan has gone after Mabaya, finding himself no match for the rogue elephant. Tantor must overcome his fears to help both his friend and the jungle.
7	"Tarzan and the Poisoned River (Part 1)"	Don MacKinnon	Peter Gaffney	September 10, 2001	August 24, 2002	1C21-010
Tantor returns from the nearby river suffering from some sort of poison. After analyzing it, Professor Porter concludes that it must have come from the river, and so Tarzan and his friends convince Dumont to allow them to borrow his boat, as the poison will affect trade and jungle life. Terk stays behind with Tantor, while the others travel upriver, only to have their boat blown up by pressure caused by hippos. Going ahead, Tarzan encounters Basuli, son of Chief Keewazi of the Waziri tribe, who say that men dressed like Jane and the Professor dug in the mountainside. Meanwhile, Tantor has somehow gotten better and with Terk goes after his friends. Basuli shows Tarzan a mysterious cave shaped like a skull head.
8	"Tarzan and the Poisoned River (Part 2)"	Don MacKinnon	Gary Sperling	September 11, 2001	August 31, 2002	1C21-016
Tarzan and Basuli, upon further exploration, discover that the cave leads to a mine under the direction of a greedy businessman named McTeague. Meanwhile, Jane and Professor Porter inform Keewazi that due to the chemical separation of dirt from ores, the chemicals are being dumped and polluted into the river. Tarzan and Basuli infiltrate the mine, but are captured by McTeague. With some help from latecomers Terk and Tantor, Jane and Professor Porter rescue the pair, who have become friends through their trials together. Jane then proposes they build a dam, to cut off the water flow. When McTeague sees this and demands to have the water back, Keewazi releases the river for the flash flood to destroy the mine, forcing McTeague and his men to surrender and flee. After this, Tarzan makes peace with the Waziri. Note: This episode was coincidentally aired the same day as the 9/11 terrorist attacks.
9	"Tarzan and the Enemy Within"	Nicholas Filippi	Ken Koonce & David Weimers	September 12, 2001	September 7, 2002	1C21-019
Tarzan and Terk find an injured gorilla named Gobu, who was attacked by hyenas and unaware that he is under orders from his leader to lure Tarzan back to Gobu's family. Once the injured gorilla is better, he and Tarzan embark on the long journey to Gobu's home, only to find Tublat, the aggressive bull ape whom Kerchak exiled many years before and has killed the group's original leader, lies in wait. Meanwhile, Jane and Professor Porter attempt to teach Terk to be more lady-like to impress Gobu.
10	"Tarzan and the Fountain"	Nicholas Filippi	Story by : Evelyn Gabai; Teleplay by : Eddie Guzelian	September 13, 2001	September 14, 2002	1C21-011
The Professor eagerly awaits the arrival of a colleague, Doctor Robin Doyle, who has come to Africa to study Keewazi's tribe with the Professor, but upon arrival all are surprised to find that Doctor Doyle is a woman. During their study, they find some of the older men to have quite startling ages (from 500 to 700) and learn about a great fountain that may be responsible for their apparent longevity. Professor Porter, who likes Robin but feels he is too old for her, secretly sets out to find the fountain.
11	"Tarzan and the Hidden World"	Victor Cook	Mark Palmer	September 14, 2001	September 21, 2002	1C21-018
Samuel T. Philander, Professor Porter's academic rival who often takes credit for the Professor's findings and research, visits Africa believing that the Professor has found something spectacular there. The Professor does discover something, but only after Philander arrives. Tarzan shows Jane and him Pellucidar, a hidden land beneath Africa where Dinosaurs still live. Philander takes a camera (not knowing that a baby baboon had already used up all the film taking pictures of itself), but the Professor has none, so (unknown to the others) he tries to steal a Tyrannosaurus rex egg which hatches. This arouses the fury of the mother, who chases them until Porter returns the egg and they escape. Meanwhile, Philander returns to London to unveil his proof of living dinosaurs – only to discover the baboon's pictures instead.
12	"Tarzan and the Rift"	Don MacKinnon	Leslie Nordman	September 16, 2001	September 28, 2002	1C21-024
Tantor's new girlfriend thinks Terk is loud and obnoxious, and forces Tantor to choose between them. Meanwhile, poachers are operating in the jungle and capture Terk.
13	"Tarzan and the Giant Beetles"	Victor Cook	Carl Ellsworth	September 17, 2001	October 5, 2002	1C21-012
Tantor and Terk accompany the Professor on an expedition to study giant flora and their clumsiness almost ends in disaster. Tantor wants to confess, but Terk prefers covering up the truth. Professor Porter manages to collect some plant liquid from the giant flowers, which Terk inadvertently spills onto some beetles, making them grow to gigantic proportions. Terk still tries to hide her and Tantor's involvement, but it is not long before both the lies are piling up and the beetles are on a rampage of destruction.
14	"Tarzan and the Jungle Madness"	Victor Cook	Madellaine Paxson	September 18, 2001	October 12, 2002	1C21-023
Tarzan and Jane leave the Waziri Village by a riverboat piloted by Hugo and Hooft. When they land, they notice that Dumont's trading post is really growing and modernizing. They also notice that the jungle is eerily quiet with no animal sounds to be heard. When they return home they find the tree house is in shambles as is the professor's camp and he has disappeared. Terk and Tantor burst into the camp complaining of a ringing in their heads and started acting violently. Soon Tarzan and Jane are on the run for their lives as all of the jungle animals have turned their backs on them in a psychotic rage. Later, while hiding from the animals, Tarzan discovers that the ringing the animals hear is due to a recent radio broadcasting tower built at Dumont's trading post. After Tarzan tricks them into destroying the tower, the animals went back to their normal selves again.
15	"Tarzan and the Protege"	Nicholas Filippi	Randy Rogel	September 19, 2001	October 19, 2002	1C21-015
When Professor Porter's colleague Doctor Doyle returns to the jungle, she brings her introverted nephew Ian with her, and Tarzan befriends him to the point where Ian is acting almost exactly like Tarzan (to Jane's chagrin). Meanwhile, Professor Porter attempts to rekindle an old romance with the boy's overprotective aunt.
16	"Tarzan and the Leopard Men Rebellion"	Victor Cook	Ken Koonce & David Weimers	September 20, 2001	October 26, 2002	1C21-020
When the Leopard Men of Opar kidnap Jane, Tarzan insists Queen La to save Jane. But La has her own motives and so do the Leopard Men.
17	"Tarzan and the Rough Rider"	Don MacKinnon	Marv Wolfman	September 21, 2001	November 2, 2002	1C21-013
Former U.S. President Theodore Roosevelt is on safari in Africa when he becomes the focus of a kidnapping plot. It is up to Tarzan and the others to save him and show the former Rough Rider that there are other ways of learning about nature than by shooting it.
18	"Tarzan and the Seeds of Destruction"	Nicholas Filippi	Robert Askin	September 23, 2001	November 9, 2002	1C21-040
When the elephant pond turns smelly because of decaying vegetation after heavy rains, Jane plants a sweet-smelling (albeit non-native) flowery vine, but it grows out of control, leading to an ecological disaster and an all-out war between the elephants (whom the vine has driven out of their feeding territory) and the gorillas (whom Tarzan has persuaded to share their own territory with the elephants). Despite Jane and the Professor's best efforts, matters only turn worse, but Tarzan and Jane resolve to undo the mistake.
19	"Tarzan and the Silver Ape"	Don MacKinnon	John Behnke, Rob Humphrey & Jim Peterson	September 24, 2001	November 16, 2002	1C21-029
Samuel T. Philander is at it again and wants to scoop another one of Professor Porter's jungle discoveries in order to pay off his British creditors. This time, he finds out about the healing Silver Ape Mangani, which he captures in a cage. When Tarzan and Professor Porter attempt to rescue the ape from Philander's ship, Mangani proves his healing abilities in a miracle for Tarzan.
20	"Tarzan and the Challenger"	Nicholas Filippi	Michael Merton	September 25, 2001	November 23, 2002	1C21-021
A giant python named Hista is terrorizing the gorillas and Tarzan's leadership of the family is challenged by Moyo. Tarzan and Moyo work together to defeat Hista and save the family.
21	"Tarzan and the Outbreak"	Victor Cook	Madellaine Paxson	September 26, 2001	November 30, 2002	1C21-042
Tarzan goes to help a man named Markham when his workers and young daughter Abby fall ill with a deadly illness caused when their irresponsible logging unleashes a dormant plague, and the only cure may have been destroyed along with the cut-down trees.
22	"Tarzan and the Silver Screen"	Victor Cook	Madellaine Paxson	September 27, 2001	December 7, 2002	1C21-038
A film crew comes to make an action film and Tarzan becomes confused by the acting, with his actions resulting in him replacing the film's male lead as the star. Later, when the jealous actor tries to destroy the film footage containing Tarzan, it sets a trading post, ablaze, before they extinguish it.
23	"Tarzan and the Beast From Below"	Don MacKinnon	Ken Koonce & David Weimers	September 28, 2001	December 14, 2002	1C21-035
Terk gains an appreciation for Tantor's phobias when a Velociraptor (which has escaped from Pellucidar) scares her silly.
24	"Tarzan and the All-Seeing Elephant"	Nicholas Filippi	Mark Palmer	September 30, 2001	December 21, 2002	1C21-025
Tantor believes in an All-Seeing Elephant, but Terk does not. Tantor convinces Tarzan, Jane, and the Professor to go with him in search of the All-Seeing Elephant, and Terk comes along. On their journey, a rock avalanche occurs. Tantor sees Terk in trouble and protects her. Terk is surprised she is alive and tells everyone, "If my buddy wants to see the All-seeing Elephant, then he's seeing the All-seeing Elephant." But the journey becomes more difficult and dangerous.
25	"Tarzan and the New Wave"	Don MacKinnon	Jess Winfield	October 1, 2001	December 28, 2002	1C21-039
A schooner is sinking, and on board are Jane's friends Greenley, Eleanor, Hazel, and Greenley's fiancé, Henry. Eleanor and Hazel do not think Henry is very "well-rounded", and they hope exposing him to Tarzan can toughen him up. Henry's bravery, resourcefulness, and manliness are put to the test, when the four are swept away into the jungle by a earthquake and a tidal wave.
26	"Tarzan and the Lost Treasure"	Nicholas Filippi	John Behnke, Rob Humphrey & Jim Peterson	October 2, 2001	January 4, 2003	1C21-047
Count Nikolas Rokoff hears about a treasure in the valley of the leopards. He kidnaps Jane and plans to threaten her, forcing Tarzan to reveal the location of the treasure.
27	"Tarzan and the Return of La"	Victor Cook	Peter Gaffney	October 3, 2001	January 11, 2003	1C21-022
Jane is possessed by the spirit of Queen La. She dupes Dumont into escorting her to Opar, where she uses magic to rebuild it. Tarzan, with the help of Waziri elder Usula, sets out to stop her.
28	"Tarzan and One Punch Mulligan"	Sean Bishop	Gary Sperling	October 4, 2001	January 18, 2003	1C21-030
The arrogant and aggressive Heavyweight Boxing Champion "One Punch" Mulligan, along with his manager and personal journalist, visit the jungle while on a safari. When Tarzan accidentally knocks "One Punch" out cold, the boxer demands a rematch. Tarzan refuses; however, "One Punch" is stubborn and looks for a way to provoke Tarzan into a fight.
29	"Tarzan and the Missing Link"	Victor Cook	David Slack	October 5, 2001	January 25, 2003	1C21-044
Philander returns to Africa with two British thugs to capture "Tarzan: The Missing Link" in a last-ditch effort to pay off the thugs. While there, they meet up with Professor Porter and Philander attempts to convince the thugs that Porter is Tarzan.
30	"Tarzan and the Prison Break"	Troy Adomitis	Madellaine Paxson	October 7, 2001	February 1, 2003	1C21-037
Hugo and Hooft use Tarzan to help them gather special ingredients for their hot sauce. The sauce, with the guys' names on the bottle, becomes popular with the French Foreign Legion and is brought to the attention of Lt. Col. Staquait. Staquait then vows to re-capture Hugo and Hooft for deserting. He has not left without a plan, trapping Hooft, Hugo, and Tarzan in two separate nets, and takes Hugo and Hooft to the "Cape of Doom" Prison. While attempting to free his friends, Tarzan is captured and locked up in the prison. Only Jane can contact the Magistrate and settle this once and for all.
31	"Tarzan and the Eagle’s Feather"	Nicholas Filippi	David Slack	October 8, 2001	February 8, 2003	1C21-036
Tarzan and Jane are invited to the Waziri village for the wedding of Basuli and Naoh. As part of the ancient marriage ritual, Basuli must journey to a tall mountain and bring back an Eagle's feather. He is allowed to take one person with him and chooses Tarzan, which angers Muviro. Their journey is fraught with hardships, and Tarzan begins to wonder if someone is interfering.
32	"Tarzan and the Face From the Past"	Victor Cook	Gary Sperling	October 9, 2001	February 15, 2003	1C21-043
Zutho, a shady mandrill from Tarzan's past, resurfaces, demanding a favor he claims is owed for keeping a decades-old secret. Much of this episode takes place in flashback as Terk relates to Jane the events that allowed Zutho to gain such a hold over the lord of the jungle.
33	"Tarzan and the Caged Fury"	Dave Bullock	Ken Koonce & David Weimers	October 10, 2001	February 22, 2003	1C21-034
Niels and Merkus return to the jungle to retrieve the diamonds they were forced to leave behind after the events of "Tarzan and the Volcanic Diamond Mine". Tarzan agrees to this as long as they avoid the gorillas. Niels and Merkus are threatened by Tublat, whom they capture and plan to exploit as a tourist attraction for money. Tarzan sets out to free Tublat, despite Terk's warning.
34	"Tarzan and the Gauntlet of Vengeance"	Don MacKinnon	Jacob Motz, Madellaine Paxson & Michael Ryan	October 11, 2001	March 1, 2003	1C21-033
Seeking revenge on Tarzan, Clayton's sister, Lady Waltham (assisted by her valet, Hobson) kidnaps Jane, Tantor, Terk, and the Professor, placing each separately into a trap. Waltham falsely accuses Tarzan for murder. As Tarzan examines a locket featuring Waltham and Clayton, Tarzan recalls a flashback that Clayton died betraying Tarzan without mercy. Waltham injects Tarzan with a fatal poison (via blowdart) and informs him that the antidote lies far away on a distant mountain she has dubbed "Clayton's Peak". He, therefore, has a choice, she says – to suffer as she had (and lose those he loves) or as Clayton had (and lose his own life).
35	"Tarzan and the Mysterious Visitor"	Don MacKinnon	Madellaine Paxson	October 12, 2001	March 8, 2003	1C21-041
A writer named Ed is in desperate need of some inspiration for his next novel. He finds it while walking down the street in the form of a newspaper article about Tarzan, "The Missing Link". Ed has the inspiration he needs and begins tracking down various leads to Tarzan's whereabouts, including Samuel T. Philander, Hugo, Hooft, and Renard Dumont. They all tell Ed of their first encounters with Tarzan. Ed sets out into the jungle to find Tarzan alone. Note: This episode is most famous for the theme of a literary character meeting his own original creator (similar to The Little Mermaid episode "Metal Fish," wherein Ariel met her creator, Hans Christian Andersen), as well as the fact that it is almost completely composed of flashbacks from previous episodes. Taking the latter into consideration, this episode should also be considered the series finale, despite the fact that several other episodes were subsequently produced.
36	"Tarzan and Tublat’s Revenge"	Victor Cook	Randy Rogel	October 14, 2001	March 15, 2003	1C21-001
A hurricane hits the jungle, prompting Tarzan to lead his family, the Porters, and the gorillas to a network of caves in the mountains. When they reach there, they believe that they are safe, but they have chosen the same cave in which Tublat, a former member of the Tribe of Kerchak, lives. Physically, Tarzan is no match for Tublat, but he uses his superior cunning, reflexes and ingenuity to defeat him. Note: Given that this episode depicts the family's first encounter with Tublat since his exile, it properly belongs chronologically among the first few episodes in the series.

=== Season 2 (2003) ===
Note: All episodes of Season 2 were used in the plot of the direct-to-video sequel to the first film, Tarzan & Jane which came out on July 23, 2002, though some parts have been cut to make them look more like flashbacks. These episodes are believed to have happened sometime during or before Season 1, since some characters first appearances occurred in these episodes, the overall true specific order is unknown.

No.	Title	Directed by	Written by	Original release date	ABC airdate	Prod. code
37	"Tarzan and the British Invasion"	Don MacKinnon	Mirith J. Colao	February 3, 2003	March 22, 2003	1C21-003
Three of Jane's old friends from England -- Greenley, Hazel, and Eleanor -- arrive to "rescue" her from the "savage wild man" they have heard about. To their surprise, they learn that Jane stayed with Tarzan of her own choice. To prove that she has not changed, Jane takes her friends on a British-style picnic (Tarzan declines to join in, not wanting to pretend to be "civilized"), but when Nuru and Sheeta ambush the ladies and pursue them into the jungle, Tarzan comes to the rescue.
38	"Tarzan and the Volcanic Diamond Mine"	Victor Cook	John Behnke; Rob Humphrey & Jim Peterson	February 4, 2003	March 29, 2003	1C21-006
Johannes Niels and Merkus (in their chronologically first appearance) arrive in search of diamonds in a volcano. Tarzan guides them on condition that he can take one for Jane. Worried about Tarzan's sudden reticence, Jane follows his trail, with Terk and Archimedes in tow. As Niels and Merkus turn on Tarzan, and trap him with his wife and father-in-law, they work together to escape from the erupting volcano.
39	"Tarzan and the Flying Ace"	Victor Cook	Story by : David Bullock; Adam Van Wyk & Jess Winfield; Teleplay by : Jess Winfield	February 5, 2003	April 5, 2003	1C21-009
Royal Air Force pilot Robert Canler, who grew up alongside Jane, pays a visit. Tarzan is immediately suspicious of him, though with prodding from Terk, he soon dismisses it as jealousy. Robert is looking for a music box he gave to Jane, which is revealed to be a code machine, and when Jane discovers that Robert is acting as a double agent for enemy powers (most likely Germany), he turns on her. Meanwhile, Tarzan saves another RAF pilot, Nigel Taylor (who was after Robert in the first place), from Nuru and Sheeta. As Tarzan tries to stop Robert, the plane comes to the edge of a waterfall, and Robert saves Jane from certain death, but Taylor arrests him.

== Broadcast ==
In late 2001, UPN added The Legend of Tarzan to their Disney's One Too lineup. Reruns continued until September 2, 2003, when the series (along with Fillmore! and Buzz Lightyear of Star Command) was pre-empted in favor of three episodes of Recess. Reruns aired on Toon Disney until 2009 (and at some point, aired on the Jetix block) and when it converted to Disney XD, it ran from 2009 to 2012. As of now, it is unavailable on Disney+, except for Tarzan & Jane.

== Critical reception ==
Common Sense Media gave the show a rating of 3 stars out of 5, writing "Despite the show's charms, it doesn't quite live up to the original film. But it does teach viewers about the responsibilities of growing up — the good, the bad, and, of course, the funny — and it's definitely something that families can watch together, especially as it spends a lot of time focusing on family dynamics." The Hour praised the show for having Disney-quality animation, for being faithful to the film's storyline, and for giving viewers a chance to discover what happens after the movie ends. However, it noted the voice actors are not the same and said the voice of Terk is "really annoying".

In 2002, the show was nominated for a Daytime Emmy Award and two Golden Reel Awards.
