= Disney's Extreme Skate Adventure =

2003 video game

- Developers: Toys for Bob (PlayStation 2, GameCube, Xbox); Vicarious Visions (Game Boy Advance)
- Publisher: Activision
- Platforms: PlayStation 2; GameCube; Xbox; Game Boy Advance
- Release: NA: September 2, 2003; EU: September 5, 2003
- Genre: Sports
- Modes: Single-player, multiplayer

Disney's Extreme Skate Adventure is a 2003 skateboarding game developed by Toys for Bob for the PlayStation 2, GameCube, and Xbox, and Vicarious Visions for the Game Boy Advance, and published by Activision. The game features characters and stages licensed from Disney's The Lion King and Tarzan, and Pixar's Toy Story franchises.

Developed using the same engine and gameplay as Tony Hawk's Pro Skater 4 (2002), Disney's Extreme Skate Adventure was created as a licensed title to appeal to a younger audience, with the game featuring a simplified control scheme. Upon release, the game received generally positive reviews, with praise directed to the presentation and level design, and mixed reception to the simplified mechanics in contrast to the Tony Hawk series. The Game Boy Advance version received mixed reviews.

== Gameplay ==
A screenshot of gameplay in the console release of Extreme Skate Adventure.

Disney's Extreme Skate Adventure allows players to skate in stages inspired by Pixar's Toy Story and Disney's Tarzan and The Lion King, as well as two customizable featuring licensed characters and two child skaters, Ryan and Mallie Ann. The game features the same engine and gameplay mechanics as Tony Hawk's Pro Skater 4, with minor changes to simplify the control scheme, in which tricks and manuals are performed with the press of a single button and the performance of different tricks is differentiated by the type of obstacle. Players are able to revert to a more complex, combination-based control scheme by enabling 'Pro Controls' featured in the game's settings.

The game features several gameplay modes. In 'Adventure', players complete a series of levels by completing various challenges across levels, the completion of which unlocks new goals, levels, and clothing for customized skaters. In 'Free Skate', players are able to play all unlocked with available characters, with challenges disabled. The game supports multiplayer play in 'Versus', allowing players to complete various challenges including a one-on-one best trick contest, a best score challenge, and a 'king of the hill' mode in local split screen play.

The Game Boy Advance version of Disney's Extreme Skate Adventure features a reduced lineup of seven characters across six levels, with players similarly able to complete a 'Story Mode' to complete challenges across a series of levels, and three additional minigames, including a 'Time Challenge', 'Trick Challenge', and 'Turbo Challenge', where players must perform the specified tricks in the time allotted.

== Development and release ==
Disney's Extreme Skate Adventure was developed by Toys for Bob, a California based development studio contracted by parent company Activision to create a Disney-licensed extreme sports game. Development of Extreme Skate Adventure was based upon the RenderWare engine used by Activision subsidiary Neversoft to create Tony Hawk's Pro Skater 4, with minor additions added to the game to include "multi-stage tasks and more conversational interactions". CEO and Director Paul Reiche stated that production of Extreme Skate Adventure faced several challenges. Whilst described as a "perfect" relationship, development involved close input and approval from Disney and Pixar, with the developers cautious on where the studio could take "creative latitude" or "stick to the movies" in the game's visual design and animation. The developers also faced the challenge of making design decisions about where the studio should imitate its predecessors and "do what Tony did" or where it was appropriate to "step outside that framework", finding the simplification of the control scheme to a younger audience to be the "most difficult" part of the development process.

To market Disney's Extreme Skate Adventure, Activision launched a casting call for an 'Extreme Skate Crew' to seek ten child skaters to appear as playable characters in the game, with two of the winners, Ryan Fullerton Holleran and Mallie Ann Torres, voted by users to have their name featured in the game and appear in the opening cinematics. The soundtrack features licensed songs from artists including Reel Big Fish, Simple Plan, Smash Mouth, and Lil' Romeo, and the Xbox version allows players to load custom soundtracks. The game was released in North America on September 2, 2003, and in Europe on September 5.

== Reception ==
Reception

Aggregate score
Aggregator	Score			
Aggregator	GBA	GameCube	PS2	Xbox
Metacritic	70/100	76/100	78/100	76/100

Review scores
Publication	Score			
Publication	GBA	GameCube	PS2	Xbox
4Players	N/A	N/A	N/A	78%
Game Informer	6/10	8/10	7.75/10	7.75/10
Gamekult	N/A	6/10	6/10	6/10
GameSpot	6.3/10	7.3/10	7.3/10	7.3/10
GameZone	7.9/10	8.3/10	7.9/10	8.2/10
IGN	7.5/10	7.8/10	7.8/10	7.8/10
Jeuxvideo.com	12/20	15/20	15/20	15/20
Nintendo Power	3.4/5	3.8/5	N/A	N/A
Official U.S. PlayStation Magazine	N/A	N/A	4/5	N/A
Official Xbox Magazine (US)	N/A	N/A	N/A	8.2/10
TeamXbox	N/A	N/A	N/A	8/10

The console releases received "generally favorable reviews" according to the review aggregation website Metacritic. Reviewers were mixed on the merits of the game's simplified mechanics for a younger audience. Describing the title as "Tony Hawk for a younger audience", Kaiser Hwang of IGN noted "the number of moves has decreased, as has the difficulty", finding it to be a "watered-down experience". Michael Lafferty of GameZone similarly noted that the game "may be a bit too simplistic" for older players, citing the "scaled-down trickset and limited controls". In contrast, Jeff Gerstmann of GameSpot found the game to be challenging and enjoyable by "kids and adults alike", citing the increased difficulty of the game's challenges across levels.

Critics were mostly positive about the design of the stages. Gerstmann described the levels as "impressively large" and appropriately designed around the limitations of the reduced simpler trick set. Adam Pavlacka of PSM noted the level design was what "really makes (the game) shine", writing that the worlds were "true to the original film". Critics were also largely positive on the game's visual presentation. Although commending the game for "running smoothly (and) animating just as well", Hwang noted the game's "lack of defining or memorable effects". Describing the game as having a "good look to it", Gerstmann praised the game's "bright and colorful" presentation and "solid" animation. GamePro called the GameCube version "a good rental, but make sure you try it before you cough up the 40 bucks to buy it." (Note: GamePro gave the GameCube version 3/5 for graphics, 2/5 for sound, and two 3.5/5 scores for control and fun factor.)

The Game Boy Advance version received "mixed or average reviews" according to Metacritic. Frank Provo of GameSpot observed that the game's presentation was not "as realistic or technically ambitious" as its counterparts, noting that the environments were not "colorful or detailed enough".
