= Tarzan (video game) =

1999 video game

- North American PlayStation cover art
- Developers: Eurocom Entertainment Software (Microsoft Windows, PlayStation, Nintendo 64); Digital Eclipse (Game Boy Color)
- Publishers: PlayStation; Sony Computer Entertainment; Microsoft Windows; Disney Interactive; Nintendo 64/Game Boy Color; Activision
- Producers: Jon Williams (PlayStation, Microsoft Windows, Nintendo 64); Mat Sneap (PlayStation, Microsoft Windows, Nintendo 64); Troy Sheets (Game Boy Color)
- Composers: Steve Duckworth (PlayStation, Microsoft Windows, Nintendo 64); Bob Baffy (Game Boy Color)
- Series: Tarzan
- Platforms: Game Boy Color; PlayStation; Microsoft Windows; Nintendo 64
- Release: Game Boy Color: NA/EU: June 28, 1999; PlayStation: NA: June 30, 1999; EU: November 1, 1999; Microsoft Windows: NA: June 30, 1999; Nintendo 64: NA: February 15, 2000; EU: April 21, 2000
- Genre: Platform
- Mode: Single-player

Tarzan (also known as Disney's Action Game: Tarzan) is a 1999 platform video game developed by Eurocom Entertainment Software. Based on the 1999 film of the same name, it was released by Sony Computer Entertainment on the PlayStation and Disney Interactive on Microsoft Windows on June 30, 1999, and by Activision on Nintendo 64 in February 15, 2000. An abridged version for the Game Boy Color developed by Digital Eclipse was released in 1999.

== Plot ==
The player takes control of the eponymous Tarzan, an orphan child who was adopted and raised by gorillas. At the beginning of the game Tarzan is still a young kid who has to learn different skills from the gorillas such as climbing trees, swinging down branches or fighting small but aggressive wild animals. He eventually grows up to be a strong and skilled man who must defend himself and his fellow animal family's home, the jungle, from hunters led by the evil poacher Clayton.

== Gameplay ==
Disney's Tarzan is a 2.5D side-scrolling platform game, with gameplay taking place on a two-dimensional plane but with three-dimensional models and environments. The player controls the eponymous character of Tarzan, both as a child and as an adult, through 14 different levels. Along with running and jumping through levels, Tarzan is able to slam the ground in order to break open certain objects, as well as revealing hidden items and secret areas. Tarzan's main method of attacking enemies is by throwing assorted fruits, which can be thrown both overhand and underhand for varying throwing distances and come in 4 different levels of power marked by their colors. A knife can also be found in certain levels and used as a close-combat weapon, and certain other weapons, such as a spear and a parasol, are exclusively used in specific levels. Tarzan's health status is represented by a life bar that depletes as he is harmed by enemies and other hazards. The health bar can be refilled by collecting bananas, which are hidden in banana trees and other areas throughout levels.

Levels feature several different collectible items, such as coins that earn the player an extra life when 100 of them are collected, and four pieces of a pencil sketch which are hidden throughout the level and unlock a bonus level when collected. Scenes from the game's respective film can be unlocked by locating 6 letters (T-A-R-Z-A-N) in each level.

The game has three difficulty levels: easy, medium and hard. In the easy and medium difficulties, little Tarzan gets tips from his friend Terk. Tarzan's enemies are monkeys, baboons, eagles, Sabor the leopard, and different animals such as snakes and bushpigs, and some humans such as Clayton.

== Development ==
The Game Boy Color version of Disney's Tarzan was developed by Digital Eclipse, who had previously developed several ports of older games including Klax, Joust and Paperboy. It was Digital Eclipse's first completely original video game which they had developed and designed from scratch, as their previous efforts had all been ports of other games. The game's development team was given 3 months to develop the game, and consisted of two programmers, ten artists and three level designers. According to the game's technical director, Mike Mika, the initial design concept for the game was "quite ambitious", with several gameplay mechanics needing to be nixed due to time constraints. According to Mika, the team wanted to include gameplay objectives which were given to the player by talking to and interacting with non-playable characters, and had concepts for several mechanics which went unincorporated, such as levels which involved riding on top of birds and levels that featured Tantor the elephant as a playable character.

== Reception ==
Reception

Aggregate score
Aggregator	Score			
Aggregator	GBC	N64	PC	PS
GameRankings	74%	71.11%	82%	71.11%

Review scores
Publication	Score			
Publication	GBC	N64	PC	PS
AllGame	4/5	3.5/5	4.5/5	4/5
Electronic Gaming Monthly	N/A	6.5/10	N/A	6.25/10
Game Informer	6.5/10	7.25/10	N/A	7.75/10
GameFan	N/A	91%	N/A	N/A
GameRevolution	N/A	N/A	N/A	C−
GameSpot	N/A	6.9/10	N/A	7.8/10
IGN	8/10	7.8/10	7.3/10	7.7/10
Next Generation	N/A	3/5	N/A	2/5
Nintendo Power	7.4/10	8.5/10	N/A	N/A
Official U.S. PlayStation Magazine	N/A	N/A	N/A	3.5/5
PC Gamer (US)	N/A	N/A	73%	N/A
The Cincinnati Enquirer	N/A	N/A	N/A	3/4

Disney's Tarzan received positive reviews upon its release, with critics praising the game's graphics and its faithfulness towards the film's story.

Rick Sanchez reviewed the PlayStation version of the game for Next Generation, rating it two stars out of five, and stated that "Tarzan is a solid, if uninspired, title that gets by mostly on its looks. Serious gamers won't find much of value, but it might appeal to the kiddie set flocking to the film".

Rick Sanchez reviewed the Nintendo 64 version of the game for Next Generation, rating it three stars out of five, and wrote that "Disney Interactive borrowed the best platform gaming tricks and put them together in one package. While there's nothing new or original in Disney's Tarzan, it is still a decent game".

Janice Tong from The Sydney Morning Herald gave the game three stars out of five, stating: "If you have no compunction about slaughtering Disney-cute beasties, this is the game for you".

The PlayStation version of Disney's Tarzan received a "Gold" sales award from the Entertainment and Leisure Software Publishers Association (ELSPA), indicating sales of at least 200,000 copies in the United Kingdom. The Walt Disney Company's annual report of 1999 listed the combined sales of Tarzan and A Bug's Life as having sold more than 2.8 million units worldwide.
