= Nightwood Theatre =

Canadian professional women's theatre

- Formation: 1979
- Type: Theatre group
- Location: Toronto, Canada
- Artistic directors: Cynthia Grant (until 1985); Mary Vingoe (1985–1987); Maureen White (1987–1988); Kate Lushington (1988–1993); Alisa Palmer and Diane Roberts(1993–1995); Alisa Palmer (1995–2001); Kelly Thornton (2001–2019); Andrea Donaldson (2019–pres.)
- Website: www.nightwoodtheatre.net

Nightwood Theatre is Canada's oldest professional women's theatre and is based in Toronto. It was founded in 1979 by Cynthia Grant, Kim Renders, Mary Vingoe, and Maureen White and was originally a collective. Though it was not the founders' original intention, Nightwood Theatre has become known for producing feminist works. Some of Nightwood's most famous productions include This is For You, Anna (1983) and Good Night Desdemona (Good Morning Juliet) (1988). Nightwood hosts several annual events including FemCab, the Hysteria Festival, and Groundswell Festival which features readings from participants of Nightwood's Write from the Hip playwright development program.

== Company history ==
Nightwood Theatre was launched in 1979 by co-founders Cynthia Grant, Kim Renders, Mary Vingoe and Maureen White. The name Nightwood was inspired by Djuna Barnes’ novel Nightwood. Nightwood was originally intended to be a collective. The company was not originally intended to be a feminist theatre company, but became so by reputation. Nightwood Theatre is part of what Denis Johnston refers to as the "third-wave" of small theatres in Toronto, encapsulating companies which emerged from the late 1970s to the early 1980s during the end of second-wave feminism.

In the beginning, Nightwood focussed largely on collective creations. Their first production in 1979, The True Story of Ida Johnson, was adapted from the novel by Sharon Riis, and is described as "an innovative mixed-media performance". Grant, who had worked in an editing group at the Women's Press to publish the novel, organized a dramatic reading of The True Story of Ida Johnson in 1977 and there was a workshop production in 1978 featuring Renders, Vingoe and White in addition to Grant herself. The official Nightwood production opened in September 1979.

In 1979, Nightwood, along with Buddies in Bad Times, launched the Rhubarb! Festival, originally intended to be a festival of new Canadian works. Nightwood co-presented the 1980, 1981, and 1982 Rhubarb! Festivals until Rhubarb! became a strictly Buddies in Bad Times production in 1983. The founding artistic director of Buddies in Bad Times, Sky Gilbert, found that Nightwood's involvement in Rhubarb! shifted the emphasis of the festival towards conceptual pieces and away from scripts.

Nightwood did not develop a formal administrative structure until the 1982, when a small board of directors was formed. It was around this time that the company began consistently referring to, if albeit informally, Cynthia Grant as Nightwood's artistic director. Until this point, Nightwood's founding four members, Grant, Renders, Vingoe, and White, shared leadership roles and frequently interchanged titles and responsibilities.

As part of their 1982–83 season, Nightwood produced the inaugural FemCab, or "Five Minute Feminist Cabaret" on March 8, 1983 at the Horseshoe Tavern. Early FemCab participants included Ann-Marie MacDonald, The Clichettes, Holly Cole, and Meryn Caddell. FemCab was originally produced with Women's Cultural Building, a Toronto-based women's collective who looked to establish a building for women's groups, but, in 1990, it became an annual fundraising event solely for Nightwood. FemCab was briefly suspended for two years from 1995 to 1996.

Initially, Grant, Renders, Vingoe, and White tried to avoid Nightwood being labelled "women's theatre" but were labelled as such by the press. In a 1984 grant application, Mary Vingoe implicitly identified Nightwood Theatre with the feminist movement by stating that Nightwood's 1984–85 season was designed around and to address the issues raised in Rina Fraticelli's report on the status of women in Canadian theatre. In the same funding application, Vingoe noted that Nightwood's work dealt with "the concerns of the women's community" among other issues. Nightwood did not, however, explicitly define themselves as feminist theatre or use the words 'feminist' or 'feminism' in official self-description until much later.

Work on the collective creation, This is for You, Anna, began in 1983. The play was created by a group of artists, many of whom had worked with Nightwood before, who called themselves the Anna Collective. The collective consisted of Suzanne Khuri, Ann-Marie MacDonald, Baņuta Rubess, Aida Jordão, Patricia Nichol, and Nightwood co-founder Maureen White. This is for You, Anna was inspired by the story of Marianne Bachmeier, a woman who shot the man accused of killing her daughter, and premiered as part of Nightwood's 1985–86 season.

In 1985, Grant and several other founding members left Nightwood. The same year, Vingoe was appointed Nightwood's 'artistic coordinator', fulfilling the same responsibilities of an artistic director. Vingoe said the change in title was to "allow[] more 'collective' input on major decisions". White took over this position in 1987. In 1988, Kate Lushington became artistic coordinator and Lynda Hill became associate artistic coordinator. In 1990, Lushington reverted the title of Artistic Coordinator to artistic director.

Nightwood Theatre's breakthrough play was Ann-Marie MacDonald's Good Night Desdemona (Good Morning Juliet). The play premiered with Nightwood in 1988 as directed by Baņuta Rubess and was remounted in 1990. The play was the winner of Floyd S. Chalmers Canadian Play Award and Governor General's Award, and the production as a whole was nominated for several Dora Mavor Moore awards.

In 1991, Diane Roberts was appointed associate artistic director. Then in 1993, Alisa Palmer and Diane Roberts were appointed co-artistic directors. Palmer was appointed the sole incoming artistic director in 1995. Kelly Thornton was appointed artistic director of Nightwood Theatre in 2001, the same year Nightwood launched their play development program, Write from the Hip.

In 2002, Nightwood moved their offices from the Theatre Centre to the Toronto's Distilleries district, where they still are today. The next year, Nightwood launched Hysteria: A Festival of Women with Buddies in Bad Times. The Hysteria Festival was intended to be a semi-annual and multi-disciplinary showcase of North American female artists. The 2003 Hysteria Festival was ten days long and featured classes and workshops in addition to performances and staged readings.

Nightwood Theatre held the Consent Event in 2017, coinciding with widespread conversations around the #MeToo movement following allegations of sexual abuse against Harvey Weinstein. The event featured the premieres of two plays and the Consent Event Symposium, a community conversation and workshop about consent. The plays premiered as part of the Consent Event were Rose Napoli's Lo (or Dear Mr. Wells), which Napoli developed when she was a participant in Write from the Hip, and Ellie Moon's documentary-play, Asking for It.

In early 2019, it was announced that Andrea Donaldson would be taking over Thornton's role of artistic director. Donaldson's first programmed season will be 2020–21, though she officially began transitioning into the new role in March 2019.

Nightwood Theatre cancelled their performances of Karen Hines' All the Little Animals I Have Eaten in keeping with Canada's guidelines surrounding the COVID-19 outbreak.

In December 2021, the company was informed by the owner of the building owner that it had until August 2022 to leave it's space in the Distillery district. In March 2025 they reopened a new joint space with Tapestry Opera in the Nancy and Ed Jackman Performance Centre, 877 Yonge Street. The new 6,500 square foot venue contains a rehearsal studio and a 200 seat performance facility.

== Groundswell Festival ==
Nightwood Theatre's Groundswell Festival of new works began in the spring of 1986 and was originally timed to coincide with International Women's Day.

In 2011, Nightwood Theatre held two Groundswell Festivals, the latter of which was called The New Groundswell Festival. In a brochure published by Nightwood for the 2011 New Groundswell Festival, they wrote that "Nightwood has re-envisioned and expanded Groundswell to be A National Festival of Contemporary Women's Theatre." Since the second Groundswell of 2011, the festival has operated under the new name.

Many plays which have premiered or been workshopped at Groundswell have gone on to be performed as part of Nightwood Theatre's main season.

=== Write from the Hip ===
Write from the Hip or WFTH, as it is sometimes called, is Nightwood's script development program for emerging playwrights and began in 2001. Originally, Write from the Hip culminated with playwrights writing 15-minute plays, but former artistic director Kelly Thornton felt that this format did not encourage the participation of playwrights who were committed to theatre. During these early years, Write from the Hip plays were performed by actors from Nightwood's Emerging Actors Program. In the beginning, Write from the Hip was aimed at playwrights aged 19 to 29, but it is now open to participants of any age who fit Nightwood's description of "emerging playwright".

Write from the Hip pieces are now featured as readings as part of the Groundswell Festival. Andrea Donaldson was Write from the Hip program director from 2014 to 2019. Donna-Michell St. Bernard replaced Donaldson as the Write from the Hip program director for the 2019–20 season. The position has previously been held by Lisa Codrington and Anna Chatterton.

== Artistic directors ==
- Cynthia Grant (founding artistic director, until 1985)
- Mary Vingoe (1985–1987), as artistic coordinator
- Maureen White (1987–1988), as artistic coordinator
- Kate Lushington (1988–1993), as artistic coordinator (1988–1990)
- Alisa Palmer and Diane Roberts (1993–1995)
- Alisa Palmer (1995–2001)
- Kelly Thornton (2001–2019)
- Andrea Donaldson (2019–pres.)

== Select performance history ==
- The True Story of Ida Johnson— a collaborative adaptation of the novel by Sharon Riis (1979)
- The Yellow Wallpaper — adapted from Charlotte Perkins Gilman's story The Yellow Wallpaper (1980-81 season)
- Antigone — adapted from Sophocles' Greek tragedy Antigone by Patricia Keeney-Smith (1982-83 season)
- Pope Joan — written by Baņuta Rubess, directed by Cynthia Grant, finalist for the Floyd S. Chalmers Canadian Play Award (1983-84 season)
- Love and Work Enough – "A Celebration of Ontario's Pioneer Women" — won Dora Mavor Moore Award for Best Production in children's category (1983-84 season)
- La Musica – "an interlude in divorce" — written by Marguerite Duras (1983-84 season)
- Re-production — written by Amanda Hale (1984-85 season)
- The Edge of the Earth is Too Near, Violette Leduc — written by Jovette Marchessault (1984-85 season)
- This is For You, Anna — created by Suzanne Khuri, Ann-Marie MacDonald, Baņuta Rubess, Maureen White, Aida Jordao and Patricia Nichol (1985-86 season)
- My Boyfriend's Back and There's Gonna Be Laundry — written and performed by Sandra Shamas (1986-87 season)
- Goodnight Desdemona (Good Morning Juliet) — written by Ann-Marie MacDonald, winner of Floyd S. Chalmers Canadian Play Award and Governor General's Award, nominated for Dora Mavor Moore awards (1987-88 season, later toured as part of 1989–90 season)
- Princess Pocahontas and the Blue Spots — written by Monique Mojica (1989-90 season)
- A Fertile Imagination — written by Susan G. Cole, directed by Kate Lushington (1990-91 season)
- dark diaspora . . . in DUB — written by Ahdri Zhina Mandiela, directed by Mandiela and Djanet Sears (1990-91 season)
- The Wonder Quartet — written by Diana Braithwaite (1991-92 season)
- Love and Other Strange Things — written by Lilian Allen (1992-93 season)
- Oedipus — written by Ned Dickens (1993-94 season)
- Wearing the Bone — written by Alisa Palmer (1993-94 season)
- Harlem Duet — written and directed by Djanet Sears (1996-97 season)
- The Striker — written by Caryl Churchill, workshop production (1997-98 season)
- Random Acts — written by Diane Flacks (1997-98 season, followed by tour)
- One Flea Spare — written by Naomi Wallace (1998-99 season)
- Smudge — written by Alex Bulmer (1999-2000 season, followed by tour)
- Anything That Moves — written by Ann-Marie MacDonald (lyrics and book), Alisa Palmer (book), and Allen Cole (music) (1999-2000 and 2000–01 seasons)
- The Adventures of a Black Girl in Search of God — written and directed by Djanet Sears (2001-02 season)
- The Danish Play — written by Sonja Mills (2002-03 season, 2004-05 tours as far as Denmark, remounted at Nightwood for 2006–07 season)
- Cast Iron — written by Lisa Codrington (2004-05 season)
- Mathilde — written by Véronique Olmi and translated by Morwyn Brebner (2005-06 season)
- Bear With Me — written by and starring Diane Flacks (2005-06 season, remounted for 2008–09 season)
- Crave — written by Sarah Kane (2006-07 season)
- Age of Arousal — written by Linda Griffiths (2007-08 season)
- Wild Dogs — written for the stage by Anne Hardcastle, adapted from the novel by Helen Humphreys (2008-09 season)
- Yellowman — written by Dael Orlandersmith (2009-10 season)
- That Face — written by Polly Stenham (2009-10 season)
- Ruined — written by Lynn Nottage and directed by Philip Akin (2010-11 season)
- The List — written by Jennifer Tremblay and translated by Shelley Tepperman (2010-11 season)
- Stockholm — written by Bryony Lavery (2011-12 season)
- The Penelopiad — written by Margaret Atwood (2011–12 and 2012–13 seasons)
- The Carousel — written by Jennifer Tremblay and translated by Shelley Tepperman (2013-14 season)
- Free Outgoing — written by Anupama Chandrasekhar (2013-14 season)
- Nirbhaya — written and directed by Yaël Farber (2015-16 season)
- The Public Servant — written by Jennifer Brewin, Haley McGee, Sarah McVie and Amy Rutherford (2015-16 season)
- Refuge — written by Mary Vingoe (2015-16 season)
- Quiver — written and performed by Anna Chatterton (2016-17 season)
- Mouthpiece — created and performed by Amy Nostbakken and Norah Sadava (2016-17 season, re-mounted for 2017/18 season)
- Unholy — written and performed by Diane Flacks (2016-17 season, re-staged for 2018–19 season)
- Asking For It — written by Ellie Moon (2017-18 season)
- Lo (or Dear Mr. Wells) — written by Rose Napoli (2017-18 season)
- 7th Cousins — written and performed by Christine Brubaker and Erin Brubacher (2017-18 season)
- Inner Elder — written by Michelle Thrush (2018-19 season)
- School Girls; Or, the African Mean Girls Play — written by Jocelyn Bioh (2018-19 season)
- All the Little Animals I Have Eaten — written and directed by Karen Hines (2019-20 season, cancelled due to COVID-19)

== Notable performers ==
- Megan Follows
- Sky Gilbert - nominated for Dora Mavor Moore Award for Featured Male Performance for performance in The Edge of the Earth is Too Near, Violette Leduc
- Kate Hennig - won a Dora Mavor Moore Award for Outstanding Performance by a Female in a Principal Role – Play (Large Theatre) in The Danish Play (2003)
- Christine Horne
