= Black Theatre Workshop =

Black Theater Workshop (BTW) is a non-profit theater company headquartered in Montreal. It is one of the most enduring Black English-speaking professional theater companies in Canada. It was founded by Clarence Bayne and Arthur Goddard, who were also instrumental in establishing the Trinidad and Tobago association. Over the years, the Black Theater Workshop has been renowned for its collaboration with numerous accomplished artistic directors.

== History ==
Black Theater Workshop was officially established in February 1970 and subsequently incorporated as a non-profit organization in 1971, tracing its origins back to the Drama Committee of the Trinidad and Tobago Association. This committee, spearheaded by individuals such as Clarence Bayne and Arthur Goddard, founders of the Trinidad and Tobago Association, drafted the organization's initial Constitution and by-laws. In the late 1960s, Bayne and other Trinidadian students at McGill University and Sir George Williams University invited black professional artists from Montreal to conduct workshops as part of the Drama Committee's activities.

BTW's inaugural professional production, How Now Black Man by Lorris Elliott, a professor at McGill University, was brought to life through the collaboration of the Trinidad and Tobago Association. Dr. Bayne, acting as the Executive Producer and representative of the Association's interests, oversaw this production, except for a brief hiatus from the company between 1970 and 1972. From 1973–4 to 1990, Dr. Bayne served as both the Executive Producer and President during the formative years of the company. During his tenure, he successfully secured the initial professional grant from the Canada Council, alongside matching funds from the Multicultural Directorate in Ottawa. This achievement in 1984 marked the transformation of the company into a professional theater company, rendering it eligible for funding from all three tiers of cultural funding agencies. Black Theatre Workshop primarily operates in the English language. The company's first play, "How Now Black Man," premiered in 1970 under the name Black Workshop at the Centaur Theatre, although Black Theatre Workshop de facto originated on July 17, 1968.

Throughout its history, the theater has been led by numerous artistic directors, including Dr. Clarence Bayne, Errol Sitahal, Terry Donald, Dwight Bacquie, Lorena Gale, Don Jordan, Winston Sutton, Fleurette Fernando, Nancy Delva, Kate Bligh, Rachael Van Fossen, and Tyrone Benskin. Since August 2011, Quincy Armorer has assumed the role of artistic director. Armorer, a graduate of Concordia University's Theatre Department, further honed his craft at the Birmingham Conservatory for Classical Theatre at the Stratford Festival.

== Awards and merits ==
- Walter Borden, (Tightrope Time: Ain’t Nuthin’ More Than Some Itty Bitty Madness Between Twilight and Dawn), one of the first plays in the history of Black Canadian literature to directly present themes of male homosexuality.
- Djanet Sears (The Adventures of a Black Girl in Search of God, Afrika Solo, Harlem Duet).
- Some emerging playwrights as well including Omari Newton (Sal Capone: The Lamentable Tragedy of), Anne-Marie Woods (She Said/He Said), Chimwemwe Miller (When Elephant was King) Djennie Laguerre (Rendez-Vous with Home).

== Gallery ==
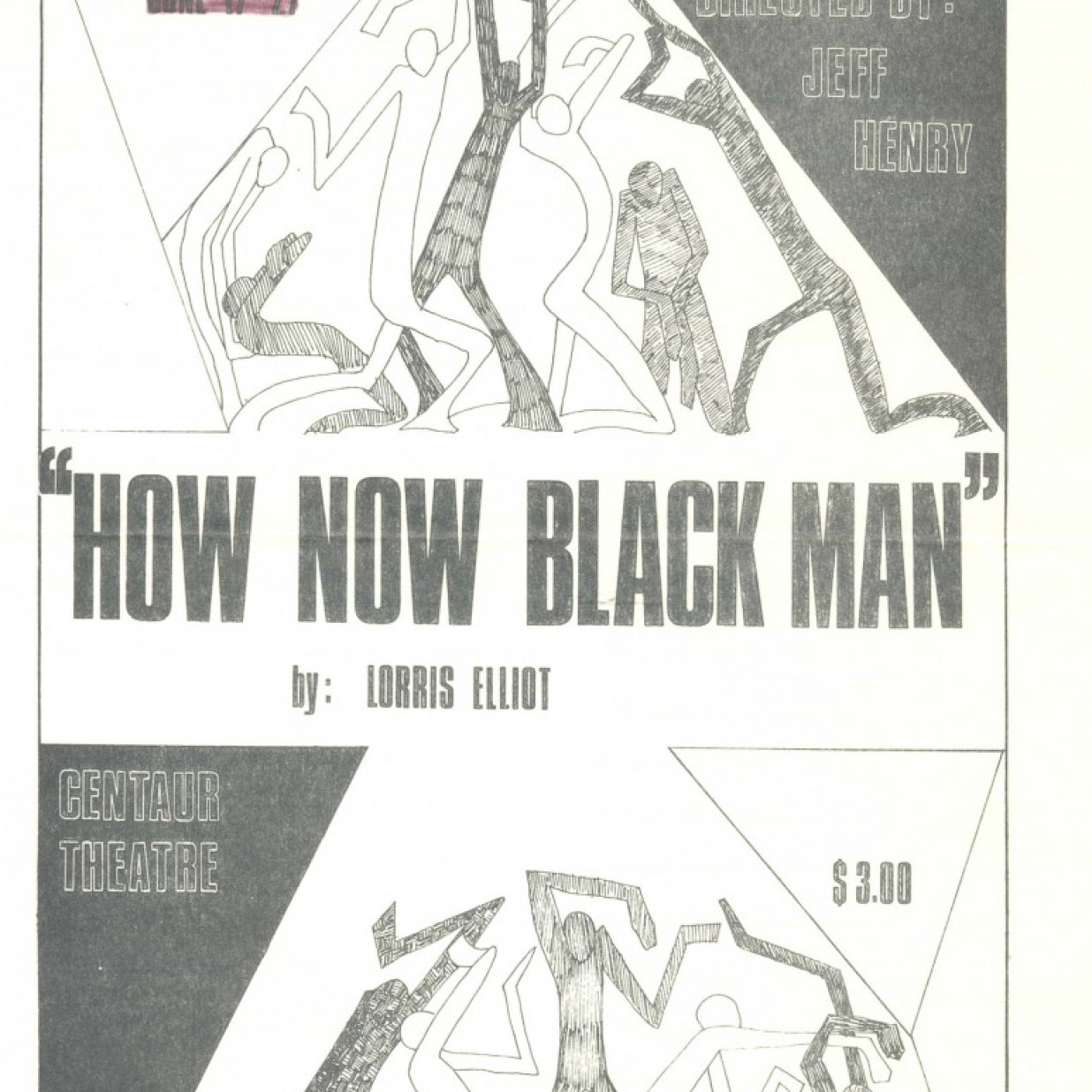
How Now Black Man

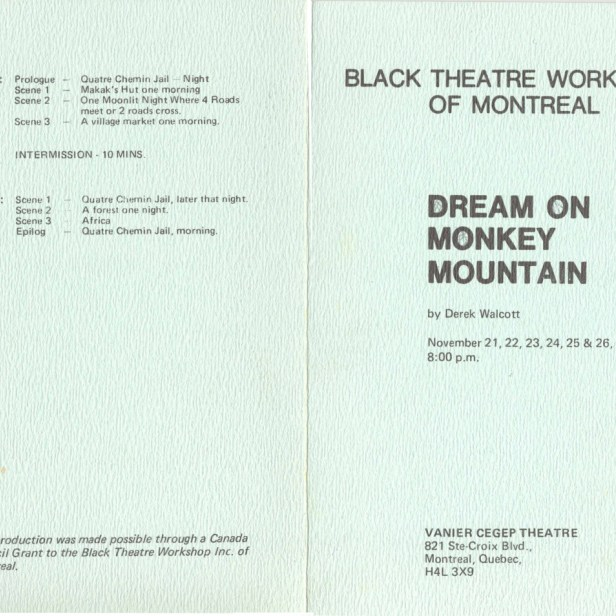
Dream on Monkey Mountain

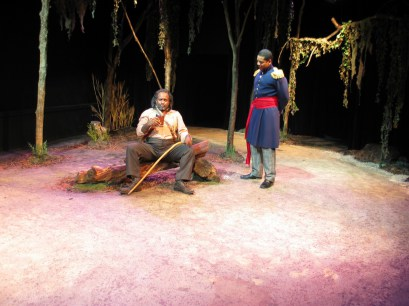
Wade in the Water

== Dr. Martin Luther King Jr. Achievement Award ==
Since 1986, the theatre has given out the annual Dr. Martin Luther King Jr. Achievement Award, presented to an individual who has made a significant contribution to African-Canadian artistic and cultural life in Canada. BTW presents the gala each year to celebrate the contributions of Dr. Martin Luther King to non-violent social change.

BTW presents an award for lifetime achievement. Recipients include: Recipients of the Dr. Martin Luther King Jr. Achievement Award – In 1987, the 1st Vision Celebration Gala was given to Oscar Peterson: Music. In 1988, Ranee Lee: Music / Actor [Jazz]. 1989, Charlie Biddle: Music [Jazz]. 1990, Rufus Rockhead (posthumously): Music [Jazz]. 1991, Dr. Dorothy Wills: Community / Arts. 1992, Dr. Clarence Bayne: Theatre & Educator. 1993, Oliver Jones: Music [Pianist]. 1994, Professor Trevor Payne: Music. 1995, Dr. Daisy Peterson Sweeney: Music. 1996, Salome Bey: Music / Actor. 1997, Lorraine Klaasen: Music [Singer]. 1998, Anthony Sherwood: Actor. 1999, Austin Clarke: Writer. 2000, Michelle Sweeney: Music [Singer]. 2001, Aldwin Albino: Music. 2002, Anthony Salah I. Wilson: Music [Steel pan]. 2003, Djanet Sears: Theatre. 2004, George Elliot Clarke: Poet. 2005, Jeri Brown: Music [Jazz]. 2006, Walter Borden: Theatre. 2007, Charles Ellison: Music [Jazz]. 2008, Terry Donald: Theatre. 2009, Ethel Bruneau: Dance [Tap]. 2010, Bertrand A. Henry: Theatre. 2011, Doudou Boicel: Music. 2012, Tonya Lee Williams: Film & Television. 2013, Gregory Charles: Music. 2014. Zab Maboungou: Dance. 2015, Dany Laferrière: Literature. 2016, Jackie Richardson: Theatre & Music. 2017, Winston Sutton: Theatre, Don Jordan: Dance & Theatre, 2018.

In 2005, BTW was recognized by the Dr. Martin Luther King Jr. Legacy Committee of Montreal for its Historic Contribution to the Development of Black Performing Arts in Canada. It has also received a Trail Blazer Award (Black History Month Round Table Award).
