= Diane Roberts (director) =

English theatre artist

- Born: Surrey, England, UK
- Education: York University (BA and MFA); Concordia University (PhD)
- Occupation: Interdisciplinary theatre artist
- Known for: Founder of Arrivals Legacy Project; Founding member of Obsidian Theatre; Former artistic director of Nightwood Theatre

Diane Roberts is an interdisciplinary theatre creator. Roberts was a founding member of Obsidian Theatre. Roberts was an artistic co-director of Nightwood Theatre, the artistic director of Urban Ink Productions, and a co-founder and artistic director of Boldskool Productions. She is the creator of the Arrivals Legacy Project.

== Education ==
Roberts obtained her BA in theatre in 1988 at York University. In 1998, she also obtained an MFA in Playmaking also at York. Roberts is currently pursuing a PhD in the Fine Arts Interdisciplinary HUMA program at Concordia University. Her PhD research centres "on the praxis of embodied decolonisation in contemporary performance". Roberts is a 2019 Pierre Elliott Trudeau Scholar.

== Career ==
Roberts became involved with Nightwood Theatre when Kate Lushington was hired as Nightwood's artistic associate in 1988. Lushington and Roberts worked together to make Nightwood's mandate explicitly anti-racist and to create initiatives to be more inclusive of women of colour. In October 1992, Roberts became Nightwood's associate artistic director. In 1994, she was named artistic co-director of Nightwood with Alisa Palmer. Roberts, Palmer, and producer Leslie Lester served as a three-person leadership team but shared two salaries. While working with Nightwood Theatre, Roberts directed several productions including Karen Kemlo's Clean (1992), Pauline Peters' Dryland: A Story Cycle (1993), Dilara Ally's Mango Chutney (1994, 1995, and 1996), Cathy Lenihan's Death and Renovation (1994), Marium Carvell's Dinah Blues of the Queen (1995), and The Coloured Girls Project (1995). The Coloured Girls Project was initiated by Roberts and became an in-house workshop. Roberts left Nightwood in Spring 1996.

In 1997, Roberts directed Joan MacLeod's Little Sister. She was nominated for a Dora Mavor Moore Award for Outstanding Direction (mid-size theatre) for her work on that production.

In 2000, Roberts co-founded Obsidian Theatre with Awovieyi Agie, Philip Akin, Ardon Bess, David Collins, Roy Lewis, Yanna McIntosh, Kim Roberts, Sandi Ross, Djanet Sears, Satori Shakoor, Tricia Williams, and Alison Sealy-Smith. Obsidian was founded as a theatre centring Black voices in Canada with an emphasis on producing plays and developing new voices and works.

In 2004, Roberts founded The Arrivals Legacy Project during an artistic residency at Concordia. The project aims to bring together racialized artists in collective collaboration and examination of ancestry and cultural practices.

From 2007 to 2014, Roberts was the artistic director of Urban Ink Productions. With Urban Ink Productions, Roberts directed many shows including Valerie Sing Turner's Confessions of the Other Woman in 2012 (co-directed with Gerry Trentham) and Omari Newton's Sal Capone: The Lamentable Tragedy Of in 2014. After working with Newton on Sal Capone, Roberts and Newton co-founded Boldskool Productions, a hip hop theatre company. She is Boldskool Productions' artistic director. In 2018, Boldskool restaged Sal Capone once again under Roberts' direction and presented with the NAC English Theatre.

Roberts has taught theatre at York University and Concordia University.

== Plays ==
- Bone Bred

== Personal life ==
Roberts currently lives in Montreal, QC. She is of Garifuna, Scottish, French, Indian, African, and Caribbean ancestry.
