= Kelly Thornton (director) =

Canadian theatre director and dramaturge (born 1965)

- Born: 1965 (age 60–61); Brockville, Ontario
- Education: University of Guelph
- Occupation: Director
- Years active: 1994-present

Kelly Thornton (born 1965) is a Canadian theatre director and dramaturge. She has served as artistic director of Nightwood Theatre and is the current artistic director of the Royal Manitoba Theatre Centre. Thornton was the co-head of Equity in Canadian Theatre: the Women's Initiative.

== Early life ==
Thornton was born in Brockville, Ontario in 1965 and was the youngest of four children. At age nine, she moved with her family to Melbourne, Australia, but returned to Canada six years later.

Thornton began university at the University of Western Ontario, where she considered studying psychology before changing her focus to English and philosophy. Thornton transferred University of Guelph where she double-majored in theatre and English. She graduated in 1994.

== Career ==
In 1998, Thornton directed This Hotel starring her then husband, Alex Poch-Goldin. She directed This Hotel again in 2001 with Theatre Passe Muraille at the Toronto Fringe Festival. Thornton was nominated for a Dora Mavor Moore Award for her direction of the 2001 production.

In April 2000, Thornton became the artistic director of the Rhubarb! Festival in Toronto. She held this position for the 2000 and 2001 festivals.

Thornton was appointed artistic director of Nightwood Theatre in 2001. One of her first productions with the company was Djanet Sears' The Adventures of a Black Girl in Search of God. Adventures of a Black Girl was performed in 2001 with a budget Thornton has described as being larger than the entire seasonal operations budget of Nightwood at the time.

Thornton was heavily involved in launching Equity in Canadian Theatre: the Women's Initiative with the Playwrights Guild of Canada and the Professional Association of Canadian Theatres. Equity in Canadian Theatre focussed on addressing the gender imbalance in leadership positions in Canadian theatre. Thornton served as co-head of the initiative.

While Thornton was Nightwood's artistic director, she directed several productions including Véronique Olmi's Mathilde (2006, translated by Morwyn Brebne), Polly Stenham's That Face (2009), Jennifer Tremblay's The List (2010), Margaret Atwood's The Penelopiad (2012), Anupama Chandrasekhar's Free Outgoing (2014), and Mary Vingoe's Refuge (2016).

In 2019, Thornton left Nightwood to become the artistic director of the Royal Manitoba Theatre Centre. Thornton is the first female artistic director of the RMTC. In the fall of 2019, Thornton directed Kat Sandler's play Bang Bang with RMTC, marking her Winnipeg directorial debut. As part of her tenure as artistic director, Thornton created RMTC's Bridge Festival. The Bridge was created to supplant the RMTC's Master Playwright Festival and was supposed to launch in 2020. However, due to COVID-19, the Bridge launched in 2021 with the theme Art and (re)Conciliation.

Thornton's inaugural season (2020/21) as artistic director was set to include the Canadian premiere of Network and a production of The Sound of Music, the latter of which she was to direct. In June 2020, Thornton announced a "reimagined season", which included cancellations of Network and The Sound of Music, due to COVID-19 restrictions. Thornton directed Sarah Ruhl's adaptation of Orlando in late 2021 as the RMTC's first in-person production in the pandemic.

== Personal life ==
Thornton was previously married to actor Alex Poch-Goldin. The two have a daughter named Chloe. Thornton is currently married to Josep Seras.

== Awards ==
Year	Award	Category	Work	Result	Notes	Ref.
1997	Alumnae Theatre Director's Award (University of Toronto)		The Visit	Won		
2002	Dora Mavor Moore Awards	Outstanding Direction of a Play/Musical	This Hotel	Nominated		
2003	Pauline McGibbon Award	Director	N/A	Won		
2004	Harold Awards	House of Don McKellar	N/A	Won		
2008	Toronto YWCA Women of Distinction	Arts and Letters	N/A	Won		
2010	Siminovitch Prize	Director		Nominated		
2012	Dora Mavor Moore Awards	Outstanding Direction of a Play/Musical	The Penelopiad	Nominated		
