= Kate Lushington =

Canadian theatre artist and teacher

- Education: Concordia University; York University
- Occupations: Playwright; Theatre director; Teacher
- Known for: Nightwood Theatre
- Children: 3
- Website: www.katelushington.com

Kate Lushington is a Canadian theatre artist and teacher. From 1988 to 1993, Lushington was the artistic director of Nightwood Theatre. Lushington has worked with The Clichettes and is the writer of The Apocalypse Plays: A Legacy Project.

== Early life ==
Lushington studied design at Concordia University and later design and production at York University.

== Career ==
In the early seventies, Lushington taught at the Royal Academy of Dramatic Art (RADA) in London.

In 1987, Lushington's play Let's Go to Your Place, which she co-created with The Clichettes premiered at Nightwood Theatre's 3rd Groundswell Festival. Lushington's play Sex in a Box also premiered at the 1987 Groundswell Festival. In 1988, Lushington's collaboration with The Clichettes, Up Against The Wallpaper premiered under the direction of Maureen White.

In 1988, Lushington was hired as Nightwood Theatre's artistic associate. At the time, the artistic associate position fulfilled the same responsibilities as an artistic director, but the difference in title reflected Nightwood's structure as a creative collective. In 1990, Lushington reverted the title of her position to artistic director. Lushington was the first artistic director/coordinator of Nightwood that was not a founding member of the collective. While working for Nightwood, Lushington directed several shows including Susan G. Cole's A Fertile Imagination (1991), Kelley Jo Burke's Charming and Rose: True Love (1993), and Lillian Allen's Love & Other Strange Things (1993). Lushington also co-dramaturged Monique Mojica's Princess Pocahontas and the Blue Spots in 1989 with Djanet Sears. In 1994, Alisa Palmer and Diane Roberts took over from Lushington as co-artistic directors of Nightwood Theatre.

In 1999, Lushington's short film, "Subway Transfer" premiered at the On The Fly Festival in Toronto. The film was awarded the Mouche D'Or and the $4,000 cash prize associated with it.

In 2007, Lushington directed the controversial play My Name Is Rachel Corrie for Theatre PANIK in Toronto. In 2011, Lushington directed Morning Glory, Karen Bolette Sonne's play about female prisoners with special needs.

Lushington began teaching speaking skills at the Injured Workers Speakers School in Toronto in 2007. There, Lushington used traditional theatre techniques to teach the history of worker's compensation. Lushington currently teaches Alexander Technique from her studio.

== Personal life ==
Lushington was married to interdisciplinary theatre artist Richard Greenblatt. The two met in London while Lushington was teaching at RADA. They have three children: Natasha, William, and Luke.

== Bibliography ==
=== Plays ===
Works co-created with The Clichettes

- Let's Go to Your Place
- Up Against the Wallpaper

The Apocalypse Plays: A Legacy Project

- Grief Kit
- Sex in a Box
- Bundle of Joy - co-written with Natasha Greenblatt

=== Non-Fiction ===
- "Fear of Feminism" in Feminist Theatre and Performance (ed. Susan Bennett, 2006)
