= Andrea Donaldson =

Canadian theatre director and dramaturge

- Born: Toronto, Ontario
- Education: Simon Fraser University
- Occupation: Artistic director

Andrea Donaldson is a Canadian theatre director and dramaturge. She is the current artistic director of Nightwood Theatre and was formerly the program director of Nightwood's Write From the Hip program.

== Early life ==
Donaldson attended the Claude Watson School for the Arts for high school. She later attended the School for Contemporary Arts at Simon Fraser University and graduated with a BFA in theatre.

== Career ==
From 2012 to 2016, Donaldson was the assistant/associate artistic director of Tarragon Theatre. Donaldson has directed several plays with Tarragon including Anna Chatterton's Within The Glass (2016) and Arun Lakra's Sequence (2017).

Donaldson participated in the Stratford Festival's Michael Langham Workshop for classical direction in 2012 and 2013. As part of the program, she assistant directed The Matchmaker and Othello. For her work at Stratford, Donaldson was awarded the Jean Gascon Award.

From 2014 to 2019, Donaldson was the program director of Nightwood Theatre's script development program Write From the Hip. As part of Write From the Hip, Donaldson helped to develop Rose Napoli's Lo (or Dear Mr. Wells) which she later directed as part of Nightwood's regular season in 2017. Donaldson also developed Jane Doe's Grace and then and directed it for Nightwood's main season. In 2019, Donaldson replaced Kelly Thornton as artistic director of Nightwood Theatre.

Outside of Nightwood and Tarragon, Donaldson has directed Howard Barker's The Possibilities (2004), Erin Shields’ The Unfortunate Misadventures Of Masha Galinski (2007) and Beautiful Man (2019), and Harold Pinter's Betrayal (with Soulpepper, 2019).

Donaldson is also an actor and has played such roles as the Prince in Shakespeare in the Ruff's 2016 production of Romeo & Juliet. In addition, she sometimes teaches directing at the National Theatre School of Canada.

== Personal life ==
Donaldson is married to Rob Baker. She has a son, Theodore Fitz.

== Awards ==
Year	Award	Category	Work	Result	Notes	Ref.
2005	Dora Mavor Moore Awards	Outstanding Performance	And By the Way, Miss	Won		
2005	Dora Mavor Moore Awards	Outstanding Production	And By the Way, Miss	Won	with Urge Collective	
2011	Dora Mavor Moore Awards	Outstanding New Play or New Musical (Independent Theatre Production)	Montparnasse	Nominated	with Maev Beaty and Erin Shields	
2013	Jean Gascon Award (Stratford Festival)			Won		
