= Nic Gotham =

Canadian jazz saxophonist and composer

Nicholas Ivor Gotham, known as Nic Gotham, (27 September 1959 – 25 July 2013) was a Canadian jazz saxophonist and composer. His 1992 chamber opera, Nigredo Hotel, won two Dora Awards and was nominated for the Floyd S. Chalmers Canadian Play Award.

== Biography ==
=== Life and career ===
Gotham was born in Eastleigh, England and grew up in Ancaster, Ontario where his family emigrated when he was four years old. He studied at the University of Western Ontario and at York University, Toronto under the saxophonist David Mott and composer James Tenney. In the mid-1980s he played with Fred Stone's improvising ensemble (known informally as Freddie's Band). He went on to form his own ensembles which were active in the Canadian jazz scene during the late 1980s and 1990s, including his first band "Gotham City", "Hemispheres" (a fifteen piece "big band" specialising in jazz and new music), and "40 Fingers" (an improvising saxophone quartet).

In 1988 Gotham approached Canadian playwright Ann-Marie MacDonald to write the libretto for his first opera, Nigredo Hotel after having composed the incidental music and sound effects for her play Goodnight Desdemona. The opera, a commission by Tapestry New Opera Works, was premiered by the company on 13 May 1992 at the Tarragon Theatre in Toronto. The production went on to win two Dora Awards and the work was nominated for the Floyd S. Chalmers Canadian Play Award. It was subsequently performed in several other Canadian cities and at the Glasgow Mayfest, revived in Toronto in 1995 and 2005, and received its Australian premiere in 2006.

Gotham received the Freddie Stone Award, which honours a Canadian musician "who reflects musical integrity and innovation", in 1997. The following year, he and his wife, the Latvian-Canadian playwright Ban̦uta Rubess, and their two children moved to Riga. There, Gotham became a prominent figure in the Latvian jazz and contemporary music world as a teacher, performer, and composer, with works commissioned and premiered by the Riga Saxophone Quartet, the Latvian Radio Choir, the Sinfonietta Riga and the Latvian National Symphony Orchestra. His second chamber opera Oh Pilot! with a libretto by Ban̦uta Rubess was premiered by the Latvian National Opera in 2007. Shortly before death he received his PhD in music composition research from Brunel University with a doctoral dissertation entitled Form and freedom: the marriage of musical systems and intuition. Latvian Radio 3 broadcast a program devoted to his life and music on what would have been his 54th birthday (27 September 2013).

=== Death ===
Gotham and his family returned to Canada after he was diagnosed with cancer in 2011. He died in Toronto at the age of 53.
