= Nigredo Hotel =

Chamber opera by Nic Gotham and Ann-Marie MacDonald

Nigredo Hotel is a chamber opera in one act composed by Nic Gotham to a libretto by Ann-Marie MacDonald. It premiered on 13 May 1992 at the Tarragon Theatre in Toronto in a production by Tapestry New Opera Works who had commissioned the opera. The production won two Dora Awards and the work was nominated for the Floyd S. Chalmers Canadian Play Award. Subtitled "an operatic thriller", it is set in Room 7 of a run-down hotel which takes its name from the Jungian concept of Nigredo or "dark night of the soul". The story involves an encounter between the beautiful but crazed woman who runs the hotel and a brain surgeon forced to take refuge there after crashing his car.

== Background and performance history ==
Jazz musician and composer Nic Gotham approached Ann-Marie MacDonald to write the libretto in 1988 after having composed the incidental music and sound effects for her play Goodnight Desdemona as well as the music for Boom, Baby, Boom!, a "jazz play" by his wife Ban̦uta Rubess, in which MacDonald played the role of Austra Mednis. Gotham had originally planned to have only one character, the brain surgeon Raymond. However, MacDonald convinced him to introduce a female character, Sophie, who would represent his other self, or "anima" in Jungian psychology. Tapestry New Opera Works premiered Nigredo Hotel on 13 May 1992 at Toronto's Tarragon Theatre in a production directed by Ban̦uta Rubess. It ran there for a month before the company took it on tour to British Columbia and in 1993 to Scotland for the Glasgow Mayfest.

Tapestry New Opera Works subsequently revived the production in 1995 for a run at the du Maurier Theatre Centre in Toronto and again in 2005 to celebrate the company's 25th anniversary. The opera was performed by the company again in 2006 as part of the Algoma Fall Festival in Sault Ste. Marie, Ontario. On that occasion it was performed at the Wellington Square Mall in a disused discount store which became part of the set. 2006 also saw the opera's Australian premiere when it was performed in Canberra by the Stopera chamber opera company in a new production directed by Caroline Stacey. City Opera of Vancouver revived Nigredo Hotel in September 2018 in a new production directed by Alan Corbishley.

== Roles ==
Roles, voice types, premiere cast
Role	Voice type	Premiere cast, 13 May 1992
Raymond, a brain surgeon	baritone	Jonathan Whittaker
Sophie, proprietor of the Nigredo Hotel	soprano	Shari Saunders

== Music ==
The opera's music is based on jazz harmonies and rhythms and is scored for two singers (soprano and baritone), clarinet, bass clarinet, double bass, electric bass, percussion, and piano. The Australian critic Janet Wilson wrote that the work would be more aptly described as a "dramatic jazz piece" rather than an opera, although the score contains the traditional operatic components of overture, recitatives, arias, and duets.
