= Eastern Front Theatre =

Theatre company based in Halifax, Nova Scotia

Eastern Front Theatre is a theatre company based in Dartmouth, Nova Scotia.

== History ==
Eastern Front Theatre was founded in 1993 by Mary Vingoe, Gay Hauser, and Wendy Lill. The company was formed to showcase the work of Atlantic Canadian playwrights and has produced over 200 original Canadian plays and has been nominated for four Governor General's Awards and 79 Robert Merritt Awards nominations, winning 19 of the latter.

In addition to regular yearly programming, Eastern Front Theatre has two annual festivals: Micro Digitals, established during the early days of COVID-19 in order to create access to short theatre works for online audiences, and STAGES, which features multiple works at various states of production.

The theatre's current artistic director is actor Kathryn McCormack.
