= Harlem Duet =

Play by Djanet Sears

- Original language: English
- Written by: Djanet Sears
- Characters: Billie; Mona; Othello; Magi (The Landlady); Amah (Billie's sister-in-law); Canada (Billie's father)
- Setting: Harlem (1928); Harlem (Present); Harlem (1860)

Premiere
- Date: 1997
- Place: Nightwood Theatre in Toronto

Harlem Duet is a 1997 dramatic play by Canadian playwright Djanet Sears. Billie, a young graduate student in Harlem, deals with her husband Othello leaving her for a white woman named Mona. The play moves through time to show Billie and Othello's relationship (or an analogue thereof) being torn apart by racial tensions at a Southern US cotton plantation in 1860, and in Harlem in 1928 and the present. Though the characters draw inspiration from Shakespeare's play Othello, Billie and the story are original creations.

Sears received the Governor General's Award for Best New Play and the Floyd S. Chalmers Canadian Play Award for Harlem Duet.

== Plot summary ==
=== Act 1 ===
Harlem, 1928. Billie and Othello discuss his infidelity with an unnamed white woman.

Harlem, Present. Billie lives in a walkup at the intersection of Malcolm X and Martin Luther King Boulevard in Harlem, NY. She is emotionally and intellectually broken as her husband, Othello, has left her for a white colleague named Mona. Billie is supported by her landlady and by Amah, her sister-in-law (her brother Andrew's wife), while she writes and lives as a shut-in.

Southern US, 1860. Othello, here a slave and blacksmith, woos Billie by gifting her his mother's handkerchief.

Harlem, Present. Billie is experimenting with chemical tonics and warns Amah that they are deadly if ingested. She ignores the ringing phone, believing it to be Othello - Amah suggests it may be Billie's estranged father, Canada. Othello finally arrives with Mona (who is never seen on stage) to retrieve his things. He and Billie begin to divide their books and dive into a conversation on race relations and how cultural pressures impacted their marriage. Eventually, Othello kisses Billie and they make love. Afterwards, he brushes her off and lies to Mona in front of her.

Southern US, 1860. Othello tells Billie that he will not flee to Canada with her because he has fallen in love with his white mistress, 'Miss Dessy'.

Harlem, Present. Billie prepares to move out of the apartment she shared with Othello. He returns with her pot, and with news: he is reneging on his promise to pay for one of her graduate school courses, and he and Mona are engaged. He attempts to defend himself by saying that being with white women is easier.

Harlem, 1928. Othello is dead on the floor, holding his handkerchief. Billie stands over him with a bloody straight razor.

Harlem, Present. Billie concocts a potion and pours it over Othello's handkerchief, but before she can enact her plan, Magi interrupts with news of a visitor. It is Billie's long-absent father, Canada.

=== Act 2 ===
Harlem, Present. Billie takes tea with Canada, who is eager to reunite with her. He presents her with her mother's ring and tries to make plans to visit again, but she is uncertain. The next day, Othello is back and Billie tells him she wants to return his handkerchief (given to earlier Billie in 1860), but that she needs a few days to 'find' it.

Southern US, 1860. Othello is lynched by hanging. Billie tells a story of a black man who wished to be white to his body.

Harlem, Present. Billie prepares the poisoned handkerchief and places it in a red box for Othello. In the process, she stains her hands with the solution and panics. She becomes violently ill (or possibly high), and Canada and Magi have an awkward conversation as they wait for her to recover. She finally emerges, and reconciles with Canada as he holds her and apologizes for being absent for so long.

Harlem, 1928. Othello and Billie sit in a dressing room as Billie shaves him. He claims he will never wear Blackface on stage, and says he is of Ira Aldridge stock, a great Black actor. Then he reveals that his White lover Mona is giving him the opportunity to play Pericles, Prince of Tyre. Billie cuts his throat with the razor.

Harlem, Present. Billie confesses to Magi that she plans to give Othello the poisoned handkerchief, but Magi argues that if African magic worked, the masters of slaves in the 1800s would have died a thousand times over. Billie is sick with anger and half-starved. She fantasizes (or remembers) seeing the apartment for the first time with Othello. They jump over a broom together, a traditional ceremony of marriage, and the memory dissipates. Magi takes Billie into the kitchen to feed her.

Later, Canada is cleaning the kitchen and encounters Othello, looking for the promised handkerchief. Othello sees the red box Billie prepared before her breakdown and takes it, telling Canada to say goodbye to Billie as she is absent.

Harlem, 1928. Othello is alone in a dressing room, dressing in tails and a top hat. He practices Othello's speech to Desdemona's father while applying black greasepaint - by the end of the speech he is in full Blackface.

Harlem, Present. Billie sings - she is in the psychiatric ward of Harlem Hospital where she is cared for by white doctors. Amah visits her. Canada enters and promises that he will not leave Billie alone again. Billie and Canada sing Aretha Franklin's version of Spanish Harlem together as the lights go down.

== Themes, sources, and notes ==
=== Race and history ===
The play's main theme is the impact of race on social interactions. Sears' aim is to give a more significant place to black characters on the Canadian stage.

A possible interpretation of the play is that Othello has internalized racism and yearns for the white acceptance. Elizabeth Gruber highlights the role of Mona as an access point to the white world and culture.

This play also reasserts the existence of an African culture remaining among slaves descendants with the choice of its location, Harlem. The stage directions often reference strong symbols of African-American culture and history while ancient African customs permeate the play through Billie's interest in Voodoo.

Harlem, as a significant and symbolic location, is portrayed historically, politically and musically through the recurrence of African-American jazz music cues and audio recordings throughout the piece, including pieces from:

- Martin Luther King Jr.
- March on Washington for Jobs and Freedom
- Malcolm X
- United States Declaration of Independence
- Marcus Garvey
- Paul Robeson
- Louis Farrakhan
- Jesse Jackson
- O. J. Simpson murder case
- Aretha Franklin
- Michael Jackson
- Million Man March
- Langston Hughes

The play also engages in the recent concern for the construction of a Canadian-ness, embodied by Billie's father, Canada. According to Louise Harrington, the play relates to the movement of emancipation from English literature by adapting Shakespeare in a more political and contemporary way.

=== Literary sources ===
Harlem Duet is an offshoot of William Shakespeare’s tragedy Othello. The plot revolves around the interracial marriage; the characters are named after Shakespeare’s characters: Othello and Desdemona (Mona in the present days and Miss Dessy in 1860).

Harlem Duet is set in a time period immediately before Othello as a prequel to Shakespeare's play, and the curse Billie puts on the Othello's handkerchief provides an explanation as to why harm came to everyone in Shakespeare's play that touched the handkerchief that Othello gave Desdemona.

=== Playwright's notes ===
The following notes by the playwright Djanet Sears were included in the programme for the September 2018 performance at the Tarragon Theatre:

In 1963, after Martin Luther King's "I have a Dream" speech at the March on Washington, Malcolm X told a journalist that Martin's dream would become a nightmare before it was over. Harlem Duet explores both the dream and the nightmare. Set in three eras, 1860, just prior to the emancipation proclamation, 1928, during the Harlem Renaissance, and contemporary Harlem, at the corner of Martin Luther King and Malcolm X boulevards (an actual place in New York City, 125th Street and Lennox Avenue), Harlem Duet is a non-chronological prequel to Shakespeare's Othello. That is, events in Harlem Duet take place before the events in Shakespeare's story, although the time-frames in Harlem Duet are subsequent to those in Shakespeare's drama.

Shakespeare is a god in the theatre. He is the most famous playwright in the history of the world, and Othello is the most well-known Black character in all of theatre. In fact, Othello has achieved an archetypal status of mythic proportion. But portraits of Othello, the character, or Othello the syndrome (morbid jealousy), all appear to have been painted by non-Black people. I wondered who would Othello be if he were alive today? Who was Othello in my world, in my culture? I soon realized that I might actually know this guy, this Othello. I might, in fact, know him quite well.

I was assisted here by the convergence of two pieces of text that Mr. Shakespeare kindly provided. The first centered on an inconsistency in statements that Othello makes in reference to the origin of Desdemona's handkerchief (a major plot point in Shakespeare's play). In act three, scene four, Othello declares:

...That handkerchief did an Egyptian to my mother give; she was a charmer, and could almost read the thoughts of people.

However in the last act of Shakespeare's work, as we approach the climax of the play, Othello supplies a completely different account of the strawberry spotted cloth, referring to it as:

...An antique token my father gave my mother.

This contradiction in the provenance of the handkerchief suggested to me that neither narrative likely contained the entire truth of the matter.

What also fascinated me was why absolutely everyone who touched the handkerchief in Shakespeare's play came to harm. Was there magic or malice woven into the web of that cloth? Moreover, who exactly would have placed it there, and why?

I often refer to Harlem Duet as a rhapsodic blues tragedy, in that it uses a blues aesthetic as a structural guide. The blues is a true art form, "It can be very profound. It tells the truth, but it's got a special sound, too, a special feeling," as Robert Switzer insists in his essay, "Signifying the Blues," "...a feeling... that can come upon you, that can come 'falling down like rain.'" Blues songs have got to have that feeling in them because you can't play the blues right unless you feel them. You can't share that feeling unless you feel it yourself.

As such, Harlem Duet emerges as a 7 stanza blues told in two acts. Using linear and non-linear narrative structures, the play embraces discernible blues qualities that assert tendencies of "antiphonal structures" (that is call and response), repetition, syncopation, fragmentation, solos, polyrhythmic improvisation, percussive melodies, hollers, scatting, ring shouts, and cyclicality.

21 years ago when Nightwood Theatre premiered Harlem Duet at the Tarragon Theatre Extra Space, an audience member came up to me to tell me how much she had loved the play. She then added, "This is not a Black play. This is a human play." Why would she believe that there was a difference? Aren't all Black experiences, human experiences? Aren't all Black plays, human plays?

== Productions ==
Harlem Duet was first produced by Nightwood Theatre in 1997 at Toronto's Annex Theatre.

Sears directed a production of the play in 2002 at Blue Heron Arts Centre in New York City.

The 2006 production at the Stratford Festival was the festival's first work by an African-Canadian playwright, and also the first to be directed by a black woman.

Harlem Duet was performed in the Tarragon Theatre in Toronto from September 18 to October 28 as part of their 2018-2019 season.

The Crane Creations Theatre Company led a Play Date event of Harlem Duet in January, 2022. This monthly play reading event is meant to raise awareness and appreciation of playwrights and playwrighting from around the world. Theatre artists held conversations about the themes, style, form, and related current world issues to the play.

== Sources ==
- Haven, Cynthia (14 May 2008). "Award-winning play Harlem Duet tells story of modern Othello". Stanford University.
- Friedlander, Mira (11 May 1997). "Review: 'Harlem Duet'". Variety.
