= Marianne Bachmeier =

German vigilante (1950–1996)

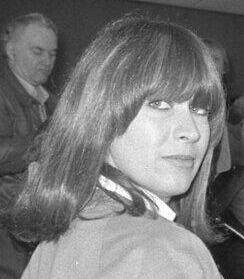
- Bachmeier in 1982
- Born: 3 June 1950; Sarstedt, Lower Saxony, West Germany
- Died: 17 September 1996 (aged 46); Lübeck, Schleswig-Holstein, Germany
- Resting place: Burgtor Cemetery, Lübeck, Germany
- Children: 3 (Note: Anna Bachmeier (daughter, 14 November 1972 – 5 May 1980 (aged 7), and two other children placed for adoption)
- Motive: Vigilantism
- Convictions: Manslaughter; Unlawful possession of a firearm
- Penalty: 6 years imprisonment

Details
- Date: 6 March 1981
- Locations: Lübeck, Germany
- Killed: Klaus Grabowski
- Weapon: Beretta 70

Marianne Bachmeier (3 June 1950 – 17 September 1996) was a West German mother and murderer who shot and killed Klaus Grabowski (1946 – 6 March 1981), a man on trial for the rape and murder of her daughter Anna (14 November 1972 – 5 May 1980), in the District Court of Lübeck in 1981. The case sparked extensive media coverage and public debate. Bachmeier was convicted of manslaughter and unlawful possession of a firearm. She was sentenced to six years and released on probation after serving three. Bachmeier moved abroad but returned to Germany after being diagnosed with pancreatic cancer. She died at the age of 46 and was buried next to her seven-year-old daughter, Anna, in Burgtor Cemetery, Lübeck.

== Early life and motherhood ==
Marianne Bachmeier was born on 3 June 1950. She grew up in Sarstedt, a small town near Hildesheim in Lower Saxony, West Germany, where her parents had fled from East Prussia after the Second World War.

Bachmeier was raised in a conservative home with devoutly religious parents. Her father, previously a member of the Waffen-SS, was the stereotypical authoritarian figure, a heavy drinker who spent much of his time at a bar close to the family home. Their household was not pleasant, and drinking made her father more aggressive. Her parents divorced, and her mother later remarried. Bachmeier was perceived as a troubled adolescent by—what she described as—a dictatorial stepfather, and her mother eventually kicked her out of the house.

In 1966, aged 16, Bachmeier had her first child, whom she placed for adoption as an infant. She became pregnant again at the age of 18 by her boyfriend. Bachmeier was raped shortly before the birth of her second child. Her second child was also placed for adoption as an infant.

Bachmeier began dating the manager of Tipasa, a pub where she worked, in 1972. She became pregnant for the third time at the age of 22. On 14 November 1972, Bachmeier's third child, Anna, was born, and she raised her as a single parent. As a result, Bachmeier took Anna to work at the pub, and she was said to never feel a need to rush home after her regular hours behind the bar.

In two 1984 documentary films, No Time for Tears: The Bachmeier Case and Anna's Mother, Bachmeier was portrayed as a single mother who worked well into the night and then slept into the day, leaving her seven-year-old daughter on her own during the day. Bachmeier was aware of her problematic lifestyle and wanted to put Anna up for adoption. Friends later said that she treated Anna like a little adult, and from a young age, expected her to take care of many things on her own. Anna frequently slept in the bar as her mother partied. According to a friend of Bachmeier, Anna was a vibrant youngster who never truly had a pleasant family life.

== Murder of Anna Bachmeier ==
Anna Bachmeier

Klaus Grabowski

On 5 May 1980, when Anna was seven years old, she had an argument with her mother and decided to skip school. On this day she was abducted by Klaus Grabowski, a 35-year-old butcher, whose home she had visited before to play with his cats. He held Anna for several hours at his home, sexually assaulted her and strangled her to death with a pair of his fiancée's tights. According to the prosecutor, he then tied the girl up and packed her into a box, which he left on the shore of a canal. Grabowski's fiancée then turned him in to the police.

Grabowski was a convicted sex offender. He had been sentenced for the sexual abuse of two girls. In 1976, he had submitted to chemical castration. Later, it was revealed that he underwent hormone treatment to try to reverse the chemical castration. Once arrested, Grabowski stated that Anna had sought to extort money from him by threatening to tell her mother about the abuse. He said his fear of going back to prison prompted him to kill her.

== Courtroom shooting ==
At around 10 a.m. on 6 March 1981, the third day of the trial, Bachmeier smuggled a Beretta 70 into the courtroom of Lübeck District Court, room 157, and fatally shot Grabowski. She aimed the gun at his back and fired eight times; six shots hit Grabowski, (Note: Eight shots, with seven hitting Grabowski, was also mentioned.) who was killed almost instantly. Bachmeier then lowered her gun and was apprehended without resistance. She also said in that moment: "I did it for you, Anna".

=== Public reaction ===
The incident is one of the most well-known cases of vigilante justice in West German history. It sparked extensive media coverage; television crews from around the country and overseas travelled to Lübeck to report on the case. Bachmeier sold her life story for about 100,000 Deutsche Marks to the news magazine Stern. With the fee, she covered her legal costs.

While Bachmeier was held in custody, many sent messages of support, gifts, and flowers to indicate their understanding of her conduct. Nonetheless, some still believed that a constitutional state should not condone vigilante justice. In addition, after Stern published her life story, and details about how she allowed her first two children to be adopted, public opinion shifted as she no longer appeared to fit the "innocent mother" image. Still, numerous individuals continued to openly demonstrate their compassion for the retaliatory action.

The West German judiciary was criticized for enabling a man who had sexually abused two girls to use hormones to regain his libido.

=== Sentence for manslaughter ===
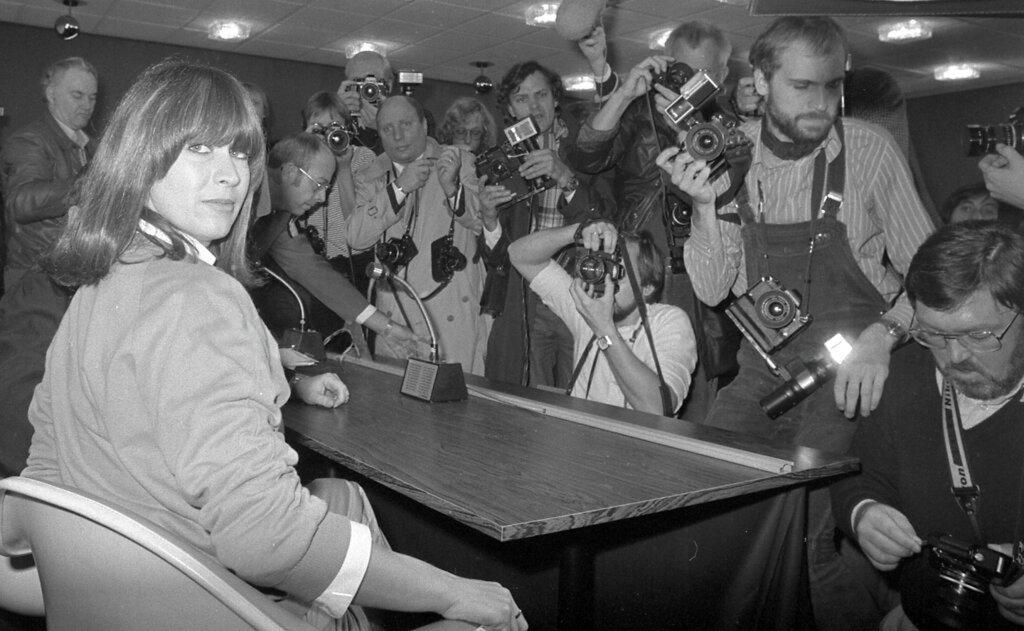
Marianne Bachmeier in the Lübeck Regional Court in Lübeck on 2 November 1982

On 2 November 1982, Bachmeier was initially charged with murder. Later the prosecution dropped the murder charge. After 28 days of court proceedings, she was convicted on 2 March 1983 by the Circuit Court Chamber of the District Court of Lübeck for manslaughter and unlawful possession of a firearm. The defense's argument that the act was not premeditated was mostly upheld by the court. She was sentenced to six years in prison but was released after serving three.

=== After Bachmeier's release ===
Bachmeier married a teacher in 1985. Three years later, they moved to Lagos in Nigeria and lived in a German camp where her husband taught at a German school. They divorced in 1990. After relocating to Sicily, Bachmeier was employed as an aide in a hospice in Palermo. She was diagnosed with pancreatic cancer in Sicily and then returned to Germany.

In 1994, thirteen years after the shooting, Bachmeier gave an interview to the Deutschlandfunk radio station. The same year, her autobiography was published by Schneekluth-Verlag. On 21 September 1995, she appeared on the television talk show Fliege on Das Erste, where she admitted to shooting Grabowski after careful consideration to enforce the law on him, and to prevent him from further spreading lies about Anna. In an ARD documentary from 2006, a former friend also said that Bachmeier rehearsed the shooting in the basement under Tipasa after Anna's murder. Bachmeier never expressed remorse for killing Grabowski.

== Death ==
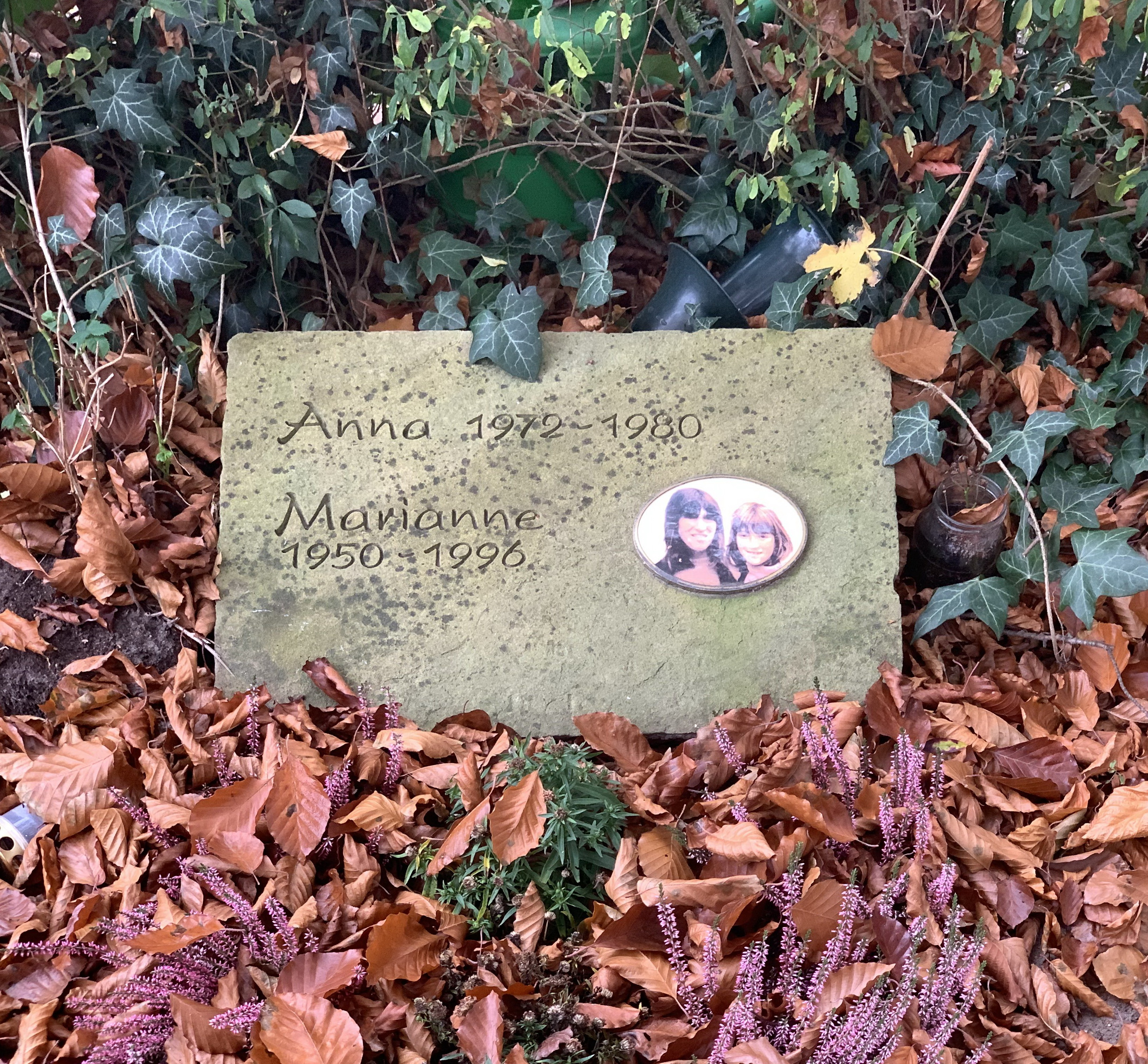
The grave of Anna Bachmeier and her mother, Marianne, in Lübeck's Burgtor Cemetery in 2022

Before her death, Bachmeier asked reporter Lukas Maria Böhmer of the broadcaster Norddeutscher Rundfunk to accompany her and film the last stages of her life.

On 17 September 1996, Bachmeier died at the age of 46 from pancreatic cancer in a hospital in Lübeck. She is buried next to her daughter, Anna, in Burgtor Cemetery, Lübeck.

== In popular culture ==
=== Plays ===
In the early 1980s, the Anna Collective, a group made up of Aida Jordão, Suzanne Odette Khuri, Ann-Marie MacDonald, Patricia Nichols, Baņuta Rubess, Tori Smith, Barb Taylor, and Maureen White, began work on a theatre piece about Bachmeier. A short version of the play premiered in 1983. The completed play, This Is for You, Anna, premiered in 1984.

=== Films ===
- 1984: Anna's Mother (German: Annas Mutter), film by Burkhard Driest (with Gudrun Landgrebe)
- 1984: No Time for Tears: The Bachmeier Case (German: Der Fall Bachmeier – Keine Zeit für Tränen), film by Hark Bohm (with Marie Colbin)
- 1996: The Slow Death of Marianne Bachmeier (German: Das langsame Sterben der Marianne Bachmeier), film by Lukas Maria Böhmer.

=== Documentaries ===
- 1993: Vigilante Justice of a Mother: The case of Marianne Bachmeier (German: Selbstjustiz einer Mutter: Der Fall Marianne Bachmeier) an interview with Bachmeier by Mirror TV
- 2006: Marianne Bachmeier's Revenge(German: Die Rache der Marianne Bachmeier), documentary of the show Die großen Kriminalfälle (season 5, episode 28) on the ARD channel
- 2017: When Women Kill: Marianne Bachmeier (German: Wenn Frauen töten: Marianne Bachmeier), documentary of the show Spectacular Criminal Cases on ZDF channel

=== Books ===
- Bachmeier, Marianne (1994). Palermo, Amore mio: [Roman] (in Italian). München: Schneekluth. ISBN 3-7951-1357-1. OCLC 33069444.

== See also ==
- Killing of Jeffrey Doucet – 1984 vigilante killing of sex offender in Baton Rouge, Louisiana
- Ellie Nesler – 1993 vigilante killing in Jamestown, California
