= Monique Mojica =

Monique Mojica is a playwright, director, & actor based out of Toronto, Ontario, Canada. She was born in New York City, but came to Canada as founding member of Native Earth Performing Arts.

She has appeared in several films and plays, including Smoke Signals in 1998, and her own stage play Princess Pocahontas and the Blue Spots.

== Biography ==
Mojica comes from a long line of theatre practitioners. Her mother, Gloria Miguel, and aunts Muriel Miguel and Lisa Mayo (born Elizabeth Miguel) are the founders of Spiderwoman Theater. Mojica began training in acting and theatre at the age of three and follows many of the traditions of storytelling and theatre creating seen in Spiderwoman's works.

She is of Guna, Rappahannock and Jewish ancestry. Jewish–Indigenous hybridity is one of the themes of both David Treuer’s and Mojica's work.

== Career ==
Her most famous plays include Princess Pocahontas and the Blue Spots, Birdwoman and the Suffragettes, and Chocolate Woman Dreams the Milkyway. She has collaborated with Floyd Favel on research and theatre projects that focus on Native performance culture.

From 1983 to 1985 she was artistic director of Native Earth Performing Arts, which is Canada's oldest professional Indigenous theatre company. She is currently the artistic director of Chocolate Woman Collective.

Along with Jani Lauzon and Michelle St. John, Mojica co-founded Turtle Gals Performance Ensemble which produced the plays The Scrubbing Project and The Triple Truth.

Mojica is co-editor of Staging Coyote's Dream: An Anthology of First Nations Drama in English with Ric Knowles. She has been nominated for best supporting actress by Native Americans in the Arts for her role in Smoke Signals.

In 2019, Mojica was involved with the launch of Canada's National Arts Centre's Indigenous Theatre. She performed in their first show, The Unnatural and Accidental Women by Metis-Dene playwright Marie Clements.

== Filmography ==
- Rabbit Fall (2007)
- The Perfect Man (2005)
- Sonny by Dawn (2005)
- Queer as Folk (2003)
- The Outer Limits (2001)
- The Misadventures of Tron Bonne - Police Captain
- La Femme Nikita (1999)
- Smoke Signals (1998)
- Earth: Final Conflict (1997)
- PSI Factor: Chronicles of the Paranormal (1996)
- Kung Fu: The Legend Continues (1996)
- The Rez (1996)
- Street Legal (1991-1992)
- Night Heat (1987)
- The Campbells (1986)

== Theatre appearances ==
- The Rez Sisters (Native Earth)
- Red River (Crow's Theatre)
- The Adventures of a Black Girl in Search of God (Nightwood Theare/Obsidian/Mirvish)
- Home is My Road (Factory Theatre)
- Death of a Chief (Native Earth/NAC)
- The Governor of the Dew (Globe Theatre/NAC)
- Jessica (TPM)
- Honour Beat (Theatre Calgary)
- Side Show Freaks and Circus Injuns - co-created by Mojica with LeAnne Howe and Jorge Luis Morejón
