= Maureen White (director) =

- Occupations: Director; Playwright; Actor; Artistic director
- Known for: Co-founder of Nightwood Theatre
- Notable work: This is For You, Anna

Maureen White is a Canadian theatre actor, director, and playwright. She was a member of The Anna Project, which created the play This is for You, Anna. White was a founding member of Nightwood Theatre and served as its artistic coordinator from 1987 to 1988.

== Career ==
In 1979, White co-founded Nightwood Theatre with Kim Renders, Cynthia Grant, and Mary Vingoe. With Nightwood Theatre, White acted in several shows including The True Story of Ida Johnson (1979), Glazed Tempera (1980), Flashbacks of Tomorrow (Memorias del Meñana) (1981), Mass/Age (1982), Baņuta Rubess' Burning Times and Smoke Damage: A Story of the Witch Hunts (both in 1983), Peace Banquet: Ancient Greece Meets the Atomic Age (1983), Rubess' Pope Joan (1984), and The Last Will and Testament of Lolita (1987). Because Nightwood Theatre was originally a collective, White was involved in the creation of several of these works.

In May 1980, White played Cellophane in Kim Renders' clown show, Soft Boiled, at the Rhubarb! Festival. She also acted in Renders' play Gently Down the Stream at the Spring 1980 Rhubarb! Festival. In November of that year, Renders and White co-created Soft Boiled #2 and performed it at the Rhubarb! Festival. (Note: There were two Rhubarb! Festivals (spring and fall) in 1980.) At that same festival, White and Mary Durkan's theatrical adaptation of Flann O'Brien's The Best of Myles premiered. Soft Boiled #3 premiered at the November 1982 Rhubarb! Festival. Renders and White reprised their earlier roles and were joined by Cheryl Cashman. An expanded performance of Gently Down the Stream, under the title Four-Part Discord, was performed by White, Renders, Grant, and Vingoe at "Caution: Women at Work", a weekend of performances as part of Women's Perspectives ’83.

White was a member of The Anna Project along with Suzanne Odette Khuri, Ann-Marie MacDonald, and Baņuta Rubess. The group collectively developed the play This is For You, Anna, inspired by Marianne Bachmeier. A twenty-minute version of This is For You, Anna premiered in 1983 at the Women's Perspective Festival. In the Spring of 1984, White, Khuri, MacDonald, Rubess, Patricia Nichols, Tori Smith, and Barb Taylor toured southern Ontario with the show. This is for You, Anna was nominated for a Dora Mavor Moore Award in 1984. In 1985, the play toured England. In the 1985 production, White played the roles of Marianne #1, Mother, Amaranta, Victim 1, Friend (last section), and Woman 2.

At Rhubarb! 1984, White appeared in Ann-Marie MacDonald and Beverly Cooper's Nancy Drew (Goes in Search of Her Missing Mother). Nancy Drew later became a full-length production titled Clue in the Fast Lane. Clue in the Fast Lane was directed by White in 1985 at Theatre Passe Muraille. White adapted Deena Metzger's The Women Who Slept With Men to Take the War Out of Them for the stage with Baņuta Rubess. The play was featured at The Theatre Centre R&D Festival in 1984. Following the festival, Rubess and White were invited to develop the work further at the Montreal Playwrights' Workshop.

White became the artistic coordinator of Nightwood Theatre in August 1987. As was the case with the preceding artistic coordinator, Mary Vingoe, White held the position for a fixed two-year term. While serving as artistic coordinator, White shifted focus from acting to directing and directed the following shows: Beverly Cooper's Artist Angst: A Political Thriller (1987), Kate Lushington and The Clichettes' Let's Go to Your Place (1987) and Up Against the Wallpaper (1988), and Cooper's Thin Ice (1988). In 1988, White left Nightwood and Kate Lushington was hired as artistic coordinator.

In 1989, White directed Mary Vingoe's The Herring Gull's Egg at Theatre Passe Muraille. In 1990, White directed Ann-Marie MacDonald's The Arab's Mouth at Factory Theatre. White directed James W. Nichol's adaptation of Margaret Laurence's The Stone Angel in 1993 at Theatre Passe Muraille.

== Personal life ==
White moved to Ireland in the late 1990s.

== Plays ==
- This is For You, Anna - co-written with Ann-Marie MacDonald, Suzanne Odette Khuri, and Baņuta Rubess
- The Best of Myles - adapted from Flann O'Brien with Mary Durkan
- Soft Boiled #2 - co-created with Kim Renders
- Soft Boiled #3 - co-created with Kim Renders
- Peace Banquet: Ancient Greece Meets the Atomic Age - co-written with Micah Barnes, Sky Gilbert, Dean Gilmour, Cynthia Grant, Charis Polatos, Kim Renders, Judith Rudakoff, and Philip Shepherd
- The Women Who Slept With Men to Take the War Out of Them - adapted from Deena Metzger with Baņuta Rubess
- The Last Will and Testament of Lolita - co-written with Louise Garfield, Baņuta Rubess, and Peggy Thompson

== Awards ==
Year	Award	Category	Work	Result	Notes	Ref.
1993	Dora Mavor Moore Awards	Outstanding Direction (mid-size theatre)	The Stone Angel	Won		
