= Ethel Bruneau =

American dancer and singer (1936–2023)

- Born: Mae Waterman; January 1, 1936; Harlem, New York, U.S.
- Died: July 24, 2023 (aged 87); Montreal, Quebec, Canada
- Citizenship: American; Canadian
- Occupations: Dancer singer
- Years active: 1953–2019
- Known for: Tap dancing; nicknamed "Miss Swing" and "The Queen of Tap"
- Awards: Ethel Bruneau Prize (2020); Dance Collection Danse Hall of Fame (2021)

Ethel Bruneau (born Mae Waterman, January 1, 1936 – July 24, 2023) was an American-Canadian dancer, singer, and dance instructor in Montreal. Specializing in tap dancing, she was a frequent performer in Montreal nightclubs in the 1950s and '60s, earning her the nicknames "Miss Swing" and "The Queen of Tap."

== Early life and education ==
Mae Waterman was born in Harlem, New York on January 1, 1936. Her father was Barbadian, and her mother was Jamaican. She studied dance at the Mary Bruce Dance Academy, at the Katherine Dunham School of Cultural Arts, and with Martha Graham and José Limón.

== Career ==
She performed on television programs hosted by Ed Sullivan, Milton Berle, and Sid Caesar. As a teenager in 1953, she appeared for the first time in Quebec alongside Cab Calloway's swing orchestra. An agent from Montreal noticed her and suggested she stay in Canada to work there, at which point Bruneau moved permanently to Montreal.

At the height of her career, she was said to perform 365 days a year in the cabarets and restaurants of Montreal, such as Rockhead's Paradise, the Rialto, and the Mocambo. She became known as the city's "Queen of Tap Dancing," or "Miss Swing."

Waterman met Henri "Ti-Rouge" Bruneau, who would become her husband, in 1956. She opened her first dance studio in the early 1960s in western Montreal, where she shared her passion for tap dancing. The following decade, she pursued studies in early childhood education at McGill University, specializing in developmental disabilities such as autism, Down syndrome, and deafness.

In the 1980s, she opened a second dance studio on the premises of the Universal Negro Improvement Association and African Communities League, in Montreal's Little Burgundy, considered a historic center of the city's Black community. Children from low-income families in the area had access to free courses at the school, which was open for some 25 years. Her final dance school, in Dorval, remained open until 2019.

== Awards and recognition ==
In 2009, the Black Theatre Workshop gave Bruneau its annual Dr. Martin Luther King Jr. Achievement Award. In 2020, she was awarded the Ethel Bruneau Prize, created in her honor by the Prix de la Danse de Montréal, and the following year she was inducted into the Dance Collection Danse Hall of Fame.

== Death ==
Bruneau died on July 24, 2023, at the age of 87.
