= This Is for You, Anna =

1983 Canadian play

This is For You, Anna
- Original language: English
- Written by: Ann-Marie MacDonald; Suzanne Odette Khuri; Maureen White; Baņuta Rubess; Patricia Nichols; Aida Jordão

Premiere
- Place: Toronto Women's Perspective Festival

This is For You, Anna is a 1983 play devised by The Anna Collective. Initially developed as a 20-minute production for the Women's Perspective Festival, This is For You, Anna was re-written into a longer piece that premiered in 1984. The show went on to tour Canada and Britain throughout the 1980s. The play was created collectively in response to the crimes of German woman Marianne Bachmeier, who walked into a courtroom and shot the man who killed her daughter. The feminist play explores themes of violence, revenge, domesticity, and questions the roles of western women at the end of the 20th century.

== Development ==
This is for You, Anna was inspired by Marianne Bachmeier's vigilante murder of Klaus Grabowski, the man who was standing trial for the rape and murder of Bachmeier's seven year-old daughter, Anna. The play was developed by The Anna Collective which at various points contained Aida Jordão, Suzanne Odette Khuri, Ann-Marie MacDonald, Patricia Nichols, Baņuta Rubess, Tori Smith, Barb Taylor, and Maureen White. During its early stages, the play was created for five actors. This changed when Jordão left the Anna Collective, sometime in 1983 or 1984, and was replaced by Nichols. Officially, the play is credited to Khuri, Macdonald, Rubess, and White in its 1993 publication in an anthology of the Canadian Theatre Review.

The Anna Collective first presented a twenty-minute version of the play in 1983 at the Women's Perspective Festival. The full-length play premiered in 1984. The development of This is For You, Anna was largely funded by Nightwood Theatre.

=== Collective creation ===
This is For You, Anna was developed through the process of collective creation. This medium operates from a foundation of performers' own ideas and experiences, and the final production is largely devised within the rehearsal process itself. Additionally, many collectively created plays are characterized by an episodic, nonlinear narrative, actors playing multiple characters within the narrative, and a collaborative creative process which often explores the creators' own interests. The qualities of collective creation are evident in This is For You, Anna, as it rejects a linear chronology, each actor plays a number of roles (including each of the four actors portraying a different incarnation of Marianne Bachmeier herself), and the original cast of actors were also intimately involved in the creation of the text.

== Plot summary ==
This is For You, Anna is composed of eight scenes which flow together thematically, though are not necessarily connected chronologically. Marianne Bachmeier is played by each of the four actors throughout the play.

The play opens on all four Mariannes, each in their own worlds. They reflect on the act of walking into the courtroom before the shooting. The scene transitions into that of a mother telling her daughter a bedtime story in which a woman is tortured by a wealthy baron she loves. The daughter reimagines the ending of the story to include the woman getting revenge on the man who tortured her, and the accordionist turns this new ending into a song. Scene three begins with a narrator providing backstory on Marianne's life, and a brief overview of the event which inspired the play. All four actors then embody Marianne at different points of her life, having conversations with various other absent characters such as Anna (her daughter who was killed), her ex-partner, and an interviewer visiting her in prison. In scene four, the actors tell a paraphrased version of the Roman legend of Lucretia, which is reinterpreted to focus on the parallels between Marianne's own story and the legend itself: namely victim blaming and a desire for revenge.

In scene five, the four actors take on characters which speak to their own experiences with abuse and violence. They perform regimented choreography and talk amongst themselves; engaging in dialogue which communicates nuanced perspectives on the complications of living with and leaving abusive partners. Scene six deals with media portrayals of 'victims' and positions these as potentially problematic. In this scene, one actor takes on an 'interviewer' role, grills the other three with personal questions, and demands them to perform certain acts on command. In scene seven, all actors take on the role of Marianne once more, and delve into her intimate thoughts and feelings surrounding the courtroom shooting.

The play concludes with 'The Jury Scene' in which the actors take on the role of the jury which found Marianne guilty of murdering the man who murdered her daughter. The characters in this scene condemn Marianne for her actions and defend the man's point of view (who argued in court that Marianne's seven-year-old daughter had flirted with him which led him to commit the murder). These perspectives are written in small snippets, to be spoken rapidly by the cast in order to create an overwhelming crescendo for the audience. This shifts abruptly when the actors all resume their roles as Mariannes 1 through 4, and quietly support and affirm their actions to each other. The play ends.

== Production history ==
In 1984, Khuri, MacDonald, Nichols, Rubess, Smith, Taylor, and White toured Southern Ontario with a production of This is For You, Anna. Smith acted as stage manager and Taylor was an administrator. The touring production was funded by the Ontario Arts Council, Canada Council Explorations, and the Floyd S. Chalmers Fund. In the winter of 1985, the play toured Europe with all of the members of the Ontario tour except Nichols. The European tour was produced by The Anna Project and Nightwood Theatre. The original cast was White as Marianne #1, Mother, Amaranta, Victim 1, Friend (last section), and Woman 2; Khuri as Marianne #2, Accordionist, Arabella, Maria, Victim 2, and Woman 4; Rubess as Marianne #3, Narrator, Allegra, Eena, Interviewer, and Woman 1; and MacDonald as Marianne #4, Daughter, Friend (first section), Alicia, Jenny, Victim 3, and Woman 3.

In January 1986, This is For You, Anna played at Theatre Passe Muraille. In June 1986, it was performed at the duMaurier World Stage Festival. In the spring of 2004, Shelley Scott directed a production of This is For You Anna with the student theatre group at the University of Lethbridge. Hart House Theatre, the student theatre group at the University of Toronto, put on This is For You, Anna in 2015. Four Westmount Secondary School students, Hannah Byrnes-Wolfson, Nelie Diverlus, Bridget Mountford, and Jesse Adams, performed This is For You, Anna in 2017. The production made it to the regional competition level in the Ontario Sears Festival.

In February 2018, Theatre Antigonish staged the play under the direction of Kailin Wright. Theatre Antigonish's production was staged at St. Francis Xavier University partially in response to two students there being charged with sexual violence in 2017. This production updated the play to include contemporary references including some to the #MeToo movement, Brock Turner, and Fifty Shades of Grey.

== Publication history ==
This is for You, Anna was initially published in 1985 in Canadian Theatre Review. It was re-published by Canadian Theatre Review in their 1993 anthology, The CTR Anthology: Fifteen Plays from Canadian Theatre Review. The 1993 edition contained significant changes including the removal of production stills and of Smith and Taylor's names from the official Anna Collective. Notably, the later publication also removed the author's note insisting that no literal violence be depicted on stage. According to D. A. Hadfield, the 1993 edition, unlike the 1985 publication, presented the script in a fixed, literary entity.

== Analysis ==
The play makes use of a lyrical poetic style, and live accordion music is used to accompany frequent musical numbers which help to tell the story. This music does not work to create a traditionally polished musical theatre aesthetic. Rather, the music and storytelling create an ethereal, experimental 'folk' atmosphere characteristic of the early days of Nightwood Theatre.

Ann Wilson suggests that the play employs Brechtian effects through the play's episodic structure and by having four actors play Marianne. In her reading of the play, Marianne is presented as an 'everywoman.'
