= Rose Napoli =

Canadian playwright

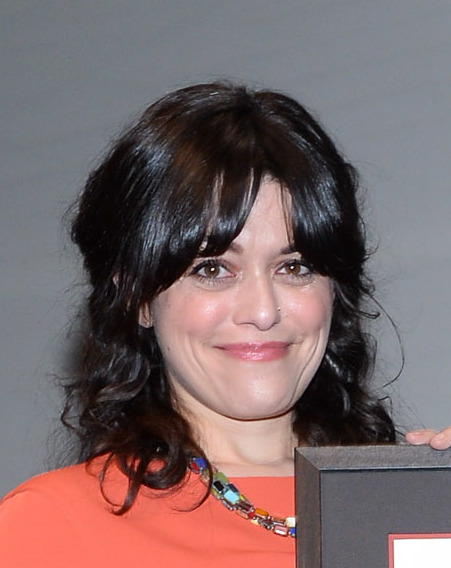
- Rose Napoli at the 2019 Bell Media Prime Time TV Program Showcase
- Occupations: Playwright; Actor
- Notable work: Lo (or Dear Mr. Wells)

Rose Napoli is a Canadian playwright and actor. Napoli is an alumnus of Nightwood Theatre's Write From the Hip Program where she developed her play Lo (or Dear Mr. Wells).

== Career ==
=== Acting ===
In 2016, Napoli was nominated for Outstanding Individual Performance in the Theatre for Young Audiences division of the Dora Mavor Moore Awards for her performance in Roseneath Theatre's The Incredible Speediness of Jamie Cavanaugh. In 2017, Napoli starred as math teacher Gabriella in Rob Kempson's Trigonometry. In 2018, Napoli was Celia in the St Lawrence Shakespeare Festival's production of As You Like It. Napoli played Beatrice in the 2019 Shakespeare in High Park production of Much Ado About Nothing as directed by Liza Balkan. In Nightwood Theatre's 2019 premiere of Grace, Napoli played the titular Grace's older sister Sarah.

=== Playwriting ===
Napoli's play Ten Creative Ways to Dispose of your Cremains premiered at the 2017 Toronto Fringe Festival with Napoli in the lead role of Lucy. The 2017 production was directed by Carly Chamberlain and co-starred Jakob Ehman as Bennett. Napoli described Ten Creative Ways to Dispose of your Cremains as "millennial love letter to the misfits of the Peter Pan Generation".

Lo (or Dear Mr. Wells) premiered in October 2017 as part of Nightwood Theatre's Consent Event double-bill alongside Ellie Moon's Asking For It. Napoli developed Lo as part of Nightwood's Write From The Hip script development program in 2014. The play is a two-hander that follows 25 year old Laura as she revisits a relationship she had with her English teacher, Mr. Wells, when she was 15. The 2017 premiere was directed by Andrea Donaldson and starred Vivien Endicott-Douglas as Laura and Sam Kalilieh as Mr. Wells. The play was inspired by Napoli's experiences working as an educator. Lo (or Dear Mr. Wells) was nominated for a Dora Award for Outstanding New Play in 2018.

Napoli's play, Mad Madge, about Margaret Cavendish, is set to premiere with Nightwood Theatre in April 2024.

== Plays ==
- A Death and the Marias
- Legacy
- Lo (or Dear Mr. Wells)
- Oregano
- Ten Creative Ways to Dispose of your Cremains
- That's Amore
- Mad Madge

== Awards ==
Year	Award	Category	Work	Result	Ref.
2016	Dora Mavor Moore Awards - Theatre for Young Audiences	Outstanding Performance - Individual	The Incredible Speediness of Jamie Cavanaugh	Nominated	
2018	Dora Mavor Moore Awards - General Theatre	Outstanding New Play	Lo (or Dear Mr. Wells)	Nominated	
