= Karin Randoja =

Canadian theatre director and dramaturge

Karin Randoja is a Canadian theatre director and dramaturge. A partner with Anna Chatterton and Evalyn Parry in the theatre collective Independent Aunties, she is most noted for her work on the play Gertrude and Alice, which was a shortlisted finalist for the Dora Mavor Moore Award for Outstanding New Play in 2016 and for the Governor General's Award for English-language drama at the 2018 Governor General's Awards.
