= Magnetic North Theatre Festival =

Annual festival in Canada

- Founded: 2002
- Type of play: Multidisciplinary
- Website: http://www.magneticnorthfestival.ca/

The Magnetic North Theatre Festival was an annual festival celebrating theatre and related performing arts in Canada operated by the Canadian Theatre Festival Society in partnership with the National Arts Centre. The festival was held Ottawa every two years, with it being held in other Canadian cities in the alternating years. Other cities that have hosted the festival include Edmonton, St. John's and Vancouver. The festival offered not only productions and performances for the theatre-going public but also workshops and seminars for theatre students and professionals.

== The festival ==
The impetus that resulted in the creation of Magnetic North Theatre Festival grew out of experiences Marti Maraden had travelling across Canada in her role as artistic director of the National Arts Centre ("NAC"). Through relationships Maraden built early in her tenure, the NAC contemplated the creation of a national theatre festival. During a theatre conference in 2002, NAC staff discovered that other theatre professionals were considering the same idea, resulting in a movement to organize such an annual festival. As the national theatre community had little desire for such a festival to be "owned" by the NAC or entrenched in Ottawa, organizers settled on having the location of the festival alternating with Ottawa.

In 2002, the Canadian Theatre Festival Society was incorporated for the purpose of operating the festival in partnership with the NAC. Mary Vingoe was appointed as the festival's first artistic director. Barbara Howatt was Magnetic North's first Executive Director. The society's mandate was to produce and promote contemporary English language theatre in Canada of high artistic standards of a national scope. Promoted as "Canada's National Festival of Contemporary Canadian Theatre in English", the first Magnetic North Theatre Festival was held in Ottawa in 2003.

In addition to a presenting a slate of theatrical performances, the festival held lectures, workshops, symposia, discussion panels, and opportunities to meet the performers of the various productions as well as prominent members of the Canadian theatrical community. In addition to targeting the general public, the festival's offerings included events catering to working professionals in the theatre, like networking and community-building activities. The festival was instrumental in raising the profile of Canadian touring artists and companies, many of whom secured regular national and international touring thanks to their participation in Magnetic North. Some of these notable companies and artists who were Magnetic North mainstays included Theatre Replacement, Electric Company Theatre, Neworld Theatre (Vancouver), Catalyst Theatre (Edmonton), One Yellow Rabbit (Calgary), Crow's Theatre, Mammalian Diving Reflex (Toronto), Artistic Fraud of Newfoundland (St John's) and Zuppa (Halifax). Sherrie Johnson, Sarah Garton Stanley, and Ann-Marie Kerr provided leadership as Industry Series Producer and Encounters Series Curators.

Total festival attendance in 2007 was over 9,000. In 2008, the festival featured 53 performances, involving 10 works in the main program at eight venues, as well as the "Magnetic Encounters" artist talk series and the industry networking event, bringing the total number of public events to over 80.

Ken Cameron succeeded Vingoe as artistic director in 2007 and served in that position until 2010. Ann Connors was the Executive Director. They were supported by Naomi Campbell, Industry series producer and Kris Nelson, Encounters Series Curator. After Ken, then Ann's sole tenure as CEO, Brenda Leadlay took over. The festival's final artistic director was Brendan Healy, who was named to the position in 2016.

On March 22, 2017, the Magnetic North Theatre Festival announced that it would be cancelling its upcoming 2017 season and would be permanently cancelling the festival. The festival stated that due to the festival's accumulated debt, continued operations of the festival would be untenable.

However, on September 15, 2017, a group of artists and administrators stepped forward to revive the festival by establishing a new board of directors for the organization and developing a plan to retire its debt. The organizers intended to relaunch the festival in 2019.

== Festival locations ==
Alternating with Ottawa every second year, the Magnetic North Theatre Festival was held in the following cities:

- 2003 Ottawa, Ontario
- 2004 Edmonton, Alberta
- 2005 Ottawa, Ontario
- 2006 St. John's, Newfoundland and Labrador
- 2007 Ottawa, Ontario
- 2008 Vancouver, B.C.
- 2009 Ottawa, Ontario
- 2010 Kitchener and Waterloo, Ontario
- 2011 Ottawa, Ontario
- 2012 Calgary, Alberta
- 2013 Ottawa, Ontario
- 2014 Halifax, Nova Scotia
- 2015 Ottawa, Ontario
- 2016 Whitehorse, Yukon
- 2017 Ottawa, Ontario (Cancelled)
- 2019 Vancouver, British Columbia

== Artistic directors & Executive Directors ==
- Mary Vingoe AD (2002-2007) & Barbara Howatt ED
- Ken Cameron (2007-2010) & Ann Connors ED
- Ann Connors (2010-2012, as artistic executive director)
- Brenda Leadlay (2012-2016, as artistic executive director)
- Brendan Healy (2016)

== Industry Series and Encounters Series Associates & Curators ==
- Ann-Marie Kerr
- Sherrie Johnson
- Naomi Campbell
- Kris Nelson
- Marcus Youssef
- Robert Chafe
- Dustin Scott Harvey
