= Kim Roberts (actress) =

Canadian actress

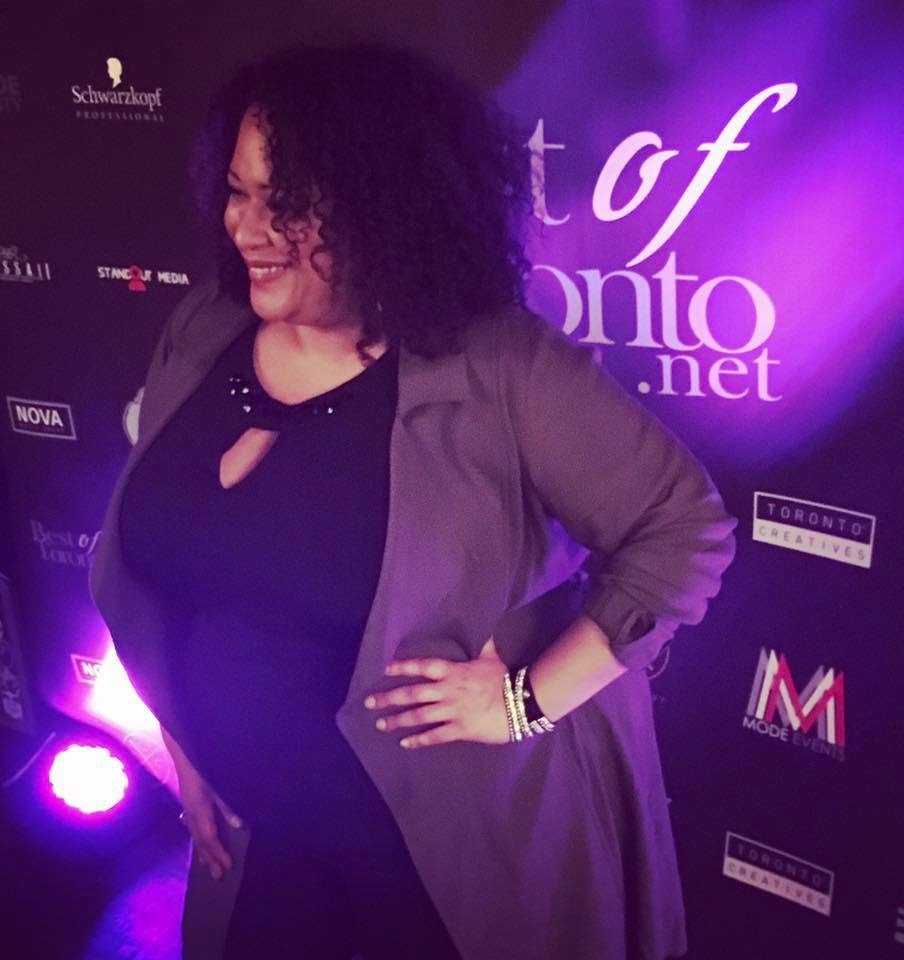
- Roberts in 2017
- Born: Toronto, Canada
- Education: University of Western Ontario, York University
- Occupation: Actress
- Years active: 1991–present

Kim Roberts is a Canadian actress, best known for her roles as Mayor Goodway in Paw Patrol, Greta on The Sinner, Christine in The Handmaid's Tale, Marnie in Schitt's Creek, Neeva in The Strain, Gloria in Lucky Seven, Camilla in Being Erica, Mazz in The Doodlebops, Mrs. Arvin in I'm Not There, Deborah in Saw III and Saw IV and Mrs. Bosco in The Cheetah Girls.

== Early life ==
Roberts' parents are from the Caribbean. Her mother, Josephine is from the Creole island of Dominica and her late father, Oswald, was born in Jamaica. They met and married in Toronto, Canada, where Roberts and her brother Mark were born. Roberts still has close ties to both islands. As a child, Roberts performed as a member of The Friendship Circle, a group of young singers and dancers directed by Lois Lilienstein of Sharon, Lois and Bram and her partner Louise. The ensemble toured locally, singing folk songs at schools and festivals like Mariposa, as well as appearing on Bram's TV show. Under the direction of her older cousins, Roberts began her stage career as a leading lady in home productions put on for friends and parents. She attended a drama lab at the University of Toronto at age 12, which solidified her interest in the craft. While enrolled in the gifted program at Earl Haig Secondary School, Roberts was given special permission to enter the acting stream at Claude Watson School for the Arts. Roberts finished her studies at C. W. Jefferys Collegiate Institute.

== Career ==
Roberts attended the University of Western Ontario majoring in political science and minoring in philosophy, with a view to becoming a lawyer. A theater class taken at York University one summer led to an invitation from Ron Singer, the chair of the Theater department, to study at York. Roberts accepted the invitation a year later, but before completing her studies, auditioned for and was cast in the Company of Sirens touring production of, "No Problems Here." She performed as well as produced and directed for the company over the next three years. Roberts branched out into film and television and became the first woman of African descent to portray the speaking heroine in a nationally televised Canadian commercial. The spot was for Benylin cough syrup. Since then, Roberts' resume has grown to include leading and recurring roles in over 200 different on-screen credits. She has shared screen and stage with the best of the artistic community, including Christopher Plummer, Helen Mirren, Jackie Chan, Lindsay Lohan, Eugene Levy, Debbie Gibson, James Garner, Julie Andrews, Robin Williams, Alfre Woodard, Mariah Carey, Raven-Symoné, Wesley Snipes, Tom Selleck, Farrah Fawcett and more. She has been directed and produced by many industry luminaries, of note, Steven Spielberg, Maya Angelou, Todd Haynes, Sidney Lumet, and Peter Bogdanovich.

Obsidian Theatre Company, Canada's premiere black theatre company, was founded in Roberts' home and she is one of thirteen founding members. Roberts narrated and performed The Book of Negroes for the Canadian Broadcasting Corporation’s podcast Between the Covers.

While shooting In the Company of Spies, in 1999, Roberts became one of the first actors to shoot a scene inside CIA Headquarters in Langley, Virginia.

== Personal life ==
Roberts was once romantically linked to jazz musician Christian McBride. She lived common law with Canadian actor Peter Bryant.

== Filmography ==
Film
Year	Title	Role	Notes
1996	Extreme Measures	Home Nurse	
1997	Bad Day on the Block	911 Operator	
1997	Critical Care	Intern #1	
1998	Blues Brothers 2000	Dancer	
1998	Down in the Delta	Isabelle	
1999	Judgment Day: The Ellie Nesler Story	Church Friend, 1983	
1999	The Misadventures of Tron Bonne	Digger (English version, voice)	Video game
2000	Chain of Command	Stephanie Ellis	
2000	Steal This Movie!	Auditor	
2001	Glitter	Mrs. Wilson	
2002	The Tuxedo	ER Nurse	
2004	Dawn of the Dead	Cora	
2006	Man of the Year	Make-Up Artist	
2006	One Way	Norah	
2006	Saw III	Deborah	
2007	Complete Idiot	Wanda	
2007	Charlie Bartlett	Dr. Linda Jenkins	
2007	I'm Not There	Mrs. Arvin	
2007	Saw IV	Nurse Deborah	
2008	Nurse.Fighter.Boy	Intern	
2008	Saving God	Dr. Munson	
2013	Carrie	Ms. Arlene Walsh (uncredited)	
2014	Dr. Cabbie	Courtroom Clerk	
2015	Remember	Paula	
2015	Fading Light (Short)	Ms. Thomas	
2016	A Man's Story (Short)	Léonie Eganda (Mother)	
2018	Love Jacked	Aunt Hilary	
2021	Paw Patrol: The Movie	Mayor Goodway (voice)	
2023	Paw Patrol: The Mighty Movie	Mayor Goodway (voice)	
2024	All the Lost Ones	Nancy	
2026	The Snake	Theresa	

Television
Year	Series	Role	Notes
1993	Street Legal	Immigration Officer	Episode: "Faking It"
1993	E.N.G.	Nurse	Episode: "Legacy"
1999	Little Men	Sylvia Walker	Episode: "Family Business"
1999	The City	Secretary	Episode: "Blindside!"
2000	The Others	Nurse	Episode: "Pilot"
2001	Doc	Neighbour	Episode: "Pilot: Part 1"
2001	The Associates	Delores	5 episodes
2001	Soul Food	Shelley	Episode: "Fly Away Home"
2002	Tracker	Miss Price	Episode: "Dark Road Home"
2002	Odyssey 5	Dr. Egrari	2 episodes
2002	Get a Clue	Miss Stern	
2003–08	Degrassi: The Next Generation	Mrs. Smith	4 episodes
2004	Wonderfalls	Peggy	Episode: "Wax Lion"
2004	Paradise Falls	The Doctor	2 episodes
2005	Air Emergency	Ruth Green	Episode: "Runaway Train"
2005	The Doodlebops	Mazz	26 episodes
2006	True Crimes: The First 72 Hours	Church Lady Olive Williams	Episode: "Frenzy"
2006	The Path to 9/11	Pan Am administrator	2 episodes
2007	Strangers in the Night	G.G. Gryce	
2008	The Trojan Horse	E.R. Nurse	Part One
2009	Turbo Dogs	Delivery Dog (voice)	Episode: "Ruffing It"
2009	Soul	Roslyn	5 episodes
2009	Da Kink in My Hair	Alisha	Episode: "Honesty the Best Policy?"
2009	Warehouse 13	Smithsonian Tour Guide	Episode: "Pilot"
2009	Guns	Althea Beckford	2 episodes
2010–13	Rookie Blue	Nan / Anita Nash	2 episodes
2010	Wingin' It	Mrs. Carter	Episode: "Cheer Me Up"
2010	The Bridge	Marta Davin	Episode: "Damned If You Do"
2010	Blue Bloods	Judge Waters	Episode: "Pilot"
2010	Lost Girl	Esther	Episode: "Oh Kappa, My Kappa"
2010	Razzberry Jazzberry Jam	Mrs. Trumpet (voice)	Episode: "Genre Busters"
2010	Being Erica	Camilla	5 episodes
2010	The Ron James Show	Manager	Episode: "New Year's Eve Special"
2010	Bloodletting & Miraculous Cures	Nurse Ronai	Episode: "All Souls"
2011	Suits	Glenda	Episode: "Dirty Little Secrets"
2011	Against the Wall	Alice	
2012	The L.A. Complex	Child Services Worker	
2013	Lucky 7	Gloria	4 episodes
2014	Remedy	'Auntie' Priscilla	Episode: "The Little Things"
2014	The Strain	Neeva	2 episodes
2015	Schitt's Creek	Marnie	Episode: "Allez-Vous"
2015	Single Ladies	DA Amelia Lawrence	Episode: "Remix"
2017	Ransom	Penny Williams / Mrs. Lewis	2 episodes
2017	Cloudy with a Chance of Meatballs	Regina Devereaux (voice)	Episode: "Virtu-Earl Reality"
2017	The Handmaid's Tale	Christine	Episode: "The Other Side"
2018	In Contempt	Judge Wells	3 episodes
2017–18	Baroness von Sketch Show	Martha / Kim / Spa Woman #3 /	3 episodes
2018	Dino Dana	Dr. White	Episode: "Dinosauroid/Dino Dana Says"
2019	The Kindness of Strangers	Female Plainclothes	
2018–19	Killjoys	Ginny	3 episodes
2019	When Hope Calls	Pearl Mayfair	7 episodes
2019	Abby Hatcher	Mrs. Melvin (voice)	8 episodes
2019–20	Diggstown	Ona Reeves	2 episodes
2020–present	Paw Patrol	Mayor Goodway (voice)	late Season 7-present
2020	Is There a Killer in My Family?	Mrs. Palmer	
2020	In the Dark	Pam Clarke	3 episodes
2020	Grand Army	Wanda	Episode: "Superman This S**t"
2023	Workin' Moms	Maggie	2 episodes
2023	Rubble & Crew	Mayor Goodway (voice)	2 episodes
2023	The Good Doctor	Yara's Mom	Episode: "Second Chances and Past Regrets"

== Awards ==
Roberts received the Harold Award for theater in 1996. She received the Reelworld Trailblazer award at the ReelWorld Film Festival in 2014 for her body of work in film and television. And in 2022 she received the Independent Leader Award at the Vaughan International Film Festival
