= Mary Vingoe =

Canadian playwright, actress and theatre director (1955–2025)

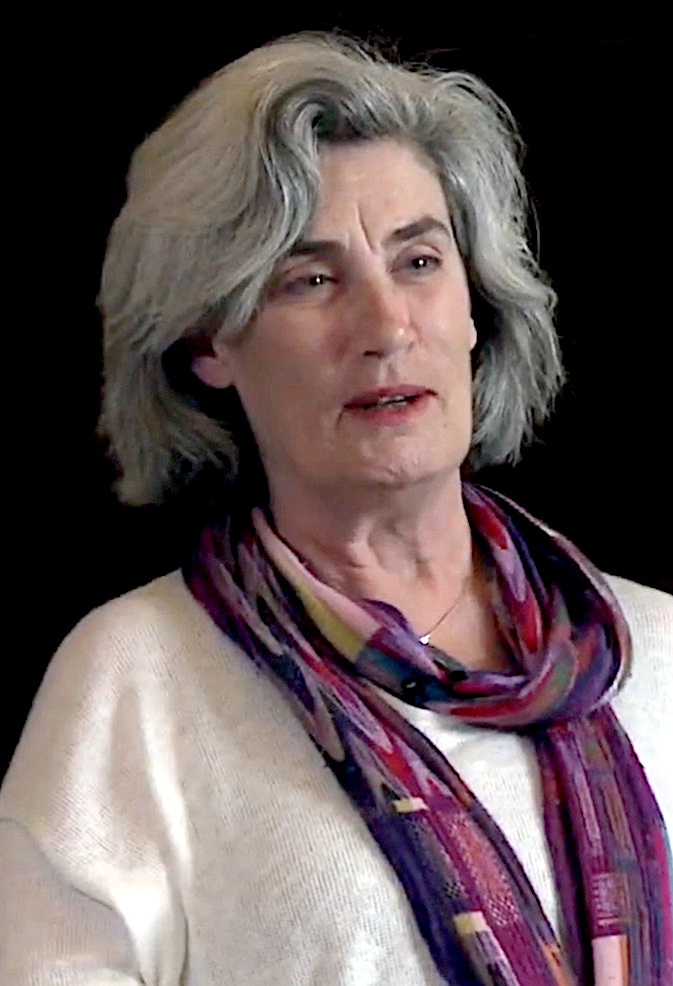
- Vingoe in 2016
- Born: Mary Helen Vingoe; May 12, 1955; Dartmouth, Nova Scotia, Canada
- Died: July 18, 2025 (aged 70)
- Education: Dalhousie University; University of Toronto
- Occupations: Playwright, theatre director, actress
- Spouse: Paul Cram (died 2018)
- Writing career
- Period: 1970s–2025
- Notable work: Refuge
- Notable awards: Officer of the Order of Canada; Portia White Prize (2009)

Mary Helen Vingoe (May 12, 1955 – July 18, 2025) was a Canadian playwright, actress and theatre director. She was one of the co-founders of Canadian feminist theatre company Nightwood Theatre and later co-founded Ship's Company Theatre in Parrsboro and Eastern Front Theatre in Halifax. From 2002 to 2007, Vingoe was artistic director of the Magnetic North Theatre Festival. Vingoe was an Officer of the Order of Canada and received the Portia White Prize. Her play Refuge was a shortlisted nominee for the Governor General's Award for English-language drama at the 2016 Governor General's Awards.

== Early life and education ==
Vingoe was born on May 12, 1955. Originally from Dartmouth, Nova Scotia, Vingoe studied theatre at Dalhousie University in Halifax. She graduated with a Bachelor of Arts (honours) from Dalhousie in 1976 and was awarded the University Medal in Theatre. Vingoe later attended the University of Toronto's Graduate Centre for Study of Drama.

== Career ==
Vingoe co-founded Toronto's Nightwood Theatre in 1979 with Cynthia Grant, Kim Renders, and Maureen White. Vingoe was the only founding member of Nightwood to be an Equity member at the time of founding. Vingoe served as Nightwood's first artistic coordinator from 1985, when Cynthia Grant left the collective, until 1987. The position was created to fulfil the same responsibilities as an artistic director but with a title that better suited Nightwood's origins as a collective.

Vingoe helped to collectively create works with other Nightwood collaborators, including 1979's The True Story of Ida Johnson and 1981's The Yellow Wallpaper. She acted in shows such as The Yellow Wallpaper (1981) and Pope Joan (1984). Vingoe also directed several plays while working with Nightwood, including Love and Work Enough (1984), Sally Clark's St. Francis of Hollywood (1987), Margaret Hollingsworth's War Babies (1985 and 1987), and The Herring Gull's Egg (1987), which she also wrote. Nightwood re-staged The Herring Gull's Egg in 1989 as directed by Maureen White.

In 1984, Vingoe co-founded Ship's Company Theatre in Parrsboro, Nova Scotia with Michael Fuller. Their first production, You'll be in Her Arms by Midnight and Other Parrsboro Stories, was performed on the M.V. Kipawo ferry. With Ship's Company, Vingoe directed several plays including Wendy Lill's The Glace Bay Miner's Museum. Vingoe directed The Glace Bay Miner's Museum again in 2012 for the National Arts Centre's English Theatre Company and served as an assistant director on the 1995 film adaptation of the play, Margaret's Museum.

In 1993, Vingoe co-founded Eastern Front Theatre in Halifax with Wendi Lill and Gay Hauser. In 2002, Vingoe directed a production of The Drawer Boy with EFT for which she was nominated for a Merritt Award for Outstanding Direction.

In 2002, Vingoe was appointed the first artistic director of the Magnetic North Theatre Festival, a festival celebrating Canadian English-language theatre. She stepped down from the position after the 2007 Magnetic North Festival.

In 2010, Vingoe directed the world premiere of Colleen Wagner's play Home at the Bus Stop Theatre in Halifax. The two founded HomeFirst Theatre that year with the intention of producing plays written by Atlantic Canadians. HomeFirst Theatre has since put on such plays as Wendy Lill's Messenger in 2015 with Neptune Theatre and the premiere of Vingoe's play Refuge in 2013 with Eastern Front Theatre.

Vingoe portrayed Wanda Greyson in the CBC radio drama Backbencher. Vingoe directed Alden by Richard Merrill, a play about poet Alden Nowlan at the 2011 NotaBle Acts Theatre Festival in Fredericton, New Brunswick. During Neptune Theatre's 2014/15 season as part of the Open Spaces program with Theatre Nova Scotia, Vingoe directed the Atlantic Canadian premiere of Catherine Banks' It Is Solved by Walking.

In 2018, Vingoe directed the musical Urinetown as part of Chester Playhouse's summer festival in Chester, Nova Scotia. Vingoe wrote the play Some Blow Flutes and directed its 2018 premiere at the Bus Stop Theatre.

=== Politics ===
In 2013, Vingoe ran for public office. She ran as the NDP candidate for Dartmouth South in the Nova Scotia provincial election but lost with 33.3% of the vote.

2013 Nova Scotia general election – Dartmouth South
Party	Candidate	Votes	%	±%
Liberal	Allan Rowe	4,049	46.24	+18.34
New Democratic Party	Mary Vingoe	2,918	33.32	-22.24
Progressive Conservative	Gord Gamble	1,612	18.41	+5.16
Independent	Jim Murray	178	2.03	

== Personal life and death ==
Vingoe was married to jazz musician Paul Cram who, before his death in 2018, worked as a sound designer on some of Vingoe's productions. The two had two children, Laura and Kyle Vingoe-Cram.

Vingoe died on July 18, 2025, at the age of 70, from multiple myeloma, which she had had for three years preceding her death.

== Plays ==
=== Ten Seconds After Closing ===
Ten Seconds After Closing premiered with Nightwood Theatre in 1980 under the direction of Cynthia Grant.

=== Holy Ghosters ===
Holy Ghosters is a historical drama set in the eighteenth century and features a non-linear structure. The play premiered in 1983 at the Mulgrave Road Co-Op Theatre as directed by Jan Kudelka. A revised version of Holy Ghosters was performed at Mount Allison University's Windsor Theatre in 1986.

=== Hooligans ===
Hooligans was co-written by Vingoe and Jan Kudelka with contributions from Ian A. Black, Jay Bowen, Cynthia Grant, Irene Pauzer, Kim Renders, Linda Stephen, Bruce Vavrina, and inspired by an idea from Pauzer. The play uses text from the diaries of Isadora Duncan, Edward Gordon Craig, Sergei Esenin, Kathleen Bruce, and Robert Falcon Scott. Hooligans premiered with Nightwood Theatre in March 1982.

=== The Herring Gull's Egg ===
In November 1987, Vingoe directed the premiere of her play The Herring Gull's Egg with Nightwood Theatre as part of the 3rd Groundswell Festival. The play received dramaturgy from Maureen Labonte. Nightwood re-staged The Herring Gull's Egg in 1989 under the direction of Maureen White.

=== The Company Store ===
Vingoe based her play The Company Store on the Sheldon Currie novel of the same name. The play premiered in 1996 at the Mulgrave Road Theatre Co-Op in Guysborough, Nova Scotia.

=== Living Curiosities: Or What You Will ===
Living Curiosities was inspired by the 'giantess' Anna Swan. The play is set in 1963 and follows Anna and other 'curiosities' in P. T. Barnum's show as they put on a production of Twelfth Night. Living Curiosities was workshopped at Word Festival! in Toronto in 1991 and then premiered in January 1992 with Anne-Marie MacDonald as Anna Swan. A revised version of Living Curiosities premiered in 2015 with Theatre Erindale at the University of Toronto Mississauga.

=== Refuge ===
Refuge uses actual text from a CBC Radio documentary in addition to fictive additions to tell the story of an Eritrean man seeking refugee status in Canada. The play premiered with Eastern Front Theatre and HomeFirst Theatre in 2013 and was subsequently staged by Nightwood Theatre in 2016. In 2014, Refuge was nominated for Outstanding Play by a Nova Scotian Playwright the Merritt Awards. Refuge was a finalist for the 2014 Lieutenant Governor of Nova Scotia Masterworks Astounding Art Awards. Refuge was also nominated for the Governor General's Award for English-language drama in 2016.

=== Some Blow Flutes ===
Some Blow Flutes premiered with HomeFirst Theatre at the Bus Stop Theatre in Halifax in 2018. The play follows a teenage girl caring for her grandmother who has dementia. Some Blow Flutes was nominated for Outstanding New Play by a Nova Scotian at the 2019 Merritt Awards.

== Awards and recognitions ==
Year	Award	Category	Work	Result	Notes	Ref.
1984	Dora Mavor Moore Awards	Outstanding Production of a Play – Children's Category	Love and Work Enough	Won	Vingoe directed	
2002	Merritt Awards	Legacy Award		Won		
2002	Merritt Awards	Outstanding Direction	The Drawer Boy	Nominated	with Eastern Front Theatre	
2007	Merritt Awards	Mayor's Award for Achievement in Theatre		Won		
2009	Portia White Prize			Won		
2010	Merritt Awards	Outstanding Supporting Actress	Ivor Johnson's Neighbours	Nominated	As Minnie, with Ship's Company	
2011	Merritt Awards	Outstanding Director	To Capture Light	Nominated	with Mulgrave Road Theatre	
2014	Merritt Awards	Outstanding Play by a Nova Scotian Playwright	Refuge	Nominated		
2016	Governor General's Awards	Governor General's Award for English-language drama	Refuge	Nominated		
2019	Merritt Awards	Outstanding Play by a Nova Scotian Playwright	Some Blow Flutes	Nominated		

Vingoe was named an Officer of the Order of Canada in 2010.
