= The Adventures of a Black Girl in Search of God =

Canadian drama series

- Written by: Djanet Sears
- Setting: Modern Canada

Premiere
- Date: 2002
- Place: Toronto

The Adventures of a Black Girl in Search of God is a drama written and produced by Canadian playwright Djanet Sears. The production ran from October 2003-March 2004, co-produced by Obsidian Theatre and Nightwood Theatre, and was reprised in 2015 at the National Arts Centre and Centaur Theatre. A print version of this play was published by Playwrights Canada Press in 2003.

The play is set in modern-day Canada, telling the story of the fictional Doctor Rainey Baldwin-Johnson within the factual Black community, Negro Creek, of Holland Township, Ontario. This community dates back to the War of 1812 when it was granted to Black settlers for their contributions to the British forces. This is touched upon many times within The Adventures of a Black Girl in Search of God; Rainey and the other characters of the play, being the descendants of Black loyalists who were granted the Ojibwe land that would become Negro Creek, are constantly confronted by the attempted erasure of their history.

The play is a "re-visioning" of The Adventures of the Black Girl in Her Search for God, a 1932 short story by George Bernard Shaw, using Sears' own style drawn from West-African conventions of storytelling to articulate Rainey's negotiation of the loss of faith she feels after the death of her daughter. Sears includes a singing chorus who become the living set for the play. The chorus becomes the image of Negro Creek, the fields and trees of the rural setting, but most importantly they form the souls of those who came before Rainey and her Father's generation; thus acknowledging the extensive Black history in Negro Creek, and Canada.

== Plot summary ==
=== Act I ===
Starting with Rainey alone, running down the street with a stiff child in her arms, the prologue begins and the voices of the chorus become the sound of splashing rain and a congregation gathered at mass. Here the timelines converge, learning that Rainey is holding her dying child as she rushes to find help, while the daughter's future funeral is performed simultaneously. The prologue comes to a conclusion with Rainey running out of the church and separating from her husband.

Transitioning into a different scene, the five elderly black members of the Lotsa Soap Cleaing company, an acronym for "Liberation (of) Thoroughly Seditious Artifacts Symbolizing (the) Oppression (of) African People," are plotting to liberate offensive garden gnomes they have discovered in aristocratic homes. However, these lawn jockeys and other stereotypical ornaments are not the only thing threatening oppression of the Black community of Negro Creek; the town council has changed the name of Negro Creek Road to that of a European settler, among many other instances of oppression. Therefore, this organization, consisting of Rainey's father and his friends, has a much more significant goal; they want to resist the attempted removal of their history, and reclaim the jacket of Juma Moore, who was granted the land of Negro Creek for his efforts in the Coloured Militia.

Meanwhile, three years pass since Rainey lost her daughter, and she sits by the creek ruminating on the loss of child and faith in God, the imminent divorce from her husband Michael, and her illness where she craves the consumption of the sweet soil of Negro Creek along with aspirin and other substances. Returning to the house, Rainey stumbles upon the 357 liberated offensive ephemera that Lotsa Soap has collected, and learns of their larger plans to which she refuses.

Unfortunately, in a heated argument her father, Abendigo, collapses and is taken to hospital where the characters are told of his terminal heart condition and the little time that he has left.

=== Act II ===
Refusing to let Lotsa Soap's plan to reclaim their history via over and covert resistance, Abendigo plans a heist to get back Juma Moore's jacket and a march for the name change back to Negro Creek Road all on the same day. However, extra care is taken to make sure Rainey does not find out, for she is very opposed to their idea of liberation. Between Abendigo's brief recovery and the museum heist, the town's church is vandalized with racial slurs. This lights the fire under the Lotsa Soap Cleaning Company, as they recruit Michael to their ranks.

While Rainey grapples with the grief of her lost daughter, and the forthcoming death of her father, she plunges into Negro Creek, a place thought to contain the souls of her ancestors. Here she confesses to Michael that her problem is not that she does not believe in God, but that she does and is torn apart by questioning how this sorrow could come upon her. Michael, the pastor, in turn tells Rainey that he is a fraud, a preacher who does not believe the words he says. As they bathe in the creek, they find their connection to the Earth, those ancestors before them, and receive a sort of healing.

However, Lotsa's show must go on. As they proceed with their covert mission into the museum, Rainey joins Lotsa Soap and they successfully retrieve the Coloured Corps militia jacket belonging to Juma Moore. They also receive the news that Negro Creek Road's name is to be restored, and they end the journey relaxing by the shores of Negro Creek, where Abendigo passes away.

The Lotsa Soap members along with Michael and Rainey prepare his body and lay him to rest in his desired spot: a cemetery plot facing the creek. The story ends with the creation of a mausoleum showcasing the 357 liberated ephemera upon his grave. Rainey and Michael rekindle their love as they are bathed in the creek one more time.

== Primary Characters ==
- Rainey Baldwin-Johnson, the main character of the story. She is an African-Canadian doctor questing to find closure after the loss of her daughter.
- Michael Baldwin, is Rainey's husband. He is the pastor at the local church.
- Abendigo Johnson, Rainey's father, and the leader of the Losta Soap Cleaning Company. He is diagnosed with a major heart condition, but battles through his last days to liberate the Black history of Negro Creek from the grasp of the Holland Township.
- Ivy, a member of Lotsa Soap, and Abendigo's love interest.
- Darese, a member of Lotsa Soap.
- Girlene, a member of Lotsa Soap.
- Bert, a member of Lotsa Soap.

== Original Cast ==
Character	Performer
Rainey	Alison Sealy-Smith
Michael	David Collins
Abendigo	Walter Borden
Ivy	Lili Franks
Bert	Herbert Johnson
Darese	Jackie Richardson
Girlene	Barbara Barnes-Hopkins
Paramedic, Dr. Radcliffe, Delivery man, and guard	Michael Spencer Davis
Chorus	Ingrid Abbott, John Campbell, Jennifer Dahl, Xuan Fraser, Sharon Harvey, Cassel Miles, Monique Mojica, Carlos Morgan, Alejanddra Nunex, Vivine Scarlett, Lincoln Shand, Shameema Soni, Saidah Baba Talibah, Tricia Williams,

== Historical References ==
- Martin Luther King Jr.: an American activist significant in the Civil Rights Movement
- Olivier Le Juene, who was the first named African to live in Canada.
- Chaka: a Zulu warrior.
- The Black Panthers
- Rosa Parks
- Harriet Tubman

== Awards ==
- Shortlisted for a Trillium Book Award (2004)
