= Harold Kandel =

Harold Kandel (May 30, 1906 – 1994) was a legendary theatregoer from Toronto, Ontario, Canada, known for speaking out during theatre events, contrary to the standard social conventions of western adult theatre.

Notably, he was barred from the Stratford Festival for just this social violation. The legend of Harold has grown to be honored by performers across Canada, in the year of his death, theatrical awards in the city of Toronto, and a Fringe theater festival review magazine adopted his name. He was issued complimentary seats to all shows performed by Mump and Smoot.

The Harold Awards are now presented each spring in an informal atmosphere and the nominees are unaware that they are in the running for the award.

In 1995, the Harold Awards published this description of its namesake - theatregoer and frequent heckler Harold Kandel.

Harold is an old man who goes to the theatre. He does not hear very well and his eyes are bad. Mostly he likes the people. He always sits at the front and claps in all the wrong places and yells out Marxist slogans during tender moments and calls the actors by their real names. (Once he went to see a play where at one point a watermelon would roll out and surprise the audience, and he went several times so that just before the watermelon would roll back out he could yell; ‘Here comes the watermelon!’ Things like that.) Mostly people suffer Harold grudgingly roll their eyes when they see him in a line but when he dies there will be a big award named after him: and everyone will want to win.
