= Zab Maboungou =

Franco-Congolese dancer, writer and choreographer

Zab Maboungou is a Franco-Congolese dancer, writer and choreographer.

== Early life ==
Maboungou was born in Paris, France to a Congolese father and French mother. She was raised in Congo-Brazzaville where her father was part of the independence movement. After a coup, the family moved back to Paris. While reading philosophy at university, she met a Québécois man and moved to Quebec with him.

== Career ==
Maboungou’s choreographic work rejects the contemporary and traditional labels in African dance to probe the politics of naming in dance. In 1988, she founded the Compagnie Danse Nyata Nyata in Montreal where she is based. She has since choreographed and performed numerous solo and group works, among which Mozongi which received the Prix de la danse de Montréal in 2015.

Maboungou's steadfast advocacy and support of dance and the performing arts of Africa and the diaspora has garnered her numerous prizes and accolades, including being honoured during Kriye Bode’s 5th Annual Colloquium on Haitian Dance & Drum at Alvin Ailey American Dance Theater.

Since 2004 Nyata Nyata has also been a teaching institution, dispensing the two-year Programme d’entraînement et de formation artistique et professionnel en danse (PEFAPDA - artistic and professional training program in dance).

Since 2015 Zab Maboungou/Compagnie danse Nyata Nyata has been a member of the International Dance Council.

In May 2019, Maboungou was named to L'Ordre des arts et des lettres du Québec. Dubbed a "Queen Mother" by the CBC, Zab Maboungou was the 2021 recipient of the Governor General's Award Lifetime Artistic Achievement Award, Canada's highest civilian recognition in the field.

== Dance works ==
- 1993: Réverdanse
- 1997: Mozongi
- 1999: Incantation
- 2005: Lwáza
- 2006: Nsamu
- 2007: Décompte
- 2009: Gestes Dé/libérés
- 2010: Montréal by Night
- 2018: Wamunzo

== Writing ==
- Heya... danse ! Historique, poétique et didactique de la danse africaine, CIDIHCA, Montréal, Canada, 2005

== Awards ==
- 1999: "Grand hommage", Ministry of culture of Cameroon
- 2003: "Pioneer of African Dance in Canada", Dance Immersion, Toronto
- 2015: Prix de la danse de Montréal, Prix du CAM pour la diversité culturelle en danse
- 2019: L’Ordre des arts et des lettres du Québec
- 2021: Governor General's Lifetime Artistic Achievement Award
