= Baņuta Rubess =

Canadian theatre director, playwright and professor (born 1956)

- Born: Baņuta Nora Rubess; 1956 (age 69–70); Toronto, Ontario, Canada
- Education: Queen's University (BA); University of Oxford (PhD)
- Notable work: This is For You, Anna
- Spouse(s): Nic Gotham (until his death, 2013)
- Website: banuta.com

Baņuta Rubess (born 1956) is a Latvian-Canadian theatre director and playwright. She co-wrote This is For You, Anna as a member of the Anna Project. Rubess was a co-recipient of the 1988 Floyd S. Chalmers Canadian Play Award for children's theatre for her play Thin Ice.

== Early life ==
Rubess was born in 1956 in Toronto to Latvian parents. She spent six years living in Germany as a child.

Rubess graduated with a BA honours in history and drama from Queen's University in 1977. In 1978, she received a Rhodes Scholarship to the University of Oxford. Rubess completed a doctorate of modern history at St Antony's College in 1982.

== Career ==
In 1982, Rubess co-founded the 1982 Theatre Company in London, England.

Rubess was a member a theatre collective called The Midnight Hags, founded by Mary Ann Lambooy. The collective created a piece called Burning Times which premiered in August 1983 at The Theatre Centre. Burning Times used quotations from the Malleus Malificarum and told the story of female travellers who encountered the witch hunts. During the play's development, Lambooy disagreed with the other collective members about how they should run the collective. This dispute was so extreme as to have needed to be resolved by the Canadian Actor's Equity Association. After the initial production, Lambooy distanced herself from the collective and eventually wrote a letter to Nightwood Theatre to attempt to bar the group from re-staged Burning Times by invoking her copyright ownership.

Nightwood staged Burning Times under the name, Smoke Damage, in October 1983. The program for the production listed the play as being "written by Baņuta Rubess in collaboration with Peggy Christopherson, Mary Ann Lambooy, Ann-Marie MacDonald, Mary Marzo, Kim Renders, and Maureen White". Shortly thereafter, the authorship of Burning Times became the subject of a legal dispute. By December 1983, Lambooy stated that she would not give up copyright to Burning Times in addition to refusing to acknowledge Rubess as its principal author. The two parties came to the following agreement by the end of 1983:

"Rubess would receive all revenue up to $500 as playwright's royalties; any amount above that would be split as follows: 51 percent to Rubess, 45 percent to the Smoke Damage collective, and 4 percent to Lambooy."

Rubess was a member of The Anna Project which collectively created the play This is For You, Anna. The Anna Project consisted of Rubess, Suzanne Odette Khuri, Ann-Marie MacDonald, Patricia Nichols, Tori Smith, Barb Taylor, and Maureen White, though the play is usually credited only to Khuri, Macdonald, Rubess, and White. This is For You, Anna was originally presented as a twenty-minute play and premiered as a full-length play in 1984. Rubess went on to perform This is For You, Anna on tour with the Anna Collective, usually playing the roles Marianne #3, Narrator, Allegra, Eena, Interviewer, and Woman 1.

In the fall of 1984, Rubess and Maureen White's co-adaptation of Deena Metzger The Women Who Slept With Men to Take the War Out of Them premiered with Nightwood Theatre at The Theatre Centre's R&D Festival. The pair were invited to the Playwright's Workshop in Montreal to further develop the piece.

Rubess' play Froth, a theatrical exploration of shopping and materialism, premiered as a work-in-progress in 1994 as part of The Gathering, a women's theatre festival in Toronto. The production was staged at Kensington Market and featured Alisa Palmer, Susan McKenzie, and Rubess herself as actors. Two years later, Froth was performed again under the direction of Leah Cherniak. Rubess did not perform in the 1996 staging of Froth. The 1996 cast was Palmer, McKenzie, Janet Burke, and Bonnie Kim.

From 1985 to 1988, Rubess served as a board member of Nightwood Theatre. In 1992, Rubess was appointed co-artistic associate of Theatre Passe Muraille. She continued on in that position until 1996.

Rubess has taught at the University of Toronto in the theatre department since 2011.

=== Select directorial credits ===
- 1985: Portrait of Dora by Hélène Cixous at Nightwood Theatre
- 1988: Goodnight Desdemona (Good Morning Juliet) by Ann-Marie MacDonald at Nightwood Theatre
- 1991: The Avenging Woman by Aspazija at The Berkley Theatre – co-directed with Neil Barlett
- 1994: Still Clowning by Martha Ross and Leah Cherniak at Theatre Passe Muraille
- 1995: The Stillborn Lover by Timothy Findley at Theatre Passe Muraille
- 1996: Wedding Day At The Cro-Magnons by Wajdi Mouawad (translated by Shelley Tepperman) at Theatre Passe Muraille
- 2005: Nigredo Hotel by Nic Gotham and Ann-Marie MacDonald at Tapestry New Opera Works

== Plays ==
- Heroica – musical, in Latvian (1979)
- The Last Latvians (1983)
- Smoke Damage: A Story of the Witch Hunts – originally titled Burning Times (1983) (Note: See Career for information regarding the authorship dispute surrounding Burning Times and Smoke Damage.)
- Pope Joan (1984)
- The Women Who Slept With Men to Take the War Out of Them – adapted from Deena Metzger with Maureen White (1984)
- This is For You, Anna – with Suzanne Odette Khuri, Ann-Marie MacDonald, Patricia Nichols, Tori Smith, Barb Taylor, and Maureen White (1985)
- To Humbert Humbert – co-created with Maureen White, Peggy Thompson and Louise Garfield (1986)
- Thin Ice – co-written with Beverley Cooper (1987)
- The Last Will and Testament of Lolita – collective creation with Louise Garfield, Peggy Thompson, and Maureen White (1987)
- Boom, Baby, Boom! – with Nic Gotham (1988)
- Tango Lugano – in Latvian (1989)
- Horror High (1989)
- Bonnie and Clyde are Dead (1989)
- Froth (1994)
- Jaded (1998)
- Head in a Bag (1992)
- Oblivion – radio play (1994)
- No. Here Comes Ulrike Meinhof – radio play (1994)
- Oh Pilot – with Nic Gotham (2000)

== Awards ==
| Year | Award | Category | Work | Result | Notes | Ref. |
|---|---|---|---|---|---|---|
| 1995 | Dora Mavor Moore Awards – Mid-Size Theatre | Outstanding Direction | The Stillborn Lover | Nominated | | |
| 1989 | Dora Mavor Moore Awards – Small Theatre | Outstanding Production | Boom, Baby, Boom! | Nominated | for Banuta Rubess, Claire Hopkinson, Nic Gotham, and Company | |
| 1988 | Floyd Chalmers Award | Children's Play Award | Thin Ice | Won | for Beverley Cooper and Banuta Rubess | |

== Personal life ==
In 1998, Rubess moved to Riga, Latvia. She returned to Canada in 2012. She was married to Nic Gotham until his death in 2013. They have two children.
