= Obsidian Theatre =

Obsidian Theatre Company is a Canadian professional theatre company that specializes in works by Black Canadian artists. The company is located in Toronto, Ontario. The declared mandate of the company is a threefold mission: to produce plays, to develop playwrights and to train theatre professionals. Obsidian is dedicated to the exploration, development, and production of the Black voice. They produce plays from a world-wide canon focusing primarily, but not exclusively, on the works of highly acclaimed Black playwrights. Obsidian provides artistic support, promoting the development of work by Black theatre makers and offering training opportunities through mentoring and apprenticeship programs for emerging Black artists.

== History ==
Founded in February 2000, Obsidian Theatre Company has grown into a large independent theatre company with a full schedule of productions, playwright/play development and professional training programs. Since the company's inception, Obsidian has worked to change the profile of culturally diverse theatre in Canada by encouraging companies to re-evaluate the way artists of colour are involved in the work. The company does not manage its own physical theatre and rather partners with other theatre companies to produce works.

In 2021, the theatre created the web series 21 Black Futures for CBC Gem.

In 2022, Obsidian launched Young, Gifted & Black, a 14-month training program that invites five emerging Black artists each year and provides them with masterclasses, mentorships, apprenticeship placements, and ensemble creation.

== People ==
=== Founding members ===
- Awaovieyi Agie
- Ardon Bess
- David Collins
- Roy Lewis
- Yanna McIntosh
- Diane Roberts
- Kim Roberts
- Sandi Ross
- Djanet Sears
- Satori Shakoor
- Tricia Williams
- Alison Sealy-Smith
- Philip Akin

=== Board of directors ===
- Harmony Cohen - Chair
- Walter Gibbons - Treasurer
- Arlene Campbell - Secretary
- Ashima Chopra- Director
- Sascha Cole - Director
- Kevin Hanchard- Director
- Greg Holness - Director
- Stacey Norton - Director
- Bev Salmon- Director

=== Staff ===
- Philip Akin - Artistic Director (2005-2020); Mumbi Tindyebwa Otu (2020-)
- Michael Sinclair - General Manager
- daniel jelani ellis - Artistic Producer
- Cherise Solomon - Marketing and Development Officer

== Playwrights Unit ==
An integral part of the company is the Obsidian Playwrights Unit, a venue for exploration of ideas.

Playwrights commit to monthly meetings over a yearlong period (September to June). The group is headed by the Play Development Coordinator and is focused on playwright development as opposed to full-length play creation. This allows for each playwright to work on a short piece for workshop production and also explores a number of philosophical ideas that stimulate ideas and conversation.

In June, the playwrights are matched with three directors to work on staging the plays for a workshop production, culminating in a Performance showcase.

== Awards ==
- 2019 Dora Mavor Moore Award for Outstanding Production (School Girls; Or, The African Mean Girls Play)
- 2012 Dora Mavor Moore Award for Outstanding Production (Topdog/Underdog)
- 2012 Dora Mavor Moore Award for Outstanding Production (in partnership with Acting Up Stage Company) (Caroline, or Change)
