= Goodnight Desdemona (Good Morning Juliet) =

Play written by Ann-Marie MacDonald

- Original language: English
- Written by: Ann-Marie MacDonald
- Characters: Desdemona; Othello; Juliet; Romeo; Constance Ledbelly; Chorus; Student; Iago; Ramona; Tybalt; Mercutio; Professor Claude Night; A soldier of Cyprus; Juliet's Nurse; Servant; Ghost
- Setting: Constance's Office; Othello's citadel at Cyprus; Verona, a public place

Premiere
- Date: March 31, 1988
- Place: Toronto

Goodnight Desdemona (Good Morning Juliet) is a 1988 comedic play by Ann-Marie MacDonald in which Constance Ledbelly, a young English literature professor from Queen's University, goes on a subconscious journey of self-discovery.

Constance theorizes that Shakespeare's tragedies, Othello and Romeo and Juliet, were originally comedies, and believes the ideas for the plays originate from the indecipherable Gustav Manuscript. She believes this because, if a wise fool archetype were reinstated into the plays, they could not remain tragedies. However, she is too timid to show her skeptical boss, professor Claude Night, that she is right. In a moment of despair, Constance is thrown into both her subconscious mind and the two Shakespearian tragedies to discover the truth about herself, and to find the lost fool with the help of Desdemona and Juliet.

MacDonald received the Governor General's Award, the Floyd S. Chalmers Canadian Play Award and the Canadian Authors Association Drama Award for the play.

== Plot summary ==
=== Act 1 ===
Goodnight Desdemona begins with a "dumb show", or a scene with no sound, in which three situations occur simultaneously. Othello murders Desdemona, Juliet and Romeo kill themselves, and Constance Ledbelly throws a pen and a manuscript into a wastebasket.

In scene 1, Constance works on her doctoral dissertation, which claims that Romeo and Juliet and Othello were originally comedies written by an unknown author and that this can be proved by decoding a manuscript written by an alchemist named Gustav. Her longtime crush, Professor Claude Night, comes in, criticizes her dissertation topic, and tells her that he is taking a job at Oxford University that she had hoped to secure. Constance laments her fate and begins throwing her possessions into the wastebasket until she herself is sucked into the wastebasket.

=== Act 2 ===
The second act takes place on the island of Cyprus, within the world of Othello. During the scene where Othello resolves to kill his wife, Constance intervenes and reveals that Iago is tricking Othello. Othello binds Iago and expresses his gratitude to Constance. Desdemona arrives and asks whether Constance may stay with them. Othello tells Constance not to make known to Desdemona that he was jealous of his wife. Constance asks Desdemona for help in her quest to discover who originally wrote Shakespeare's plays. Desdemona agrees and tells her to come to battle. Constance wonders whether she has permanently changed Shakespeare's work and resolves to find the "Wise Fool", a typical Shakespearean character, who secures the happy ending of a comedy.

In scene 2, Iago discloses that he has a page from the Gustav manuscript and forms a plan to conspire against Constance. Constance bonds with Desdemona, telling of her relationship with Professor Night, while Iago eavesdrops. Constance describes the world of academia and her newfound feminist convictions. Desdemona encounters Iago carrying buckets of filth, and Iago stirs jealousy in her. Desdemona believes Iago's claims that Constance is a witch who is after Othello's heart, and she resolves to kill her.

Desdemona sees Othello give Constance a necklace, and her suspicions increase. Constance muses about what a strong woman Desdemona is. Iago and Desdemona enter, fighting with swords, and Constance nearly kills Iago, thinking that she is saving Desdemona. Iago shows Desdemona the page from the Gustav manuscript, saying that he found it in Constance's underwear drawer. Desdemona shows it to Constance, who confirms that it is hers. She reads its clue that she must seek truth in Verona, Italy. Before Desdemona can kill her, Constance is dragged offstage.

=== Act 3 ===
Act 3 takes place within the context of Romeo and Juliet. It begins with the scene in which Mercutio fights with Tybalt. Constance arrives and tackles Romeo to the ground before Tybalt can stab Mercutio under Romeo's arm. Romeo tells her, "Speak, boy", confusing her gender because Desdemona has ripped off Constance's skirt. Calling herself Constantine, Constance explains that they should stop fighting, because Romeo has married Juliet and they are all family now. They agree, and Romeo falls in love with Constance. The men make lewd jokes and go to the bathhouses. Constance wishes that she could go back home.

In scene 2, Juliet and Romeo wake up together and describe their declining interest in each other. They fight over their turtle, Hector, and end up ripping it in two; they part on bitter terms. Juliet complains to her nurse that she is dying of boredom and wishes that she could be unmarried, able to play the deadly game of love. The nurse tells her that she should cheer up, because she will enjoy the marriage festivities that night, and Juliet resolves to find another lover.

In scene 3, Constance pounces on a servant because she believes that he is the Wise Fool, but she finds instead that he is giving out invitations to a masked ball thrown by Juliet's father. In scene 4, Romeo and Juliet enter the masked ball, sulking at each other. Romeo thinks that Tybalt is Constance and puts his hand on Tybalt's bottom. Constance enters, and Romeo tells her that he loves her. Tybalt sees Romeo kiss Constance and sends Juliet to interrupt them. Romeo introduces Constance to Juliet, and Juliet falls in love with her.

Juliet dances with Constance while Romeo and Tybalt watch suspiciously. Tybalt resolves to kill Constance. Romeo decides to dress as a woman so that Constance will desire him, and he cuts in to dance with her. Juliet sees them and determines to dress as a man so that Constance will desire her. Romeo and Juliet begin to fight over Constance, and Constance tells them to apologize.

In scene 5, Juliet enters dressed in Romeo's clothing and woos Constance from below her balcony. They discover that they have the same birthday. Constance resists Juliet and tells her of her bitterness about love. Juliet tells her that she knows the name of the Wise Fool and will trade it for one kiss. Romeo then enters in Juliet's clothing, but Constance leaves before he can woo her.

Scene 6 takes place in the graveyard through which Constance walks on her way to Juliet's balcony. While she is there, she sees a ghost like that of the King in Hamlet, who tells her that the Wise Fool and the Author are the same "lass". The ghost disappears, and Tybalt enters, trying to kill Constance. Romeo steps between them, and Constance escapes.

In scene 7, Juliet pulls Constance up to her balcony with a rope. They share a long kiss, and then Juliet admits that she lied about knowing the name of the Wise Fool. Juliet tries to kill herself, but Constance pins her down and reveals that she is a woman. Juliet exclaims that she loves her all the more. Constance claims that she is not a lesbian, but Juliet convinces her that they should make love. Constance reaches under Juliet's shirt, where she finds a page from the Gustav manuscript.

A warp effect brings Desdemona to the scene, and she begins to smother Constance with a pillow. Juliet tries to save her and then goes to seek help. Constance holds up the necklace that Othello gave her, which has a birthday inscription to Desdemona, and Desdemona stops smothering her. Tybalt arrives, and Constance pretends to be dead, telling Desdemona to seek Juliet. In scene 8, Desdemona confuses Romeo for Juliet and tells him to meet them in the crypt.

Romeo, who is still in Juliet's clothes, has fallen for Desdemona. In scene 9, he invites her to lie with him in the crypt. Romeo confuses Tybalt for Desdemona, however, and Tybalt carries Romeo away, thinking that he is a maiden. Juliet enters and starts to stab herself out of sorrow, but Constance stops her, and they embrace. Desdemona enters and starts to stab Juliet until Constance stops her. Desdemona then urges Constance to come to Cyprus, while Juliet exhorts her to remain and die with her. Constance interrupts them and points out their faults. They promise to forgo their tragic impulses, and Constance realizes that she is both the Author of the play and the Wise Fool. Constance is then transported by warp effect back to her office at Queen's University, where she finds that her pen has turned to gold.

== Productions ==
Goodnight Desdemona (Good Morning Juliet) was commissioned and first produced by Nightwood Theatre at Toronto's Annex Theatre, premiering on March 31, 1988. The cast included Derek Boyes, Beverley Cooper, Diana Fajrajsl, Tanja Jacobs, and Martin Julien. The director and dramaturge was Baņuta Rubess, the stage manager was Maria Popoff, and the assistant director was Skip Shand.

With a revised text, it toured nationally in 1990 to Great Canadian Theatre Company, Northern Light Theatre, Vancouver East Cultural Centre and The Canadian Stage Company. The original cast remained, with the exception of Kate Lynch replacing Tanja Jacobs in the role of Constance Ledbelly. It has subsequently been produced over forty times in Canada and abroad.

In 1992, Classic Stage Company mounted a production featuring Cherry Jones, Hope Davis, and Liev Schreiber.

In 2016, Kate Newby directed Goodnight Desdemona (Good Morning Juliet) for The Shakespeare Company in collaboration with Handsome Alice at Vertigo’s Studio Theatre in Calgary, Alberta. This production starred Ayla Stephen as Constance and featured an all-female cast as a feminist reversal of the Shakespearean tradition of all-male casts. This was the first production of the play to make this casting choice.

Goodnight Desdemona (Good Morning Juliet) was performed in rotating repertory along with Shakespeare's Romeo and Juliet as part of the 2017 spring season at the American Shakespeare Center in Staunton, Virginia.

== Awards ==
Year	Award	Category	Result	Notes	Ref.
1988	Dora Mavor Moore Awards	Outstanding New Play	Nominated	for Ann-Marie MacDonald	
1988	Floyd S. Chalmers Canadian Play Award	General Theatre	Won	for Ann-Marie MacDonald	
1990	Dora Mavor Moore Awards	Outstanding Performance by a Female in a Featured Role	Nominated	for Diana Fajrasil	
1990	Governor General's Award	Drama	Won	for Ann-Marie MacDonald	
1991	Canadian Authors Association	Drama	Won	for Ann-Marie MacDonald	
