= Anna Chatterton =

Canadian playwright

Anna Chatterton is a Canadian playwright, who was shortlisted for the Governor General's Award for English-language drama at the 2017 Governor General's Awards for her play Within the Glass.

She was educated in theatre at Concordia University, and in creative writing at the University of Guelph, before becoming playwright in residence at Tarragon Theatre in 2011. Her first play, Quiver, was written as her master's thesis for her MFA at Guelph. Within the Glass premiered at Tarragon in 2016.

She is also a regular collaborator with Evalyn Parry and Karin Randoja in the theatre collective Independent Aunties. Their plays as a collective have included Francesca, Mathilda and Tea, The Mysterious Shorts, Clean Irene and Dirty Maxine, Breakfast and Gertrude and Alice. Gertrude and Alice was a shortlisted finalist for the Governor General's Award for English-language drama at the 2018 Governor General's Awards. After a nearly three-year delay due to COVID-19., Chatterton's play Cowgirl Up premiered at Alberta Theatre Projects in October 2022.
