= Djanet Sears =

Canadian playwright

- Born: Janet Sears; 1959 (age 66–67); London, England
- Citizenship: Canadian
- Education: Bachelor of Fine Arts honours in theatre
- Alma mater: York University Canadian Film Centre New York University
- Occupation: Playwright
- Writing career
- Genre: Drama
- Notable works: Afrika Solo, Harlem Duet, The Adventures of a Black Girl in Search of God

Djanet Sears is a Canadian playwright, nationally recognized for her work in African-Canadian theatre. Sears has many credits in writing and editing highly acclaimed dramas such as Afrika Solo, the first stage play to be written by a Canadian woman of African descent; its sequel Harlem Duet; and The Adventures of a Black Girl in Search of God. The complexities of intersecting identities of race and gender are central themes in her works, as well as inclusion of songs, rhythm, and choruses shaped from West African traditions. She is also passionate about "the preservation of Black theatre history," and involved in the creation of organizations like the Obsidian Theatre and AfriCanadian Playwrights Festival.

== Early life and education ==
Djanet Sears was born in 1959 in England, to a Guyanese father and a Jamaican mother. She lived there until 1974 when her family moved to Saskatoon, Saskatchewan, and then settled in Oakville, Ontario, in 1975. Her birth name was Janet — she added the D after a trip to West Africa where she came across a plateau called "Djanet," inspiring her to change her name as a nod to her African ancestry.

Sears attended York University, where she obtained an Honours Bachelor of Fine Arts in theatre in 1999, followed by studies at the Canadian Film Centre and New York University.

== Career ==
After returning from a trip to West Africa, Sears wrote her stage play Afrika Solo, which premiered in 1987, and sparked the creation of many other full-length plays like Double Trouble, and Harlem Duet. Sears is not only a writer for theatre but also has many credits in acting, directing, and editing multiple volumes of an anthology of Canadian African plays called Testifyin': Contemporary African Canadian Drama.

Sears contributed to the creation of the AfriCanadian Playwrights Festival in 1997, which is a culmination of African-centred plays on the Canadian stage. It was held in Toronto in 2003 as well as 2006. Sears also belongs to and is a founding member of the Obsidian Theatre, "dedicated to producing works by authors of African descent living or working in Canada."

Sears as an educator worked as an adjunct professor teaching drama at University College, University of Toronto. Additionally she has held many positions like the international artist-in-residence at Joseph Papp Public Theatre, the writer-in-residence at the University of Guelph, and playwright-in-residence at Nightwood Theatre.

== Plays ==
- Afrika Solo is primarily a one-woman show, along with a two-man chorus. It is a semi-autobiographical play that tells a story about a young woman trying to find herself getting through what new information she is learning along the way. The main character, Djanet, and her experiences are the focal point of the play.
- Harlem Duet takes inspiration from Shakespeare's Othello. The play is set on the corner of Martin Luther King Jr. and Malcolm X Boulevards. Sears choose this location because she wanted the audience to grasp the concept of race in Canada, and these streets were more familiar to the play's North American audience. The story follows Othello and Billie and their withering marriage as Othello begins to lean towards a white identity, mostly because of his affair with a character named Mona, who is a white woman. The story paints a picture of North America dominated by whiteness.
- The Adventures of a Black Girl in Search of God follows character Rainey, who is an African-Canadian doctor, and her hardships while living in Western Ontario. Rainey deals with losing a close family member, a failing marriage and tension between her and her father, who even with poor health and old age is on a mission to maintain his ethnic pride in his community.
- Who Killed Katie Ross
- Double Trouble
- The Mother Project

== Awards and honours ==
Sears full-length play Afrika Solo won the International Armstrong Award for Outstanding Radio Play (1991), and the Silver Prize at the International Radio Festival of New York (1991); its sequel Harlem Duet has acquired multiple Dora Mavor Moore Awards, and The Adventures of a Black Girl in Search of God was shortlisted for the Trillium Book Award (2004). Sears's other distinctions include an even more extensive list, including Canada's highest literary award.

- Sears won The Governor General's Literary Award (1998)
- Floyd S. Chalmers Canadian Play Award (1998)
- Martin Luther King Jr. Achievement Award (2004)
- The Harry Jerome Award (1998)
- Phenomenal Woman of the Arts Award
- Timothy Findley Award (2004)

== Directing credits ==
- The Adventures of a Black Girl in Search of God', Mirvish Productions, Toronto, Ontario, Canada. (2003/2004)
- Harlem Duet, Blue Heron Theatre, New York, NY. (2002)
- The Wonder of Man, Nightwood Theatre, Toronto, Ontario, Canada. (1992)
- Dark Diaspora... in Dub, Toronto Fringe Festival, Toronto, Ontario, Canada. (1990)
- Princess Pocahontas and the Blue Spots, Groundswell, May Works and From the Ground Up, Toronto, Ontario, Canada. (1989)
- Ella and Jennifer, Groundswell, Toronto, Ontario, Canada. (1989)
- AStreetcar Named Desire, Canadian Actor's Equity Association, Talent over Tradition, Toronto, Ontario, Canada. (1989)
- CopperTin Can, Groundswell, Toronto, Ontario, Canada. (1988)
- Shakes, Cabaret Productions, York University, Toronto, Ontario, Canada. (1982)

== Discography ==
- "Playsongs and Lullabies" Teds Records, Toronto Canada, (1989)
- "Conditions Critical" Verse to Vinyl Records, Toronto, Ontario, Canada, (1989)
- "Winterlong" Teds Records, Toronto, Ontario, Canada, (1991)
- "Daysongs and Nightsongs" Teds Records, Toronto, Ontario, Canada, (1993)
