= Billy Merasty =

Canadian actor

- Born: 1960 (age 65–66); Brochet, Manitoba, Canada
- Education: Centre for Indigenous Theatre
- Years active: 1989–present
- Relatives: Tomson Highway (cousin); René Highway (cousin)

Billy Merasty (born 1960) is an Aboriginal Canadian actor and writer of Cree descent.

== Early life ==
Merasty was born in Brochet, Manitoba, Canada. He is the ninth of fourteen children born to Viola and Pierre Merasty, and a grandson of Joe Highway, a famous caribou hunter and champion dogsled racer; and related to playwright Tomson Highway and dancer, choreographer, actor, and director René Highway.

== Career ==
Merasty moved to Toronto at the age of 18 in search of René Highway, who was then working for the Toronto Dance Theatre. At the age of 23, he launched his acting career after graduating from the Centre for Indigenous Theatre for aspiring First Nations artists. He then worked for the Native Earth Performing Arts for a long period. He has worked extensively on the stage and films as an actor and has written one play, Fireweed, produced in 1992. His second play, Godly's Divinia, is in development.

In 2010, Merasty received the Order of Manitoba (Order of the Buffalo Hunt) in recognition for his many years as an Aboriginal role model from Manitoba.

=== Stage work ===
His stage credits include appearances in Tomson Highway's The Sage, The Dancer and the Fool, Dry Lips Oughta Move to Kapuskasing and The Rez Sisters, Daniel David Moses' The Indian Medicine Show, Lanford Wilson's Rain Dance, Marie Clements' Copper Thunderbird, Kevin Loring's Where the Blood Mixes, Steven Cole Hughes' Ghost Dance and David S. Craig's The Neverending Story. In 2012, he performed the role of Gloucester in an all-aboriginal production of William Shakespeare's King Lear at the National Arts Centre in Ottawa, alongside a cast that also included August Schellenberg as Lear, Tantoo Cardinal as Regan, Jani Lauzon in a dual role as Cordelia and the Fool, and Craig Lauzon as Kent.

== Pledge ==
In September 2025, he signed an open pledge with Film Workers for Palestine pledging not to work with Israeli film institutions "that are implicated in genocide and apartheid against the Palestinian people."

== Filmography ==
=== Film ===
Year	Title	Role	Notes
1989	Justice Denied	Donald Marshall Jr.	
1990	The Shaman's Source	Mathew Hare	
1994	Exotica	Man at Opera	
1995	The Confessional	Moose	
1995	Pocahontas: The Legend	Kocoum	
1998	Honey Moccasin	Zachary John	
2004	Battle of the Brave	Owashak	
2005	The Big White	Cam	
2005	The New World	Kiskiak	
2010	Casino Jack	Bartender	
2018	Falls Around Her	Draven	
2019	The Incredible 25th Year of Mitzi Bearclaw	William Bearclaw	
2019	It Chapter Two	Shokopiwah Man	
2022	Stellar	Auntie 1	
2023	Café Daughter		
2024	Aberdeen	Alfred	
2025	Nika and Madison	Uncle George	

=== Television ===
Year	Title	Role	Notes
1989	Red Earth, White Earth	Tom Redfox	Television film
1991	Counterstrike	Hawk	Episode: "Native Warriors"
1992	The Broken Cord	Frank Cree	Television film
1993	Kung Fu: The Legend Continues	William Two-Feathers	Episode: "Shaman"
1993	X-Rated	Nathan Jones	Television film
1993–1994	The Red Green Show	Joshua Two Feathers	4 episodes
1994–1995	Liberty Street	Nathan Jones	26 episodes
1995	Tales of the Wild	Mawaki	Episode: "Les légendes du Grand Nord"
1999	War of 1812	John Norton	4 episodes
2000	The Virginian	Lee Talltrees	Television film
2002	Relic Hunter	Inuit Hunter	Episode: "Under the Ice"
2003	An American in Canada	Apak	Episode: "True North Strong and Almost Free"
2004	Wonderfalls	Jerry	Episode: "Totem Mole"
2005	This Is Wonderland	Brian Perot	Episode #2.8
2005	Into the West	Yellow Bird	Episode: "Ghost Dance"
2006	Indian Summer: The Oka Crisis	John Cree	4 episodes
2007	Bury My Heart at Wounded Knee	Young Man Afraid	Television film
2007	Moose TV	Leonard Sky	8 episodes
2007	Elijah	Elijah Harper	Television film
2008	Northern Lights	Jacob	Television film
2009	American Experience	Warrior	Episode: "Tecumseh's Vision"
2009, 2010	Mixed Blessings	Mark	2 episodes
2011	Moby Dick	Tashtego	2 episodes
2013	Hard Rock Medical	Thompson Morris	2 episodes
2015	Murdoch Mysteries	Elder	Episode: "All That Glitters"
2016–2018	Frontier	Kaagwa	7 episodes
2018	Cardinal	Billy Ralph Northwind	Episode: "Northwind"
2021	The Secret History of the Wild West	Poundmaker	Episode: "Peacemaker"
2021	Diggstown	Chief Thomas	Episode: "Jojo Carvery"
2022	Acting Good	Roger Laughingstick	
