= Dora Mavor Moore Award for Best Original Play (General Theatre) =

The Dora Mavor Moore Award for Outstanding New Play is an annual award celebrating achievements in Toronto theatre.

For most of the Dora Awards' history, separate awards have been presented for best play and Best Original Musical. For part of the 1990s, however, the two awards were merged with both musicals and dialogue-based plays competing in a single category. From 1980 to 1988, only a single award was presented each year; beginning in 1988, a separate award was introduced for Outstanding New Play, Small/Independent Theatre.

== Winners and nominees ==
=== 1980s ===
Year	Playwright	Title	Ref
1980	Linda Griffiths, Paul Thompson	Maggie and Pierre	
1980	Alun Hibbert	October's Soldiers	
1980	Tom Walmsley	Something Red	
1981	Allan Stratton	Rexy	
1981	Neil Munro	Extreme Close Up	
1981	Judith Thompson	The Crackwalker	
1981	George F. Walker	Theatre of the Film Noir	
1982	John Krizanc	Tamara	
1982	Lawrence Jeffery	Clay	
1982	Erika Ritter	The Passing Scene	
1982	Tom Walmsley	White Boys	
1983	Patrick Brymer, Linda Griffiths	O.D. on Paradise	
1983	Mavis Gallant	What Is to Be Done?	
1983	Richard Rose	Censored	
1983	George F. Walker	The Art of War	
1984	Autumn Angel Repertory: Stewart Arnott, Ines Ruchli, Mark Christmann, Dorian Clark, Denis Forest, Maggie Huculak, Tanja Jacobs, Susan McKenzie, Richard Rose	Mein	
1984	Jim Betts	The Mystery of the Oak Island Treasure	
1984	Lawrence Jeffery	Tower	
1984	Bob Knuckle, Gordon Carruth	I Am Not a Legend	
1984	George Luscombe, Larry Cox	Names	
1985	David French	Salt-Water Moon	
1985	Marie-Lynn Hammond	De beaux gestes/Beautiful Deeds	
1985	Michael Hollingsworth	The History of the Village of the Small Huts: Part 1, New France	
1985	John Krizanc	Prague	
1985	George F. Walker	Criminals in Love	
1986	Linda Griffiths, Maria Campbell	Jessica	
1986	Don Hannah	The Wedding Script	
1986	Margaret Hollingsworth	Islands	
1986	Maristella Roca	La Storia: A Tale of Fables	
1986	Allan Stratton	Papers	
1987	Tomson Highway	The Rez Sisters	
1987	René-Daniel Dubois	Being at Home with Claude	
1987	Margaret Hollingsworth	War Babies	
1987	John Lazarus	Genuine Fakes	
1987	Joan MacLeod	Jewel	
1988	George F. Walker	Nothing Sacred	
1988	Robert Fothergill	Detaining Mr. Trotsky	
1988	Ann-Marie MacDonald	Goodnight Desdemona (Good Morning Juliet)	
1988	Judith Thompson	I Am Yours	
1988	Michel Tremblay	Le Vrai Monde?	
1989	Tomson Highway	Dry Lips Oughta Move to Kapuskasing	
1989	Sally Clark	Moo	
1989	Ken Garnhum	Beuys, Buoys, Boys	
1989	Kelly Rebar	Bordertown Café	
1989	Michel Tremblay (tr. John Van Burek, Bill Glassco)	The Real World?	

=== 1990s ===
Years marked with a § are those in which the awards for Outstanding New Play and Outstanding New Musical were merged.

Year	Playwright	Title	Ref
1990	George F. Walker	Love and Anger	
1990	Howard Barker	The Europeans	
1990	Sally Clark	The Trial of Judith K	
1990	Joan MacLeod	Amigo's Blue Guitar	
1990	Michael Ondaatje, Richard Rose, D.D. Kugler	Coming Through Slaughter	
1991	Michel Marc Bouchard (translation by Linda Gaboriau)	Lilies	
1991	Linda Griffiths	The Darling Family	
1991	Ann-Marie MacDonald	The Arab's Mouth	
1991	Judith Thompson	Lion in the Streets	
1991	Michel Tremblay	La Maison suspendue	
1992	George F. Walker	Escape from Happiness	
1992	Michael Hollingsworth	Laurier	
1992	Bryden MacDonald	Whale Riding Weather	
1992	Paulette Phillips	Under the Influence	
1992	Paula Wing	Naomi's Road	
1993 §	Terrence McNally, John Kander, Fred Ebb	Kiss of the Spider Woman	
1993 §	Martha Ross, John Millard	Ratbag	
1994 §	Leslie Arden	The House of Martin Guerre	
1994 §	John Lazarus	The Nightingale	
1994 §	Michael O'Brien	A Christmas Carol	
1994 §	Andrew Sabiston, Timothy Williams	Napoleon	
1995 §	John Wimbs, Christopher Richards	Molly Wood	
1995 §	Don Hannah	The Wooden Hill	
1995 §	Maureen Hunter	Transit of Venus	
1996 §	Raymond Storey	The Glorious 12th	
1996 §	Gilles Maheu	The Dead Souls	
1996 §	Allan Stratton	Dracula: Nightmare of the Dead	
1997 §	Lynn Ahrens, Stephen Flaherty, Terrence McNally	Ragtime	
1997 §	John Caird, Paul Gordon	Jane Eyre	
1997 §	Maureen Hunter	Atlantis	
1997 §	Michael O'Brien	Oliver Twist, or The Street Boy's Progress	
1997 §	Carol Shields	Thirteen Hands	
1998	George F. Walker	Problem Child	
1998	David Gow	Cherry Docs	
1998	Jason Sherman	Patience	
1998	George F. Walker	The End Of Civilization	
1998	David Young	Inexpressible Island	
1999	Michael Healey	The Drawer Boy	
1999	Daniel Brooks, Guillermo Verdecchia	Insomnia	
1999	Michael Hollingsworth, Deanne Taylor	The Life and Times of Brian Mulroney	
1999	Soheil Parsa	Aurash	
1999	Jonathan Wilson	Kilt	

=== 2000s ===
Year	Playwright	Title	Ref
2000	Linda Griffiths	Alien Creature	
2000	Michel Tremblay (translation by Linda Gaboriau)	For the Pleasure of Seeing Her Again	
2000	Florence Gibson	Belle	
2000	Morwyn Brebner	Music for Contortionist	
2000	Jean Yoon	The Yoko Ono Project	
2001	Kristen Thomson	I, Claudia	
2001	Alex Bulmer	Smudge	
2001	Ronnie Burkett	Happy	
2001	Adam Pettle	Zadie's Shoes	
2001	Betty Quan	Ghost Train	
2002	Michael Healey	Plan B	
2002	Carole Fréchette,	Elisa's Skin	
2002	Daniel MacIvor	You Are Here	
2002	Alex Poch-Goldin	This Hotel	
2002	Djanet Sears	The Adventures of a Black Girl in Search of God	
2003	Morris Panych	Girl in the Goldfish Bowl	
2003	Chris Earle	Russell Hill	
2003	Matthew Edison	The Domino Heart	
2003	Sonja Mills	The Danish Play	
2003	Adam Pettle	Therac 25	
2004	Michael Hollingsworth	Confederation	
2004	Trey Anthony	da kink in my hair	
2004	Marjorie Chan	China Doll	
2004	Peter Froehlich	Simpl	
2004	Michael O'Brien	Restitution: An Irish-Canadian Rhapsody	
2005	John Mighton	Half Life	
2005	Claudia Dey	Trout Stanley	
2005	Keira Loughran	Little Dragon	
2005	Rick Miller, Daniel Brooks	Bigger Than Jesus	
2005	David S. Young	No Great Mischief	
2006	d'bi young	blood.claat - one woman story	
2006	Ronnie Burkett	10 Days on Earth	
2006	Rosa Labordé	Léo	
2006	Niki Landau	Territories	
2006	Colombe Demers, Ann-Marie Kerr, Liisa Repo-Martell	The Long Valley	
2007	Michael Healey	Generous	
2007	Damien Atkins	Lucy	
2007	Michael Hollingsworth	The Saskatchewan Rebellion	
2007	Mike McPhaden	Noble Parasites	
2007	Morris Panych	What Lies Before Us	
2008	Judith Thompson	The Palace of the End	
2008	Brendan Gall	Alias Godot	
2008	Hannah Moscovitch	East of Berlin	
2008	Hannah Moscovitch	Essay	
2008	The Second City	Tazed and Confused	
2009	Waawaate Fobister	Agokwe	
2009	Charlotte Corbeil-Coleman	Scratch	
2009	Kevin Loring	Where the Blood Mixes	
2009	Joan MacLeod	Another Home Invasion	
2009	Andrew Moodie	Toronto the Good	

=== 2010s ===
Year	Playwright	Title	Ref
2010	Michael Healey	Courageous	
2010	Carmen Aguirre	Refugee Hotel	
2010	Anusree Roy	Letters to My Grandma	
2010	Erin Shields	If We Were Birds	
2010	Judith Thompson	Such Creatures	
2011	Anusree Roy	Brothel #9	
2011	Maja Ardal	The Cure for Everything	
2011	Brendan Gall	Wide Awake Hearts	
2011	Andrew Kushnir	The Middle Place	
2011	Roland Schimmelpfennig	Peggy Pickit Sees the Face of God - The Africa Trilogy	
2012	Pamela Mala Sinha	Crash	
2012	Ins Choi	Kim's Convenience	
2012	Erin Fleck	Those Who Can't Do	
2012	Tim Supple, Hanan al-Shaykh	One Thousand and One Nights	
2012	Evan Webber	Ajax & Little Iliad	
2013	Kristen Thomson	Someone Else	
2013	Melody Johnson	Miss Caledonia	
2013	Daniel MacIvor	Arigato, Tokyo	
2013	Hannah Moscovitch	Little One	
2013	Tawiah M'carthy	Obaaberima	
2014	Vern Thiessen	Of Human Bondage	
2014	Damien Atkins, Paul Dunn, Andrew Kushnir	The Gay Heritage Project	
2014	Sean Dixon	A God in Need of Help	
2014	Tim Luscombe	Pig	
2014	Marcus Youssef, James Long	Winners and Losers	
2015	Hannah Moscovitch	Infinity	
2015	Michael Hollingsworth	Trudeau and Lévesque	
2015	Maria Milisavljevic	Abyss	
2015	Carolyn Smart, Nicky Guadagni	Hooked	
2016	Kat Sandler	Mustard	
2016	Anna Chatterton, Evalyn Parry, Karin Randoja	Gertrude and Alice	
2016	Fabrizio Filippo	The Summoned	
2016	Jordan Tannahill	Botticelli in the Fire and Sunday in Sodom	
2016	Severn Thompson	Elle	
2017	Nick Green	Body Politic	
2017	Katherine Cullen, Britta Johnson	Stupidhead!	
2017	Diane Flacks	Unholy	
2017	Kristen Thomson	The Wedding Party	
2017	David Yee	Acquiesce	
2018	Evalyn Parry, Laakkuluk Williamson Bathory	Kiinalik: These Sharp Tools	
2018	Rose Napoli	Lo (or Dear Mr. Wells)	
2018	Jivesh Parasram	Take d Milk, Nah?	
2018	Kat Sandler	Bang Bang	
2018	Emil Sher	The Boy in the Moon	
2019	Charlotte Corbeil-Coleman	Guarded Girls	
2019	Yolanda Bonnell	Bug	
2019	Lisa Karen Cox, Maggie Huculak, Raha Javanfar, Amy Nostbakken, Norah Sadava, Cheyenne Scott	Now You See Her	
2019	Kate Hennig	The Virgin Trial	
2019	Hannah Moscovitch, Maev Beaty, Anne-Marie Kerr	Secret Life of a Mother	

=== 2020s ===
Year	Playwright	Title	Ref
2020	Anosh Irani	Buffoon	
2020	Ronnie Burkett	Forget Me Not	
2020	Odile Gakire Katese	The Book of Life	
2020	Natasha Adiyana Morris	The Negroes Are Congregating	
2020	Kat Sandler	Yaga	
2021	No ceremony held due to the effect of the COVID-19 pandemic in Canada on theatre production in 2020.		
2022	Leanna Brodie, David Paquet	Wildfire	
2022	Cliff Cardinal	The Land Acknowledgement (As You Like It)	
2022	Chloé Hung	Three Women of Swatow	
2022	Rosa Labordé	Light	
2022	Jordan Tannahill	Draw Me Close	
2023	Kanika Ambrose	Our Place	
2023	Anosh Irani	Behind the Moon	
2023	Paolo Santalucia	Prodigal	
2023	Erin Shields	Queen Goneril	
2023	Tawiah M'carthy, Brad Cook	Maanomaa, My Brother	
2024	Michael Healey	The Master Plan	
2024	Seth Bockley, Jesse LaVercombe, Ahmed Moneka	King Gilgamesh and the Man of the Wild	
2024	Alex Bulmer	Perceptual Archaeology (or How to Travel Blind)	
2024	Frances Koncan	Women of the Fur Trade	
2024	Nick Green	Casey and Diana	
2025	Miriam Fernandes, Ravi Jain	Mahabharata: Part One: Karma: The Life We Inherit	
2025	Akosua Amo-Adem	Table for Two	
2025	Caleigh Crow	There is Violence and There is Righteous Violence and There is Death, or The Born-Again Crow	
2025	Miriam Fernandes, Ravi Jain	Mahabharata: Part Two: Dharma: The Life We Choose	
2025	Anusree Roy	Trident Moon	
2026	Nicolas Billon	The Neighbours	
2026	Kanika Ambrose	The Christmas Market	
2026	Michael Healey	Rogers v. Rogers	
2026	Natasha Mumba	Copperbelt	
2026	Anusree Roy	Through the Eyes of God	
