= Rose (play) =

1999 play by Tomson Highway

Rose is a play by Tomson Highway, which premiered on January 31, 1999, at the University of Toronto.

Set in Wasaychigan Hill, a fictional reserve on Manitoulin Island, Rose is the third play in Highway's 'Rez Cycle,' following The Rez Sisters and Dry Lips Oughta Move to Kapuskasing. While The Rez Sisters portrays seven women who travel to "the biggest bingo in the world," and Dry Lips portrays seven men with conflicting business and religious interests, Rose features male and female characters from the first two plays, along with several additional characters, all of whom are preparing for the opening of "the biggest casino in the world."

"Rose" had its world professional premiere at the National Arts Centre in Ottawa, Canada, from March 25 to April 4, 2026.
