= Damien Atkins =

Canadian actor and playwright

- Born: Australia
- Education: MacEwan University
- Occupations: actor, playwright
- Writing career
- Years active: 1989–present
- Notable works: Lucy; We Are Not Alone; Good Mother; The Gay Heritage Project
- Website: damienatkins.workbooklive.com

Damien Atkins is a Canadian actor and playwright.

== Early life and education ==
Born in Australia and raised in St. Albert, Alberta, Atkins graduated from the musical theatre program at Grant MacEwan College and moved to Toronto after appearing in a Canadian Stage production of Into the Woods. At the age of five, he was cast in the first show presented by the St. Albert Children's Theatre: The Hobbit. He continued performing with SACT (in almost 40 shows) until he was 16. His family subsequently moved to Saskatoon, Saskatchewan, where he attended high school at Marion Graham Collegiate.

== Career ==
=== Playwriting ===
His first play, miss chatelaine, was staged at Theatre Passe-Muraille following a successful run at the Edmonton Fringe Festival The following year his musical cabaret show Real Live Girl was workshopped at Buddies in Bad Times, before having its official premiere that season. In 2001, he premiered Good Mother, starring Seana McKenna, at the Stratford Festival of Canada.

Good Mother won the Elliott Hayes Playwright Development Award from the Stratford Festival and the Prism International Prize from the University of British Columbia, and made Atkins the youngest playwright ever to have a new work staged at the Stratford Festival. Real Live Girl was later restaged by Buddies in 2003 and went on tour in 2004. He performed a one-act version of the piece for a Buddies fundraiser in 2010.

His fourth play, Lucy, premiered at Canadian Stage in March 2007, and was later staged at the Ensemble Studio Theatre in New York City in October 2007.

His fifth play, The Mill, Part Four: Ash, was the fourth part of The Mill tetralogy produced by theatrefront. The other writers involved in The Mill were Matthew MacFadzean, Hannah Moscovitch and Tara Beagan.

In 2013, Buddies in Bad Times staged The Gay Heritage Project, a play in which Atkins and cocreators Andrew Kushnir and Paul Dunn dramatized various scenes investigating the notion of a heritage that is particular to gay people.

In February 2015, Atkins premiered his newest solo show, We Are Not Alone, at the Segal Centre in Montreal, in a co-production between The Segal Centre and Toronto's Crow's Theatre.

=== Acting ===
In addition to some of his own plays, Atkins has appeared in many productions across Canada and the U.S. Selected credits include: Hosanna, The Heidi Chronicles, A Doll's House, I Am My Own Wife, The Retreat From Moscow, Mr. Burns, A Post-Electric Play, Sextet, Beatrice & Virgil, Unidentified Human Remains..., Someone Else, Seussical, Frost/Nixon, 7 Stories, The Way of the World, London Road, Angels in America, Shopping and Fucking, Hamlet, Fiddler on the Roof, The Alchemist, Macbeth, The Tempest, Titus Andronicus, Elizabeth Rex, Our Country's Good and The Chocolate Soldier.

His roles in film and television have included Angel Square, The Art of Woo, Children of My Heart, Take This Waltz, Slings and Arrows and The Matthew Shepard Story.

== Awards and nominations ==
Atkins has been nominated for ten Dora Mavor Moore Awards for acting and writing, winning four.

He won two Doras in 2002, in the categories of Best New Musical and Outstanding Male Performance in a Musical, for Real Live Girl.

He was nominated for the Dora for Outstanding New Play, but did not win, in 2007 for Lucy.

He was nominated for a Dora for Best Actor in a Musical in 2011 for Seussical.

In 2014, he was nominated for five Doras in one evening (Best Actor in a Play for Angels in America: Perestroika, Best Actor in a Musical for London Road, Best Ensemble for The Gay Heritage Project, Best New Play (with Andrew Kushnir and Paul Dunn) for The Gay Heritage Project and Best Ensemble of a Musical for London Road). He won both Doras for London Road.

That same year he won the Toronto Theatre Critics Award for Best Actor for Angels in America.

He has also been nominated for Montreal's Masque Award (Best Actor for The Glass Menagerie) MECCA award (Best Actor for Geometry in Venice) and META awards (Best Actor and Best New Play for We Are Not Alone).

In 2017, Atkins won the Jessie Richardson Award for Best Actor for Angels in America (Arts Club, Vancouver).

== Filmography ==
=== Film ===
Year	Title	Role	Notes
1990	The Comic Book Christmas Caper	Lester Lister	
2001	The Art of Woo	Jonathan Peters	
2004	Zeyda and the Hitman	Fisk	
2011	Take This Waltz	Aquafit Instructor	

=== Television ===
Year	Title	Role	Notes
1989	The Ray Bradbury Theater	Peter Hadley	Episode: "The Veldt"
1996	Psi Factor	Delivery Boy	Episode: "Reptilian Revenge/Ghostly Voices"
2000	Children of My Heart	Niles Duffy	Television film
2001	I Was a Rat	Walter	3 episodes
2002	The Matthew Shepard Story	Donny	Television film
2002	Odyssey 5	Junior Executive	Episode: "Time Out of Mind"
2004	The Eleventh Hour	Jimmy	Episode: "Bedfellas"
2005	Puppets Who Kill	The Assistant Director	Episode: "Buttons the Dresser"
2005	Our Fathers	Young Geoghan	Television film
2006	Slings and Arrows	Nigel Harrison	4 episodes
2008	MVP	Photographer's Assistant	Episode: "The Code"
2009	The Listener	Gerald Cooper	Episode: "My Sister's Keeper"
2010	Wingin' It	Franz	Episode: "Hold the Dressing"
2011	Committed	Herbert	Television film
2011	Desperately Seeking Santa	Choreographer	Television film
2014	Murdoch Mysteries	Owen Hume	Episode: "The Murdoch Appreciation Society"
2014	Saving Hope	Teddy	Episode: "The Heartbreak Kid"
2026	The Vampire Lestat	Magnus	Episode: "Toronto"
