= Gregory Prest =

Canadian actor, playwright and theatre director

Gregory Prest is a Canadian actor, playwright and theatre director. He is most noted for his role as Simon in the comedy television series Pillow Talk, for which he and his castmates received an ensemble nomination for Best Performance in a Variety or Sketch Comedy Program or Series at the 11th Canadian Screen Awards in 2023, and as a Dora Mavor Moore Award winner for Best Direction in a Musical in 2019 for Soulpepper's musical Rose.

In 2012, he collaborated with Ins Choi, Raquel Duffy, Ken MacKenzie and Mike Ross on a theatrical adaptation of Dennis Lee's children's poetry book Alligator Pie, for which they received ensemble Dora nominations for Outstanding New Play and Outstanding Direction in the Theatre for Young Audiences division in 2013. He has also been a two-time Dora nominee as an actor, receiving nods for Best Leading Actor, General Theatre in 2014 for Of Human Bondage at Soulpepper, and Best Actor in a Featured Performance in 2022 for the Mirvish Productions staging of Harry Potter and the Cursed Child.

His credits as a director have included productions of Anita Majumdar's Fish Eyes, Simon Stephens's Punk Rock, Michel Tremblay's Hosanna, and Wendy Wasserstein's The Heidi Chronicles.

He is in a relationship with actor Paolo Santalucia, who was one of his costars in Pillow Talk. The couple first became known for their performances in Soulpepper Theatre's 2018 production of Mark Crawford's Bed and Breakfast, in which Santalucia and Prest played all 22 of the play's characters themselves.
