= Jawbreaker =

Jawbreaker may refer to:

- Gobstopper, a hard candy with multiple layers

== Arts and entertainment ==
- Jawbreakers (album), an album by Eddie "Lockjaw" Davis and Harry "Sweets" Edison
- Jawbreaker (band), an American rock band
- Jawbreakers (duo)
- Jawbreaker (film), a 1999 American film
- Jawbreaker (Transformers), several fictional characters in the Transformers universes
- Jawbreaker (TV series), a Canadian talk show
- Jawbreaker (video game), a 1981 Pac-Man clone
- Jawbreaker (Windows Mobile game), a 2003 video game
- "Jawbreaker", a song by 5 Seconds of Summer from Everyone's a Star!
- "Jawbreaker", a song by The Dead Weather from Sea of Cowards
- "Jawbreaker", a song by Judas Priest from Defenders of the Faith
- "Jawbreaker", a song by Machine Gun Kelly (musician)

== Military and government ==
- Jawbreaker, the code name for the CIA team that operated in Afghanistan in September 2001
- Jawbreaker: The Attack on bin Laden and al-Qaeda, a book by Gary Berntsen

== See also ==
- Ed, Edd n Eddy: Jawbreakers!, a 2003 video game
