= East of Berlin =

- Written by: Hannah Moscovitch

Premiere
- Date premiered: October 16, 2007
- Place premiered: Tarragon Theatre, Toronto, Canada

East of Berlin is a play by Hannah Moscovitch. It premiered in 2007 at Tarragon Theatre.

== Synopsis ==
East of Berlin follows Rudi, a young man living in Paraguay with his German family. Rudi's friend, Hermann, reveals that Rudi's father was an SS doctor at Auschwitz. Rudi flees to Berlin where he meets and falls in love with Sarah, whose mother survived Auschwitz.

== Development ==
Moscovitch wrote East of Berlin while a member of Tarragon Theatre's 2006-2007 Playwrights Unit and had originally pitched the script to Tarragon's artistic director, Richard Rose, as a comedy. It was her first full-length play. Moscovitch was influenced by the books Born Guilty by Peter Sichrovsky and Legacy of Silence by Dan Bar-On.

== Productions ==
East of Berlin premiered in 2007 at Tarragon Theatre's Extra Space in Toronto, directed by Alisa Palmer and starring Brendan Gall as Rudi, Paul Dunn as Hermann, and Diana Donnelly as Sarah. The production featured set and costume design from Camellia Koo, lighting design by Michael Walton, and sound design by John Gzowski. In 2008, it was produced by Alberta Theatre Projects in Calgary, under the direction of Bob White. The next season, the Tarragon production was remounted at Tarragon and toured to Touchstone Theatre in Vancouver, and Edmonton's Theatre Network.

In 2009, 2b Theatre Company in Halifax staged East of Berlin, under the direction of Christian Barry and starring David Patrick Flemming as Rudi. In 2011, East of Berlin played in double bill with Moscovitch's The Russian Play at Signal Ensemble Theatre in Chicago, directed by Ronan Marra. Actors Billy Fenderson (Rudi/Kostya), Melanie Keller (Sarah), Tom McGrath (Hermann) performed both plays. In 2012, it was staged by the Great Canadian Theatre Company in Ottawa.

The play made its UK premiere in 2014 at Southwark Playhouse in London, directed by Blythe Stewart and starring Jordan McCurrach as Rudi. It was staged in 2016 at the Project Arts Centre in Dublin, starring Colin Campbell as Rudi under the direction of Lee Wilson.

== Awards and nominations ==
The 2007 premiere production won the 2008 Dora Mavor Moore Award for Outstanding Set Design for Camellia Koo and was nominated for a Dora Mavor Moore Award for Outstanding New Play. East of Berlin was nominated for the Governor General's Award for English-language drama in 2009.
