= Yvette Nolan =

Canadian Algonquin playwright, director, and actor

- Born: Yvette Nolan; 1961 (age 64–65); Prince Albert, Saskatchewan, Canada
- Occupations: Playwright, director, educator

Yvette Nolan (born 1961) is a Canadian playwright, director, actor, and educator based out of Saskatchewan, Canada. She was born in Prince Albert, Saskatchewan. She has contributed significantly to the creation and performance of Indigenous theatre in Canada.

== Early life ==
Nolan was born in Prince Albert, Saskatchewan, to an Algonquin mother and an Irish immigrant father. She was raised in Winnipeg, Manitoba and graduated with Bachelor of Arts from the University of Manitoba. In 2024, she completed a Master of Public Policy at the Johnson Shoyama Graduate School of Public Policy in Saskatchewan.

Her commitment to Indigenous and feminist live art is attributed to the first time saw an Indigenous character on stage during Royal Winnipeg Ballet's adaptation of The Ecstasy of Rita Joe.

== Career ==
In 1990, she started playwright career at the Winnipeg Fringe Festival with premier of her play, Blade. It was later remounted at both the Best of the Fringe (1990) and Women in View Festival (1992). She has worked at various theatre companies throughout Canada, including the Agassiz Theatre, the Manitoba Theatre Centre, Nakai Theatre in Whitehorse, and Native Earth Performing Arts, a theatre company based in Ontario province.

As a director, she has contributed significantly to the development of Aboriginal theatre within Canada. She has directed plays by George Ryga (The Ecstasy of Rita Joe), Turtle Gals Performance Ensemble (The Only Good Indian), Marie Clements (Tombs of the Vanishing Indian and The Unnatural and Accidental Women), Kenneth T. Williams (Café Daughter and In Care), and Melanie J. Murray (A Very Polite Genocide).

From 1998 until 2001, she was also president of the Playwrights Guild of Canada. She was the artistic director of Native Earth Performing Arts from 2003 to 2010, was president of the Indigenous Performing Arts Alliance, and has sat on the boards of the Saskatchewan Arts Alliance and the Saskatchewan Association of Theatre Professionals. In 2010 and 2011, she hosted Matariki Development Festival in New Zealand.

She is an Artistic Associate at Signal Theatre and co-director with Michael Greyeyes of a dance opera (Bearing) at the 2017 Luminato Festival. She also directed (Nôhkom) with Signal Theatre. In 2017, she was awarded an Honorary Lifetime Membership to the CATR / ACRT.

In 2021, she taught at the Canadian College of the Performing Arts in Victoria, British Columbia. In the same year, she was awarded the Gascon-Thomas Lifetime Achievement Award from the National Theatre School of Canada. In 2022, she was the Interim Co-Artistic Director along with Skye Brandon at Shakespeare On The Saskatchewan. She is a Senior Fellow at Massey College in Toronto.

Her play, The Unplugging, received two productions in 2023 at the Belfry Theatre in the city of Victoria in British Columbia and the Great Canadian Theatre Company in Ottawa. It was also produced in 2025 by Burnt Thicket Theatre in Sasaktoon, Canada. Her work with Donna-Michelle St. Bernard continued with The First Stone at Buddies in Bad Times in 2022 and at Great Canadian Theatre Company in 2023.

She directed Frances Koncan's Women Of The Fur Trade at the Stratford Festival in 2023. as well as at the Globe Theatre in Regina. From 2016–2022, she was the Company Dramaturge at Sum Theatre in Saskatoon.

== Writer-in-Residence ==
- 1996: 1st writer-in-residence at Brandon University
- 2011 (nine-month term): Saskatoon Library
- 2018: McGill University

== Playwright-in-residence ==
- 2009: National Arts Centre and Mount Royal College
- 2011 (nine-month term): University of Regina

== Plays ==
- A Marginal Man
- Annie Mae's Movement
- Blade
- Child
- Job's Wife
- Shakedown Shakespeare
- The Unplugging
- Donne In
- Owen (radio play)
- Toronto Rex
- Ham and the Ram
- Prophecy
- Alaska
- from thine eyes
- Henry IV Pt 1: (adaptation)
- Hilda Blake (libretto)
- The Birds: (adaptation)
- Scattering Jake
- Finish Line
- Video
- What Befalls The Earth

== Editor ==
Performing Indigeneity: with Ric Knowles, Playwrights Canada Press, 2016 Beyond The Pale: Refractions: Solo with Donna-Michelle St. Bernard, Playwrights Canada Press

== Culture Studies ==
Medicine Shows: Indigenous Performance Culture, Playwrights Canada Press, 2015

== Director ==
- The Unnatural and Accidental Women for Native Earth Performing Arts 2004.
- Death of a Chief for Native Earth Performing Arts Weesageechak 2005
- The Triple Truth for Turtle Gals 2005
- Annie Mae's Movement for Native Earth Performing Arts 2006
- The Only Good Indian for Turtle Gals Performance Ensemble 2007
- A Very Polite Genocide Native Earth Performing Arts 2008
- Death of a Chief for Native Earth Performing Arts 2008
- Salt Baby for Native Earth Performing Arts 2009, Globe Theatre, Regina 2016, National tour 2016-2017
- The Ecstasy of Rita Joe for National Arts Centre/Western Canada Theatre 2009
- Café Daughter for Gwaandak Theatre (Yukon) 2011
- Tombs of the Vanishing Indian for Native Earth Performing Arts 2011
- In Care by Kenneth T. Williams, Gordon Tootoosis Nikaniwin Theatre, October 2016
- Bearing co-director with Michael Greyeyes, dramaturge, Signal Theatre: Luminato 2017
- Map Of The Land, Map Of The Stars Gwaandak Theatre, 2017
- The Piano Teacher Arts Club, Vancouver, BC 2017
- The Penelopiad Ferre Play Theatre, Persephone Theatre, Saskatoon 2017
- Elemental Embrace Theatre/MuD Collective at Live Five, Saskatoon 2019
- The Unplugging at New Native Theatre, Minneapolis 2020
- Wreckonciliation Amplified Opera, Toronto 2022
- The First Stone at Great Canadian Theatre Company, Ottawa 2023

== Awards ==
- John Hirsch Award for Most Promising New Writer (nomination), 1995.
- James Buller Award for Playwrighting from the Centre for Indigenous Theatre (nomination), 1997.
- Maggie Bassett Award for service to the theatre community, 2007.
- City of Toronto's Aboriginal Affairs Award, 2008.
- George Luscombe Award for mentorship in professional theatre, 2011.
- Bob Couchman Award for direction (for Café Daughter by Kenneth T Williams (Gwaandak Theatre)).
- Jessie Richardson Award for Outstanding Original Script, 2013 (for The Unplugging).
- Mallory Gilbert Leadership Award, 2014.
- Woman Of Distinction (nomination) - YWCA Saskatoon, 2017
- Dora Mavor Moore Award for Shanawdithit in 2020.
- Gina Wilkinson Prize, 2021
- Gascon-Thomas Lifetime Achievement Award, 2021
