= Kiss of the Fur Queen =

1998 novel by Tomson Highway

- Author: Tomson Highway
- Translator: Robert Dickson (French); Thomas Bauer (German)
- Language: English
- Genre: novel
- Published: 1998 (Doubleday Canada); 2001 (Frederking & Thaler) (German); 2004 (Prise de parole) (French)
- Publication place: Canada
- ISBN: 9780385256520

Kiss of the Fur Queen is a novel by Tomson Highway, first published by Doubleday Canada in September 1998.

The novel's main characters are Champion and Ooneemeetoo Okimasis, two young Cree brothers from Eemanipiteepitat in northern Manitoba who are taken from their family and sent to a residential school. Their language is forbidden, their names are changed to Jeremiah and Gabriel, and the boys are sexually abused by priests. However, a wily trickster figure, the Fur Queen, watches over the boys as they fulfill their destiny to become artists.

The novel, a fictionalized account of the real-life childhood of Tomson Highway and his brother René, was a nominee for the Canadian Booksellers Association Libris Award and the Books in Canada First Novel Award in 1998.

Francophone Ontarian poet and academic Robert Dickson translated the novel into French, under the title Champion et Ooneemeetoo, which was published by Prise de parole in 2004. The German edition Der Kuss der Pelzkönigin. Ein indianischer Lebensweg was translated by Thomas Bauer and published in 2001 by Frederking & Thaler (Munich).

Under the title Le Baiser de la reine blanche, the book was selected for the 2024 edition of Le Combat des livres, where it was defended by Jocelyn Sioui.

== Plot summary ==
Kiss of the Fur Queen begins with the champion dog-sled racer Abraham Okimasis and the story of his two sons, Champion and Ooneemeetoo Okimasis from Eemanipiteepitat, Manitoba. Both brothers are taken from their families and sent to a residential school where they are unable to speak their language, forced to cut their hair, and renamed to Jeremiah and Gabriel. In their residential school experience, both brothers are physically and sexually abused at the hands of the priests which leads to Jeremiah's celibacy and Gabriel's inability to form successful relationships. The residential school is also the time that Gabriel meets the Fur Queen or better known as the trickster who watches over them throughout their lives.

When he returns from residential school, Jeremiah moves to Winnipeg to pursue his interests in music which acts as a coping strategy for his earlier abuse. He immerses himself fully in his musical pursuits which results in his further isolation and feelings of loneliness due to his lack of meaningful relationships and family connections. Gabriel decides to join his brother in Winnipeg to continue his passion for dance. He embraces his homosexuality at a time when it was not safe to do so publicly, and self-medicates with drugs and alcohol. He turns to prostitution and endures vivid flashbacks of the abuse he suffered at the hands of the priests. Both brothers have troubles reconciling their two identities and this leads them to reject their Native identity and embrace the dominant culture.

== Themes ==
There are many themes at play in this novel. There is the theme of the trickster, an element found throughout native storytelling and fiction. In this case the trickster appears in the lives of both Abraham, who is the father of the boys, and Gabriel and Jeremiah. The trickster appears in times of great importance for the characters and is a playful figure, in contrast to the stern vengeful god that the boys are introduced to in school. Another theme found in this novel is the devastating effects of colonization on Indigenous people. Gabriel and Jeremiah are sent to residential school where they are forced to speak English, and their own Cree culture and language is demonized. Both boys are traumatized by their experiences at residential school and face issues regarding identity growing up. Reconciliation is also a strong theme found in this work. Both Gabriel and Jeremiah have to find their own way to heal from their traumatic experiences at residential school.
