= Catherine Cullen (disambiguation) =

Catherine Cullen is a member of the New Mexico House of Representatives.

Catherine Cullen may also refer to:

- Catherine Cullen (British politician), Welsh Member of the Senedd
- Catherine Cullen (High Peak), English candidate for the Parliament of the United Kingdom

== See also ==
- Katharine Cullen, Australian actress
- Katherine Cullen, American biologist
