= Paolo Santalucia =

Paolo Santalucia is a Canadian actor and playwright. He is most noted for his 2022 play Prodigal, which was a Dora Mavor Moore Award nominee for Best Original Play (General Theatre) in 2023, and his role as J.P. in the comedy television series Pillow Talk, for which he and his castmates received an ensemble nomination for Best Performance in a Variety or Sketch Comedy Program or Series at the 11th Canadian Screen Awards in 2023.

He is in a relationship with actor Gregory Prest, who was one of his costars in Pillow Talk. The couple first became known for their performances in Soulpepper Theatre's 2018 production of Mark Crawford's Bed and Breakfast, in which Santalucia and Prest played all 22 of the play's characters themselves.
