= Native American drama =

Native American drama refers to theatrical works written and performed by Indigenous peoples of North America, encompassing a wide range of forms from traditional ceremonial performances to contemporary stage plays, multimedia works, and political satire. Rooted in oral storytelling traditions and communal rituals, Native drama often engages themes of identity, land, memory, survivance, and resistance to colonial narratives. While Indigenous communities have practiced performative storytelling for centuries, Native-authored written plays began to emerge publicly in the late 19th century, most notably with Gowongo Mohawk’s Wep-Ton-No-Mah (1892). The genre expanded significantly in the 20th century, with landmark contributions by playwrights such as Lynn Riggs, Hanay Geiogamah, and Tomson Highway, and continues to evolve in the 21st century through artists like Marie Clements and LeAnne Howe. Despite a growing body of published and unpublished work, Native American drama remains underrepresented in mainstream scholarship and theatrical institutions.

== Notable plays ==
Native American and First Nations plays vary widely in form and tone—from ceremonial reenactments to political satire and multimedia productions. While traditional oral narratives form the foundation of Indigenous storytelling, contemporary Native drama transforms these inherited forms into published theatrical scripts and public performances.

The earliest known Native-authored play is Wep-Ton-No-Mah (1892) by Seneca actress and playwright Gowongo Mohawk, a dramatic work performed in the United Kingdom. Other important early works include dramatic readings by Mohawk poet Emily Pauline Johnson, whose performances in the 1890s blurred the boundaries between poetry, storytelling, and theatrical presence.

More recent landmark plays include:

The Ecstasy of Rita Joe (1970) by George Ryga — Though not Indigenous himself, Ryga’s play is one of the first major works to depict Indigenous urban displacement. The casting of Margo Kane (Saulteaux/Cree/Blackfoot) in the title role in 1981 marked a turning point in Indigenous representation on stage.

Body Indian and 49 by Hanay Geiogamah — Short, episodic plays that explore addiction, family breakdown, and cultural resilience through dark humor and ritual structure.

Indian Radio Days (1993) by LeAnne Howe and Roxy Gordon — A satirical collage critiquing the way mainstream media distorts Native identity, using the framework of a radio broadcast.

The Woman Who Was a Red Deer Dressed for the Deer Dance (1995) by Diane Glancy — A lyrical meditation on spirituality, gender, and ceremonial memory, often crossing between poetry and performance.

Sneaky and The Star Quilter by William S. Yellow Robe Jr. — Realist dramas set in reservation communities that tackle youth alienation, theft, family trauma, and the reclamation of Indigenous art forms.

Burning Vision (2002) by Métis playwright Marie Clements — A multimedia, nonlinear narrative about uranium mining on Dene land and its global consequences, linking Indigenous land dispossession to environmental catastrophe.

== Notable playwrights ==
Native American and First Nations playwrights come from diverse tribal, geographic, and aesthetic backgrounds, but their work consistently reflects concerns with land, identity, language, memory, and survivance.

Gowongo Mohawk (Seneca)

- An actress and playwright, Mohawk’s ''Wep-Ton-No-Mah'' (1892) is the earliest recorded Native-authored dramatic work. Her career marks a rare case of 19th-century Indigenous authorship and international performance.

Emily Pauline Johnson (Mohawk/English)

- Known for fusing oral storytelling with performative poetry, Johnson’s late 19th-century tours helped popularize Indigenous narratives and feminine identity through dramatic readings.

Lynn Riggs (Cherokee)

- Best known for ''Green Grow the Lilacs'' (basis for Rodgers and Hammerstein’s ''Oklahoma!''), Riggs brought Native themes into 20th-century American theater, though often through mixed-race or allegorical figures.

Hanay Geiogamah (Kiowa/Delaware)

- Founder of the American Indian Theater Ensemble, Geiogamah’s plays like ''Body Indian'' and ''49'' ushered in the era of Native-authored, Native-acted contemporary drama in the 1970s.

Tomson Highway (Cree)

- A prolific Canadian playwright and musician, Highway’s works blend Cree mythology, queerness, and satire. He was a founding member of Native Earth Performing Arts, where he served as musical director and playwright.

Diane Glancy (Cherokee)

- Known for her poetic and fragmentary style, Glancy’s work explores intersections of Christian faith, Native tradition, and feminist voice. Her plays often blur genres and theatrical forms.

LeAnne Howe (Choctaw)

- A playwright, poet, and scholar, Howe is a leading figure in Indigenous performance studies. Her co-authored work ''Indian Radio Days'' is widely taught as a model of satire and media critique.

Marie Clements (Métis)

- Clements’s plays incorporate dance, film, and historical reconstruction. ''Burning Vision'' and ''The Unnatural and Accidental Women'' confront violence against Indigenous communities through nonlinear narrative and surrealist staging.

William S. Yellow Robe Jr. (Assiniboine)

- His prolific career includes dozens of plays that center reservation life, displacement, and generational tension. A teacher and advocate for Indigenous arts, Yellow Robe’s influence is widely recognized in Native theater circles.

== History ==
Early Native American culture was rich with ceremonies, rituals and storytelling. These ceremonies had theatrical elements, but whether or not these traditions are early forms of modern-day theatre or are independent cultural practices is not clear. According to Henry Schafer, “A variety of rituals and ceremonies could be considered early forms of theatre…. Others see this interpretation as a devaluation of sacred rituals as simply a pre-form of secular theatre.”

One of the first practitioners of Native theatre was Seneca playwright and actress Gowongo Mohawk (1860-1924), whose 1892 play, Wep-Ton-No-Mah, was performed in the United Kingdom.

Mohawk poet Emily Pauline Johnson (1861-1913) performed dramatic readings of her poems in the 1890s.

The Sun Dance Opera, the first opera composed by a Native American was composed by Zitkala-Sa in 1913.

Other early contributors to the Native Canadian theatre scene included a non-native named Anthony Walsh who directed the “Can-Oos-Sez Skay-loo Drama Group,” from 1934 to 1942, and Emily General (Cayuga), who established a series of annual plays to be performed at the Great Pine Forest Theatre on the Six Nations Reserve in 1949. In 1950, two non-Natives, Frank Morrison and Cecil West wrote and directed the opera Tzinquaw: The Thunderbird and the Killer Whale, which premiered in Duncan, BC, performed by purely Native people. In Canada, playwrights James Reaney, John Herbert, and George Ryga made their contribution to Native theatre with The Ecstasy of Rita Joe (1970). Margo Kane (Saulteaux/Cree/Blackfoot) joined the production of The Ecstasy of Rita Joe in 1978 and became the first Native American actor to play the part of Rita Joe in 1981.

According to Henry Schafer, 1985-1995 was the “Golden Age” of Native theater. Many Native theatre companies and playwrights emerged during this period. Tomson Highway (Cree) joined the Native Earth Performing Arts (NEPA), starting as a musical director and performer. In 1985, Ondinnok Mythological Theatre was founded in Montreal by French-speaking Native playwright Yves Sioui Durand. Other Native theatre companies that emerged during this period were: Tunooniq Theater, Awasikan Theatre, Urban Shaman and Native Youth Theatre R-Street Vision. In 1987, on the Hobbema Reserve, Four Winds Theatre Group was founded by Darrel and Lori Wildcat (Cree), along with cofounders Rosa and Melvin John. After the Four Winds Theatre Group closed in 1991, the Johns went on to form Kehewin Native Performance Resource Network (KNPRN). “KNPRN concentrates on traditional theatre, storytelling, and dance and works with young people, touring all over Canada and internationally.” (1) In 1992, Margo Kane founded Full Circle: First Nations Performance in British Columbia. Two of the most recent Native theatre companies to emerge are Saskatchewan Native Theatre Company (1999) and Red Sky Performance in Toronto (2000). From 1995 to present day Native Theatre has struggled to maintain its size and popularity. One major issue the Native theatre scene faced was lack of funding. Although some of the theatre companies closed and some still struggle to survive, the Native theatre scene is continuing to develop and mature. “Even though Native theatre is a relatively recent phenomenon in Canada, it is by now an integral part of the Canadian cultural landscape. It takes on many forms and draws from various traditions like storytelling, European theatre, traditional dance, and multimedia. It resists any clear-cut definition and is constantly exploring new forms of expression.”

The stories that inspire Native American theatre have been around for hundreds of years, but did not gain formal recognition by colonial America. This lack of recognition lasted until the 1930s when Lynn Riggs, a playwright of Cherokee descent, brought Native Theatre into the spotlight through the Six Nations Reserve Forest Theatre. Through these events, Native theatre has been introduced to mainstream society and contemporary Native American theater was born. Canadian playwright Drew Hayden Taylor explains how Native American theatre has been around for centuries, but has only recently been highlighted in North American mainstream media: “Native theatre is much older than the scant few years. It is as old as this country, as old as the people who have been here for thousands of years, as old as the stories that are still told today. It is merely the presentation that has changed.”

Since the creation of contemporary Native American theater, there have been plays available for publishing: “There are currently over 250 published and far over 600 unpublished plays by some 250 Native American and First Nations playwrights and theatre groups on the North American market.” These numbers do not include the plays inside the North American Indian Drama collection as of 2006. Even though there is a large amount of plays available for production or analysis, the Native American drama genre is often overlooked by not only the general public, but also by universities. Shari Huhndorf states “drama remains the most overlooked genre in Native American literature.” There needs to be more research and appreciation for Native American drama and its background. The lack of connection between plays from reservations and urban areas needs to improve in order for there to be more information from different angles and perspectives presented through dramatic literature. This can provide increased appreciation for Native American Theatre.

Contemporary Native American theater began in the 20th century and developed from oral culture and literature. These stories were used to “educate, entertain, and preserve” the new generations of the Native Americans. “However, indigenous theater was absent in Native writing during this period and the multiple reasons given for this nonexistence usually reflect a long history of silencing, discrimination, oppression, and displacement exercised in the genre.” These stories were usually told orally in a way accompanied by dancing, music, and other performances while the storyteller gets close to the audience to give them an immersive encounter of the story and the storyteller. These stories were usually exaggerated to give more drama for the audience. “This existence of this vibrant oral literature contrasts with the traditional Western conception that Native American cultures did not have history.” A non-Western historical record gave the misconception of Native Americans having no history before the arrival of European immigrants. Many Native American traditions and customs were suppressed due to colonization which prevented many from being able to tell their stories while they were oppressed. “The rise of the Civil Rights Movement during the 1960s and the 1970s also contributed to this reawakening of Native cultures since it appeared as a movement in which minorities demanded an end to discrimination and the right to speak for themselves.” This gave pride and encouraged many to seek inspiration from history and ancestral roots. Today there are many theater productions performing Native American works.

== Characteristics ==
According to Rolland Meinholtz, who is an “instructor and artistic director of drama and dance at the Institute of American Indian Arts,” youth must understand the struggles of Native American culture through contemporary plays. “They needed to know it, understand it, deal with it, struggle with it, hopefully integrate it, and lastly, build upon it.” In order to produce a play to convey a Native American themed message, you need dance, verse, drums, masks, facial painting. Even when the play consisted of non-Native Americans, Native American drama is all about the story and presentation, not about those who play the roles. “Nevertheless, there could be absolutely no question whose theatre we were witnessing. The spare setting, the drumming, the chanting and singing, the dancing, its episodic nature, and its wry point of view all proudly proclaimed this was Indian Theatre.” Coyote is a metaphor to describe the character of Native American theater. Native American Theater production that does not fit into western conventions cannot easily be categorized as comedy or tragedy. Thus, the coyote trickster represents the shape shifting nature of Native Theater itself. “For Indian theatre, there is no clear division of comedy and tragedy as found, for example, in ancient Greek drama. Comedy and tragedy are one: one extreme transforming into the other. Everything humans perceive as fixed is actually transitory and subject to transformation.” According to Meinholtz, Japanese Noh drama is a guide to achieving the spiritual goals he intended for Native American drama. Meinholtz is inspired by ancient Native American architecture to create contemporary theater spaces. “The Great Kivas were not the only examples of theatrical structures among Native Americans. The Zuni people build specifically designed rooms onto their houses in which to house the annual Shalako Ceremony.”

== Challenging stereotypes ==
Geraldine Keams (Navajo Nation TV and film actress) disrupts Native American stereotypes in her work. Keams has challenges stereotypes through writing and creating plays that include Native American history, such as Flight of The Army Worm, first performed in 1976 at Navajo Community College. Flight of the Army Worm is one of the first contemporary published plays that was done by a Native American Woman. Through Flight of The Army Worm, Keams was able to educate others about the Navajo Nation. “The character of the announcer gives the audience factual information about historical events, while through song, the Guitar Player urges revolution. This combination of modes of presentation aims to sharpen spectator’s analysis of the historical events they see and hear about. Keams combines Western and Indigenous pedagogies by moving the story from the intellectual account by the announcer to the personal account of Grandmother.”

The Native Theater Movement was built from several theaters, like the American Indian theatre Ensemble, Thunderbird Theater, and Spiderwoman Theater. These theater companies helped consolidate a nationwide Native Theatre movement across the United States and Canada. Native American drama had to fight against indifference and lack of knowledge on the part of some mainstream audiences. Native American playwrights write for a larger audiences who may not be aware that Native Americans are a significant demographic. This creates a double burden on the need to educate as well as to create drama. The “Three Miguel sisters" founded the Spiderwoman Theater (1975); their drama has raised the public profile of figures and themes of traditional Native American stories. As more anthologies of contemporary Native American drama are published, the variety and creativity of the contemporary scene has become more apparent. “Just the fact that you’re on the stage telling these stories is political, just the fact that you’re there…it is a public act claiming one's native identity is a political act.” The Native American Theatre Ensemble (1973) presented Native Americans on their own terms to combat stereotypical Indian misrepresentations.

Native American playwrights challenge centuries of stereotypes to create realistic characters conceived from their own personal experiences. The American Indian Theater Ensemble resolved to not only to rectify the cultural image of the Native American, but also to produce a body of drama intended primarily for the Indian community. “The purpose of making the company pan-tribal was to deconstruct stereotypes.” Hanay Geiogamah was active in the founding years of the American Indian Theatre Ensemble, which produced his one-act play Body Indian. Body Indian is pan-tribal work that demonstrates the problems Native American playwrights face in creating realistic drama based on contemporary Native American life. While Native people have been performing on the stages of the American theatre since the nineteenth century, at the turn of the twenty-first century, only a handful of articles on Native Theatre have been published, and most appeared in magazines rather than academic journals. Scholars in Canada embraced First Nations theatre more quickly, with much of the scholarship during the 1990s appearing in Canadian journals and published by Canadian presses. Now, twenty years later, Native and non-Native scholars seek to redefine the place of Indigenous theatre within the history of "American" theatre or, more accurately, the theatre of the Americas.

== Influence ==
Indigenous American cultures have been a major aspect of Chicano drama.

Chicano/playwrights have been inspired by Native American mythology and history through the use of symbolism and characters to represent Chicano/as, who are considered to be descendants of indigenous Mexico. Before the end of the Mexican War (1848), Mexico consisted of both Texas and California. The use of symbols in Chicano/a plays range from the use of characters being in the play on stage or “at other times the Indio is imagined through the use of Indigenous music, flutes, and drums.” These symbols provide information that is not easily seen and influence the action of the play and were influenced by the Chicano/an's indigenous roots.

In the play Day of the Swallows, Estela Portillo Trambley uses an Indigenous male character to represent the protagonist's Native American roots. The main character appears as the “noble savage” who represents the Indio in the play and Eduardo is paired with a contrasting character, Josefa, who is connected to her heritage and is traditionally feminine. Josefa's connection to her heritage in this play “is through images that only she can see and feel.” This play uses these visions as symbols that are influenced by their indigenous heritage. “Eduardo symbolizes the best and the worst of humanity in Josefa’s world, for he is Nature personified as Man.” Mummified Deer was written in 1984 by Luis Valdez. His character Cajeme, a deer dancer named after a famous Yaqui who fought against the Mexican government, is portrayed through different elements in the play. “Cajeme represents her inner thoughts, her fears, her Yaqui blood and being.” These plays were written to reconnect Chicanos with their Native American roots.

Estela Portillo Trambley and Luis Valdez were the most well-known authors of the Indigenous Chicano drama. They were the early proponents of bringing indigenous roots into Chicano/a plays. Trambley stated in an interview, “I hope…[Chicanos] still relate to seasons and to plants and to colors and to the wind, and to the Indian in them, or the element that is closest to the Earth.” Trambley is “regarded by most Chicano/critics and scholars as the author who inspired and opened the doors for all the Chicana writers who followed her.” Both of these playwrights used their own style while writing their individual plays. Trambley focused more on writing in the style of realism, which was more general with no indication of specific indigenous people, while Valdez wrote and produced in more specifics communities as well as by using “a surreal vision of the Chicano’s distorted postmodern, internally colonized condition.” Trambley stated in an interview, “I hope…[Chicanos] still relate to seasons and to plants and to colors and to the wind, and to the Indian in them, or the element that is closest to the Earth.”
