= Kwasi Thomas =

Canadian actor and stand-up comedian

Kwasi Thomas is a Canadian actor and stand-up comedian from Vancouver, British Columbia. He is best known for his television roles as Z-Wreck in Snowpiercer, and Thomas in Pillow Talk.

As a comedian he regularly performs in Vancouver and other communities in British Columbia, and released the comedy album Theatrical Release in 2021. He has also had stage roles, including in Pi Theatre's 2023 show Truth & Lies.

He and his castmates in Pillow Talk received ensemble nominations for Best Performance in a Variety or Sketch Comedy Program or Series at the 11th Canadian Screen Awards in 2023, and at the 12th Canadian Screen Awards in 2024.
