= The Real World? =

The Real World? is a 1987 play written by Canadian playwright Michel Tremblay. Originally written in French, under the title Le Vrai Monde?, it was later translated into English by John Van Burek and Bill Glassco.

It is about a young playwright named Claude, who writes his own mother and father into his first play. His parents, however, do not believe it to be an accurate representation of them, as we switch from his real parents to Claude's imagined reality as portrayed in his fictitious play.

The Real Wurld?, a Tron Theatre production of a translation of the play into contemporary Scots by Bill Findlay and Martin Bowman, was staged as part of Glasgow Mayfest in 1991.

The play received two Dora Mavor Moore Award nominations for Outstanding New Play, in 1988 for the original French version and in 1989 for the English translation.
