= Love and Human Remains =

- Promotional movie poster for the film
- Directed by: Denys Arcand
- Written by: Brad Fraser (play and screenplay)
- Produced by: Pierre Latour
- Starring: Thomas Gibson; Ruth Marshall; Cameron Bancroft; Mia Kirshner; Jo Vannicola; Matthew Ferguson; Rick Roberts
- Cinematography: Paul Sarossy
- Edited by: Alain Baril
- Music by: John McCarthy
- Distributed by: Sony Pictures Classics
- Release date: July 22, 1994 (UK)
- Running time: 100 minutes
- Country: Canada
- Language: English

Love and Human Remains is a 1993 Canadian film directed by Denys Arcand and based on Brad Fraser's stage play Unidentified Human Remains and the True Nature of Love. Fraser also wrote the screenplay for the film adaptation. The film version follows the story line of the original play fairly closely: a gay man and his heterosexual, female roommate (who sexually experiments by having sex with a lesbian) try to find love and sexual gratification in Edmonton, as a serial killer is loose in the city.

While the film was shot on location in Montreal, Quebec, the original stage play and the screenplay are both set in Edmonton, Alberta. There are attempts made in the dialogue, props and background film footage to identify the city as Edmonton, as in David's remark, "Let's order a Rosebowl pizza and discuss your sexual crises" (Rose Bowl Pizza was a well-known restaurant and bar in Edmonton). In another scene, the TV news reporter signs off from "CFR-" and gets cut off by the TV remote control before she can say "-N", the final call letter of Edmonton's CTV affiliate station. Sal's remark, "It's chicken night at Flash", is an allusion to Flashback, a long-gone Edmonton gay bar. There's also repeated use of a Sun newspaper (the Edmonton Sun is one of the city's major daily newspapers, although the city's name is not included in the masthead of the prop paper) and CBC-TV Canadian Football League footage of an Edmonton Eskimos game.

Fraser won a Genie Award for his adapted screenplay, while stars Mia Kirshner, Jo Vannicola and Matthew Ferguson received acting nominations.

In 2011, it was finally released on Region 1 DVD from Sony Pictures Classic's MOD service. It is also available in the UK on a Region 0 ("region-free") PAL DVD issued by Arrow Films.

== Cast ==
- Thomas Gibson as David Mc Millan
- Ruth Marshall as Candy
- Cameron Bancroft as Bernie
- Mia Kirshner as Benita
- Jo Vannicola as Jerri
- Matthew Ferguson as Kane
- Aidan Devine as Sal

== Reception ==
On the review aggregator website Rotten Tomatoes, 73% of 15 critics' reviews are positive.
