= Andrew Kushnir =

Canadian playwright and actor (born 1980)

- Born: 1980 (age 45–46); Montreal, Canada
- Occupations: actor, playwright

Andrew Kushnir (born 1980) is a Canadian playwright and actor. He is most noted as co-creator with Damien Atkins and Paul Dunn of The Gay Heritage Project, a theatrical show dramatizing aspects of LGBT history which was shortlisted for the Dora Mavor Moore Award for Outstanding New Play in 2014.

== Early life and education ==
Born in Montreal and raised between Montreal and Winnipeg, Kushnir is a second-generation Ukrainian-Canadian. His maternal grandfather, Peter Kushnir, at 17 served as a messenger for the Waffen SS Galicia Division (later the 1st Ukrainian Division) before escaping from a prisoner-of-war camp in Italy and immigrating to Canada. Peter became a master watchmaker who designed the Zenith Extra RR 56 railway pocket watch and served as a significant influence on Andrew's later work.

He was active in the Ukrainian Youth Association and performed in community pageants as a child. He attended high school in Winnipeg, where he received The Loran Scholarship Award. Kushnir later graduated from the University of Alberta's BFA Acting Conservatory.

== Career ==
The artistic director of Project Humanity, a theatrical organization that uses the arts to raise social awareness, Kushnir specializes in verbatim theatre, which addresses social issues by creating theatrical presentations from the real testimonies of people affected by them. His plays have included Captain Princess, foto, The Middle Place, Small Axe, Wormwood and Towards Youth: A Play on Radical Hope. Towards Youth was published in 2022 by University of Toronto Press.

Following his grandfather's death, Kushnir travelled across Europe and Ukraine to retrace his family's history. This research resulted in his documentary play The Division (formerly The Time Piece), which examines family mythology and historical memory.

In 2023, he directed Nick Green's Casey and Diana for the Stratford Festival.

== Personal life ==
Kushnir came out as gay at age 19.

== Activism ==
In 2022, following Russia's full-scale invasion of Ukraine, Kushnir founded the We Support LGBTQ Ukraine Fund in partnership with the Veritas Foundation. The fund provides direct humanitarian aid to queer and trans Ukrainians, specifically to those who are internally displaced or marginalized. By 2024, the fund had raised over $125,000 for Ukrainian NGOs such as KyivPride and Gender Zed.
