= Brad Fraser =

Canadian playwright (born 1959)

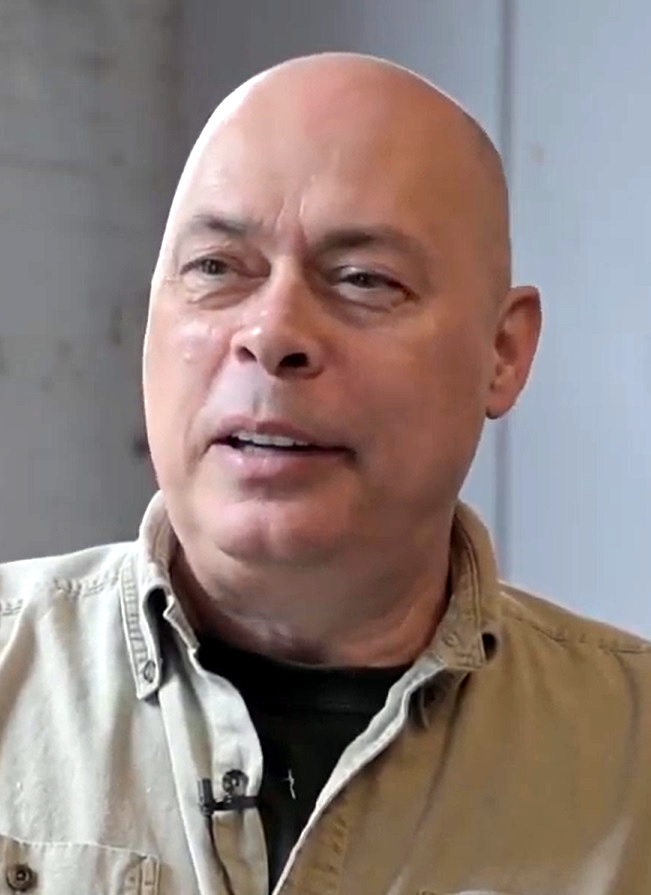
Brad Fraser in 2017

Brad Fraser (born June 28, 1959) is a Canadian playwright. He is one of the most widely produced Canadian playwrights both in Canada and internationally. His plays typically feature a harsh yet comical view of contemporary life in Canada, including frank depictions of sexuality, drug use and violence.

== Career ==
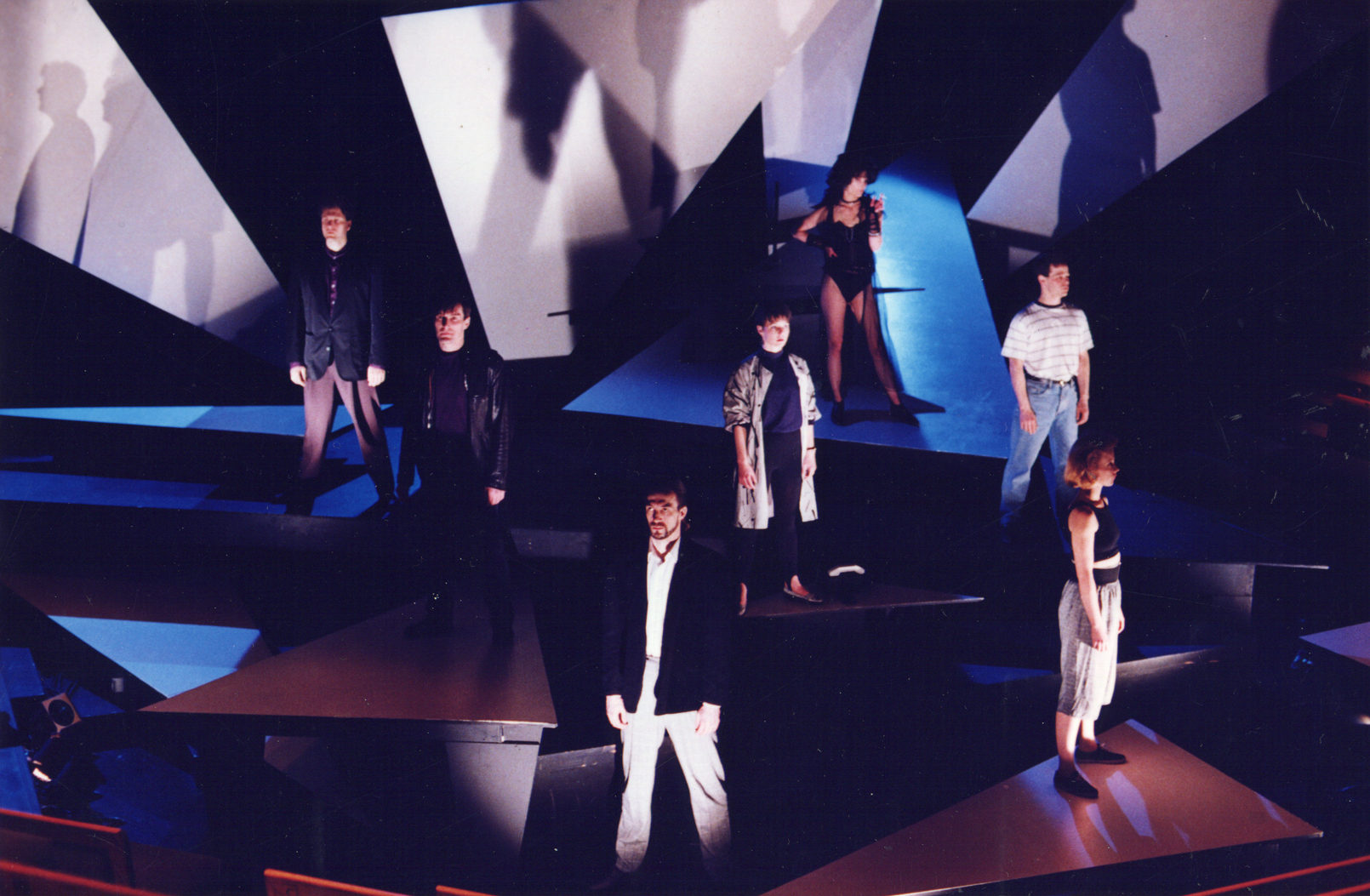
Unidentified Human Remains and the True Nature of Love, produced by Workshop West Theatre

Fraser was born in Edmonton, Alberta. His most noted early play was Wolf Boy; first staged in Edmonton in 1981, its 1984 production in Toronto by Theatre Passe Muraille was later noted as one of the first significant acting roles for Keanu Reeves.

Fraser first came to national and international prominence as a playwright with Unidentified Human Remains and the True Nature of Love, an episodically structured play about a group of people in their 30s trying to find their way through life in Edmonton, while the city is haunted by a serial killer. Written while Fraser was playwright-in-residence with Alberta Theatre Projects (ATP), it was a hit at ATP's playRites '89, and became his national and international breakthrough.

Poor Super Man made international headlines when the board of directors of Ensemble Theatre Cincinnati temporarily cancelled the production because of its anticipated obscenity. After a public outcry, the production was reinstated. Poor Super Man opened without incident.

Fraser also has written two films, Love and Human Remains and Leaving Metropolis, which were both adaptations of his plays; Denys Arcand directed Love and Human Remains, while Leaving Metropolis was Fraser's debut as a film director. He ahas written for the television series Queer as Folk; was host of his own television talk show, Jawbreaker, for PrideVision; and for a period of time wrote a biweekly column for the Canadian gay magazine fab.

His play Kill Me Now premiered in 2014. As of 2021, two film adaptations of Kill Me Now were in development, in Canada and South Korea.

A memoir by Brad Fraser, All the Rage, was published by Doubleday Canada in May 2021.

== Awards ==
Fraser won the Alberta Culture award for best full-length play in 1989, for Unidentified Human Remains and the True Nature of Love.

He is a two-time winner of the Floyd S. Chalmers Canadian Play Award, in 1991 for Unidentified Human Remains and the True Nature of Love and in 1996 for Poor Super Man. He won the Genie Award for Best Adapted Screenplay at the 15th Genie Awards for Love and Human Remains.

Fraser won a Evening Standard Theatre Award for Most Promising Playwright for Unidentified Human Remains and the True Nature of Love in 1993.

He is a two-time nominee for the Governor General's Award for English-language drama, at the 1995 Governor General's Awards for Poor Super Man and at the 2016 Governor General's Awards for Kill Me Now.

== Personal life ==
Fraser is openly gay, and his plays often focus on LGBTQ storylines. In 2003 he became the executive story editor on Showtime's Queer As Folk.

== Plays ==
- Mutants - 1980
- Wolfboy - 1981
- Rude Noises (for a Blank Generation) - 1982
- Chainsaw Love - 1985
- Young Art - 1987
- Return of the Bride - 1988
- Unidentified Human Remains and the True Nature of Love - 1989
- The Ugly Man - 1990
- Prom Night of the Living Dead - 1991, with Darrin Hagen
- Poor Super Man - 1994
- Martin Yesterday - 1997
- Outrageous - 2000, musical with composer Joey Miller
- Snake in Fridge - 2000
- Cold Meat Party - 2003
- True Love Lies - 2009
- 5 @ 50 - 2011
- Kill Me Now - 2014
