= Nick Green (writer) =

Canadian actor and playwright

- Education: University of Alberta
- Occupations: actor, playwright
- Writing career
- Notable works: Body Politic, Casey and Diana

Nick Green is a Canadian actor and playwright. He won the Dora Mavor Moore Award for Outstanding New Play in 2017 for his play Body Politic, a dramatization of the history of the Canadian LGBTQ newsmagazine The Body Politic.

A graduate of the University of Alberta, his prior plays have included Gayface, On the Wire, Undercovered, Coffee Dad, Chicken Mom and the Fabulous Buddha Boy, Under the Big Top, and Bearded Lady.

In 2020, after a production of his newest play was cancelled due to the COVID-19 pandemic, Green launched Social Distancing Festival, a website where arts professionals could share works online.

In 2023, his play Casey and Diana, a dramatization of the 1991 visit of Diana, Princess of Wales, to Casey House, Toronto's HIV/AIDS hospice, premiered at the Stratford Festival under the direction of Andrew Kushnir.

== Works ==
Works by Nick Green
Title	Year	Notes
Coffee Dad, Chicken Mom and the Fabulous Buddha Boy	2008	Produced by Guys In Disguise
Undercovered	2009	Exposure Festival
Under the Big Top	2011	Produced by Twenties St Theatre
Bearded Lady	2012	Produced by Twenties St Theatre
Poof! The Musical	2015	Produced by Capitol Theatre; Composer Joel Crichton
Body Politic	2016	Produced by Buddies in Bad Times and lemonTree Creations
Every Day She Rose	2019	Produced by Nightwood Theatre; Co-written with Andrea Scott
FanGirl (book)	2019	Produced by Musical Stage Company; Composers Anika Johnson and Barbara Johnston
Happy Birthday Baby J	2020	Produced by Shadow Theatre
Living the Dream (book)	2021	Produced by Musical Stage Company; Composers Anika Johnson and Barbara Johnston
Dr. Silver (book)	2023	Produced by South Coast Repertory (Pacific Playwrights Festival); Composers Anika Johnson and Britta Johnson
In Real Life (book)	2024	Produced by Musical Stage Company (Festival of New Musicals); Composer Kevin Wong
The Last Timbit (book)	2024	Produced by Michael Rubinoff and Tim Hortons; Composers Anika Johnson and Britta Johnson
Dinner with the Duchess	2025	Produced by Here for Now Theatre and Crows Theatre
Casey and Diana	2023-2025	Produced by Stratford Festival of Canada; Soulpepper Theatre; Theatre Aquarius; Royal Manitoba Theatre; Neptune Theatre; Arts Club Theatre; Yes Theatre

== Awards ==
Award	Date	Category	Recipient	Result	Ref.
Dora Mavor Moore Awards	2017	Outstanding New Play	Body Politic	Won	
Dora Mavor Moore Awards	2024	Outstanding New Play	Casey and Diana	Nominated	
Elizabeth Sterling Haynes Awards	2009	Outstanding Fringe New Work	Coffee Dad, Chicken Mom and the Fabulous Buddha Boi	Won	
Elizabeth Sterling Haynes Awards	2012	Outstanding New Play	Poof! The Musical	Nominated	
Lambda Literary Awards	2025	LGBTQ Drama	Casey and Diana	Pending	
Playwrights Guild of Canada	2021	Dan School of Drama & Music Musical Award	In Real Life	Won	
