= Kanika Ambrose =

Canadian playwright

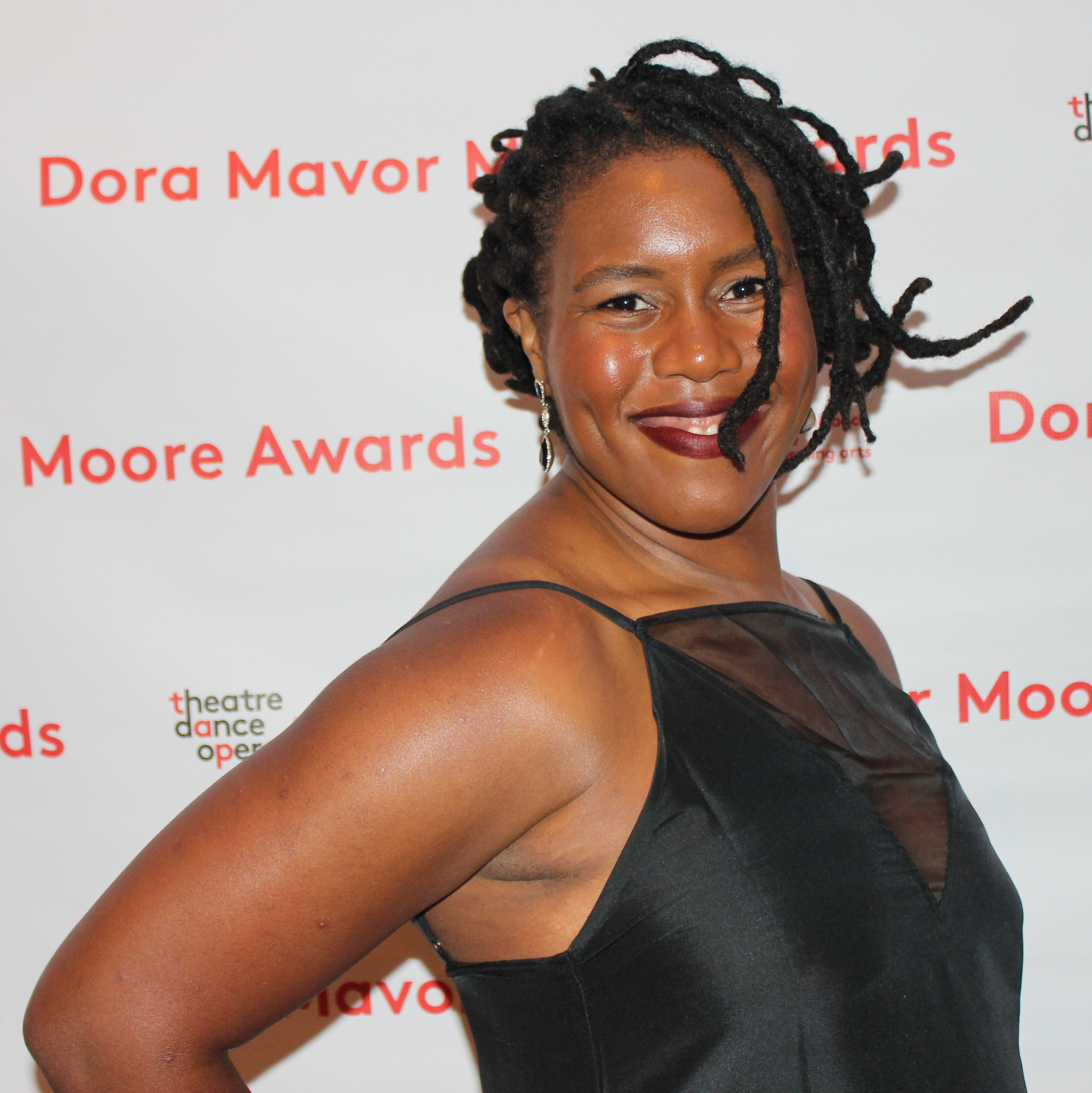
Kanika Ambrose at the Dora Mavor Moore Awards in 2026.

Kanika Ambrose is a Canadian playwright from Toronto, Ontario. She is most noted for her play Our Place, which was the winner of the Dora Mavor Moore Award for Outstanding New Play, General Theatre in 2023.

Our Place centres on two immigrant women in Scarborough who work at a jerk pork restaurant, and are trying to find men to marry so that they can remain in Canada. It was staged by Cahoots Theatre and Theatre Passe Muraille in 2022.
