= Unidentified Human Remains and the True Nature of Love =

1996 omnibus publication of Brad Fraser's screenplay and original stage play.

Unidentified Human Remains and the True Nature of Love is a 1989 stage play written by Canadian playwright Brad Fraser. Set in Edmonton, Alberta, the comedy-drama follows the lives of several sexually frustrated "thirty-somethings" who try to learn the meaning of love — during a time in which a serial killer is terrorizing the city. Unidentified Human Remains and the True Nature of Love was published in 2006 by Playwrights Canada Press as Love and Human Remains.

== Characters ==
Candy, a heterosexual woman trying to meet the perfect man but who along the way finds herself experimenting with lesbianism; David, her homosexual roommate, who no longer believes that love exists; Kane, a sexually confused teenager who idolizes David; Bernie, David's troubled best friend; Jerri, a lesbian who falls in love with Candy. Benita, a prostitute with psychic abilities. Robert, a bartender who takes an interest in Candy Sal, a past friend of David's. An actor.

== Plot ==
Using and subverting elements of various genres, including thriller, situation comedy and grade-B horror film, the piece is written with cynical humor, but is serious in tone. A group of friends, both old & new, live their lives in a Canadian Metropolis. David & Candy are two roommates looking for love, perhaps in the wrong places. Bernie is David's best friend. Kane is David's coworker. Jeri is a lesbian that Candy meets. Rick is a bartender, with a secret, who takes an interest in Candy. Benita is a psychic dominatrix whose talents feature heavily in the last moments of the play. As the action happens around the group of friends, a serial killer is making victims of various women in the city.

== Production history ==
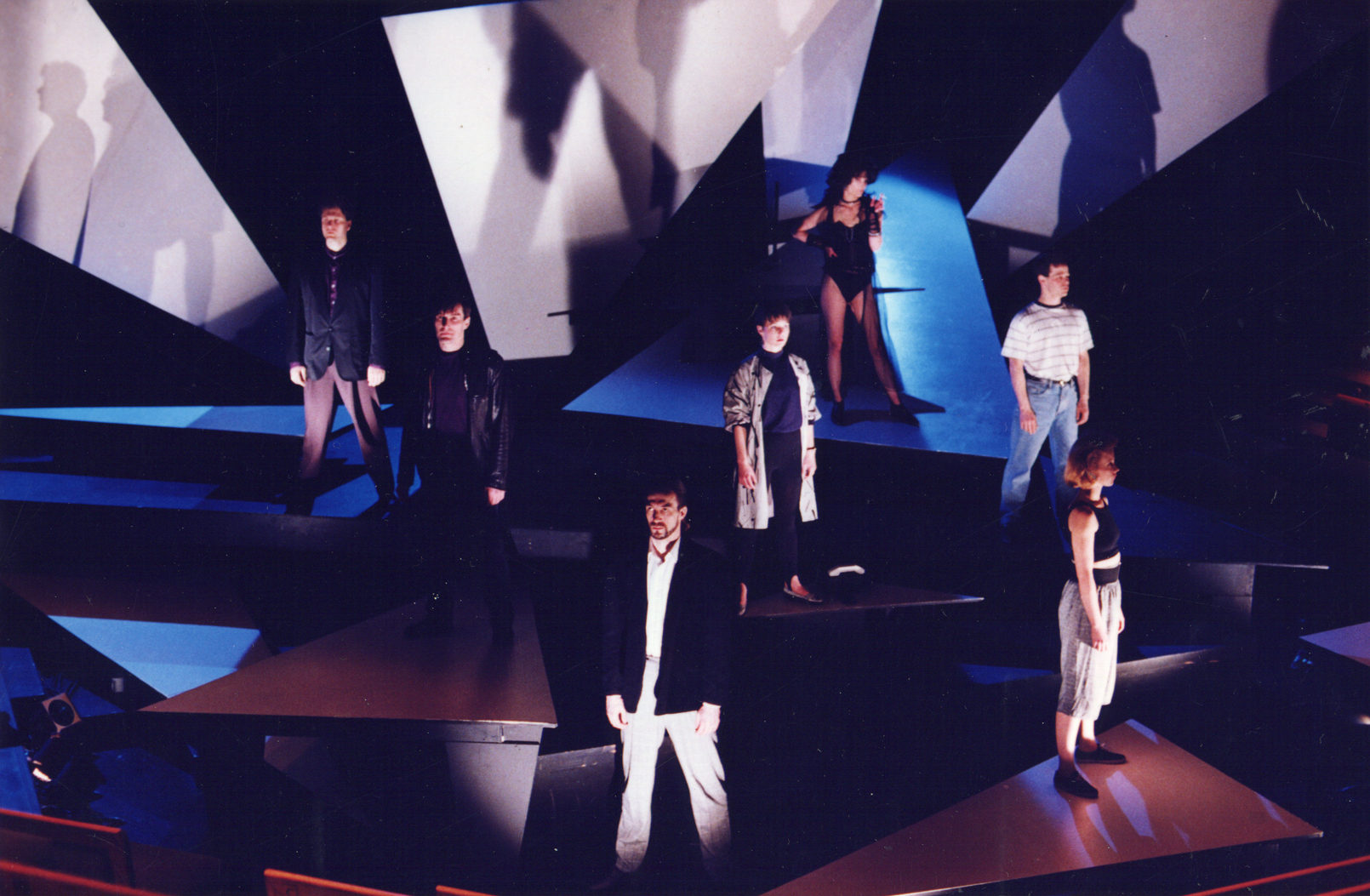
Unidentified Human Remains and the True Nature of Love, Produced by Workshop West Theatre, 1990 Directed by Brad Fraser Designed by David Skelton.

First presented by Alberta Theatre Projects at the playRites '89 Festival in Calgary, Alberta, Unidentified Human Remains was immediately controversial for its violence, nudity, frank dialogue, and sexual explicitness. It nevertheless received critical acclaim; it was named one of the 10 best plays of 1991 by TIME. In 1989, revived again in 1990, Toronto Crow's Theatre mounted a production starring Brent Carver as David. The Royal Manitoba Theatre Centre's 1992 production starred Erica Ehm as Benita and Derek Aasland as Kane. Over the next 15 years, productions in many languages have been mounted from New York City to Japan. In November 2004, a 15th anniversary revival of the piece took place in Calgary, Alberta.

== Film adaptation ==
A film version, Love and Human Remains, was released in 1993.
