= Rosa Labordé =

Canadian playwright, screenwriter, director and actress

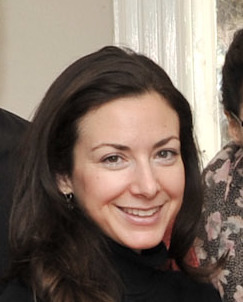
- Occupations: Playwright, actress, screenwriter
- Writing career
- Period: 2000s–present
- Notable work: Léo

Rosa Labordé is a Canadian playwright, screenwriter, director and actress. She is playwright-in-residence at Tarragon Theatre and Aluna Theatre. Her play Léo was shortlisted for the Dora Mavor Moore Award for Outstanding New Play and the Governor General's Award for English-language drama. In 2012 she received the KM Hunter Artist's Award for Theatre. In 2016 she wrote the first two episodes of the second season of HBO Canada's Sensitive Skin.

== Early life ==
Rosa was born to a Chilean mother and Eastern European father and was raised Jewish.

== Plays ==
- The Source
- Sugar
- Leo
- Hush
- Like Wolves
- True
- Marine Life

== Acting ==
Year	Title	Role	Notes
2000	Blur	Christine	Short Film
2001	Heavy Metal: Geomatrix	Slash, Di	Video game
2002	Doc	Joanie	Season 3 Episode 3 "Stroke of Luck"
2002	Puppets Who Kill	CBC Guide	Season 1 Episode 11 "Dan's Umbrella"
2003	Street Time	Receptionist	Season 2 Episode 6 "Born to Kill"
2005	True Crimes: The First 72 Hours	Susan Farland	Season 2 Episode 10 "Head in a Bucket"
2005	1-800-MISSING	Leah Schaeffer	Season 2 Episode 17 "Paper Anniversary"
2006	Bigfoot Presents: Meteor and the Mighty Monster Trucks	Senora Rosa	11 episodes
2006	At the Hotel	Carmelita	6 episodes
2007-2008	History Bites	Various	4 episodes (Canadian Screen Award Nomination)
2008	Jack and Jill vs. the World	Tampon Girl	Feature Film
2008	ReGenesis	Nina Corba	9 episodes
2008	Toot & Puddle	Estella	2 episodes
2009	Rick Mercer Report	Tory	Season 6 Episode 11
2009	The Line	Steph	7 episodes
2010	Unnatural History	Sarah Campbell	Pilot Episode
2009-2010	The Dating Guy	Various	3 episodes
2011	Against the Wall	Jacob's Mom	Season 1 Episode 11
2011	InSecurity	Tara	Season 2 Episode 9
2011	The Lady of Names	Rapunzel	Animated Feature Film
2014	The Secret Sex Life of a Single Mom	Pam	TV movie
2014	Dead on Campus	Jenny	TV movie
2014-2015	Saving Hope	Lana Davis	4 episodes
