= Pillow Talk (Canadian TV series) =

Canadian television comedy series

- Country of origin: Canada

Original release
- Network: Crave
- Release: February 10, 2022 – present

Pillow Talk is a Canadian TV series, which premiered on Crave on February 10, 2022. A sketch comedy series about adult relationships, the series centres on four couples (three heterosexual and one gay) and a pair of platonic roommates, each exploring comedic interpersonal situations through conversations taking place almost entirely in their bedrooms. Despite being set in bedrooms, however, the conversations are not necessarily always sexual in nature, but simply reflect the fact that couples often discuss or argue about almost any aspect of their lives in that part of their home.

The series is an adaptation of Entre deux draps ("Between Two Sheets"), a French-language series which premiered in January 2021 on Noovo.

== Cast and characters ==
Character	French actor	English actor	Profile
Antoine/Andy	Pier-Luc Funk	Adam DiMarco (S1); Matt Mazur (S2)	A young couple who have just recently moved in together; their relationship is complicated by the contrast between his uptight obsession with stability and predictability and her impetuous spontaneity and bipolar disorder.
Lydia	Virginie Ranger-Beauregard	Sydney Scotia	A young couple who have just recently moved in together; their relationship is complicated by the contrast between his uptight obsession with stability and predictability and her impetuous spontaneity and bipolar disorder.
Marco	Guillaume Girard	Carlos Gonzalez-Vio	An adult couple with a young daughter, he works as a high school drama teacher but dreams of getting back to his earlier career as an actor, while she works at a bank. Although they have occasional conflicts between them, they are generally well-matched and see eye-to-eye on most things; their primary challenge is their precocious seven-year-old daughter, who will happily crush spiders to death with her bare hands and thinks nothing of walking in on her parents while they're trying to have sex.
Virginie/Vicky	Karine Gonthier-Hyndman	Nicola Correia-Damude	An adult couple with a young daughter, he works as a high school drama teacher but dreams of getting back to his earlier career as an actor, while she works at a bank. Although they have occasional conflicts between them, they are generally well-matched and see eye-to-eye on most things; their primary challenge is their precocious seven-year-old daughter, who will happily crush spiders to death with her bare hands and thinks nothing of walking in on her parents while they're trying to have sex.
Florence/Abigail	Florence Pilote	Vanessa Lauren Fox	An adult couple with a young daughter, he works as a high school drama teacher but dreams of getting back to his earlier career as an actor, while she works at a bank. Although they have occasional conflicts between them, they are generally well-matched and see eye-to-eye on most things; their primary challenge is their precocious seven-year-old daughter, who will happily crush spiders to death with her bare hands and thinks nothing of walking in on her parents while they're trying to have sex.
Luc/Luke	François Papineau	Andrew Wheeler	A middle-aged couple; he has recently retired and divorced, and is struggling to define his new life, while she is his new girlfriend. They do not yet live together full-time, though she often stays over at his place for the night, with their conflicts and discussions often revolving around learning how to cope with each other's quirks and preferences.
Marie-Ève/Mia	Bénédicte Décary	Sharon Crandall	A middle-aged couple; he has recently retired and divorced, and is struggling to define his new life, while she is his new girlfriend. They do not yet live together full-time, though she often stays over at his place for the night, with their conflicts and discussions often revolving around learning how to cope with each other's quirks and preferences.
Jean-Pascal	Simon Pigeon	Paolo Santalucia	JP is an ambitious political professional who works as a legislative aide to a Parti Québécois member of the Quebec provincial assembly (in the French version) or a Green Party of Canada Member of Parliament (in the English version), while Simon is a rising chef who recently opened his own restaurant in downtown Montreal. Their conflicts most often revolve around reconciling JP's busy rat-race lifestyle with Simon's preferences for a casual and bohemian kind of life, not helped when partway through the season JP's boss gets appointed to the cabinet.
Simon	Antoine Pilon	Gregory Prest	
Valère/Virgil	Fayolle Jean Jr.	Chris Robinson	Longtime friends who moved in together as roommates after both being dumped by their respective girlfriends on the same day. Valère/Virgil has more success meeting women, but prefers to keep it casual, while Thomas is unlucky in love but more focused on finding a serious long-term relationship.
Thomas	Mathieu Pepper	Kwasi Thomas	Longtime friends who moved in together as roommates after both being dumped by their respective girlfriends on the same day. Valère/Virgil has more success meeting women, but prefers to keep it casual, while Thomas is unlucky in love but more focused on finding a serious long-term relationship.

== Production ==
The English adaptation Pillow Talk was announced in June 2021, and went into production in August. The cast includes Adam DiMarco and Sydney Scotia as Andy and Lydia, Andrew Wheeler and Sharon Crandall as Luke and Mia, Nicola Correia-Damude and Carlos Gonzalez-Vio as Marco and Vicki, Paolo Santalucia and Gregory Prest as JP and Simon, and Chris Robinson and Kwasi Thomas as Virgil and Thomas. As in the original series, all five of the main duos in the series are played by actors who live together as couples or roommates in real life.

The series was produced by the same team behind the original Entre deux draps, and was shot on the same sets. Scripts were translated by Laurel Baker and Steve Galluccio, although a few Quebec-specific references in the script were changed to analogues more familiar to English Canadian audiences.

The second season of the English series debuted on August 18, 2023. As Adam DiMarco could not return to the series due to a scheduling conflict with his higher-profile role in The White Lotus, the role of Andy was recast to be played by Matt Mazur.

== Reception ==
John Doyle of The Globe and Mail praised the series as "at times hilarious and at times deeply poignant", writing that "on the evidence of the early episodes, it's a delight."

The show's cast received ensemble nominations for Best Performance in a Variety or Sketch Comedy Program or Series at the 11th Canadian Screen Awards in 2023, and at the 12th Canadian Screen Awards in 2024.

== Entre deux draps ==
Entre deux draps premiered on Noovo in January 2021, as one of the network's first new original scripted programs since its acquisition by Bell Media. The cast includes Pier-Luc Funk and Virginie Ranger-Beauregard as Antoine and Lydia; François Papineau and Bénédicte Décary as Luc and Marie-Ève; Guillaume Girard and Karine Gonthier-Hyndman as Marco and Virginie; Simon Pigeon and Antoine Pilon as Jean-Pascal and Simon; and Fayolle Jean Jr. and Mathieu Pepper as roommates Valère and Thomas. Due to the COVID-19 pandemic in Quebec, the producers primarily cast actors who already lived together as couples or roommates in real life, so that the series could be filmed without violating social distancing restrictions; producer Louis Morissette noted that the casting of roommates Simon Pigeon and Antoine Pilon as the gay couple took place only after the show was unsuccessful in finding a real gay actor couple who were willing to be fully out on camera. Gonthier-Hyndman also later clarified in an interview that she and Girard were no longer still together as a couple.

Florence Pilote, the daughter of actress Mélissa Désormeaux-Poulin, also has a supporting role in the series as the young daughter of Marco and Virginie, and Micheline Bernard and Martin Drainville have supporting roles as Thomas's parents, whom the producers have announced will be given more prominent roles in the second season.

The series was compared in the media to an updated version of the 1990s Quebec television series Un gars, une fille.

In June 2021, at the same time as the English adaptation Pillow Talk was announced, Noovo announced the renewal of Entre deux draps for a second season.

An episode of Entre deux draps was the final program telecasted on Vrak before that channel folded on October 1, 2023.

After 4 seasons, the final episode was aired on November 29, 2023.
