= Paul Dunn (playwright) =

Canadian playwright and actor

Paul Dunn is a Canadian playwright and actor. He was a co-creator with Damien Atkins and Andrew Kushnir of The Gay Heritage Project, a theatrical show dramatizing aspects of LGBT history which was shortlisted for the Dora Mavor Moore Award for Outstanding New Play in 2014,

His other plays have included BOYS, Offensive Shadows, High-Gravel-Blind, Memorial, Outside, Dalton and Company and This Great City.

He is the partner of playwright and actor Mark Crawford.
