= Tomson Highway =

Canadian playwright and novelist

Tomson Highway OC
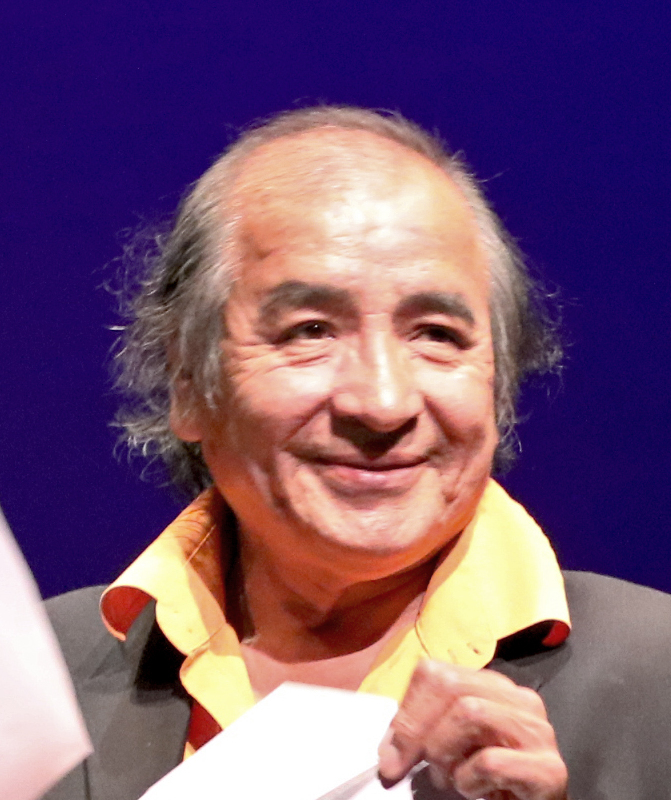
- Highway in 2018
- Born: 6 December 1951 (age 74); Manitoba, Canada
- Education: University of Western Ontario
- Occupations: Playwright, novelist, children's author, pianist
- Writing career
- Language: English, Cree
- Notable works: The Rez Sisters, Dry Lips Oughta Move to Kapuskasing, Kiss of the Fur Queen
- Notable awards: Dora Mavor Moore Award for Outstanding New Play, Floyd S. Chalmers Award Winner of the 2021 Hilary Weston Writers' Trust Prize for Nonfiction for Permanent Astonishment, a Memoir. The book chronicles the first 15 years of Highways life in the remote Subarctic.
- Website: tomsonhighway.ca

Tomson Highway OC (born 6 December 1951) is an Indigenous Canadian playwright, novelist, children's author and musician. He is best known for his plays The Rez Sisters and Dry Lips Oughta Move to Kapuskasing, both of which won the Dora Mavor Moore Award for Outstanding New Play and the Floyd S. Chalmers Award.

Highway also published a novel, Kiss of the Fur Queen (1998), which is based on the events that led to his brother René Highway's death of AIDS. He wrote the libretto for the first Cree language opera, The Journey or Pimooteewin.

== Biography ==
Tomson Highway was born on 6 December 1951 in northwestern Manitoba to Pelagie Cook and Joe Highway, a caribou hunter and champion dogsled racer. Cree is his first language and he was raised according to Cree tradition before being sent to residential school. He is related to actor/playwright Billy Merasty.

When he was six, Tomson's father voluntarily enrolled him at Guy Hill Indian Residential School. Until he was fifteen, he was allowed to return home only during the summer months.

Some children who attended residential schools later reported abuse. Highway has said that "Nine of the happiest years of my life I spent it at that school," crediting it with teaching him English and to play piano. He has said that "There are many very successful people today that went to those schools and have brilliant careers and are very functional people, very happy people like myself. I have a thriving international career, and it wouldn't have happened without that school."

He obtained his B.A. in Honours Music in 1975 and his B.A. in English in 1976, both from the University of Western Ontario. While working on his degree, he met playwright James Reaney. For seven years, Highway worked as a social worker on First Nations reserves across Canada. He also was involved in creating and organizing several Indigenous music and arts festivals.

Drawing from these experiences, he has written novels and plays that have won him widespread recognition across Canada and around the world.

In 1986, Highway published The Rez Sisters, which won multiple awards in productions across Canada. It also went to the Edinburgh International Festival in 1988. In 1989, he published Dry Lips Oughta Move to Kapuskasing, which was the first Canadian play to receive a full production at Toronto's Royal Alexandra Theatre.

Both of these plays explore the community on a fictional First Nation reserve of Wasychigan Hill on Manitoulin Island. The Rez Sisters depicts seven women of the community planning a trip to the "BIGGEST BINGO IN THE WORLD" in Toronto and features a male trickster, called Nanabush. Dry Lips Oughta Move to Kapuskasing depicts the men's interest in ice hockey and features a female trickster. Rose, written in 2000, is the third play in the heptalogy, featuring characters from each of the previous plays.

Highway was artistic director of Native Earth Performing Arts in Toronto from 1986 to 1992, as well as De-ba-jeh-mu-jig theatre group in Wikwemikong.

Frustrated with difficulties presented by play production, Highway wrote a novel called Kiss of the Fur Queen. The novel presents an uncompromising portrait of the sexual abuse of Native children in residential schools and its traumatic consequences. Kiss of the Fur Queen has won a number of awards and spent several weeks on top of Canadian bestseller lists.

After a hiatus from playwriting, Highway wrote Ernestine Shuswap Gets Her Trout in 2005. Set in 1910, the play revolves around the visit of the "Big Kahoona of Canada" (then Prime Minister Wilfrid Laurier) to the Thompson River Valley.

In 2010, Highway re-published The Rez Sisters and Dry Lips Oughta Move to Kapuskasing in a Cree-language edition. Highway said that "the Cree versions [...] are actually the original versions. As it turns out, the original ones that came out 20 years ago were the translation."

His musical The (Post) Mistress premiered in 2009 as a cabaret titled Kisageetin. It was developed as a full musical, which has since been staged across Canada in both English and French versions. A soundtrack album for the musical was released in 2014; it garnered a Juno Award nomination for Aboriginal Album of the Year at the Juno Awards of 2015.

In 2022, Cree Country, an album of original Cree-language country songs written by Highway and sung by his frequent collaborator Patricia Cano, was released.

Highway divides his time between residences in Gatineau, Québec, in France and in Italy with his life partner Raymond Lalonde.

== Awards and recognition ==
Highway has been awarded ten honorary degrees, from Brandon University, the University of Winnipeg, the University of Western Ontario (London), the University of Windsor, Laurentian University (Sudbury, Ontario), Lakehead University (Thunder Bay, Ontario), l'Universite de Montreal, University of Manitoba, Carleton University and the University of Toronto. In addition, he holds two "equivalents" of such honours: from The Royal Conservatory of Music in Toronto and The National Theatre School in Montreal.

In 1994, he was made a member of the Order of Canada. In 1998, Maclean's named him as one of the '100 most important people in Canadian history'. In 2001, he received a National Indigenous Achievement Award, now the Indspire Awards, in the field of arts and culture.

Although Highway is considered one of Canada's most important playwrights, in recent years both theatre critics and Highway have noted a significant gap between his reputation and the relative infrequency of his plays being produced by theatre companies. According to Highway, theatres frequently face or perceive difficulty in finding a suitable cast of First Nations actors, but are reluctant to risk casting non-Indigenous performers due to their sensitivity to being accused of cultural appropriation. He believes that such companies simply pass over his plays instead.

In 2011, director Ken Gass mounted a production of The Rez Sisters at Toronto's Factory Theatre. As part of an ongoing research project into the effects of colour-blind casting on theatre, he staged two readings of the play — one with an exclusively First Nations cast and one with a colour-blind cast of actors from a variety of racial backgrounds — before mounting a full colour-blind stage production.

His memoir Permanent Astonishment was the winner of the 2021 Hilary Weston Writers' Trust Prize for Nonfiction.

Highway gave the 2022 Massey Lecture.

== Works ==
=== Plays ===
- A Ridiculous Spectacle in One Act, Rene Highway Collection, 1990 [1985], OCLC 627046547
- New Song...New Dance - 1986
- Aria - 1987
- The Rez Sisters - first produced 1986; toured nationally 1988 (nominated for a Governor General's Award; won Dora Mavor Moore Award for Best New Play 1986-87)
- Annie and the Old One - 1989
- The Sage, the Dancer, and The Fool - 1989
- Dry Lips Oughta Move to Kapuskasing - 1989 (nominated for a Governor General's Award; nominated for 7, won 4 Dora Mavor Moore Awards including Best New Play; won Floyd S. Chalmers Award)
- The Incredible Adventures of Mary Jane Mosquito - 1991
- Rose - 2000
- Ernestine Shuswap Gets Her Trout - 2005
- Kisageetin - 2009
- The (Post) Mistress - 2010
- Iskooniguni Iskweewuk - The Rez Sisters in its original version: Cree - 2010
- Paasteewitoon Kaapooskaysing Tageespichit - Dry Lips Oughta Move to Kapuskasing in its original version: Cree - 2010
- The Incredible Adventures of Mary Jane Mosquito - 2016

=== Novels ===
- Kiss of the Fur Queen - 1998 (shortlisted for the Chapters/Books in Canada First Novel Award and the Canadian Booksellers' Association Fiction Book of the Year Award)

=== Films ===
- Tomson Highway appears in the 2019 documentary Chaakapesh which describes the process by which the Montreal Symphony Orchestra presented a trilingual (Innu, Cree, Inuktitut) chamber opera called Chaakapesh, le périple du fripon, in 2018.

=== Critical works ===
- Comparing Mythologies - 2003
- From Oral to Written: A Celebration of Indigenous Literature in Canada, 1980-2010 - 2017

=== Children's books ===
- Caribou Song - 2001 (selected as one of the "Top 10 Children's Books" by Canadian newspaper The Globe and Mail)
- Dragonfly Kites - 2002
- Fox on the Ice - 2003

=== Libretti ===
- Pimooteewin - 2008
- Chaakapesh: The Trickster's Quest - 2018

=== Essay ===
- A Tale of Monstrous Extravagance: Imagining Multilingualism, with an introduction by Christine Sokaymoh Frederick. Henry Kreisel Memorial Lecture Series - 2015
- Laughing with the Trickster: On Sex, Death, and Accordions, House of Anansi Press, Massey Lectures, 2022

=== Memoir ===
- Permanent Astonishment - 2021

== Literature ==
- Bauch, Marc A. (2012), Canadian self-perception and self-representation in English-Canadian drama after 1967, Cologne: Wiku Verlag, ISBN 9783865534071
