= René Highway =

Indigenous Canadian dancer and actor

- Born: November 6, 1954; Brochet, Manitoba, Canada
- Died: October 19, 1990 (aged 35); Toronto, Ontario, Canada
- Resting place: Leaf Rapids Cemetery, Leaf Rapids, Manitoba, Canada
- Known for: dancing · acting
- Partner: Micah Barnes
- Relatives: Tomson Highway (brother)

René Highway (November 6, 1954 – October 19, 1990) was an Indigenous Canadian dancer and actor of Cree descent from Brochet, Manitoba. He was the brother of playwright Tomson Highway, with whom he frequently collaborated during their time at Native Earth Performing Arts in Toronto, and the partner of actor and singer Micah Barnes.

Highway studied dance at the Toronto Dance Theatre, at the Tuukaq Teatret in Denmark, and at the Native Canadian Centre of Toronto. Highway helped to create the role of Nanabush in his brother's play The Rez Sisters (1986), and was the choreographer for Dry Lips Oughta Move to Kapuskasing (1989).

== Death and legacy ==
Highway died of AIDS-related causes in Toronto in 1990. His partner was singer Micah Barnes.

Native Earth Performing Arts started the René Highway Foundation in his memory.
