= Justice Denied =

Justice Denied is a print magazine focusing on issues related to wrongful convictions. The magazine prints stories about wrongful convictions, miscarriages of justice, and criminal justice issues related to prosecution and conviction of innocent people in countries around the world.

== Details ==
Justice Denied was founded in 1998 as a volunteer, non-profit magazine to promote awareness of wrongful convictions, and their causes and preventions. Its first issue was in February 1999, and the two original co-publishers were Stormy Thoming-Gale and Clara Boggs.

On January 1, 2011 Justice Denied became an Internet only publication with the current issue and all back issues available online for no charge.

A complete index of the more than 1,000 articles published in Justice Denied related to wrongful convictions in every state in the United States and dozens of other countries is available on its website.

== See all ==
- List of wrongful convictions in the United States
