= Jawbreaker (TV series) =

Canadian talk show hosted by Brad Fraser

- Genre: talk show
- Starring: Brad Fraser (host)
- Country of origin: Canada
- Original language: English
- No. of seasons: 2
- No. of episodes: 27

Production
- Production locations: Toronto, Ontario
- Running time: 60 minutes (season one); 30 minutes (season two)

Original release
- Network: PrideVision TV
- Release: October 11, 2002

Jawbreaker is a Canadian English language television talk show hosted by Brad Fraser. The program features guests who discuss and debate varying topics and issues predominantly relating to the LGBT community. Jawbreaker premiered on October 11, 2002 at 10:00 p.m. EST on the Canadian specialty channel PrideVision TV, now called OUTtv.
