= Alberta Theatre Projects =

- Company type: Not-for-profit
- Industry: Theatre
- Founded: 1972
- Founders: Lucille Wagner and Douglas Riske
- Headquarters: Calgary, Alberta, Canada
- Key people: Haysam Kadri (Artistic Director)
- Number of employees: 35+
- Website: atplive.com

Alberta Theatre Projects ("ATP") is a professional, not-for-profit, Canadian theatre company, founded in 1972 by Lucille Wagner and Douglas Riske, currently based out of the Martha Cohen Theatre in Arts Commons, in Calgary, Alberta. The company is well-known in Canada and internationally for its development of new, Canadian plays and the art of dramaturgy.

Founded by Lucille Wagner and Douglas Riske, ATP started as a children's theatre company in 1972 specializing in historical plays and has grown into one of the largest producers of new plays in Canada.

Originally based in the 198 seat Canmore Opera House at Calgary's Heritage Park, in 1985 the company moved to its current home, the 419-seat Georgian-style Martha Cohen Theatre in Calgary's downtown core. It is currently one of 7 resident arts companies in Arts Commons (formerly known as the Calgary Centre for the Performing Arts), a facility designed by Theatre Project Consultants of London, England, and the original acoustical design was provided by Artec Consultants of New York. It is also one of ten 'Cornerstone Arts Institutions' in the city, as designated by the Calgary Arts Development Agency.

Over the course of its history, ATP has produced more than 288 Canadian plays and premiered over 156 works by Canadian playwrights which have gone on to win over 39 major awards.

Between 1985 and 2000, Allan Rae was composer-in-residence at ATP and many of ATP's productions have featured his original music.

Artistic/producing directors have included Douglas Riske (1972–83), D. Michael Dobbin (1983-2000), Bob White (1999-2009). Vanessa Porteous was appointed as Artistic Director in 2009, becoming the first female Artistic Director in the company's history. In 2018, Darcy Evans was named Executive and Artistic Director. In 2020, Evans died suddenly, and General Manager Kyle Russell stepped into an interim leadership role of the company. Rohit Chokhani briefly assumed the role of Artistic & Executive Director in 2022, and Haysam Kadri took over as Artistic Director in 2023.

== 2017-18 Season ==
- The Last Wife - by Kate Hennig - Sept. 12-30, 2017
- To The Light - by Évelyne de la Chenelière, Translated by John Murrell - Oct. 17 - Nov. 4, 2017
- E.B. White's Charlotte's Web - Adapted by Joseph Robinette - Nov. 21 - Dec. 31, 2017
- Empire of the Son - by Tetsuro Shigematsu - Jan. 16-28, 2018
- Constellations - by Nick Payne - Feb. 20 - Mar. 10, 2018
- GLORY - by Tracey Power - Apr. 3-21, 2018

== Productions ==
Annually, ATP produces six contemporary plays as part of a season that runs from September to April. Recent productions include Shakespeare's Dog (Leon Rooke, adapted by Rick Chafe), I, Claudia (Kristen Thomson), Toad of Toad Hall (Kenneth Grahame, adapted by Philip Goulding). ATP has also presented work by Canadian companies such as: Theatre Newfoundland Labrador, Ronnie Burkett Theatre of Marionettes, Mammalian Diving Reflex, The Old Trout Puppet Workshop, and Crow's Theatre.

Joan MacLeod, playwright for Another Home Invasion which premiered at the 2009 Enbridge playRites Festival of New Canadian Plays, was nominated for a 2009 Governor General's Literary Award. Hannah Moscovitch, playwright for East of Berlin which was one of the ATP cornerstone plays in the 2008/2009 season, was also nominated.

== Enbridge playRites Festival of New Canadian Plays ==
Founded by Producing Director D. Michael Dobbin, the Enbridge playRites Festival of New Canadian Plays was piloted in 1987, and was a leading performing arts event of the 1988 Olympic Arts Festival in Calgary. As of 2008/2009, the Enbridge playRites Festival has produced 99 world premiere plays. 271 subsequent productions of 64 of these plays have appeared across Canada soon after the festival. There have been over 235 productions of plays premiered at the Enbridge playRites Festival throughout Canada and around the world. The festival came to an end in 2013, when the company decided to program more new, Canadian plays as part of its regular season, rather than as part of a festival model.

As part of the Enbridge playRites Festival, ATP has produced work by over 70 Canadian playwrights, including Linda Griffiths, Colleen Murphy, Mieko Ouchi, Conni Massing, Eugene Stickland, Stephen Massicotte, Joan MacLeod, Sally Clark, Wendy Lill, Brad Fraser, Guillermo Verdecchia, Janet Munsil, Sean Dixon, Michael O'Brien, Amiel Gladstone, Donna-Michelle St. Bernard and Sky Gilbert.
