= Katherine Cullen =

American biologist

Katherine Cullen (born 7 November 1968) is an American biologist.

== Early life and education ==
Cullen was born in Midland, Michigan to Jim and Ann Hicks. She attended Herbert Henry Dow High School in Midland. She graduated in 1986, and began her undergraduate degree at Michigan State University. In 1990 she graduated with a Bachelor's of Science in Microbiology and in the same year began her pursuing her PhD at Vanderbilt University in Nashville, TN. In 1995 Cullen received her PhD in molecular biology from Vanderbilt. In her research, Cullen studied cell and molecular life sciences. Her PhD dissertation "focused on how packaging of the prolactin gene into chromatin affected the regulation of its expression." In March 2019, Cullen's research was recognized in Scientific American by Erez Lieberman Aiden.

== Career ==
She then moved to Lexington, Kentucky and began post-doctoral training at the Chandler Medical Center at University of Kentucky in the Department of Biochemistry. While at the University of Kentucky, she "studied the regulation of the transcription of heat shock factors and their expression during spermatogenesis." After finishing her research at the University of Kentucky, Cullen accepted a visiting assistant professor position before becoming the molecular-biologist at Transylvania University in Lexington, Kentucky. She taught courses in microbiology, cell and molecular biology, genetics, molecular genetics, reproductive biology, and general biology. Also while at Transylvania, Cullen began writing and editing scientific education materials for the educational resource company, Mcgraw Hill.

In 2002, Cullen moved to Cleveland, Ohio and began teaching at Lorain County Community College. In 2007 she was hired at Oberlin College in the Biology department where she has continued to work to this day.

=== Research ===
In her undergraduate research at Michigan State University, Cullen was a laboratory technician in the genetics laboratory and researched potato breeding. In the laboratory, the intent of the research was to find restriction fragment length polymorphisms and genetic markers that would provide information about which desirable traits are associated with those genetic markers.

During her dissertation at Vanderbilt University, Cullen and colleagues worked in the laboratory of Dr. Mark Seyfred. Their goal was to look for relationships between how prolactin is packaged and how the gene expression is regulated. They did discover a relationship, although what makes this research notable is that a new technique for probing the chromatin structure was discovered. In their research they developed the Nuclear Ligation Assay (NLA). They concluded that "the two DNA bits often come near to each other in the 3-D space of the cells' nucleus. Today this technique is used in studies regarding nuclear architecture and how DNA is packaged in the nucleus, specifically expanded in research by Eric Lander, Chad Nusbaum, Andreas Gnirke, and Job Dekker. "Cullen's work offered some of the first direct evidence that the larger three-dimensional structure of the genome is related to its function." Her research also led to the formation of the well-known method "Hi-C" also known as "3C".
