= Mark Crawford (playwright) =

Canadian theatre actor and playwright

- Education: University of Toronto; Sheridan College
- Occupations: Actor, playwright
- Spouse: Paul Dunn

Mark Crawford is a Canadian theatre actor and playwright. He is best known for his plays, The Birds and the Bees (2016) and The New Canadian Curling Club (2018), which have been widely produced across Canada.

== Personal life ==
Crawford is from Glencoe, Ontario, where he grew up on a farm. He graduated from the joint theatre and drama studies program offered by University of Toronto and Sheridan College in 2004.

Crawford is the partner of playwright and actor Paul Dunn.

== Career ==
=== Acting ===
In 2011, Crawford played the dual role of Craig Donner / Grady in a production of The Normal Heart by Buddies in Bad Times Theatre. He reprised his role when the production was remounted the following year at the same venue, due to popular demand.

In 2014, Crawford played Mr. Gilmer and Boo Radley in a production of To Kill a Mockingbird by the Young People's Theatre in Toronto.

In 2022, Crawford was cast in the Canadian premiere production of Harry Potter and the Cursed Child. He played the Station Master, was a member of the ensemble, and an understudy for Ron Weasley.

=== Writing ===
After being a stage actor for ten years, Crawford began writing plays which often combine social commentary with comedy.

Crawford's first theatrical play he wrote was Stag and Doe, which premiered at the Blyth Festival in 2014. It was written as a "love letter" to rural communities across Canada, and inspired by a stag and doe that was held for his brother.

His second play was called Bed and Breakfast, about a gay couple from Toronto who open a bed and breakfast in a small town. It premiered at the Thousand Islands Playhouse in 2015.

In 2016, Crawford's next play, The Birds and the Bees, premiered at the Blyth Festival. The play, which is a sex farce about beekeepers, has become one of the most widely produced plays across Canada.

In 2017, Boys, Girls and Other Mythological Creatures premiered. The original production was presented by Carousel Players, who toured the production to schools across Ontario. It is a youth play about a young child struggling with gender identity issues and acceptance. In 2017, the Niagara Catholic District School Board cancelled performances of the show at five of their schools because of concerns about the themes of the show.

Crawford's next play was The New Canadian Curling Club, which premiered at the Blyth Festival in 2018. The play is a comedy about new immigrants to Canada joining a curling team, which has since been produced across Canada.

In 2023, Crawford's play The Gig premiered at Theatre Aquarius. The play is about a drag queen who has been hired to put together the entertainment for a Conservative political candidate's campaign kickoff event.

== Theatre credits ==
=== As performer ===
Year	Production	Role	Theatre	Category	Ref.
2009	The Tempest	Trinculo	High Park Amphitheatre	Canadian Stage Company	
2010	The Waves	Neville	Toronto Fringe Festival		
2011	The Normal Heart	Craig Donner / Grady / Orderly	Alexander Street Chamber Theatre	Regional: Buddies in Bad Times Theatre	
2012	A Midsummer Night’s Dream	Francis Filchenkov	High Park Amphitheatre	Canadian Stage Company	
2012	The Normal Heart	Craig Donner / Grady / Orderly	Alexander Street Chamber Theatre	Regional: Buddies in Bad Times Theatre	
2013	Memorial	Dylan	Regional: Factory Theatre		
2014	To Kill a Mockingbird	Mr. Gilmer / Boo Radley / Mob	Susan Rubes Theatre	Regional: Young People's Theatre	
2016	The Winter's Tale	Clown / Gaoler	Regional: Coal Mine Theatre		
2016	Trompe-La-Mort, or Goriot in the 21st Century	Peter	Regional: Factory Theatre		
2017	Measure for Measure	Elbow / Barnardine	Winter Garden Theatre	Regional: Groundling Theatre Company	
2018	Prairie Nurse	Dr. Miles MacGreggor	Regional: Factory Theatre		
2022–2023	Harry Potter and the Cursed Child	Ensemble/Station Master, u/s Ron Weasley	Ed Mirvish Theatre	Mirvish Productions	

=== As playwright ===
- Stag and Doe (2014)
- Bed and Breakfast (2015)
- The Birds and the Bees (2016)
- Boys, Girls, and Other Mythological Creatures (2017)
- The New Canadian Curling Club (2018)
- The Gig (2023)
