= Dry Lips Oughta Move to Kapuskasing =

1989 play by Tomson Highway

Dry Lips Oughta Move to Kapuskasing is a play by Canadian writer Tomson Highway (Cree), which premiered in 1989 at Theatre Passe-Muraille in Toronto.

== Character List ==
- Nanabush (playing the spirit of Gazelle Nataways, Patsy Pegahmagahbow, and Black Lady Halked): A mythical and spiritual creature that possesses the female characters.
- Zachary Jeremiah Keeschigeesik: He is the main character and is having a nightmare that Nanabush put on him. He fears coming home to his wife after waking up on Big Joey's couch with Big Joey's girlfriend but ends up waking up from the nightmare on his own couch with his wife and child.
- Hera Keechigeesik: Zachary's wife
- Big Joey: Is a warrior for the rez. He denies being the father to Dickie Bird Halked. His violence is supposed to be against the oppressive white systems but instead his violence is more against the other Natives of the rez. He witnesses Dickie Bird sexually assault Patsy but refuses to intervene, or let Creature intervene. His reason for letting Patsy be assaulted is that he hates women (page 120).
- Dickie Bird Halked: The illegitimate child of Big Joey. He was born in a bar and suffers from fetal alcohol syndrome; he is unable to talk. He sexually assaults Patsy with a crucifix, and kills her unborn baby.
- Pierre St. Pierre: The Rez bootlegger
- Spooky Lacroix: He has an obsession with Christianity. Throughout the play, he encourages his old friends to join his religion. He also frowns upon cursing and drinking
- Simon Starblanket: He is struggling with self-realization because he lost his belief in spirituality and tradition. His girlfriend is pregnant. He intends to go to South Dakota because of the Native suppression.
- Creature: Big Joey's side kick. He almost always takes Big Joey's side because he is in love with him.

== Plot summary ==
Set in the fictional Wasaychigan Hill reserve in Northern Ontario, Dry Lips is a companion piece to Highway's earlier play The Rez Sisters. The Rez Sisters focused on seven women from the community; Dry Lips, whose original working title was The Rez Brothers, is about seven men. It is written in a mix of English, Cree, and Ojibway. It tells the story of life on the Wasaychigan Hill Indian Reserve and the men on the reserve as well.

The men talk about their plans; Big Joey wants to get a radio show, Zachary wants to open a bakery while Pierre St. Pierre got a new job as a referee for the women's hockey games. Nanabush is a trickster; she can change shape and gender, enact the men's phobias and fantasies about women and also shows the misogynistic attitudes of the men in the play. Each character has their own story within the bigger picture.

The play's original cast included Gary Farmer, Billy Merasty and Graham Greene. Highway's brother René and musician Carlos del Junco were also involved in the production.

In 2010, Highway also staged Paasteewitoon Kaapooskaysing Tageespichit, a Cree language version of the play.

== Awards ==
- Dora Mavor Moore Awards, 1989
  - Outstanding New Play (Tomson Highway)
  - Outstanding Production (Theatre Passe Muraille and Native Earth Performing Arts Inc.)
  - Outstanding Performance by a Male in a Leading Role (Graham Greene)
  - Outstanding Performance by a Female in a Featured Role (Doris Linklater)
- Floyd S. Chalmers Canadian Play Award, 1989
- Governor General's Literary Award (shortlisted in English Drama)

== Bibliography ==
- Djubal, Clay."Strategies of Subversion: An Examination of Tomson Highway's The Rez Sisters and its Appropriation of Sonata Form" The University of Queensland, 1998. Includes an analysis of Dry Lips. (Retrieved 31 January 2014).
