= The Rez Sisters =

Play by Tomson Highway

- Original language: English
- Written by: Tomson Highway
- Subject: Indian reserve life
- Setting: A fictional reserve on Manitoulin Island, Ontario, Canada

Premiere
- Date: November 26, 1986
- Place: Native Canadian Centre of Toronto

The Rez Sisters is a two-act play by Canadian writer Tomson Highway (Cree), first performed on November 26, 1986, by Act IV Theatre Company and Native Earth Performing Arts.

The Rez Sisters is partially inspired by Michel Tremblay's play Les Belles-soeurs. It explores the hopes and dreams of a group of seven women on the fictional Wasaychigan Hill Indian reserve. While Highway's treatment of his women characters is sympathetic and perhaps gentler than Tremblay's, their portrayal expresses a gritty and grim realism.

The Rez Sisters is the first of an unfinished cycle of seven plays which the playwright refers to as his Rez Septology. It includes a 'flip side' play Dry Lips Oughta Move to Kapuskasing (1989), originally entitled The Rez Brothers.

The Rez Sisters features an ensemble cast of seven women dreaming of winning, and working toward raising enough money to attend, "The Biggest Bingo in the World," and one male actor/dancer in the role of Nanabush (originally played by the playwright's brother René Highway). The play melds the sometimes dark realities of life on a First Nation reserve with humour and elements of Aboriginal spirituality. It features some dialogue in the Cree and Ojibway languages.

In 2010, Highway staged Iskooniguni Iskweewuk, a Cree language version of the play.

== Characters ==
Main Characters	Background	Affliction	Fate
Pelajia Patchnose	Her sons are in Toronto. Her husband is in Espanola. Her mother is dead. She works as a contractor. She is sister of Philomena, half-sister of Marie-Adele, Annie, and Emily.	She is trapped at the reserve which she has come to hate.	She is back where she started, still trapped on the reserve, although she has developed a sense of sympathy. She considers becoming the chief.
Philomena Moosetail	She had an affair with a client of her boss in Toronto, and she later gave their child up for adoption without getting to see him or her. Her mother is dead. She is sister of Pelajia, half-sister of Marie-Adele, Annie, and Emily.	Her lover got her pregnant but then left with his wife. She knows nothing of the child she bore, not even its gender.	She wins $600 from the bingo and buys the porcelain toilet bowl she has been wanting. But she too is back where she started, still trapped on the reserve.
Marie-Adele Starblanket	She stole Eugene from Annie, with whom she has fourteen kids. Sister of Annie - and Emily, half-sister of Pelajia and Philomena.	She has terminal cancer. She fears that Eugene's drinking will worsen after her death, and their children will be put into foster care.	She dies while the rest of the sisters are playing bingo, and dances with Nanabush.
Annie Cook	She has a daughter, Ellen, who lives with her boyfriend, Raymond, in Sudbury. She is sister of Marie-Adele and Emily, half-sister of Pelajia and Philomena.	She lost her love, Eugene, to her own sister, Marie- Adele.	She gets a job as a back-up singer for Fritz the Katz at Little Current and she comes closer to achieving his love. She would rather be a Jewish princess than an Indian princess.
Emily Dictionary	She works at a store. She left the Rez Sisters motorbike gang after her lover, Rose, killed herself by running head-on into an 18-wheeler. She is sister of Marie-Adele and Annie, half-sister of Pelajia and Philomena.	She was forced to flee and abandon her children after her abusive husband attempted to kill her with an axe. She is grieving the death of her lover, Rosie.	She comes back to her store, but is pregnant with Big Joey's baby.
Veronique St. Pierre	She adopted Zhaboonigan with her husband, Pierre. She is sister-in-law of the above.	She is disliked by almost everybody. Her husband, Pierre, drinks all the money away.	She gets the new stove that she has been wanting. She uses it to cook for Eugene, widower of Marie-Adele, and his children.
Zhaboonigan Peterson	She is mentally challenged. Her parents died in a car crash. She was then adopted by Veronique St. Pierre and her husband, Pierre.	She was sexually abused with a screwdriver by two white men. Teased by other characters.	She comes to trust Emily and learns to help Emily at her store.

== Synopsis ==
The opening scene begins with Pelajia Patchnose nailing shingles on her roof on the fictional Wasaychigan Hill Indian Reserve on Manitoulin Island, Ontario. She is joined by her sister, Philomena, with whom she discusses her longing to leave the reserve, to which Philomena replies skeptically: "But you were born here. All your poop's on this reserve". They are joined by their half sister, Annie Cook, who they treat disdainfully, and who shares the news that she is expecting a package before leaving to pick it up.

Meanwhile, Marie-Adele is playing with Zhaboonigan, while Nanabush, in the form of a seagull, watches on. This is where we first learn of Marie-Adele's (cervical?) cancer, and Veronique's insecurity about having no blood children of her own. The various tensions between the seven sisters, such as shared lovers and stolen husbands, is slowly exposed. This is also when we first hear rumors about THE BIGGEST BINGO IN THE WORLD, a possibility which all the women are ecstatic about. Soon Annie arrives and the women march to Emily Dictionary's store to discover the details.

Once the women are gathered at the store long suffering tempers flare and the scene dissolves into the sisters tussling and exchanging verbal attacks, during which Zhabooginan wanders to the side stage and re-accounts her brutal rape by two white boys with a screwdriver to her audience, Nanabush, who is experiencing "agonizing contortions" during the retelling.

However, as soon as news of THE BIGGEST BINGO IN THE WORLD is confirmed, the women promptly stop their squabbling and cooperatively plan how to fund the trip to Toronto in order to attend. A mad flurry of activities ensue as the women plan the trip and raise money in various ways. Once they have consolidated their efforts and funds, they set out on the drive in a borrowed van.

They encounter several diversions, a flat tire, Marie-Adele collapsing (and having another encounter with Nanabush, this time as a nighthawk), but the most notable part of the scene is the emotional stories the women exchange: Emily re-accounts witnessing her lesbian lover die in a motorcycle accident, Marie-Adele expresses her fear of dying, etc.

Finally they arrive at THE BIGGEST BINGO IN THE WORLD, where Nanabush plays the bingo master and the audience plays along. At the end of this climactic scene, Marie-Adele dies just as the other women are losing. The play jumps back to Wasaychigan Hill, and Philomena has won $600 and got a new toilet, but otherwise things remain largely unchanged.

== Themes and motifs ==
Nanabush

Nanabush, who is described by Tomson as "pivotal and important a figure in the Native world as Christ is in the realm of Christian mythology," is a central and symbolic character in the play. He is seen as an influence when he states, "He says we mustn't take everything so seriously all the time. He says we must laugh, and laugh some more." Although he is specifically played by a male actor in the Rez Sisters, Tomson switches the gender in Dry Lips, noting that Nanabush is traditionally dual-gendered. The character is present in both scenes of joy (Marie-Adele and Zhaboonigan innocently playing), and of anguish and despair (Zhaboonigan describing her rape, the women fighting, Marie-Adele collapsing, dying). He is seen as more than human, perhaps as human, item, and being, described as such, "Nanabush is in everything. The wind, the trees, the animals. He's always watching, always listening," and "Nanabush, he's like the wind. You can't see him, but you can feel him." These appearances possibly speak to the understanding of Nanabush as an apathetic deity, reinforcing the ending of the play: circular (Pelajia is once more on her roof), and without resolution. Nanabush, who ‘appears’ in bird form, is only seen as "the spirit inside" by Marie-Adele (who is close to death), and Zhaboonigan (who has a mental handicap), perhaps speaking to the relegation of this deity to the margin in the Aboriginal community.

Rape/ Screwdriver

In the play, the details of Zhaboonigan's sexual assault - including her being abducted and attacked with a screwdriver - closely parallel the details of the 1971 murder of Helen Betty Osborne of Norway House, Manitoba. Despite overwhelming physical evidence — blood, hair and clothing fragments were found in one of the suspects' cars — it was not until 1987, a year after The Rez Sisters opened, that two out of the three suspects in Osbourne's murder were charged. Highway's deeply sympathetic character, Zhaboonigan, can be seen as a statement against the injustice inflicted upon Osborne.

== Criticism and interpretation ==
=== Queer Theory ===
At the time that this play was written, being openly gay was an extremely risky endeavour. Though Highway subtly veils it for the first act, it is confirmed in the second that Emily Dictionary has had a female lover. She says of witnessing the death of the former leader of her "pack" of biker women: "When I got to Chicago, that's when I got up the nerve to wash my lover's dried blood from off my neck. I loved that woman, Marie-Adele, I loved her like no man's ever loved a woman."

=== Camp ===
The over-the-top and sometimes brash character portrayal (sisters tickling one another on the breasts) can be attributed to camp theatrical style, intentionally meant to shock and evoke strong audience reaction.

=== Colour-blindness ===
Although the play is considered a classic of Canadian theatre, Highway himself has noted that it is rarely staged by theatre companies. According to Highway, theatres frequently face or perceive difficulty in finding a suitable cast of First Nations actors, but are reluctant to take the risk of casting non-aboriginal performers due to their sensitivity around accusations of cultural appropriation, with the result that the play is often simply passed over instead.

In 2011, director Ken Gass mounted a production of The Rez Sisters at Toronto's Factory Theatre. As part of an ongoing research project into the effects of colour-blind casting on theatre, he staged two readings of the play — one with an exclusively First Nations cast and one with a colour-blind cast of actors from a variety of racial backgrounds — before mounting a full colour-blind stage production.

== Awards ==
- Won 1986-87 Dora Mavor Moore Award for Outstanding New Play.
- Winner of the Floyd S. Chalmers Canadian Play Award in 1987
- Nominated for the Governor General's Award for English-language drama in 1988

== Bibliography ==
- Djubal, Clay."Strategies of Subversion: An Examination of Tomson Highway's The Rez Sisters and its Appropriation of Sonata Form" The University of Queensland, 1998. (Retrieved 31 January 2014).
