= Hannah Moscovitch =

Canadian playwright (born 1978)

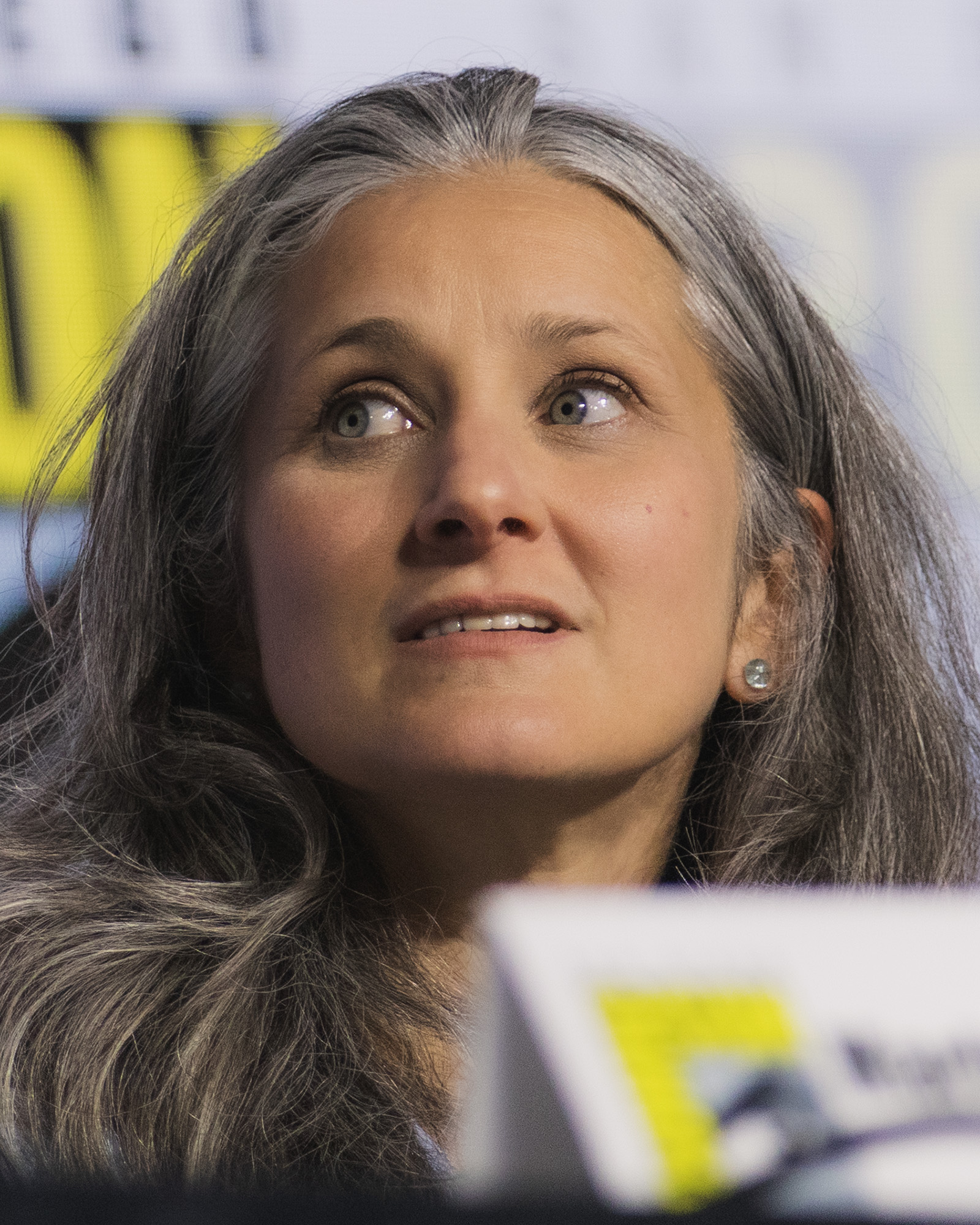
- Moscovitch in 2026
- Born: June 5, 1978 (age 48); Ottawa, Ontario, Canada
- Citizenship: Canadian
- Education: National Theatre School
- Occupation: Playwright; Screenwriter; Executive Producer
- Notable work: Sexual Misconduct of the Middle Classes; Old Stock: A Refugee Love Story
- Spouse: Christian Barry
- Children: 1
- Awards: Governor General's Literary Award; Windham–Campbell Literature Prize; Trillium Book Award

Hannah Moscovitch (born June 5, 1978) is a Canadian playwright, screenwriter, and executive producer who rose to national prominence in the 2000s. She is best known for her plays East of Berlin, This Is War, "Old Stock: A Refugee Love Story", and Sexual Misconduct of the Middle Classes, for which she received the 2021 Governor General's Award for English-language drama.

== Early life and education ==
Born in Ottawa, Moscovitch is currently based in Toronto and Halifax. Her father, Allan Moscovitch, is a social policy professor at Carleton University. Her mother, Julie White, is a labour researcher. Both have long been active in left wing politics. Moscovitch's father is Jewish, of Romanian and Ukrainian background, while her mother is from a Christian background (of English and Irish ancestry). Moscovitch was "raised as an atheist", and has said that there is "implicitly Jewish sensibility" to her plays. She studied at the National Theatre School in the acting stream.

== Career ==
=== Playwright ===
Moscovitch gained considerable notice for two short plays written for Toronto's SummerWorks. In 2005, she presented Essay, a play about gender politics in modern academia. The next year at the festival The Russian Play premiered, a romance set in Stalinist Russia. Both were well received by critics and audiences. In 2007, her first full-length play, East of Berlin, premiered at the Tarragon Theatre. The play focuses on the legacy of the Holocaust on the children of those involved. The main character is the son of a Nazi war criminal who grows up in Paraguay. He eventually travels to Berlin and meets the daughter of an Auschwitz survivor. The play was acclaimed for its complex subject, humour, and characters and was also a popular success, returning to Tarragon in winter 2009 and 2010.

2013 saw the premiere of This Is War, a play depicting the lives of Canadian troops in Afghanistan. This Is War won multiple awards with one reviewer writing "Moscovitch shines a light on massive issues like sexual harassment within the military without making her play a morality tale or exposé. It’s a story about four good people in a bad place and all the gray area that that produces." In 2015, Moscovitch wrote the play Infinity about a physicist who becomes involved in a love story while contemplating the nature of time. She collaborated with Lee Smolin to lend verisimilitude to some of the theoretical ideas.

Moscovitch's plays have been widely produced across Canada, including at the Magnetic North Theatre Festival, Ottawa's Great Canadian Theatre Company, The National Arts Centre, Toronto's Factory Theatre, Edmonton's Theatre Network, the Manitoba Theatre Centre, Vancouver's Firehall Arts Centre, the Alberta Theatre Projects, and Montreal's Imago Theatre. Moscovitch is currently playwright-in-residence at Tarragon Theatre and was previously a contributing writer to the CBC radio drama series Afghanada (2006-2011).

She has been dubbed "an indie sensation" by Toronto Life Magazine; "the wunderkind of Canadian theatre" by CBC Radio; "irritatingly talented" by the now defunct Eye Weekly; and the "dark angel of Toronto theatre" by Toronto Star. The National Post, The Globe and Mail, and Now Magazine have all hailed Moscovitch as "Canada's Hottest Young Playwright".

=== Screenwriter ===
In 2021, Moscovitch and Jennifer Podemski created the drama series Little Bird for Crave.

Since 2021, Moscovitch has been a writer for the AMC series Interview with the Vampire and was an executive producer for its third season, The Vampire Lestat. On 24 July 2026, AMC announced the renewal of the show for a fourth season titled Queen of the Damned, for which Moscovitch will serve as showrunner.

== Works ==
=== Plays ===
- Essay – 2005
- The Russian Play – 2006
- East of Berlin – 2007
- In This World – 2008
- The Children's Republic – 2009
- Little One – 2011
- Other People's Children – 2012
- This Is War – 2012
- I Have no Stories to Tell You – 2013
- Infinity – 2014
- What a Young Wife Ought To Know – 2015
- The Kaufman Cabaret - 2016 - Commissioned by the University of Alberta
- Bunny – 2016
- Old Stock: A Refugee Love Story - 2017
- Secret Life of a Mother - 2018
- Sky on Swings - 2019
- Sexual Misconduct of the Middle Classes - 2020
- Post-Democracy - 2021
- Fall On Your Knees (adaptation) - 2023

=== Television ===
Year	Title	Creator	Writer	Executive producer	Network	Notes	Ref.
2013	Played	No	Yes	No	CTV		
2015–2016	X Company	No	Yes	Co-producer	CBC Television	Also executive story editor	
2022–present	Interview with the Vampire	No	Yes	Yes	AMC	Showrunner (Season 4-)	
2023	Little Bird	Yes	Yes	Yes	Crave, APTN lumi		

== Awards and honours ==
Moscovitch won Dora Mavor Moore Awards for In This World (2010) and "Infinity" (2015). She won both the Trillium Book Award and Toronto Critic's Awards in 2014 for This Is War. She has won the Nova Scotia Masterworks Award for "Old Stock: A Refugee Love Story", and the SummerWorks Prize for Best Production for The Russian Play.

She received the Windham–Campbell Literature Prize (2016) in the Drama category, becoming the first Canadian woman to win the prize.

She was the winner of the Governor General's Award for English-language drama at the 2021 Governor General's Awards for her play Sexual Misconduct of the Middle Classes.

Award nominations received by Moscovitch include the Siminovitch Prize, the Governor General's Award, the Carol Bolt Award, the Susan Smith Blackburn Prize, the KM Hunter Award and the Toronto Arts Council Foundation Emerging Artist Award.

Year	Award	Category	Work	Result	Ref.
2005	SummerWorks Contra Guys Award	Best New Script	Essay	Won	
2006	SummerWorks Jury Prize	Outstanding New Production	The Russian Play	Won	
2007	Toronto Arts Council Foundation Emerging Artist Award			Nominated	
2008	Dora Mavor Moore Award	Best New Play	Essay	Nominated	
2008	Dora Mavor Moore Award	Best New Play	East of Berlin	Nominated	
2008	The K.M Hunter Artist Award			Nominated	
2009	The K.M Hunter Artist Award			Nominated	
2009	Carol Bolt Award		East of Berlin	Nominated	
2009	Governor General’s Literary Award	Drama	East of Berlin	Nominated	
2010	Susan Smith Blackburn Prize		East of Berlin	Nominated	
2010	Dora Mavor Moore Award	Best New Play for Young Audiences	In this World	Won	
2010	Dora Mavor Moore Award	Best New Production	The Huron Bride	Won	
2010	Dora Mavor Moore Award	Best New Play	The Huron Bride	Nominated	
2013	Dora Mavor Moore Award	Best New Play	Little One	Nominated	
2013	Carol Bolt Award		This is War	Nominated	
2013	Toronto Theatre Critics’ Award	Best Canadian Play	This is War	Won	
2014	Trillium Book Award	Outstanding work of literature in Ontario	This is War	Won	
2015	Siminovitch Prize			Finalist	
2015	Dora Mavor Moore Award	Best New Play	Infinity	Won	
2015	New York Fringe Festival Overall Excellence Award		Little One	Won	
2015	Gascon-Thomas Award	Award for Revitalizing Canadian Theatre		Awarded	
2016	Donald Windham-Sandy M. Campbell Literature Prizes (Beinecke Library, Yale University)	Drama	East of Berlin	Won	
2016	Nova Scotia MasterWorks Arts Award		What a Young Wife Ought to Know	Finalist	
2017	Fringe First at the Edinburgh Fringe Festival		Old Stock: A Refugee Love Story	Won	
2017	Herald Angel at the Edinburgh Fringe Festival		Old Stock: A Refugee Love Story	Won	
2017	Siminovitch Prize			Finalist	
2018	Drama Desk Award	Outstanding Book of a Musical	Old Stock: A Refugee Love Story	Nominated	
2018	Dora Mavor Moore Award	Best Touring Production	What a Young Wife Ought to Know	Nominated	
2018	Toronto Theatre Critics’ Award	Best Canadian Play	Bunny	Won	
2018	Nova Scotia MasterWorks Arts Award	Lieutenant Governor	Old Stock: A Refugee Love Story	Won	
2019	International Opera Awards	World Premiere Category	Sky on Swings	Won	
2019	Toronto Theatre Critics’ Award	Best New Canadian Musical	Old Stock: A Refugee Love Story	Won	
2019	Governor General's Literary Awards		What a Young Wife Ought to Know	Nominated	
2019	Dora Mavor Moore Award	Best New Play	Secret Life of a Mother	Finalist	
2021	Governor General’s Literary Award	Drama	Sexual Misconduct of the Middle Classes	Won	
2022	Jim Connors Dartmouth Book Award	Fiction	Sexual Misconduct of the Middle Classes	Shortlisted	
2024	Canadian Screen Awards	Best Drama Series	Little Bird	Won	
