= Native Earth Performing Arts =

- Company type: Theatre Company
- Founded: 1982
- Headquarters: Toronto, Ontario, Canada
- Website: www.nativeearth.ca

Native Earth Performing Arts is a Canadian theatre company located in Toronto, Ontario. Founded in 1982, Native Earth is Canada's oldest professional Indigenous theatre company. Native Earth is dedicated to developing, producing and presenting professional artistic expressions of the Indigenous experience in Canada.

Through stage productions (theatre, dance and multi-disciplinary art), new script development, apprenticeships and internships, Native Earth seeks to fulfill a community of artistic visions. It is a vision that is inclusive and reflective of the artistic directions of members of the Indigenous community who actively participate in the arts.

Native Earth Performing Arts helms Aki Studio, a 120-seat black box creation/rehearsal/performance space in Regent Park's Daniels Spectrum.

== Background ==
Founded in 1982, it is the oldest professional Indigenous performing arts company in Canada. They have been central in the development of a community of Indigenous artists, and have contributed to the creation of several plays which have become canonical in Canadian drama, such as Tomson Highway's award-winning The Rez Sisters and Dry Lips Oughta Move to Kapuskasing, Daniel David Moses's Almighty Voice and His Wife, Drew Hayden Taylor's Someday, and Cliff Cardinal's Huff. Native Earth hosts the annual Weesageechak Begins to Dance festival which is a showcase for emerging Indigenous theatre, dance, and multi-discipline artists.

In 1986 Native Earth was able to secure government funding, which brought stability to the organization. This funding allowed Native Earth the possibility to program a season and open its own office with full-time staff.

In the same year Native Earth presented its first scripted work, Tomson Highway's The Rez Sisters which became a hit and attracted large audiences across Canada. The Play was so successful that it was also invited to the Edinburgh Festival and received the Dora Mavor Moore Award and the Floyd S. Chalmers Canadian Play Award.

In 1989 Native Earth created Weesageechak Begins to Dance an annual play festival which developed plays that often turned into full production the following year. One of the plays which was developed through this process was John McLeod's Diary of a Crazy Boy.

In 2012, the organization was described as "a formidable artistic hub for all things related to contemporary Indigenous performing arts."

In 2012, Native Earth moved their administrative headquarters to the Daniels Spectrum, an arts and cultural centre located in Toronto's revitalized Regent Park (part of the Regent Park Revitalization Plan). They also launched Aki Studio – a 120-seat creation and performance black box space located on the main floor of the Daniels Spectrum. The inaugural play staged in the new space was Dominion, a five-person play written by Canadian author Andréa Ledding. Aki Studio has hosted a variety of theater companies, primarily independent, Indigenous, or multicultural theatre companies; these include fu-Gen, Cahoots, Obsidian, The Musical Stage, Paper Canoe, and the Agokwe Collective.

== Artistic directors ==
- Denis Lacroix and Bunny Sicard (1982–1983)
- Monique Mojica (1983–1986)
- Tomson Highway (1986–1992)
- Floyd Favel (1992–1994)
- Drew Hayden Taylor (1994–1997)
- Pamela A. Matthews (Interim 1997-1998)
- Alejandro Ronceria, Sandra Laronde and Daniel David Moses (1998–2000)
- Alanis King (2000–2002)
- Doris Peltier, Glenn Shea and Marion De Vries (Interim 2002)
- Yvette Nolan (2003–2011)
- Tara Beagan (2011–2013)
- Ryan Cunningham (2014–2017)
- Keith Barker (2017–2022)
- Joelle Peters (2022−present)

== Managing Directors ==
- Himanshu Sitlani (2022–Present)
- Isaac Thomas (2012–2022)
- Donna-Michelle St. Bernard (2003–2012)
