= List of Canadian directors =

The following is a list of Canadian film, television and theatre directors, in alphabetical order.

== A ==
- Jennifer Abbott (documentary)
- Louise Abbott (documentary film)
- Sarah Abbott (film)
- Mark Achbar (film)
- Steve J. Adams (film)
- Patrick J. Adams (television)
- David Acomba
- Alfons Adetuyi (film, television)
- Robert Adetuyi (film)
- Brishkay Ahmed (documentary)
- Philip Akin (theatre)
- Atuat Akkitirq (film)
- Zaynê Akyol (documentary)
- Geneviève Albert (film)
- Clint Alberta (documentary film)
- Kim Albright (film)
- Martha Allan (theatre)
- Jennifer Alleyn (film)
- Paul Almond
- Joseph Amenta (film)
- Bonnie Ammaq (film)
- Janet Amos (theatre)
- John Murray Anderson (theatre)
- Robert Anderson (documentary)
- Irene Angelico (documentary)
- Catherine Annau (documentary)
- Denys Arcand (film)
- Louise Archambault (film)
- Sylvain Archambault (film, television)
- Kay Armatage (documentary)
- Aviva Armour-Ostroff (film, theatre)
- Alethea Arnaquq-Baril (documentary)
- Asinnajaq (film)
- Olivier Asselin (film)
- Robin Aubert (film)
- Christopher Auchter (documentary, animation)
- Albéric Aurtenèche (film)
- Roger Avary (film)
- Susan Avingaq (film)

== B ==
- Marina Rice Bader (film)
- Jennifer Baichwal (documentary)
- Norma Bailey (film, TV)
- Paule Baillargeon (film)
- David Baird (theatre)
- Gavin Baird (film)
- David Bairstow (documentary)
- Sumathy Balaram (film)
- Liza Balkan (theatre)
- Ara Ball (film)
- Tanya Ballantyne (documentary)
- Sofia Banzhaf (film)
- Manon Barbeau (documentary)
- Paul Barbeau (film)
- Anaïs Barbeau-Lavalette (film)
- Sarah Baril Gaudet (documentary)
- Keith Barker (theatre)
- Rodrigo Barriuso (film)
- Renny Bartlett (film)
- Jephté Bastien (film)
- Jérémie Battaglia (documentary)
- Ian Bawa (film)
- Michael Bawtree (theatre)
- Nicole Bazuin (documentary)
- Rafaël Beauchamp (film)
- Jean Beaudry (film)
- Renée Beaulieu (film)
- Jonathan Beaulieu-Cyr (film)
- Guy Beaulne (theatre)
- Sophie Bédard Marcotte (film)
- Maya Annik Bedward (film, TV, documentary)
- Keith Behrman (film, TV)
- Adam Belanger (film, theatre)
- Shane Belcourt (film)
- Jani Bellefleur-Kaltush (film)
- Hind Benchekroun (documentary)
- Jean-Pierre Bergeron (film, theatre)
- Brigitte Berman (film)
- Henry Bernadet (film)
- Zack Bernbaum (film)
- Attila Bertalan (film)
- Scott Beveridge (film, video art)
- Raoul Bhaneja (television)
- Julian Biggs (documentary)
- Vincent Biron (film)
- Roshell Bissett (film)
- Matt Bissonnette (film)
- Gilles Blais (documentary)
- Roger Blais (documentary)
- Annick Blanc (film)
- Renée Blanchar (documentary)
- Jack Blum (theatre)
- Sofia Bohdanowicz (film)
- Nicolas Bolduc (film)
- Peter Boretski (theatre, television)
- Osmond Borradaile (documentary)
- Clay Borris (film, television)
- Miryam Bouchard (film, television)
- Eric K. Boulianne (film)
- Luc Bourdon (documentary)
- Antoine Bourges (film)
- François Bouvier (film, television)
- Maureen Bradley (film)
- Kristof Brandl (film, music video)
- André Brassard (theatre, film)
- Jennifer Brewin (theatre)
- Manon Briand (film)
- Donald Brittain (documentary)
- Sandrine Brodeur-Desrosiers (film)
- Rex Bromfield (film, television)
- Daniel Brooks (theatre)
- Amnon Buchbinder (film)
- Adrian Buitenhuis (documentary)
- Penelope Buitenhuis (film, television)
- Alex Bulmer (theatre)
- Paul Buissonneau (theatre)
- Gary Burns (film)
- Andrea Bussmann (film)
- Jason Buxton (film)

== C ==
- Julien Cadieux (documentary)
- Liz Cairns (film)
- Jean-François Caissy (documentary)
- Terril Calder (animated film)
- Vivieno Caldinelli (film, television)
- Jorge Camarotti (film)
- James Cameron (film)
- Peg Campbell (film)
- Sterling Campbell (film)
- Tamo Campos (documentary)
- Romeo Candido (film, television, web series)
- Roger Cantin (film, television)
- Dominique Cardona (film, television)
- Hubert Caron-Guay (film, documentary)
- Louise Carré (film)
- Gabriel Carrer (film)
- Mélanie Carrier (documentary)
- Bruno Carrière (film, television)
- Peter Carter (film, television)
- Kirsten Carthew (film)
- Scott Cavalheiro (film)
- Kate Cayley (theatre)
- Catherine Chabot (film)
- Danic Champoux (documentary)
- Karen Chapman (film, television, documentary)
- Mélanie Charbonneau (film)
- Lyne Charlebois (film, music video)
- Miryam Charles (film)
- Shirley Cheechoo (film)
- Pier-Philippe Chevigny (film)
- Dominique Chila (film)
- Aisling Chin-Yee (film)
- Mary-Colin Chisholm (theatre)
- Monia Chokri (film)
- Lloyd Lee Choi (film)
- Cam Christiansen (animation)
- Al Christie
- Charles Christie
- Jerry Ciccoritti (film, stage, television)
- Chloé Cinq-Mars (film)
- Sean Cisterna (film)
- Andrew Cividino (film)
- Dane Clark (film)
- Millefiore Clarkes (film, music video)
- Mike Clattenburg (television)
- Zoe Cleland (theatre)
- Jim Cliffe (film, television)
- Michael Clowater (film)
- Sebastian Cluer (television)
- Egidio Coccimiglio (film)
- Daniel Cockburn (film)
- Joy Coghill (theatre)
- Sidney M. Cohen (television)
- Laurie Colbert (film)
- Randall Cole (film)
- Layne Coleman (film, theatre)
- Phil Comeau (film, television)
- Jérémy Comte (film)
- Jesse Thomas Cook (film)
- Marilyn Cooke (film)
- Guy L. Coté (documentary)
- Lawrence Côté-Collins (film)
- Marie-Hélène Cousineau (film)
- Jeanne Crépeau (film)
- Suzanne Crocker (documentary)
- Brandon Cronenberg (film)
- David Cronenberg (film)
- Seán Cummings (theatre)

== D ==
- Jamie M. Dagg (film)
- Reza Dahya (film)
- Zale Dalen (film, television)
- Tom Daly (documentary)
- Marie-Julie Dallaire (film)
- Francis Damberger (film, television)
- James Buddy Day (film, television, documentary)
- Deco Dawson (film)
- Luis De Filippis (film)
- Guillaume de Fontenay (film)
- Miranda de Pencier (film)
- Chris Deacon (film, television)
- Tracey Deer (television, film, documentary)
- Winston DeGiobbi (film)
- Michael Del Monte (documentary)
- Claude Demers (documentary)
- Joshua Demers (film)
- Mathieu Denis (film)
- Paul-Émile d'Entremont (documentary)
- Sophie Deraspe (film)
- Denys Desjardins (documentary)
- Richard Desjardins (documentary)
- Bernard Devlin (documentary)
- Seán Devlin (film)
- David Di Giovanni (film, theatre)
- Chris Di Staulo
- Guylaine Dionne (film)
- Xavier Dolan (film)
- Andrea Donaldson (theatre)
- Nicole Dorsey (film)
- Alexandre Dostie (film)
- Mike Downie (documentary)
- Michael Downing (film)
- Michael Dowse (film)
- Helen Doyle (documentary)
- Rosvita Dransfeld (documentary)
- Igor Drljaca (film)
- Justin Ducharme (film)
- Alexa-Jeanne Dubé (film, music video)
- Romain F. Dubois (film, music video)
- Félix Dufour-Laperrière (documentary, animation)
- Christian Duguay
- Geneviève Dulude-De Celles (film)
- Danny Dunlop (film)
- Katrina Dunn (theatre)
- Stephen Dunn (film)
- George Dunning (animation, documentary, film)
- Ashley Duong (documentary)
- Marie-Pier Dupuis (film)
- Sophie Dupuis (film)
- Yves Sioui Durand (film, theatre)
- Alexis Durand-Brault (film)
- Jean-Philippe Duval (television, film, documentary)
- Audrey Dwyer (theatre)
- Gaëlle d'Ynglemare (film)

== E ==
- Chris Earle (theatre)
- Gwaai Edenshaw (film)
- Guy Édoin (film)
- Martin Edralin (film)
- Atom Egoyan (film)
- Kris Elgstrand (film)
- Julien Élie (documentary)
- Halima Elkhatabi (film, documentary)
- Anne Émond (film)
- Bernard Émond (film)
- Danishka Esterhazy (film)
- Reese Eveneshen (film)
- Jesse Ewles (film)

== F ==
- Kevin Fair (film)
- Philippe Falardeau (film)
- Alexander Farah (film)
- Leonard Farlinger (film)
- Hossein Martin Fazeli
- Avi Federgreen (film)
- Donna Feore (theatre)
- Lynne Fernie (documentary)
- Lee Filipovski (film)
- David Findlay (film)
- Matt Finlin (documentary)
- Thom Fitzgerald (film)
- Ann Marie Fleming (film)
- Peter Foldy (film)
- Sarah Fortin (film)
- Tori Foster (documentary)
- Guillaume Fournier (documentary)
- Martin Fournier (documentary)
- Yves Christian Fournier
- Paul Fox (film, television)
- Graham Foy (film, music video; a/k/a Fantavious Fritz)
- Alexandre Franchi (film)
- Max Fraser (film)
- James Freer (film)
- Camelia Frieberg (film)
- William Fruet (film, theatre)
- Kevan Funk (film, music video)
- Kelly Fyffe-Marshall (film)

== G ==
- Philippe David Gagné (film, documentary)
- Lorena Gale (theatre)
- Sarah Galea-Davis (film)
- Simon Galiero (film)
- Pierre Gang (film, television)
- Sean Garrity (film)
- Connor Gaston (film)
- Patrick Gazé (film)
- Fran Gebhard (theatre)
- Shawn Gerrard (film, television)
- Serge Giguère (documentary)
- Malca Gillson (documentary)
- Simon Gionet (film)
- Jacques Giraldeau (documentary)
- Maxime Giroux (film)
- Yan Giroux (film)
- Grace Glowicki (film)
- Louis Godbout (film)
- Olivier Godin (film)
- Brooke Goldstein (film)
- Noam Gonick (film)
- Danis Goulet (film)
- Sophie Goyette (film)
- Ivan Grbovic (film)
- Anais Granofsky (film, television)
- Cynthia Grant (theatre)
- Philippe Grégoire (film)
- John Greyson (film)
- Daniel Grou (film)
- Paul Gury (film, theatre)
- German Gutierrez (documentary)

== H ==
- Brigitte Haentjens (theatre)
- Paul Haggis (film)
- Don Haldane (film, television)
- Meredith Hama-Brown (film)
- Jean-Sébastien Hamel (animation)
- Arthur Hammond (documentary)
- Rick Hancox (film)
- Bretten Hannam (film)
- Matthew Hannam (film)
- Amélie Hardy (documentary)
- Reginald Harkema (film)
- Ian Harnarine (film)
- Alicia K. Harris (film)
- John Kent Harrison (television)
- Mary Harron (film)
- Bobbi Jo Hart (documentary)
- Kevin Hartford (film)
- Gail Harvey (film, television)
- Kenneth J. Harvey (film)
- Jeremiah Hayes (documentary film and television)
- Xiaodan He (film)
- Karl R. Hearne (film)
- Catherine Hébert (documentary)
- Titus Heckel (film)
- Kevin Hegge (documentary)
- Sasha Leigh Henry (film, television)
- Kathleen Hepburn (film)
- Dale Heslip (documentary, music video)
- David Hewlett (film)
- Federico Hidalgo (film)
- Emma Higgins (film, music video)
- Olivier Higgins (documentary)
- Arthur Hiller (film)
- Andy Hines (film, music video)
- Julie Hivon (film, television)
- Bryce Hodgson (film, theatre)
- Mars Horodyski (film, television)
- Emanuel Hoss-Desmarais (film)
- Pierre Houle (film, television)
- John Howe (documentary)
- Michèle Hozer (documentary)
- Tiffany Hsiung (documentary)
- Rémy Huberdeau (film)
- Andrew Huculiak (film)
- Andrew Hull

== I ==
- Madeline Ivalu (film)
- Julia Ivanova (documentary)

== J ==
- Douglas Jackson
- Michael Jacot
- Tanja Jacobs (theatre)
- Dominic James (film)
- François Jaros (film, television)
- Naomi Jaye (film)
- Kathleen Jayme (documentary)
- Katherine Jerkovic (film)
- Slater Jewell-Kemker (film)
- Norman Jewison (film)
- Renuka Jeyapalan (film, television)
- Brian D. Johnson (documentary)
- Evan Johnson (film)
- Galen Johnson (film)
- Matt Johnson (film, television)
- Stephanie Joline (film, television)
- Adam Garnet Jones (film)
- Ronalda Jones (theatre)
- Scott Jones (film)
- Meryam Joobeur (film)
- Aida Jordão (theatre)
- Édith Jorisch (film)
- Chase Joynt (documentary)
- Marie-Ève Juste (film)
- Claude Jutra (film)

== K ==
- Zarrar Kahn (film)
- Kalainithan Kalaichelvan (film)
- Yuqi Kang (documentary)
- Yassmina Karajah (film)
- Vinnie Karetak (film)
- Jamie Kastner (film)
- John Kastner (film)
- Jillian Keiley (theatre)
- Olivier Kemeid (theatre)
- Elza Kephart (film)
- Shervin Kermani (film)
- Sami Khan (film)
- Alireza Khatami (film)
- Gloria Ui Young Kim (film, television)
- Allan King (film, television)
- Albert Kish (documentary)
- Bonnie Sherr Klein (film)
- Jesse Noah Klein (film)
- Joey Klein (film)
- Helene Klodawsky (documentary)
- Julien Knafo (film)
- Larysa Kondracki (film)
- Jules Arita Koostachin (film, television)
- Ted Kotcheff (film, television)
- Anthony Kramreither (film)
- Nicolas Krief (film)
- Srinivas Krishna (film)
- Roman Kroitor (documentary)
- Carol Kunnuk (documentary)
- Zacharias Kunuk (film)
- Julia Kwan (film)
- Ky Nam Le Duc (film)
- Kunsang Kyirong (film)

== L ==
- Bruce LaBruce (film)
- Maxime Lacoste-Lebuis (documentary)
- Stéphane Lafleur (film)
- Florence Lafond (film)
- Jean-Daniel Lafond (documentary)
- David Lafontaine (film, theatre)
- Carole Laganière (documentary)
- Ian Lagarde (film)
- Patrice Laliberté (film, television)
- Jeremy Lalonde (film)
- Michel Langlois (film)
- Yan Lanouette Turgeon (film, television)
- Stéphane Lapointe (film)
- Martin Laroche (film)
- Jeremy Larter (film)
- Hugo Latulippe (documentary)
- Pier-Luc Latulippe (documentary)
- Jean-Claude Lauzon (film)
- Isabelle Lavigne (documentary)
- Simon Lavoie (film)
- Ruth Lawrence (film, theatre)
- Elizabeth Lazebnik (film)
- Walter Learning
- Jean-François Leblanc (film)
- Jeanne Leblanc (film)
- Francis Leclerc (film)
- John L'Ecuyer (film, television)
- Gerald L'Ecuyer (film, television)
- Sherren Lee (film, television)
- Sook-Yin Lee (film)
- Maryse Legagneur (film)
- Catherine Legault (documentary)
- Renaud Lessard (film)
- Shawn Levy (film, television)
- Marc-Antoine Lemire (film)
- Marquise Lepage (film)
- Robert Lepage (film, theatre)
- Chloé Leriche (film)
- Jean-François Lesage (documentary)
- Philippe Lesage (film)
- Chandler Levack (film, music video)
- Laurence Lévesque (documentary)
- Richard J. Lewis
- Yonah Lewis
- David Lickley (documentary)
- Arnold Lim (film)
- Desiree Lim
- Drew Lint (film)
- Arthur Lipsett (experimental)
- Jason Loftus (documentary)
- James Long (theatre)
- Juliette Lossky (film)
- Ariane Louis-Seize (film)
- José Lourenço (film, music video)
- Colin Low (documentary)
- Frieda Luk (film)
- Philippe Lupien (film)
- Kate Lushington (theatre)
- Kate Lynch
- Peter Lynch
- Laurie Lynd (film, television)

== M ==
- Johnny Ma (film)
- Michael Mabbott (film, television)
- Guy Maddin (film)
- Adam MacDonald
- Shane MacDougall
- Jenna MacMillan (film)
- Adriana Maggs (film, television)
- Michèle Magny (theatre)
- Gilles Maheu (theatre)
- Jonah Malak (documentary)
- Émilie Mannering (film)
- Julien G. Marcotte (film)
- Jen Markowitz (film, television)
- Leon Marr (film, television)
- Catherine Martin (film)
- Asghar Massombagi (film)
- Yasmine Mathurin (film)
- Samuel Matteau (documentary)
- Gail Maurice (film)
- Blake Mawson (film)
- Jackie Maxwell (theatre)
- Alison McAlpine (documentary)
- Robert McCallum (documentary)
- Bruce McDonald (film, television)
- Molly McGlynn (film, television)
- Don McKellar (film, television)
- Ryan McKenna (film)
- Gillian McKercher (film)
- Norman McLaren (film)
- Chelsea McMullan (film)
- Michael McNamara (film, television, documentary)
- Isiah Medina (film)
- Stella Meghie
- Deepa Mehta (film)
- Dilip Mehta
- Richie Mehta (film)
- André Melançon (film, television)
- Robert Ménard (film)
- Sean Menard (documentary)
- Santiago Menghini (film)
- Constant Mentzas (film)
- Sami Mermer (documentary)
- Marianne Métivier (film)
- Brenda Michell (documentary)
- Amy Miller (film)
- Jacquelyn Mills (documentary)
- Pat Mills (film)
- Clara Milo (film)
- Peter Mishara (documentary)
- Michelle Mohabeer (film)
- Andrew Moir (documentary)
- Robert Monderie (documentary)
- Pavan Moondi (film, television)
- Grayson Moore (film)
- Faran Moradi (film, television)
- Michel Moreau (documentary)
- Robert Morin (film)
- Wendy Morgan (film, television, music video)
- Nathan Morlando (film)
- James Motluk (film, television)
- Jasmin Mozaffari (film)
- Grant Munro (animation, documentary)
- Janet Munsil (theatre)
- Ron Murphy (film, television)
- Alexandra Myotte (animation)

== N ==
- Kaveh Nabatian (film, music video)
- Ruba Nadda (film)
- Samer Najari (film)
- Shasha Nakhai (film)
- Darlene Naponse (film)
- Ariel Nasr (documentary)
- Vincenzo Natali (film)
- Sergio Navarretta (film)
- Will Niava (film)
- Aubrey Nealon (film, television)
- Kim Nguyen (film)
- Wanda Nolan (film, documentary)
- Yannick Nolin (documentary)
- Diane Nyland Proctor (theatre)

== O ==
- Justin Oakey (film)
- Melanie Oates (film)
- Alanis Obomsawin (documentary)
- Diane Obomsawin (animation)
- Hugh O'Connor (documentary)
- Terrance Odette (film, television)
- Charles Officer (film)
- Linda Ohama (film)
- Randall Okita (film)
- Sidney Olcott
- Taylor Olson (film)
- Rafaël Ouellet (film)
- Don Owen (documentary, film)

== P ==
- Indrani Pal-Chaudhuri (film, TV)
- Alisa Palmer (theatre)
- John Palmer (film, theatre)
- Ally Pankiw (film, television)
- Kire Paputts (film)
- Henri Pardo (film)
- Salar Pashtoonyar (film)
- Sanjay Patel
- Steve Patry (documentary)
- Corey Payette (film, theatre)
- Bec Pecaut (film)
- Zoé Pelchat (film)
- Gabriel Pelletier (film, television)
- François Péloquin (film, television)
- Nadine Pequeneza (documentary)
- Nicolás Pereda (film)
- Arturo Pérez Torres (film)
- Ben Petrie (film)
- Carmine Pierre-Dufour (film)
- Ileana Pietrobruno
- Benoît Pilon
- Sébastien Pilote (film)
- Noah Pink
- Pedro Pires
- Bruce Pittman (film)
- Pascal Plante (film)
- Maude Plante-Husaruk (documentary)
- Serville Poblete (film)
- Maurice Podbrey (theatre)
- Jeremy Podeswa (film, TV)
- Anne Claire Poirier (film)
- Sarah Polley (film)
- Léa Pool (film)
- Gerald Potterton (animation, film)
- Paul David Power (theatre)
- Michel Poulette (film, TV)
- Brigitte Poupart (film)
- Jason Priestley
- Gregory Prest (theatre)
- François Prévost (documentary)
- Will Prosper (documentary)
- Ben Proudfoot (documentary film)
- Raymonde Provencher (documentary)
- Alex Pugsley (film)

== Q ==
- Troy Quane (film)

== R ==
- Jared Raab (film, television, music video)
- Tom Radford (documentary film and television)
- Matthew Rankin (film)
- Mort Ransen (film)
- Benjamin Ratner (film)
- Ryan Redford (film)
- Samir Rehem (film, television)
- Kim Renders (theatre)
- Vincent René-Lortie (film, music video)
- Ivan Reitman (film)
- Jason Reitman (film)
- Maxim Rheault (film)
- Boyce Richardson (documentary)
- Kyle Rideout (film)
- Velcrow Ripper (documentary film)
- Diane Roberts (theatre)
- Bill Robertson (film)
- Daniel Roby (film)
- Lina Rodriguez (film)
- Daniel Roher (documentary)
- Sophy Romvari (film)
- Les Rose (film, television)
- Richard Rose (theatre, film)
- Sébastien Rose (film)
- Jean-Marc E. Roy (film, documentary)
- Patricia Rozema (film)
- Baņuta Rubess (theatre)
- Lisa Rubin (theatre)
- Pedro Ruiz (documentary)
- Su Rynard (documentary)
- Matthieu Rytz (documentary)

== S ==
- Ava Maria Safai (film)
- Louis Saia (film, television, theatre)
- Jeffrey St. Jules (film)
- Elizabeth St. Philip (documentary)
- Annie St-Pierre (film)
- Nathalie Saint-Pierre (film)
- Jacob Sampson (theatre)
- Claire Sanford (film)
- Brigitte Sauriol (film)
- Patrice Sauvé (film, television)
- Mark Sawers (film, television)
- Shelley Saywell (documentary)
- Jeremy Schaulin-Rioux (film, music video)
- Peter Scriver (film)
- Seth Scriver (film)
- David Secter (film)
- Mack Sennett (film)
- Roshan Sethi (film)
- Nik Sexton (film, television)
- Arshia Shakiba (film)
- Paul Shapiro (film, television)
- Andrew Shaver (theatre)
- Kathryn Shaw (theatre)
- Bashar Shbib (film)
- Donald Shebib (film)
- Domee Shi (film)
- Anthony Shim (film)
- Albert Shin (film)
- Paul Shkordoff (film)
- Albert Shin (film, television)
- Aidan Shipley (film)
- Ben Shirinian (film, music video)
- Mina Shum (film)
- Lois Siegel (documentary)
- Scott Simpson (film, television, music video)
- Anne-Marie Sirois (film)
- Lenin M. Sivam (film)
- Mark Slutsky (film)
- Dylan Akio Smith (film)
- Scott Smith (film)
- Adam Smoluk
- Jonathan Sobol (film)
- Mani Soleymanlou (theatre)
- Frances-Anne Solomon (film)
- Sinakson Trevor Solway (documentary)
- Warren P. Sonoda (film, television)
- Christian Sparkes (film)
- Greg Spottiswood (film, theatre)
- Roger Spottiswoode (film, television)
- John Spotton (documentary)
- Lib Spry (theatre)
- Robin Spry (documentary, film)
- Yael Staav (film, television)
- Tank Standing Buffalo (animation)
- John Stark (film, theatre)
- Linsey Stewart (film)
- Lynne Stopkewich (film, television)
- Brett Story (documentary)
- Chris Strikes (film)
- Sudz Sutherland (film, television)
- Michèle Stephenson (film)
- Ginny Stikeman
- Danièle J. Suissa (film, television)
- Oana Suteu Khintirian (documentary)
- Matthew Swanson (film)
- Bruce Sweeney (film)

== T ==
- Eli Jean Tahchi (documentary)
- Elle-Máijá Tailfeathers (film)
- Katie Tallo (film, television)
- Jonathan Tammuz
- Paul Tana (film)
- Virginia Tangvald (documentary)
- Jordan Tannahill (film, theatre)
- Amanda Tapping (television)
- Emmanuel Tardif (film)
- Henry Tarvainen (theatre)
- Éric Tessier (film, television)
- Calvin Thomas (film)
- Eva Thomas (film, television)
- Madison Thomas (film)
- Paul Thompson
- Kelly Thornton (theatre)
- Vincent Toi (film)
- Michael Toledano (documentary)
- Paul Tom (documentary)
- Thyrone Tommy (film)
- Laurie Townshend (film, documentary)
- Sébastien Trahan (documentary film and television)
- Ian Tuason (film)
- Aren X. Tulchinsky
- Marie-Hélène Turcotte (film)
- André Turpin (film)
- Terry Tweed (theatre)
- Charlie Tyrell (film, music video)

== U ==
- David Uloth (film)
- Natar Ungalaaq (film)
- Allan Ungar

== V ==
- Esther Valiquette (documentary)
- Jean-Marc Vallée (film)
- Gabriela Osio Vanden (documentary)
- John Varszegi (film, theatre)
- Ingrid Veninger (film)
- Rhayne Vermette (film)
- Robert Verrall (documentary)
- Myriam Verreault (film)
- Marie-Hélène Viens (film)
- Adrian Villagomez (music video)
- Denis Villeneuve (film)
- Martin Villeneuve (film)
- Salomé Villeneuve (film)
- Mary Vingoe (theatre)
- Clement Virgo (film)
- Werner Volkmer (documentary)
- Wiebke von Carolsfeld (film)

== W ==
- Kristina Wagenbauer (film)
- Casey Walker (film, television)
- John Walker (documentary)
- Cole Walliser (commercial, music video)
- Wayne Wapeemukwa (film)
- Darrell Wasyk (film)
- Ross Weber (film)
- Lulu Wei (documentary)
- Jeth Weinrich (music video, documentary)
- Ali Weinstein (documentary)
- Larry Weinstein (documentary)
- Jack Weisman (documentary)
- Aerlyn Weissman (documentary)
- David Wellington (film)
- Peter Wellington (film)
- Ron Weyman (documentary, television)
- Anne Wheeler (film)
- Maureen White (theatre)
- Sherry White (film, television)
- Jennifer Wickham (documentary)
- Richie Wilcox (theatre)
- Leighton Alexander Williams (film, webseries, theatre)
- Nigel Shawn Williams (theatre)
- Jennie Williams (documentary)
- Rich Williamson (film)
- David Winning (film, television)
- Joyce Wong (film, television)

== Y ==
- Gary Yates
- Michael Yerxa (documentary)
- Jerome Yoo (film)
- Mayumi Yoshida (film)
- Aleysa Young (television)
- Asia Youngman (film, television)

== Z ==
- John Zaritsky (documentary)
- Joseph Ziegler (theatre)
- Sanja Živković (film)
- Aziz Zoromba (film)
- Svetlana Zylin (theatre)

== See also ==
- List of Canadian actors
- List of Canadian writers
- List of Canadian comedians
- List of Canadian musicians
- List of Canadian artists
