= Company of Sirens =

Canadian theatre company

- Formation: 1986
- Type: Theatre group
- Purpose: Feminist theatre
- Location: Toronto, Ontario, Canada
- Members: Lina Chartrand; Shawna Dempsey; Catherine Glen; Cynthia Grant; Aida Jordão; Lib Spry

Company of Sirens is a Canadian feminist theatre company formed in 1986. Company of Sirens developed the feminist play The Working People's Picture Show.

== History ==
Company of Sirens was officially founded in 1986 by Lina Chartrand, Aida Jordão, Catherine Glen, Lib Spry, Shawna Dempsey, and Cynthia Grant. Grant came to work with the new company after leaving Nightwood Theatre to work with a theatre that was more political and had more of a collective structure. The women founded Company of Sirens after coming together to work on a commission from Organized Working Women.

The Working People's Picture Show (WPPS) was commissioned by Organized Working Women in 1985 to celebrate their 10th anniversary and began as a ten-minute piece. The show developed into a full-length play and subsequently toured Ontario. In 1987, they performed WPPS on International Women's Day with sponsorship from Canadian Action for Nicaragua and the March 8 Coalition. Company of Sirens continued to perform WPPS in various contexts for at least six years after its premiere. Lois Sweet of the Toronto Star described WPPS as "blatantly pro-union [and] pro-feminist".

In 1991, Company of Sirens received a $12,500 grant from Metro Toronto's arts budget. This funding was criticized by Toronto Star arts critic, Gina Mallet, whom the company felt to have a prejudice against small, independent, theatre.

== Production history ==
1987

- The Working People's Picture Show

1988

- The Working People's Picture Show at From The Ground theatre festival

1990

- Shelter From Assault, as part of a fundraiser for The Denise House

1991

- Djuna: What of the Night written and directed by Cynthia Grant and Svetlana Zylin
- Whenever I Feel Afraid

1992

- Penelope by Margaret Atwood, Cynthia Grant, Peggy Sample, and Susan Seagrove

1993

- Little Miss Easter Seals written by Lina Chartrand, directed by Cynthia Grant

1994

- The Catharine Wheel written by Ingrid MacDonald, directed by Cynthia Grant, show co-sponsored by Buddies In Bad Times

1996

- A Canadian Monsoon written and directed by Sheila James

1998

- The Destruction of Eve by Svetlana Zylin

== Awards ==
Year	Award	Category	Work	Result	Notes	Ref.
1991	Dora Mavor Moore Awards - Theatre for Young Audiences	Outstanding Performance by a Female	Whenever I Feel Afraid	Nominated	for Ellen Ray Hennesey	
1998	Dora Mavor Moore Awards - Independent Theatre	Outstanding Sound or Music	The Destruction of Eve	Nominated	for Connie Kaldor and David Sereda	
1998	Dora Mavor Moore Awards - Independent Theatre	Outstanding Production	The Destruction of Eve	Nominated		

== Notable performers ==
- Susan Hogan (Djuna: What of the Night - 1991)
- Henriette Ivanens (Little Miss Easter Seals - 1993)
- Kim Renders (Djuna: What of the Night - 1991)
- Shakura S'Aida (The Destruction of Eve - 1998)
