= Varszegi =

Varszegi or Várszegi is a surname. Notable people with the surname include:

- John Varszegi, Canadian screenwriter, film director and cinematographer
- József Várszegi (1910–1977), Hungarian javelin thrower
- Károly Várszegi (1943–1999), Hungarian film director and cinematographer
