= Susan Hogan (actress) =

Canadian actress

- Born: 1948 (age 76–77); Scarborough, Ontario, Canada
- Occupation: Actress
- Years active: 1976–present
- Spouse: Michael Hogan
- Children: 3, including Gabriel

Susan Hogan (born 1948) is a Canadian film, television and stage actress.

== Background ==
Born and raised in Scarborough, Ontario, she chose to pursue acting as a career after being cast as Abigail in her high school production of The Crucible. She attended the National Theatre School of Canada beginning in 1966. After graduating, she began appearing in theatre productions in Toronto and at the Stratford Festival, although due to her blonde, green-eyed beauty she became typecast in ingenue roles until breaking through to wider notice as Stas in a 1978 production of Pam Gems's play Dusa, Fish, Stas and Vi.

== Career ==
In 1979, The Globe and Mail theatre critic Bryan Johnson named Hogan one of the year's best actresses for her performance in John Murrell's Waiting for the Parade.

In 1981, she injured her knee during a preview performance as Kate in a production of The Taming of the Shrew. Although forced to withdraw from a handful of performances, she was able to return to the role.

In 1983, Hogan and her husband Michael Hogan starred together in the CBC Television miniseries Vanderberg as Hank Vanderberg, a Calgary oil magnate, and his wife Elizabeth. In 1991, Hogan appeared in Cynthia Grant and Svetlana Zylin's Djuna: What of the Night with Company of Sirens in Toronto, Ontario.

In 1985, although Gabrielle Lazure physically portrayed the role of Pauline Shapiro in Joshua Then and Now, Hogan overdubbed her voice due to Lazure's lingering Québécois accent. In the same year, she began appearing as Nicole in the drama series Night Heat.

Other roles around this time included Rolling Vengeance, the television film Easy Prey and a guest appearance in Street Legal, while her stage roles included a First Nations spirit in Linda Griffiths's Jessica, Marjorie in a production of William Mastrosimone's Extremities, and as Matilda, opposite her husband as Zastrozzi, in George F. Walker's Zastrozzi, The Master of Discipline. However, two weeks into the run of Extremities, she was forced to withdraw from the role after suffering whiplash during the play's opening rape scene, and was replaced by Arlene Mazerolle for the remainder of the show's run.

In 1988, she was a guest co-host of CTV's talk show Lifetime for a week during regular host Liz Grogan's pregnancy leave. Other guest hosts included Maureen McTeer, Dinah Christie and Jayne Eastwood.

In 1989, Hogan appeared in a production of Byron Ayanoglu's Anarchy, was cast in the film Narrow Margin, and filmed an episode of Danger Bay which was planned as a potential backdoor pilot for a new series that would star Hogan as a television journalist and single mother. The series was not picked up.

In 1991, Hogan appeared in her most noted film role, as Marlene in Bordertown Café. In 1993 and 1994, she appeared in the television soap opera Family Passions.

In 1995, she played Regan in a partially gender-reversed production of King Lear, in which Janet Wright played the lead role.

== Awards ==
In 1998, she garnered a Jessie Richardson Theatre Award nomination for her performance as Lonnie in a production of Michael MacLennan's Grace. She was nominated in the same category in 2000 for playing Ruella in Alan Ayckbourn's Communicating Doors. She has also received three Leo Award nominations, for Best Actress in a Film in 1998 for Rupert's Land, Best Actress in a Dramatic Series in 1998 for Dead Man's Gun, and Best Supporting Actress in a Film in 2005 for Marker.

== Personal life ==
Susan and Michael Hogan have three children, all of whom are actors; Jennie Rebecca Hogan (born in 1971), Gabriel Hogan (born in 1973) and Charlie Hogan (born in 1983).

== Filmography ==
=== Film ===
- 1976: A Sweeter Song – Linda
- 1978: I Miss You, Hugs and Kisses – Secretary
- 1979: The Brood – Ruth Mayer
- 1979: Title Shot – Sylvia
- 1980: Phobia – Jenny St. Clair
- 1987: Rolling Vengeance – Big Joe's Wife, Kathy Rosso
- 1990: Narrow Margin – Kathryn Weller
- 1991: White Fang – Belinda
- 1992: Impolite – Dr. Gloria Sardone
- 1992: Bordertown Café – Marlene
- 1998: Disturbing Behavior – Cynthia Clark
- 1998: Rupert's Land – Trudy
- 2000: Legs Apart (short) – Jeannie
- 2006: The Butterfly Effect 2 – Katherine Larson
- 2006: Everything's Gone Green – Ryan's Mom
- 2018: Elsewhere – Mae Sawyer
- 2023: Virgin River

=== Television ===
Susan Hogan television credits
Year	Title	Role	Notes	Ref.
1979	An American Christmas Carol	Helen Brewster	TV movie	
1981, 1985	The Littlest Hobo	Reporter / Meg Farrell	3 episodes	
1983	Vanderberg	Elizabeth Vanderberg	TV miniseries	
1985	Oakmount High	Carol Webber	Television film	
1985–1987	The Little Vampire	Helga Besker	7 episodes	
1985–1989	Night Heat	Nicole "Nickie" Rimbaud	95 episodes	
1986	Easy Prey	Carol Risico	TV movie	
1987	Street Legal	Ruby	1 episode	
1989	Alfred Hitchcock Presents	Joyce Martin	1 episode	
1990	Danger Bay	Allison Walker	1 episode	
1990, 1992	Counterstrike	Bridgette	Episodes: "A Little Purity" (S1.E6) & "Bosnian Connection" (S3.E12)	
1993	Liar, Liar: Between Father and Daughter	Helen Browne	TV movie	
1993	Kung Fu: The Legend Continues	Nurse Beaman	1 episode	
1993–1994	Family Passions	Libby McDeere		
1994	Race to Freedom: The Underground Railroad	Unknown	TV movie	
1994	Thicker Than Blood: The Larry McLinden Story	Dr Sandra Baldwin	TV movie	
1995	No Greater Love	Kate Winfield	TV movie	
1995	Visitors of the Night	Dr Dillard	TV movie	
1995	Ebbie	Mrs Dobson	TV movie	
1996	Closer and Closer	Unknown	TV movie	
1996	Golden Will: The Silken Laumann Story	Marilyn Copeland	TV movie	
1996	In Cold Blood	Marie Dewey	TV miniseries	
1996, 1998	The Outer Limits	Phoebe Collins / Dr. Marissa Golding / Krenn	3 episodes	
1997	When Danger Follows You Home	Alicia	TV movie	
1998	Dead Man's Gun	Sister Katherine	Episode: "Sisters of Mercy"	
1999	Millennium	Una Saxum	1 episode	
2000	A Father's Choice	Gayle Miller	TV movie	
2000	Take Me Home: The John Denver Story	Irma	TV movie	
2000	Quarantine	Maddy Kempbers	TV movie	
2001	Mysterious Ways	Carol	1 episode	
2004-2006	The L Word	Sharon Fairbanks	6 episodes	
2005	Saving Milly	Senator Bates	TV movie	
2005	Hush	Florence	TV movie	
2005	Amber Frey: Witness for the Prosecution	Sharon Rocha	TV movie	
2006	Murder on Pleasant Drive	Fran Smith	TV movie	
2007	Cleaverville	Maggie Quinn	TV movie	
2007	Crossroads: A Story of Forgiveness	Principal Warren	TV movie	
2007	It Was One of Us	Mrs. Monroe	TV movie	
2007	Men in Trees	Donna Harrington	1 episode	
2007–2009	Battlestar Galactica	Captain Doyle Franks	3 episodes	
2008	Whispers and Lies	Dr. Faye Croft	TV movie	
2010	Lies Between Friends	Rebecca Read	TV movie	
2010–2011	Life Unexpected	Ellen Bazile	3 episodes	
2011	Three Weeks, Three Kids	Kathryn Mills	TV movie	
2011	Gone	Louise Turner	TV movie	
2011	Heartland	Grace Morris	1 episode	
2011	The Pastor's Wife	Dr. Lynn Zager	TV movie	
2012	A Very Merry Mix-Up	Penny	TV movie	
2012	It's Christmas, Carol!	Linda Huffler	TV movie	
2014	The Color of Rain	Michael's Mother Jill	TV movie	
2014	The Christmas Secret	Judy	TV movie	
2016	Hailey Dean Mystery: Murder, with Love	Elizabeth Dean	TV movie	
2016	The Wedding March	Nora Winters	TV movie	
2016	Christmas List	Cathy	TV movie	
2017	Garage Sale Mystery: The Art of Murder	Elizabeth Mellon	TV movie	
2017	Hailey Dean Mystery: Dating is Murder	Elizabeth Dean	TV movie	
2018	Frozen in Love	Kate Campbell	TV movie	
2018	Wedding March 3: Here Comes the Bride	Nora Winters	TV movie	
2018	Christmas Joy	Shirley Andrews	TV movie	
2018	A Twist of Christmas	Abby's Mother	TV movie	
2018	Welcome to Christmas	Nell	TV movie	
2018	Time for Me to Come Home for Christmas	Mae	TV movie	
2018–2019	DC's Legend of Tomorrow	Dorothy Heywood	4 episodes	
2019	My One & Only	Ruth Fletcher	TV movie	
2021	Sealed with a Kiss: Wedding March 6	Nora	TV movie	
2021	Supergirl	Miss Hochschild	1 episode	
2022	Harmony from the Heart	May Anne Carver	TV movie	
