= Leslee =

Leslee may refer to

- Leslee Feldman, studio head of casting
- Leslee Silverman, Canadian theater director
- Leslee Smith, British Virgin Islands basketball player
- Leslee Subak, American urogynecologist and reproductive surgeon
- Leslee Udwin, British filmmaker
- Leslee Unruh, Activist
- Leslee Milam Post, American politician
