= Shakura S'Aida =

Canadian singer

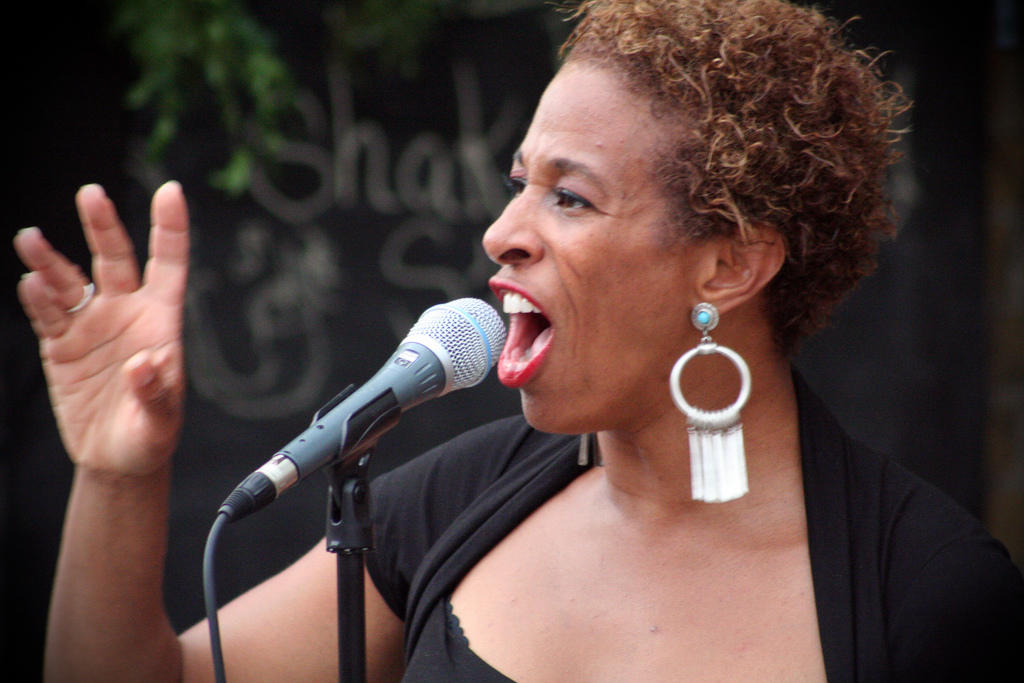

Background information
- Born: Brooklyn, New York, U.S.
- Genres: Blues
- Occupation(s): Singer, actress
- Labels: Electro-Fi, Ruf

Shakura S'Aida is a Canadian blues vocalist, songwriter and actress. She is sometimes credited Shakura.

== History ==
Shakura S'Aida was born in Brooklyn and lived in Switzerland before moving to Canada.

S'Aida was lead singer of the 13-piece world music ensemble Kaleefah, before embarking on her solo career. She has also performed as a backing vocalist for Rita MacNeil and Patti LaBelle, as well as with jazz musicians such as Jimmy Smith and Ruth Brown. She has also been nominated for several Juno Awards for her music.

S'Aida independently released her first solo album, Blueprint, in 2008. Her second album, Brown Sugar, was released in 2010 on Ruf Records. In 2012, she released a double CD, Time, on Electro-Fi Records.

As an actress, she starred in a Toronto production of George Boyd's Consecrated Ground in 2004, as well as Sudz Sutherland's Doomstown in 2006 and Sharon Lewis's film Brown Girl Begins in 2018.

In 2013, she was nominated for a Blues Music Award in the 'Contemporary Blues Female Artist' category.

== Discography ==
- Blueprint (2008, independent)
- Brown Sugar (2010, Ruf)
- Time (2012, Electro-Fi)

== Filmography ==
=== Film ===
Year	Title	Role	Notes
1995	First Degree	Ella Rodie	
1996	Talk to Me	Scarecrow	
1996	Critical Choices	Mother	
1999	A Map of the World	Guard	
2000	Livin' for Love: The Natalie Cole Story	Backup singer (as Shakura S'Aida)	
2006	Doomstown	Karen Twisleton	
2007	A Winter Tale	Charmaine	
2017	Whitewash	The Narrator (voice)	Video documentary
2017	Brown Girl Begins	Mami	

=== Television ===
Year	Title	Role	Notes
2000	Falcone	The Waitress	Series
2005	Kevin Hill	Jury Foreman	Series
2007	The Jane Show	Lillian	Series
2008	Flashpoint	Jackie	Series
2009	'Da Kink in My Hair	Shirley Andrews	Series
2010–2011	Turbo Dogs	Marlene	Series
2012	The Firm	Researcher	Series
2013	CBC Music Festival	Herself	TV special
2010–2015	Lost Girl	Dark Fae Elder	Series
2015	Saving Hope	Cora Boullot	Series
2016–2017	Schitt's Creek	Lena	Series
2021–present	Batwoman	Cora Lewis	Season Two

=== Theatre ===
Year	Title	Role	Notes	Source
1998	The Destruction of Eve (by Svetlana Zylin and Connie Kaldor)	Unknown	with Company of Sirens	

== Awards and nominations ==
Year	Award	Category	Result	Reference
1993	Juno Awards of 1993	Best World Music Artist/Band	Nominated	
2004	Maple Blues Award	Female Vocalist of the Year	Nominated	
2005	Maple Blues Award	Female Vocalist of the Year	Nominated	
2007	Maple Blues Award	Entertainer of the Year	Nominated	
2007	Maple Blues Award	Female Vocalist of the Year	Nominated	
2008	Maple Blues Award	Female Vocalist of the Year	Nominated	
2009	Maple Blues Award	Entertainer of the Year	Nominated	
2009	Maple Blues Award	Female Vocalist of the Year	Nominated	
2010	Maple Blues Award	Entertainer of the Year	Nominated	
2010	Maple Blues Award	Female Vocalist of the Year	Won	
2010	Maple Blues Award	Recording of the Year (for Brown Sugar (Ruf Records))	Nominated	
2011	Maple Blues Award	Entertainer of the Year	Nominated	
2011	Maple Blues Award	Female Vocalist of the Year	Nominated	
2012	Maple Blues Award	Entertainer of the Year	Nominated	
2012	Maple Blues Award	Female Vocalist of the Year	Nominated	
2012	Maple Blues Award	Songwriter of the Year (with Donna Grantis)	Nominated	
2012	Maple Blues Award	Recording of the year (for Time (Electro-Fi Records), with Howard Ayee)	Nominated	
2013	Juno Awards of 2013	Best Blues Album of the Year	Nominated	
2013	Blues Music Awards	Contemporary Female Artist	Nominated	
2013	Maple Blues Award	Entertainer of the Year	Nominated	
2013	Maple Blues Award	Female Vocalist of the Year	Nominated	
2014	Maple Blues Award	Entertainer of the Year	Nominated	
2014	Maple Blues Award	Female Vocalist of the Year	Nominated	
2015	Maple Blues Award	Female Vocalist of the Year	Nominated	
2016	Maple Blues Award	Female Vocalist of the Year	Nominated	
2017	Maple Blues Award	Female Vocalist of the Year	Nominated	
2023	Juno Awards of 2023	Best Contemporary Roots Album of the Year	Nominated	
