= Bruce Carlson =

Bruce Carlson may refer to:

- Bruce A. Carlson (born 1949), United States Air Force general
- Bruce Carlson (composer) (born 1944), Canadian composer
- Bruce A. Carlson (zoologist)
