= Lina Chartrand =

Canadian writer and theatre creator (1948–1994)

- Born: June 10, 1948; Timmins, Ontario
- Died: April 2, 1994 (aged 45)
- Education: Queen's University (B.A.)

Lina Chartrand (June 10, 1948 – April 2, 1994) was a Canadian writer and theatre creator. She was a co-founder of the feminist theatre company, Company of Sirens. Her most famous work was the bilingual and partly autobiographical play, La P'tite Miss Easter Seals.

== Early life ==
Chartrand was born in 1948 in Timmins, Ontario, Canada, one of four children of Leo and Leocadie Chartland. At sixteen months old, she contracted polio which resulted in her requiring spinal surgery at age 10, following which Chartrand spent time in a full body cast. In 1960, Chartrand was selected as Little Miss Easter Seals.

Chartrand attended Queen's University in Kingston, Ontario, where she received a B.A. in drama.

== Career ==
In 1986, Chartrand formed the feminist theatre collective Company of Sirens, with Aida Jordão, Catherine Glen, Lib Spry, Shawna Dempsey, and Cynthia Grant. With Company of Sirens, Chartrand co-created the play, The Working People's Picture Show.

Chartrand's first play, La P'tite Miss Easter Seals, premiered in 1988 with Theatre Francais at the Harbourfront Centre's du Maurier Theatre. She worked on the play for three years with consultation from John Van Burek. La P'tite Miss Easer Seals, partly inspired by Chartrand's childhood, is set on a train from Timmins to Toronto and centres on fifteen-year-old Little Miss Easter Seals, Monique Latremouille, who is travelling with her mother and cousin. Monique has spent six months in a full body cast after a spinal surgery to correct effects of childhood polio. The play's characters switch frequently between speaking French and English. La P'tite Miss Easter Seals was re-staged in 1993 by Company of Sirens at Tarragon Theatre's Extra Space.

Chartrand directed Helen Porter's My Father Taught Me To Swim in 1991 at the Annex Theatre. In 1993, Chartrand was named a screenwriter in residence at the Canadian Film Centre. The half-hour film she worked on during this residency, "In Limbo", was in post-production when she died.

Chartrand's collected poetry was published posthumously in the 1998 book, We Make the Air: the Poetry of Lina Chartrand.

== Death and legacy ==
Chartrand died on April 2, 1994, due to complications with liver disease, pre-deceasing partner Kye Marshall. The Lina Chartrand Poetry Award was established in her memory.
