= Bruce Carlson (composer) =

Canadian composer from Manitoba

- Born: 1944 (age 80–81); Toronto, Ontario, Canada
- Origin: Manitoba, Canada
- Genres: Classical
- Education: University of Waterloo (BA)

Bruce Carlson (born 1944) is a Canadian composer from Manitoba.

== Early life and education ==
Carlson was born in Toronto. He earned a Bachelor of Arts degree from the University of Waterloo in 1967 and a teaching certificate from the University of Toronto. He also studied music at the University of Manitoba under Robert Turner.

== Career ==
Carlson, through the Manitoba Arts Council and other funding bodies, has received numerous commissions to write for groups such as the Festival Quartet of Canada, the Purcell String Quartet, the Manitoba Chamber Orchestra, the Winnipeg Singers, the Winnipeg Brass and numerous high school and university concert bands and choirs.

His symphony, Toledo (1992), premiered by the John Henderson Junior High Wind Ensemble under the direction of Jeff Kula, was the first work to be commissioned by a Manitoba high school band through the Manitoba Arts Council. It was chosen in 2002 to be the first Canadian work to be included in the publication Teaching music through performance in band. Toledo has been performed internationally including performances in the United States, Hong Kong, Germany and Singapore. In 2007, in the MBM Times magazine, Toledo was selected to be included on the noted American band conductor Frank Ticheli's list of high-quality band works.

== Personal life ==
Carlson and his wife, Carole, who have four children and three grandchildren. They live in Domain, Manitoba, Canada.

== Notable works ==
- Toledo (1992) – was commissioned by John Henderson Junior High Wind Ensemble through the Manitoba Arts Council
- Gloria - A Contemporary Chorale for Concert Band (2002) was commissioned by the Manitoba Band Association to commemorate its 25th anniversary
- Navy Hymn (2002) was commissioned by the HMCS Chippawa Naval Reserve Band to commemorate Chippawa's 80th anniversary
- Psalm 42 (2002) for choir (SATB) and optional flute was commissioned by the Royal Canadian College of Organists which was premiered in a concert at their national convention in 2004
- Adamas (2005) was premiered at the Winnipeg Concert Hall by the River East Collegiate Wind Ensemble under the direction of Jeff Kula in 2005 and performed again at the Optimist Festival in 2006
- Red River Valley(2005) was commissioned by the Rupertsland Brass Band and was performed by a mass band under the direction of Robert Redhead at the Prairie Brass Band Festival in Winnipeg, in 2006
- Jubilate Deo (2007) was performed, commissioned by Helen Litz and the Winnipeg Mennonite Children's Choir to celebrate the 50th anniversary of the choir under the direction of its founder, Helen Litz
