= Sky Gilbert =

Canadian writer, actor, academic, and drag performer

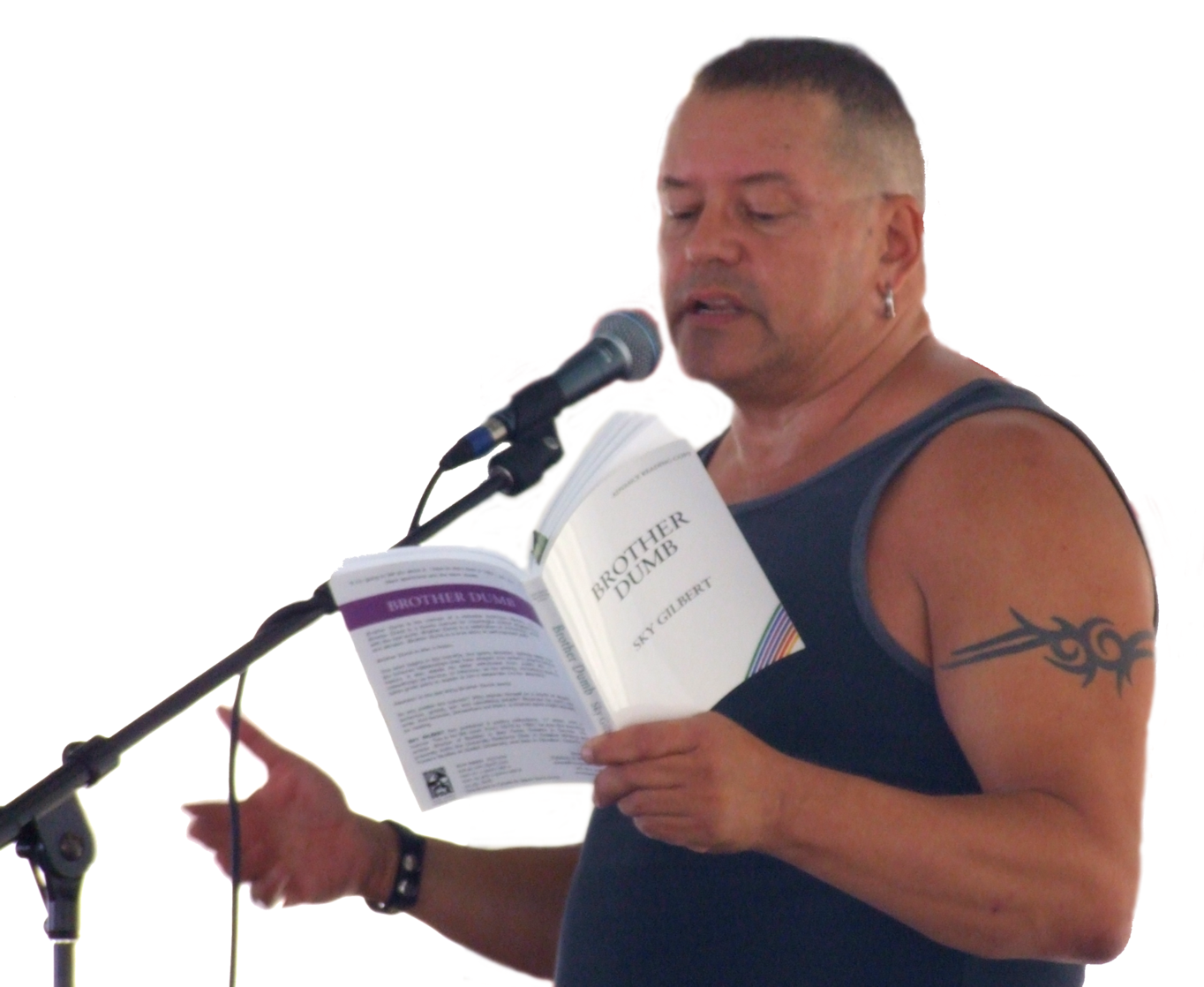
- Sky Gilbert reading from his 2006 novel
- Born: Schuyler Lee Gilbert Jr. December 20, 1952 (age 73); Norwich, Connecticut, U.S.
- Partner: Ian Jarvis

Schuyler Lee (Sky) Gilbert Jr. (born December 20, 1952) is a Canadian writer, actor, academic and drag performer. Born in Norwich, Connecticut, he studied theatre at York University in Toronto, Ontario, and at the University of Toronto, before becoming the co-founder and artistic director of Buddies in Bad Times, a Toronto theatre company dedicated to LGBT drama. His drag name is Jane. Gilbert is a professor emeritus at the University of Guelph.

Although primarily a playwright, Gilbert has also published novels, poetry and an autobiography. His works deal with issues of gender and sexuality. His novel An English Gentleman won a ReLit Award in 2005. Many of Gilbert's works are produced at Buddies in Bad Times Theatre. He was also a regular columnist for Toronto's Eye Weekly.

Gilbert is the former University Chair in Creative Writing and Theatre Studies at the University of Guelph. He received his Ph.D. at the University of Toronto.

Gilbert is artistic director of The Hammertheatre Company, founded in January 2007, a company devoted to theatre research in Hamilton, Ontario. The theatre is at the old Ancient Order of Foresters building in the James Street North neighbourhood, a center of Hamilton's art scene. In 2000, Pride Toronto named Gilbert and Michelle Douglas as grand marshals for its parade that year.

Gilbert has been living in Hamilton since 2004 with his partner, artist Ian Jarvis.

== Works ==
=== Plays ===
- Art Rat (1980)
- Lana Turner Has Collapsed! (1980)
- Cavafy (1981)
- Murder/Lover (1982)
- Pasolini/Pelosi (1983)
- Peace Banquet: Ancient Greece Meets the Atomic Age - co-written with Micah Barnes, Cynthia Grant, Dean Gilmour, Charis Polatos, Kim Renders, Judith Rudakoff, Philip Shepherd and Maureen White (1983)
- The Dressing Gown: a Faery Tale for Adults Only (Playwrights Canada Press, 1984, ISBN 0-88754-442-8)
- The Postman Rings Once: a Comedy (Playwrights Canada Press, 1985)
- Theatrelife: a Modern Melodrama (Playwrights Canada Press, 1987)
- The Whore's Revenge : a Victorian Melodrama (Playwrights Union of Canada, 1989, ISBN 1-55155-594-8)
- Drag Queens in Outer Space: a Dreamplay (Playwrights Canada Press, 1990; Second Scene Editions, 2006, ISBN 0-88754-707-9)
- Ban This Show: a Play in the Form of a Dare (Playwrights Union of Canada, 1990, ISBN 1-55155-040-7)
- Suzie Goo: Private Secretary (1991; Second Scene Editions, 2006, ISBN 0-88754-709-5)
- In Which Pier Paolo Pasolini Sees His Own Death in the Face of a Boy (1991)
- My Night With Tennessee (1992)
- An Investigation into the Strange Case of the Wildboy: a Dream in the Form of a Document (Playwrights Union of Canada, 1992, ISBN 1-55155-270-1)
- Play Murder (Blizzard Publishing, 1993, ISBN 0-921368-49-6)
- Drag Queens on Trial: a Courtroom Melodrama (Playwrights Union of Canada, 1994)
- Hester: An Introduction (1994)
- More Divine (1994)
- Jim Dandy (1995)
- Crater (Playwrights Union of Canada, 1997, ISBN 1-55173-463-X)
- Ten Ruminations on an Elegy Attributed to William Shakespeare (Playwrights Union of Canada, 1997, ISBN 1-55173-456-6)
- Schubert Lied (1998)
- Independence (1998)
- The Emotionalists (Blizzard Publishing, 2000, ISBN 1-55331-001-2)
- Heliogabalus: A Love Story (Cabaret Theatre Company, 2002)
- Rope Enough (Buddies in Bad Times, 2005; Playwrights Canada Press, ISBN 0-88754-872-5, 2007)
- Bad Acting Teachers (Buddies in Bad Times, 2006)
- Will The Real J.T. LeRoy Please Stand up? (Buddies in Bad Times, 2007)
- I Have AIDS! (Buddies in Bad Times, 2009)
- The Situationists (Buddies in Bad Times, 2011)
- To Myself at 28 (SummerWorks Theatre Festival, 2013)
- A Few Brittle Leaves (Buddies in Bad Times, 2013)

==== Collections ====
- This Unknown Flesh: A Collection of Plays by Sky Gilbert (Coach House Press, 1995, ISBN 0-88910-479-4)
- Painted, Tainted, Sainted: Four Plays (Playwrights Canada Press, 1996, ISBN 0-88754-550-5)
- Avoidance Tactics (Broken Jaw Press, 2001, ISBN 1-896647-50-2)
- Perfectly Abnormal: Seven Gay Plays (editor) (Playwrights Canada Press, 2006, ISBN 0-88754-852-0)

=== Novels ===
- Guilty (Insomniac Press, 1998, ISBN 1-895837-29-4)
- St. Stephen's (Insomniac Press, 1999, ISBN 1-895837-70-7)
- I am Kasper Klotz (ECW Press, 2001, ISBN 1-55022-477-8)
- An English Gentleman (Cormorant Books, 2004, ISBN 1-896951-55-4)
- Brother Dumb (ECW Press, 2006, ISBN 978-1-55022-768-0)

=== Poetry ===
- Digressions of a Naked Party Girl (ECW Press, 1998, ISBN 1-55022-364-X)
- Temptations for a Juvenile Delinquent (ECW Press, 2003, ISBN 1-55022-612-6)
- A Nice Place To Visit (ECW Press, 2009, ISBN 978-1-55022-893-9)

=== Nonfiction ===
- Ejaculations from the Charm Factory: a Memoir (ECW Press, 2000, ISBN 1-55022-432-8)
- Shakespeare Beyond Science: When Poetry Was the World (Guernica Editions, 2020, ISBN 978-1-77183-503-9)

=== Films ===
- Listen to the City (1984)
- Film (1992)
- Kanada (1993)
- My Addiction (1994)
- Bubbles Galore (1996)
- My Summer Vacation (1996)
- The Blue Hermaphrodite (1996)
- No Contest II (1997)
- Too Much Sex (2000)
