= Minotaur (novel) =

1981 novel by Benjamin Tammuz

Minotaur is a novel by Benjamin Tammuz first published in English translation in 1981. The translation was made by Kim Parfitt and Mildred Budny. The novel is a story of love, and obsession with tragic consequences. Graham Greene declared that it was the "novel of the year" following its publication.

The novel was made into a film of the same name in 1997 by director Jonathan Tammuz, the son of Benjamin Tammuz.
