= Diana Thorneycroft =

- Born: 1956 (age 69–70); Claresholm, Alberta, Canada
- Education: BFA, University of Manitoba, MA, University of Wisconsin
- Known for: Photographer, sculptor, installation artist, educator
- Website: dianathorneycroft.com

Diana Thorneycroft (born 1956) is a Canadian artist based in Winnipeg, Manitoba, whose work has exhibited nationally and internationally. She works primarily in photography, drawing, and sculpture/installation and makes photographs of staged dioramas to explore sexuality and national identity, and even, national icons such as the Group of Seven. Her work blurs the lines between gendered bodies by employing phalluses. She is also an educator: she worked as a sessional instructor at the University of Manitoba's School of Art for 25 years.

== Education ==
Diana Thorneycroft graduated with an MFA from the University of Wisconsin in 1980 and with a Bachelor of Fine Arts (Honours) from the University of Manitoba in 1979. Her early influences include Georgia O'Keeffe, Louise Bourgeois, Hieronymus Bosch and Pieter Brueghel the Elder. Her art practice shifted in the mid-1980s, when a friend showed her a book called Joel-Peter Witkin: Forty Photographs, which led her to start using a camera.

== Exhibitions ==
Thorneycroft has exhibited her work across Canada, the United States and Europe, as well as in Moscow, Tokyo and Sydney. In 2022, she showed the mixed media installation Herd, which involved a 40-foot ramp and over 150 toy horses, half of which had been altered. She presented images from past and current work, and focused on her use of surrogates to address the human condition in an artist's talk about the show.

== Selected artworks ==
=== Canadians and Americans (best friends ~~forever~~ … it's complicated) ===
A series of digital photographs, Canadians and Americans (best friends ~~forever~~ … it's complicated) looks at iconic moments and figures in American and Canadian history to explore the unbalanced relationship and power dynamic between the two neighbouring countries. The collection was exhibited at the Michael Gibson Gallery in London, Ontario in October 2013.

=== A People's History ===
Looking at the horrific history of crimes and atrocities perpetrated against vulnerable people in Canada, A People's History is a series of photographs based on dioramas created by the artist.

=== Group of Seven Awkward Moments ===
Group of Seven Awkward Moments is a photographic series created between 2007 and 2010 which employs black humour to look at the effect of the mythology of the Canadian landscape on the construct of Canadian identity. The series features dioramas of histories that are part of iconic Canadian symbolism paired with backgrounds of reproductions of paintings by The Group of Seven.

=== There Must Be 50 Ways to Kill Your Lover ===
This series of drawings explores violence in the media through the behaviour of popular cartoon characters.

=== The Canadiana Martyrdom Series ===
The photographs is this series uses paraphernalia depicting Canadian tourism, identity, and culture to discuss spectacles of martyrdom and apathy to human suffering.

== Selected public collections ==
Among the international and national public collections which hold her work are the following:

- Agnes Etherington Art Centre, Kingston, Ontario
- McMichael Canadian Art Collection, Kleinburg, Ontario
- National Gallery of Canada, Ottawa, Ontario
- Nickle Galleries, Calgary, Alberta
- Winnipeg Art Gallery, Winnipeg, Manitoba

== Awards ==
In 2001, she received a Fleck Fellowship from the Banff Centre for the Arts. In 2012, Thorneycroft was awarded a Manitoba Arts Council Major Arts Grant and an Individual Artist Grant from the Winnipeg Arts Council. In 2016, Thorneycroft was the recipient of the Manitoba Arts Award of Distinction by the Manitoba Arts Council. As a recipient, Thorneycroft received $30,000 and the council's highest distinction for outstanding Manitoba artists with "long-term achievements".
