= Benjamin Tammuz =

- בנימין תמוז
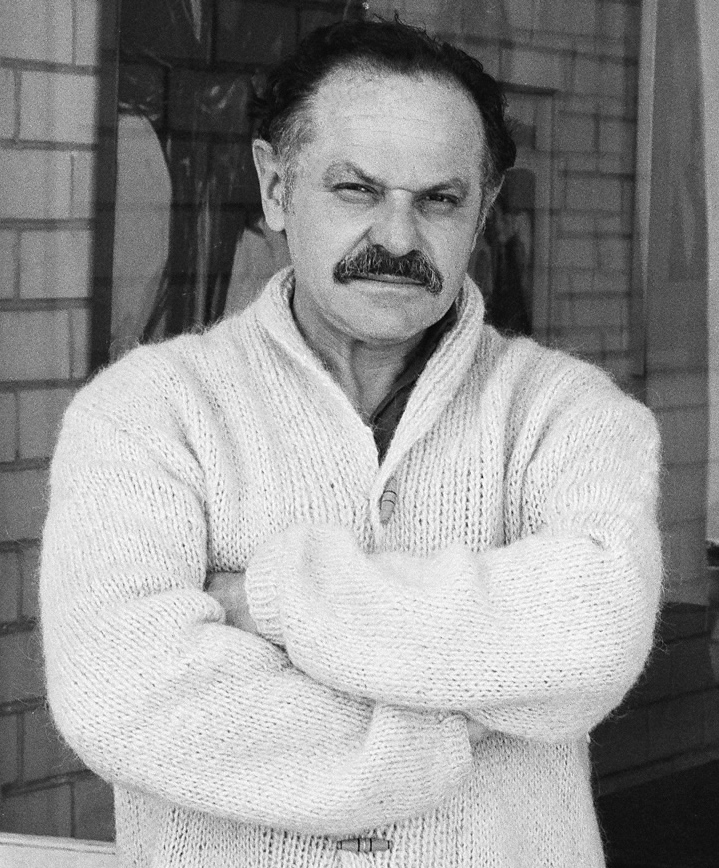
- Tel Aviv 1975
- Born: 11 July 1919; Soviet Russia
- Died: 19 July 1989 (aged 70); Tel Aviv, Israel

Benjamin Tammuz (Hebrew: בנימין תמוז; 11 July 1919 – 19 July 1989) was an Israeli writer and artist who contributed to Israeli culture in many disciplines, as a novelist, journalist, critic, painter, and sculptor.

Benjamin Tammuz was born in Soviet Russia. When he was five years old, he emigrated with his parents to Palestine, where he subsequently attended the Tachkemoni school and the Herzliya Hebrew High School in Tel Aviv. From an early age, he engaged in writing, sculpture, and painting. He also took an avid interest in art history, going on to study that subject at the Sorbonne in Paris. While growing up, he became a member of the Communist underground. As a youth he was a member of the Canaanite movement. More than his teachers and friends, the artist Yitzhak Danziger was an influence on him.

In 1948, Tammuz joined the editorial board of Haaretz. At first he wrote the popular column "Uzi & Co." Later he edited the children's newspaper Haaretz Shelanu. From 1965, he edited Haaretz's literary and cultural supplement, serving as the art critic there. From 1971 to 1975, he served as cultural attaché at the Israeli embassy in London. From 1979 to 1984, he was invited as a writer-in-residence at Oxford University. Benjamin Tammuz died in 1989 in Tel Aviv.

Tammuz has two sons. The elder son is Onn Tammuz, an architect and a fine art restorer and the younger son is Jonathan Tammuz, a film director whose films have included a 1997 adaptation of his father's novel Minotaur.

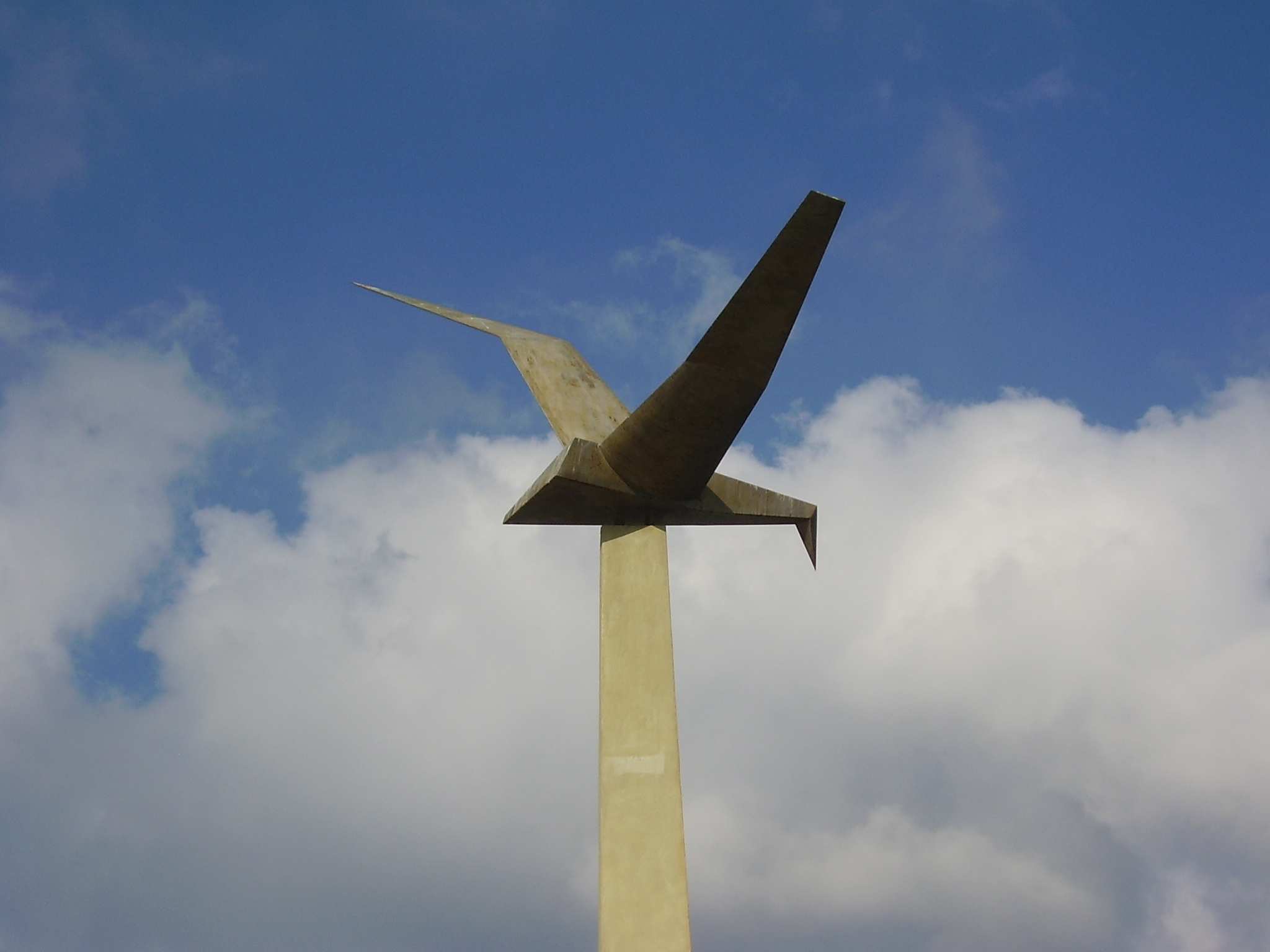
A war memorial in Tel Aviv's Independence Park sculpted by Tammuz

== Books published in English ==
- A Castle in Spain (1973), translation of Be-Sof Ma'arav (1966)
- A Rare Cure (stories, 1981), translation of Angioxyl, Terufah Nedirah (1973)
- Minotaur (1981), translation of the Hebrew-language novel of the same title (1980)
- Requiem for Na'aman (1982), translation of Requiem Le-Na'aman (1978)
- The Orchard (novella, 1984), translation of Ha-Pardes (1972)
