= Contemporary Verse 2 =

Canadian magazine

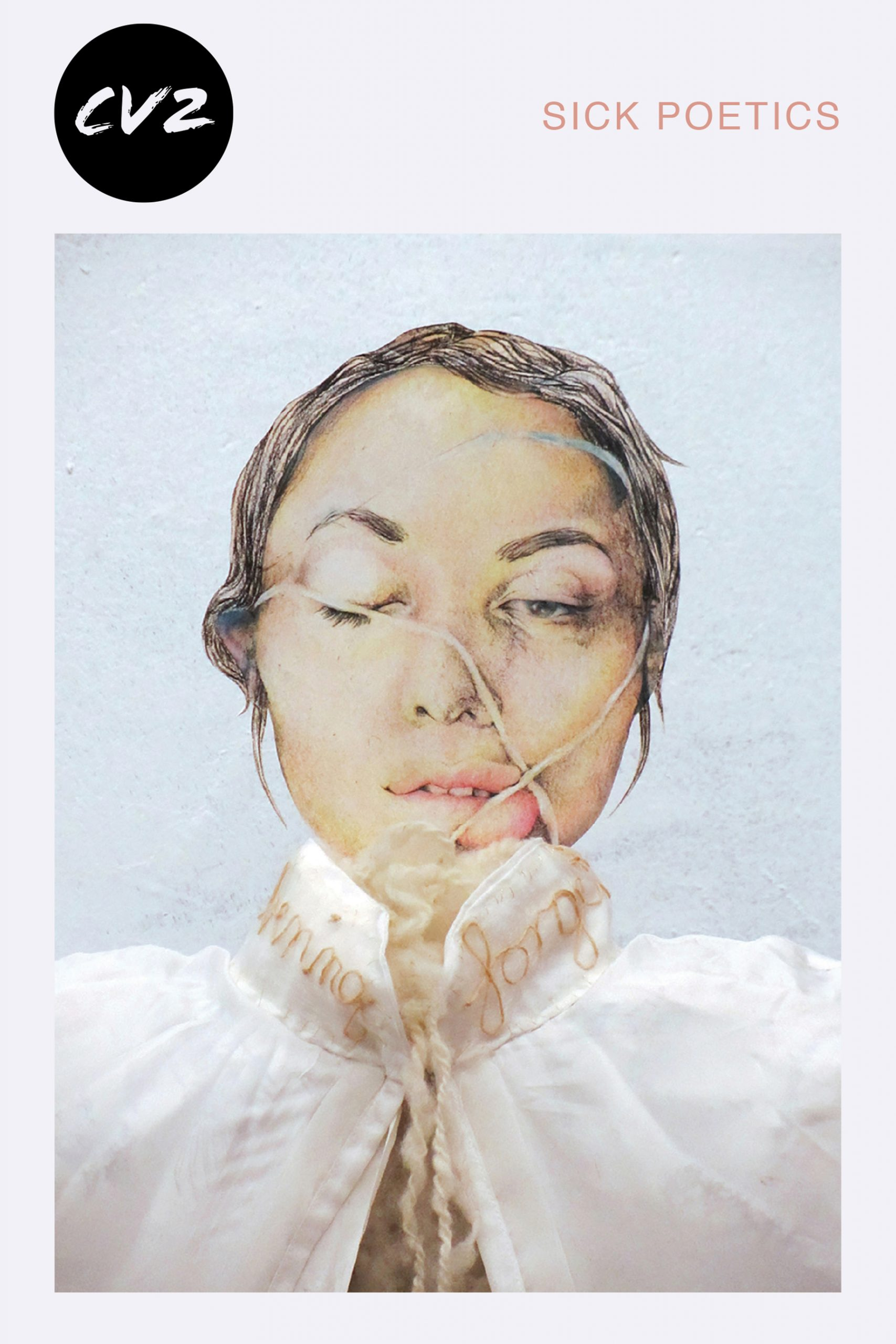
- "Sick Poetics" Contemporary Verse 2, Issue 44.4
- Categories: Poetry
- Frequency: Quarterly
- Founder: Dorothy Livesay
- First issue: 1975; 51 years ago
- Country: Canada
- Based in: Winnipeg
- Language: English
- Website: contemporaryverse2.ca
- ISSN: 0831-9502

Contemporary Verse 2 (CV2) is a Canadian magazine which focuses on the art of poetry as well as contemporary poets and the issues. CV2 also publishes essays, interviews, articles and reviews regarding various poetic works. The magazine tries to stimulate discussion, encourages people to try out their writing skills in various contests and to enjoy poetry. Although the magazine is in English, CV2 also accepts French poetry. Published quarterly, Contemporary Verse 2 aims to: "Advance the understanding and appreciation of contemporary poetry through the publication of Contemporary Verse 2: The Canadian Journal of Poetry and Critical Writing and related activities." (CV2)

== History ==
Founded by Dorothy Livesay in 1975, CVII, as it was then called, continued where another poetry magazine (Contemporary Verse) had left off in the early 1950s. Livesay, who was also the editor at the time, found that there were not enough magazines that discussed Canadian poetry and for this reason designed the new CVII magazine to continue the discussion on modern poets and poetry. Later, the Roman numeral would be replaced by a 2 and the magazine would include an even wider range of discussion material. However, to this day the Contemporary Verse 2 magazine still discusses Canadian poetry.

== Contests ==
The magazine CV2 is dedicated to broadening the poetic community and publishing new poets. CV2 contests aim to get the readers of the magazine involved in the poetic community by submitting original work. The cost of an entry fee depends on the contest and may also include a one-year subscription to the magazine.

The 2-Day Contest challenges poets to write one poem in a time frame of two days that contains ten words chosen by the CV2 staff. First, second and third prizes are awarded as well as two honourable mentions.

The Foster Poetry Prize (Formerly known as the Young Buck Poetry Prize) is a writing contest for emerging poets of any age who have not previously published a full-length book of poetry.

The Lina Chartrand Award was administered by CV2 from 1994-2019. The award was developed by Chartrand's family and friends after her death from complications of liver disease. The award was made to honour Lina and her commitment to working on behalf of others. The award recognized an emerging female poet who was published in CV2 the previous year.

== Supporters ==
- Manitoba Arts Council
- The Canada Council
- Small Arts and Literary Magazines Program offered through the Canadian Magazines Fund

by the Department of Canadian Heritage

- The Winnipeg Foundation and the Winnipeg Arts Council
- Government of Canada through the Publications Assistance Program and the Canadian

Magazines Fund toward their mailing and project costs.

Manitoba Magazine Publishers' Association through group magazine activities in the Province of Manitoba.
