= Connie Kaldor =

Canadian folk singer-songwriter

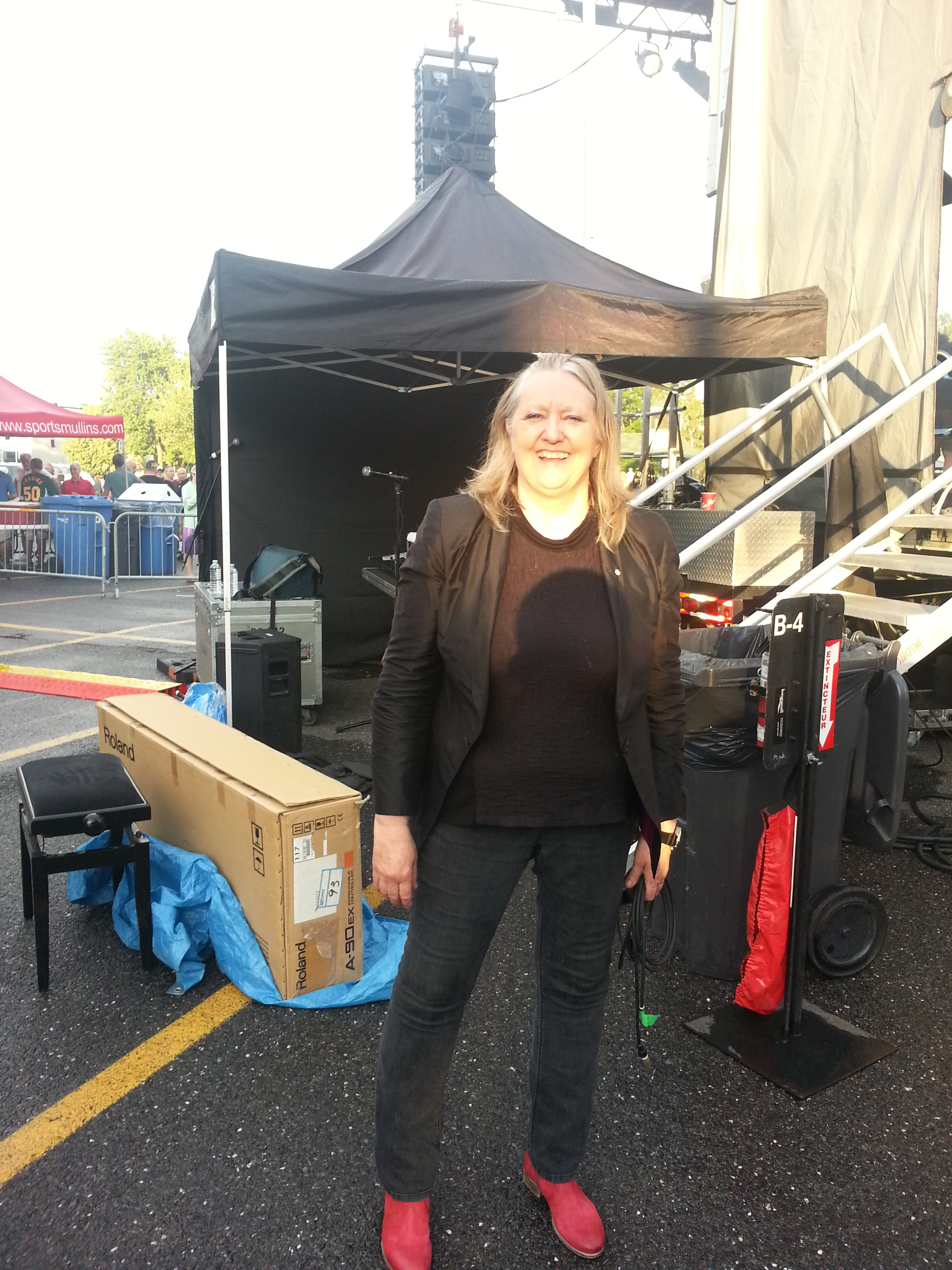

Background information
- Born: 9 May 1953 (age 73); Regina, Saskatchewan, Canada
- Occupation: Singer-songwriter
- Website: www.conniekaldor.com

Connie Isabelle Kaldor, CM (born 9 May 1953) is a Canadian folk singer-songwriter. She is the recipient of three Juno awards.

== Early life and education ==
Kaldor was born in Regina, Saskatchewan. She graduated from Campbell Collegiate in Regina in 1972 and the University of Alberta in 1976 with a BFA degree in theatre.

== Career ==
Kaldor performed with various theatre groups, including Theatre Passe Muraille, The Mummers and 25th Street House Theatre, until 1979, when she gave it up to start a full-time music career. In 1981, she founded her own independent record label, Coyote Entertainment, and has released eighteen albums.

Part of the Canadian Wave, Connie has performed alongside talents such as Stan Rogers, Ferron, and Valdy, and contributed to a newly emerging and distinctly Canadian sound. In the early 1980s, Kaldor opened for Stan Rogers in a tour across the United States and the two musicians played the Canadian Workshop together at the Kerrville Folk Festival in Texas in June 1983, after which Stan Rogers died in a plane crash returning home from the festival.

In 1997, she was featured performer in Moose Jaw, Saskatchewan on the last broadcast of Peter Gzowski's CBC national radio program Morningside. She was also among the first performers to play the Edmonton Folk Festival in 1980 where, alongside Sylvia Tyson and Stan Rogers, the trio was called the "nucleus of the first Edmonton Folk Music Festival.” That same year, she was selected by the co-founders of the Winnipeg Folk Festival, Mitch Podolak and Ava Kobrinsky, to be part of The Travelling Goodtime Medicine Show, with Sylvia Tyson, Stan Rogers, and Jim Post.

In 1985 she received a Most Promising Female Vocalist Juno Award nomination (now called the Juno Award for Breakthrough Artist of the Year) for her album Moonlight Grocery and in the year 2000, her album Love is a Truck was nominated for a Juno in the Folk Roots category. She has won the Juno Award for best children's album three times, in 1989, 2004, and 2005.

In 2000, She co-wrote the theme song for the animated television series based on the comic strip For Better or For Worse.

Her song "Wanderlust" was covered by Cosy Sheridan.

In 2003, her television show @ Wood River Hall debuted on VisionTV.

In 2005, she was invited to perform at the Saskatchewan Centennial for Joni Mitchell as well as the Queen of England. In 2006, she was made a Member of the Order of Canada. In 2009, she received an Honorary Doctorate of Fine Arts from the University of Regina. She also received an Alumni Association Honour Award from the University of Alberta. In 2014, she became the first songwriter to receive a Western Literature Association Distinguished Achievement Award. In 2020, her song, Seed in the Ground, was selected as one of 20 songs for the Canadian Music Class Challenge in honour of the Juno Awards 50th anniversary.

Kaldor and her husband, music producer and Hart-Rouge member Paul Campagne, have two sons and live in Montreal. She now performs with her husband and two adult children, Aleksi Campagne and Gabriel Campagne. She jokes that, "Shari Ulrich and I, I think we’re the only two people in the Canadian music scene that actually gave birth to their backup bands.”

According to the Garnette Report, Kaldor is "considered one of Canada's finest writers."

== Activism ==
Connie Kaldor is recognized as a feminist performer alongside artists like k.d. lang, Ferron, Buffy Sainte-Marie and Pauline Julien. From the very start of her career, Kaldor's lyrics have showcased the perspectives and experiences of women, "often using humour to disarm her audience." One of her earliest successes, the song Jerks called out cat-calling jerks in its lyrics, singing, "there are jerks in cars/jerks in trucks/some want to bug you/some want to f…f… find out what you’re really like… jerks!" According to Gary Cristall, who helped book the Vancouver Folk Music Festival in the 1980s, "The squeals of delight from the audience give a sense of the impact [of its lyrics]."

Kaldor began her career in the 1980s, a time when it was difficult to be booked as a female artist in Canada at festivals and venues. According to a recent interview with Kaldor herself, at the beginning, festival directors would tell her, “Sorry, we already have our women's act this year.” Nonetheless, Kaldor persevered and became a feature at folk festivals, thanks in part to the women in her audience who often "lobbied to have her included on folk festival rosters." She was hired at the Vancouver Folk Music Festival, which for the first time was highlighting a genre then called women's music (devoting space in the program to answer the question, ‘what is women’s music?').

As her career progressed, Kaldor continued to write songs from a feminist perspective. Her song 'Strength, Love and Laughter' is recognized as "an important song in Canadian feminist music” by The Canadian Encyclopedia. In 1988, Kaldor wrote the lyrics for Svetlana Zylin's musical The Destruction of Eve, a feminist interpretation of the Bible. The musical premiered in 1998 in Toronto with Company of Sirens.

Kaldor has been particularly vocal about the issues of domestic abuse and gender based violence. In 1988, the National Film Board produced a short film for her song “Get Back the Night” as a “statement against senseless violence.” In 1997, the Canadian Congress for Learning Opportunities for Women selected her song, “One Hit” to create pedagogical materials for Canadian classrooms addressing the topic of domestic violence against women. In 2019, Kaldor wrote Missing and Gone, "which addresses the issue of murdered and missing Indigenous women and children". Most recently, Kaldor wrote the song, "Woman Who Pays," which responds to the series of 8 femicides in 8 weeks in Montreal in 2021 which resulted in the death of a friend of her daughter-in-law. In 2021, 2022, 2023, 2024, and 2025 Kaldor hosted virtual international Women's Day Concerts on March 8 to raise money for Chez Doris, a Women's shelter in Montreal.

== Honours and awards ==
- Nominated for Most Promising Female Vocalist at the 1984 Juno Awards for her album Moonlight Grocery.
- Won a Juno Award for Best Children’s Album for her album Lullaby Berceuse in 1989.
- Won a 1990 U.S. Parents' Choice Award for Lullaby Berceuse.
- Nominated for a Dora Mavor Moore Awards in Independent Theatre for Outstanding Sound or Music alongside David Sereda for the Company of Sirens production of The Destruction of Eve by Svetlana Zylin in 1998.
- Nominated for a Juno in the Folk Roots category for her album Love is a Truck in 2000.
- Recipient of the Queen’s Golden Jubilee Medal in 2002.
- Nominated for a Gemini Award for "Best Performance or Host in a Variety Program or Series" for her Wood River Hall TV Series (VisionTV) at the 19th Gemini Awards in 2004.
- Won a Juno Award for Best Children’s Album for A Duck in New York City in 2004.
- Won a Juno Award for Best Children’s Album for A Poodle in Paris in 2005
- Made a Member of the Order of Canada (Awarded on: October 5, 2006; Invested on: October 26, 2007).
- Hosted the very 1st Canadian Folk Music Awards.
- Nominated for a Canadian Folk Music Award for her album Sky with Nothing to Get in the Way for both 'Best Songwriter - English" and "Best Singer - Contemporary" in 2005 at the 1st Canadian Folk Music Awards.
- Hosted the 2nd Canadian Folk Music Awards.
- Nominated for a Canadian Folk Music Award for her children's album Poodle in Paris at the 2nd Canadian Folk Music Awards.
- Nominated for a Canadian Folk Music Award alongside Geneviève Bilodeau for the French translation of her children's album Un Canard à New York at the 3rd Canadian Folk Music Awards.
- Received an Honorary Doctorate of Fine Arts from the University of Regina in 2009.
- Received an Alumni Association Honour Award from the University of Alberta.
- Won a Western Literature Association Distinguished Achievement Award in 2014 (the first songwriter to receive this distinction).
- Received a Lifetime Achievement Award from the Woodstock Folk Festival in August 2024.
- Nominated for "Best Original Score" at the 7th Indie Series Awards for her work on the web-series Nikola Tesla and the End of the World.
- Nominated for Solo Artist of the Year at the Canadian Folk Music Awards for her album Keep Going (April 2025).
- Nominated for Song of the Year at the International Folk Music Awards (February 2025).

== Discography ==
- One Of These Days (1981)
- Moonlight Grocery (1984)
- New Songs for an Old Celebration (1986) (with Roy Forbes)
- Lullaby Berceuse (1988) (with Carmen Campagne)
- Gentle of Heart (1989)
- Wood River (1992)
- Out of the Blue (1994)
- Small Café (1996)
- Love is a Truck (2000)
- A Duck in New York City (2003)
- A Poodle in Paris (2004)
- Sky With Nothing to Get in the Way (2005)
- Vinyl Songbook (2005)
- Postcards from the Road (2009)
- Love Sask (2014)
- Everyday Moments (2019)
- Prairie Christmas (2020)
- Keep Going (2023)
