= Manitoba Arts Council =

Council overview
- Formed: 1965
- Type: Crown corporation
- Headquarters: 525 – 93 Lombard Ave, Winnipeg, MB R3B 3B1
- Annual budget: $12.7 m CAD (2023)
- Council executives: Katarina Kupca, Chair; Randy Joynt, Executive Director
- Parent department: Manitoba Sport, Culture, Heritage and Tourism
- Key document: The Arts Council Act
- Website: artscouncil.mb.ca/

The Manitoba Arts Council (MAC) is a provincial crown corporation whose purpose is to promote the arts. The Council awards grants to professional artists and arts organizations in Manitoba in all art forms; it also provides related creative activity such as arts education.

The Council was founded in 1965 with the passage of An Act to Establish The Manitoba Arts Council and incorporated in 1967. (It now operates under the terms of The Arts Council Act.) Remaining at arm’s-length from the Government of Manitoba, it is funded by the Manitoba Sport, Culture and Heritage and reports annually to the Provincial Legislature through the Minister of Sport, Culture and Heritage in its annual report.

== Governance ==
Today, the Council operates under the terms of The Arts Council Act, which was amended in 2017. Remaining at arm’s-length from the Government of Manitoba, it is funded by the Manitoba Sport, Culture and Heritage and reports annually to the Provincial Legislature through the Minister of Sport, Culture and Heritage in its annual report.

The Manitoba Arts Council consists of 9 board members who are appointed for a term by the Lieutenant-Governor-in-Council. The Executive Director is hired by the Council to carry out its policies and oversee operations.

== Manitoba Arts Award of Distinction ==
The Manitoba Arts Award of Distinction is a CA$30,000 prize awarded annually to an artist or arts professional for "artistic excellence and contribution to the development of the arts in Manitoba."

Recipients are selected by a multidisciplinary panel from nominations submitted by the community. The award process is administered and funded by the Council.

Year	Name	Field
2002	Leslee Silverman	theatre
2003	Robert Kroetsch	literary arts
2004	Grant Guy	performance and media arts
2005	Guy Maddin	film
2006	Aganetha Dyck	visual arts
2007	Robert Turner	music
2008	Roland Mahé	theatre
2009	William Eakin (artist)	visual arts
2012	J. Roger Léveillé	literary arts
2014	Robert Archambeau	visual arts
2016	Diana Thorneycroft	visual arts
2018	Shawna Dempsey and Lorri Millan	performance arts
2020	Alan Greyeyes	music
2022	Daina Warren	visual arts
2023	Di Brandt	literary arts
2024	Jennine Krauchi	beadwork
2025	Ken Gregory	media arts

== Prizes in the Arts ==
Four $10,000 Prizes in the Arts were awarded every two years, opposite of the Manitoba Arts Award of Distinction, recognizing artists or groups working in Manitoba in four categories:

- The Connecting Creative Communities Prize
- The Emerging Excellence Prize
- The Indigenous Full Circle Prize
- The Rural Recognition Prize

Recipients were selected by a multidisciplinary panel from nominations submitted by the community. The award process was administered and funded by the Council. The Prizes in the Arts were discontinued in 2022.

Year	Connecting Creative Communities	Emerging Excellence	Indigenous Full Circle	Rural Recognition
2019	Theatre Projects Manitoba	Helga Jakobson	Marie-Josée Dandeneau	Flin Flon Arts Council
2021	ArtsJunktion mb Inc.	melannie monoceros	Lana Sinclair	Donna Besel

== Operations and grants ==
In the 2019/20 fiscal year, the Council funded 525 arts organizations and artistic projects, which made for a total of CA$8.3 million.

The following is the number of MAC-funded projects by region, per 10,000 population:

- Northern Manitoba (NorMan), 4.5
- Parkland, 2.6
- Interlake, 3.2
- Westman, 2.6
- Central Plains, 2.9
- Pembina Valley, 2.8
- Eastman, 1.6
- Winnipeg, 3.0

The Council's "Indigenous 360" funding stream offers three granting programs that support professional Indigenous artists, arts/cultural professionals, Knowledge Keepers, art groups, and organizations from Manitoba. In the fall of 2018, the Council began collecting information on the background and identity of individual applicants—this includes Indigenous, visible minorities, females, non-binary, and Francophone applicants, as well as applicants who live with a disability or mental illness or who are deaf.

Organizations and activities funded by MAC in 2019/2020
Recipient	City/town	Awarded amount (CA$)
Aboriginal Music Manitoba Inc.	Winnipeg	$15,000
aceartinc.	Winnipeg	$89,180
Arbeiter Ring Publishing Ltd. (ARP Books)	Winnipeg	$24,500
Art City Inc.	Winnipeg	$15,000
Art Gallery of Southwestern Manitoba	Brandon	$185,000
Art Holm	Winnipeg	$6,000
Arts Manitoba Publications Inc (Border Crossings)	Winnipeg	$99,470
Arts West Council Inc.	Brandon	$3,000
ArtsJunktion	Winnipeg	$14,792
At Bay Press	Winnipeg	$15,000
Association of Manitoba Book Publishers	Winnipeg	$48,000
Bedside Press	Narol	$6,250
Brandon Chamber Players	Brandon	$20,580
Camerata Nova	Winnipeg	$15,000
Cancercare Manitoba Foundation Inc.	Winnipeg	$10,000
Canzona Inc.	Winnipeg	$12,500
Cluster: New Music + Integrated Arts Inc.	Winnipeg	$5,302
Company Link	Winnipeg	$11,000
Contemporary Verse 2	Winnipeg	$34,500
Eckhardt-Gramatte National Music Competition	Brandon	$9,000
Fernwood Publishing	Winnipeg	$4,055
Flin Flon Arts Council	Flin Flon	$7,500
Gallery 1C03 (University of Winnipeg)	Winnipeg	$8,700
Gimli Film Festival	Gimli	$20,000 + $5,000
Goldrock Press	Norway House	$7,500 + $7,500
Graffiti Art Programming Inc.	Winnipeg	$10,000
Great Plains Publications	Winnipeg	$32,500
GroundSwell, Inc.	Winnipeg	$45,080
Gwen Secter Creative Living Centre	Winnipeg	$15,000
Herizons Magazine	Winnipeg	$6,000
Home Routes/Chemin Chez Nous	Winnipeg	$10,000 + $7,500
Interlake Art Board	Winnipeg	$7,382
Jazz Winnipeg	Winnipeg	$10,000
J. Gordon Shillingford Publishing	Winnipeg	$36,700
La Maison des artistes visuels inc.	Winnipeg	$13,250
Les Éditions du Blé Saint-Boniface	Winnipeg	$26,250
Manito Ahbee Festival Inc.	Winnipeg	$15,000
Manitoba African Film Festival Inc.	Winnipeg	$15,000
Manitoba Arts Network	Winnipeg	$12,500
Manitoba Association of Playwrights Inc.	Winnipeg	$53,900
Manitoba Band Association	Winnipeg	$6,000
Manitoba Chamber Orchestra Inc.	Winnipeg	$8,000 + $20,000 + $112,000
Manitoba Choral Association	Winnipeg	$1,500
Manitoba Opera	Winnipeg	$220,000 + $150,000*
Manitoba Printmakers Association Inc. / Martha Street Studio	Winnipeg	$55,000
Manitoba Theatre for Young People	Winnipeg	$56,250 + $245,000
Manitoba Underground Opera	Winnipeg	$15,000 + $15,000
Mentoring Artists for Women's Art (MAWA)	Winnipeg	$73,000
Misericordia Health Centre	Winnipeg	$10,200
NAfro Dance Productions	Winnipeg	$25,000
Northern Juried Art Show 2019	Thompson	$12,125
NorVA Centre	Flin Flon	$7,572
One Trunk Theatre	Winnipeg	$20,000
PLATFORM centre for Photographic Digital Arts	Winnipeg	$58,000
Plug-In Inc. (Plug In Institute of Contemporary Arts)	Winnipeg	$166,600
Polycoro Inc.	Winnipeg	$15,000
Prairie Comics Festival	Winnipeg	$8,840
Prairie Debut Inc.	Portage la Prairie	$5,000
Prairie Fire Press Inc.	Winnipeg	$73,720
Prairie Theatre Exchange Inc.	Winnipeg	$33,750 + $355,000
Q DANCE	Winnipeg	$15,000
Rainbow Stage	Winnipeg	$15,000
Rosamunde Summer Music Academy	Winnipeg	$3,000
Royal Manitoba Theatre Centre Inc.	Winnipeg	$37,500 + $686,000 + $150,000*
Royal Winnipeg Ballet School	Winnipeg	$744,800
Royal Winnipeg Ballet School Professional Division	Winnipeg	$10,000 + $130,000
Sarasvati Dramatic Theatre Productions and Repertory Inc	Winnipeg	$15,000 + $15,000
Sawdon Dance	Winnipeg	$14,600
School of Contemporary Dancers Inc.	Winnipeg	$32,500
Shakespeare in the Ruins	Winnipeg	$9,000 + $56,050
Sick + Twisted Theatre	Winnipeg	$10,000
Signature Editions	Winnipeg	$35,000
SOUNDYARD	Winnipeg	$5,880
Spence Neighbourhood Association Inc.	Winnipeg	$15,000
Theatre by the River Inc.	Winnipeg	$7,000
Théâtre Cercle Molière Winnipeg	Winnipeg	$175,000
Theatre Projects Manitoba	Winnipeg	$40,000 + $51,500
Turnstone Press Ltd.	Winnipeg	$35,000
University of Manitoba Press	Winnipeg	$34,500
Urban Shaman Inc.	Winnipeg	$65,000
Video Pool Media Arts Centre	Winnipeg	$95,060
Window Winnipeg	Winnipeg	$7,850
Winnipeg Aboriginal Film and Video Festival	Winnipeg	$15,000
Winnipeg Chamber Music Society	Winnipeg	$17,000
Winnipeg Film Group	Winnipeg	$95,000
Winnipeg International Writers Festival	Winnipeg	$8,000
Winnipeg Jazz Orchestra	Winnipeg	$8,000 + $18,000
Winnipeg Jewish Theatre	Winnipeg	$35,000
The Winnipeg Singers	Winnipeg	$29,400
Winnipeg Symphony Orchestra	Winnipeg	$56,250 + $735,000 + $125,000*
Winnipeg's Contemporary Dancers $112,250	Winnipeg	
Young Lungs Dance Exchange	Winnipeg	$15,000
zone41 theatre, inc.	Winnipeg	$15,000

*Special operating grant disbursed on behalf of Manitoba Sports, Culture, and Heritage.
