= Lib Spry =

Canadian director, playwright, and academic

- Years active: 1986-pres.
- Known for: Co-founder of Company of Sirens
- Parents: Graham Spry (father); Irene Spry (mother)

Lib Spry is a Canadian director, playwright, and academic. She is a co-founder of Company of Sirens and Straight Stitching Productions and served as the artistic director of Passionate Balance.

== Career ==
In 1986, Spry co-founded the feminist theatre company, Company of Sirens, with Lina Chartrand, Aida Jordão, Catherine Glen, Shawna Dempsey, and Cynthia Grant. With Company of Sirens, Spry created the play, The Working People's Picture Show, which was first staged in 1987. With Shirley Barrie, Spry co-founded Straight Stitching Productions in 1989. Spry served as the artistic director of the Ottawa-based theatre company, Passionate Balance. In 1992, she co-developed, with Rob Thompson, the play Collateral Damages. The play used techniques of the Theatre of the Oppressed.

In 2012, Spry directed Where the Blood Mixes by Kevin Loring. In 2013, Spry was set to direct the mini-musical, Marg Szkaluba (Pissy's Wife), written by Ron Chambers, at the Rialto Theatre in Montreal; however, the show was indefinitely postponed when the show's star, Carolyn Fe, became ill.

Spry has taught at the University of Ottawa, Queen's University, and Concordia University. She currently teaches at McGill University.

== Personal life ==
Spry has an MFA in creative writing from Goddard College and a PhD in cultural studies from Queen's University. Her parents are Graham and Irene Spry and she had two brothers named Robin and Richard, and a nephew Jeremy.

== Plays ==
- Bungsu and the Big Snake
- Collateral Damages (co-written with Rob Thompson)
- Peace and Plenty (co-written with Peggy Sample)
- Playing Robin Hood
- A Princess Never Should
- Trance for Matron
- The Working People's Picture Show (co-created with Lina Chartrand, Aida Jordão, Catherine Glen, Shawna Dempsey, and Cynthia Grant)
