= Rupert's Land (film) =

- Directed by: Jonathan Tammuz
- Written by: Graeme Manson
- Produced by: Scott Kennedy; Bill Thumm
- Starring: Samuel West; Ian Tracey; George Wendt; Susan Hogan; Gabrielle Miller
- Cinematography: Gregory Middleton
- Edited by: Roger Mattiussi
- Music by: Phil Marshall
- Production company: Cadence Entertainment
- Distributed by: Red Sky Entertainment
- Release date: September 13, 1998 (TIFF)
- Running time: 93 minutes
- Country: Canada
- Language: English

Rupert's Land is a Canadian comedy film, directed by Jonathan Tammuz and released in 1998. The film stars Samuel West and Ian Tracey as Rupert and Dale McKay, estranged half-brothers on a road trip from Vancouver to Prince Rupert for their father's funeral. Rupert, who was raised primarily in England after his mother left their father to return home, has become a wealthy lawyer, while Dale, who remained in Canada, is a hard-nosed fisherman and small-time drug dealer, forcing the duo to overcome significant differences as they reconcile.

The cast also includes Susan Hogan as Dale's mother Trudy, Gabrielle Miller as his girlfriend Shelley, and George Wendt as Bloat, a former friend of Dale and Rupert's father who owns and operates a rural marijuana farm commune.

The film premiered at the 1998 Toronto International Film Festival.

== Critical response ==
The film received mixed reviews from critics. It was reviewed favourably by Glen Schaefer of The Province, who wrote that it was "a funny ride that will ring familiar with anyone who's ever had to be in Pouce Coupe or New Denver by dawn, with not quite enough time or money to get there." Marc Horton of the Edmonton Journal was more critical, writing that "Somehow, though, I never much believed in either their fights or their ultimate acceptance of one another. Perhaps it is because they are not all that easy to care about: Rupert loses a bit of twittiness and Dale softens, but it's too little too late. Still, there are the occasional moments of charm, and an ending that's marginally surprising, although painfully neat and tidy. In the end it's a sitcom, without the com.

Geoff Pevere of the Toronto Star was more mixed, calling it bumpy but fitfully engaging. He praised West, Tracey and Wendt for their performances, but concluded that "the shame is, the good parts tend to pass by like the moments of interest in an otherwise dull road trip: arresting at the time, but too few and fleeting to make the whole thing worthwhile."

== Awards and nominations ==
The film received five Genie Award nominations at the 19th Genie Awards in 1999, for Best Motion Picture, Best Director (Tammuz), Best Actor (West), Best Supporting Actor (Wendt) and Best Sound Editing (Jacqueline Cristianini, James Fonnyadt, Adam Gejdos, James Genn, Kirby Jinnah and Cam Wagner).

The film won six Leo Awards in 1999, for Best Feature Length Drama, Best Direction in a Feature Length Drama (Tammuz), Best Performance by a Male in a Feature Length Drama (Tracey), Best Cinematography in a Feature Length Drama (Gregory Middleton), Best Editing in a Feature Length Drama (Roger Matiussi) and Best Production Design in a Feature Length Drama (Brian Davie). It was also nominated, but did not win, for Best Lead Performance by a Female in a Feature Length Drama (2; Miller, Hogan), Best Screenwriting in a Feature Length Drama (Graeme Manson), and Best Overall Sound in a Feature Length Drama.
