= Aida Jordão =

Portuguese-Canadian creative and academic

- Born: Lisbon, Portugal
- Education: University of Toronto (PhD)
- Writing career
- Notable work: This is For You, Anna

Aida Jordão is a Portuguese-Canadian playwright, theatre director, and academic. She is a co-founder of the feminist theatre group, Company of Sirens, and she co-created This is For You, Anna, a germinal Canadian feminist theatre play.

== Early life and education ==
Jordão was born in Lisbon, Portugal. At age 9, she and her family moved to Toronto, Canada. She has a PhD from the Graduate Centre for Study of Drama at the University of Toronto. Her dissertation was titled, "Ines de Castro in Theatre and Film: A Feminist Exhumation of the Dead Queen."

== Career ==
Jordão is sometimes credited as a member of the Anna Collective, a group of women who co-created the play, This is For You, Anna, for Nightwood Theatre. As Jordão left the collective before the play's completion to work as an actor in Portugal, the play is most consistently credited to Suzanne Odette Khuri, Ann-Marie MacDonald, Baņuta Rubess, and Maureen White. In 1986, Jordão co-founded the feminist theatre group Company of Sirens with Lina Chartrand, Catherine Glen, Lib Spry, Shawna Dempsey, and Cynthia Grant. As part of Company of Sirens, Jordão co-created the group's most popular play, The Working People's Picture Show.

In 1991, her bilingual Portuguese/English play, Funeral in White, premiered with Company of Sirens. Twenty-two years later, it was published by Fidalgo Books. Mary The Slasher, a play Jordão co-wrote with Rebecca Burton, premiered at the second Hysteria Festival, co-presented by Nightwood Theatre and Buddies in Bad Times. At Nightwood Theatre's 22nd Groundswell Festival in August 2005, Jordão's play about a woman who had been a communist leader in the Spanish civil war, Las Pasionarias, premiered. In 2006, Jordäo worked on the puppet play Camoes, the One-Eyed Poet of Portugal about the Portuguese poet, Luís de Camões. The play was co-created with David Anderson, Nuno Cristo, Mark Keetch, and Larry Lewis.

Jordão works as a sessional lecturer in the Spanish and Portuguese departments of the University of Toronto and York University.

== Works ==
Plays:

- This is For You, Anna (co-created with the Anna Collective, first staged 1983)
- Funeral in White (first staged 1991, published 2013)
- Mary The Slasher (co-written with Rebecca Burton, first staged 2004)
- Las Pasionarias (first staged 2005)
- Camoes, the One-Eyed Poet of Portugal (co-created with David Anderson, Nuno Cristo, Mark Keetch and Larry Lewis, first staged 2006)
