= Svetlana Zylin =

Belgian-born Canadian theatre director and playwright (1948–2002)

- Born: 1948; Belgium
- Died: July 15, 2002 (aged 53–54); Winnipeg, Manitoba
- Education: University of Manitoba – BA; University of British Columbia – MFA
- Occupations: Director; Playwright

Svetlana Zylin (1948–2002) was a Belgian-born Canadian theatre director and playwright. She was also the founder of the Women's Theatre Collective in Vancouver, British Columbia.

== Biography ==
Zylin was born in Belgium in 1948. Her family immigrated to Winnipeg, Manitoba, Canada in 1954.

Zylin attended the University of Manitoba and graduated in 1968 with Bachelor of Arts degree. Zylin later received an MFA from the University of British Columbia's directing program. For her MFA thesis, Zylin originally directed Federico García Lorca's The House of Bernarda Alba, with an all female cast. (García Lorca's play, as he wrote it, has only female characters.) It was deemed ineligible as a thesis production, as her all female cast did not "reflect the human condition". Zylin then directed John Herbert's Fortune and Men's Eyes with an all-male cast which was deemed to meet the MFA requirements.

Zylin died in Winnipeg, Manitoba on July 15, 2002.

== Career ==
In 1972, Zylin founded the Women's Theatre Collective in Vancouver, British Columbia. From 1988 to 1991, Zylin ran the Playwright's Workshop in Montreal, Quebec.

Zylin created "Toronto's only continuing, improvised soap", A Wedge Of Night. A Wedge of Night ran in the late eighties at the Midtown Cafe Theatre Society (formerly the Ritz Cafe Theatre) in downtown Toronto and was a live, improvised soap opera. A Wedge of Night featured local actors such as Randy Parker, Sybille Forster, Bill Zaget, and Melanie Brown.

Zylin's play The Destruction of Eve premiered in 1998 with the Company of Sirens at the Annex Theatre in Toronto, Ontario. The Destruction of Eve is a feminist, musical take on the Bible and its female characters. The musical features music and lyrics by Connie Kaldor. The Company of Sirens premiere featured Ellen Rae Hennessy, Alex Fallis, Carol Greyeyes, Kathleen McAuliffe, Simrata Shakla and Shakura S'Aida.

In 1999, Zylin was appointed theatre and dance touring officer for the Manitoba Arts Council. The position was supposed to last for three years but was cut short due to Zylin's death. Zylin died in Winnipeg on July 15, 2002.

=== Select directorial credits ===
- Rites of Passage – Great Canadian Theatre Company, 1978–79 season
- One on the Way – Mulgrave Road Theatre, 1980
- Requiem for August by Helen Posno – 1982 Rhubarb! Festival
- Signs of Life by Joan Schenkar – Nightwood Theatre
- Djuna: What Of The Night – Company of Sirens, 1991
- Last Rites by Leslie Hamson – Nakai Theatre Ensemble, Festival of the Yukon Arts Centre 1992
- The Suicide by Nikolai Erdman – Dalhousie Theatre Department, 1993

== Plays ==
- The Destruction of Eve – written by Svetlana Zylin, music and lyrics by Connie Kaldor
- Djuna: What Of The Night – co-created by Zylin and Cynthia Grant
- One on the Way – co-created by Zylin, Mary Vingoe, Nicola Lipman, and Gay Hauser
