= Károly Várszegi =

Hungarian director and cinematographer

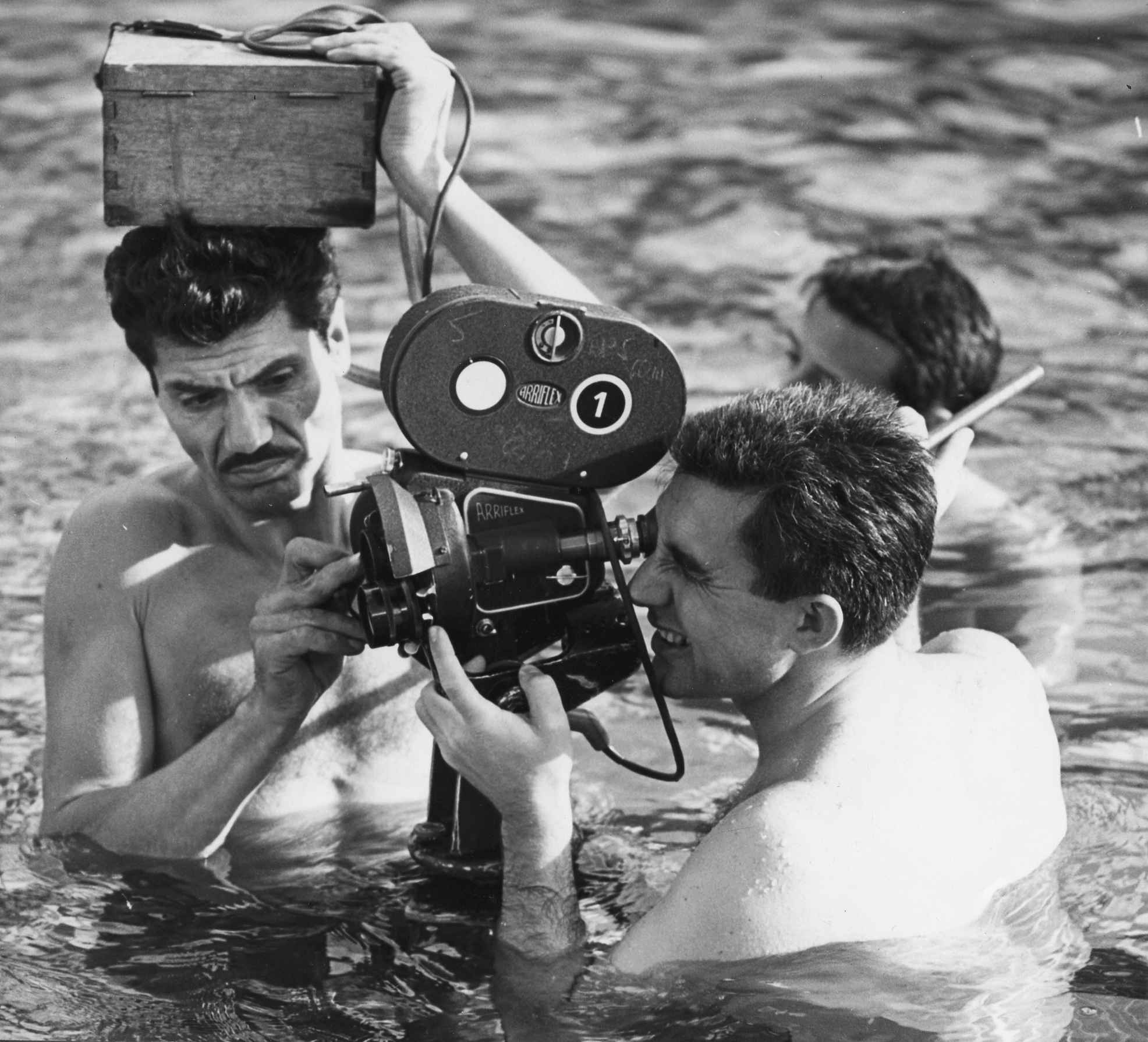
- Várszegi Károly and Kocsis Sándor, 1968
- Born: 25 January 1943; Budapest
- Died: 26 March 1999 (aged 56)
- Occupations: Director, cinematographer
- Awards: Balázs Béla Award (1990)

Károly Várszegi (25 January 1943 in Budapest, Hungary – 26 March 1999) was a Hungarian director and cinematographer, who was awarded with the Balázs Béla Award.

== Life ==
His father was Károly Várszegi and his mother was Mária Lowak. Between 1963 and 1967 he worked for the Magyar Televízió as a semi-cinematographer. In 1967 he got the chance to make his first own films as a cinematographer.

== Other awards ==
- First prize of the Festival of Miskolc (1976, 1977)

== Sources ==
- Hermann Péter: Magyar és Nemzetközi Ki Kicsoda 1998 CD-ROM, Biográf Kiadó, Budapest, 1997 ISBN 963-9051-195
