= Kim Renders =

Canadian actor

- Born: January 14, 1955; Toronto, Ontario
- Died: July 17, 2018 (aged 63); Kingston, Ontario
- Education: University of Ottawa
- Known for: Founding member of Nightwood Theatre

Kim Renders (January 14, 1955 – July 17, 2018) was a Canadian writer, director, actor and designer and a founding member of Nightwood Theatre, the oldest professional feminist theatre company in Canada.

== Early life ==
Renders was born in Toronto, Ontario, on January 14, 1955, to parents Jo and Yolande Renders. She had two younger siblings, Micky and Peter. Renders and her siblings were raised in Sarnia and Ottawa.

Renders graduated from University of Ottawa in 1977 with a B.A. in drama.

== Career ==
In 1979, Renders co-founded Nightwood Theatre with Cynthia Grant, Mary Vingoe, and Maureen White. While working with Nightwood, Renders acted in such productions as The True Story of Ida Johnson (1979), Glaze Tempera (1980), Flashbacks of Tomorrow (Memorias del Mañana) (1981), Mass/Age (1982), Smoke Damage: A story of the witch hunts (1983) and The Edge of the Earth is Too Near, Violette Leduc (1986 - as Violette). Renders was involved in the collective creation of many of the works she performed in. In 1987, Nightwood performed The Kingdom of LoudAsCanBe, a show for children written and directed by Renders. Of the four founding members of Nightwood, Renders was the only one to never hold the position of artistic director/artistic coordinator. Renders left Nightwood's board of directors in 1989.

In May 1980, Renders' play Soft Boiled premiered at the Rhubarb! Festival. She acted in the play alongside Maureen White. Soft Boiled #2, written and performed by White and Renders, premiered at the September 1980 Rhubarb! Festival. Soft Boiled #3 premiered in at the November 1982 Rhubarb! Festival and featured Renders, White, and Cheryl Cashman. The Soft Boiled shows were clown performances.

In the 1980s, Renders was a member of the Toronto-based theatre company, Autumn Angel. Other company members were Richard Rose, Thom Sokoloski, Maggie Huculak, Stewart Arnott, Tanja Jacobs, Bruce Vavrina and Mark Christmann.

She lived in Kingston, Ontario, where she was the artistic director of Theatre Kingston from 2007 to 2011. She was the artistic director of Chipped Off Performance Collective, a feminist/queer company that collaborates with local artists and community groups to create original performances that speak to the needs and concerns of marginalized Kingstonians.

She also managed the TYA troupe Barefoot Players, and was a faculty member of the Queen's University Dan School of Drama and Music. She acted in and directed works at the Factory Theatre, Tarragon Theatre and Nightwood Theatre in Toronto.

Her one-woman show Motherhood, Madness and the Shape of the Universe was performed across Canada and Britain, and was adapted for CBC Radio; and her other one-woman show Waiting for Michelangelo opened at the Baby Grand Studio in the Grand Theatre Kingston in April 2009.

In 2006, Renders became a professor at Queen's University in the drama department (Dan School of Drama and Music). She also taught in the department of gender studies. In 2012, Renders was given tenure and appointed an associate professor. Renders contributed several articles to the Canadian Theatre Review.

== Works ==
Plays:

- Gently Down the Stream
- Soft Boiled
- Soft Boiled #2 - co-written with Maureen White
- Soft Boiled #3
- Notes on a Tumour - co-written with Christopher Thomas
- Peace Banquet: Ancient Greece Meets the Atomic Age - co-written with Micah Barnes, Sky Gilbert, Dean Gilmour, Cynthia Grant, Charis Polatos, Judith Rudakoff, Philip Shepherd, and Maureen White
- The Kingdom of LoudAsCanBe
- Motherhood, Madness and the Shape of the Universe
- Waiting for Michelangelo

Canadian Theatre Review Articles:

- "Required Reading" (2007)
- "Am I Seeing Double, or is This Shakespeare?" (2008)
- "In the Room the Women Come and Go, Talking of Growing Old" (2008)
- "My Uth Ink experience in Ottawa" (2011)

== Awards ==
She was made an Honorary Member of the Association of Canadian Theatre Research for her role as founding member of Nightwood Theatre and was awarded the Maggie Bassett Award by Theatre Ontario for distinguished service to theatre in Ontario in 1995.

== Personal life ==
Renders married Robert Lindsay in 1987. The two met while performing As You Like It. They had two children, Finn and Jill Lindsay.

Renders died on July 17, 2018, in Kingston, Ontario, at age 63 due to complications from cancer.

== Legacy ==
The Storefront Fringe Festival installed "Kim's Couch" to honour Renders' contributions to theatre. The Reelout Queer Film Festival named the Kim Renders Outstanding Performance Award after Renders.
