= Jonathan Tammuz =

British-Canadian film director

Jonathan Tammuz is a British-Canadian film director, best known for directing the short film The Childeater and the feature film Rupert's Land. The Childeater was a shortlisted Academy Award nominee for Best Live Action Short Film at the 62nd Academy Awards, and Rupert's Land was a Genie Award nominee for Best Picture at the 19th Genie Awards, with Tammuz also nominated for Best Director.

The son of Israeli writer Benjamin Tammuz, he grew up in England where his father was a cultural attaché at the Israeli embassy and a writer in residence at Oxford University. He met and married Lib Stephen, a Canadian, when they were both studying at England's National Film and Television School; Stephen was the screenwriter for both The Childeater and Tammuz's film Cordoba. Tammuz subsequently directed a 1997 film adaptation of his father's novel Minotaur before making Rupert's Land.

Tammuz and Stephen currently reside in Vancouver, British Columbia, where they are partners in a production firm; Tammuz is also a film instructor at Langara College and Stephen also works as an illustrator.

== Filmography ==
Short film

Year	Title	Director	Producer
1990	The Child Eater	Yes	No
1998	House Arrest	No	Yes
1999	All American Hero	No	Yes
2000	Abe's Manhood	No	Yes
2012	A Mother's Love	No	Yes
2015	50/50	Yes	No
2019	Heard from Above	Yes	Yes
2023	Bet Your Bottom Dollar	No	Yes
2025	Whispers of Freedom	No	Yes
TBC	I'll Get By	No	Yes

Feature film

Year	Title	Director	Producer
1989	Streets of Yesterday	No	Yes
1997	Minotaur	Yes	No
1998	Rupert's Land	Yes	No
2019	Red Snow	No	Yes

Television

Year	Title	Note
2003	Street Time	Episode "Brothers"

== Accolades ==
Year	Body	Award	Nominated work	Result	Ref
1989	Academy of Motion Picture Arts and Sciences	Best Live Action Short Film (62nd Academy Awards)	The Child Eater	Nominated	
1989	Chicago International Film Festival	Golden Hugo Award	The Child Eater	Nominated	
1999	Genie Awards	Best Achievement in Direction	Rupert's Land	Nominated	
1999	Leo Awards	Best Direction in a Feature Length Drama	Rupert's Land	Nominated	
2012	Lucerne International Film Festival	Production of Short Film	A Mother's Love	Nominated	
2019	Edmonton International Film Festival	Canadian Feature Award	Red Snow	Won	
2023	Sweden Film Awards	Best Producer	Bet Your Bottom Dollar	Won	
2023	Tatras International Film Festival	Best Short Film	Bet Your Bottom Dollar	Nominated	
2023	Movie Play International Film Festival	Best Short Film	Bet Your Bottom Dollar	Nominated	
2023	EdiPlay International Film Festival	Best Short Film	Bet Your Bottom Dollar	Nominated	
