= Canadian Theatre Review =

- Discipline: Theatre
- Language: English
- Edited by: Jenn Stephenson

Publication details
- History: 1975–present
- Publisher: University of Toronto Press
- Frequency: Quarterly

Standard abbreviations
- ISO 4: Can. Theatre Rev.

Indexing
- ISSN: 0315-0836 (print); 1920-941X (web)

Links
- Journal homepage

The Canadian Theatre Review is a quarterly magazine publishing critical analysis and coverage of current theatre developments, expanding the practice of criticism in Canadian theatre. It is published by the University of Toronto Press and is available in print and online. The Canadian Theatre Review was founded by Don Rubin.

== Abstracting and indexing ==
CTR is abstracted and indexed in:

- Canadian Almanac & Directory
- Canadian Periodical Index
- Canadian Reference Centre
- CrossRef
- EJS EBSCO Electronic Journals Service
- Google Scholar
- International Bibliography of Book Reviews of Scholarly Literature on the Humanities and Social Sciences (IBR)
- International Bibliography of Periodical Literature on the Humanities and Social Sciences (IBZ)
- Project MUSE
- Microsoft Academic Search
- Scopus
- International Bibliography of Theatre & Dance
- Ulrich's Periodicals Directory
