= Cynthia Grant (director) =

Canadian theatre director

- Occupations: Theatre director; Artistic director
- Known for: Co-founder of Nightwood Theatre Co-founder of Company of Sirens

Cynthia Grant is a Canadian theatre director. Grant was a founding member of Nightwood Theatre and served as the company's first artistic director. Grant later co-founded Company of Sirens.

== Career ==
Grant, along with co-founders Kim Renders, Mary Vingoe and Maureen White, started Nightwood Theatre in 1979. Though Nightwood began as a collective, Grant served as its founding artistic director. It is unclear at what point Grant officially assumed the title.

At Nightwood, Grant occasionally acted in shows such as Peter Handke's Self-Accusation (1980) and Ann-Marie MacDonald's Nancy Drew (Goes in Search of Her Missing Mother) (1984). Grant directed many shows at Nightwood including The True Story of Ida Johnson (1979), Mary Vingoe's Ten Seconds After Closing (1980), The Yellow Wallpaper (1981), Flashbacks of Tomorrow (1981), Mass/Age (1982), Antigone (1983), Brian Metcalfe's Pink Flies! (1984), Love and Work Enough (1984, with Mary Vingoe), Baņuta Rubess' Pope Joan (1984), Amanda Hale's The Medical Show (1984), and Jovette Marchessault's The Edge of the Earth is Too Near, Violette LeDuc (1985). She left Nightwood Theatre in 1985.

Around the time of Nightwood's founding, Grant was on the board that founded The Theatre Centre in Toronto. Grant wrote, performed, and directed Psycho Nuclear Breakdown at the spring 1980 Rhubarb! Festival.

In 1986, Grant co-founded Company of Sirens with Lina Chartrand, Aida Jordão, Catherine Glen, Lib Spry, and Shawna Dempsey. Company of Sirens was founded as a feminist theatre company with a focus on developing productions to inspire social change. In 1991, Company of Sirens produced Djuna: What Of The Night, a piece co-created and performed by Grant and Svetlana Zylin and inspired by the life and works of Djuna Barnes.

From 2003 to 2005, Grant was a faculty member of McMaster University's School of the Arts. While working at McMaster, Grant directed several shows including The Destruction of Eve by Svetlana Zylin in 2004.

== Plays ==
- Peace Banquet: Ancient Greece Meets the Atomic Age - co-written with Micah Barnes, Sky Gilbert, Dean Gilmour, Charis Polatos, Kim Renders, Judith Rudakoff, Philip Shepherd, and Maureen White
- Psycho Nuclear Breakdown
- Djuna: What Of The Night - co-created with Svetlana Zylin
