= David Sereda =

Canadian musician (born 1957)

- Born: 1957 (age 68–69); Edmonton, Alberta
- Occupations: singer; playwright; composer

David Sereda (born c. 1957) is a Canadian musician, singer, playwright, pianist and composer. Sereda was born and raised in Edmonton, Alberta. He graduated from the Playhouse Acting School in Vancouver (1977) under teacher Powys Thomas, and has since worked in music, music theatre and alternative theatre across Canada. He released his first album in 1981, Chivalry Lives, which gave Sereda critical acclaim in Canadian newspapers both for the range of music and the openness of the lyrics: "Mark" and "Underage Blues" both speak from a gay male perspective, a rarity at the time.

He resettled in Toronto, Ontario and worked in theatre again both as actor and as music director and composer at Buddies in Bad Times Theatre, the Theatre Centre and the Tarragon Theatre, where he co-wrote two musicals, Love Jive! (nominated for a Dora Award) and Siren Song with playwright and novelist Don Hannah. He released The Price of Love in 1985 and The Blue Guide in 1994.

He relocated to Grey County where he works with the community arts company Sheatre. He co-produces the occasional Stray Dog Salons in Toronto, evenings of music, poetry and theatre. Other works: with Sheatre, the musical with Joan Chandler entitled TOM, based on the life and passion of painter Tom Thomson, Be Our Ally, a Forum theatre play with music about homophobia, and the Dementia Play; in performance with novelist and poet Anne Michaels, Dialogues of readings and songs including two based on Michaels' works All We Saw and Infinite Gradation. Their most recent collaboration is The Woods Are Burning (original text by Michaels, songs by and collected by sereda, on Tom Thomson).

== Discography ==
- 1981 - Chivalry Lives
- 1985 - The Price of Love
- 1994 - The Blue Guide
