= Leslee Silverman =

Canadian theatre director

Leslee Silverman is a Canadian theatre director, recognized for theatre for young audiences.

She founded the Manitoba Theatre for Young People in 1982. Her awards and honours include the Silver Jubilee Commemorative Medal (1992); YWCA Woman of Distinction Award (2001); first recipient, Manitoba Arts Council Award of Distinction (2003); City of Winnipeg Certificate of Appreciation (2003); Honorary Member, Association for Canadian Theatre Research (2004). In 2010, MTYP received the Human Rights Commitment Award for "promoting human rights and social transformation for almost 30 years.", and the Governor General's Award for Lifetime Achievement in the Performing Arts (Theatre). She was instrumental in establishing the Canwest Global Performing Arts Centre, the only purpose-built young people's theatre facility in English Canada.

Ms. Silverman received a BA (English) from the University of Manitoba and an MA (Developmental Drama) from the University of Colorado. Before embarking on a full-time theatre career, she worked as a freelance director, youth outreach worker and education researcher.
