= John Varszegi =

Canadian cinematographer

John Varszegi is a Canadian screenwriter, director, editor, and composer. He began his career in film as a freelance film critic and journalist. In the 1990s, he became a screenwriter for the Dayka Theatre in Vancouver, British Columbia. In 2007, he founded the HTVBC Film Studio in Victoria, British Columbia. He has produced over 130 documentaries, short films, television news segments and reports, and music videos, as well as several feature-length films. In addition to receiving numerous awards, he has been a finalist at the 2018 Reel International Film Festival (Perth, Australia), the "Detective FEST 2014" International Film and Television Festival (Moscow, Russia), the International Short Film Festival in Cannes (France)—on four separate occasions—and the Vancouver International Film Festival; he has also achieved high rankings in several international music video competitions. Following the outbreak of the COVID-19 pandemic—which led to the closure of the film studio—he continued his work as a composer for film and theatre within the studio’s audio division (Digital Euphony Sound Studio). He has composed scores for over 70 films and stage productions, as well as two musicals.

== Musical Works ==
- Hundred Years On Stage - musical (2026) - romantic musical theatre work
- The Plains Of Abraham - patriotic national musical (2025) - dramatic musical theatre work

== Scriptography ==
- You'll Be My Husband - TV film (2018) Genre: romantic comedy
- A Piece of Cake - stage play (2018) Genre: comedy
- The Five Virtues - TV film (2017) Genre: mystery drama
- The Wage of Captivity - TV film (2016) Genre: crime drama
- Hunter - TV series (2015) Genre: action thriller
- The 10 Dimensions Theory - feature film (2013) Genre: sci-fi action thriller
- Steinway Grand - TV film (2012) Genre: comedy drama
- Recess - stage play (1998) - Dayka Theatre, Vancouver, BC
- My Wife, the Superstar - stage play (1998) - Dayka Theatre, Vancouver, BC
- Who’s coming to us? - stage play (1997) - Dayka Theatre, Vancouver, BC
- Man of Honour - stage play (1997) - Dayka Theatre, Vancouver, BC

== Filmography ==
- You'll Be My Husband - TV film (2020) Genre: romantic comedy - Suspended due to Covid'19 pandemic.
- A Piece of Cake - TV film (2018) Genre: comedy
- I Am Hamlet - TV film (2018) Genre: comedy drama
- The Five Virtues - TV film (2017) Genre: mystery drama
- The Wage of Captivity - TV film (2016) Genre: crime drama
- How My Parents Met - TV film (2016) Genre: crime comedy
- Dangerous Theories - TV film (2016) Genre: action sci fi
- Hunter - TV film (2015) Genre: action thriller
- The Island of a Thousand Cultures - TV Series 12/12 (2013–14) Genre: documentary
- Dimension Folders (work title: The 10 Dimension Theory) - feature film (2013) Genre: sci fi action thriller
- Unsound Innocence - feature film (2012) Genre: psycho-thriller drama
- Steinway Grand - TV film (2012) Genre: comedy drama
- Decision Factor - feature film (2011) Genre: romantic comedy
- The Sea of Music - short film (2011) Genre: music video
- The Long Walk - short film (2011) Genre: drama
- Runaround Sue - short film (2011) Genre: music video
- Heads and Tales - short film (2011) Genre: romantic comedy
- The Mayas - short film (2010) Genre: documentary
- Whistler Winter Olympic Games - short film (2010) Genre: report film
- Blind Date - short film (2010) Genre: romantic comedy
- Heroes Among Us - short film (2010) Genre: documentary
- Kilauea Volcano - short film (2010) Genre: documentary
- 20 Weeks - short film (2010) Genre: documentary
- For Giving Me Meaning – short film (2010) Genre: romantic comedy
- Macbeth - short film (2009) Genre: drama
- You are vain - short film (2009) Genre: music video
- Blue Planet - short film (2009) Genre: music video
- Love Train - short film (2009) Genre: music video
- European Moments - short film (2009) Genre: music video
- Four Seasons - short film (2009) Genre: music video
- Victoria My Love - short film (2009) Genre: music video
- Tear the World Down - short film (2009) Genre: music video
- Walk of Life (1-5) - short films (2008) Genre: report documentary
- Chinese Dance - short film (2008) Genre: report documentary
- Victoria Day - short film (2008) Genre: report documentary
- AT&T - short film (2008) Genre: commercial
- Logitech - short film (2008) Genre: commercial
- Kodak - short film (2008) Genre: commercial
- ING Direct - short film (2007) Genre: commercial
- E-Insurance - short film (2007) Genre: commercial
- Budweiser - short film (2007) Genre: commercial
- Luster - short film (2007) Genre: commercial
- Binaca - short film (2007) Genre: commercial
- Panthene - short film (2007) Genre: commercial
- Kushyfoot - short film (2007) Genre: commercial
- Cocaine - short film (2006) Genre: comedy
- Leave it to Uncle Willy (1-12) - short films (2006) Genre: comedy series
- BC TV News (1-12) - short films (2006) Genre: TV News
- Ice Fishing - short film (2006) Genre: documentary
- Kelowna Wineries - short film (2006) Genre: documentary
- Carnations - short film (2006) Genre: romantic comedy
- Butchart Gardens - short film (2006) Genre: documentary
- There is Still Hope - short film (2005) Genre: experimental
- Mother - short film (2005) Genre: experimental
- Fear Not - short film (2005) Genre: experimental
- Modern Tales - short film (2005) Genre: experimental
- Absurds - short film (2005) Genre: experimental
- My Me - short film (2005) Genre: experimental

== DVD Releases ==
- Hunter - feature, crime drama (2015)
- Dimension Folders - feature, sci fi action (2013)
- Unsound Innocence - feature, psycho drama (2013)
- Steinway Grand - feature, comedy-drama (2013)
- Decision Factor - feature, romantic comedy (2013)

== TV shows ==
"I Am Hamlet" comedy drama was first aired Aug 20, 2018 18:00 on Canada TV Channel 4.

"A Piece of Cake" comedy was first aired July 9, 2018 20:00 on Canada TV Channel 4.

"The Five Virtues" mystery drama was first aired Sept 18, 2017 12:00 on Canada TV Channel 4.

"The Wage of Captivity" thriller drama was first aired Nov 22, 2016 23:00 on Canada TV Channel 4.

"How My Parents Met" crime comedy was first aired May 31, 2016 13:00 on Canada TV Channel 4.

"Dangerous Theories" action sci fi was first aired January, 2016 22:00 on Canada TV Channel 4.

"Hunter" crime drama was first aired Oct 20, 2015 23:00 on Canada TV Channel 4.

"The Island of a Thousand Cultures" TV series Episode 01/12 was first aired Sept 14, 2013 09:00 on Canada TV Channel 4.

"Steinway Grand" comedy drama was first aired July 21, 2013 19:00 on Canada TV Channel 4.

"The Long Walk" film drama was first aired July 5, 2013 23:45 on Canada TV Channel 4.
