= The Winnipeg Singers =

- Origin: Manitoba, Canada
- Genres: Choral
- Website: winnipegsingers.com

The Winnipeg Singers are a 24 voice chamber choir from Canada led by director Yuri Klaz. Choirs from Around the World called it "one of Canada's premier choirs, follows a rich tradition of choral music in Winnipeg.

== Membership ==
The Winnipeg Singers currently consists of 24 singers (6 sopranos, 6 altos, 6 tenors and 6 basses), an accompanist and director Yuri Klaz.

== Touring ==
In 1989, The Winnipeg Singers conducted a three-week tour of Austria and West Germany, serving as choir-in residence at the Classical Music Festival in Eisestadt, Austria. In the spring of 1999, they toured Alberta and Saskatchewan. The Winnipeg Singers performed at the Toronto International Choral Festival in June 2002. In May 2004, the choir performed at the Gala Concert of Podium 2004, the national biennial convention of the Association of Canadian Choral Conductors, held in Winnipeg. The Winnipeg Singers traveled to Taiwan and Japan in July 2005 where the choir was honoured to represent Canada at the 6th Taipei International Choral Festival and the 7th World Symposium on Choral Music in Kyoto. While in Japan, the choir performed in Setagaya, a sister-city of Winnipeg, in Tokyo at the Canadian Embassy and in Kobe for a Symposium sponsored satellite concert.

== Discography ==
- (1997) O Praise Ye the Lord
- (1998) Prairie Voices
