= Shawna Dempsey and Lorri Millan =

Canadian performance art duo

Shawna Dempsey and Lorri Millan are a Canadian performance art duo who, since 1989, have collaborated on performances, films, videos, publications and public art projects. Both out lesbians, Dempsey and Millan collaborate most commonly on humorous performances addressing lesbian and feminist themes in a variety of media, including film, video and live performance poetry. Dempsey and Millan are based out of Winnipeg, and have toured and performed worldwide. Their work has been featured in four retrospectives.

Their most well-known works are the music video "We're Talking Vulva" (a segment of the movie Five Feminist Minutes), the performance video "What Does a Lesbian Look Like?", which was in regular rotation on MuchMusic in the 1990s and was featured on the spoken word poetry compilation album Word Up. They are widely known as the Lesbian Rangers of Lesbian National Parks and Services. Their use of costumes and props in narrative skits enables them to make performance parodies of what is officially sanctioned as normal and legitimate.

In the early 2020s they were involved in the design of Thunderhead, which was announced in March 2022 as the winning design proposal for the new LGBTQ2+ National Monument in Ottawa.

== Selected performances ==
=== Astroart Space Corps ===
Astroart Space Corps was a performance for Nuit Blanche 2014 in Calgary, Alberta. Dempsey and Millan attended as commanders of the PANDORA I space shuttle, taking a break from training to sign commemorative photographs.

=== Grocery Store ===
For Grocery Store, Dempsey and Milan, along with Jake Moore and Zab, worked together as the Co-Op Collective to turn Ace Art Gallery in downtown Winnipeg into a functioning grocery store, providing "food and food for thought" to serve the downtown core of the city and bring attention to the lack of essential provisions in the area. The collective ran ads on the radio, an advertising circular, and a mail-in coupon campaign directed at the mayor to request the creation of real services in the area. They collective sold over $5,000 worth of groceries in August 2002.

=== Lesbian National Parks & Services ===
Lesbian National Parks & Services is an ongoing series of performances, videos and printed matter. Dressed as park rangers, the duo sought to "queery[...] that icon of Canadianness" through their site-specific performances satirizing the commodification of the Banff wilderness. Dempsey and Millan handed out maps of Banff, including real and imaginary tourist attractions, such as "Invisible Lesbian Heritage House and Gardens" and the "Invisible Plaque Dedicated to our Founding Foremothers." Dempsey and Millan released the Lesbian National Parks and Services Field Guide to North America: Flora, Fauna & Survival Skills in 2002. Dempsy and Millan performed a tour of duty in 2008 as a part of the Land Matters series at the University of Lethbridge Art Gallery.

== Selected film and video ==
- Consideration Liberation Army
- A Day in The Life of a Bull Dyke (1995)
- What Does a Lesbian Look Like?
- Object/Subject of Desire
- We're Talking Vulva

== Installations ==
- Miss Gray's Marvellous Truth Machine
- Wild Ride
- Archaeology and You
- Mirror Mirror
- One Gay City

== Publications ==
- Dempsey, Shawna and Lorri Millan. Anatomy of a Nymphomaniac. Winnipeg: disOrientation Chapbooks, 1997.
- Bedtime Stories for the Edge of the World. Winnipeg: Arbeiter Ring Publishing, 2012.
- Handbook of the Junior Lesbian Ranger. Winnipeg: Finger in the Dyke Productions, 1995.
- In the LIFE: Portrait of a Modern Sex-Deviant. Winnipeg: Finger in the Dyke Productions, 1995.
- Lesbian National Parks and Services Field Guide to North America: Flora, Fauna & Survival Skills. Toronto: Pedlar Press, 2002.
- Mary Medusa: A Testimonial. Winnipeg: Finger in the Dyke Productions, 1992.
- Winnipeg Tarot Co. Tarot Deck. Winnipeg: Finger in the Dyke Productions, 2010.

== Prizes and awards ==
Dempsey and Millan have received many awards, including the Canadian Museums Association Award for Outstanding Publication and the Manitoba Arts Council Special Prize for Innovation and Excellence. In 2018, they were awarded the Manitoba Arts Award of Distinction, which recognizes long-term achievement at the highest level of excellence of an artist in the province.
