= Theatre Kingston =

Theatre company in Kingston, Ontario, Canada

Theatre Kingston is a theatre company located in Kingston, Ontario, Canada.

Founded in 1990 as Theatre Beyond by Paul Gelineau, the company became The People's Theatre Kingston in 1992 and had two more Artistic Directors under that name—Kathryn MacKay (1993–94) and Kathleen LeRoux (1994–97). In late 1997, Craig Walker, was appointed as artistic director. In early 1998 the company shortened its name to Theatre Kingston and moved into the Baby Grand Studio in downtown Kingston, where it began offering a full season of four or more productions a year.

Under the name Theatre Kingston, the company began to gain a reputation not only for the high quality but the unusual nature of its productions. These include two co-productions with the local French theatre company, Les Treteaux de Kingston, of bilingual plays: David Fennario's Balconville and Marianne Ackerman's L'Affaire Tartuffe; the second professional productions of Ann-Marie MacDonald's The Arab's Mouth and Judith Thompson's Perfect Pie; uncommon approaches to more familiar plays: such as Judith Thompson's Lion in the Streets—which was presented in the round on a sand-floor in a setting which resembled a cross between a public park and a bull-ring; an eerie version of Henry James' ghost story, The Turn of the Screw in the adaptation by Jeffrey Hatcher, which took place in a long dark hallway with the two performers—the Governess and a man who played all the other roles—picked out by spots of light; and Bernard Shaw's Pygmalion—which was set as if in the playwright's own study, Shaw himself narrating, dressing the stage, playing the minor characters and filling out the story with short scenes drawn from his own screenplay. The company has also presented several world premieres, including "Big Ticket" by Jim Garrard 2025, Blood River by Chole Whitehorn, which brought to light the struggles of women's reproductive rights, Rosemary Doyle's "EEN" 2023 and "Hands in Her Pockets" 2026 an innovative new play about two deaf film actors and performed in ASL, Meltdown, John Lazarus's astonishing retelling of the myth of Daedalus, Icarus and the Minotaur; the collectively created community play about Kingston's social stratification, Princess Street: The Great Divide; Fred Euringer's Night Noises, about a nineteenth-century nutritionist who connived at the starvation deaths of his own children, and Craig Walker's Chantecler, a musical based loosely on the play by Edmond Rostand and his Finnegans Wake: a dream play, an innovative adaptation from the novel by James Joyce which enjoyed a successful run not only in Kingston, but at the Tarragon Theatre in Toronto. The Globe and Mail declared this a "brilliant" production which showed "amazing theatrical panache"and which they remounted in 2026. In 2004, Theatre Kingston took Walker's production of Shakespeare's The Winter's Tale to Harbourfront in Toronto. EYE Magazine called it a "moving and insightful production" that "ma[de] the work shine like new." In 2001, in association with Queen's University, the company created a children's theatre troupe, The Barefoot Players, which tours the parks and libraries of the Kingston region every summer. In early 2024, The Barefoot Players announced that they would no longer be operating.

Theatre Kingston also administers the TKFringe Festival, part of The Kick & Push Festival.

== Artistic directors ==
- Paul Gelineau (1990-1993)
- Kathryn MacKay (1993-1994)
- Kathleen leRoux (1994-1997)
- Craig Walker (1997-2007)
- Kim Renders (2007-2011)
- Brett Christopher (2011-2017)
- Rosemary Doyle (2018-pres.)
