= Great Canadian Theatre Company =

Theatre company in Ottawa, Ontario, Canada

Coordinates: 45.400067°N 75.731839°W

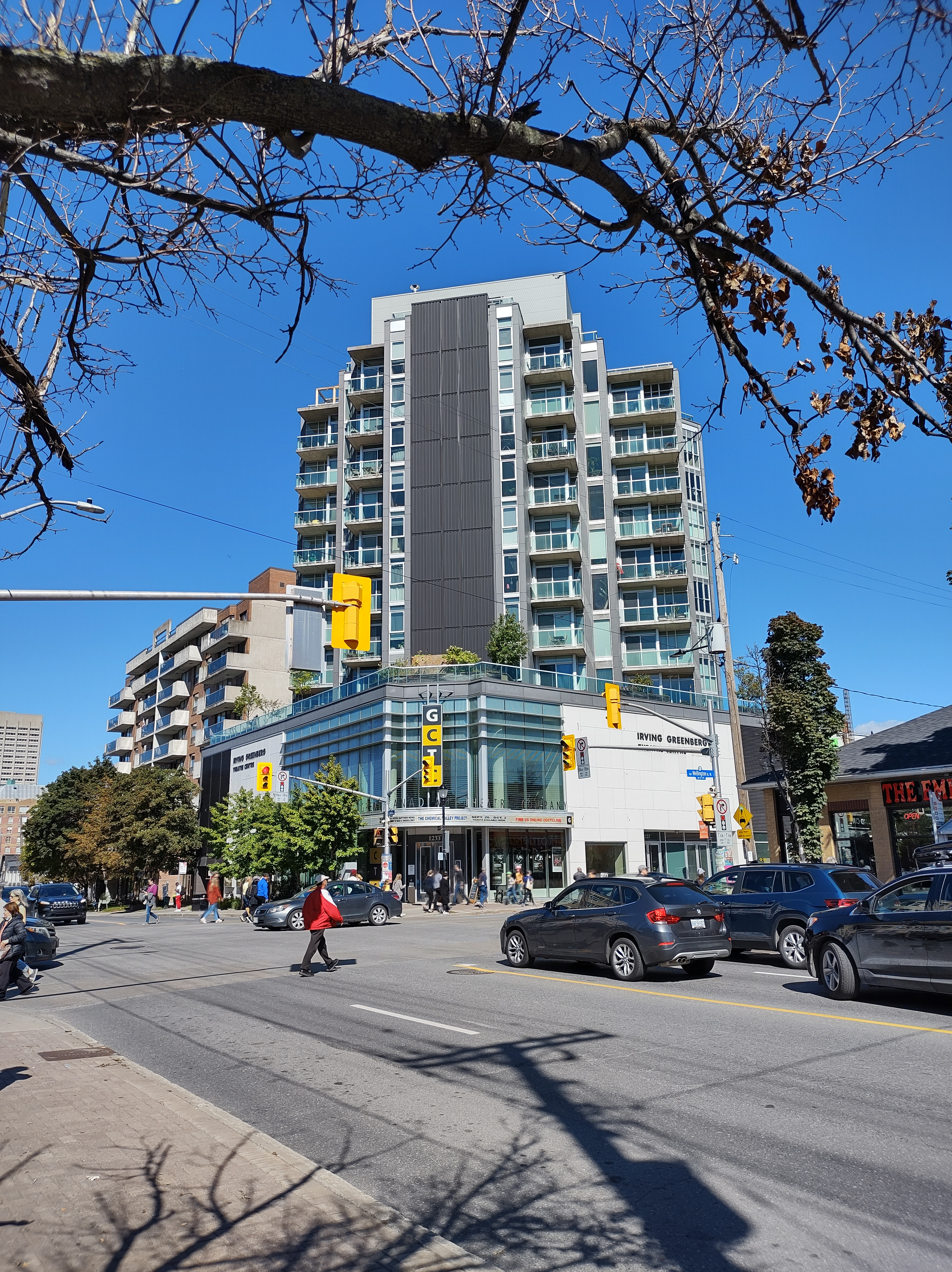
Irving Greenberg Theatre Centre (Summer, 2022)

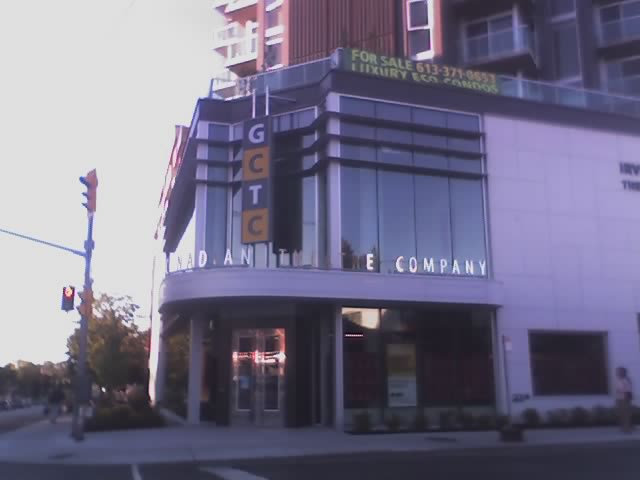
Irving Greenberg Theatre Centre, home of GCTC since September 2007

The Great Canadian Theatre Company (GCTC) is a professional theatre company based in Ottawa, Ontario, Canada. It was established in 1975 by a group of professors and graduate students at Carleton University. Riding a wave of cultural nationalism, founders Robin Mathews, Larry McDonald, Bill Law, Greg Reid and Lois Shannon envisioned a theatre company that would produce only Canadian plays, especially those with social and political relevance. Driven by a dream to place Canadian stories and Canadian history front and centre in our country’s universities and theatres, the company launched its first production in August 1975.

The group has its origins in a season of Canadian theatre produced by the Sock 'n' Buskin Theatre Company at Carleton University. From Carleton, the company moved to a converted firehall in Ottawa South (presently the Ottawa South Community Centre) and then, in 1982, to the Gladstone Theatre on Gladstone Avenue.

The Irving Greenberg Theatre Centre, which includes a 262-seat Mainstage theatre, a flexible black box studio theatre, and two spacious lobbies, has allowed GCTC to expand its community-based activities. More than 35,000 people visit the Irving Greenberg Theatre Centre every year to see productions by GCTC and other live performing arts companies, for concerts such as the Acoustic Waves music series, to visit the Lorraine Fritzi Yale Art Gallery, rent the facility, or to enjoy local homemade fare at the Viva Loca Café.

The September 2007 issue of (Cult)ure Magazine described the GCTC as "Ottawa’s pre-eminent promoter of Canadian theatrical content."

In 2004, GCTC announced that the family of the late Irving Greenberg was donating $2.5 million towards the construction of a new home for GCTC at the corner of Holland and Wellington. Construction of the Irving Greenberg Theatre Centre began in the fall of 2005. In the summer of 2007, GCTC moved to the Irving Greenberg Theatre Centre and launched a new era in the company’s history.

== Associated playwrights ==
- Jean-Marc Dalpé
- David French
- Linda Griffiths
- Wendy Lill
- Ann-Marie MacDonald
- Arthur Milner
- Morris Panych
- Judith Thompson
- Michel Tremblay
- George F. Walker
