= Jennifer Brewin =

Canadian writer, director, and artistic director

- Education: Queen's University; University of Calgary (MFA)
- Occupation: Artistic director
- Writing career
- Notable work: The Attic, the Pearls and Three Fine Girls

Jennifer Brewin is a Canadian writer, director, and artistic director. She is known for co-creating The Attic, the Pearls and Three Fine Girls and her other work with Common Boots Theatre, formerly known as Theatre Columbus and the Caravan Farm Theatre. In 2020, she was appointed the artistic director of the Globe Theatre in Regina.

== Career ==
After graduating from Queen's University she joined Toronto's Common Boots Theatre as the indie theatre company's first general manager. It was there she developed a theatre practice rooted in physical theatre and collaborative creation.

In 1994, she directed Eugène Ionesco's Rhinoceros at the Harbourfront Centre.

The Attic, the Pearls and Three Fine Girls, a collective creation with Brewin, Martha Ross, Ann-Marie MacDonald, Alisa Palmer, and Leah Cherniak, premiered in 1995. Brewin was credited as a dramaturg of this production. By the time the show was re-staged in 1997, Brewin was referred to as a "contributing artist".

Brewin directed Larry Lewis's Irreleva in 1996 at Theatre Centre West. Between 1998 and 2005, Brewin was co-artistic director of Caravan Farm Theatre in British Columbia. While working with Caravan Farm Theatre, Brewin wrote and directed twelve outdoor theatre productions.

In 2010, Brewin succeeded Cherniak and Ross and became artistic director of Common Boots Theatre, formerly known as Theatre Columbus. As artistic director, Brewin initiated The Public Servant, a collective creation centering Canadian public sector workers. Brewin acted as dramaturge for the projects final script, which premiered in 2015. Brewin also initiated a yearly family holiday "walkabout" show at the Evergreen Brickworks, partly inspired by her outdoor work at Caravan Theatre. The first walkabout show was Ross's The Story, a retelling of the Nativity, in 2011. The Story was repeated as the company's 2012 outdoor holiday show.

Brewin, alongside Palmer, MacDonald, Cherniak, Ross, created a sequel to The Attic, the Pearls and Three Fine Girls called More Fine Girls, which premiered in 2011. Brewin assistant directed the premiere at Tarragon Theatre.

In 2013, Brewin directed Natasha Greenblatt's The Peace Maker. The Common Boots 2013 holiday show was Weather The Weather, Or How We Make it Home Together written by Haley McGee and directed by Brewin. In 2014, Common Boots, under Brewin's artistic direction, launched their first Minister's Play, a take on The Vicar of Dibley, as a fundraised for the company's new play development program. This fundraising initiative was reprised in 2015, featuring another version of the play, this time, by Arthur Milner. Brewin directed Ross' The Dog and the Angel as Common Boots' 2014 walkabout holiday show. In 2015, Brewin directed Linda Griffiths' Age of Arousal at Factory Theatre. Later that year, she directed Tails From The City (by Marjorie Chan) as Common Boots' outdoor holiday show.

At the 2019 Toronto Fringe Festival, Brewin co-directed (with Alex Bulmer) Scadding, a show consisting of six short audio plays, including one written by Brewin herself. Later in 2019, Brewin directed Natasha Greenblatt and Yolanda Bonnell's The Election at Nightwood Theatre.

Brewin was appointed artistic director of Regina's Globe Theatre in fall 2020, succeeding interim artistic director, Geoffrey Whynot. Much of her premiere season was cancelled due to COVID-19 pandemic restrictions. Her first live theatre production as artistic director was a series of ghost tours. Brewin created a purely audio version of Ross's The Story, which she had previously directed with both Caravan Theatre and Common Boots.

== Plays ==
- The Attic, the Pearls and Three Fine Girls (1995) – co-created with Martha Ross, Ann-Marie MacDonald, Alisa Palmer, and Leah Cherniak
- More Fine Girls (2011) – co-created with Martha Ross, Ann-Marie MacDonald, Alisa Palmer, and Leah Cherniak
- The Public Servant (2015) – co-created with Sarah McVie, Amy Rutherford, and Haley McGee
- Scadding (2019) – co-created with Alex Bulmer, Leah Cherniak, Khadijah Roberts-Abdullah, John Gzowski, Maggie Huculak, Anand Rajaram, Jenny Salisbury and Stephon Smith

== Personal life ==
In 2025 Brewin earned an MFA in radio drama at the University of Calgary. She lives in Regina, Saskatchewan with her husband, Arthur Milner.
