= Wilfred Josephs =

English composer

Wilfred Josephs (24 July 1927 – 17 November 1997) was an English composer.

== Life ==
Born in Gosforth, Newcastle upon Tyne, the fourth and youngest son of Russian and South Shields Jewish parents, Wilfred Josephs had his first musical studies in Newcastle with Arthur Milner, and showed early promise, but was persuaded by his parents to take up a 'sensible' career. He subsequently became a dentist, qualifying as a Bachelor of Dental Surgery of the University of Durham in 1951. He later studied at the Guildhall School in London.

In 1963 his Requiem, a complete setting of the Hebrew Kaddish, written in memory of the Jews who were murdered in the Holocaust, won the first International Composing Competition of the City of Milan and La Scala – then the biggest musical award in the world, after which he gave up dentistry and became a full-time composer. The Requiem was performed by Nino Sanzogno in Milan, Maurice Handford for the BBC, Max Rudolf in Cincinnati, and Giulini in Chicago. A recording was made by David Measham for Unicorn Kanchana.

Josephs was awarded an honorary Doctorate of Music of Newcastle University in 1978. In October 1996, a concert of his works was given at Newcastle University in his presence. He died in London in 1997, leaving a wife, Valerie, and two daughters, Claudia and Philippa. The Wilfred Josephs Society continues to promote his works, the president of which was Sir Charles Mackerras.

== Works ==
Wilfred Josephs was a prolific composer and his classical works include 12 symphonies, 22 concertos, overtures, chamber music, operas, ballets, vocal works – almost all of which had been written to commission. An exception was Requiescant pro defunctis, a string quartet composed as Josephs' personal response to newsreel footage of Auschwitz shown at the time of the Adolf Eichmann trial. This string quartet became the basis of the Kaddish Requiem.

Josephs is best remembered for composing the music for such television series as Chiller Theatre (1961), The Great War (1964), Horizon (1964), Theatre 625 (1965), Talking to a Stranger (1966), Weavers Green (1966), W. Somerset Maugham (1969), Cider with Rosie (1971), The Guardians (1971) I, Claudius (1976), Disraeli (1978), The Ghosts of Motley Hall (1976), Enemy at the Door (1978), The Voyage of Charles Darwin (1978), Pride and Prejudice (1980), The Brief (1984) and The Return of the Antelope (1986), as well as incidental music for The Prisoner (1967). His film scores include Cash on Demand (1961), Two Letter Alibi (1962), Fanatic (1965), The Deadly Bees (1966), Hostile Witness (1968), My Side of the Mountain (1969), Cry of the Banshee (1970), Dark Places (1973), Callan (1974), Swallows and Amazons (1974), All Creatures Great and Small (1975), The Uncanny (1977), Martin's Day (1985) and Mata Hari (1985).

In 1966, under the pseudonym Wilfred Wylam, Josephs composed the score for Man of Magic, a musical based on the life of magician Harry Houdini, with book by John Morley and Aubrey Cash. Produced by impresario Harold Fielding, the show opened at the Manchester Opera House on 22 October before transferring to the Piccadilly Theatre in London where it ran for 135 performances.

His other notable works include an opera, Rebecca (1983), based on Daphne du Maurier's novel, a ballet Cyrano (1991) and the Aelian Dances, based on Newcastle folk songs (the title is a reference to Newcastle's Roman name), a music theatre piece in memory of his nephew, A Child of the Universe, Op. 80, and a children's opera, Alice in Wonderland, Op. 144 (1985–1988).

=== Recordings ===
- Requiem, Robert Dawe, baritone; Daphne Harris, soprano (2nd movement – Yitgadal); Adelaide String Quartet, with Pamela de Almeida, 2nd cello; Adelaide Chorus; Adelaide Symphony Orchestra, David Measham, Unicorn-Kanchana LP DKP 9032 (released on double CD in November 2015 – Lyrita SRCD.2352)
