= Alex Bulmer =

Canadian playwright and theatre artist

- Born: Kitchener, Ontario, Canada
- Education: Royal Central School of Speech and Drama
- Occupation: Playwright
- Notable work: Cast Offs; Smudge
- Website: www.alexbulmer.co.uk

Alex Bulmer is a Canadian playwright and theatre artist. Bulmer is the co-founder of the theatre companies SNIFF Inc. and Invisible Flash. She wrote the play Smudge and was a writer for the 2009 Channel 4 series Cast Offs.

== Early life and education ==
Bulmer was born in Kitchener, Ontario, but grew up in Puslinch. She attended Bishops University and studied theatre at the Ryerson Polytechnical Institute's Theatre School. While studying at Ryerson, Bulmer began to lose her vision. She left Ryerson to study voice in the UK, which she hoped would allow her to maintain a connection to theatre even with her declining visual ability. She attended the Central School of Speech and Drama in London, England.

== Career ==
Bulmer performed drag as Alvin Calvin Cumberbund. She also taught theatre at both Ryerson University and George Brown College. Bulmer founded SNIFF (Sensory Narrative in Full Form) Inc., a theatre company focussed on creating works that challenge conventional uses of sensory perception in theatre. In 1996, Bulmer played Barb in Kate Barker's Army of Lovers? at Buddies In Bad Times Theatre.

In 2000, Bulmer's one-act play Smudge premiered with Nightwood Theatre under the direction of Alisa Palmer. The central character in Smudge has retinitis pigmentosa, like Bulmer. The production starred Diane Flacks, Sherry Lee Hunter, and Kate Lynch. Smudge was nominated for the Chalmers Canadian Play Award.

In 2003, Bulmer emceed Smashing Stereotypes Productions' Culture Cauldron II, a cabaret of performances inspired by disability performed at Ryerson University. Bulmer is one of the founders of Invisible Flash, a theatre company which she is currently the artistic director of. She also worked as a part-time literary manager for Graeae Theatre in London.

In 2009, after returning to Canada, Bulmer acted in Michael Rubenfeld and Sarah Stanley's The Book of Judith, a play inspired by quadriplegic activist and artist Judith Snow, at The Theatre Centre in Toronto.

Bulmer produced Cripping the Arts and Cripping the Stage in 2016, with funding from the British Council, Tangled Art and Disability, Ryerson University Disability Studies, and Harbourfront Centre. Cripping the Arts has since become a yearly symposium and, in 2019, featured Crip Shorts, which Bulmer co-produced. For Crip Shorts, Bulmer worked with circus performer Erin Ball to make her performance accessible for the visually impaired.

In 2017, Bulmer acted in Martha Ross's The Story with Common Boots Theatre. In 2019, she worked with Common Boots Theatre again, this time serving as accessibility dramaturge for Natasha Greenblatt and Yolanda Bonnell's The Election. At the 2019 Toronto Fringe, Bulmer co-directed Scadding with Jennifer Brewin.

Bulmer co-created the play May I Take Your Arm with Anna Camilleri, Tristan Whiston, and Katie Yealland. May I Take Your Arm premiered with Red Dress Productions in 2018. Bulmer and Red Dress Productions re-imagined May I Take Your Arm as an online performance for the 2020 Luminato Festival. Bulmer developed the play Blind Woman in Search of a Narrative between 2018 and 2020 during her residency with Bodies in Translation at the University of Guelph.

In April 2022, Bulmer curated the CoMotion Festival, a showcase of Deaf and disabled artists online and at Toronto's Harbourfront Centre. Her play, Perpetual Archaeology, is set to premiere with Crow's Theatre under the direction of Leah Cherniak and starring Bulmer, in June 2023.

== Works ==
=== Plays ===
- Smudge
- May I Take Your Arm - co-created with Anna Camilleri, Tristan Whiston, and Katie Yealland
- Blind Woman in Search of a Narrative
- Perpetual Archaeology

=== Other ===
- Cast Offs — 6-part television series, co-written with Jack Thorne, Tony Roche, Jamie Campbell, and Joel Wilson (2009)

== Personal life ==
Bulmer was diagnosed with retinitis pigmentosa at age 21 and lost functioning vision in 2006 as a result. In 2003, Bulmer moved to London, England but returned to Toronto permanently in October 2017.
