= Leah Cherniak =

Canadian playwright (born 1956)

- Born: August 22, 1956 (age 70)
- Education: University of Toronto
- Notable work: The Attic, the Pearls and Three Fine Girls

Leah Cherniak (born 1956) is a Canadian playwright, actor, and teacher. She is a co-founder of Theatre Columbus (now called Common Boots).

== Early life and education ==
Cherniak graduated from the University of Toronto with a BA in 1979. She later studied at École Jacques Lecoq, where she met Martha Ross.

== Career ==
Cherniak co-founded Theatre Columbus with Martha Ross in 1984. Originally, the company was called The Gargoils. In 2015, Theatre Columbus changed their name to Common Boots Theatre.

=== Teaching ===
Beginning in 1985, Cherniak taught clown at the National Theatre School. In 2001, Cherniak began teaching dance at Ryerson University (now Toronto Metropolitan University) and George Brown College.

=== Directorial credits ===
==== Theatre ====
- Up Against the Wallpaper – Nightwood Theatre (1989)
- The Tell-Tale Heart – Theatre Columbus (1995)
- Froth (1996)
- Three Birds Alighting on a Field – George Brown Theatre (2000)
- Lonely Nights and Other Stories – Theatre Columbus, co-directed with Maggie Huculak (2001)
- Rue Alridge – Tarragon Theatre (2004)
- Edward the "Crazy Man" – Lorraine Kimsa Theatre for Young People (2008)
- 6 Essential Questions – Factory Theatre (2014)
- Clown – Ryerson School of Performance (2018)
- The Ward Cabaret – Harbourfront Centre Theatre (2020), co-directed with David Buchbinder
- Perpetual Archaeology – Crow's Theatre written by and starring Alex Bulmer (June 2023)

==== Film ====
- Things Dead People Say – short film (2020)

=== Acting credits ===
==== Theatre ====
Year	Show	Role	Notes	Ref.
1995	The Attic, The Pearls, and Three Fine Girls	Jelly		
2015	The Dybbuk, Or Between Two Worlds	Frayde		
2018	Animal Farm	Bessie		
2019	Scadding	Ensemble		

== Plays ==
- Until We Part – co-written with Martha Ross
- The Anger in Ernest and Ernestine – co-written with Robert Morgan and Martha Ross
- Still Clowning – co-written with Martha Ross
- The Fragments – co-written with Suvendrini Lena and Trevor Schwellnus
- The Theory of Relatives – co-written with Daniel Brooks, Diane Flacks, Richard Greenblatt, Leslie Lester, and Allan Merovitz
- The Attic, The Pearls, and Three Fine Girls – co-written with Jennifer Brewin, Martha Ross, Ann-Marie MacDonald, and Alisa Palmer
- More Fine Girls – co-written with Brewin, Ross, MacDonald, and Palmer, sequel to The Attic, The Pearls, and Three Fine Girls
- Scadding ' co-created with Jennifer Brewin, Alex Bulmer, Khadijah Roberts-Abdullah, John Gzowski, Maggie Huculak, Anand Rajaram, Jenny Salisbury and Stephon Smith
- The Betrayal – co-written with Oliver Dennis, Maggie Huculak, Robert Morgan, Martha Ross and Michael Simpson

== Awards ==
Year	Award	Category	Work	Results	Notes	Ref.
1987	Dora Mavor Moore Awards – Small Theatre	Best Production	Fertility	Won	with Martha Ross	
1988	Dora Mavor Moore Awards – Small Theatre	Outstanding Direction	The Anger in Ernest and Ernestine	Nominated		
1988	Dora Mavor Moore Awards – Small Theatre	Outstanding New Play	The Anger in Ernest and Ernestine	Nominated		
1989	Dora Mavor Moore Awards – Small Theatre	Outstanding Direction	Paranoia	Nominated		
1990	Dora Mavor Moore Awards – Small Theatre	Outstanding Direction	Dr. Dapertutto	Nominated		
1991	Dora Mavor Moore Awards – Ancillary awards	Pauline McGibbon Award	N/A	Won		
1994	Floyd S. Chalmers Canadian Play Award	General Theatre	The Theory of Relatives	Nominated	with Daniel Brooks, Diane Flacks, Richard Greenblatt, Leslie Lester, Allan Merovitz	
1994	Dora Mavor Moore Awards – Small Theatre	Outstanding New Play	The Theory of Relatives	Nominated	with Daniel Brooks, Diane Flacks, Richard Greenblatt, Leslie Lester, Allan Merovitz	
1995	Dora Mavor Moore Awards – Small Theatre	Outstanding Performance by a Female–Play	The Attic, The Pearls, and Three Fine Girls	Nominated		
1995	Dora Mavor Moore Awards – Small Theatre	Outstanding New Play or Musical	The Attic, The Pearls, and Three Fine Girls	Nominated	with Ann-Marie MacDonald, Martha Ross with Alisa Palmer, Jennifer Brewin	
1996	Floyd S. Chalmers Canadian Play Award	General Theatre	The Attic, The Pearls, and Three Fine Girls	Nominated	with Ann-Marie MacDonald, Martha Ross with Alisa Palmer, Jennifer Brewin	
1996	Dora Mavor Moore Awards – General Theatre	Outstanding Direction	The Diary of Anne Frank	Nominated		
1998	Dora Mavor Moore Awards – General Theatre	Outstanding Direction of a Play	The Betrayal	Nominated		
1999	Floyd S. Chalmers Canadian Play Award	General Theatre	The Betrayal	Won	co-winner with Oliver Dennis, Maggie Huculak, Robert Morgan, Martha Ross and Michael Simpson	
2003	Dora Mavor Moore Awards – General Theatre	Outstanding Direction of a Play	The Miracle Worker	Nominated		
2005	Dora Mavor Moore Awards – Independent Theatre	Outstanding Direction of a Play	The Anger in Ernest and Ernestine	Nominated		
