= The Arab's Mouth =

Play written by Ann-Marie MacDonald

- Original language: English
- Written by: Ann-Marie MacDonald in 1990

Premiere
- Place: Factory Theatre in Toronto

The Arab's Mouth is a 1990 play by Ann-Marie MacDonald which she later revised to create Belle Moral, at which point most of the Arabic references were cut. The title refers to a shape found on a stone by the central character—a circle or zero.

== History ==
The Arab's Mouth was initially staged at the Factory Theatre in Toronto, Canada. The 1990 premiere was directed by Maureen White. MacDonald lightly revised the play for publication, at which point it was staged at Theatre Kingston in Kingston, Ontario. It is now out of print, having been superseded by Belle Moral.
