= The Way the Crow Flies =

Novel by Ann-Marie MacDonald

- First edition cover
- Author: Ann-Marie MacDonald
- Language: English
- Publisher: Knopf Canada
- Publication date: 2003

The Way the Crow Flies is the second novel by Canadian author Ann-Marie MacDonald. It was first published by Knopf Canada in 2003.

The story revolves around a fictionalized version of the death of Lynne Harper, and the subsequent murder trial of Steven Truscott. The novel is set in the early 1960s predominantly at the Royal Canadian Air Force Station Centralia located in a small town near London, Ontario. In the story, the character Ricky Froelich, a Métis foster child, is the fictionalized version of Steven Truscott.

== Plot ==
In 1960s rural Canada, eight-year-old Madeleine McCarthy is a high-spirited, precocious and empathetic girl who has recently moved with her parents and her brother, Mike, to Centralia, Ontario, known collectively by the mostly Caucasian military families living there as "God's Country". Told from the perspective of Madeleine throughout much of the book, which initially starts as a coming-of-age tale, she recounts the sunny optimism of starting at a new school and her new house. Madeleine idolizes her older brother, sees her father as a hero, and quickly befriends classmates Auriel and Lisa. It is, however, gradually revealed that Madeleine is growing up directly through some of Canada's darker history, including anti-Indigenous racism, Cold War secrecy, her father Jack's quiet horror at the facilitation of a suspected Nazi scientist into Canada for research, her mother Mimi's cultural struggle as an Acadian, and a pedophile schoolteacher, Mr. March, who abuses Madeleine and some other female classmates. Madeleine acts out in regards to the molestation by severely injuring a tree, which she later sobs to Jack about, horrified that she hurt another living thing after having debarked the tree and soaped the windows of her school. She is drawn to Colleen, the mysterious daughter of a non-military family across the street, but is dissuaded from befriending her at first. An American family moves in with a young daughter Madeleine's age named Claire McCarroll, whom Madeleine befriends. Mimi befriends Karen Froelich, Colleen's mother.

Claire is discovered murdered and apparently sexually abused, not long after which Ricky Froelich, a Métis boy (and Colleen's brother), is arrested for. Madeleine begins to internalize the increasingly surreal and maddening nature of her community as she struggles to cope with her friend's death, and is deeply bothered by two other girls in her class, misfit Marjorie (a bossy and cold child who exhibits symptoms of a cluster B disorder), and Grace, a disabled girl who struggles with poor hygiene and is often taken advantage of by Marjorie. At one point, Madeleine spots Grace picking up a piece of desiccated dog poop that has hardened and turned white, trying to write with it as though it's a piece of chalk. Grace makes repeated attempts at communication but is generally ignored. Disillusioned by her own family and still traumatized by both Claire's murder and the abuse at the hands of Mr. March, Madeleine becomes close friends with Colleen and the girls become blood sisters. Jack becomes more anxious and distant as he reflects upon his friend Simon, a Jewish Holocaust survivor, and upon his own loss of innocence. Meanwhile, Colleen dreads the Compulsory sterilization in Canada targeting Indigenous and disabled Canadians, which takes place during periods of forced institutionalization and renders them unable to ever have biological children. Short intermissions reveal Indigenous Canadians facing abuse, ethnic cleansing and forced sterilization in the Canadian Indian residential school system and in hospitals.

The book later explores Madeleine's life as she grows older. Jack and Mimi remain married, but they grow apart; Jack spends much of his free time watching television, while Mimi buries herself in volunteer work. Mimi drifts apart from Madeleine when her daughter reveals that she's a lesbian. As Madeleine seeks therapy for her past, which does little to help her, she does begin to come to terms with her lesbian sexuality and her trauma, accepting herself as a person; she establishes a career, and becomes gradually estranged from the rest of her family. She reunites with Colleen, who is older and has faced her own trauma and lives with exonerated Ricky, isolated and reserved but nonetheless happy to reunite with her old friend. The book reveals in the end that Claire's killer was not Ricky at all, but actually Marjorie, who bullied Claire after school, lured her to an isolated area, removed her underwear and murdered her, while coercing Grace into helping her (Grace's repeated attempts to communicate as a child, including writing with the desiccated dog poop on the sidewalk, were an attempt to report the crime to Madeleine without getting noticed by Marjorie). Claire's murder remains officially unsolved. When Madeleine attempts to telephone Marjorie, who has a family and works as a nurse, Marjorie hangs up on her.

== Reception ==
The Way the Crow Flies was nominated for the 2003 Scotiabank Giller Prize and for the 2004 Lambda Literary Awards. The Book of the Month club selected it for distribution.

The book was well-reviewed. In The Guardian, Aida Edemariam wrote that "the novel is a thriller, too, as tightly wrought and formal as a Hitchcock storyboard, all the way to the sudden vertiginous surprise at the end". Edemariam had criticisms: "MacDonald can be heavy-handed with the historical context, especially in the clunky first chapter". Edemariam concluded that "The Way the Crow Flies is, in the end, moving and compulsively readable". Writing for the Canadian magazine Quill & Quire, Bronwyn Drainie said that "for the most part, this is an engrossing and ingeniously plotted portrait of a 'perfect' 1960s Canadian family coming to terms with all its imperfections". Drainie wrote that, while "the first three-quarters of The Way the Crow Flies are solid and captivating, the final quarter [is] a somewhat disappointing and navel-gazing denouement".
