= Waawaate Fobister =

Canadian actor

- Citizenship: Canada
- Education: Theatre Arts Performance, Humber College, 2005
- Occupations: Actor, dancer, playwright
- Notable work: Agokwe
- Awards: Dora Mavor Moore Award

Waawaate Fobister is an Anishinaabe and Canadian actor, dancer, playwright, choreographer, instructor, producer and storyteller, best known for their semi-autobiographical one-man play, Agokwe.

== Early life ==
Fobister grew up on the Grassy Narrows First Nation reserve, north of Kenora, Ontario. As a child, Fobister's father and grandfather introduced them to the indigenous oral storytelling tradition; a path that Fobister would choose for themself as well. At the age of eighteen, Fobister came out as gay or two-spirited. Growing up on the reservation, they encountered homophobia and abuse; experiences which they channel into their work. Fobister got their spirit name, Waawaate, which means Northern Lights, as they began to explore their Native spirituality. As Fobister recalls, they met with a medicine woman who could give spirit names. After presenting the woman with tobacco, she instructed them to come back in a few weeks and that after prayer, they would find a spirit name. Upon Fobister's return, the woman told them she had found their spirit name and said, "...when I saw it, I saw...dark sky, and I seen lights and I seen dancing", referencing the Northern Lights which, in Anishinaabe culture represent spirits dancing.

Fobister earned a degree in Theatre Arts Performance as well as the Distinguished Performance Award from Humber College in 2005. They also studied theater and dance at Banff Centre for the Arts, School of Toronto Dance Theatre, Centre for Indigenous Theatre, and Kahawi Dance Theatre.

== Career ==
Fobister performed their first play, Savage, at public and private schools throughout Ontario. Savage tells the story of a young gay boy and his mentor in a small town. Shortly after graduating from Humber College, Fobister wrote Agokwe (a variation of agokwa, the Anishinaabe word which loosely translates to "man-woman" but in modern usage is better understood as "two-spirited"), a story of unrequited love between two gay teenage boys. The play explores themes of love, sexuality, homophobia, isolation, and Native cultural traditions. Agokwe premiered at Toronto's Buddies in Bad Times theater on September 23, 2008. The play went on to win six Dora Mavor Moore Awards, including Outstanding New Play, in 2009. Four years later, Fobister's second play, Medicine Boy premiered at the Scotiabank Studio Theatre, August 9–18, 2012. Medicine Boy tells stories of inter-generational trauma within First Nations families stemming from colonization, residential schools, and industrial waste poisoning the land. In 2019, Fobister introduced Omaagomaan (loosely translated as "someone biting very hard"), a dance that draws attention to the mercury poisoning and subsequent health problems within their community in Grassy Narrows.

In addition to stage performance, Fobister has appeared in the films Famous (post-production) and The Time Traveler (2009) and was playwright in residence for the 2019–2020 season at Native Earth Performing Arts in Toronto and at Magnus Theatre in Thunder Bay. In 2021, they were a panelist on "Dance Ogichidas" at The Bridge: A Festival of Ideas at the Royal Manitoba Theatre Centre, Curator of Indigenous Content at the 2021 Kick & Push Festival, and named the coordinator of the new council for LGBTQ2S indigenous people in Grand Council of Treaty 3 territory. In May 2021, Fobister presented their short play Ode to RED Auntie at the Tiny Plays, Big Ideas digital event for the Royal Manitoba Theatre Centre. As of 2021, Fobister teaches at the Manitoba Theatre for Young People.

== Awards, grants, and nominations ==
=== Awards ===
- 2005 Humber College Distinguished Performance Award
- 2009 Dora Mavor Moore Award, Outstanding New Play, Agokwe
- 2009 Dora Mavor Moore Award, Outstanding Performance in a Principal Role - Play, Agokwe
- 2014 Bonham Centre Youth Award from The Mark S. Bonham Centre for Sexual Diversity Studies at the University of Toronto for his contributions to the advancement and education of issues around sexual identification.

=== Grants ===
- [Year] National Aboriginal Achievement Foundation
- [Year] Ontario Arts Council
- [Year] Canada Council for the Arts

=== Nominations ===
- [Year] Ontario Premiers' Award
- [Year] K.M. Hunter Award
- [Year] Sterling Award
