= Belle Moral =

First edition (publ. Playwrights Canada Press)

Belle Moral is a play by Ann-Marie MacDonald which premiered at the Shaw Festival in 2005.

A substantial reworking of MacDonald's earlier play, The Arab's Mouth, Belle Moral is a gothic comedy set in Scotland in 1899. Following her father's death, Pearl MacIsaac, a young woman who is an amateur scientist, struggles to discover the secret about her family's past which her father had kept hidden with the help of the family doctor. The play embraces a complex range of turn-of-the-century thought, especially including Charles Darwin's theory of evolution, contemporary medical beliefs and the concept of eugenics.

Belle Moral was published in 2005 by Playwrights Canada Press.
