= Vincent de Tourdonnet =

Canadian musical theatre writer

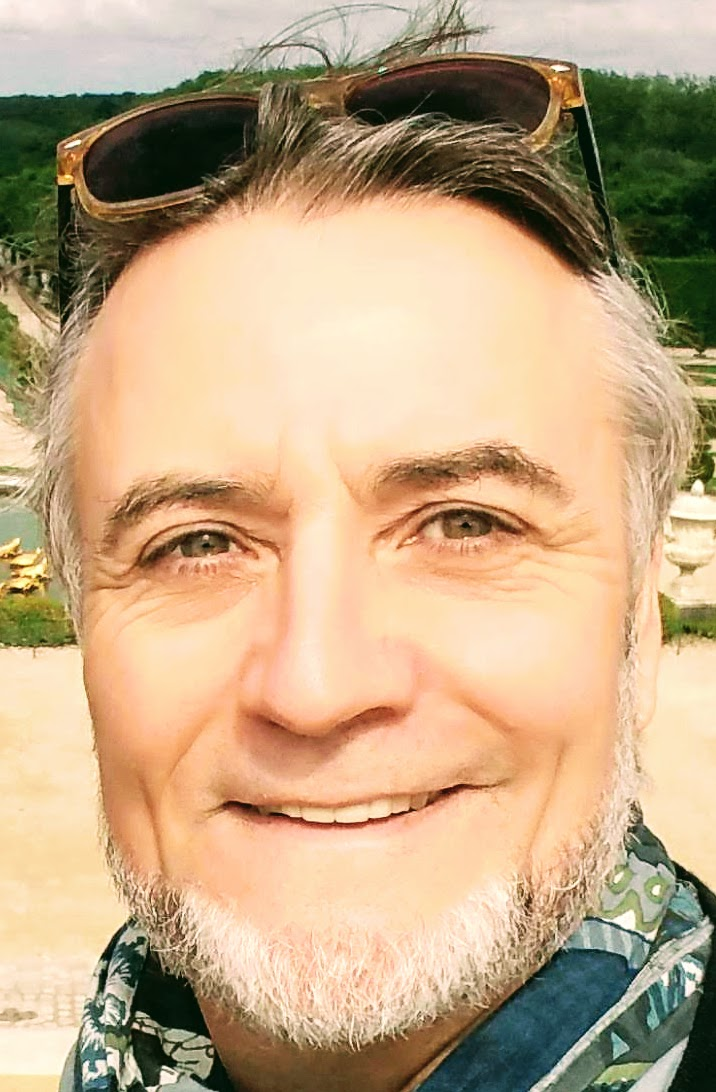
Vincent de Tourdonnet in 2019

Vincent de Tourdonnet is a Canadian musical theatre writer. He is known for writing large-scale historical musicals, as well as intimate, cabaret-style musicals. He also serves as stage director.

== Biography ==
De Tourdonnet’s epic musical Pélagie, co-written with Allen Cole, premiered at CanStage in Toronto and The National Arts Centre in Ottawa, and was broadcast on CBC radio. De Tourdonnet directed an Eastern Canada touring production of Pélagie, produced by Two Planks and a Passion with a bilingual cast alternating performances in French and English. Starring Québec chanteuse Marie Denise Pelletier, and Canadian actor Rejean Cournoyer, it was translated by Antonine Maillet, author of the Prix Goncourt-winning novel Pélagie-la-charrette, on which the musical is based.

His first production of Snappy Tales, Short Satirical Musicals, (book, lyrics & direction) at the Factory Theatre in Toronto, was nominated for 7 Dora Mavor Moore Awards.

De Tourdonnet’s largest musical to date was the Joan of Arc musical, Jeanne. Initially, he and composer Peter Sipos developed the work at the BMI Lehman Engel Musical Theater Workshop in New York. It premiered to strong critical acclaim in 1995 in Montreal at the Saidye Bronfman Theatre, (co-directed by de Tourdonnet) and then went on to large-scale, $4.5 million production at the Place des Arts and La Capitole in Quebec City in 1997, and was seen by over 100,000 people. It was directed by Martin Charnin, and the French translation was created by Antonine Maillet.

Book & lyrics for other shows go back to 1985, including Strange Medicine and The Good Person for the Caravan Farm Theatre in B.C., and adaptations of The Threepenny Opera with APA in Montreal and for Touchstone Theatre in Vancouver.

De Tourdonnet's current historical project is The Musical McCoy, adapted from Andrew Moodie's award-winning hit play The Real McCoy, based on the life of Elijah McCoy, the 19th-century Canadian-born black inventor who helped revolutionize the steam engine.

While living in New York City, de Tourdonnet taught musical theatre writing at Long Island University. He is now based in Prince Edward County, Ontario with his wife, Beth Easton.

De Tourdonnet has long advocated for cycling and other forms of active transportation, and has worked to help create bike paths, recently in Prince Edward County and previously in Toronto with Cycle Toronto. He has contributed articles to Momentum Magazine and wrote a chapter on the recumbent bicycle for the book On Bicycles: 50 Ways the New Bike Culture Can Change Your Life, He served for years of the board of Transportation Options. At the beginning of 2024, Vincent took on a role as Transit Coordinator with the municipality of Prince Edward County.
