= Diane Flacks =

Canadian comedic actress, screenwriter and playwright

- Born: Lachine, Quebec, Canada
- Occupations: Writer, actor
- Children: 2
- Website: www.dianeflacks.com

Diane Flacks is a Canadian comedic actress, screenwriter and playwright.

== Early life and education ==
Flacks was raised in the Jewish faith. Her early education took place in Jewish parochial schools. Flacks studied drama at Leah Posluns Institute in Toronto. At twenty seven years old, she came out as a lesbian.

== Career ==
Flacks began her acting career as a child, in a touring production of Cinderella where she played both the wicked stepmother and fairy godmother. As an adult, she has worked in Canadian and U.S. television, radio, news, and film before becoming an independent performance artist, playwright, and writer.

=== Theater ===
It appears that Flacks started her official career in media with theatre. Flacks' early works include three one-woman stage shows that she wrote and performed herself: Myth Me (1991), By a Thread (1997), and Random Acts (1997). She co-created the Chalmers Canadian Play Award-nominated Theory of Relatives with Daniel Brooks, Leah Cherniak, Richard Greenblatt, Leslie Lester, and Allan Merovit. She wrote Gravity Calling (1995) directed by Richard Greenblatt, co-wrote Sibs (2000) with Richard Greenblatt, and wrote Waiting Room (2015) directed by Richard Greenblatt. In 2000, Flacks performed in Smudge, a play in one act written by Alex Bulmer and directed by Alisa Palmer.

In 2009, Flacks wrote and performed in the play based on her book Bear With Me, directed by Kelly Thornton.

In 2012, Flacks wrote the award-winning play Luba, Simply Luba for Ukrainian Canadian comedian Luba Goy. In 2017, she wrote and performed in Unholy (2017).

Flacks has regularly performed at the Tarragon Theatre and the collective feminist Nightwood Theatre in Toronto. She served twice on the Nightwood Theatre board of directors.

=== Film ===
Flacks' best known performance is in the leading role of the lesbian film Portrait of a Serial Monogamist (2015). Prior to this, Flacks had performed as the main character's guardian angel in the sex comedy Too Much Sex (2000).

=== Television ===
In the 1990s Flacks wrote for The Kids in the Hall and was twice nominated for an Emmy for her work. Flacks began acting on television in 2001 in the comedy series The Broad Side. She has co-written and starred in numerous television series since then, including P.R., Behind the Scenes and Listen Missy. In 2016, Flacks wrote six episodes for the Baroness Von Sketch Show. She has also acted in episodes of Walter Ego and Moose TV.

=== Writing ===
In 2005, MacMillan Stewart published Flacks' first book Bear With Me, about Flacks' personal experience with pregnancy and new motherhood. In 2007, Flacks became a featured columnist with the Toronto Star.

=== Radio ===
Flacks is a regular contributor for the CBC Radio show Definitely Not the Opera. For almost eight years she has also worked as a CBC Radio National Parenting columnist.

== Recurring themes ==
In her own works, Flacks explores themes of Jewish identity, the relationship between women and religion, lesbian relationships, pregnancy, serious medical issues, and motherhood.

== Awards and honours ==
- 1994–1995 Emmy nomination for Outstanding Individual Achievement in Writing in a Variety or Music Program for the television show The Kids in the Hall
- 2014 Kobzar Literary Award in collaboration with Andrey Tarasiuk and Luba Goy for the play Luba, Simply Luba

== Personal life ==
Flacks was married to Janis Purdy and is now divorced. They have two children. Her older son received a Jewish education.
