= Fall on Your Knees =

Novel by Ann-Marie MacDonald

- First edition cover
- Author: Ann-Marie MacDonald
- Language: English
- Set in: Cape Breton Island, Nova Scotia, Canada; New York City
- Publisher: Knopf Canada, Simon & Schuster
- Publication date: 1996
- Publication place: Canada
- Pages: 566 (1st edition)
- Awards: Commonwealth Writers Prize
- ISBN: 9780394281599
- OCLC: 35035930
- Website: Publisher's website

Fall on Your Knees is a 1996 novel by Canadian playwright, actor and novelist Ann-Marie MacDonald. The novel takes place in the late 19th and early 20th centuries and chronicles four generations of the complex Piper Family. It is a story of "inescapable family bonds, terrible secrets, and of miracles". Beginning in Cape Breton Island, Nova Scotia through the battlefields of World War I and ending in New York City, the troubled Piper sisters depend on one another for survival.

The book was featured by Oprah's Book Club in 2002. As of 2014, it has been published in 23 territories and translated into 19 languages.

== Plot summary ==
At the start of the 20th century, James Piper sets out across Cape Breton Island to find a place to live. Working as a piano tuner, he meets and eventually elopes with 13-year-old Materia Mahmoud, much to the anger of her wealthy, traditional Lebanese parents. Materia gives birth to their first daughter, Kathleen, and James subsequently becomes disgusted with his wife, realizing that he actually married "a child." Materia regrets marrying James and does not take to her newborn child. James, however, ignores and neglects Materia while spoiling and smothering Kathleen. Materia is taken in by the neighbor Mrs. Luvovitz, who teaches her to sew and cook. She grows to hate James and their daughter Kathleen.

Materia senses danger in James' obsession with their daughter and sees it as her duty to keep him distracted. James eventually impregnates Materia; she gives birth to three girls, Mercedes, Frances and Lily, but Lily dies a crib death shortly after. As Kathleen grows older, she is perceived by her schoolmates as snobby, and they turn against her. Her father James is her only friend, and when he travels to war, Kathleen is crushed.

Kathleen befriends her younger sisters, and James returns from war a shadow of his former self, but still feels an attraction to his eldest daughter. He sends her to New York City to train with a voice instructor and to fulfill her dream of becoming an opera singer. During her absence, James receives a letter from an "Anonymous Well-Wisher" suggesting that Kathleen may have gotten into trouble in New York. He brings her home and realizes she is pregnant. Kathleen spends her pregnancy hidden in her family home, and dies giving birth to twins, a boy and a girl. Frances believes the babies must be baptized, and attempts to do so in the creek behind the house the night of their birth. James catches her, and believes she is trying to drown them. He drags her away and the male twin, named Ambrose by Frances, is accidentally left to drown in the creek. The female twin, Lily, contracts polio from the contaminated creek, but survives. Mercedes, Frances and Lily are all raised to believe Materia is Lily's mother. Materia dies and the remaining Piper sisters come to depend on one another for survival.

Frances, beaten and all-but-disowned by her father, is eventually expelled from school, despite Mercedes' best efforts to keep her in check. Frances finds solace in her dolls, matinee movies, her late mother's old hope chest, and her younger sister Lily. Frances eventually runs away and ends up in her Lebanese uncle's pub as entertainment and a pint-sized whore. She discovers her long-lost grandfather's house, and then becomes obsessed with his African maid, Teresa. She stalks and seduces Teresa's brother, Leo, and becomes impregnated by him. She dreams of becoming a mother to a black child, but her son, Aloysius, is pronounced dead at birth and she becomes depressed. After this trauma, Frances and her father slowly reconcile and she even becomes something akin to a confessor for him before he dies years later.

Lily, crippled by the polio she contracted, wears a leather brace. She loves Frances the most, believing everything she tells her, and so believes Ambrose is her guardian angel, often wishing for him to protect Frances after she left the house.

Mercedes spends her time praying, taking care of the family and studying. She flirts with the idea of a romance with the son of Mrs. Luvovitz, but hesitates because his Jewish ancestry conflicts with her growing religious devotion. James, who makes moonshine as his primary income, suffers a stroke. Consequently, Mercedes is consumed by her role as caretaker, becoming controlling as she gives up on any life outside of this role. This culminates in her deception involving Frances' illegitimate mixed-race child: who was in fact given up for adoption by his disapproving aunt. As Frances and their father grow closer in his old age, Mercedes resents their bond, feeling snubbed after the sacrifices she has made.

Kathleen's diary and old dress are sent home by her caretaker in New York, and after Frances reads it, sends it with Lily to New York, to find Kathleen's lover. Lily reads the diary, discovering Kathleen's vocal lessons, her instructor she calls the Kaiser, and her illicit love affair with the female black piano accompanist, Rose Lacroix. Both women fell madly in love, going to jazz bars with Rose dressed as a man. James barges into Kathleen's apartment one day to find her in bed with Rose (whom he mistakes for a man). A furious attack on Rose leads to James' jealous rape of Kathleen, as his sexual desire for her finally overcomes him. This reveals Lily's true father. James eventually confesses everything to Frances, before dying in his reading chair, peacefully. Frances finally reveals the family's darkest secrets to her sister Mercedes, who is in denial. Frances dies as an elderly woman with the help of Mercedes, without ever knowing the actual fate of her child.

In New York, Lily makes her way to Rose's apartment. The two form a friendship and live together for many years, eventually visited by a young black man called Anthony, bearing a gift from Mercedes Piper. He delivers a drawing of a family tree, made by Mercedes, finally revealing all the incest, illegitimate children, crib deaths and affairs that make up the Piper family. Anthony is revealed to be Frances' long-lost son Aloysius, and Lily sits him down to tell him about his mother.

== Awards and honors ==
For Fall on Your Knees, MacDonald won the 1997 Commonwealth Writers Prize for Best First Book.

Also in 1997, the book won the Canadian Authors Association Award for Fiction.

It won the Canadian Booksellers Association's Libris Award (date of award unknown).

The novel was shortlisted for the Giller Prize in 1996.

It was selected for Oprah's Book Club in 2002 and was chosen for the Amnesty International Book Club for July/August 2014.

== Adaptations ==
Nimble Productions purchased the rights to the work for a limited-series TV program in 2014.

Alisa Palmer and Hannah Moscovitch adapted Fall on Your Knees for the stage. This adaptation premiered in Toronto in January 2023 as a National Arts Centre, Vita Brevis Arts, Canadian Stage, Neptune Theatre, and Grand Theatre joint production. It is set to tour after the Toronto run.
