= Adult Onset =

2014 novel by Ann-Marie MacDonald

- First edition cover
- Author: Ann-Marie MacDonald
- Language: English
- Genre: Literary realism; Autobiographical; Lesbian
- Set in: Toronto, Ontario, Canada
- Publisher: Alfred A. Knopf Canada
- Publication date: 2014
- Publication place: Canada
- Pages: 384 (1st edition)
- ISBN: 9780345808271
- OCLC: 875729424
- Dewey Decimal: C813/.54
- LC Class: PR9199.3.M2985
- Website: annmariemacdonald.com/works/novels/adult-onset/

Adult Onset is a 2014 novel by Canadian writer Ann-Marie MacDonald. Set in The Annex neighbourhood of Toronto, the story centers on one week in the life of a successful writer of young adult fiction, Mary Rose MacKinnon, who finds herself taking care of her two young children while her wife is out of town directing a play. The novel starts with a light tone in describing Mary Rose's new-found solo daily domesticity with her son and daughter. But through a series of flashbacks, "Mister" or "MR" as Mary Rose is known to family and friends, is forced to confront her own repressed abuse as a child. At the center of the family drama is her mother, Dolly, an immigrant child-wife in postwar Canada.

The novel has been translated into five non-English languages and was published in a Braille edition. It was a finalist for the 2014 Lambda Literary Award in the category of Lesbian Fiction.

== Synopsis ==
The story opens on a Monday in early April with 48-year-old successful young adult novelist Mary Rose MacKinnon having received an email from her father, who had only the day before had an email service installed on his computer. The subject line is "some things really do get better …" which catches MR's attention amid the many unopened messages in her inbox. The content of the note was a compliment from her father regarding Mary Rose and her wife Hilary's video contribution to the It Gets Better Project, in support of LGBTQ youth. In the present, MR's parents are supportive of her lesbianism but that was not always the case. When Mary Rose came out to her mother decades earlier, Dolly's response was that she wished Mary Rose had cancer instead. Mary Rose struggles to find the right words to answer her father's email, while also attending to her daily challenges as the temporarily single mother of a five-year-old son and a feisty two-year-old daughter.

Outwardly, MR appears to have a normal, urban lifestyle as a modern lesbian mother. But lurking underneath is a rage that begins to surface as MR experiences the recurrence of a chronic arm pain that began when she was a child. The adult Mary Rose is not sure whether her pain is real or remembered, and she wonders why her parents did not take her unicameral bone cysts more seriously during her youth. Through a series of flashbacks and a stream-of-consciousness narrative style, mixed with dry humour and witty sarcasm, MR tries to piece together her fractured childhood memories as the third surviving child of Duncan and Dolly MacKinnon. MR's birth was sandwiched between the stillbirth of "The Other Mary Rose" and followed by the death in infancy of "Alexander-Who-Died". MR's childhood was spent with a mother who suffered from severe post-partum depression. MR has recurring memories of being dangled over the balcony of the family's apartment in Germany by her older sister Maureen, which Maureen denies vigorously. As she confronts her blurred memories and the unresolved traumas of her childhood over the course of the week, combined with the frustrations of child rearing, MR edges closer to the brink of causing harm to her own children. By the Sunday of that week, Mary Rose is finally able to answer her father's email.

Subplots involve the differing memories of the same events by siblings and parents, the challenges of long-distance relationships, and the progression of present-day Dolly's dementia.

== Development ==
In an interview where she discussed the 10 years between the publication of her previous novel and Adult Onset and the issue of writer's block, MacDonald stated "My blocks were more that I was writing about somebody who was processing personal shadows, demons from the past, in order not to pass them on to her child, while also trying to care for her elderly parents as best she can. If you haven't processed your own past and your own childhood, if there is any kind of unprocessed demon hanging around, there's nothing like a toddler in your life to bring it springing out."

Adult Onset had its origins as part of a collection of short stories, none of which have been published. The 65-page story "Hello Stranger" also featured the character of Mary Rose MacKinnon; MacDonald described it as "a donor story", which she harvested and "used its organs for Adult Onset".

In a departure from her two previous novels, which were historically-based fiction that required extensive research, Adult Onset was written "in the moments between the hours of 8:30 a.m. and 3 p.m. when both of MacDonald's children were safely in the hands of Ontario's educational system". Her youngest child was five years old when MacDonald started writing the book. She said that she didn't have time to do as much research as she did with her earlier works, so instead "I have to work with what I have. I have to be able to write this book from what's already inside of me." MacDonald said further "I really did use my own psyche, emotional, experiential tissues. I donated it all because that's what I had to work with."

There are many similarities between MacDonald's real life and that of main character Mary Rose MacKinnon. Both were born in West Germany, with a father in the Canadian military and a Lebanese mother. Both are lesbian mothers with a wife who is a playwright and theatre director, and with two children and a dog. Both are writers, although the character of Mary Rose is an author of young adult fiction, while MacDonald's writings tackle more adult subject matter. Both experienced rejection by their parents after revealing their lesbianism. Both have taken over the domestic and child-rearing responsibilities within the family, due to their partner working out of town, which has resulted in both putting their writing careers on pause. Both experienced childhood traumas that resurface and demand attention and analysis. MacDonald told a reviewer that Adult Onset "was a novel that demanded to be written, a catharsis of sorts in a coming to terms with her own past".

Because so much of the story is drawn from MacDonald's real life, including her painful childhood memories, she responded to a question of self-censorship with "At a certain point, when I knew I'd be working with material that would be recognizable to people who are close to me, my loved ones, my parents who are so elderly now…I did talk to my parents. I told them what I was working on and said 'You may recognize some things. I am drawing on darker aspects of our history together, drawing on my own life to create a universal story that hopefully other people will recognize themselves in. In order to do that, I need to draw on some very personal stuff because that's my job.' My father responded by saying, 'And you do your job so well.' That said, this book is still not the easiest thing in the world for him."

MacDonald has said she considers Adult Onset to the final installment in a trilogy that reflects her life "in a parallel world".

== Publication history ==
- The novel was originally published in 2014 by Alfred A. Knopf Canada, in both print and E-book versions.
- The first U.S. edition was published in 2015 by Tin House Books.
- It was published in the U.K. by Sceptre, also in 2015.
- An unabridged audiobook read by MacDonald was released in 2015 by Random House Audio.
- The novel has been translated into French as L'air Adulte (2015), Italian as L'età Adulta (2015), Spanish as Un Mal Secreto (2017), Dutch as In Haar Lichaam Besloten (2015), and Polish as Mary Rose Postanawia Żyć (2015).
- A Braille edition in four volumes was published in 2015 by CNIB.

== Critical reception ==
Reviews of the novel at the time of publication were generally positive.

The New York Times published two reviews. Novelist Maggie Pouncey described the work in a "Sunday Book Review" as MacDonald's "big, troubling, brave new novel", and concludes with "Adult Onset puts MacDonald's readers in the interesting and uncomfortable position of liking someone who is occasionally awful. Then again, who can't relate to that?" In a shorter review written a week earlier, reviewer Carmela Ciuraru said "This material might have gone too far in the direction of either soap opera or sitcom, but Ms. MacDonald strikes just the right tone as she exposes the brutal undercurrents of domestic life."

A review by Mark Medley in The Globe and Mail said it is "a novel about difficulties, especially those between parents and their children…. It is not a horror novel, but I'm a 33-year-old man with no kids, and Adult Onset scared the hell out of me."

Maclean's Brian Bethune described the book as "an intricate, gripping novel that is also a master class in turning the personal into the universal through art".

Although mostly positive about the book, Emily Donaldson's review in The Toronto Star said that the work is "stymied" by "its unnecessarily high thread count" because too much of the book is spent "on the dreck and dross of parenting … and on establishing Mary Rose's urban liberal bona fides".

A review by Amity Gaige for The Guardian described the novel as "a powerful psychological gyre" and that the book's tone "is frank and acidly funny … and the writing is utterly engaging and complex".

Toronto Sun reviewer Nancy Schiefer described the novel as "a tour de force in emotional resonance, incisive observation and good story telling" and concludes with "the novel is superb, a fine blending of fact and fiction, of remembered incident and forgotten history, a wonderfully written treatise on the power of the past to impinge on the present".

A review by Heather Seggel in Gay & Lesbian Review Worldwide concludes that the book "is a contemporary slice of life that speaks to how far we've come – as women, as lesbians, as parents – while acknowledging how often we impede our own progress".

== Accolades ==
- Adult Onset was a finalist for the 2015 Canadian Authors Association Literary Award in the Fiction category.
- It was a finalist for the 27th annual Lambda Literary Award in the Lesbian Fiction category.
- The book appeared on Maclean's Bestsellers list for 13 weeks, reaching No. 1 during its second week on the chart.
