= Alisa Palmer =

Canadian playwright and theatre director

- Born: New Brunswick, Canada
- Education: McGill University
- Occupations: Playwright, theatre director
- Spouse: Ann-Marie MacDonald
- Writing career
- Subject: Theatre

Alisa Palmer is a Canadian theatre director and playwright. She was the artistic director of Nightwood Theatre from 1993 to 2001. Palmer served as the artistic director of the English section of the National Theatre School of Canada for eleven years, departing the school in 2024.

== Early life ==
Born and raised in New Brunswick, Canada, Alisa Palmer completed a degree in history at McGill University. Her theatre education was based in Montreal and included training with Philippe Gaulier of L'École Internationale de Théâtre Jacques Lecoq (Bouffon and Masque Neutre), Cirque du Soleil (acrobatics), L'École de Mime Corporel de Montréal under Jean Asselin as well as periods of study with Brazilian director Augusto Boal.

== Career ==
Palmer's first interaction with Toronto-based Nightwood Theatre was at the 1987 Groundswell Festival, where she performed with the improv group, Hysterical Women. Following that festival, Palmer directed two shows before joining Nightwood's leadership team. In 1993, Palmer and Diane Roberts were appointed co-artistic directors of Nightwood Theatre, succeeding Kate Lushington. In 1995, Palmer was appointed the sole artistic director of the company. Palmer's leadership at Nightwood was instrumental in confirming the company's move away from a collective to a "legitimate" theatre company.

In 1995, Palmer directed the play The Attic, The Pearls, and Three Fine Girls, which she co-created with Ann-Marie MacDonald, Leah Cherniak, Jennifer Brewin, and Martha Ross. The play was performed by Theatre Columbus, a clown-inspired company created by Leah Cherniak and Martha Ross, and co-starred MacDonald, Cherniak, and Ross. The Attic was nominated for several Dora Mavor Moore awards in the Small Theatre division, including for Outstanding New Play or Musical and for Outstanding Direction. In 2011, Palmer and all of the original cast members except Cherniak, staged a sequel to The Attic called More Fine Girls. More Fine Girls was performed at Tarragon Theatre.

While working at Nightwood, Palmer directed such shows as Bridget McFarthing's Blatantly Sexual (1993), Lisa Walter's Difference of Latitude (1994), Sabina Fella's Fed by Fairies (1996), Diane Flacks's Random Acts (1997), a workshop production of Caryl Churchill's The Skirker (1998), and Alex Bulmer's Smudge (2000). Palmer also acted and wrote while with Nightwood. Palmer's play Wearing the Bone was performed by Nightwood Theatre as part of the 1993–1994 season. In 1996, Palmer acted in Baņuta Rubess's Froth: a spectacle about shopping & hysteria. Palmer co-wrote the book for the musical Anything That Moves with Ann-Marie MacDonald; Anything That Moves premiered at Nightwood under Palmer's direction as part of the 1999–2000 season. Palmer left Nightwood in 2001.

Palmer has directed with the Shaw Festival for eight seasons from 2005 to 2012. At the Shaw Festival, Palmer directed several shows including Ann-Marie MacDonald's Belle Moral: A Natural History (2005), Stephen Sondheim's Sunday in the Park with George (2009), Clare Boothe Luce's The Women (2010), and Githa Sowerby's A Man and Some Women (2012).

In 2007, Palmer directed Caryl Churchill's Top Girls for Soulpepper Theatre. She won a Dora Mavor Moore Award for Outstanding Direction of a Play for her direction of Top Girls. Palmer later directed Marsha Norman's 'night, Mother for Soulpepper in 2008.

Palmer was a resident director of Mirvish Productions' world premiere of The Lord of the Rings in Toronto. In 2016, Palmer directed Nick Green's Body Politic for Buddies in Bad Times. Palmer is also the founder of Vita Brevis, a theatre company involved in the creation and promotion of new works.

Palmer made her Stratford Festival debut in 2014, directing Noël Coward's Hay Fever. Palmer was scheduled to direct Hamlet-911, a modern adaptation of Hamlet written by MacDonald, as part of the 2020 Stratford Festival, but was postponed due to COVID-19. Palmer's production of Hamlet-911 was moved to Stratford's 2022 season.

Palmer and Hannah Moscovitch co-adapted Ann-Marie MacDonald's novel, Fall on Your Knees for the stage. The National Arts Centre premiered the show, under Palmer's direction, in 2023.

=== National Theatre School ===
Palmer first taught at the National Theatre School of Canada (NTS) at the age of 23. At the time, Palmer worked primarily with francophone students. In 2007, Palmer directed Edward Bond's Restoration at the NTS. Palmer has been the artistic director of the English section of the National Theatre School since 2013. Palmer succeeded former director Sherry Bie.

== Plays ==
- Wearing the Bone
- Anything That Moves (musical) — Co-written by Ann-Marie MacDonald (lyrics and book), Alisa Palmer (book), and Allen Cole (music)
- A Play About the Mothers of the Plaza del Mayo
- The Attic, The Pearls, and Three Fine Girls — Co-written by Ann-Marie MacDonald, Leah Cherniak, Jennifer Brewin, Martha Ross, and Alisa Palmer
- More Fine Girls — Co-written by Ann-Marie MacDonald, Leah Cherniak, Jennifer Brewin, Martha Ross, and Alisa Palmer
- Body Politic
- Fall on Your Knees — Co-written with Hannah Moscovitch, adapted from Ann-Marie MacDonald

== Personal life ==
Palmer met Canadian writer Ann-Marie MacDonald at the 1987 Groundswell Festival. Palmer and MacDonald married in July 2003 following the legalization of same sex marriage in Ontario. The two adopted a baby girl later that year. Palmer and MacDonald have two daughters.

== Awards ==
Year	Award	Category	Work	Result	Notes	Ref.
1994	Chalmers Canadian Play Award	General Theatre	A Play About the Mothers of the Plaza del Mayo	Won		
1995	Dora Mavor Moore Awards (Small Theatre)	Outstanding New Play or Musical	The Attic, The Pearls, And Three Fine Girls	Nominated	with Ann-Marie MacDonald and Theatre Columbus	
1995	Dora Mavor Moore Awards (Small Theatre)	Outstanding Direction	The Attic, The Pearls, And Three Fine Girls	Nominated		
1998	Dora Mavor Moore Awards (General)	Outstanding Direction of a Play	Quartet	Nominated		
2000	Dora Mavor Moore Awards (General)	Outstanding New Musical	Anything That Moves	Won	With Ann-Marie MacDonald and Allen Cole	
2002	Dora Mavor Moore Awards (General)	Outstanding Direction of a Musical		Won		
2004	Siminovitch Prize	Director	n/a	Nominated		
2008	Dora Mavor Moore Awards (General)	Outstanding Direction of a Play	Top Girls	Won		
