= Amsterdam Bridge =

Bridge in Toronto, Canada

Coordinates: 43.638305°N 79.384316°W

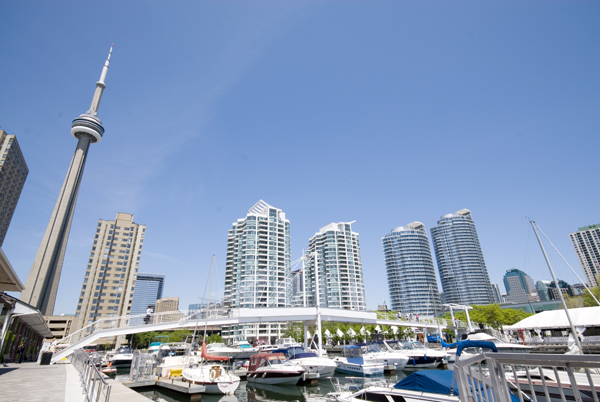
- Carries: Pedestrians (not wheelchair accessible)
- Crosses: Simcoe Street Slip
- Locale: Toronto
- Maintained by: Toronto Transportation Services

Characteristics
- Design: Cable stayed bridge
- Material: Steel
- No. of spans: 1

History
- Opened: 1978

Location
- Interactive map of Amsterdam Bridge

Amsterdam Bridge is a bridge on the waterfront in Toronto, Ontario, Canada. The steel structure is a cable footbridge that crosses over the Simcoe Street Slip from York Quay to Rees Street Slip.

Below the bridge is a docking facility for boats.

The bridge closed in early 2021 due to safety concerns. The bridge was renovated and reopened in late May 2026.

== Name ==
The Amsterdam Bridge commemorates the twinning of Toronto and Amsterdam, and was gifted to Toronto by the Mayor of Amsterdam in 1974. Similarly, a bridge that crosses the Amstel river in Amsterdam was renamed Torontobrug. The Torontobrug is a bascule bridge built in 1970 and carries pedestrian and vehicular traffic via S100.

A bilingual plaque mounted the bridge reads as follows:

This Dutch style lift bridge was opened by His Worship Wim Polak, The Mayor of Amsterdam during his official tour of Toronto Harbour on June 25th 1978. It is named the Amsterdam Bridge in Honour of Toronto's Twin City.

== See also ==
- Toronto waterfront
- Harbourfront Centre, Toronto
- Toronto Harbour
