= The Kick & Push Festival =

Theatre festival in Kingston, Ontario

- Location: Kingston, Ontario
- Founded: 2015
- Founded by: Brett Christopher, Liam Karry, Mike Sheppard
- Type of play(s): innovative theatre, immersive theatre
- Festival date: July–August
- Website: thekickandpush.com

The Kick & Push Festival, also known as the Kick & Push, is an innovative theatre festival that takes place in Kingston, Ontario every summer. The festival was founded in 2015, and is run by the Kingston Theatre Alliance. Initially in 2016, and regularly since 2019, the Kick & Push has included the Storefront Fringe Festival, a non-curated Fringe Festival administered by Theatre Kingston.

== Name ==
The festival takes its name from a nickname for the defunct Kingston and Pembroke Railway, fondly known as "the Kick and Push," which opened in 1871, and the last portion of which ceased operation in 1986.

== History ==
The first Kick & Push Festival took place in 2015, developing out of a need for summer programming at The Kingston Grand Theatre. It was founded by Brett Christopher, Liam Karry, and Mike Sheppard, under the aegis of the Kingston Theatre Alliance, a partnership between theatre organisations in Kingston to promote sector-wide development. The founding partners agreed to support the festival for three years.

In 2016, the Kick & Push introduced the Storefront Fringe Festival (also called the Kingston Fringe Festival) as part of its programming. Since its inception, the Storefront Fringe has been overseen by Theatre Kingston. Similar to other Fringe Festivals in the region, like the Toronto Fringe Festival and Ottawa Fringe Festival, shows are selected to be part of the Fringe by lottery. As its name suggests, the Storefront Fringe has frequently used abandoned storefronts in downtown Kingston as its primary venues. In 2017 and 2018, the Storefront Fringe was not part of the Kick & Push, but it was "welcomed back into the fold" for the 2019 season, and has been part of the Kick & Push since then.

Beginning in 2019, the festival has also regularly presented performances on Cedar Island, part of Thousand Islands National Park.

In 2020, despite the COVID-19 pandemic resulting in the closure of many live performance venues (including the cancellation of that year's Storefront Fringe), The Kick & Push Festival continued with mainly online programming, as well as outdoor theatre. The Fringe Festival returned in 2021, with performances taking place online and in two venues within the Grand Theatre that year.

== Shows and events ==
=== Goals ===
The festival began as a collaboration between several local theatre companies, with a focus on "theatrical innovation." Throughout its existence, the festival has articulated a goal of developing the local theatre community, and retaining young local talent. Following the departure of some of the festival's founding companies from the Kingston Theatre Alliance in 2017, the Kick & Push directed its focus towards providing opportunities for artists with ties to Kingston, as well as situating the city as a centre for cultural innovation.

According to the festival's website, as of February 2023, the Kick & Push "aims to take the audience beyond being passive observers."

=== Genres ===
Immersive theatre has been a regular part of the Kick & Push's programming since its beginning. The first two festivals featured Single Thread Theatre Company's Ambrose, a retelling of the disappearance of Ambrose Small in a small audience, immersive format taking place throughout the Kingston Grand Theatre. The 2019 festival included Tales of an Urban Indian, a performance that took place on a city bus as it travelled around the city.

Interactive theatre has also been featured regularly, as the festival's mandate to present innovative work. The inaugural festival featured Blue Canoe Theatrical Productions' production of A Chorus Line, which offered audience members the opportunity to "join the line" by being on stage for a portion of the performance. Later festivals have included the all-ages interactive installation Tin-ja (2021), a performance based around a game of Dungeons & Dragons (Roll Models, 2021), as well as the theatrical board game New Societies by Re:Current Theatre (in 2022).

In response to the COVID-19 pandemic, the festival included digital theatre as part of its programming in 2020 and 2021.

=== Venues ===
Given that the festival was founded in order to bring summer programming to the Kingston Grand Theatre, most years of the Kick & Push have used the Grand Theatre as a performance venue in some way. The festival has also used other notable Kingston locations as performance venues, including Kingston City Hall, the Screening Room, and Springer Market Square.

The festival has presented shows in secret locations (such as 2017's How We Are: Part 1: Morning After), as well as vacant storefronts as part of the Storefront Fringe Festival.

The festival has also included many outdoor performance venues, including several parks around the city, as well as Cedar Island, Wolfe Island, and throughout Sydenham Ward as part of Cadences, an audio walking tour in the 2022 festival.

=== Other events ===
Early ideas for the festival's programming included panel discussions and professional development workshops.

The festival has hosted residencies for Indigenous artists, including 2022's IndigeNIICHII: Soles on Cedar program, which took place on Cedar Island.

== Past festivals ==
Year	Featured Productions	Ref.
2015	Ambrose (Single Thread Theatre Company); AutoShow (Convergence Theatre); A Chorus Line (Blue Canoe Theatrical Productions); Shipwrecked! (Theatre Kingston); Tale of a Town (Fixt Point); Tall Ghosts and Bad Weather (The Cellar Door Project)	
2016	Ambrose (Single Thread Theatre Company); Beneath Our Feet (Lowlit Aerial Arts); Chicago (Blue Canoe Theatrical Productions); Overlooked (Refraction Theatre Collective); Stubborn Stone (The Cellar Door Project); The Storefront Fringe Festival; Taming of the Shrew (Driftwood Theatre)	
2017	Daughter (Adam Lazarus); How We Are, Part 1: The Morning After (How We Are Collective); Kid Koala's Vinyl Vaudeville: The Silliest Show on Earth; Lessons In Temperament (James L. Smith); Love Me Forever Billy H. Tender (Jesse LaVercombe); Monday Nights (6th Man Collective and The Theatre Centre); Othello (Driftwood Theatre)	
2018	Agokwe — Unplugged (Waawaate Fobister); Beta's Baby (Outside The March); Flashing Lights (Bad New Days); The Flick (Single Thread Theatre Company); Rosalynde (or, As You Like It) (Driftwood Theatre); Space Hippo (Mochinosha and the Wishes Mystical Puppet Company); SwordPlay (Sex T-Rex)	
2019	The Harrowing of Brimstone McReedy; Kitchen Chicken (L'orchestre d'hommes-orchestres); A (Musical) Midsummer Night's Dream (Driftwood Theatre); Out of the Woods; Paddle Song; Stupidhead!; The Storefront Fringe Festival; Tales of an Urban Indian	
2020	Cyrano de Bergerac (The Lakeside Players); The Itinerary: Playtest (Outside the March); Luke and the Big Circles (Ned Dickens); New Societies (Re:Current Theatre); Revelations	
2021	Cedar Island Lodge (IndigeNIICHII: Soles on Cedar); Mosher Island; Robin Hood (The Lakeside Players); Roll Models (The ArtFolk Collective); The Storefront Fringe Festival; Tin-ja (Brendon Allen); Ways of Being	
2022	Cadences (Théâtre Belvédère); IndigeNIICHII: Soles on Cedar; King Henry Five (Driftwood Theatre); New Societies (Re:Current Theatre); Pictures at an Exhibition (Jesse Wabegijig); Robin Hood (The Lakeside Players); The Return of the Megafauna! (Bad New Days); The Storefront Fringe Festival	
