= Arthur Milner =

Canadian playwright, theatre director and journalist (born 1950)

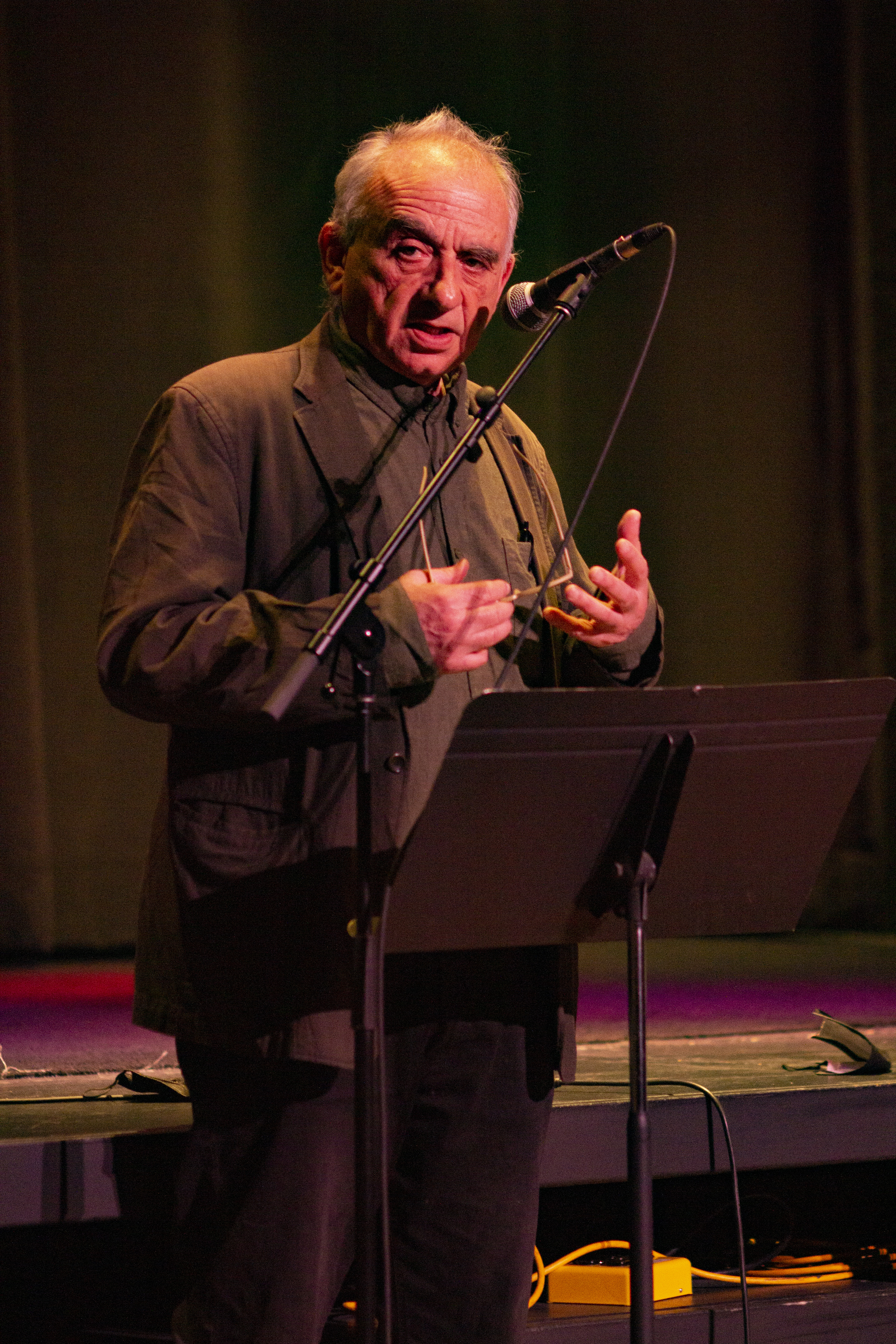
- Arthur Milner speaking at an event in 2022.
- Born: July 3, 1950 (age 76); Germany
- Occupations: Playwright, theatre director, and journalist
- Spouse: Jennifer Brewin

Arthur Milner (born July 3, 1950) is a Canadian playwright, theatre director, and journalist.

== Early life and career ==
Milner was born in Germany, and is Jewish. His parents were Polish Jews who survived the Holocaust in World War II by escaping to Russia. After several years in a Displaced Persons Camp, the family emigrated to Montreal in 1951. He is the brother of political scientist Henry Milner.

Milner was a student at Carleton University in Ottawa when friends and colleagues founded the Great Canadian Theatre Company(GCTC) in 1975. He soon joined GCTC as an actor and Board member. He was appointed resident playwright in 1984 and Artistic Director in 1991. He was elected president of the Professional Association of Canadian Theatres in 1993. He has worked as a dramaturge at the Banff Playwrights Colony, the Manitoba Association of Playwrights, and Playwrights Workshop Montréal. He has taught at Concordia University, Carleton University, Algonquin College, the National Theatre School in Montreal. Recently, he taught courses in political theatre at the University of Calgary and the University of Regina.

He has directed his own work as well as Criminals in Love by George F. Walker; Odd Fish by Pamela Boyd; Stephen and Mr. Wilde by Jim Bartley; Brothers of the Brush by Jimmy Murphy; Bedtime Story by Seán O’Casey; The London Vertigo by Brian Friel; Our Country's Good by Timberlake Wertenbaker; On the Razzle by Tom Stoppard; and, in 2014, the world premiere of George F. Walker's The Burden of Self-Awareness. Since its founding in 1992, he has written on arts and politics for Inroads, the Canadian Journal of Opinion.

He holds a Bachelor of Arts in English, Carleton University (1975); and a Master of Arts in English and Cultural Studies, Carleton University (2002) — Thesis: “Political Theatre, Modernist Marxism, and the Avant-Garde”; Thesis Advisor: Paul Keen

Milner now lives in Regina, Saskatchewan, where his wife, Jennifer Brewin, is Artistic director of Globe Theatre.

== Playwriting career ==
Milner joined GCTC as an actor but soon turned to writing plays. His first plays were adaptations of novels for children. He then worked on several collective creations, including Sandinista! which opened in Ottawa in 1982 and toured Canada. He was appointed resident playwright in 1984 and wrote a new play for GCTC every year until his appointment as Artistic Director in 1991. He has also been commissioned to write plays for Edmonton’s Workshop West Playwrights’ Theatre, Vancouver’s Green Thumb Theatre, the Canadian Broadcasting Corporation, the Canadian Union of Public Employees and the Caravan Farm Theatre.

His play Facts, a murder mystery set in the Palestinian West Bank, premiered at GCTC in 2010 and was subsequently produced in Toronto and Vancouver; in London, U.K. (Time Out Critic's Choice), and in Istanbul (in Turkish); and for a 9-city tour through Palestine and Israel (in Arabic). Getting to Room Temperature — a one-person play about Milner's mother's polite quest for assisted suicide — toured for several years after it premiered at Ottawa's Undercurrents Festival in 2016. In February 2022 it was produced by Regina-based theatre company Curtain Razors with the use of teleprompter technology.

== Awards and honours ==
Milner is the recipient of numerous awards from the Canada Council for the Arts, the Ontario Arts Council, and the City of Ottawa. He has been awarded an Honorary Membership by the Canadian Association for Theatre Research (1998); the Victor Tolgesy Award for Contribution to the Arts in Ottawa (1993); and a Canada 125 Medal.

== Major works ==
- Sandinista! (Collective) — 1982
- 1997 — 1984
- Cheap Thrill — 1985
- Zero Hour — 1986
- Learning to Live with Personal Growth — 1987
- The City — 1990
- Sisters in the Great Day Care War — 1990
- Masada — 1991
- It's Not a Country, It's Winter — 1998
- Crusader of the World — 1999
- Joan Henry: The Musical (with Allen Cole and Estelle Shook) — 2003
- Facts — 2010
- The Vicar of Dibley (Adaptation) — 2015
- Getting to Room Temperature — 2016

== Works about Arthur Milner ==
- Samer Al-Saber, "Arabic Facts in Palestine: Clashing Hybridities in Transnational Cultural Production.” Theatre Research in Canada,
- Aaron Ellis, “Arthur Milner, Two Plays about Israel/Palestine: Masada/Facts,” Journal of Jewish Ethics, Vol. 3, No. 2 (2017), pp. 276–279, Penn State University Press,
- Kevin De Ornellas, "Arthur Milner". In Gabrielle H. Cody and Evert Sprinchorn, eds, The Columbia Encyclopedia of Modern Drama, 2 volumes (Columbia University Press, 2007), volume 2, pp. 909–10. ISBN 9780231140324
