= Craig Walker (writer) =

Canadian writer, theatre director, actor and educator

- Walker in Pygmalion with Peter Aston
- Born: Craig Stewart Walker; September 25, 1960 (age 66); Richmond Hill, Ontario
- Occupations: Writer, theatre director, actor, educator

Craig Stewart Walker (born September 25, 1960) is a Canadian writer, theatre director, actor and educator.

Walker graduated from Bayview Secondary School and afterwards, began his career in theatre as an actor with the Stratford Festival, the Shaw Festival and the National Arts Centre of Canada and other companies. After returning to complete an M.A. in English and a Ph.D. in Drama at the University of Toronto, he was appointed to the Department of Drama at Queen's University in Kingston, Ontario, where he was Director from 2012 to 2015, at which point the Departments of Drama and Music merged. He continued to be Director of the Dan School of Drama and Music until 2022, and continues to be a Professor.

From 1997 until 2007, Walker served as artistic director of Theatre Kingston, a company for which he has directed many productions including his own Finnegans Wake: a dream play (based on the novel Finnegans Wake by James Joyce), which played in both Kingston and Toronto in 2001, and Aeschylus' The Oresteia, which was performed with Proteus, a satyr play Walker wrote himself to replace the one that had originally followed the trilogy, but had been lost since the 5th century BCE. In 2002, Walker wrote the book, music and lyrics for Chantecler: a musical (based loosely on a verse play by Edmond Rostand). More recently, he has worked as an actor and director with the St. Lawrence Shakespeare Festival in Prescott, Ontario. That company's production of Twelfth Night, which was directed by Walker, won the 2012 Prix Rideau Award for Outstanding Production. In 2009, he was appointed as a corresponding scholar with the Shaw Festival.

== Works by Walker ==
- The Buried Astrolabe: Canadian Dramatic Imagination and Western Tradition. McGill-Queen's University Press, 2001. ISBN 978-0773520752
- Finnegans Wake: a dream play (based on the novel by James Joyce). Produced by Theatre Kingston in 2001.
- Chantecler: a musical (book, music and lyrics; based on the play by Edmond Rostand). Produced by Theatre Kingston in 2002.
- Editor, with Jennifer Wise, The Broadview Anthology of Drama, Volume One. Broadview Press, 2003. ISBN 978-1551111391
- Editor, The Broadview Anthology of Drama, Volume Two. Broadview Press, 2003. ISBN 978-1551115825
- Editor, with Jennifer Wise, The Concise Broadview Anthology of Drama. Broadview Press, 2005. ISBN 978-1551117164
- Editor, King Lear by William Shakespeare (with facing Folio and Quarto text), The Broadview Anthology of British Literature, Volume Two, ed. Joseph Black, et al. Broadview Press, 2006. ISBN 978-1551116105
