= The Attic, the Pearls and Three Fine Girls =

Canadian comedic play

- Written by: Jennifer Brewin; Martha Ross; Ann-Marie MacDonald; Alisa Palmer; Leah Cherniak
- Characters: Jojo Fine; Jayne Fine; Jelly Fine

Premiere
- Date: 1995
- Place: Theatre Centre West, Toronto, Canada

The Attic, The Pearls and Three Fine Girls is a Canadian comedic play collectively written by Jennifer Brewin, Martha Ross, Ann-Marie MacDonald, Alisa Palmer, and Leah Cherniak. The title is sometimes stylized The Attic, The Pearls And 3 Fine Girls. The play premiered in 1995 at Theatre Centre West in Toronto, starring MacDonald, Ross, and Cherniak. Both the 1995 production and the revival in1997 were nominated for several Dora Mavor Moore Awards. In 2011, the creators of The Attic, The Pearls, and Three Fine Girls created and performed a sequel titled More Fine Girls.

== Characters ==
Jojo Fine – a divorced English professor

Jayne Fine – a lesbian financier

Jelly Fine – an artist who loves boxes

== Synopsis ==
In the prologue, entitled The Past, we are introduced to the three sisters-oldest to youngest: Jojo, a professor who is utterly captivated by her over-seas lover Brecht; Jayne, the systematic big cheese over at Bay Street and the closeted lesbian; and finally Jelly, the self-supporting artist who has a great love for peanut-butter(hence her name being Jelly). We are also introduced to the Torture Dress and the pearls (which are fake). Both of these objects were former possessions of their mother(who was not really their mother at all). Normally played with when the girls played dress up or tea party, she accidentally spilled tea on them when they were little and they have since banned her from ever having a tea party again.
When the Torture Dress is worn, the remaining Fine sisters must carry out whatever duty the sister wearing the dress commands. We are shown the powers of the Torture Dress in the first few moments where Jojo makes Jayne dance. Unlike the Torture Dress, the pearls are not to be played with. We learn this when Jelly lectures her sisters, also telling them that they were not allowed to be shoved into boxes. In the next scene, they have been requested by their father to hold a party one week from today (next Friday) to remember the one-week anniversary of their father's death. Jojo and Jayne do not realize that their father died until the very end of the scene after Jelly informs them seven times.

== Production history ==
The Attic, The Pearls and Three Fine Girls premiered in 1995 at Theatre Centre West in Toronto with Theatre Columbus. The premiere was directed by Alisa Palmer and starred Leah Cherniak as Jelly, Ann-Marie MacDonald as Jayne, and Martha Ross as Jo-Jo. The premiered featured music composed by John Millard and Allen Cole. Jennifer Brewin was listed as a dramaturge for this performance.

In 1997, the same cast and crew revived the production at Buddies in Bad Times. Brewin was credited in this performance as a "contributing artist". In 1999, Thousand Islands Playhouse performed The Attic, The Pearls and Three Fine Girls.

=== More Fine Girls ===
In 2011, Palmer, MacDonald, Cherniak, Ross, and Brewin created a sequel to the original play, entitled More Fine Girls. More Fine Girls was supposed to star MacDonald, Cherniak, and Ross reprising their roles as the Fine sisters, but Cherniak dropped out of the play last-minute. Jelly was then played by Severn Thompson. More Fine Girls was performed at Tarragon Theatre and directed by Palmer with assistant direction from Jennifer Brewin.

== Awards ==
Year	Award	Category	Result	Notes	Ref.
1995	Dora Mavor Moore Awards (Small Theatre)	Outstanding Direction	Nominated		
1995	Dora Mavor Moore Awards (Small Theatre)	Outstanding New Play or Musical	Nominated		
1995	Dora Mavor Moore Awards (Small Theatre)	Outstanding Production	Nominated		
1995	Dora Mavor Moore Awards (Small Theatre)	Female Performance	Nominated	for Leah Cherniak	
1995	Dora Mavor Moore Awards (Small Theatre)	Female Performance	Won	for Martha Ross	
1996	Floyd S. Chalmers Canadian Play Awards	N/A	Nominated	for Leah Cherniak, Ann-Marie MacDonald, Martha Ross in association with Alisa Palmer and Jennifer Brewin	
1997	Dora Mavor Moore Awards (Mid-size Theatre)	Set Design	Won	for Dany Lyne	
1997	Dora Mavor Moore Awards (Mid-size Theatre)	Lighting Design	Won	for Andrea Lundy	
1997	Dora Mavor Moore Awards (Mid-size Theatre)	Outstanding Production of a Play	Nominated		
1997	Dora Mavor Moore Awards (Mid-size Theatre)	Outstanding Performance by a Female in a Play	Nominated	for Ann-Marie MacDonald	
