= Caravan Farm Theatre =

Theatre company in British Columbia, Canada

Caravan Farm Theatre (Venue)
- Display caravan with Caravan Farm Theatre logo
- Interactive map of Caravan Farm Theatre (Venue)
- Address: Salmon River Road; Armstrong, British Columbia; Canada
- Coordinates: 50.4946°N 119.2597°W
- Owner: Bill Miner Society for Cultural Advancement
- Capacity: 500
- Type: Outdoor theatre

Construction
- Opened: 1979 (at current location)

Website
- www.caravanfarmtheatre.com

Caravan Farm Theatre (Company)
- Clydesdales and wagon on the theatre's "stage"
- Formation: 1984 (Predecessor formed 1970)
- Type: Theatre group
- Location: Armstrong, British Columbia
- Artistic director: Courtenay Dobbie
- Website: http://www.caravanfarmtheatre.com/

Caravan Farm Theatre is a professional outdoor theatre company operated by the Bill Miner Society for Cultural Advancement. The theatre is based on an 80-acre (320,000 m^{2}) farm, 11 kilometres northwest of Armstrong, British Columbia. Caravan Farm Theatre productions are always mounted outdoors in site-specific locations, with audiences of up to 500 at its farm location, three seasons of the year. Annually, Caravan Farm Theatre productions attract between 13,000 and 16,000 theatre-goers each year.

== History ==
The Caravan Farm Theatre had its genesis as a puppet troupe formed in 1970 by Paul Kirby and Adriana Kelder called The Little People's Caravan. The Little People's Caravan toured Vancouver Island by means of a horse-drawn wagon. In 1975, the troupe changed its name to The Caravan Stage Company. In 1978, the company began mounting more and larger tours, each pulled by a team of Clydesdales. In 1979, the Caravan Stage Company purchased a farm outside of Armstrong, as a base of operations and as a stud farm for its horses.

In 1984, Kirby and Kelder embarked on a three-year tour of the western United States. This resulted in a dispute arising in the Caravan Stage Company as to whether its focus was as a touring company or as a company based on the farm. This resulted in the division of the Caravan Stage Company into two separate entitites: the Caravan Stage Company (which is now based out of Kingston, Ontario, and the Caravan Farm Theatre, which continues to be based on the farm near Armstrong. Former Caravan Stage Company member Nick Hutchison (son of Jeremy Hutchinson, an English Baron, and actress Dame Peggy Ashcroft) became the founding Artistic Director of the Caravan Farm Theatre. Caravan Farm Theatre soon began producing a mix of original and classic works for local audiences, often utilising the skills of actors, designers, musicians, and technicians who lived on or near the farm property. In 1989, the company began operating a one-act winter sleigh ride show.

Hutchison stepped down as Artistic Director in 1993. After a brief period of operations under an interim group, composer and writer Allen Cole took over as the new Artistic Director. Cole served in that role until 1998, when he was replaced by Estelle Shook (whose first exposure to the company was in 1979 when her mother took a job there as a cook) and Jennifer Brewin as Co-artistic Directors. In 2005, Brewin stepped down, leaving Shook to carry on in the position.

Caravan Farm Theatre audience

In 2008, through the assistance of a local charitable organization, Caravan Farm Theatre built a rain venue on the farm. The rain venue allows the company to continue performances despite inclement weather, for audiences of up to 200 people.

Shook chose to leave the Artistic Director position in 2010. To mark the occasion, six Vancouver theatre companies joined with Caravan Farm Theatre to mount a production of Everyone, a modern morality play. The play featured seven scenes with seven Clydesdale and Fjord-drawn wagons.

Shook was replaced as Artistic Director by actor, director and choreographer Courtenay Dobbie in September 2010.

== Contributors ==
Many noted Canadian theatre artists have contributed to Caravan Farm Theatre productions over many years, including:

- Peter Anderson, star of the CanStage production of The Overcoat
- Peter Hinton-Davis, Artistic Director of the National Arts Centre in Ottawa.
- Vincent de Tourdonnet, writer of musicals produced by CanStage, The National Arts Centre and La Place Des Arts.
- Jennifer Brewin, Writer, Director and Producer who went on to lead notable theatre companies; Toronto's Common Boots Theatre, and Regina's Globe Theatre
- Martin Julien, Toronto stage and TV actor
- Amiel Gladstone, West Coast based playwright and director, who wrote Caravan Farm Theatre productions We Three Queens, and East O' the Sun, West O' the Moon.

== Representative productions ==
Plays produced by the Caravan Farm Theatre include:

- A Midsummer Night's Dream
- Everyone
- The Story
- The Secret Sorrow of Hatchet Jack MacPhee
- Mother Courage and her Children
- King Lear
- The Blue Horse
- East O' the Sun West O' the Moon
- The Tell Tale Heart
- Macbeth
- We Three Queens
- The I O U Land
- A Night in the Woods
- Cyrano of the Northwest
- The Man from the Capital
- Horseplay
- Cowboy King
- The Dog and the Angel
- The Tragical Comedy of Punch and Judy
