= Ann-Marie MacDonald =

Canadian playwright, novelist, actress and broadcast journalist

Ann-Marie MacDonald OC
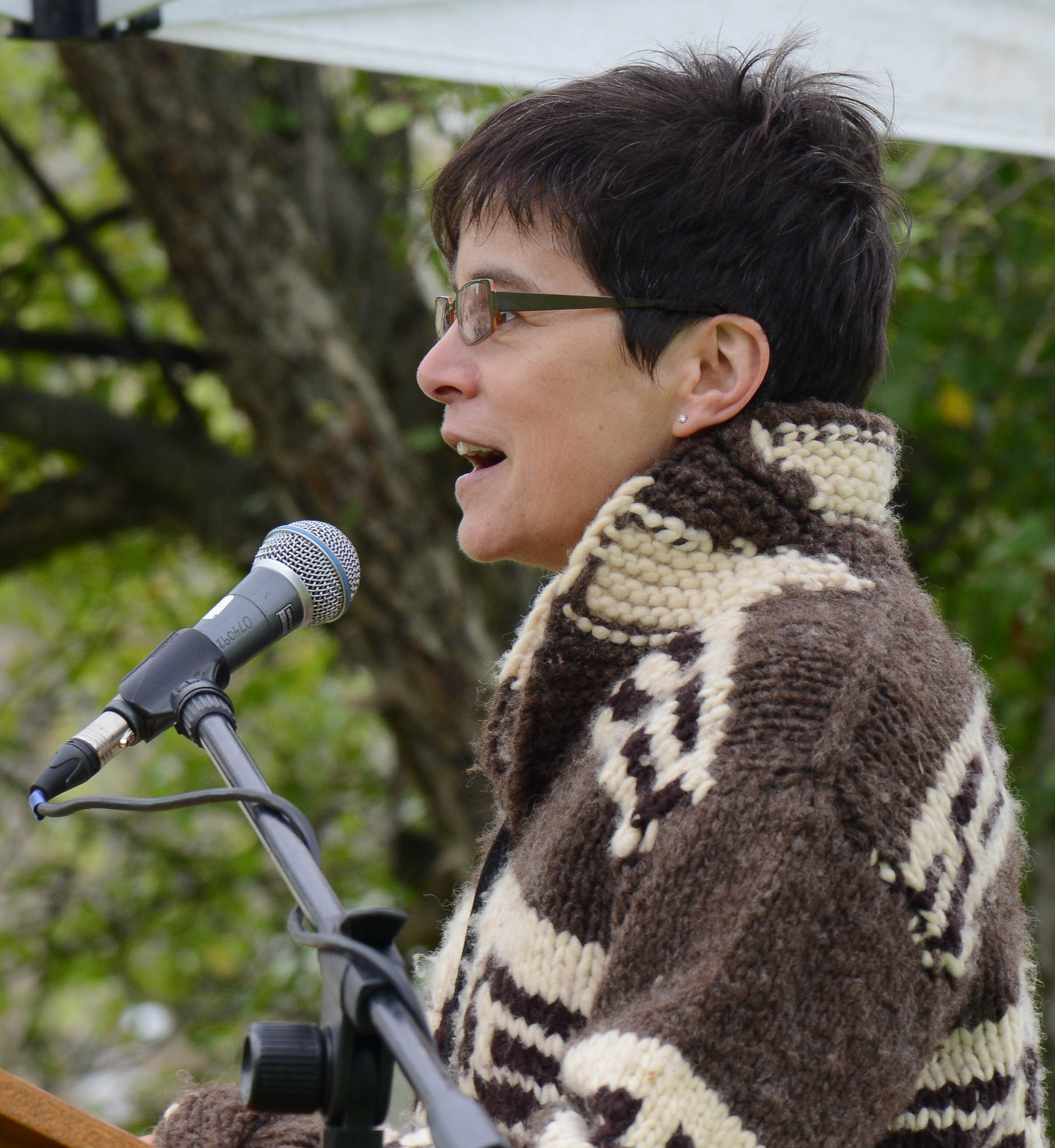
- MacDonald at the Eden Mills Writers' Festival in 2015
- Born: October 29, 1958 (age 68); CFB Baden-Soellingen, West Germany
- Occupations: Playwright, novelist, actress, broadcast host
- Spouse: Alisa Palmer
- Writing career
- Notable works: Goodnight Desdemona; Fall on Your Knees; The Way the Crow Flies; Adult Onset
- Website: annmariemacdonald.com

Ann-Marie MacDonald OC (born October 29, 1958) is a Canadian playwright, author, actress, and broadcast host who lives in Toronto, Ontario.

== Life and career ==
MacDonald was born in the former West Germany, to a father of Highland Scots descent whose family were exiled during the Clearances, and her mother was the child of Lebanese immigrants who fled oppression under the Ottoman Empire in the early twentieth century. She lived her first years on Royal Canadian Air Force Station, 4-Wing.

MacDonald won the Commonwealth Writers Prize for her first novel, Fall on Your Knees (1996), which was selected for Oprah Winfrey's Book Club in January 2002.

MacDonald received the Governor General's Award for Drama, the Floyd S. Chalmers Canadian Play Award, and the Canadian Authors Association Drama Award for her play, Goodnight Desdemona (Good Morning Juliet).

MacDonald hosted the CBC documentary series Life and Times for seven seasons. MacDonald also hosted CBC's flagship documentary program, Doc Zone for eight seasons.

She appeared in the films I've Heard the Mermaids Singing and Better Than Chocolate, among others.

MacDonald's 2003 novel, The Way the Crow Flies, was partly inspired by the Steven Truscott case. Her third novel Adult Onset was released in 2014 and has been translated into five languages. Her fourth novel Fayne was published in 2022.

She was the inaugural Mordecai Richler Reading Room Writer in Residence at Concordia University, and she coaches students in the Acting and Playwriting Programs at the National Theatre School of Canada.

In 2008, MacDonald was awarded an honorary doctorate of humanities by the University of Windsor.

In May 2015, MacDonald was the "big-name author" and "public face" of the inaugural Canadian Authors for Indies Day, organized to bring attention to independent bookstores across the country. Nearly 100 stores and 270 authors participated in the nationwide event.

In December 2018, MacDonald was named as an Officer of the Order of Canada, in recognition of "her multi-faceted contributions to the arts in Canada and for her advocacy of LGBTQ+ and women's rights".

In 2019, MacDonald was diagnosed with seronegative rheumatoid arthritis, which affected every aspect of her life, including work. She finished her novel Fayne while strapped to a chair in order to be able to type. Her illness caused the novel's completion to be delayed by a year. As of 2023, she is symptom-free.

In 2026, MacDonald endorsed Avi Lewis in that year's federal NDP leadership race.

MacDonald is married to the Canadian playwright and theatre director Alisa Palmer.

== Works ==
=== Theatre ===
- This is For You, Anna - 1983 (play, collective creation)
- Nancy Drew, The Case of the Missing Mother - 1984 (play, co-authored with Beverley Cooper)
- Clue in the Fast Lane - 1985 (play, co-authored with Beverley Cooper)
- Goodnight Desdemona (Good Morning Juliet) – 1988 (play)
- The Arab's Mouth – 1990 (play)
- Nigredo Hotel – 1992 (opera libretto)
- The Attic, the Pearls and Three Fine Girls – 1995 (play, co-authored with Jennifer Brewin, Martha Ross, Leah Cherniak, and Alisa Palmer)
- Anything That Moves – 2000 (book and lyrics for musical)
- Belle Moral – 2005 (play; a substantially revised version of The Arab's Mouth (above))

=== Novels ===
- Fall on Your Knees (1996)
- The Way the Crow Flies (2003)
- Adult Onset (2014)
- Fayne (2022)

=== Filmography ===
==== Films ====
- The Wars (1983)
- Unfinished Business (1984)
- I've Heard the Mermaids Singing (1987)
- Where the Spirit Lives (1989)
- Where the Heart Is (1990)
- Paint Cans (1994)
- Getting Away with Murder (1996)
- Better Than Chocolate (1999)
- The Girlfriend Interviews (short, 2001)
- Interviews with My Next Girlfriend (short, 2002)

==== Television (as actress or host) ====
- Rubberface (TV movie, 1981)
- Mafia Princess (TV movie, 1986)
- Hot Shots (TV series, 1986)
- Airwolf (TV series, 1987)
- Adderly (TV series, 1987)
- Captain Power and the Soldiers of the Future (TV series, 1987)
- Alfred Hitchcock Presents (TV series, 1987–1989)
- Diamonds (TV series, 1988)
- Rin Tin Tin: K-9 Cop (TV series, 1988–1991)
- Street Legal (TV series, 1990)
- Beyond Reality (TV series, 1991–1992)
- E.N.G. (TV series, 1992–1993)
- Shattered Trust: The Shari Karney Story (TV movie, 1993)
- The Babymaker: The Dr. Cecil Jacobson Story (TV movie, 1994)
- Due South (TV series, 1995)
- Friends at Last (TV movie, 1995)
- Her Desperate Choice (TV movie, 1996)
- Life and Times (TV documentary series host, 1996–2006)
- Too Close to Home (TV movie, 1997)
- A Taste of Shakespeare (TV series, 1997)
- The Industry (TV series, 2003)
- The Unsexing of Emma Edmonds (TV movie, 2004)
- The L Word (TV series, 2006)
- Slings & Arrows (TV series, 2006)
- Doc Zone (TV documentary series host, 2009–2015)

==== Television (as writer) ====
- Street Legal (TV series, 1988)
- Beyond Reality (TV series, 1992)
- Ready or Not (TV series, 1994–1995)

== See also ==
- List of Canadian playwrights
