= Harbourfront Centre =

Organization in Toronto, Ontario, Canada

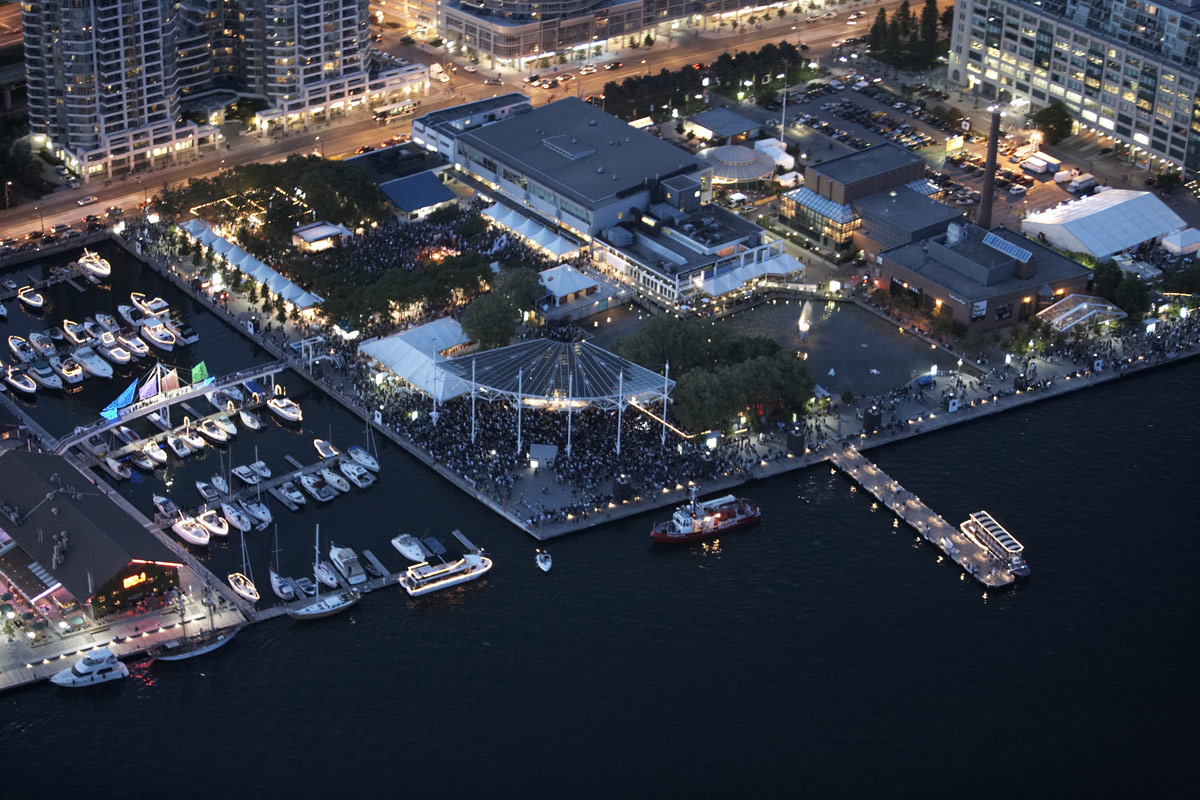
- Aerial shot of Harbourfront Centre site

- Location within Toronto
- Established: January 1, 1991
- Location: 235 Queens Quay West; Toronto, Ontario; M5J 2G8
- Coordinates: 43.638834°N 79.3818785°W
- Visitors: 12 million/year
- Public transit access: 509 Exhibition or 510 Spadina streetcar from Union Station
- Website: harbourfrontcentre.com

Harbourfront Centre is a cultural organization on the waterfront of Toronto, Ontario, Canada, situated at 235 Queens Quay West. Established as a crown corporation in 1972 by the Government of Canada to create a waterfront park, it became a non-profit organization in 1991. Funding comes from corporate sponsors, government grants, individual donors and entrepreneurial activities. Harbourfront Centre has a seating capacity of 2,000.

Harbourfront Centre works with over 450 community organizations, and hosts more than 4,000 events a year in many disciplines such as theatre, dance, literature, music, film, visual arts and craft. The development is governed by a 26-person community based volunteer Board of Directors, and is assisted by approximately 2,000 volunteers who generously contribute their efforts and time. Harbourfront Centre is patrolled by its own in-house security team, which works closely with police to ensure that the property is protected.

== History ==
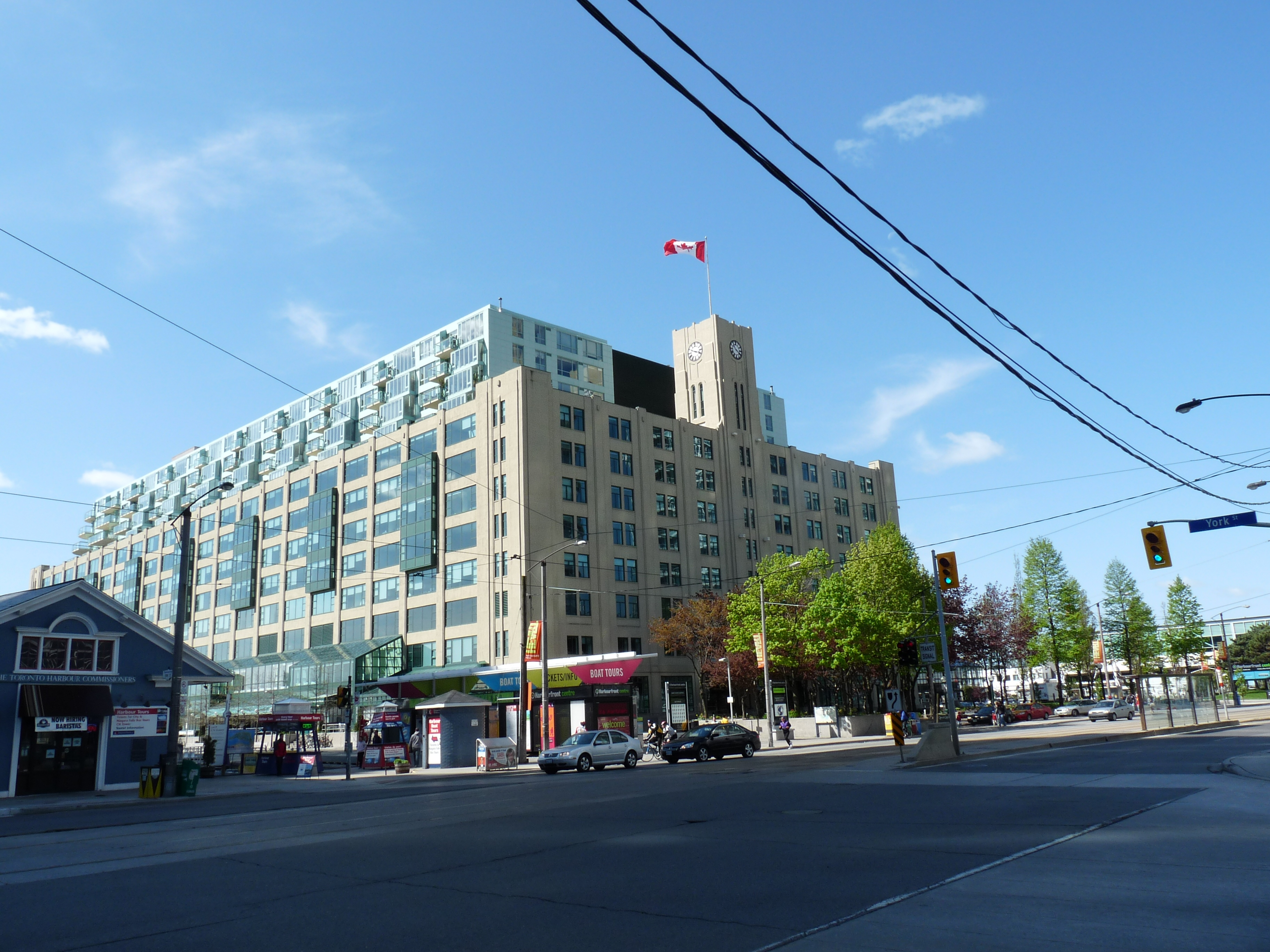
Queen's Quay Terminal was remodelled in 1982 in an effort to revitalize Harbourfront Centre.

The Government of Canada faced mounting criticism from the City of Toronto government due to the amount of money being spent for Montreal on both Expo 67 and the 1976 Summer Olympics. Hence, the Government of Canada decided that it would build Harbourfront Centre and the Government of Ontario would build nearby Ontario Place in order to revitalize Toronto's industrial harbour and increase tourism to the city. As a result, the Government of Canada committed to buying 100 hectares of land to be appropriated for public use.

In 1972 "Harbourfront Corporation" was established as a federal Crown Corporation. In 1975, the top portion of the CN Tower was housed at Harbourfront Centre, and schoolchildren were asked to sign it before it was installed. In the following decades, the area saw a number of uses, hosting children's summer day camps in 1978, and hosting the Cirque du Soleil which performed in the area in 1985. The first WOMAD festival in Canada was held at Harbourfront Centre in 1988.

Harbourfront Centre was formed on January 1, 1991, as a non-profit charitable organization with a mandate to organize and present public events and to operate a 10-acre (40,000 m^{2}) site encompassing York Quay and John Quay (south of Queens Quay West).

In 1982, Queen's Quay Terminal was remodelled by Zeidler Partnership Architects (the same firm that designed the Toronto Eaton Centre). The project transformed the industrial space into a mixed-use building that included shops, restaurants, offices, and exclusive residential condos (it once was the home for Premier Mike Harris).

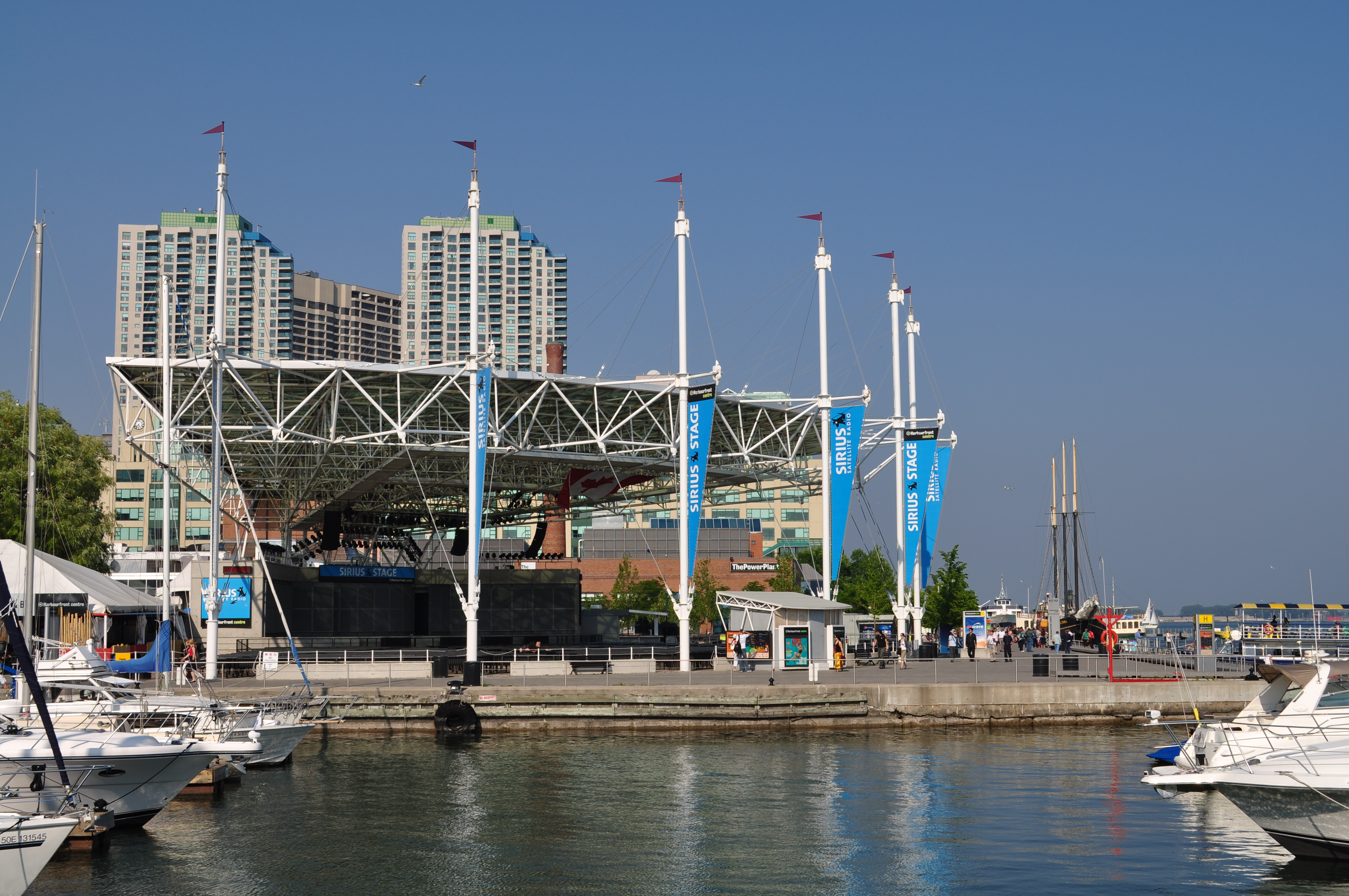
The concert stage at Harbourfront Centre hosts performances for the public.

Since its inception, Harbourfront Centre has been introducing Toronto audiences to artists and art forms that would not normally be seen in commercial venues. Artists who have performed at Harbourfront Centre: Celine Dion, Oscar Peterson, Robert Lepage, STOMP, Julio Iglesias, Spalding Gray, Philip Glass, Ann Murray, k.d. lang, Jim Carrey, Feist, Lillian Allen, and Gordon Lightfoot.

In 2001, Harbourfront Centre organized "World Leaders: A Festival of Creative Genius," to pay homage to 14 renowned global cultural leaders. The participating artists included Issey Miyake, Guy Laliberté, Philippe Starck, Frank Gehry, Lily Tomlin, Stephen Sondheim, Bernardo Bertolucci, Robert Rauschenberg, Harold Pinter, Joni Mitchell, Robert Lepage, Peter Gabriel, Quincy Jones, and Pina Bausch. Each artist had a dedicated night where they received an award and delivered a talk. In 2004, Harbourfront Centre has hosted the Planet IndigenUS Festival, a multi-day celebration and global exploration of contemporary Indigenous civilizations.

== Programming ==
Harbourfront Centre runs year-round programming with a combination of indoor and outdoor events. In the winter months more emphasis is put on theatre shows.

=== Cultural programming ===
Main events:

Title	Date	Disciplines
Authors at Harbourfront Centre	September to June	Literary
International Festival of Authors	October	Literary
NextSteps	September to June	Dance
Summer Festivals	May to October	Multidisciplinary - Free multicultural festival series
World Stage	February to May	Theatre, dance, multidisciplinary performance

=== Educational programming ===
Main events:

Title	Date	Age group	Details
School Visits	September to June	Grades K-12	Elementary and secondary programs
Camps	March and July–August	Ages 3–17	March Break and summer camps

== Venues ==
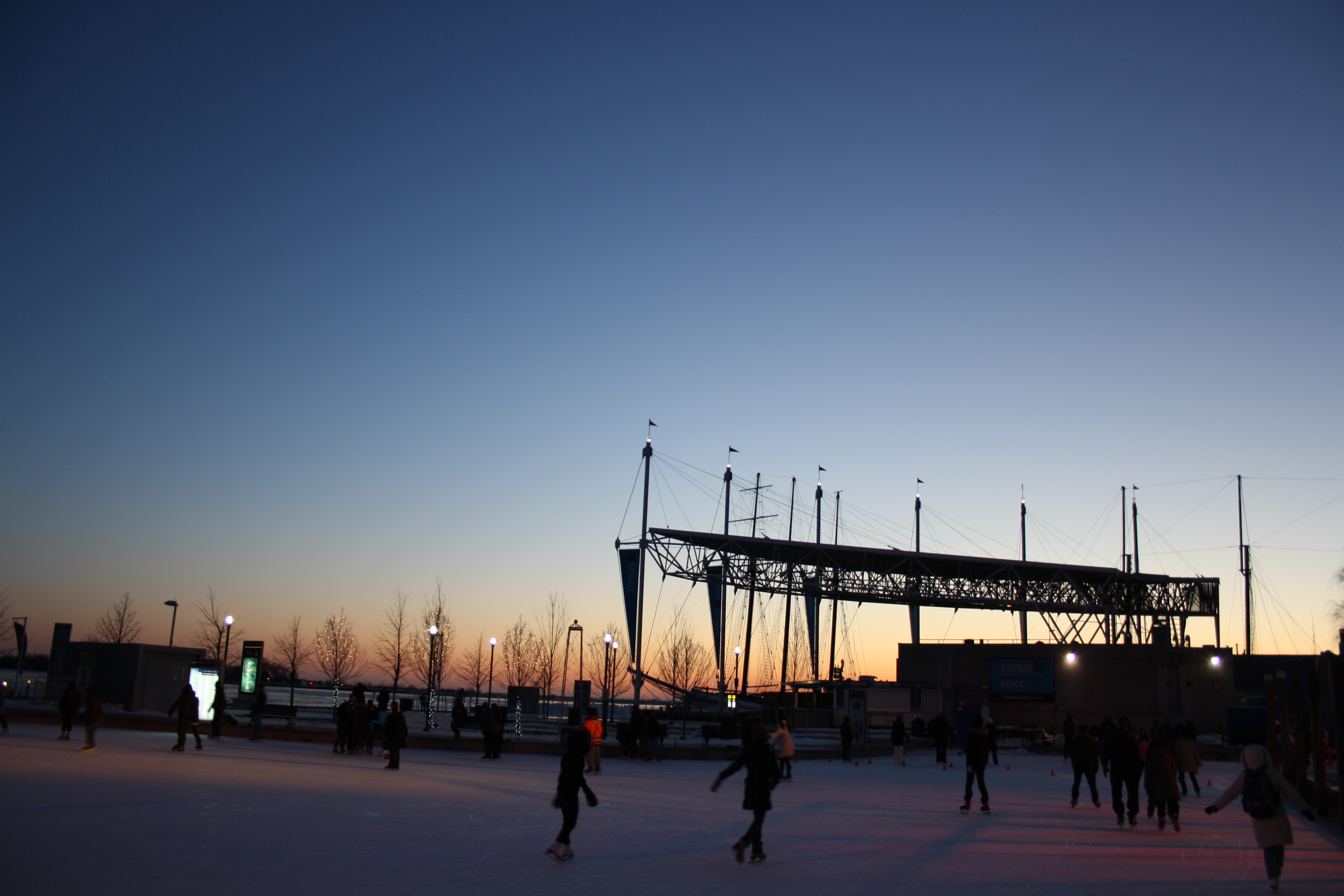
A skating rink is located at Harbourfront Centre.

- Harbourfront Centre Theatre (formerly known as the Enwave Theatre, and prior to that the du Maurier Theatre Centre) — 420-seat theatre
- Fleck Dance Theatre
- The Power Plant Contemporary Art Gallery
- Visual Arts galleries; exhibition space
- Harbourfront Stage — outdoor concert venue (formerly Westjet Stage)
- Lakeview Market
- World Café
- Toronto Music Garden — designed by Yo Yo Ma and Julie Moir Messervy
- Studio Theatre
- Brigantine Room
- Marilyn Brewer Community Space
- Lakeside Terrace
- Miss Lou's Room
- Craft & Design — studio for artists creating ceramic, glass, metal and textiles
- Harbourfront Centre Shop

== See also ==
- Amsterdam Bridge
- Toronto Maritime Museum
- Toronto waterfront
  - Harbourfront - the neighbourhood surrounding Harbourfront Centre
  - Toronto Harbour
