= Residence of John Curtin =

Former home of Australian Prime Minister John Curtin

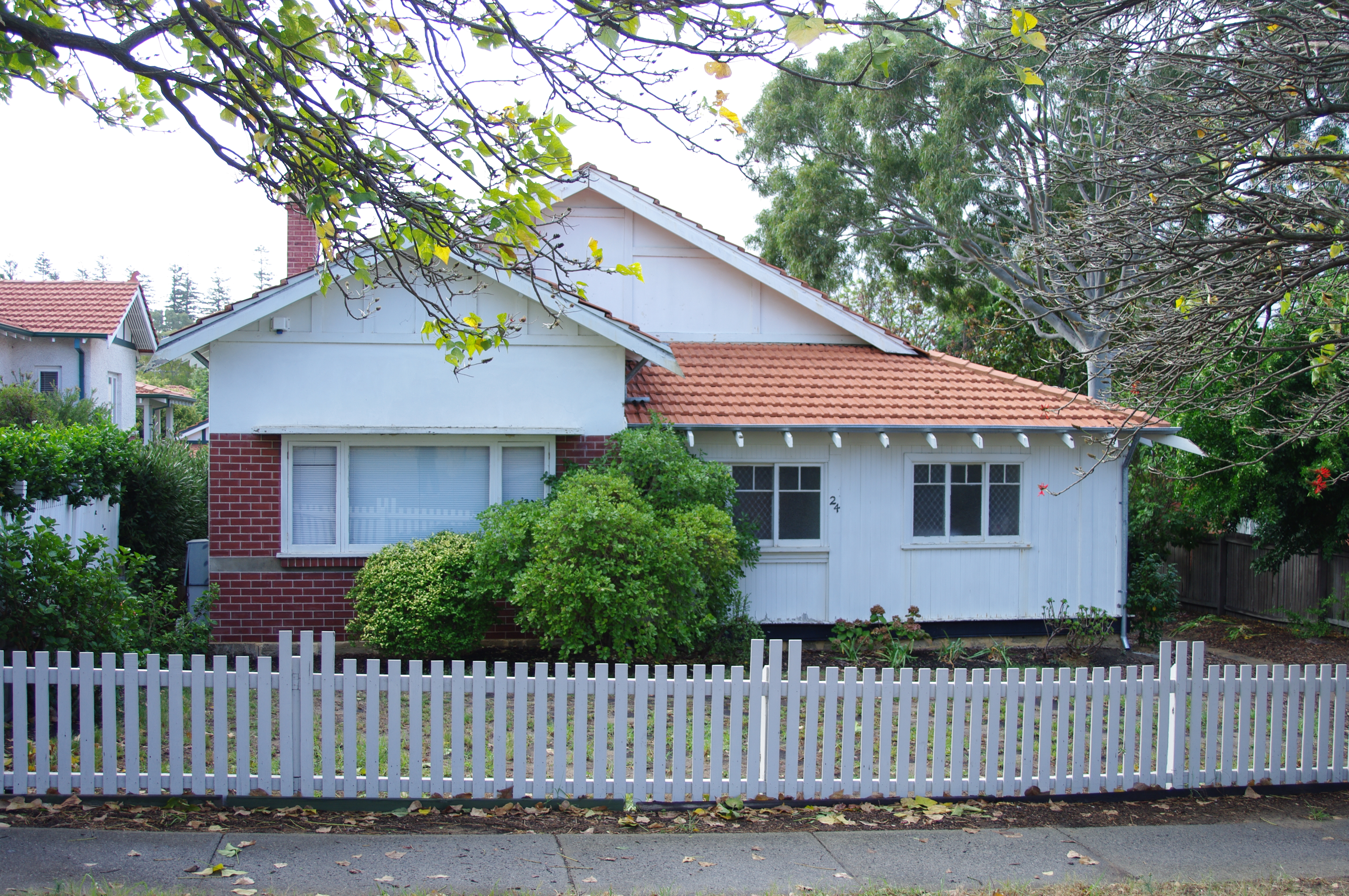
- Front of John Curtin's house
- Interactive map of the Residence of John Curtin area

General information
- Type: Home of former Prime Minister John Curtin
- Location: Cottesloe, Western Australia
- Coordinates: 31.9987°S 115.759°E

Western Australia Heritage Register
- Type: State Registered Place
- Designated: 12 May 2000
- Reference no.: 7935

John Curtin's house was the home of Prime Minister John Curtin in Cottesloe, Western Australia. Built in 1923, it was the Curtin family home until it was bought jointly by Western Australian Government and the Australian Government in 1998. The house is an interwar California bungalow design, designed by Curtin, and one of the first buildings built by Arnold Bullock, a prominent builder in the Cottesloe area during the late 1920s and 1930s.

== Land history ==
Very little development occurred in the area between 1829 and 1880. In 1882, following the opening of the Fremantle to Guildford train line in 1881, Robert Napoleon Bullen purchased land to develop the Albion pleasure grounds. In 1886 the Governor of Western Australia, Sir Frederick Broome, named the area Cottesloe in honour of Baron Cottesloe, with little subdivision occurring during the next 10 years. It was not until the goldrushes during the late 1890s that the area grew to some 300 houses. Cottesloe and the beach grew in popularity with many holiday and permanent residences being built.

In 1913, lot 166 was sold to lawyer Joseph Barsden and Claremont resident Walter Finey, who subdivided the lot in 1914. Lot 26 of this subdivision was then sold to Horatio Richardson of East Guildford in 1919, with the land remaining vacant until it was sold to John Curtin's wife, Elsie Curtin, in 1923. Lot 26, and subsequently the house, was addressed as number 14 Jarrad Street until the later part of the 1930s when the street numbers were altered and it became the current address 24 Jarrad Street.

== Building ==
In 1923 John Curtin was the editor of the Westralian Worker and president of the Western Australian branch of the Australian Journalists' Association. With an eye to a political future, Curtin wanted the building to have the verandah around the whole house so that he could practice his speeches even when it was raining. Curtin is believed to have designed the house based on the contemporary California bungalow design popular during the inter war period of the 1920s–1930s, taking Elsie's wishes into consideration the final design had the verandah on three sides.

When completed in August 1923 the house consisted of two bedrooms, a living room, a kitchen and a bathroom which was off the rear verandah. Additionally there was an external laundry area attached to the rear of the northwest corner of the house, the outhouse with wood shed attached was situated in the north west corner of the block. Though the street front was to the south, the entrance to the house was on the eastern side with a path to the street. The house was built of brick with a timber frame and tiled roof, all of the external buildings had a corrugated iron roof with the outhouse made of brick while the laundry and wood shed are constructed of a timber frame with weatherboard sides.

== General references ==
- Heritage register
