= Jessie Argyle =

Australian Aboriginal woman

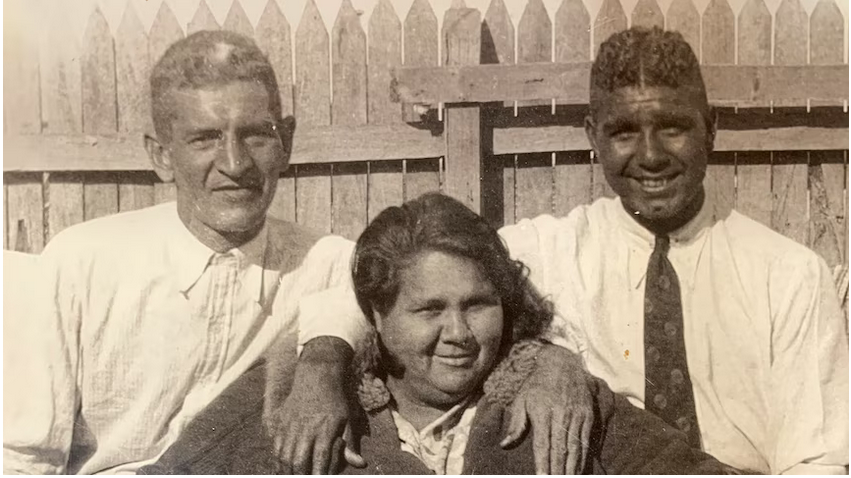
- Born: Gypsy Argyle c. 1900; East Kimberley, Western Australia
- Died: 1 September 1955 (aged 54–55); Royal Perth Hospital
- Resting place: Karrakatta Cemetery
- Other names: Duchess of Glendower Street, Mum Smith
- Occupation: Domestic servant
- Known for: Aboriginal community leader; interracial marriage with Englishman Edward Smith; institutional experiences
- Spouse: Edward Smith

Jessie Argyle (born Gypsy Argyle; c. 1900 – 1 September 1955) was an Australian Aboriginal woman from the East Kimberley region of Western Australia who has been cited by many writers in reference to the appropriation of Aboriginal earnings by the Aborigines Department and the politics of interracial relationships in a racially divided nation. She married an Englishman named Edward Smith and remained dedicated to the Aboriginal community.

== Early life ==
Argyle was born in 1900 in the East Kimberley region of Western Australia to an Aboriginal woman and a white cattleman. After the Western Australian Aboriginal Act (1905) was passed, her and her half brother were deemed orphans and forced to travel 150 miles by foot from Argyle Police Station to Wyndham in 1906. From there, a cattle steamer, Bullara, took them to Fremantle, then by train to Swan Native and Half Caste Mission in Guildford, an Anglican reformatory and industrial school. As part of the assimilation process, she was forced to give up her name, Gypsy, and became Jessie Argyle.

== Entering the workforce ==
Argyle interned for 13 years at the reformatory and was trained as a domestic servant. She was contracted to work at Bridgetown for her first job, and was a servant there for a decade. She received low wages for long hours, with over half of her earnings being paid to the Aborigine Department, and the measly 5 shillings a week she was allowed to keep was often withheld from her, which the Department claimed was for the protection of her welfare. She was faced with poor living conditions, strict curfews, and abuse from the Aborigines Department. Suffering from recurring bone disease, Jessie was removed in 1924 to Moore River Native Settlement for a year for time to heal. However, she attributed her removal to her relationship with Englishman Edward Alfred Byron Smith. Jessie worked in the sewing room and nurses quarters at the institution, known for their harsh conditions. She snuck a letter to her previous boss, who allowed her to return. In 1925, she resumed her relationship with Smith under close supervision from employers and the Aborigine Department. Argyle's story is often cited in reference to the appropriation of Aboriginal wealth and autonomy by the Australian government.

== Relationship ==
Argyle is most well known for her interracial relationship with Edward Smith, an Englishman who worked for The West Australian newspaper. On 3 February 1930, Argyle married Smith at St Bartholomew's Anglican Church in East Perth after the Aborigines Department removed its restrictions on their relationship. They rented a house on Glendover Street, North Perth, which became a significant place for the Aboriginal community.

Their relationship became a symbol of the struggles of interracial love in Australia, and the ongoing strict societal divide. Ann McGrath writes in her article Celebrating white men and their black lovers for The Herald, "They fell in love in a society deeply divided on racial lines but why did such couples have to flee like exiles? Possibly it was because their unions threatened to expose a hidden fault-line of Australian colonialism – one whose legacies are with us today."

== Activism ==
Argyle's house on Glendover Street was important to the Aboriginal community. She provided refuge for domestic servants between jobs, women visiting their children in institutions, Aboriginal World War II soldiers, and for anyone seeking companionship. Argyle welcomed Aboriginal folk into her home and entertained them with marathon card games. The department was suspicious of the gatherings in Argyle's home, suspicious of her for crime or prostitution. The Commissioner of the Police threatened to charged Smith over an Aboriginal youth lodging, which is prohibited under Section 21b of the 1905 Act. Argyle is remembered as a strong and lively woman, and was known as the ‘Duchess of Glendover Street’ or "Mum Smith".

== Legacy ==
In 2003, Argyle's great grandson Stephen Kinnane published Shadow Lines, a memoir of the relationship between Argyle and Smith and Kinnane's connection to this history. The story discusses the politics of the love between the interracial couple and Kinanne's personal connection to his family history, as well as the history of Aboriginal oppression. The book blends history dug up from his great grandmother's files as well as his own imagination about his great-grandparents’ lives.

Kinnane documents the destruction of many of Argyle's files, especially from 1938 into the 1950s, after the appointment of Stanley G. Middleton as Commissioner for Native Affairs, whose policy centered around assimilation and bringing the "Australian way of life" to Aboriginal families. In his article "Submission to the Legal and Constitutional References [Senate] Committee: Inquiry into Indigenous workers whose paid labour was controlled by Government", he cites Argyle's story and the appropriation of her money by the department as well of the destruction of her files.

Kinnane also co- wrote Ghost Files; the missing files of the Department of Indigenous Affairs Archives with Lauren Marsh, a book that explores the destruction of personal files by the Department of Indigenous Affairs, Department of Native Welfare (1955–72), Department of Native Affairs (1936–55), and Aborigines Department (1926–36).

== Death ==
Argyle was admitted to Royal Perth Hospital in 1954 after suffering from diabetic ulcers. After having her left leg amputated, family and friends came to visit her to show their support and play cards. She died on 1 September 1955 of coronary insufficiency associated with septicaemia and was buried in Karrakatta cemetery.
