= Aidan de Brune =

English author and journalist (1874–1946)

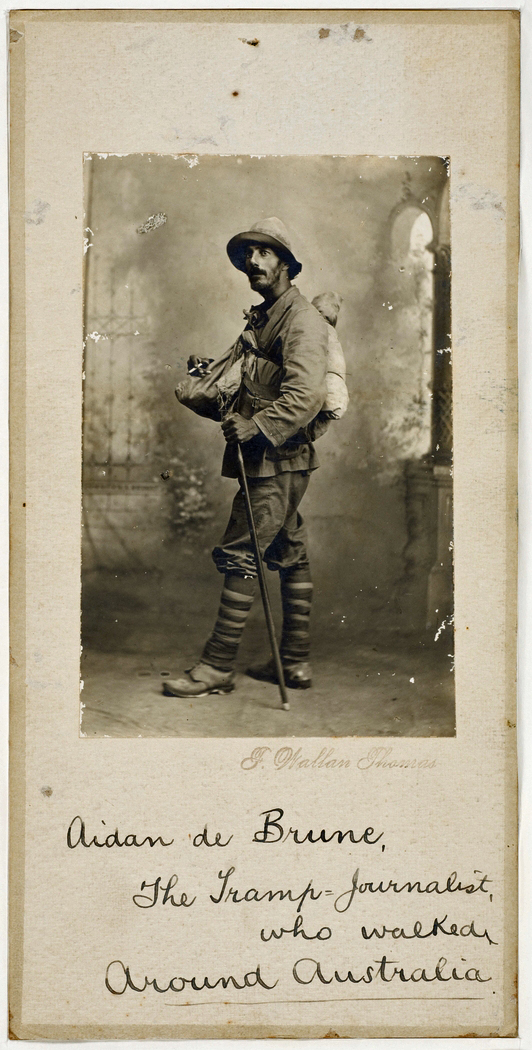
- Aidan de Brune before beginning his walk around Australia in 1921
- Born: Herbert Charles Cull; 17 July 1874; London, England
- Died: 15 February 1946 (aged 71); Sydney
- Other names: Frank de Broune, John Morriss, H. F. C. de B. Culle
- Known for: Journalist, author

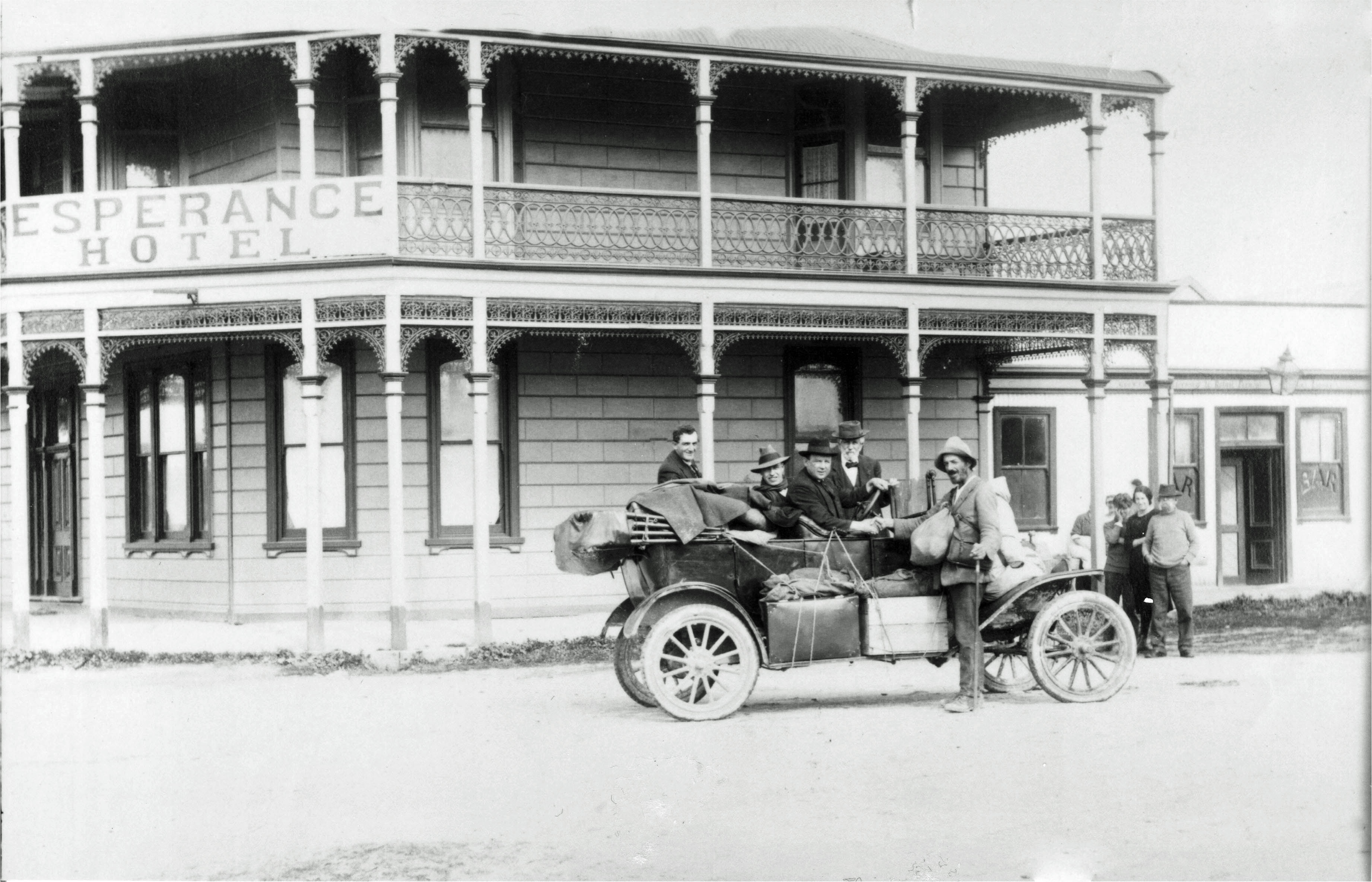
Aidan de Brune in Esperance, Western Australia in 1923, during his walk around Australia

Aidan de Brune (17 July 1874 – 15 February 1946) was an English journalist, author and was the first person in recorded history to walk around the perimeter of Australia, unaccompanied and unassisted.

== Walk from Fremantle to Sydney ==
De Brune left Fremantle, Western Australia on 24 November 1920 and walked to Sydney by way of Kalgoorlie, along the Trans-Australian Railway, and then via Adelaide and Melbourne, a distance of approximately 4,500 kilometres (2,800 mi). He walked along the railway line for most the way, unaccompanied and unassisted. He intended to walk the distance in 85 days, but took 90 days, averaging about 48 kilometres (30 mi) per day.

He claimed some records for parts of his walk:

- Fremantle to Kalgoorlie, 387 miles (623 km) in 10½ days
- Across Western Australia (Fremantle to Deakin), 841 miles (1,353 km) in 24 days
- Kalgoorlie to Port Augusta, via Trans-Australian Railway, 1,051 miles (1,691 km) in 46 days
- Nullarbor Plain, 400 miles (644 km), in 11½ days
- Fremantle to Adelaide, 1,710 miles (2,752 km), in 52 days
- Fremantle to Melbourne, 2,199 miles (3,539 km), in 68 days
- Fremantle to Sydney, 2,792.5 miles (4,494 km), in 90 days
- Adelaide to Melbourne, 489 miles (787 km), in 16 days
- Adelaide to Sydney, 1,082 miles (1,741 km), in 38 days
- Melbourne to Sydney. 593.5 miles (955 km), in 22 days

== Walk around Australia ==
On 20 September 1921 he began a walk around the perimeter of Australia, from Sydney to Sydney, anticlockwise. De Brune described his goal to be "to leave Sydney on foot, to walk ten thousand miles [16,000 km] (more or less) around Australia, calling at all the ports en route on the four coasts, and to return to Sydney." He proposed taking twelve months to complete the walk. However, in the event, he took two and a half years, arriving back in Sydney on 4 March 1924.

De Brune kept a diary during his walk, in which he made daily entries detailing the distance walked each day and the total distance to-date. He also invited people he met along the way to certify his presence at the location he was at and to make comments. After he finished his walk he donated the diary and a typescript of the contents of the diary to the State Library of New South Wales.

J T Beckett, a journalist, had met de Brune in Darwin, during de Brune's walk. A newspaper article written by Beckett appeared when de Brune was in Penong, South Australia, about 1,700 miles (2,700 km) from finishing his walk. Beckett concluded the article: "Aiden de Brune has not finished his walk but should he never move another yard further, he will have put up a record that few, if any, will ever attempt to equal."

== Personal life ==
De Brune was born Herbert Charles Cull in London, England and started his professional life as a printer. He married Ethel Elizabeth Crofts in 1907 and a son, Lionel, was born in 1909.

In 1910 Cull went to Australia, arriving in Fremantle, Western Australia on 23 May 1910. His wife and child followed him and arrived in Albany, Western Australia on 26 November 1910.

In 1912 Cull's wife and son returned to England. Cull remained in Australia for the rest of his life. In early 1920 he was working for the Bunbury Herald newspaper and wrote two serial stories: The Pursuits of Mr Peter Pell and The Mystery of the Nine Stars. The latter story was unfinished when, in November 1920, Cull left the newspaper and began to walk from Fremantle to Sydney, following the Trans-Australian Railway. When he reached Sydney, in early 1921, Cull was calling himself Aidan de Brune.

After his walk around Australia, de Brune settled in Sydney and began writing serialised mystery stories for newspapers. He also crossed paths with Marion Bell, the first woman to encircle Australia by car, while she rested in Sydney and wrote at least one article about her experiences.

Aidan de Brune/Herbert Charles Cull died in Sydney on 15 February 1946. His death was registered as that of Aidan de Brune. He was buried in Botany Cemetery.
