= John Curtin =

Prime Minister of Australia from 1941 to 1945

The Right Honourable John Curtin
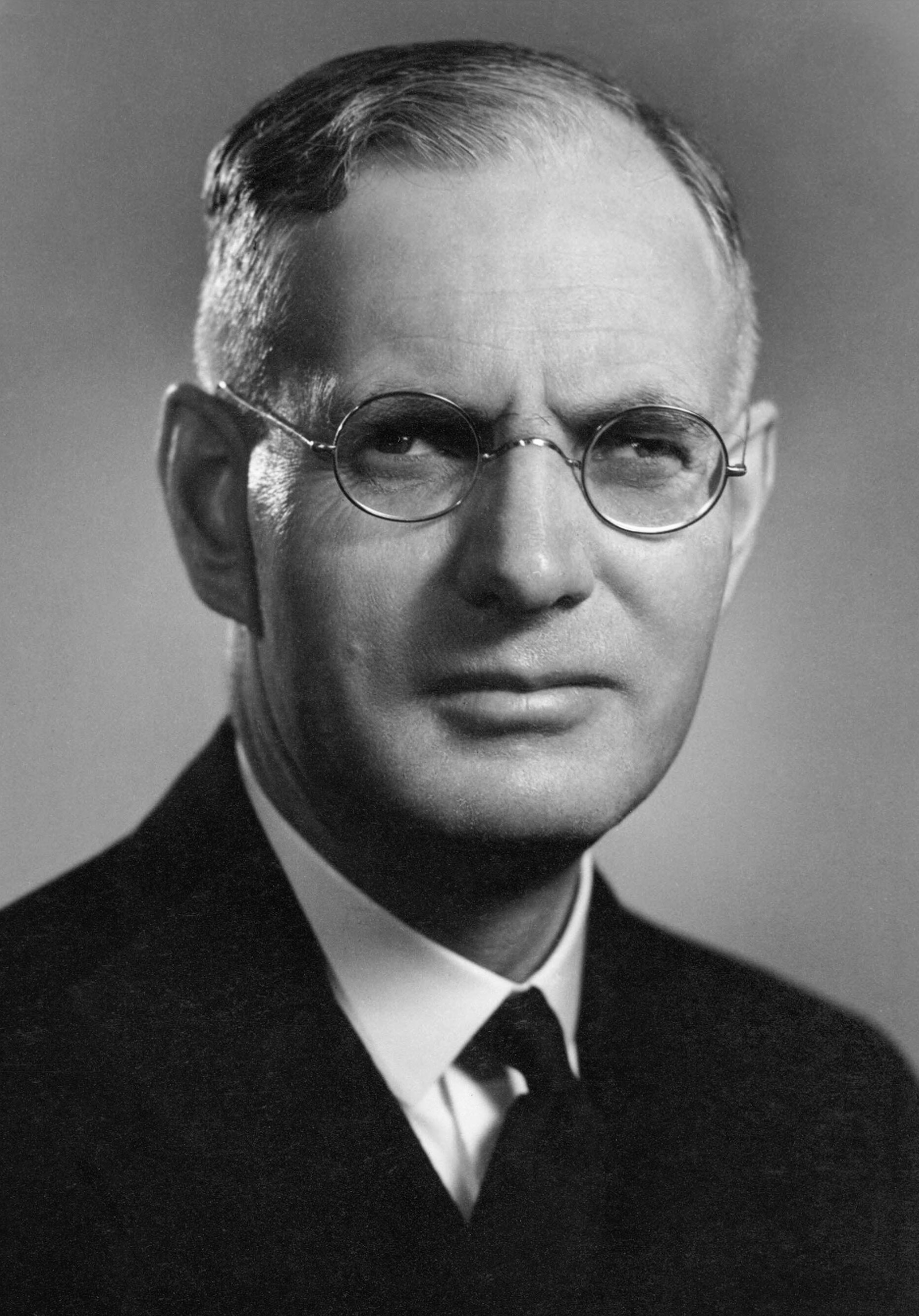
- Official portrait, 1942

14th Prime Minister of Australia
- In office 7 October 1941 – 5 July 1945
- Monarch: George VI
- Governors-General: Lord Gowrie; The Duke of Gloucester
- Deputy: Frank Forde
- Preceded by: Arthur Fadden
- Succeeded by: Frank Forde

Minister for Defence (Note: Curtin's title was Minister for Defence Co-ordination until 21 September 1943, at which point it was changed to simply Minister for Defence.)
- In office 7 October 1941 – 5 July 1945
- Prime Minister: Himself
- Preceded by: Robert Menzies
- Succeeded by: Jack Beasley

7th Leader of the Labor Party
- In office 1 October 1935 – 5 July 1945
- Deputy: Frank Forde
- Preceded by: James Scullin
- Succeeded by: Ben Chifley (Note: Frank Forde acted from 6 July to 13 July 1945.)

Leader of the Opposition
- In office 1 October 1935 – 7 October 1941
- Prime Minister: Joseph Lyons; Earle Page; Robert Menzies; Arthur Fadden
- Deputy: Frank Forde
- Preceded by: James Scullin
- Succeeded by: Arthur Fadden

Member of the Australian Parliament for Fremantle
- In office 15 September 1934 – 5 July 1945
- Preceded by: William Watson
- Succeeded by: Kim Beazley Sr.
- In office 17 November 1928 – 19 December 1931
- Preceded by: William Watson
- Succeeded by: William Watson

Personal details
- Born: John Joseph Ambrose Curtin; 8 January 1885 Creswick, Colony of Victoria
- Died: 5 July 1945 (aged 60) Canberra, Australia
- Resting place: Karrakatta Cemetery
- Party: Labor
- Other political affiliations: Victorian Socialist Party
- Spouse: Elsie Needham (m. 1917)
- Relations: Claude Curtin (nephew)
- Children: 2
- Profession: Politician; trade unionist; journalist

John Curtin (8 January 1885 – 5 July 1945) was the 14th prime minister of Australia, serving from 1941 until his death in 1945. He held office as the leader of the Australian Labor Party (ALP), and is notable for leading the country through the majority of World War II, including all but the last few weeks of the Pacific War.

Curtin left school at the age of 13 and became involved in the labour movement in Melbourne. He joined the Labor Party at a young age and was also involved with the Victorian Socialist Party. He became state secretary of the Timberworkers' Union in 1911 and federal president in 1914. Curtin was a leader of the "No" campaign during the 1916 referendum on overseas conscription, and was briefly jailed for refusing to attend a compulsory medical examination. He moved to Perth the following year to become the editor of the Westralian Worker, and later was state president of the Australian Journalists' Association.

After three unsuccessful attempts, Curtin was elected to the House of Representatives at the 1928 federal election, winning the Division of Fremantle. He is the only prime minister to have represented a constituency in Western Australia. He remained loyal to the Labor government during the party split of 1931. He lost his seat in Labor's landslide defeat at the 1931 election, but won it back in 1934. The following year, Curtin was elected party leader in place of James Scullin, defeating Frank Forde by a single vote. The party gained seats at the 1937 and 1940 elections, with the latter resulting in a hung parliament. The ALP eventually formed a minority government in October 1941, when the Fadden government lost a confidence motion.

The Japanese attacks on British Malaya and Pearl Harbor occurred two months after Curtin became prime minister, and Australia entered the war against Japan. The failure of the British army and navy against Japan and bombing raids on northern Australia created the fear of an imminent Japanese invasion. Curtin realized that only a dependence upon the United States could protect Australia. Curtin led the nation's war effort and made significant decisions about how the war was conducted. He placed Australian forces under the command of the American general Douglas MacArthur, with whom he formed a close relationship. On the home front he successfully negotiated the issue of overseas conscription that had split his party during World War I. The ALP won almost two-thirds of the seats in the House of Representatives at the 1943 election, which remains a party record.

Curtin died in office in July 1945, after months of ill health attributed to the stresses of the war. Many of his post-war reconstruction plans were implemented by his successor Ben Chifley, who in 1946 led the ALP to consecutive victories for the first time. Curtin's leadership skills and personal character were acclaimed by his political contemporaries, and he is frequently ranked as one of Australia's greatest prime ministers and political leaders.

== Early life and education ==
=== Birth and family background ===
Curtin was born in Creswick, Victoria, on 8 January 1885. He was christened "John Joseph Ambrose", although his middle names were not recorded on his birth certificate and he stopped using them in later life. Within his family he was known as "Jack". Curtin was the oldest of four children – his younger brother George was born in 1887, followed by his younger sisters Molly and Hannah in 1889 and 1891. His parents were both born in County Cork, Ireland. His father, John Curtin Sr., had arrived in South Australia in 1873, with two of his brothers. His brothers settled in Adelaide, but he moved on to Victoria and found work as a warder at Pentridge Prison. He later joined the Victoria Police, where in thirteen years he never rose above the rank of a constable; he received reprimands for indecent assault and using excessive force against children. In 1883, he married Catherine Agnes Bourke (known as "Kate"), who had arrived in Melbourne in 1875. She was the sister of one of his police colleagues.

=== Childhood and education ===
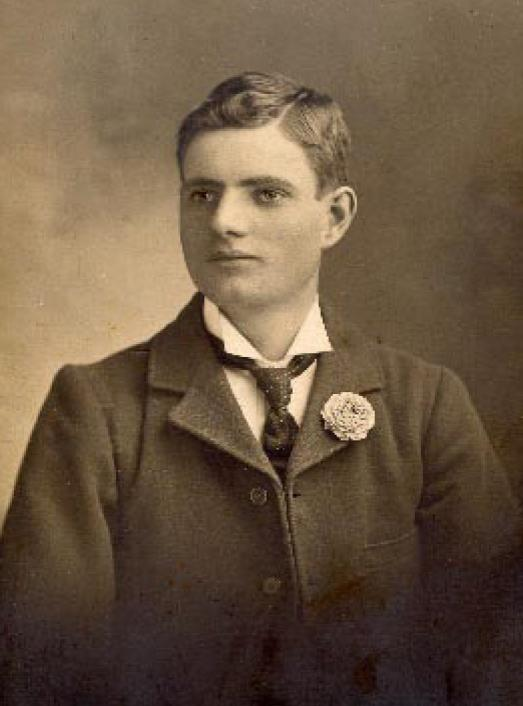
John Curtin in 1908

Curtin was born with congenital strabismus of the left eye, which remained noticeable throughout his life. It was largely a cosmetic defect, but he was quite self-conscious about it. According to his biographer David Day, it had "a considerable psychological effect" on him, and likely exacerbated his natural shyness. Curtin lived in Creswick until 1890, when his father retired from the police. His father suffered from chronic rheumatoid arthritis and syphilis, and was assessed as medically unable to resume his police duties. He was offered a choice between an annual pension and a lump-sum pay-out, and opted for the latter. He subsequently moved his family to inner Melbourne, taking over the lease of a pub on Little Lonsdale Street and moving into rented accommodation in Brunswick.

Curtin began his education at St Francis' Boys School, a Christian Brothers school attached to St Francis' Church. He later briefly attended St Bridget's School in Fitzroy. He also attended Macedon Primary School in Macedon. In 1894, Curtin and his family moved to Charlton, a small country town in north-west Victoria. His father had failed to prosper in Melbourne, which was in the middle of an economic downturn. In Charlton, he took over the lease of a pub owned by his brother-in-law, John Bourke. Curtin was enrolled in the local state school, as a Catholic school had not yet been established. He excelled academically, and was seen as a potential "scholarship boy". (Note: At the time, the Victorian government did not maintain its own system of secondary schools. Children from families who could not afford private school fees could only receive a secondary education if they won a scholarship, usually after ranking highly in a particular examination. A number of writers have compared Curtin's experiences with those of Robert Menzies, who also received his initial schooling at small state schools in country Victoria. Menzies came from a more stable family environment, and by winning a series of scholarships was able to attend an elite private school and eventually study law at the University of Melbourne. In contrast, it is unclear if Curtin was ever given the opportunity to sit a scholarship examination.) However, he and his family left Charlton in 1896. Struggling financially, they spent the following two years moving around country Victoria, as his father managed pubs in Dromana, Drouin, and Mount Macedon. Curtin attended the local state schools, ending his formal education in 1898 at the age of 13.

=== Early working life ===
In early 1899, Curtin began working as an office boy at a weekly magazine called The Rambler, earning five shillings per week. His employer was the artist and writer Norman Lindsay, who had also grown up in Creswick and knew his family. (Note: Norman Lindsay's father, Robert Lindsay, had been the attending doctor at Curtin's birth.) The magazine did not last long, and over the following years Curtin held down a series of short-term jobs, including as a copy boy at The Age, a potter's apprentice, and a houseboy at a gentlemen's club. These were interspersed with periods of unemployment. He did not secure a permanent job until he was 18, taking up a position as an estimates clerk with the Titan Manufacturing Company in South Melbourne in September 1903. By that time he was the family's primary breadwinner, as his father was a virtual invalid.

As a youth, Curtin was a talented sportsman. Between 1903 and 1907, he played as a half-forward flanker for the Brunswick Football Club in the semi-professional Victorian Football Association (VFA). His teammates gave him the nickname "Bumble". His nephew Claude played for Fitzroy in the Victorian Football League (VFL). Curtin also played cricket for the Brunswick Cricket Club, where he had a reputation as a solid batsman. He remained involved in both sports throughout the remainder of his life, as an administrator and supporter. He was said to have an encyclopaedic knowledge of cricket statistics.

=== Political views ===
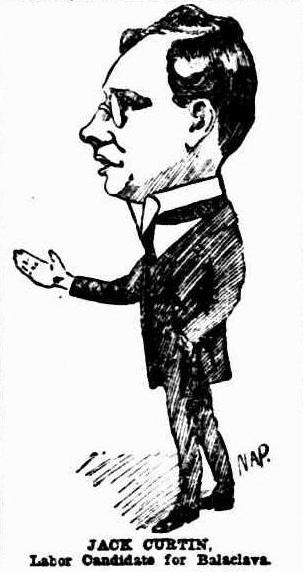
Caricature of Curtin in 1914 (Truth)

From a young age, Curtin was active in both the Australian Labor Party and the Victorian Socialist Party, which was a Marxist organisation. While a member of the Victorian Socialist Party Curtin held strong anti-imperialist and anti-militarist views, and in opposition to the mainstream of the Labor movement, opposed racism due to his belief that racial hatred was used as a tool of the "exploiting class". Labor historian Graeme Osborne describes Curtin's stance as "anticipating Lenin in the view that imperialism was capitalism in its last stage".

He wrote for radical and socialist newspapers. From 1911 until 1915, Curtin was employed as state secretary of the Timberworkers' Union. He was elected federal president of the union in 1914. During World War I he was a militant anti-conscriptionist; he was briefly imprisoned in December 1916 for refusing to attend a compulsory medical examination, even though he knew he would fail the exam due to his very poor eyesight. He also stood (unsuccessfully) as the Labor candidate for Balaclava in the 1914 federal election. The strain of this period led him to drink heavily and regularly, a vice which blighted his career for many years. He proposed to Elsie Needham on St Kilda Beach, and they were married on 21 April 1917 in the dining room of a private home in West Leederville.

Curtin moved to Perth, Western Australia, in 1917 to become an editor for the Westralian Worker, the official trade union newspaper. He settled in the suburb of Cottesloe where his residence is now heritage-listed as "John Curtin's House". He enjoyed the less pressured life of Western Australia and his political views gradually moderated. He joined the Australian Journalists' Association (AJA) in 1917 and was elected its Western Australian President in 1920. He wore his AJA badge (WA membership #56) every day he was prime minister. In addition to his stance on labour rights, Curtin was also a strong advocate for the rights of women and children. In 1927, the Federal Government convened a Royal Commission on Child Endowment, and Curtin was appointed as a member of that commission.

== Early political career ==
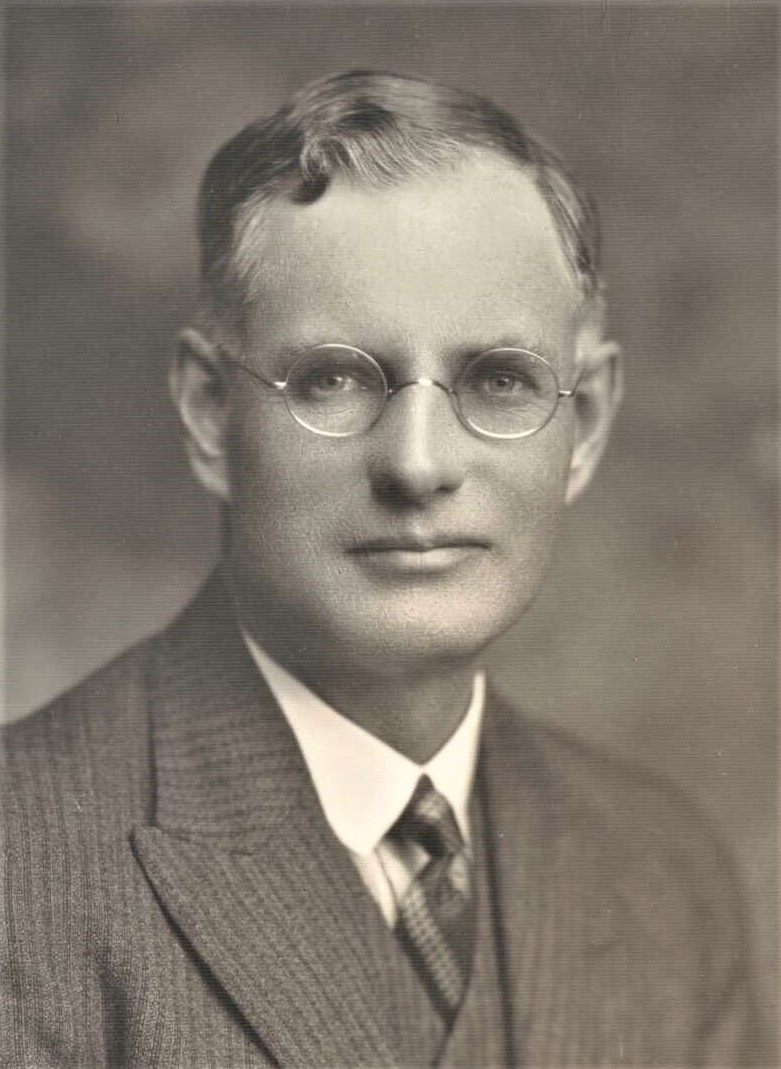
John Curtin in the 1920s

Curtin stood for Parliament a second time in 1925, this time for Fremantle, although he lost heavily to the incumbent William Watson. Watson retired in 1928, and Curtin ran again, this time winning on the second count. Re-elected in Labor's sweeping election victory the following year, he expected to be named as a member of Prime Minister James Scullin's Cabinet, but disapproval of his heavy drinking habit meant that he remained on the backbench. William Watson chose to briefly come out of retirement in 1931, and easily defeated Curtin in an election that saw Labor collapse to just 14 seats in Parliament. After the loss, Curtin became the advocate for the Western Australian Government with the Commonwealth Grants Commission. He stood for his old seat in 1934 after Watson announced his retirement for the second time, and was able to win it back.

=== Leader of the Opposition ===
In 1935, when Scullin resigned as Labor Leader, Curtin stood in the election to replace him, although he was not expected to win. His opponent was Frank Forde, the deputy leader of the party since 1931 who had been closely associated with the economic policies of the Scullin government. This led left wing factions and trade unions to support Curtin, in an attempt to block Forde from getting the leadership. With their support, Curtin was able to defeat Forde by just one vote to become Leader of the Labor Party and Leader of the Opposition. The groups that had supported Curtin did so on the basis that he promise to give up alcohol, which he subsequently did. Although Labor made little progress at the 1937 election, by 1939 Labor's position had vastly improved. Curtin led Labor to a five-seat swing in the 1940 election, which resulted in a hung parliament. In that election, Curtin's own seat of Fremantle had been in doubt. United Australia Party challenger Frederick Lee appeared to have won the seat on the second count after most of independent Guildford Clarke's preferences flowed to him, and it was not until the final counting of preferential votes that Curtin knew he had won the seat.

In September 1939, the Second World War commenced when Nazi Germany invaded Poland. In line with the king's declaration of war, Prime Minister Robert Menzies declared war on Germany and announced Australia's support for the British war effort. In 1941, Menzies travelled to Britain to discuss Australia's role in the war strategy, and to express concern at the reliability of Singapore's defences, only to be drawn into Winston Churchill's disastrous Greek campaign. While he was in Britain, Menzies lost the support of his own party, and was forced to resign as prime minister. The Coalition elected Arthur Fadden, the leader of the Country Party, as Menzies' replacement, even though the UAP was the senior partner in the Coalition. Curtin adroitly refused calls from his own caucus to bring about the defeat of the government through a motion of no confidence.

== Prime minister ==
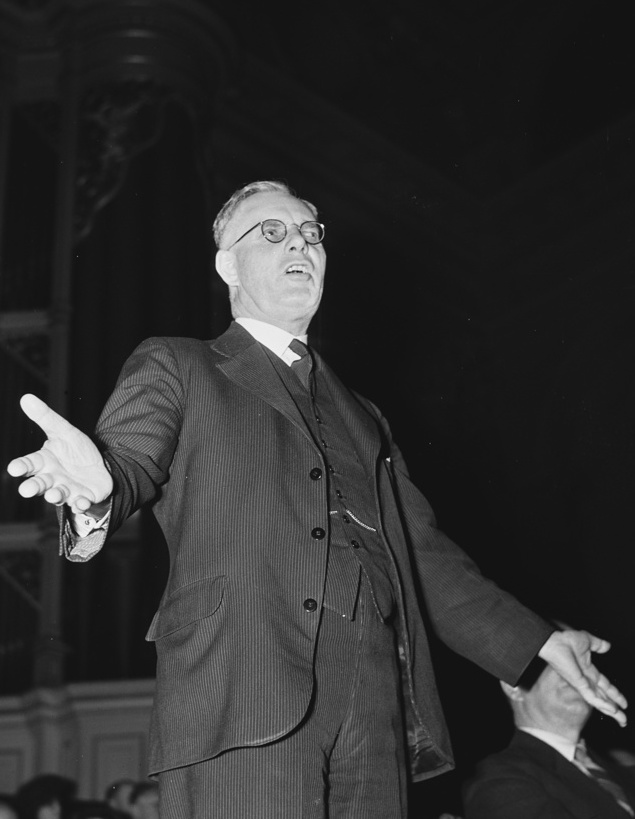
John Curtin giving his austerity speech at Sydney Town Hall, October 1942

Curtin had refused Menzies' initial offer to form a wartime "national government", partly because he feared that it would split the Labor Party, although he did agree to join the Advisory War Council. In October 1941, Arthur Coles and Alexander Wilson, the two independent MPs who had been keeping the Coalition in office since 1940 (first under Menzies, then under Fadden), joined forces with Labor in defeating Fadden's budget and bringing the government down. Governor-General Lord Gowrie was reluctant to call an election for a Parliament barely a year old, especially given the international situation. He summoned Coles and Wilson and made them promise that if he named Curtin prime minister, they would support him for the remainder of the Parliament to end the instability in government. The independents agreed, and Curtin was sworn in as prime minister on 7 October, aged 56. He became the first and only prime minister to come from Western Australia.

=== War in the Pacific ===
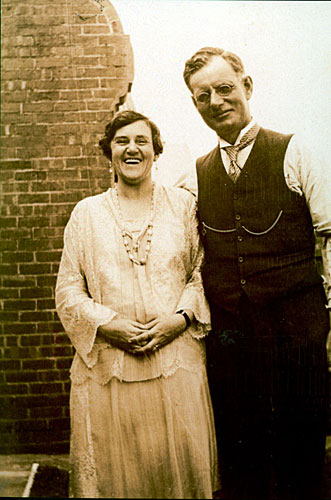
John Curtin and his wife Elsie (née Needham)

On 8 December 1941, the Pacific War broke out when Japan bombed Pearl Harbor. Curtin addressed the nation on the radio, saying, "Men and women of Australia...we are at war with Japan. This is the gravest hour of our history. We Australians have imperishable traditions. We shall maintain them. We shall vindicate them. We shall hold this country and keep it as a citadel for the British-speaking race and as a place where civilisation will persist." On 10 December, HMS Prince of Wales and HMS Repulse were both sunk by Japanese bombers off the Malayan coast. Curtin cabled the President of the United States, Franklin D. Roosevelt, and Churchill on 23 December, saying, "The fall of Singapore would mean the isolation of the Philippines, the fall of the Netherlands East Indies and attempts to smother all other bases. It is in your power to meet the situation... we would gladly accept United States commanders in the Pacific area. Please consider this as a matter of urgency."

Curtin made crucial decisions linking Australia to the United States. On 28 December, the Sydney Daily Telegraph published a public statement of his government's new attitude:

We look for a solid and impregnable barrier of the Democracies against the three Axis powers, and we refuse to accept the dictum that the Pacific struggle must be treated as a subordinate segment of the general conflict. By that it is not meant that any one of the other theatres of war is of less importance than the Pacific, but that Australia asks for a concerted plan evoking the greatest strength at the Democracies' disposal, determined upon hurling Japan back. The Australian Government, therefore regards the Pacific struggle as primarily one in which the United States and Australia must have the fullest say in the direction of the Democracies' fighting plan. Without any inhibitions of any kind, I make it clear that Australia looks to America, free of any pangs as to our traditional links or kinship with the United Kingdom. We know the problems that the United Kingdom faces. We know the dangers of dispersal of strength, but we know too, that Australia can go and Britain can still hold on. We are, therefore, determined that Australia shall not go, and we shall exert all our energies towards the shaping of a plan, with the United States as its keystone, which will give to our country some confidence of being able to hold out until the tide of battle swings against the enemy.

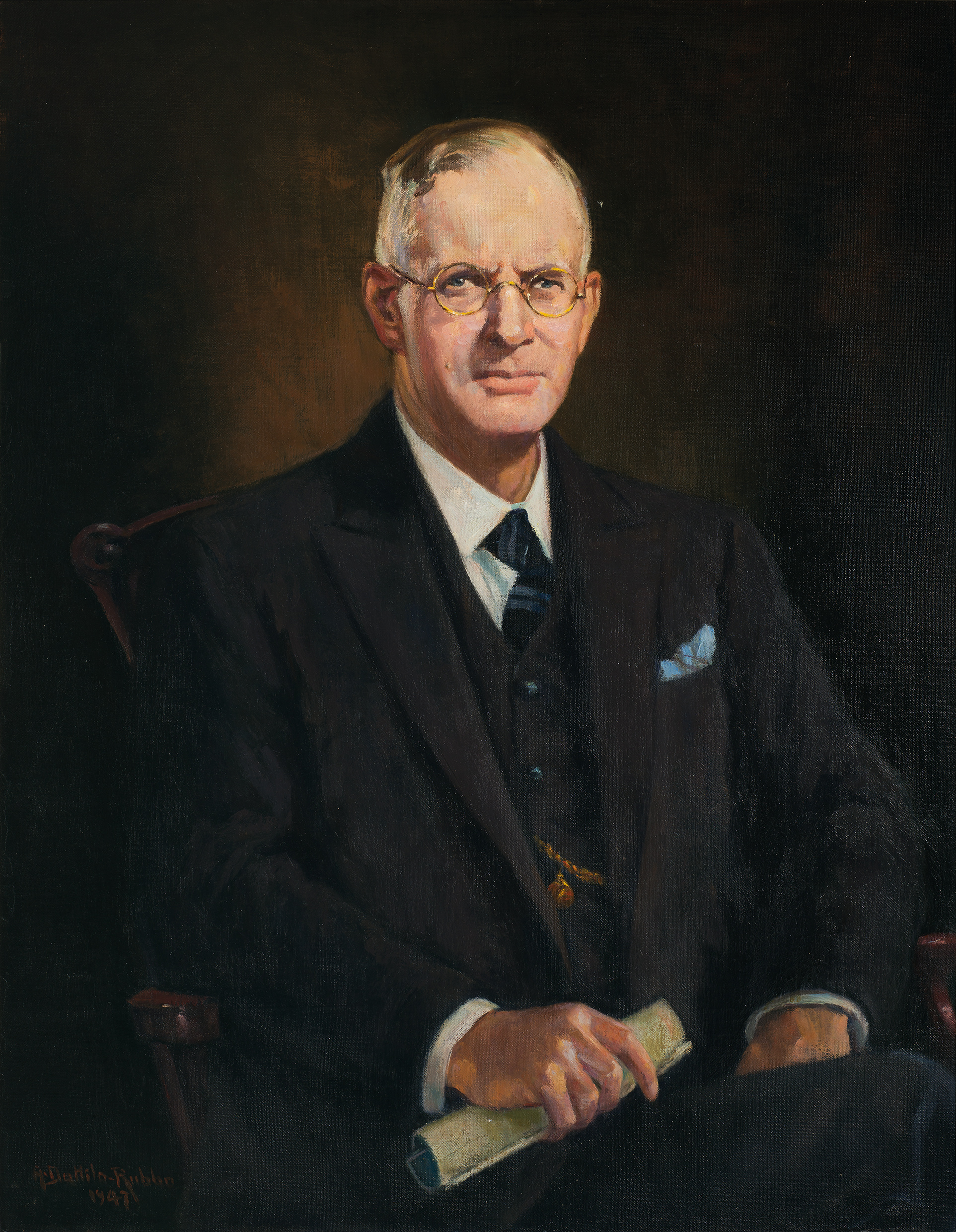
Parliament House portrait of Curtin by Anthony Dattilo Rubbo, 1947

This speech was one of the most important in Australia's history, marking a turning point in Australia's relationship with its founding country, the United Kingdom. Many felt that Prime Minister Curtin was abandoning Australia's traditional ties to the British Isles without any solid partnership in place with the United States. This speech also received criticism at high levels of government in Australia, Britain and the US; it angered Churchill, and Roosevelt said that it "smacked of panic". The speech nevertheless achieved the effect of drawing attention to the possibility that Australia would be invaded by Japan. Before this speech, the Australian response to the war effort had been troubled by attitudes swinging from "she'll be right" to gossip-driven panic. By 1943, when the threat of Japanese invasion had passed, Curtin increasingly returned to a commitment to the British Empire. Downplaying nationalism, he said that Australia comprised "seven million Britishers". He saw the United States as a predatory economic and military power that would threaten Australia's own ambitions in the Pacific. Australia moved closer to New Zealand, and suggested a lesser role for the United States after the war. Washington was annoyed.

Concurrently, the Curtin government enacted the Statute of Westminster Adoption Act 1942, under which Australia accepted the dominion status which Britain had conferred in 1930, but which the Australian federal government had not accepted until then. The Adoption Act took effect retroactively as of 3 September 1939, the outbreak of World War II. Although politically a product of the government's policy of re-orientation towards the United States, constitutionally, this marked the moment that Australia became an independent nation with a separate Crown, no longer subject to the supremacy of British law and the British Crown.

=== Military policies ===
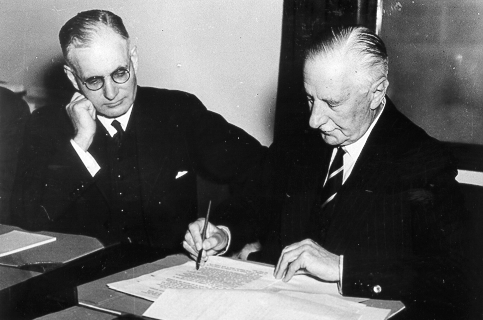
The Governor-General The Earl Gowrie signs the declaration of war against Japan, with Curtin looking on.

The Curtin government agreed that the Australian Army's I Corps – centred on the 6th and 7th Divisions – would be transferred from North Africa to the American-British-Dutch-Australian Command in the Netherlands East Indies for the defence of Java and Sumatra. Before they could arrive, Singapore fell on 15 February 1942. Most of the 8th Division was taken into captivity, although a small number, including its commander, Major General Gordon Bennett, managed to escape. "The fall of Singapore", Curtin announced in a radio address to the nation on 16 February, "can only be described as Australia's Dunkirk. It will be recalled that the fall of Dunkirk initiated the Battle for Britain. The fall of Singapore opens the Battle for Australia. On its issue depends not merely the fate of this Commonwealth but the frontier of the United States of America and, indeed, all the Americas and, therefore, in a large measure the fate of the British-speaking world."

The Japanese threat was further underlined on 19 February, when Japan bombed Darwin, the first of many air raids on northern Australia. Churchill attempted to divert I Corps to reinforce British troops in Burma, without Australian approval. Curtin insisted that it return to Australia. Roosevelt supported Churchill, offering to send an American division to Australia instead, while the Chief of the Australian General Staff, Lieutenant General Vernon Sturdee, threatened to resign if his advice was ignored and the troops were diverted to Burma. Curtin prevailed, although he agreed that the main body of the 6th Division could garrison Ceylon.

In the 1943 Australian federal election campaign the following year, Curtin was forced to publicly defend his decision. "Had we held Rangoon, or had we even held the district, of Akyab", media magnate Keith Murdoch wrote in an editorial on 13 August 1943, "we would have held the door to the vast manpower of China and the jumping-off fields for the devastation of Japanese cities. Multitudes of the finest lives of Australia, Britain, and America would have been saved; the long years of toil, death, and separation, which assuredly stretch ahead, would have been shortened."

Curtin formed a close working relationship with the Allied Supreme Commander in the South West Pacific Area, General Douglas MacArthur. Curtin realised that Australia would be ignored unless it had a strong voice in Washington, D.C., and he wanted that voice to be MacArthur's. He gave over control of Australian forces to MacArthur, directing Australian commanders to treat MacArthur's orders as if they came from the Australian Government. Biographer John Edwards wrote:

A lesser Australian leader might have grated against MacArthur's vanity, cavilled at his assumption of command, contradicted his grandiloquent claims, satirised his manner. Curtin did not. He seized the chance to share authority with MacArthur, refused to offend his vanity, drew him as close as he could. Of Curtin's military decisions, it was the cleverest, most fruitful, most abidingly successful.

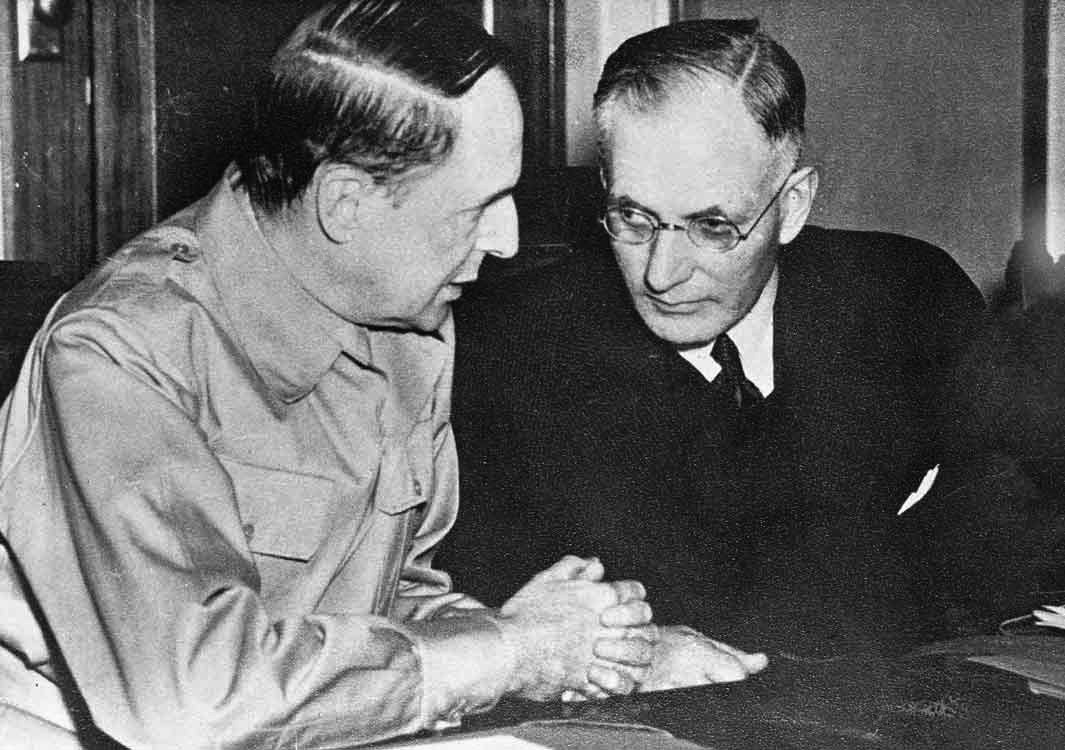
Curtin with Douglas MacArthur

By mid-1942, the results of the battles of the Coral Sea and Midway had averted the perceived threat of invasion. Despite the "beat Germany first" policy, 346,000 Americans were fighting in the Pacific in 1942. Curtin had previously opposed conscription for overseas service during World War I, and again in 1940 when it was introduced by Menzies, although he had supported softening it to allow conscripts to serve in Australian territories.

Curtin recognised that the restriction of the Australian conscripts to Australia and its territories was morally indefensible and politically unviable. To remove what was now a major obstacle to the government's re-election prospects, he moved to remove the restriction. While there was support from the Communist Party of Australia and its sympathisers, there was trenchant opposition from the Catholic Church, represented by B. A. Santamaria and Arthur Calwell. Ultimately, the Defence Act was amended so that conscripts could be deployed outside of Australia to "such other territories in the South-West Pacific Area as the Governor-General proclaims as being territories associated with the defence of Australia".

The stress of the war and especially this bitter internal battle within Labor took a great toll on Curtin's health, which had never been robust even at the best of times. He had suffered all of his life from stress-related illnesses, and depression; he was also a heavy smoker.

=== Homefront policies ===
Curtin made very heavy use of newspapers and broadcast media, especially through press conferences, speeches, and newsreels. Australians gained a sense it was a people's war in which they were full participants.

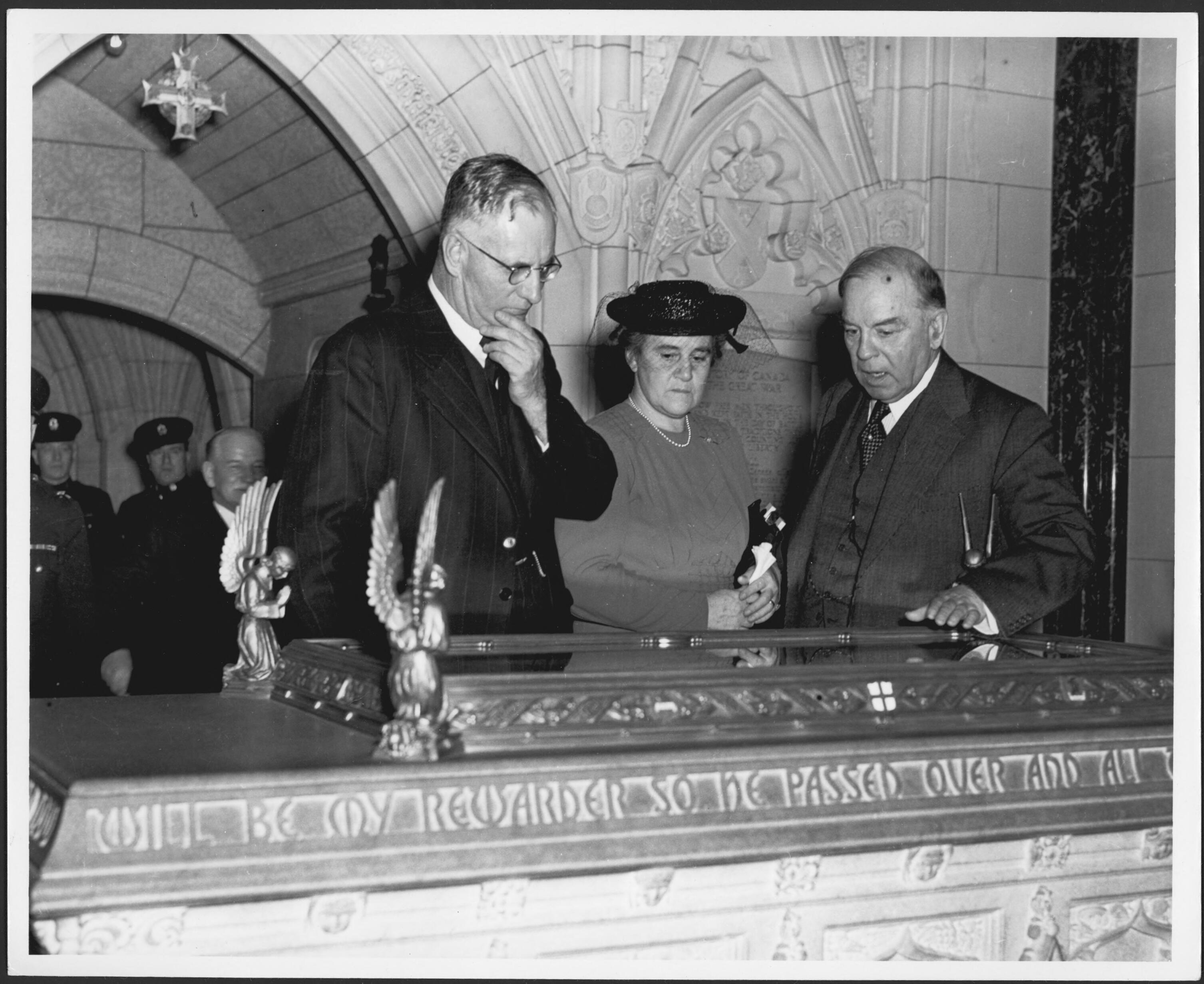
Mackenzie King, the Prime Minister of Canada, hosting Prime Minister John Curtin of Australia and his wife Elsie at the Peace Tower in Ottawa.

In terms of social policy, the Curtin government enacted a wide range of progressive social reforms during its time in office. Pensions were introduced for deserted wives and widows, while the establishment of the Women's Employment Board led to increased wages for some women during the war. Aboriginal Australians were provided with significantly increased entitlement to welfare benefits, while maternity allowances were extended. In addition, pensions for the elderly and infirm were increased.

In 1942, temporary public employees became eligible to apply to join the Commonwealth superannuation scheme if they had been employed for no less than five years and were certified as having indefinite future employment, while the Commonwealth Employees' Furlough Act of 1943 provided long service leave for all temporary Commonwealth employees. In 1943, the Universities Commission was established to exempt students from war service to undertake or continue university studies and to assist those students by exempting them from fees and, subject to a means test, by providing them with living allowances.

"Asiatics" who were subjects of Australia became eligible for a pension in 1941, and eligibility was extended the following year to Pacific Islanders known as "Kanakas", and from that July that year "Aboriginal natives" of Australia became eligible for pensions if they were not subject to a state law "relating to the control of Aboriginal natives" or if they lived in a state where they could not be exempt from such laws but were of eligible for pension on the grounds of "character, standard of intelligence and development". That same year, pension became exempt from income tax. In 1943, funeral benefits were introduced, together with a Wife's Allowance for wives of incapacitated age pensioners "where she lived with him, was his legal wife and did not receive a pension in her own right".

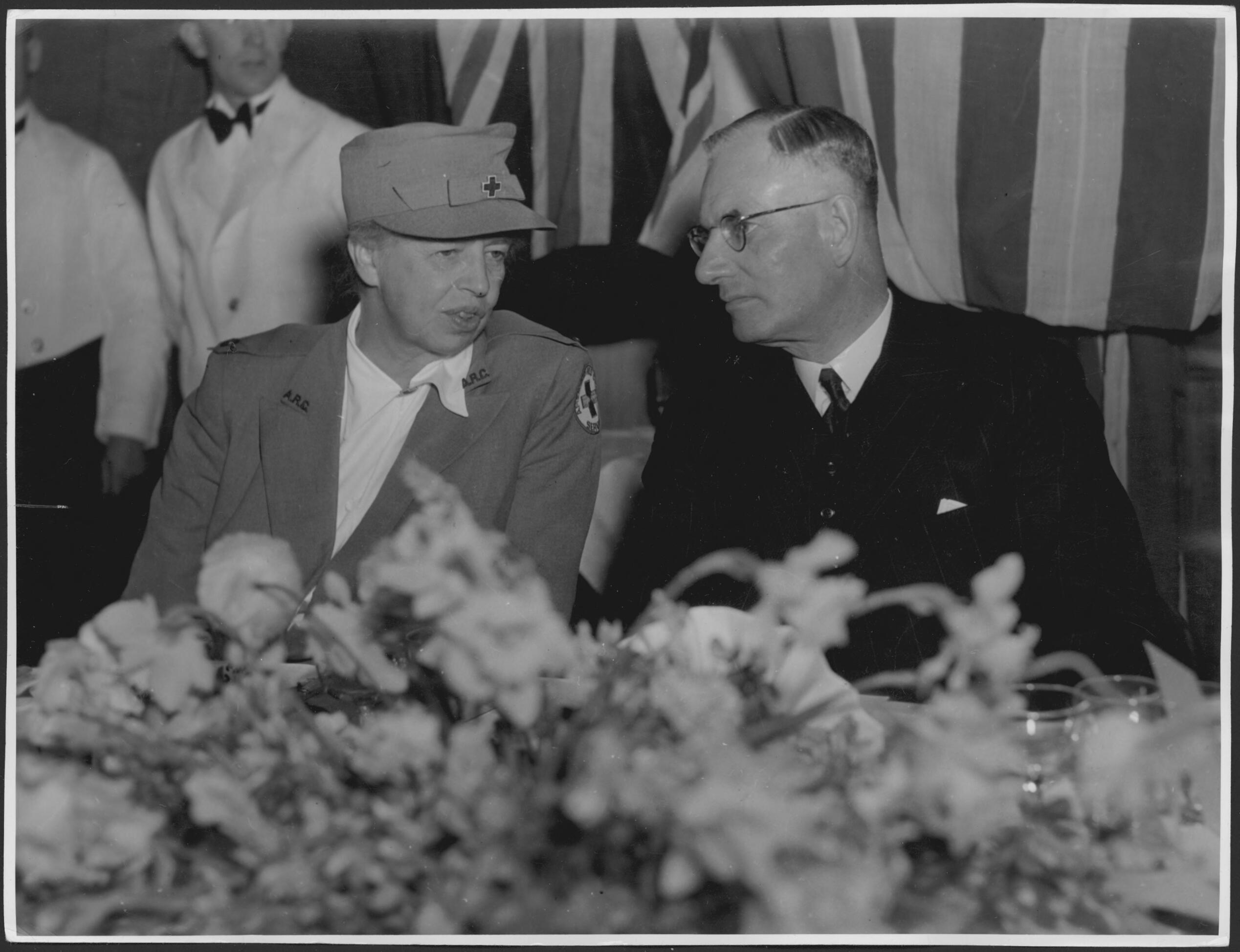
Eleanor Roosevelt, First Lady of the United States, with Curtin at a state luncheon in her honour at Old Parliament House, Canberra, in September 1943

From June 1942, Widows' Pension Class B was paid to widows without dependent children who were aged 50 and over. The term "widow" included de facto widows who had lived with the deceased spouse for at least three years prior to his death and had been maintained by him. Eligibility was also extended to deserted de jure wives who had been deserted for at least six months, divorced women who had not remarried and women whose husbands were in hospitals for those considered to be insane. From July that year, Widows' Pension Class B was exempted from income tax.

In 1942, eligibility for maternity allowances was extended to Aboriginal women who were exempted from State laws relating to the control of Aboriginal natives and who were considered suitable to receive the benefits. From 1943, the income test for maternity allowances was abolished and the rate of the allowance was increased to 15 pounds where there were no other children under the age of 14 years, 16 pounds where there were one or two other children, and 17 pounds 10 shillings in cases of three or more children. These amounts included an additional allowance of 25 shillings per week in respect of the period four weeks before and four weeks after the birth, to be paid after the birth of the child. That same year, eligibility for Child Endowment was extended to children in Government institutions, to Aboriginal children who lived for six months per year on a mission station, and to children who were maintained from a deceased estate.

The Child's Allowance was introduced in 1943, payable at the rate of five shillings per week for a first for an unendowed child under 16 years dependent on an invalid or permanently incapacitated old-age pensioner. From July 1945 onwards, Additional Benefit for Children of five shillings per week became payable in respect of the first child to any person qualified to receive unemployment or sickness benefit having the custody, care and control of one or more children under the age of 16.

In 1945, Curtin ordered the preparation of the White Paper on Full Employment in Australia. The White Paper was the defining document of the official economic policy in Australia until the 1970s. For the first time, the Australian government accepted an obligation to guarantee full employment and to intervene as necessary to implement that guarantee.

=== 1943 re-election ===
Curtin went into the 1943 election in a very strong position. Even allowing for the advantages that an incumbent government has in wartime, Fadden and Hughes had been unable to get the better of Curtin, and the Coalition had become almost moribund. In the election, Curtin led Labor to its greatest-ever victory, winning two-thirds of the seats in the House of Representatives on a two-party preferred vote of 58.2% and a 17-seat swing. The Coalition was reduced to only 19 seats nationwide, including only one west of Broken Hill. Fadden's Country Party took a particularly severe beating, winning only seven seats. Labor also won the primary vote in all states in the Senate, and thus all 19 seats, to hold a majority of 22 out of 36 seats.

Buoyed by this success, Curtin called a referendum which would give the government control of the economy and resources for five years after the war was over. The 1944 Australian Referendum contained one referendum question: "Do you approve of the proposed law for the alteration of the Constitution entitled 'Constitution Alteration (Post-War Reconstruction and Democratic Rights) 1944'?" Constitution Alteration (Post-War Reconstruction and Democratic Rights) 1944 was known as the 14 powers, or 14 points referendum. It sought to give the government power, over a period of five years, to legislate on monopolies, corporations, trusts, national health, family allowances, freedom of speech, religion, ex-servicemen rehabilitation, the ability to legislate for Indigenous Australians, and safeguards against the abuse of legislative power. The referendum was defeated, receiving a majority only in Western Australia and South Australia. Nationally overall, 54 percent voted against the question in the referendum.

== Death ==
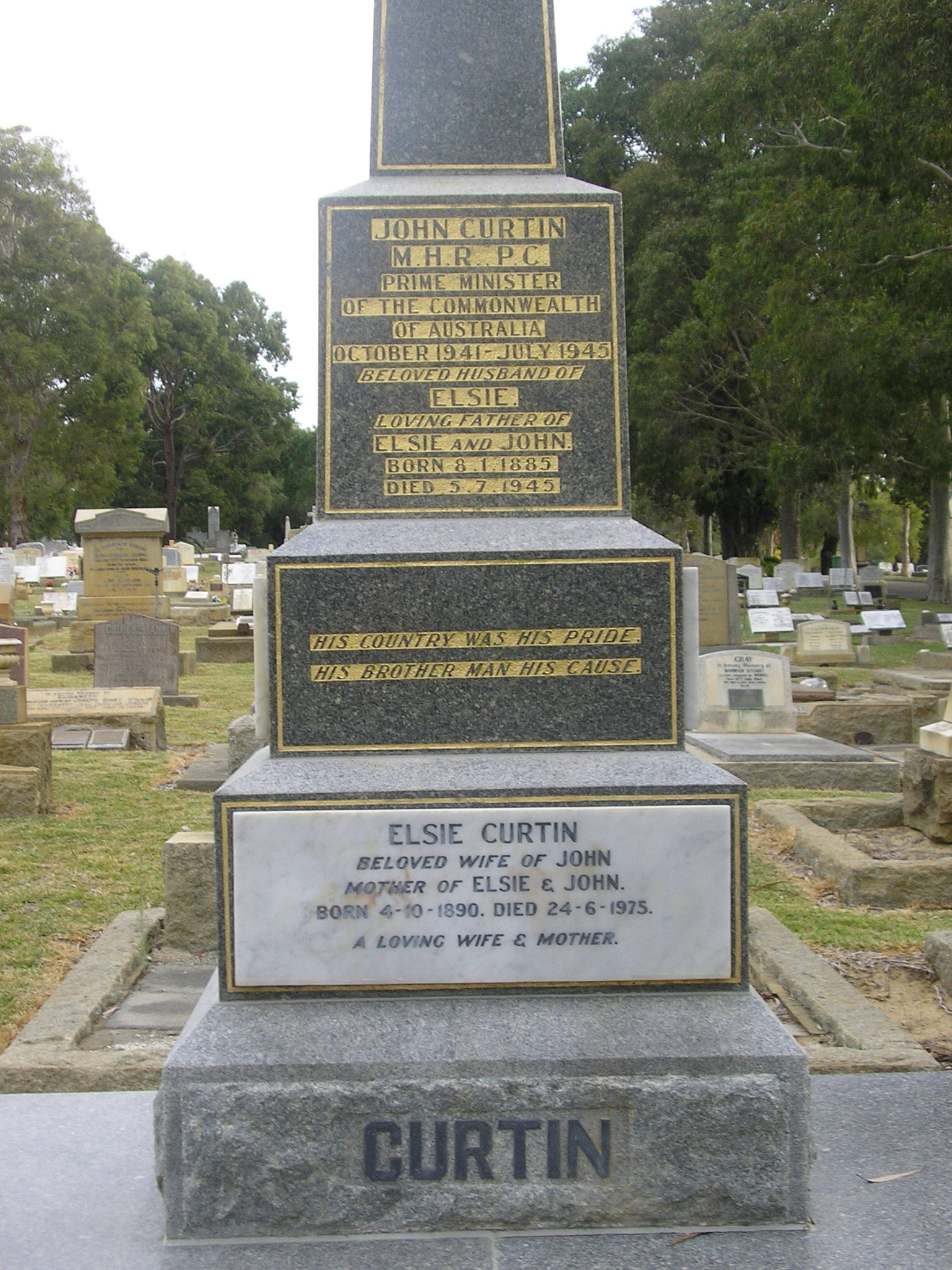
John and Elsie Curtin's grave at Karrakatta Cemetery

By 1944—a time when he was travelling to and from London and Washington for meetings with Churchill, Roosevelt and other Allied leaders—Curtin had already developed heart disease. He had a heart attack in November 1944, and did not return to work until January 1945. With the end of the war in sight, his health began to deteriorate seriously and at a rapid pace.

At 4:00 am on 5 July 1945, as Australia's 7th Division began its last operation against Japanese forces in the Battle of Balikpapan, John Curtin died at The Lodge at the age of 60. He was the second Australian prime minister to die in office within six years, a fact even contemporary commentators ascribed to the extreme stressors such an office demanded. Upon his death he was described by beacons of the local press to be a self-sacrificial casualty of war, a sentiment echoed by Presbyterian minister Hector Harrison. The next day, Curtin's body was laid in state at the King's Hall in Parliament House, where a memorial service was held, conducted by Harrison, who had been one of Curtin's friends. Ben Chifley and Enid Lyons were seen to weep openly.

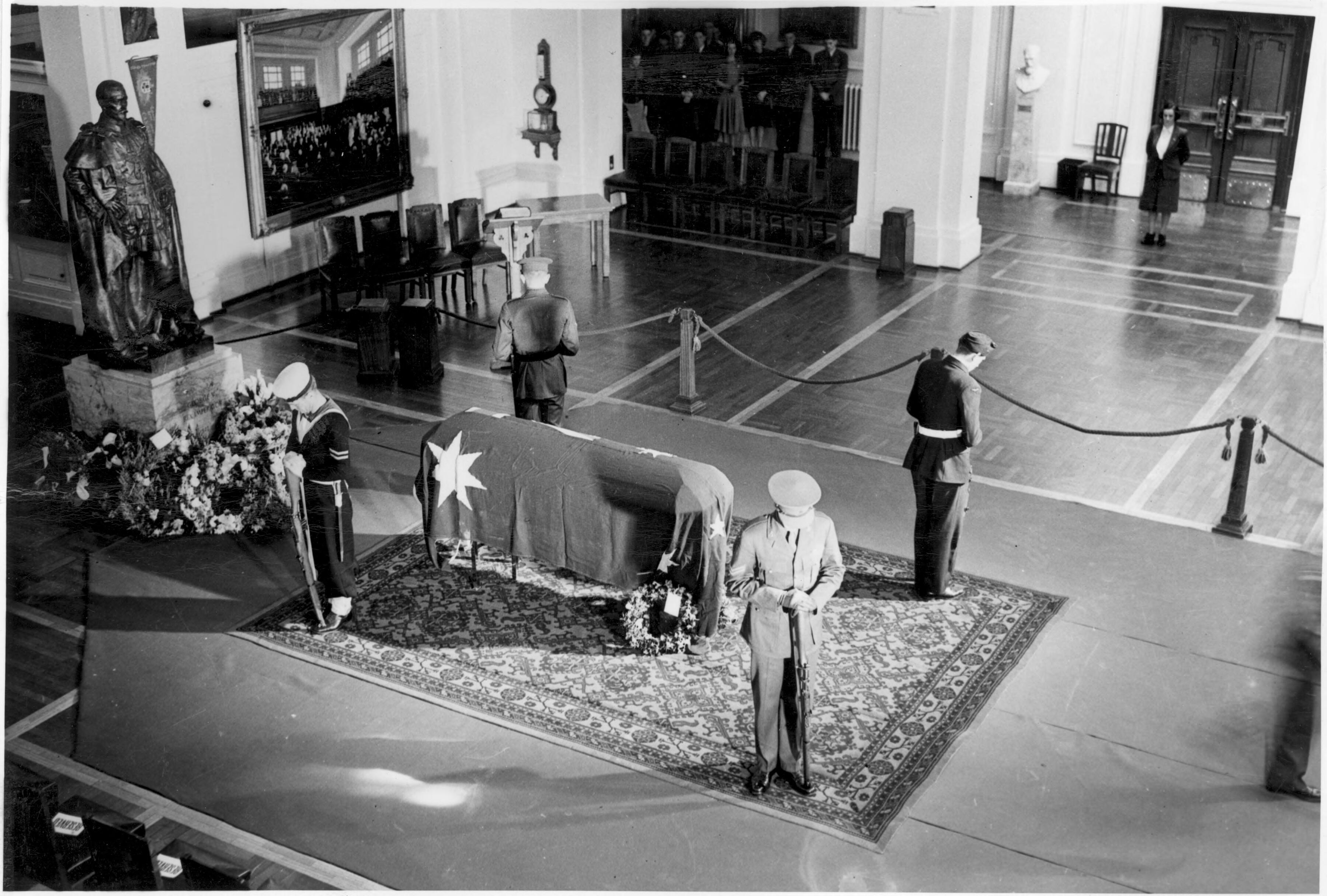
John Curtin's coffin lying in state in Parliament House, July 1945

Harrison seemed to include Curtin among the Australian servicemen who had made the ultimate sacrifice:

"His Calvary was the anguish of a man of peace who loathed war with all his heart and soul. A one who spent his life in an attempt to promote human understanding, and journeyed oft in that attempt. And yet who, by a strange irony of fate, was chosen by destiny to lead the nation in her hour of direst peril... when the hosts of the North came down like a mighty flood, confident in strength and exalted in victory, he did not shrink from the hazards of the conflict but threw himself into his work with an utter devotion which at length laid him low and at last called for the supreme sacrifice. We pay him today the homage of a grateful people as one whose name will live forever more in the land he loved and among the free peoples of the world.

Bearing his coffin from the King's Hall were Opposition Leader Robert Menzies, and former prime ministers Billy Hughes, Earle Page and James Scullin. His body was returned to Perth on a RAAF Dakota escorted by a flight of nine fighter aircraft. After lying in state, he was buried at Karrakatta Cemetery in Perth; the service was attended by over 30,000 at the cemetery, with many more lining the streets.

Curtin was initially succeeded as prime minister by his deputy, Frank Forde; seven days later, a party ballot installed Ben Chifley as Labor Leader and therefore prime minister. Many of Curtin's post-war reconstruction plans were implemented by his successor Chifley, who in 1946 led the ALP to consecutive victories for the first time. Curtin's 9 years and 277 days as leader of the federal ALP would remain a record until it was surpassed by Gough Whitlam in 1975.

== Personal life ==
Curtin was introduced to Elsie Needham on a visit to Tasmania in April 1912. Fred Katz, an acquaintance from the Victorian Socialist Party, had taken Curtin to visit Elsie's father Abraham Needham, a candidate in the 1912 Tasmanian state election. Curtin proposed to her in Melbourne in 1915, and they were married in Perth on 21 April 1917. Their first child, a daughter also named Elsie, was born at the end of that year. Their second child, a son named John, was born in 1921.

Curtin had an ambivalent relationship with religion and has been described as agnostic. A Catholic priest called at The Lodge as Curtin lay dying, but he was turned away. Curtin had refused to so much as set foot inside a Catholic church throughout his adult life, not even to attend the weddings of friends. However, he was known to ask his press secretary, Fred McLaughlin, to join him in prayer while prime minister. On the day that Singapore fell, Curtin made time to speak at the re-consecration of a church, because, "The fatherhood of God was closely related to the brotherhood of man." Near the end of his life, he asked his friend Hector Harrison, the Minister of the Presbyterian Church by Parliament, to conduct a Christian memorial service on his death. Kim Beazley Sr., who succeeded Curtin as the Member for Fremantle, did not believe Curtin was agnostic at all, saying, "though Curtin never lost his distrust of religious institutions, faith grew within him."

== Legacy ==
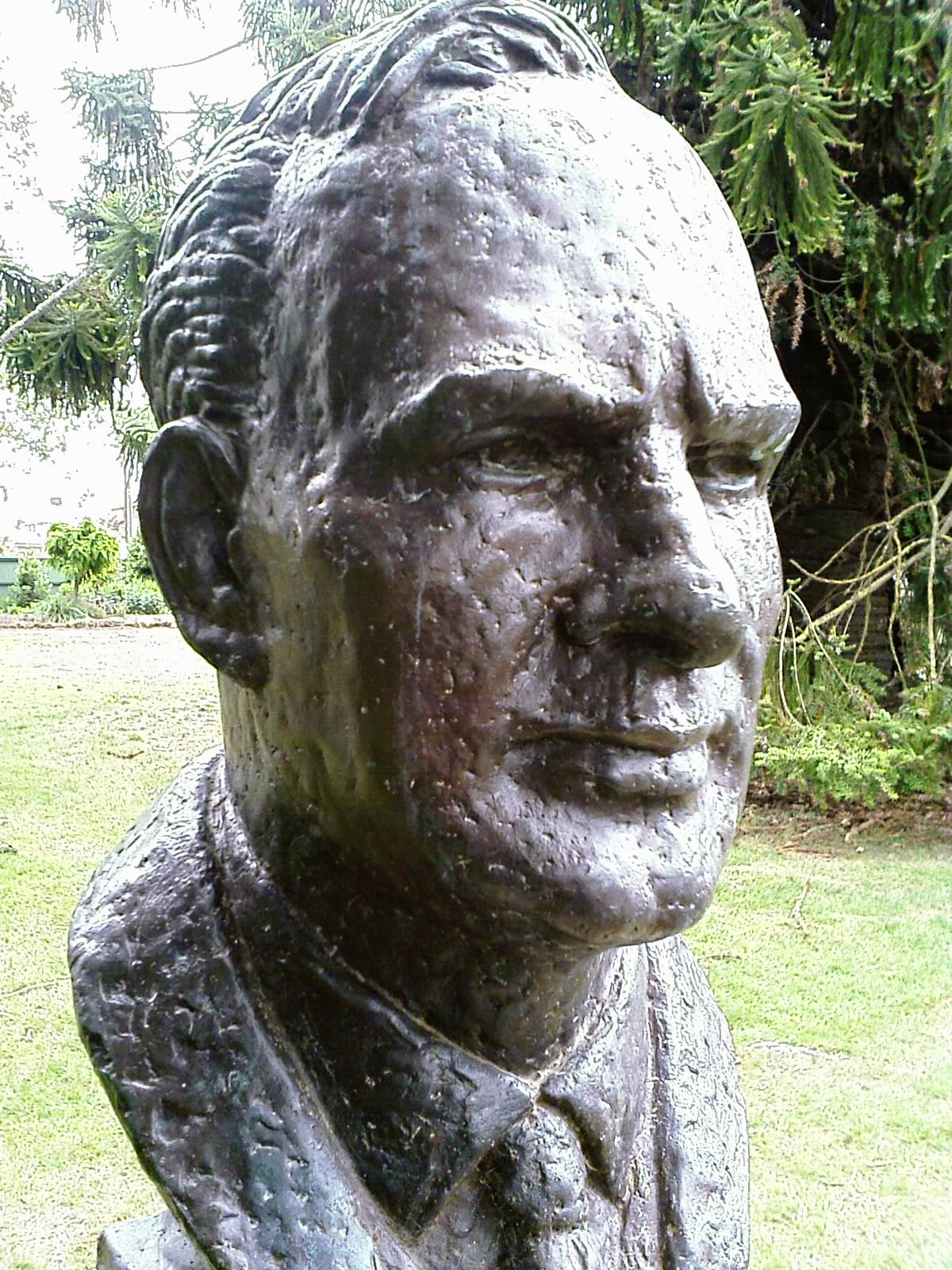
Bust of Curtin by Wallace Anderson in the Prime Ministers Avenue in the Ballarat Botanical Gardens

In a combined survey of political scientists and historians of all Australian prime ministers, Curtin was ranked number one in both 2010 and 2020 surveys.

Jack Beadly said of Curtin that "he was one of the greatest of wartime statesmen, and the preservation of Australia from invasion will be his immemorial monument". Curtin is credited with leading the Labor Party to its best federal election success in history, with a record 55.1 percent of the primary half-senate vote, winning all seats, and a two-party-preferred lower house estimate of 58.2 percent at the 1943 election, winning two-thirds of seats.

One legacy of Curtin was the significant expansion of social services under his leadership. In 1942, uniform taxation was imposed on the various states, which enabled the Curtin government to set up a far-reaching, federally administered range of social services. These included a widows' pension (1942), maternity benefits for Indigenous Australians (1942), funeral benefits (1943), a second form of maternity benefit (1943), a wife's allowance (1943), additional allowances for the children of pensioners (1943), unemployment, sickness and Special Benefits (1945), and pharmaceutical benefits (1945). Substantial improvements to pensions were made, with invalidity and old-age pensions increased, the qualifying period of residence for age pensions halved, and the means test liberalised. Other social security benefits were significantly increased, while child endowment was liberalised, a scheme of vocational training for invalid pensioners was set up, and pensions extended to cover Aboriginal Peoples. The expansion of social security under John Curtin was of such significance that, as summed up by one historian: "Australia entered World War II with only a fragmentary welfare provision: by the end of the war it had constructed a 'welfare state'."

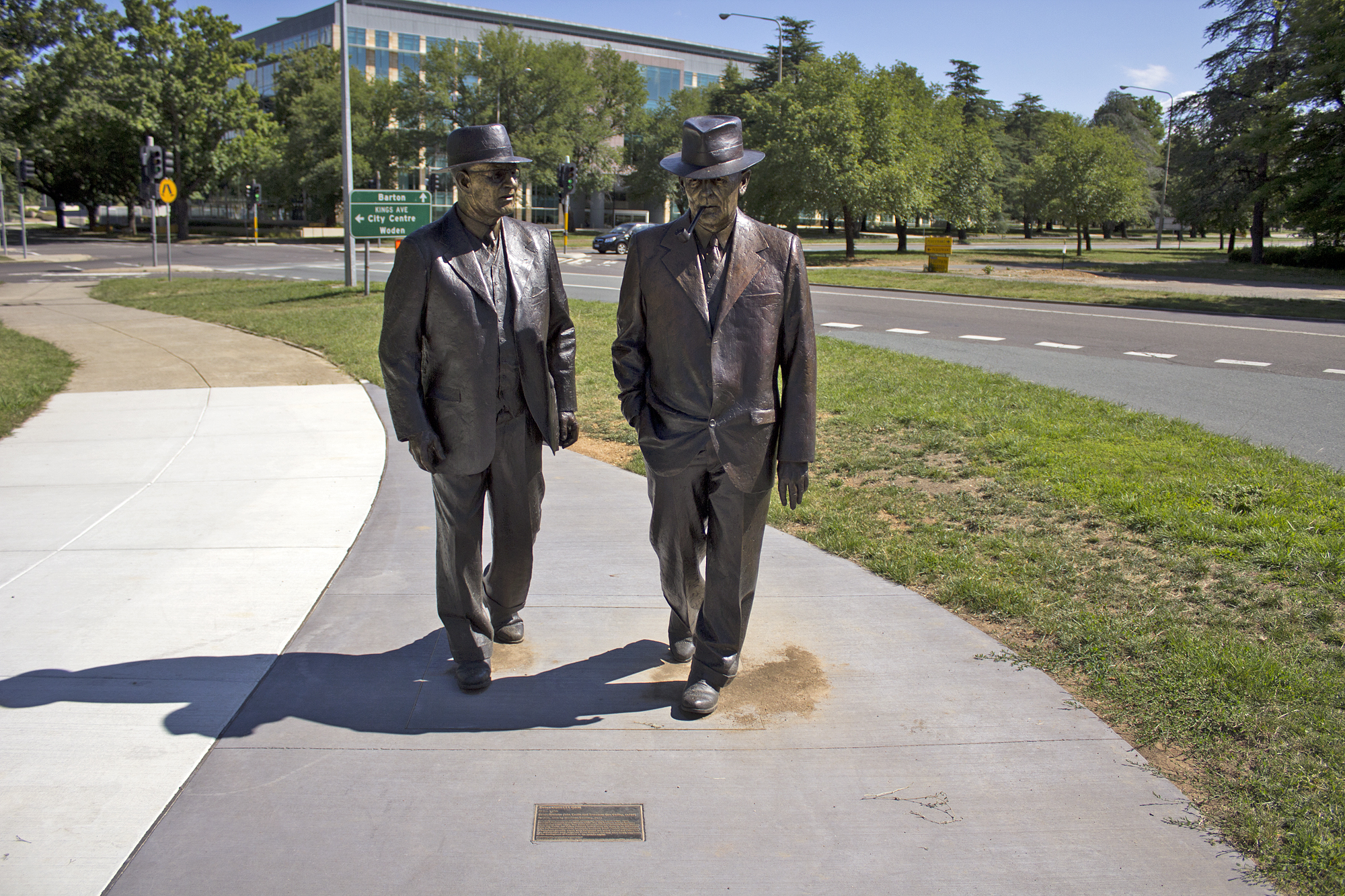
Statues of Curtin (left) and his treasurer, Ben Chifley, in Canberra

Curtin defended the White Australia policy in a speech in which he stated: "This country shall remain forever the home of the descendants of those people who came here in peace in order to establish in the South Seas an outpost of the British race." The Curtin government's October 1942 enactment of the Statute of Westminster Adoption Act 1942, reversing the stance of four previous governments, marked Australian legal independence. This law, along with the Constitution of Australia and the Australia Act 1986, is one of the key components of Australia's modern constitutional framework.

His early death and the sentiments it aroused have given Curtin a unique place in Australian political history. Successive Labor leaders, particularly Bob Hawke and Kim Beazley, have sought to build on the Curtin tradition of "patriotic Laborism". Even some political conservatives pay at least formal homage to the Curtin legend. Immediately after his death, the parliament agreed to pay John Curtin's wife Elsie a £1,000 per annum pension until legislation was passed and enacted to pay a pension to a past prime minister or their widow after their death.

=== Commemorations ===
Curtin is commemorated by the federal seat of Curtin, the Canberra suburb of Curtin, Curtin University in Perth, John Curtin College of the Arts in Fremantle, the John Curtin School of Medical Research in Canberra, the John Curtin Prime Ministerial Library, Curtin Springs in the Northern Territory, RAAF Base Curtin near Derby, John Curtin House, the former headquarters of the Australian Labor Party, Curtin House in Swanston Street, Melbourne, and many other buildings, roads, parks and structures throughout Australia.

In 1975 Curtin was honoured on a postage stamp bearing his portrait issued by Australia Post.

On 14 August 2005, the 60th anniversary of V-P Day, a bronze statue of Curtin in front of Fremantle Town Hall was unveiled by Premier of Western Australia Geoff Gallop.

The John Curtin Hotel in Carlton, Victoria, is named after Curtin.

==== John Curtin Medal ====
In 1998 the John Curtin Medal was established by Curtin University, to be awarded to members of the community "who shared John Curtin's attributes of vision, leadership, and community service, and who have made a significant contribution in their chosen field". The medal was discontinued after 2023. Past winners include:

- 1998: Eric Tan, the first overseas student to graduate at the top of his class at any medical school in the nation
- 2003: John Fawcett, who established a mobile eye clinic in Bali, to restore vision to those unable to get to the city
- 2009: Pat Dodson, the "father of Australian reconciliation"
- 2015: C Kaye Brand, who established the Western Australian Fibromyalgia Network in 2007
- 2023: Joanne Beedie, who co-founded Helping Little Hands, a charity that supports families with premature and sick babies in WA

== In popular culture ==
- Michael Blakemore portrayed Curtin in the television mini-series The Last Bastion (1984).
- Terence Donovan portrayed Curtin in the film Death of a Soldier (1986).
- William McInnes portrayed Curtin in the telemovie Curtin (2007).
- Simon Burke portrayed Curtin in the Firaxis Games 4X strategy video game, Civilization VI. Curtin appears in the game as the leader of the Australia civilization, which was added to the game in 2017 as part of the "Australia Civilization & Scenario Pack" DLC.

== See also ==
- Curtin government
- First Curtin Ministry
- Second Curtin Ministry
- Military history of Australia during World War II
- Residence of John Curtin

== General references ==
Biographies

- Day, David (1999). Curtin: A Life. Pymble, New South Wales: HarperCollins. ISBN 0-207-19669-9.
- Dowsing, Irene (1969). Curtin of Australia. Acacia Press. ISBN 91-30-00121-8.
- Edwards, John (2017). John Curtin's War – Volume I: The Coming of War in the Pacific, and Reinventing Australia. Viking. ISBN 978-0-670-07347-4. OCLC 1081065848.
- Edwards, John (2018). John Curtin's War: Volume II – Triumph and Decline. Melbourne, Victoria: Viking. ISBN 978-0-14379-136-2. OCLC 1043833675.
- Ross, Lloyd (1977). John Curtin. Macmillan. ISBN 0-522-84734-X.

Other works

- Black, David (1995). In His Own Words: John Curtin's Speeches and Writings. Perth: Paradigm Books, Curtin University. ISBN 978-1-86342-422-6.
- Butlin, S.J.; Schedvin, C. B. (1977). War Economy 1942-1945. Canberra: Australian War Memorial.
- Byrne, Liam. Becoming John Curtin and James Scullin: The Making of the Modern Labor Party (Melbourne University Publishing, 2020)
- Hasluck, Paul (1970). The Government and the People 1942–1945. Canberra: Australian War Memorial.
- MacArthur, Douglas (1964). Reminiscences of General of the Army Douglas MacArthur. Annapolis: Bluejacket Books. OCLC 220661276.
- Wigmore, Lionel (1957). The Japanese Thrust. Canberra: Australian War Memorial.
- Wurth, Bob (2006). Saving Australia: Curtin's Secret Peace with Japan. Lothian Press. ISBN 0-7344-0904-4.

Parliament of Australia
Preceded by William Watson	Member for Fremantle; 1928–1931	Succeeded by William Watson
Preceded by William Watson	Member for Fremantle; 1934–1945	Succeeded by Kim Beazley Sr.
Political offices
Preceded by James Scullin	Leader of the Opposition of Australia; 1935–1941	Succeeded by Arthur Fadden
Preceded by Arthur Fadden	Prime Minister of Australia; 1941–1945	Succeeded by Frank Forde
Preceded by Robert Menzies	Minister for Defence Co-ordination; 1941–1942	Succeeded by Himself as Minister for Defence
Preceded by Himself as Minister for Defence Co-ordination	Minister for Defence; 1942–1945	Succeeded by Jack Beasley
Party political offices
Preceded by James Scullin	Leader of the Australian Labor Party; 1935–1945	Succeeded by Ben Chifley
