= 1935 Australian Labor Party leadership election =

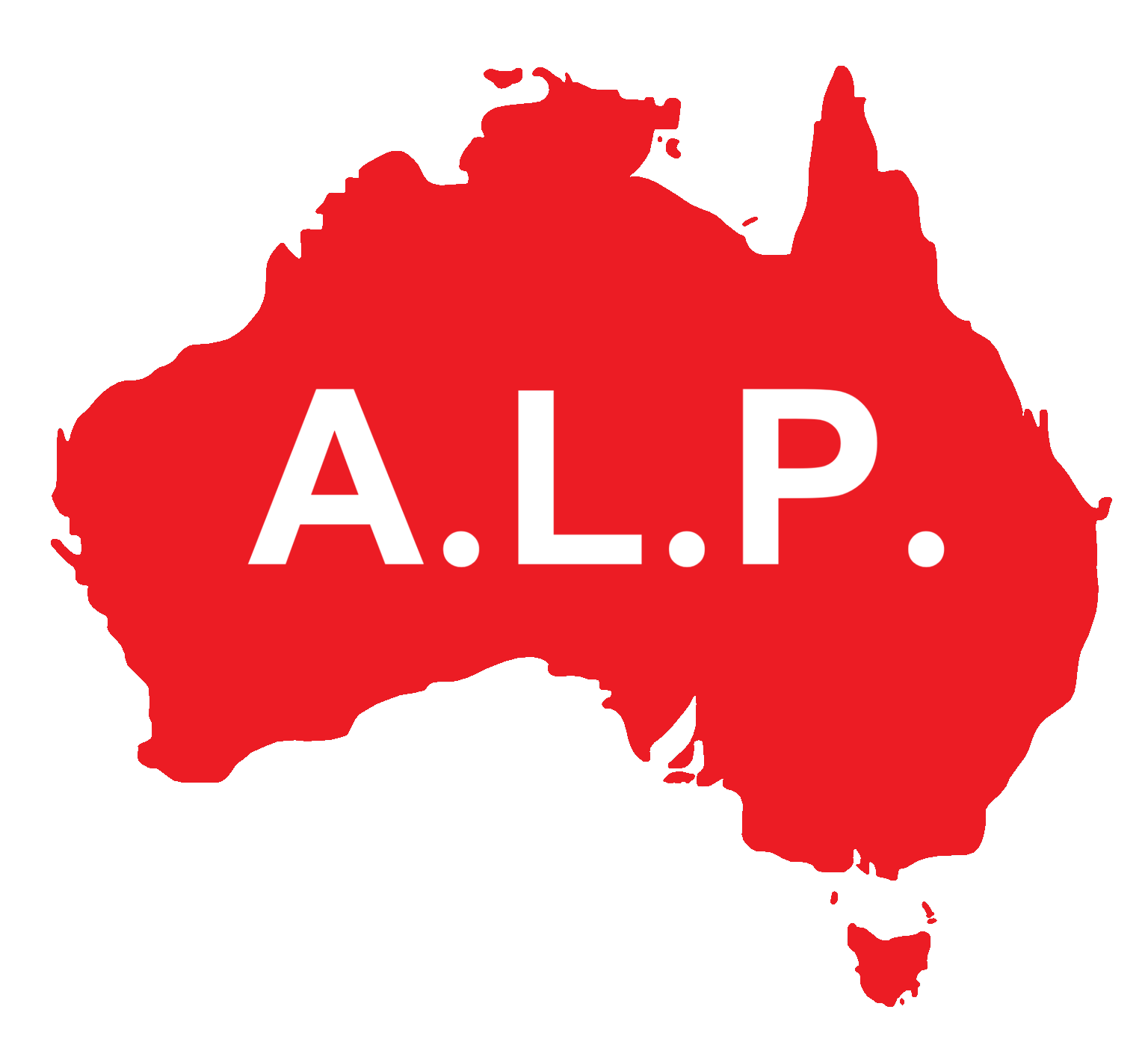
- 1 October 1935
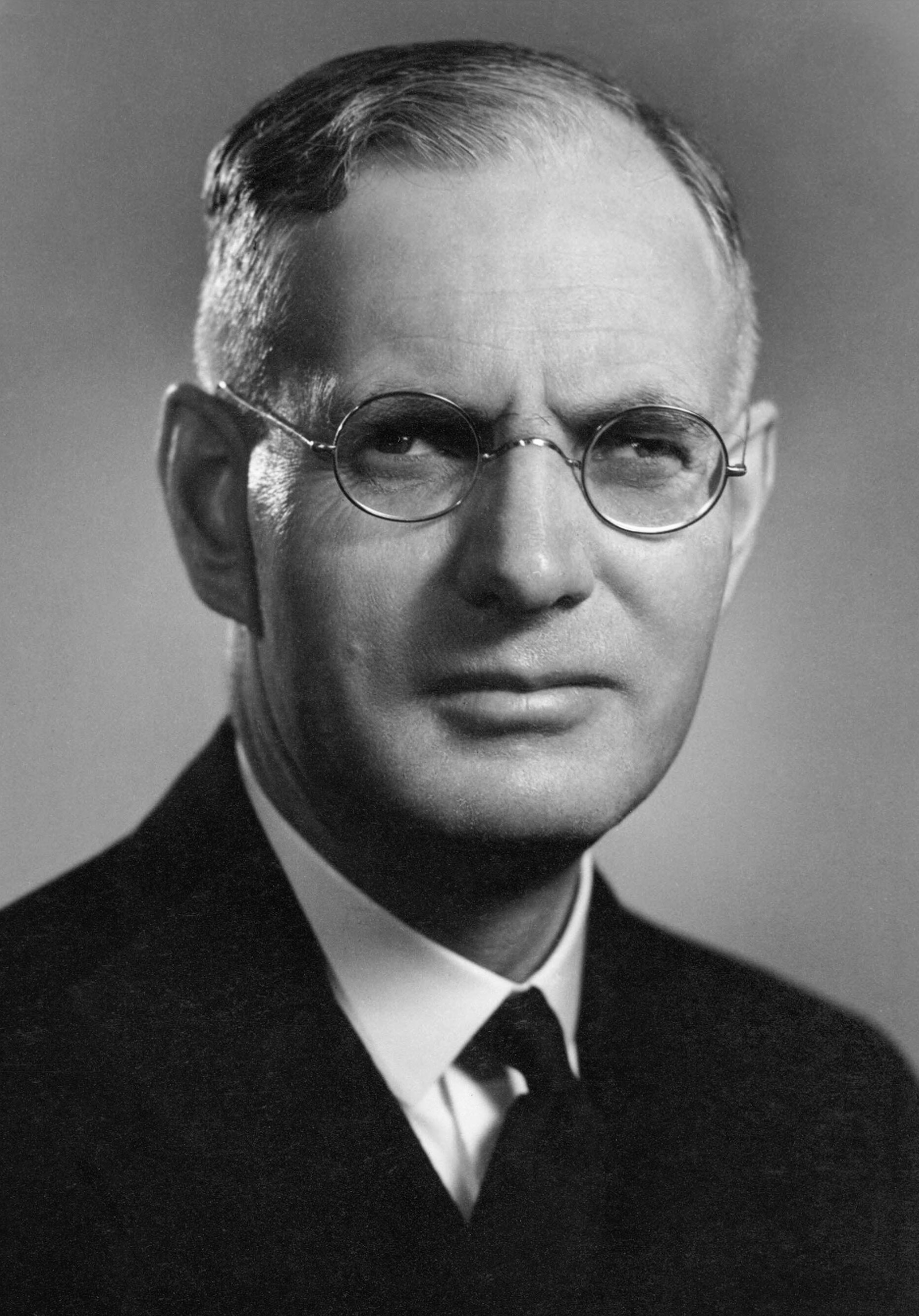

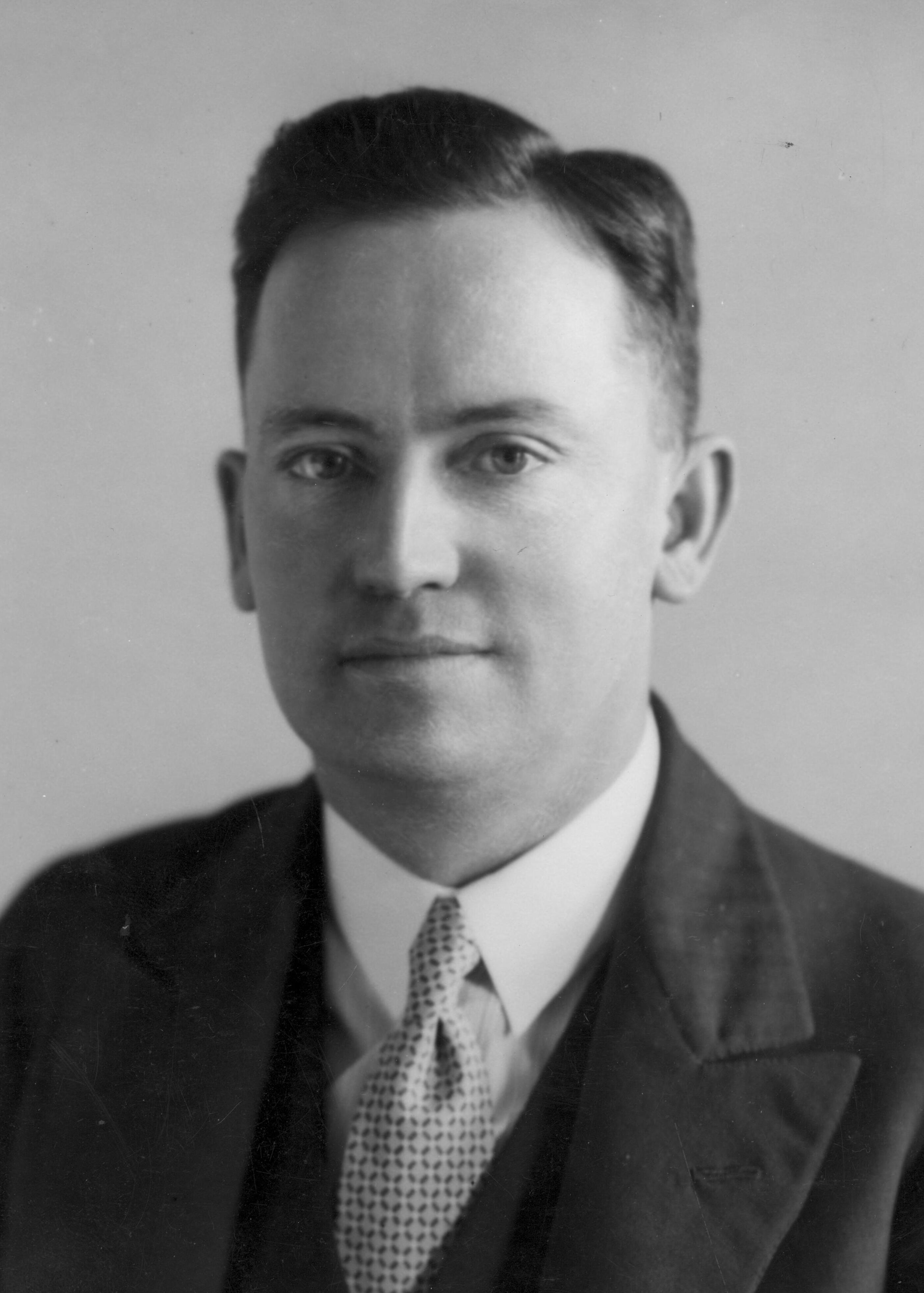

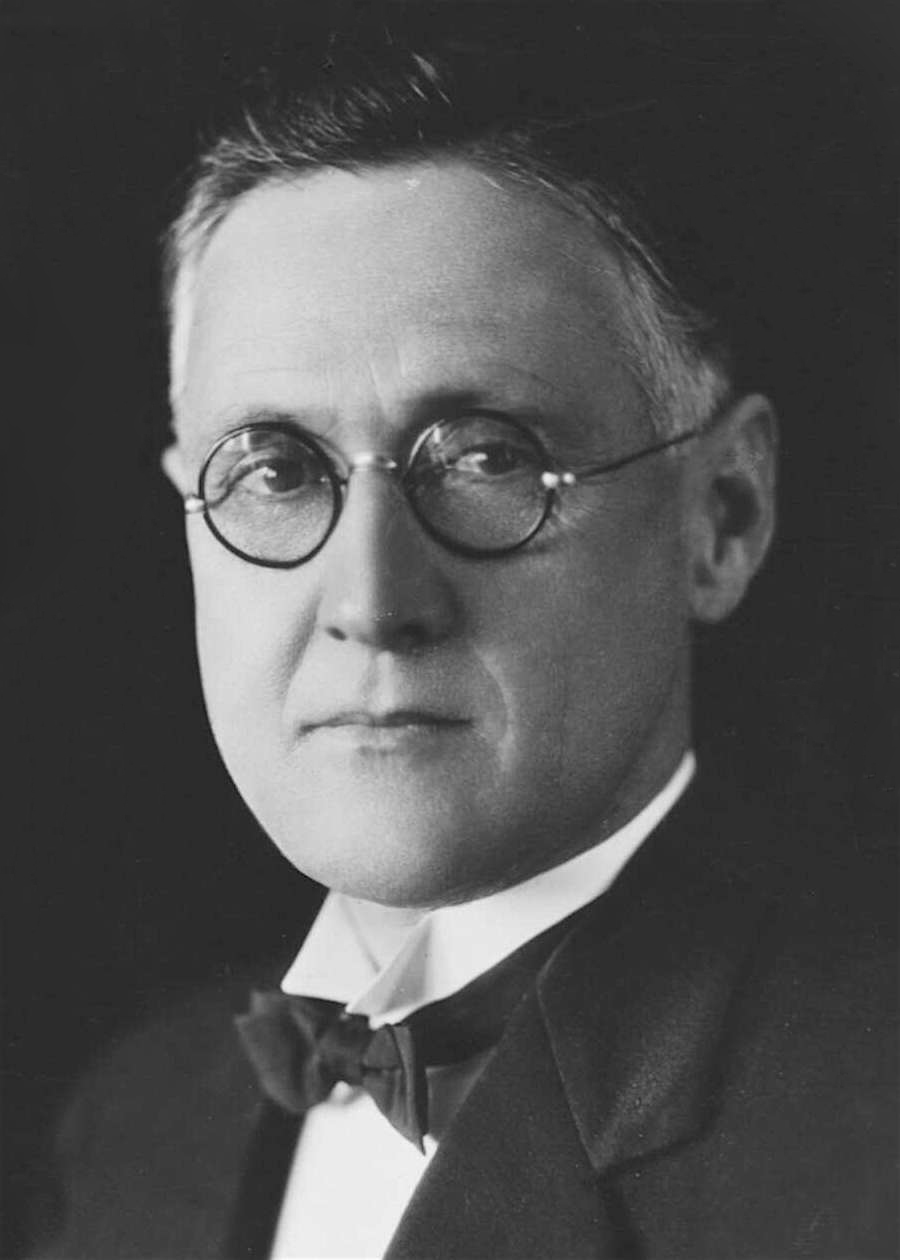
Candidate	John Curtin	Frank Forde	Norman Makin
First Ballot	9 (42.9%)	10 (47.6%)	2 (9.5%)
Second Ballot	11 (52.4%)	10 (47.6%)	Eliminated
Leader before election
James Scullin
Elected Leader
John Curtin

The Australian Labor Party held a leadership election on 1 October 1935, following the resignation of James Scullin. John Curtin was elected as his replacement, defeating Frank Forde and Norman Makin, and consequently became Leader of the Opposition.

== Background ==
Scullin had suffered persistent ill health for several years, and announced his intention to resign the leadership on 28 August 1935. A caucus meeting was held on 23 September, although Scullin was absent due to a bout of influenza; the meeting passed a motion asking him to continue as leader, which he subsequently declined. A second meeting was held on 1 October, at which Scullin formally resigned and called for a leadership ballot.

All 21 members of the Labor caucus voted, although three were overseas and voted by telegram; the nine Lang Labor members were ineligible to vote, as they had not yet reconciled with the main party. There were three candidates – deputy leader Frank Forde, John Curtin, and Norman Makin. On the first ballot, Makin (who was overseas) received only two votes, and was eliminated. It was reported that both Makin voters transferred their support to Curtin on the second ballot, who was elected by a single vote over Forde. Curtin's victory was unexpected, as Forde was seen as the natural successor and had prior ministerial experience. Forde's association with the Scullin government and support of the Premiers' Plan were believed to have played against him. Curtin was the first leader of a major political party to represent a constituency in Western Australia.

== Results ==
The following table gives the ballot results:

Candidate	1st ballot	2nd ballot
John Curtin	9	11
Frank Forde	10	10
Norman Makin	2	Eliminated
