= James del Piano =

Australian politician

James Andrew del Piano OMRI, OBE

Deputy Lord Mayor of Perth
- In office 1974–1975

City of Perth Councillor
- In office 1967–1977

President of Azzurri Soccer Club
- In office 1950–1952

President of Azzurri Soccer Club
- In office 1956–1957

Personal details
- Born: Giacomo del Piano; 17 November 1916 Kalgoorlie, Western Australia
- Died: 13 July 1981 (aged 64) Subiaco, Western Australia
- Resting place: Karrakatta Cemetery

James Andrew del Piano OBE (1916–1981) was an Australian businessman and civic leader.

== Early life ==
He was born Giacomo del Piano on 17 November 1916 in Kalgoorlie, Western Australia. His parents were Giovanni and Maria (née Mazzina). After primary education in Widgiemooltha and Kalgoorlie he moved to Italy where he finished his education in Castello dell'Acqua. He worked in an office until the death of his father when he moved back to Australia with his mother in 1935. In 1935 del Piano enrolled at the University of Western Australia, where he studied engineering. Before he could finish his degree, he joined the Australian Government as an engineering draftsman.

== Internment ==
In 1942 del Piano was interned after allegations were made that he had fascist sympathies. He spent time in Fremantle Prison before spending time in internment camps in country Western Australia and South Australia. He was released in early 1944.

== Business ==
After World War II finished del Piano opened his own business, specialising in immigration and shipping. In the late 1940s he diversified into real estate and by the 1960s he had become involved in the timber industry.

== Public life ==
In 1947 he became president of the Western Australian Italian Club a role he held for eighteen years. His time in charge was notable for the significant increase in membership from 50 to over 3000.

During the 1950s he served four years, over two stints, as president of the Azzuri Soccer Club.

Del Piano spent ten years as a City of Perth councillor, including two years as Deputy Lord Mayor.

== Honours ==
For his services to the Italian diaspora community in Australia he was awarded the Order of the Star of Italian Solidarity in 1955 and later made an officer then commander of the Order of Merit of the Italian Republic. In 1977 he was made an officer of the Order of the British Empire.

== Death ==
Del Piano died on 13 July 1981 of cancer. He was buried at Karrakatta Cemetery.
