= Marion Bell (motorist) =

First woman to circumnavigate Australia by car

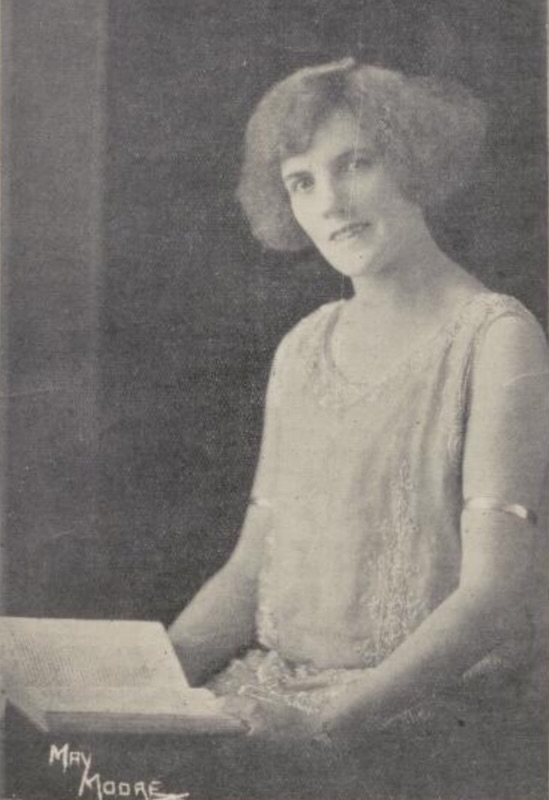
Marion Bell

Mabel Marion Bell (née Chaffey; 1891–1982) was a New Zealand-born motorist, businesswoman, and the first woman to encircle Australia by car.

== Early and personal life ==
Marion Bell was born on 18 November 1891 in Okaihau, Northland, New Zealand. Her parents were Ernest Chaffey and Marion Williams.

Bell grew up in a remote part of New Zealand and thus became an experienced bush woman, horse rider, and later mechanic. On one day when she was only ten years old, she took one of her father's racehorses and visited her grandmother (almost 600 km away) without telling anyone. She managed to cover 430 km before the horse tired, but found shelter in a Maori hut and rode to safety the next day. As a young woman, Bell once rode the full length of the South Island and travelled through the South Sea Islands and the Americas.

Bell was also very entrepreneurial. After she moved to Australia, she ran a furrier's business in Sydney and later a charabanc business in Fremantle. By 1929, she bought out the Fremantle Taxi Service with her second husband and significantly reformed the business, hiring ambulance officers with first aid training. She also often jumped behind the wheel when they were low on staff.

In 1921, she married William Robert Sinclair, a Barrister, in Melbourne. In August 1922, Sinclair died unexpectedly. Bell remarried in Melbourne later that year to Thomas Henry ‘Norman’ Bell.

She had two children, daughter Marion in 1913 and son Cedric Cecil in 1914 (who later became a notable Fremantle fast bowler).

== Motor tour around Australia ==
In 1925, when ‘round’ car journeys became a national obsession, Bell announced she would be completing a motor tour of Australia. On 14 October 1925 in an Oldsmobile Six, sponsored by Vulcan Oil Company, Fremantle, she set off from the Fremantle Town Hall with her 11-year-old daughter and travelled over 19,000 kilometres in five months. They stopped at small settlements and cattle stations along the northwestern coast of Australia and then continued through the top end before the wet season made driving impossible. It was nearly eight weeks before they reached the northeastern coastline and could tour through Brisbane, Sydney, Melbourne, and Adelaide.

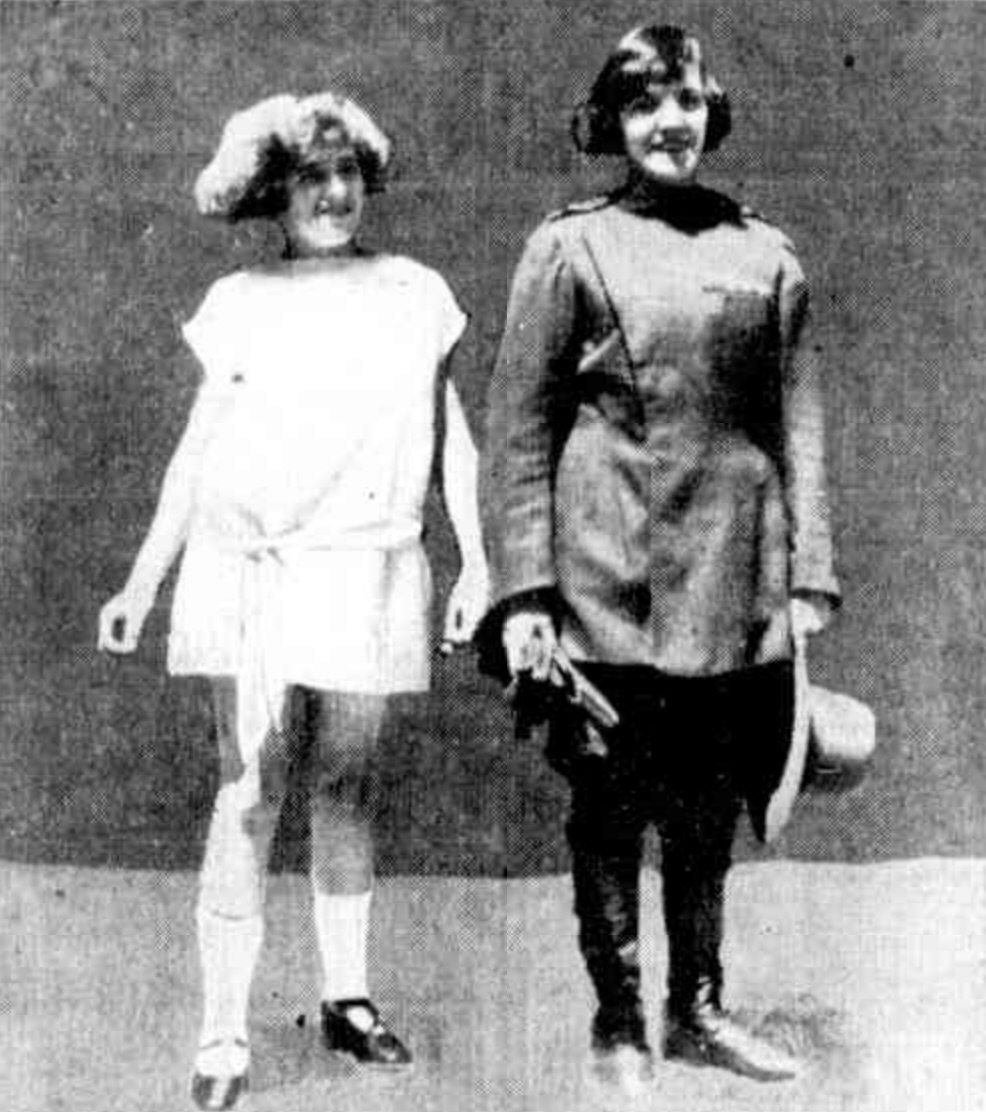
Marion Bell and her daughter in Sydney in 1925

Bell's journey was also more of a speed challenge than a leisurely trip, driving day and night to meet her goals. She was known by some as ‘The Wonder Woman’ with several local newspapers reporting and reflecting on her journey and her car appearing on display in Oldsmobile showrooms in major Australian cities when she did get the rare opportunity to rest. She arrived back in Perth on 7 April 1926 and, after completing the tour, she became the first woman and third person to drive around Australia. She received a large reception and celebration on her return, complete with cinematographers, welcoming speeches, and a crowded press conference. Her achievement was also praised by fellow adventurer and pedestrian traveller of Australia, Aidan de Brune.

While Bell's decision to bring her daughter along was criticised, Marion Bell Jr was a respectable companion. She recorded speedometer readings, filled the radiator, ensured enough air was in the tires, and opened hundreds of gates blocking their route.

Shortly after her return to Perth, some also questioned Bell's ability to complete the drive unaided, as well as her sponsorship and vehicle's veracity. There were murmurs that it was mainly good luck and the kindness of men that brought Bell and her daughter through their journey safely. Most notable was Bell's dispute with Joshua Warner, the second man to complete the same route around the country, where both drivers asserted the other was incompetent to make the journey and had not made it all the way without help. Warner claimed that he was forced to provide Bell with fuel from his own stocks and was delayed due to continuously digging her car out of bogs. Bell strongly disputed this version of events and insisted that it was she who had assisted him to get his car through and loan him oil, not the other way around. The controversy played out in local newspapers, national motoring magazines, and the tabloids. Bell maintained her side of the story and continued to defend herself.

== Later life ==
After her motor tour, Bell continued to run a motor garage, taxi business, and ambulance service in Perth until well after World War II. She had painted in large letters across the garage display window: ‘Marion Bell: The First Woman to Drive Around Australia’.

Marion Bell died on 3 December 1982. Her ashes were scattered at the Karrakatta Cemetery in Perth.
