= Karrakatta Cemetery =

Cemetery in Perth, Western Australia

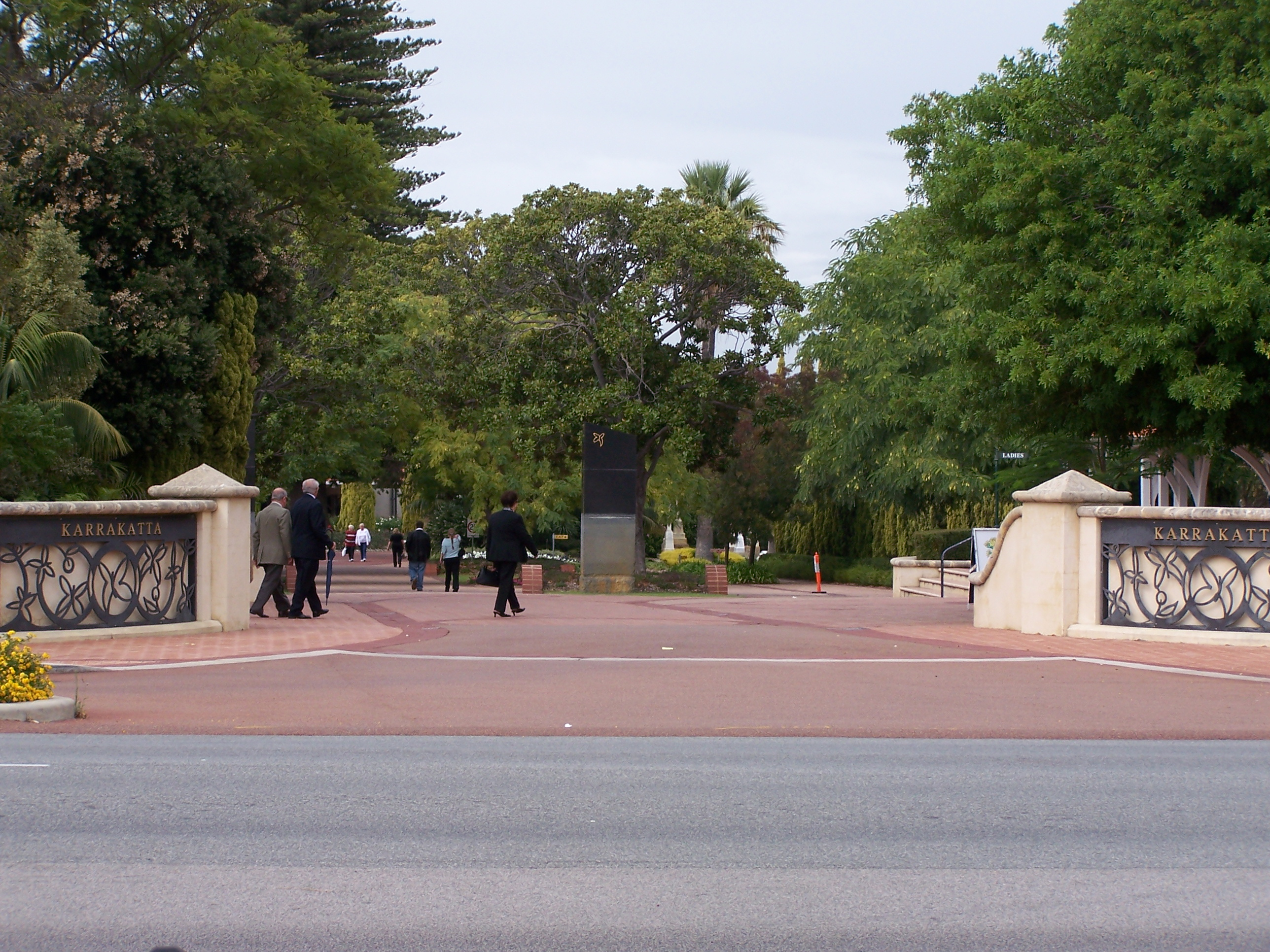
- Main entrance to Karrakatta Cemetery
- Interactive map of Karrakatta Cemetery

Details
- Established: 1899
- Location: Perth
- Country: Australia
- Coordinates: 31°58′12″S 115°47′57″E
- Owned by: State of Western Australia; Crown Grant in Trust held by the Trustees of the Karrakatta Cemetery of Karrakatta (operated by the Metropolitan Cemeteries Board as the statutory authority responsible)
- Size: 98.34 ha (243.0 acres)
- No. of graves: >201,000
- No. of cremations: >189,000
- Website: www.mcb.wa.gov.au/our-cemeteries/karrakatta-cemetery
- Find a Grave: Karrakatta Cemetery
- Footnotes: Karrakatta Cemetery – Billion Graves

Western Australia Heritage Register
- Official name: Karrakatta Cemetery
- Type: Municipal Inventory
- Criteria: Category B
- Designated: 27 April 1999
- Reference no.: 612
- Municipality: City of Nedlands

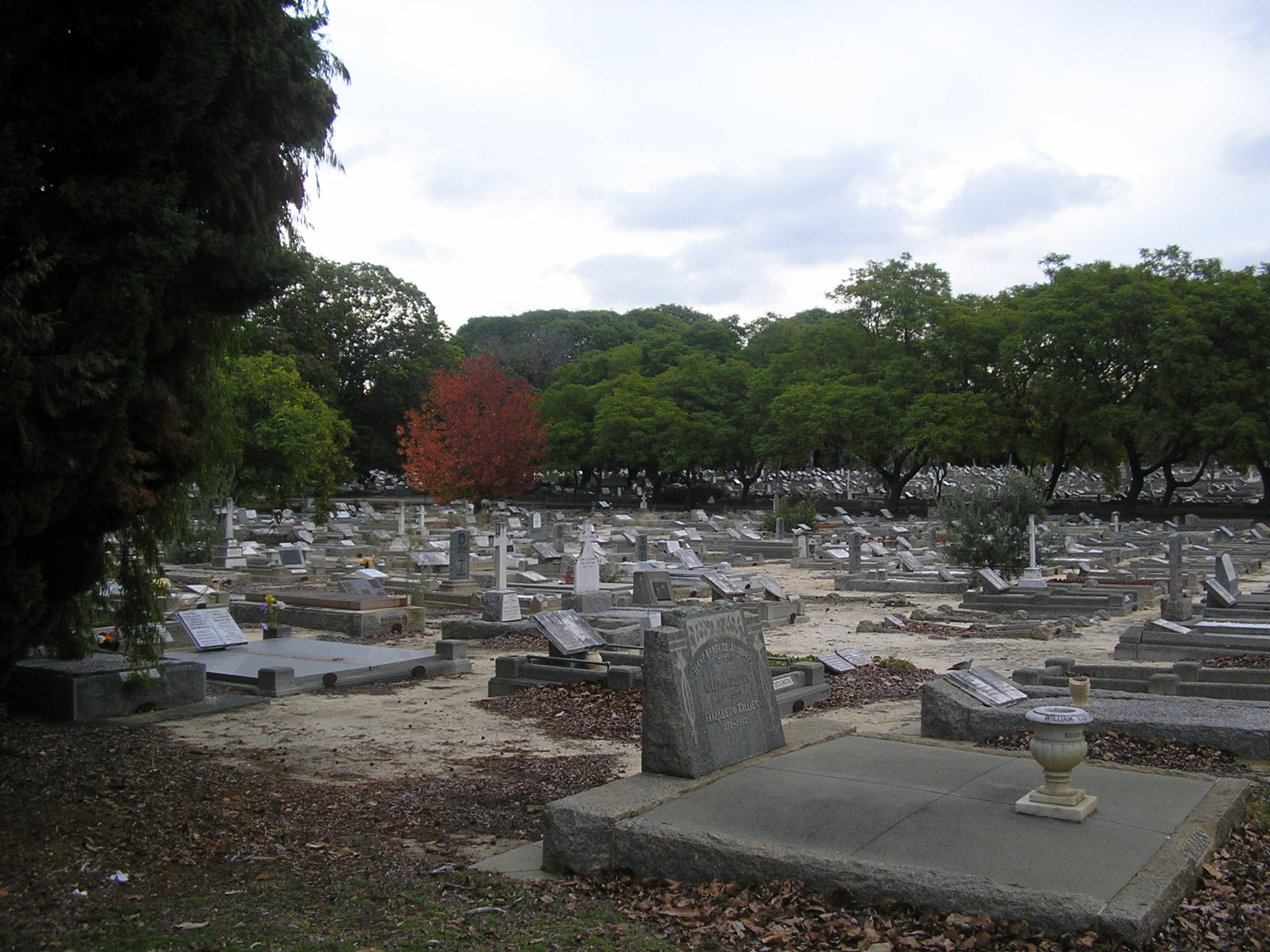
Karrakatta Cemetery grounds

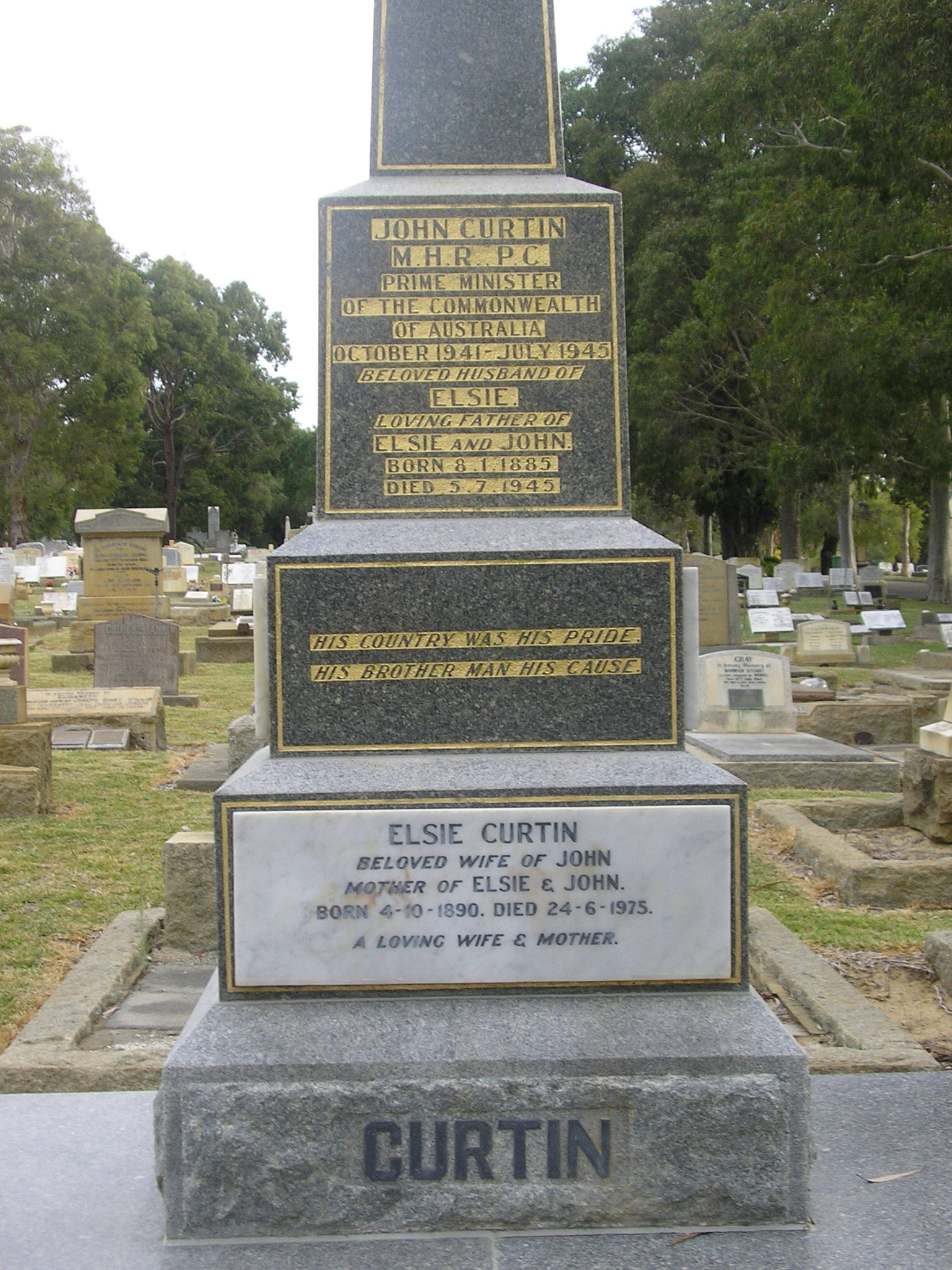
John and Elsie Curtin's grave

Karrakatta Cemetery is a metropolitan cemetery in the suburb of Karrakatta in Perth, Western Australia. Karrakatta Cemetery first opened for burials in 1899, the first being that of wheelwright Robert Creighton. Managed by the Metropolitan Cemeteries Board, the cemetery attracts more than one million visitors each year. Cypress trees located near the main entrance are a hallmark of Karrakatta Cemetery. The cemetery contains a crematorium, and in 1995 Western Australia's first mausoleum opened at the site.

The entrance (known as the Waiting House) includes a structure designed by George Temple-Poole.

== Redevelopment ==
According to community group Saving Family Headstones at Karrakatta (also known as SFH@K), a redevelopment program—marked by the Metropolitan Cemeteries Board (MCB) as Cemetery Renewal—has been under way at Karrakatta Cemetery since 1970. The redevelopment program is carried out under Part V Division 4 of the Cemeteries Act 1986 (WA), which permits cemetery authorities to implement "redevelopment schemes" within existing burial areas.

Saving Family Headstones at Karrakatta reports that, as of September 2026, 48 sections have already been cleared and that dozens more are listed for future schemes. The group describes redevelopment as the mass removal of headstones, grave surrounds and plot numbers to create space for new graves, mausoleums and cremation memorial gardens. Removed monuments may be relocated, fixed to new walls or destroyed, while grave surrounds are sometimes reused as garden edging.

For many years almost all new graves at Karrakatta have been dug between existing burials in redeveloped sections, leaving no memorial on the original plots. Saving Family Headstones at Karrakatta states that all mausoleums and most cremation gardens are built directly over earlier graves.

The MCB maintains that "no human remains are disturbed" during redevelopment. Saving Family Headstones at Karrakatta notes that this assurance is disputed by individuals with cemetery management experience.

Saving Family Headstones at Karrakatta argues that redevelopment severs historical links by removing monuments and primarily benefits government revenue and the funeral industry rather than meeting a genuine shortage of burial space. The group highlights that the MCB operates five other metropolitan cemeteries with available plots and that a 38‑hectare cemetery reserve at Whitby, set aside in 2012, remains undeveloped.

In 2018 market research commissioned by the MCB found that only 28 per cent of the community was aware of redevelopment.

As of August 2026, the following sections have already undergone redevelopment:

- Anglican BC (now Anglican Lawn 4 Gardens)
- Anglican CC (now Anglican Lawn 5; H L Downe Gardens)
- Anglican DA (now Lawn ANDA)
- Anglican DC (now Sir Thomas Meagher Gardens 5A)
- Anglican EC (now EC Section Gardens)
- Anglican FC (now Lawn ANFC)
- Anglican GA (now Lawn ANGA)
- Anglican HA (now Lawn ANHA)
- Anglican HC (now Lawn ANHC)
- Anglican IC (now IC Section Gardens)
- Anglican JA (now General ANJA)
- Anglican KA (now General ANKA)
- Anglican KC (now Sir Thomas Meagher Gardens 5B)
- Anglican LA (now Lawn ANLA)
- Anglican LC (now Sir Thomas Meagher Gardens 5C)
- Anglican MA (now General ANMA)
- Anglican MC (now MC Section Gardens)
- Anglican NA (now Lawn ANNA)
- Anglican NC (now Lawn ANNC)
- Anglican OA (now Lawn ANOA)
- Anglican OC (now Lawn ANOC)
- Anglican RC (now RC Section Gardens)
- Anglican UC (now Lawn ANUC; ANUC Section Gardens)
- Anglican VC (now Lawn ANVC; Peter MacLean Gardens)
- Anglican WA (now Harmony Rose Gardens)
- Anglican XC (now Killara Gardens)
- Anglican ZK (now Lawn ANZK)
- Anglican ZL (now Lawn ANZL)
- Anglican ZO (now Lawn ANZO)
- Brethren AA (now Brethren Lawn AA; Brethren Memorial Gardens)
- Chinese AA (now Chinese CA; Chinese DA)
- Chinese BA (now Chinese CA; Chinese DA)
- Congregational BA (now Lawn COBA; COBA Section Gardens)
- Congregational EA (now Lawn COEA)
- Congregational FA (now Lawn COFA)
- General BA (now Lawn GEBA)
- General CA (now Lawn CADA)
- General DA (now Lawn CADA)
- Japanese AA (now Japanese Gardens)
- Roman Catholic BB (now Lance Howard Memorial Gardens)
- Roman Catholic CB (now Lance Howard Memorial Gardens)
- Roman Catholic DB (now Serenity Gardens)
- Roman Catholic EA (now Infants' Butterfly Gardens)
- Roman Catholic EC (now Lawn ROEC)
- Roman Catholic FA (now Mausoleum Stages 1–4)
- Roman Catholic FC (now Lance Howard Memorial Gardens)
- Roman Catholic IA (now Contemplation Gardens; Mausoleum Stage 5)
- Roman Catholic JA (now All Saints Mausoleum)

Redevelopment of the Anglican FA, Anglican IA and General AA sections is planned to commence in November 2026, with the Wesleyan DA and Wesleyan EC sections planned for redevelopment post-December 2026.

The MCB has only publicly disclosed its redevelopment timetable for the period 2025 to 2040, within which the following sections are named, with commencement date(s) yet to be announced:

- Anglican: LB, LD, RA, SC, WB, WD, WE, WF, WI, YC, ZI, ZM
- Congregational: AA
- Roman Catholic: DA, HA, KA, LC, MC, SC
- Wesleyan: BC, DC, EA, FA, GC

These sections represent only a small proportion of the MCB's eventual reclamation plans. Beyond 2040, the MCB intends to redevelop the majority of graves at Karrakatta, with approximately 75 per cent of all sections deemed "suitable" for reclamation—a figure that will, inevitably, draw in additional denominations beyond those currently named.

== War graves ==
As of June 2022, Karrakatta Cemetery contains the graves of 111 Commonwealth service personnel of World War I and 141 of World War II, besides a Dutch naval sailor of the latter war, divided between the cemetery's various denominational plots.

The Commonwealth War Graves Commission (CWGC) has a memorial to 15 Australian service personnel – 2 sailors, 9 soldiers, 4 airmen – who died in World War II and were cremated at Karrakatta Crematorium. In addition, 7 Australian personnel of the same war – 2 sailors, 4 soldiers, 1 airman – who were cremated at Karrakatta Crematorium but whose ashes had been scattered or buried at places where CWGC commemoration was not possible are listed by name on the Western Australia Cremation Memorial at the separate Perth War Cemetery.

== Notable people ==
Notable people interred within Karrakatta Cemetery include:

- Jessie Argyle, an Aboriginal Western Australian woman who led a community space for Aboriginal people
- William Baldwin, New Zealand politician
- Jean Beadle, Australian feminist, social worker, and Labor Party member
- Marion Bell, motorist and first woman to encircle Australia by car
- Simon Cain, actor, horse breeder and Aboriginal art gallery owner
- Edith Cowan, social reformer, first Australian woman to serve as a member of parliament
- Elsie Curtin, wife of John Curtin
- John Curtin, 14th Prime Minister of Australia
- Sir John Dwyer KCMG, Chief Justice, Lieutenant-Governor, buried with Lady Emily Louise Dwyer
- Sir John Forrest, 1st Premier of Western Australia
- Joseph Furphy, author
- Dame Alexandra Hasluck, author and wife of Paul Hasluck
- Sir Paul Hasluck, 17th Governor-General of Australia and politician
- Sir Joseph John Talbot Hobbs (1864–1938), Australian Army General (cenotaph)
- Heath Ledger, actor (ashes)
- Matthew Locke, soldier (ashes)
- Paul McGinness, co-founder of Qantas Airways
- Monty Miller, trade unionist
- John Scaddan, 10th Premier of Western Australia
- William Stratton, Chief of Air Staff (1969–1971), Royal New Zealand Air Force
- A. O. Neville, the first Chief Protector of Aborigines
- James del Piano, businessman, Italian diaspora aficionado
- J. W. Sutherland (1870–1946), mining engineer and metallurgist in Western Australia
- Frederick Vosper, Australian newspaper journalist, proprietor, and politician
- Edward Wittenoom, Australian politician

There are also ten Victoria Cross recipients who are interred in Karrakatta Cemetery:

- Thomas Axford
- John Carroll
- Sir Hughie Edwards
- Robert Gee
- James Heather Gordon
- George Julian Howell
- Martin O'Meara
- Clifford Sadlier
- Hugo Throssell
- James Park Woods

There is also a mass grave of 16 unidentified victims of the 1950 Australian National Airways Douglas DC-4 crash.

== See also ==
- Burials at Karrakatta Cemetery
- East Perth Cemeteries
