= Elsie Curtin =

Spouse of the Prime Minister of Australia from 1941 to 1945

Elsie Curtin CBE
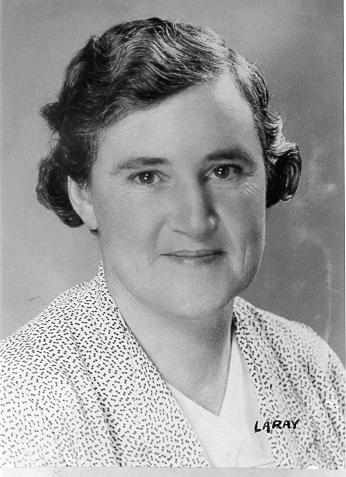
- Curtin in 1937

Spouse of the Prime Minister of Australia
- In role 7 October 1941 – 5 July 1945
- Prime Minister: John Curtin
- Preceded by: Ilma Fadden
- Succeeded by: Veronica Forde

Personal details
- Born: Elsie Needham; 4 October 1890 Ballarat, Victoria
- Died: 24 June 1975 (aged 84) Cottesloe, Western Australia
- Resting place: Karrakatta Cemetery
- Spouse: John Curtin (m. 1917; died 1945)
- Children: Elsie; John
- Occupation: Community worker

Elsie Curtin CBE (née Needham; 4 October 1890 – 24 June 1975) was the wife of John Curtin, the 14th Prime Minister of Australia.

== Biography ==
Curtin was born in Ballarat, Victoria, to parents Annie and Abraham Needham. From 1898 to 1910, she lived in Cape Town, Cape Colony (now Western Cape, South Africa). During the 1910s, she moved to Hobart, Tasmania, where she met John Curtin. They married in Perth, Western Australia, on 21 April 1917, and had two children.

During her husband's wartime premiership, she supported him at two homes. She arranged functions and launched ships. Her husband died in office on 5 July 1945, and she attended the public funeral.

In 1944, she became the Labour Women's Union's Western Australian President, a role she kept until September 1946.

Curtin died on 24 June 1975 in Cottesloe.

Honorary titles
Preceded by Ilma Fadden	Spouse of the Prime Minister of Australia; 7 October 1941 – 5 July 1945	Succeeded by Veronica Forde
