= Electoral results for the Division of Kennedy =

Australian division election results

This is a list of electoral results for the Division of Kennedy in Australian federal elections from the division's creation in 1901 until the present.

== Members ==
Member	Party	Term
Charles McDonald	Labor	1901–1925
Grosvenor Francis	Nationalist	1925–1929
Darby Riordan	Labor	1929–1936
Bill Riordan	Labor	1936–1966
Bob Katter Sr.	Country	1966–1975
Bob Katter Sr.	National Country	1975–1982
Bob Katter Sr.	National	1982–1990
Rob Hulls	Labor	1990–1993
Bob Katter Jr.	National	1993–2001
Bob Katter Jr.	Independent	2001–2011
Bob Katter Jr.	Katter's Australian	2011–present

== Election results ==
=== Elections in the 2020s ===
==== 2025 ====
2025 Australian federal election: Kennedy
Party	Candidate	Votes	%	±%
Liberal National	Annette Swaine			
Independent	Steven Clare			
Greens	Carole Stanford			
Family First	Douglas Lush			
One Nation	Kate Harris			
Labor	Sharon Winn			
Trumpet of Patriots	Mark Westcott			
Katter's Australian	Bob Katter			
Total formal votes				
Informal votes				
Turnout				

==== 2022 ====
2022 Australian federal election: Kennedy
Party	Candidate	Votes	%	±%
Katter's Australian	Bob Katter	39,036	41.70	+0.74
Liberal National	Bryce Macdonald	26,387	28.19	+0.71
Labor	Jason Brandon	15,033	16.06	−0.92
Greens	Jennifer Cox	6,013	6.42	+1.25
United Australia	Peter Campion	4,154	4.44	−2.22
Independent	Jen Sackley	2,981	3.18	+3.18
Total formal votes		93,604	96.72	+0.88
Informal votes		3,171	3.28	−0.88
Turnout		96,775	84.59	−4.51
Notional two-party-preferred count
Liberal National	Bryce Macdonald	56,312	60.16	−4.35
Labor	Jason Brandon	37,292	39.84	+4.35
Two-candidate-preferred result
Katter's Australian	Bob Katter	59,060	63.10	−0.23
Liberal National	Bryce Macdonald	34,544	36.90	+0.23
Katter's Australian hold		Swing	−0.23	

Alluvial diagram for preference flows in the seat of Kennedy in the 2022 federal election. indicates at what stage the winning candidate had over 50% of the votes and was declared the winner.

=== Elections in the 2010s ===
==== 2019 ====
2019 Australian federal election: Kennedy
Party	Candidate	Votes	%	±%
Katter's Australian	Bob Katter	37,665	40.96	+2.59
Liberal National	Frank Beveridge	25,264	27.48	−5.11
Labor	Brett McGuire	15,612	16.98	−2.57
United Australia	Sue Bertuch	6,124	6.66	+6.66
Greens	Lyle Burness	4,751	5.17	+0.21
Conservative National	Ian Hackwell	2,532	2.75	+2.75
Total formal votes		91,948	95.84	−0.17
Informal votes		3,996	4.16	+0.17
Turnout		95,944	89.10	−0.46
Notional two-party-preferred count
Liberal National	Frank Beveridge	59,319	64.51	+7.77
Labor	Brett McGuire	32,629	35.49	−7.77
Two-candidate-preferred result
Katter's Australian	Bob Katter	58,231	63.33	+2.33
Liberal National	Frank Beveridge	33,717	36.67	−2.33
Katter's Australian hold		Swing	+2.33	

==== 2016 ====
2016 Australian federal election: Kennedy
Party	Candidate	Votes	%	±%
Katter's Australian	Bob Katter	34,277	39.85	+10.49
Liberal National	Jonathan Pavetto	27,806	32.33	−8.51
Labor	Norm Jacobsen	16,480	19.16	+2.78
Greens	Valerie Weier	4,213	4.90	+1.66
Family First	Donna Gallehawk	3,234	3.76	+2.49
Total formal votes		86,010	96.18	+1.61
Informal votes		3,418	3.82	−1.61
Turnout		89,428	89.53	−2.73
Notional two-party-preferred count
Liberal National	Jonathan Pavetto	48,903	56.86	−10.29
Labor	Norm Jacobsen	37,107	43.14	+10.29
Two-candidate-preferred result
Katter's Australian	Bob Katter	52,570	61.12	+8.93
Liberal National	Jonathan Pavetto	33,440	38.88	−8.93
Katter's Australian hold		Swing	+8.93	

==== 2013 ====
2013 Australian federal election: Kennedy
Party	Candidate	Votes	%	±%
Liberal National	Noeline Ikin	34,344	40.84	+14.24
Katter's Australian	Bob Katter	24,691	29.36	−17.35
Labor	Andrew Turnour	13,777	16.38	−3.83
Palmer United	Ronald Brazier	6,419	7.63	+7.63
Greens	Jenny Stirling	2,727	3.24	−1.25
Family First	Dan Vogler	1,064	1.27	−0.73
Independent	Chester Tuxford	571	0.68	+0.68
Rise Up Australia	Pam Hecht	508	0.60	+0.60
Total formal votes		84,101	94.57	−0.05
Informal votes		4,828	5.43	+0.05
Turnout		88,929	92.26	+0.81
Notional two-party-preferred count
Liberal National	Noeline Ikin	56,476	67.15	+5.21
Labor	Andrew Turnour	27,625	32.85	−5.21
Two-candidate-preferred result
Katter's Australian	Bob Katter	43,896	52.19	−16.15
Liberal National	Noeline Ikin	40,205	47.81	+16.15
Member changed to Katter's Australian from Independent		Swing	−16.15	

==== 2010 ====
2010 Australian federal election: Kennedy
Party	Candidate	Votes	%	±%
Independent	Bob Katter	38,170	46.71	+9.91
Liberal National	Ed Morrison	21,737	26.60	+0.30
Labor	Andrew Turnour	16,513	20.21	−8.78
Greens	Jess Jones	3,669	4.49	+1.11
Family First	Fred Dykstra	1,633	2.00	+0.02
Total formal votes		81,722	94.62	−1.44
Informal votes		4,648	5.38	+1.44
Turnout		86,370	91.43	−2.47
Notional two-party-preferred count
Liberal National	Ed Morrison	50,616	61.94	+4.65
Labor	Andrew Turnour	31,106	38.06	−4.65
Two-candidate-preferred result
Independent	Bob Katter	55,852	68.34	+2.05
Liberal National	Ed Morrison	25,870	31.66	+31.66
Independent hold		Swing	+2.05	

=== Elections in the 2000s ===
==== 2007 ====
2007 Australian federal election: Kennedy
Party	Candidate	Votes	%	±%
Independent	Bob Katter	32,537	39.53	−0.23
Labor	Alan Neilan	23,122	28.09	+4.13
National	Ed Morrison	20,292	24.65	+1.17
Greens	Frank Reilly	2,649	3.22	−0.31
Family First	Keith Douglas	1,674	2.03	−1.12
One Nation	Bill Hankin	1,441	1.75	−2.71
Democrats	Nigel Asplin	604	0.73	+0.03
Total formal votes		82,319	96.16	+0.62
Informal votes		3,291	3.84	−0.62
Turnout		85,610	93.37	−0.26
Notional two-party-preferred count
National	Ed Morrison	47,339	57.51	−1.35
Labor	Alan Neilan	34,980	42.49	+1.35
Two-candidate-preferred result
Independent	Bob Katter	54,571	66.29	−2.54
Labor	Alan Neilan	27,748	33.71	+2.54
Independent hold		Swing	−2.54	

==== 2004 ====
2004 Australian federal election: Kennedy
Party	Candidate	Votes	%	±%
Independent	Bob Katter	32,688	40.13	−3.22
National	James Doyle	19,413	23.83	+10.76
Labor	Alan Neilan	19,296	23.69	−0.49
One Nation	Bill Hankin	3,698	4.54	−5.39
Greens	Angela Jones	2,879	3.53	+1.40
Family First	Keith Douglas	2,592	3.18	+3.18
Democrats	Terry Hennessey	575	0.71	−2.28
Citizens Electoral Council	Judith A Harris	316	0.39	+0.11
Total formal votes		81,457	95.56	+0.29
Informal votes		3,782	4.44	−0.29
Turnout		85,239	92.56	−2.79
Notional two-party-preferred count
National	James Doyle	48,022	58.95	+0.5
Labor	Alan Neilan	33,435	41.05	−0.5
Two-candidate-preferred result
Independent	Bob Katter	56,109	68.88	−0.30
Labor	Alan Neilan	25,348	31.12	+0.30
Independent hold		Swing	−0.30	

==== 2001 ====
2001 Australian federal election: Kennedy
Party	Candidate	Votes	%	±%
Independent	Bob Katter	35,555	47.10	+47.10
Labor	Alan Neilan	17,613	23.33	−5.91
National	Mary Lyle	10,718	14.19	−29.93
One Nation	Jerry Burnett	7,460	9.88	−8.95
Democrats	Jo Wall	2,307	3.06	+0.54
Greens	Cherie Rivas	1,601	2.12	+0.75
Citizens Electoral Council	Judith Harris	229	0.30	−0.03
Total formal votes		75,483	95.35	−0.87
Informal votes		3,685	4.65	+0.87
Turnout		79,168	94.31	
Notional two-party-preferred count
National	Mary Lyle	44,501	58.95	−2.24
Labor	Alan Neilan	30,982	41.05	+2.24
Two-candidate-preferred result
Independent	Bob Katter	52,602	69.73	+69.73
Labor	Alan Neilan	22,881	30.27	−8.53
Member changed to Independent from National		Swing	N/A	

=== Elections in the 1990s ===
==== 1998 ====
1998 Australian federal election: Kennedy
Party	Candidate	Votes	%	±%
National	Bob Katter	33,355	44.12	−12.56
Labor	Kenneth Stark	22,110	29.25	−0.23
One Nation	Jayson Dalton	14,240	18.84	+18.84
Independent	Greg Pohlmann	2,219	2.94	+2.94
Democrats	Alan Isherwood	1,907	2.52	−4.05
Greens	Ken Parker	1,033	1.37	−1.01
Independent	Steve Theodore	476	0.63	+0.63
Citizens Electoral Council	Judy Harris	255	0.34	+0.34
Total formal votes		75,595	96.22	−0.82
Informal votes		2,971	3.78	+0.82
Turnout		78,566	93.15	−0.50
Two-party-preferred result
National	Bob Katter	46,254	61.19	−2.97
Labor	Kenneth Stark	29,341	38.81	+2.97
National hold		Swing	−2.97	

==== 1996 ====
1996 Australian federal election: Kennedy
Party	Candidate	Votes	%	±%
National	Bob Katter	45,074	59.91	+22.75
Labor	Fay Donovan	22,257	29.58	−11.84
Democrats	Col Parker	4,973	6.61	+4.02
Greens	Jo Valentine	1,807	2.40	−0.20
Indigenous Peoples	Clarence Walden	1,124	1.49	+0.96
Total formal votes		75,235	97.13	+0.13
Informal votes		2,221	2.87	−0.13
Turnout		77,456	93.66	−0.27
Two-party-preferred result
National	Bob Katter	48,440	64.49	+11.95
Labor	Fay Donovan	26,673	35.51	−11.95
National hold		Swing	+11.95	

==== 1993 ====
1993 Australian federal election: Kennedy
Party	Candidate	Votes	%	±%
Labor	Rob Hulls	30,920	41.99	−2.83
National	Bob Katter	27,805	37.76	+6.29
Liberal	Dave Cashmore	7,882	10.70	−4.72
Confederate Action	Bill Petrie	3,162	4.29	+4.29
Democrats	Kevin Paine	1,906	2.59	−5.44
Greens	Saeed de Ridder	1,241	1.69	+1.69
Indigenous Peoples	Norman Johnson	401	0.54	+0.54
	Donald Logan	323	0.44	+0.44
Total formal votes		73,640	96.96	−0.23
Informal votes		2,308	3.04	+0.23
Turnout		75,948	93.92	
Two-party-preferred result
National	Bob Katter	38,915	52.88	+4.78
Labor	Rob Hulls	34,675	47.12	−4.78
National gain from Labor		Swing	+4.78	

==== 1990 ====
1990 Australian federal election: Kennedy
Party	Candidate	Votes	%	±%
Labor	Rob Hulls	28,936	44.3	−0.8
National	Ross Shannon	21,751	33.3	−14.0
Liberal	Fred Tritton	9,134	14.0	+6.4
Democrats	Patricia Banzhaf	5,473	8.4	+8.4
Total formal votes		65,294	97.2	
Informal votes		1,901	2.8	
Turnout		67,195	92.6	
Two-party-preferred result
Labor	Rob Hulls	33,536	51.4	+4.4
National	Ross Shannon	31,702	48.6	−4.4
Labor gain from National		Swing	+4.4	

=== Elections in the 1980s ===
==== 1987 ====
1987 Australian federal election: Kennedy
Party	Candidate	Votes	%	±%
National	Bob Katter, Sr.	28,585	47.3	−3.0
Labor	James Byrne	27,208	45.1	+2.2
Liberal	Ross Cooper	4,584	7.6	+3.6
Total formal votes		60,377	94.9	
Informal votes		3,276	5.1	
Turnout		63,653	89.2	
Two-party-preferred result
National	Bob Katter, Sr.	31,989	53.0	−2.2
Labor	James Byrne	28,380	47.0	+2.2
National hold		Swing	−2.2	

==== 1984 ====
1984 Australian federal election: Kennedy
Party	Candidate	Votes	%	±%
National	Bob Katter, Sr.	29,323	50.3	+0.3
Labor	Brigid Walsh	25,033	42.9	−2.3
Liberal	Gerald Porter	2,358	4.0	+4.0
Democrats	Lance Winter	1,586	2.7	−2.1
Total formal votes		58,300	94.6	
Informal votes		3,319	5.4	
Turnout		61,619	90.6	
Two-party-preferred result
National	Bob Katter, Sr.	32,169	55.2	+2.7
Labor	Brigid Walsh	26,126	44.8	−2.7
National hold		Swing	+2.7	

==== 1983 ====
1983 Australian federal election: Kennedy
Party	Candidate	Votes	%	±%
National	Bob Katter, Sr.	32,871	56.6	−3.6
Labor	Brigid Walsh	22,407	38.6	+2.6
Democrats	George Hannaford	2,757	4.8	+4.8
Total formal votes		58,035	98.7	
Informal votes		748	1.3	
Turnout		58,783	90.8	
Two-party-preferred result
National	Bob Katter, Sr.		59.1	−3.6
Labor	Brigid Walsh		40.9	+3.6
National hold		Swing	−3.6	

==== 1980 ====
1980 Australian federal election: Kennedy
Party	Candidate	Votes	%	±%
National Country	Bob Katter, Sr.	33,744	60.2	−1.2
Labor	Susan Hadlow	20,194	36.0	+3.3
Progress	James Fryar	2,103	3.8	+2.0
Total formal votes		56,041	98.2	
Informal votes		1,021	1.8	
Turnout		57,062	92.4	
Two-party-preferred result
National Country	Bob Katter, Sr.		62.7	−1.5
Labor	Susan Hadlow		37.3	+1.5
National Country hold		Swing	−1.5	

=== Elections in the 1970s ===
==== 1977 ====
1977 Australian federal election: Kennedy
Party	Candidate	Votes	%	±%
National Country	Bob Katter, Sr.	33,453	61.4	−2.1
Labor	Robert Gleeson	17,814	32.7	−2.0
Democrats	Raymond Oldham	1,744	3.2	+3.2
Progress	Vrettos Cominos	987	1.8	+0.0
Democrats	Marelle Hicks	521	1.0	+1.0
Total formal votes		54,519	98.4	
Informal votes		913	1.6	
Turnout		55,432	92.9	
Two-party-preferred result
National Country	Bob Katter, Sr.		64.2	−0.7
Labor	Robert Gleeson		35.8	+0.7
National Country hold		Swing	−0.7	

==== 1975 ====
1975 Australian federal election: Kennedy
Party	Candidate	Votes	%	±%
National Country	Bob Katter, Sr.	29,704	62.5	−0.1
Labor	Robert Gleeson	16,981	35.7	−1.7
Workers	Charles Rendall	837	1.8	+1.8
Total formal votes		47,522	98.7	
Informal votes		622	1.3	
Turnout		48,144	93.6	
Two-party-preferred result
National Country	Bob Katter, Sr.		63.9	+1.3
Labor	Robert Gleeson		36.1	−1.3
National Country hold		Swing	+1.3	

==== 1974 ====
1974 Australian federal election: Kennedy
Party	Candidate	Votes	%	±%
Country	Bob Katter, Sr.	29,093	62.6	+5.0
Labor	Tony McGrady	17,363	37.4	−1.7
Total formal votes		46,456	98.5	
Informal votes		703	1.5	
Turnout		47,159	93.9	
Country hold		Swing	+2.4	

==== 1972 ====
1972 Australian federal election: Kennedy
Party	Candidate	Votes	%	±%
Country	Bob Katter, Sr.	23,921	57.6	+3.1
Labor	Tony McGrady	16,261	39.1	−2.8
Democratic Labor	Paul Rutherford	1,366	3.3	−0.2
Total formal votes		41,548	98.4	
Informal votes		676	1.6	
Turnout		42,224	92.6	
Two-party-preferred result
Country	Bob Katter, Sr.		60.2	+3.7
Labor	Tony McGrady		39.8	−3.7
Country hold		Swing	+3.7	

=== Elections in the 1960s ===
==== 1969 ====
1969 Australian federal election: Kennedy
Party	Candidate	Votes	%	±%
Country	Bob Katter, Sr.	21,931	54.5	+6.3
Labor	Gerry Jones	16,860	41.9	−0.9
Democratic Labor	Brian Hurney	1,419	3.5	−4.5
Total formal votes		40,210	98.9	
Informal votes		439	1.1	
Turnout		40,649	92.5	
Two-party-preferred result
Country	Bob Katter, Sr.		56.5	+1.6
Labor	Gerry Jones		44.5	−1.6
Country hold		Swing	+1.6	

==== 1966 ====
1966 Australian federal election: Kennedy
Party	Candidate	Votes	%	±%
Country	Bob Katter, Sr.	15,387	44.8	+12.5
Labor	Barry Dittmer	15,250	44.4	−17.0
Democratic Labor	Edward Bennett	2,762	8.0	+1.7
Independent	John Donaldson	942	2.7	+2.7
Total formal votes		34,341	98.3	
Informal votes		591	1.7	
Turnout		34,932	91.8	
Two-party-preferred result
Country	Bob Katter, Sr.	17,683	51.5	+15.0
Labor	Barry Dittmer	16,658	48.5	−15.0
Country gain from Labor		Swing	+15.0	

==== 1963 ====
1963 Australian federal election: Kennedy
Party	Candidate	Votes	%	±%
Labor	Bill Riordan	21,182	61.4	−0.7
Country	Keith Siemon	11,144	32.3	+0.8
Democratic Labor	John Judge	2,174	6.3	−0.1
Total formal votes		34,500	97.8	
Informal votes		791	2.2	
Turnout		35,291	90.1	
Two-party-preferred result
Labor	Bill Riordan		63.5	+0.1
Country	Keith Siemon		36.5	−0.1
Labor hold		Swing	+0.1	

==== 1961 ====
1961 Australian federal election: Kennedy
Party	Candidate	Votes	%	±%
Labor	Bill Riordan	21,124	62.1	+11.2
Country	Thomas Halloran	10,723	31.5	−1.7
Queensland Labor	Harry Wright	2,163	6.4	−9.5
Total formal votes		34,010	97.2	
Informal votes		994	2.8	
Turnout		35,004	90.6	
Two-party-preferred result
Labor	Bill Riordan		63.4	+9.3
Country	Thomas Halloran		36.6	−9.3
Labor hold		Swing	+9.3	

=== Elections in the 1950s ===
==== 1958 ====
1958 Australian federal election: Kennedy
Party	Candidate	Votes	%	±%
Labor	Bill Riordan	16,075	50.9	−7.3
Country	Alexander Hindson	10,466	33.2	−8.6
Queensland Labor	Bob Katter, Sr.	5,026	15.9	+15.9
Total formal votes		31,567	97.1	
Informal votes		947	2.9	
Turnout		32,514	88.1	
Two-party-preferred result
Labor	Bill Riordan		54.1	−4.1
Country	Alexander Hindson		45.9	+4.1
Labor hold		Swing	−4.1	

==== 1955 ====
1955 Australian federal election: Kennedy
Party	Candidate	Votes	%	±%
Labor	Bill Riordan	17,366	58.2	−1.8
Country	Timothy Donnelly	12,457	41.8	+1.8
Total formal votes		39,823	97.8	
Informal votes		658	2.2	
Turnout		30,481	90.4	
Labor hold		Swing	−1.8	

==== 1954 ====
1954 Australian federal election: Kennedy
Party	Candidate	Votes	%	±%
Labor	Bill Riordan	17,585	60.2	+0.0
Country	Cliff Lanham	11,650	39.8	+0.0
Total formal votes		29,235	98.9	
Informal votes		332	1.1	
Turnout		29,567	92.6	
Labor hold		Swing	+0.0	

==== 1951 ====
1951 Australian federal election: Kennedy
Party	Candidate	Votes	%	±%
Labor	Bill Riordan	16,700	60.2	+5.1
Country	Ulick Browne	11,038	39.8	−1.7
Total formal votes		27,738	98.3	
Informal votes		494	1.7	
Turnout		28,232	90.5	
Labor hold		Swing	+1.8	

=== Elections in the 1940s ===
==== 1949 ====
1949 Australian federal election: Kennedy
Party	Candidate	Votes	%	±%
Labor	Bill Riordan	15,127	55.1	−3.2
Country	Ulick Browne	11,397	41.5	+4.6
Communist	Eric Wyper	947	3.4	−0.4
Total formal votes		27,471	98.1	
Informal votes		533	1.9	
Turnout		28,004	89.3	
Two-party-preferred result
Labor	Bill Riordan		58.4	−3.7
Country	Ulick Browne		41.6	+3.7
Labor hold		Swing	−3.7	

==== 1946 ====
1946 Australian federal election: Kennedy
Party	Candidate	Votes	%	±%
Labor	Bill Riordan	25,404	57.5	−7.7
Country	Clement Cummings	18,769	42.5	+18.7
Total formal votes		44,173	97.5	
Informal votes		1,120	2.5	
Turnout		45,293	84.0	
Labor hold		Swing	−14.2	

==== 1943 ====
1943 Australian federal election: Kennedy
Party	Candidate	Votes	%	±%
Labor	Bill Riordan	29,551	65.2	+1.0
Country	Wilfrid Simmonds	10,769	23.8	−12.0
Independent	Athena Deane	3,753	8.3	+8.3
Independent	Richard Vane-Millbank	1,265	2.8	+2.8
Total formal votes		45,338	96.8	
Informal votes		1,483	3.2	
Turnout		46,821	88.0	
Two-party-preferred result
Labor	Bill Riordan		71.7	+7.5
Country	Wilfrid Simmonds		28.3	−7.5
Labor hold		Swing	+7.5	

==== 1940 ====
1940 Australian federal election: Kennedy
Party	Candidate	Votes	%	±%
Labor	Bill Riordan	29,988	64.2	+0.2
Country	Wilfrid Simmonds	16,706	35.8	+4.6
Total formal votes		46,694	97.5	
Informal votes		1,209	2.5	
Turnout		47,903	88.7	
Labor hold		Swing	−2.2	

=== Elections in the 1930s ===
==== 1937 ====
1937 Australian federal election: Kennedy
Party	Candidate	Votes	%	±%
Labor	Bill Riordan	30,356	64.0	+4.3
Country	Alex Kippen	14,812	31.2	+31.2
Social Credit	Herbert Price	2,269	4.8	+4.8
Total formal votes		47,437	97.0	
Informal votes		1,443	3.0	
Turnout		48,880	91.3	
Two-party-preferred result
Labor	Bill Riordan		66.4	+2.5
Country	Alex Kippen		33.6	−2.5
Labor hold		Swing	+2.5	

==== 1936 by-election ====
1936 Kennedy by-election
Party	Candidate	Votes	%	±%
Labor	Bill Riordan	19,111	47.4	−12.3
Independent Labor	Jim Boyd	13,223	32.8	+32.8
Communist	Jim Slater	4,459	11.1	+6.4
Social Credit	James Killoran	3,565	8.8	+8.8
Total formal votes		40,358	96.2	
Informal votes		1,581	3.8	
Turnout		41,939	81.8	
Two-party-preferred result
Labor	Bill Riordan	23,188	57.5	−6.4
Independent Labor	Jim Boyd	17,170	42.5	+42.5
Labor hold		Swing	−6.4	

==== 1934 ====
1934 Australian federal election: Kennedy
Party	Candidate	Votes	%	±%
Labor	Darby Riordan	27,290	59.7	+0.2
United Australia	Jim Clarke	16,275	35.6	−4.9
Communist	Jim Slater	2,172	4.7	+4.7
Total formal votes		45,737	96.9	
Informal votes		1,452	3.1	
Turnout		47,189	88.5	
Two-party-preferred result
Labor	Darby Riordan		63.9	+4.4
United Australia	Jim Clarke		36.1	−4.4
Labor hold		Swing	+4.4	

==== 1931 ====
1931 Australian federal election: Kennedy
Party	Candidate	Votes	%	±%
Labor	Darby Riordan	17,605	60.2	+7.1
United Australia	Jim Clarke	11,655	39.8	−7.1
Total formal votes		29,260	96.3	
Informal votes		1,112	3.7	
Turnout		30,372	88.3	
Labor hold		Swing	+7.1	

=== Elections in the 1920s ===
==== 1929 ====
1929 Australian federal election: Kennedy
Party	Candidate	Votes	%	±%
Labor	Darby Riordan	15,392	53.1	+5.5
Nationalist	Grosvenor Francis	13,593	46.9	−5.5
Total formal votes		28,985	95.3	
Informal votes		1,436	4.7	
Turnout		30,421	89.9	
Labor gain from Nationalist		Swing	+5.5	

==== 1928 ====
1928 Australian federal election: Kennedy
Party	Candidate	Votes	%	±%
Nationalist	Grosvenor Francis	14,336	52.4	−47.6
Labor	Jim Riordan	13,041	47.6	+47.6
Total formal votes		27,377	94.7	
Informal votes		1,527	5.3	
Turnout		28,904	88.5	
Nationalist hold		Swing	−47.6	

==== 1925 ====
1925 Australian federal election: Kennedy
Party	Candidate	Votes	%	±%
Nationalist	Grosvenor Francis	unopposed		
Nationalist gain from Labor		Swing		

==== 1922 ====
1922 Australian federal election: Kennedy
Party	Candidate	Votes	%	±%
Labor	Charles McDonald	14,824	61.6	+0.8
Country	Robert Nowland	9,257	38.4	+37.0
Total formal votes		24,081	94.8	
Informal votes		1,333	5.2	
Turnout		25,414	74.8	
Labor hold		Swing	+0.7	

=== Elections in the 1910s ===
==== 1919 ====
1919 Australian federal election: Kennedy
Party	Candidate	Votes	%	±%
Labor	Charles McDonald	13,360	61.7	−1.1
Nationalist	James Suter	8,283	38.3	+1.1
Total formal votes		21,643	96.8	
Informal votes		704	3.2	
Turnout		22,347	76.4	
Labor hold		Swing	−1.1	

==== 1917 ====
1917 Australian federal election: Kennedy
Party	Candidate	Votes	%	±%
Labor	Charles McDonald	15,346	62.8	−37.2
Nationalist	Hubert Sizer	9,076	37.2	+37.2
Total formal votes		24,422	97.3	
Informal votes		667	2.7	
Turnout		25,089	79.8	
Labor hold		Swing	−37.2	

==== 1914 ====
1914 Australian federal election: Kennedy
Party	Candidate	Votes	%	±%
Labor	Charles McDonald	unopposed		
Labor hold		Swing		

==== 1913 ====
1913 Australian federal election: Kennedy
Party	Candidate	Votes	%	±%
Labor	Charles McDonald	17,745	74.4	+6.1
Liberal	Owen Edwards	6,112	25.6	−6.1
Total formal votes		23,857	95.9	
Informal votes		1,013	4.1	
Turnout		24,870	70.7	
Labor hold		Swing	+6.1	

==== 1910 ====
1910 Australian federal election: Kennedy
Party	Candidate	Votes	%	±%
Labour	Charles McDonald	8,729	64.8	+7.0
Liberal	John Houghton	4,742	35.2	−7.0
Total formal votes		13,471	95.7	
Informal votes		605	4.3	
Turnout		14,076	61.5	
Labour hold		Swing	+7.0	

=== Elections in the 1900s ===
==== 1906 ====
1906 Australian federal election: Kennedy
Party	Candidate	Votes	%	±%
Labour	Charles McDonald	6,462	57.8	−11.9
Anti-Socialist	Frederick Johnson	4,711	42.2	+11.9
Total formal votes		11,173	93.0	
Informal votes		845	7.0	
Turnout		12,018	48.4	
Labour hold		Swing	−11.9	

==== 1903 ====
1903 Australian federal election: Kennedy
Party	Candidate	Votes	%	±%
Labour	Charles McDonald	8,031	69.7	+6.8
Protectionist	Frederick Johnson	3,493	30.3	−6.8
Total formal votes		11,524	96.5	
Informal votes		423	3.5	
Turnout		11,947	60.6	
Labour hold		Swing	+6.8	

==== 1901 ====
1901 Australian federal election: Kennedy
Party	Candidate	Votes	%	±%
Labour	Charles McDonald	3,936	62.9	+62.9
Free Trade	Maurice Barnett	2,325	37.1	+37.1
Total formal votes		6,261	98.1	
Informal votes		123	1.9	
Turnout		6,384	66.5	
Labour win		(new seat)		
