= Electoral results for the district of Niddrie =

Victoria, Australia, district election results

This is a list of electoral results for the Electoral district of Niddrie in Victorian state elections.

== Members for Niddrie ==
Member	Party	Term
Jack Simpson	Labor	1976–1988
Bob Sercombe	Labor	1988–1996
Rob Hulls	Labor	1996–2012
Ben Carroll	Labor	2012–present

== Election results ==
=== Elections in the 2020s ===
2022 Victorian state election: Niddrie
Party	Candidate	Votes	%	±%
Labor	Ben Carroll	18,567	43.9	−10.9
Liberal	Alan Youhana	14,344	34.0	−0.3
Greens	Declan McGinness	3,117	7.4	+0.5
Freedom	Frank Maugeri	1,899	4.5	+4.5
Democratic Labour	Holly Kruse	1,172	2.8	+2.8
Family First	Joanne Garcia	1,096	2.6	+2.6
Victorian Socialists	Brad Reich	966	2.3	+2.3
Animal Justice	Shannon Meilak	812	1.9	−1.9
New Democrats	Georgia Grammenos	269	0.6	+0.6
Total formal votes		42,242	93.9	–0.4
Informal votes		2,763	6.1	+0.4
Turnout		45,005	90.0	
Two-party-preferred result
Labor	Ben Carroll	23,949	56.7	−5.8
Liberal	Alan Youhana	18,293	43.3	+5.8
Labor hold		Swing	−5.8	

=== Elections in the 2010s ===
2018 Victorian state election: Niddrie
Party	Candidate	Votes	%	±%
Labor	Ben Carroll	21,042	54.79	+8.64
Liberal	Ben Reeson	13,121	34.16	−3.36
Greens	Jean-Luke Desmarais	2,629	6.85	−1.26
Animal Justice	Rebbecca Primmer	1,615	4.21	+4.20
Total formal votes		38,407	94.38	+0.78
Informal votes		2,289	5.62	−0.78
Turnout		40,696	91.01	−3.35
Two-party-preferred result
Labor	Ben Carroll	24,021	62.59	+4.88
Liberal	Ben Reeson	14,358	37.41	−4.88
Labor hold		Swing	+4.88	

2014 Victorian state election: Niddrie
Party	Candidate	Votes	%	±%
Labor	Ben Carroll	17,342	46.2	+2.8
Liberal	Rebecca Gauci Maurici	14,101	37.5	+0.6
Greens	Sarah Roberts	3,045	8.1	+0.0
Independent	Andrea Surace	1,002	2.7	+2.7
Voice for the West	Paddy Dewan	892	2.4	+2.4
Independent	Andrew Gunter	478	1.3	+1.3
Christians	John Warner	394	1.1	+1.0
Independent	Appollo Yianni	323	0.9	+0.9
Total formal votes		37,577	93.6	+1.3
Informal votes		2,572	6.4	−1.3
Turnout		40,149	94.4	+1.9
Two-party-preferred result
Labor	Ben Carroll	21,686	57.7	+3.2
Liberal	Rebecca Gauci Maurici	15,891	42.3	−3.2
Labor hold		Swing	+3.2	

2012 Niddrie state by-election
Party	Candidate	Votes	%	±%
Labor	Ben Carroll	12,941	46.8	+1.1
Independent	Andrea Surace	3,443	12.5	+12.5
Greens	Josie Lester	2,865	10.4	+2.7
Sex Party	Amy Myers	2,245	8.1	+8.1
Independent	Jim Little	1,924	7.0	+2.2
Christian Democrats	Frank Papafotiou	1,588	5.8	+5.8
Democratic Labour	Michael Deverala	1,322	4.8	+4.8
Independent	Gerrit Schorel-Hlavka	946	3.4	+3.4
Independent	David Linaker	357	1.3	+1.3
Total formal votes		27,631	88.5	−3.2
Informal votes		3,584	11.5	+3.2
Turnout		31,215	84.8	−8.8
Two-candidate-preferred result
Labor	Ben Carroll	18,565	67.2	+10.2
Independent	Andrea Surace	9,066	32.8	+32.8
Labor hold				

2010 Victorian state election: Niddrie
Party	Candidate	Votes	%	±%
Labor	Rob Hulls	14,435	45.68	−8.08
Liberal	Joh Bauch	11,000	34.81	+3.34
Greens	Leharna Black	2,451	7.76	−1.37
Independent	Jim Little	1,516	4.80	+4.80
Family First	Mark Markovic	1,263	4.00	−1.65
Independent	Steve Medcraft	499	1.58	+1.58
Independent	Brian Roberts	162	0.51	+0.51
Independent	John Nott	140	0.44	+0.44
Independent	Robert Livesay	131	0.41	+0.41
Total formal votes		31,597	91.69	−2.06
Informal votes		2,865	8.31	+2.06
Turnout		34,462	93.63	+0.12
Two-party-preferred result
Labor	Rob Hulls	18,105	56.95	−4.27
Liberal	Joh Bauch	13,687	43.05	+4.27
Labor hold		Swing	−4.27	

=== Elections in the 2000s ===
2006 Victorian state election: Niddrie
Party	Candidate	Votes	%	±%
Labor	Rob Hulls	17,034	53.8	−6.3
Liberal	James Buonopane	9,972	31.5	+2.0
Greens	Gwen Lee	2,893	9.1	+1.8
Family First	Mark Markovic	1,789	5.6	+5.6
Total formal votes		31,688	93.7	−1.9
Informal votes		2,113	6.3	+1.9
Turnout		33,801	93.5	
Two-party-preferred result
Labor	Rob Hulls	19,396	61.2	−5.4
Liberal	James Buonopane	12,288	38.8	+5.4
Labor hold		Swing	−5.4	

2002 Victorian state election: Niddrie
Party	Candidate	Votes	%	±%
Labor	Rob Hulls	19,952	60.1	+3.9
Liberal	Susan Jennison	9,810	29.5	−13.6
Greens	Matthew Klugman	2,414	7.3	+7.3
Democratic Labor	Pat Crea	1,035	3.1	+3.1
Total formal votes		33,211	95.6	−0.5
Informal votes		1,527	4.4	+0.5
Turnout		34,738	94.2	
Two-party-preferred result
Labor	Rob Hulls	22,114	66.6	+10.2
Liberal	Susan Jennison	11,088	33.4	−10.2
Labor hold		Swing	+10.2	

=== Elections in the 1990s ===
1999 Victorian state election: Niddrie
Party	Candidate	Votes	%	±%
Labor	Rob Hulls	17,761	56.8	+2.4
Liberal	Susannah Kruger	13,525	43.2	−2.4
Total formal votes		31,286	96.2	−0.7
Informal votes		1,252	3.8	+0.7
Turnout		32,538	96.3	
Labor hold		Swing	+2.4	

1996 Victorian state election: Niddrie
Party	Candidate	Votes	%	±%
Labor	Rob Hulls	16,446	54.4	+6.9
Liberal	Stan Mihaloglou	13,804	45.6	+5.2
Total formal votes		30,250	96.9	+2.1
Informal votes		977	3.1	−2.1
Turnout		31,227	95.3	
Labor hold		Swing	+0.8	

1992 Victorian state election: Niddrie
Party	Candidate	Votes	%	±%
Labor	Bob Sercombe	13,827	47.4	−6.8
Liberal	David Davis	11,799	40.5	+2.3
Independent	Sam Ortisi	2,021	6.9	+6.9
Independent	Dorothy Costa	961	3.3	+3.3
Independent	Maria Ferrigno	551	1.9	+1.9
Total formal votes		29,159	94.8	+0.4
Informal votes		1,597	5.2	−0.4
Turnout		30,756	96.0	
Two-party-preferred result
Labor	Bob Sercombe	15,594	53.6	−4.4
Liberal	David Davis	13,503	46.4	+4.4
Labor hold		Swing	−4.4	

=== Elections in the 1980s ===
1988 Victorian state election: Niddrie
Party	Candidate	Votes	%	±%
Labor	Bob Sercombe	14,717	54.23	−8.76
Liberal	Susan Feltham	10,336	38.09	+1.08
Independent	Lance Hutchinson	2,083	7.68	+7.68
Total formal votes		27,136	94.35	−2.06
Informal votes		1,625	5.65	+2.06
Turnout		28,761	93.91	−1.27
Two-party-preferred result
Labor	Bob Sercombe	15,763	58.11	−4.88
Liberal	Susan Feltham	11,365	41.89	+4.88
Labor hold		Swing	−4.88	

1985 Victorian state election: Niddrie
Party	Candidate	Votes	%	±%
Labor	Jack Simpson	17,177	63.0	+0.6
Liberal	Mark Pallett	10,094	37.0	+9.0
Total formal votes		27,271	96.4	
Informal votes		1,016	3.6	
Turnout		28,287	95.2	
Labor hold		Swing	−5.2	

1982 Victorian state election: Niddrie
Party	Candidate	Votes	%	±%
Labor	Jack Simpson	17,395	61.6	+6.8
Liberal	Brian Dodgson	8,234	29.2	−4.2
Democrats	Frank Trifiletti	2,613	9.3	+3.8
Total formal votes		28,242	96.1	−0.1
Informal votes		1,146	3.9	+0.1
Turnout		29,388	95.9	+0.2
Two-party-preferred result
Labor	Jack Simpson	18,897	66.9	+7.2
Liberal	Brian Dodgson	9,345	33.1	−7.2
Labor hold		Swing	+7.2	

=== Elections in the 1970s ===
1979 Victorian state election: Niddrie
Party	Candidate	Votes	%	±%
Labor	Jack Simpson	14,701	54.8	+5.9
Liberal	Roslyn Crago	8,974	33.4	−9.6
Independent	Cecil Kirchner	1,692	6.3	+6.3
Democrats	Bruce McNeill	1,476	5.5	+5.5
Total formal votes		26,843	96.2	−0.5
Informal votes		1,057	3.8	+0.5
Turnout		27,900	95.7	−0.1
Two-party-preferred result
Labor	Jack Simpson	16,020	59.7	+7.7
Liberal	Roslyn Crago	10,823	40.3	−7.7
Labor hold		Swing	+7.7	

1976 Victorian state election: Niddrie
Party	Candidate	Votes	%	±%
Labor	Jack Simpson	12,571	48.9	−4.0
Liberal	Peter Kirchner	11,067	43.0	+6.4
Independent	Lancelot Hutchinson	2,078	8.1	+8.1
Total formal votes		25,716	96.7	
Informal votes		876	3.3	
Turnout		26,592	95.8	
Two-party-preferred result
Labor	Jack Simpson	13,378	52.0	−2.1
Liberal	Peter Kirchner	12,338	48.0	+2.1
Labor hold		Swing	−2.1	
