= Carl Katter =

Australian activist (born 1978)

- Carl Katter speaking at a pro-gay marriage rally in Melbourne, 2011

Convenor of the Australian Marriage Equality Group in Victoria
- In office 18 December 2012 – 30 January 2013
- Preceded by: Branch established
- Succeeded by: Tim Peppard and Christine Cooke

Personal details
- Born: Carl Robert Katter; 12 January 1978 (age 48) Brisbane, Queensland, Australia
- Party: Labor
- Relations: Bob Katter Jr. (half-brother); Robbie Katter (half–nephew); Alex Douglas (half–nephew); See Katter family
- Parent(s): Bob Katter Sr. Joycelyn Steel
- Education: St. Columba Catholic College
- Alma mater: Griffith University; Queensland University of Technology
- Occupation: Government representative (Department of Conservation, Environment and Planning)
- Profession: Activist; Public servant
- Website: Victorian Labor profile

Carl Robert Katter (born 12 January 1978) is an Australian political activist who was the Labor Party's candidate for the seat of Higgins in the 2016 federal election. Katter is also known for having been involved in the push for LGBT rights during his political career.

== Early years and background ==
Carl Katter was born in Brisbane, Queensland, and grew up in the north of the state including Charters Towers. His parents were federal MP Bob Katter Sr. and Joy Katter, and he is a member of a pioneering Queensland family. Katter came out as gay at the age of 18. Growing up gay in rural North Queensland, he felt he often experienced negative attitudes from some of those in his community that existed towards gay people at the time.

Bob Katter Sr, Carl's father, who died when Carl was 12 years old, was a member of the Australian Parliament representing the federal electorate of Kennedy. The younger Katter was heavily influenced by his father's labour and trade unionist politics, and by his father's belief in equality for people of all races.

== Activism ==
In August 2011, Bob Katter Jr, Katter's half-brother and member of Parliament representing the seat of Kennedy, like his father before him, appeared at a right wing Christian rally at the Great Hall in Parliament House and decried same-sex marriage. Carl reportedly watched on television as his half-brother mocked same-sex marriage and suggested that it "deserves to be laughed at and ridiculed."

Deciding publicly to come out regarding his own homosexuality, Katter joined the push for the legalisation of same-sex marriage in Australia. He approached GetUp!, an independent Australian grass-roots community advocacy organisation, and with their help produced an online video message to counter his brother's comments. In a television interview with George Negus, Katter criticized his brother's remarks, saying that "it's hurtful, it's dangerous, and it's really inappropriate."

Katter has stated that he believes that it is better to combat his brother's views and educate rather than attack his brother on a personal level. He holds the work that his brother has done for the Kennedy electorate and elsewhere in high regard.

== Recognition ==
In 2011, Katter was included in The Age's Top 100 most influential Melburnians.

== Engagement ==
Katter was a guest speaker at the Metropolitan Community Church's 2011 annual Christmas event, hosted by Justice Michael Kirby, where he gave a speech about marriage equality.

== Political career ==
Katter was the Labor candidate for Higgins for the 2016 federal election. He won 15% of the vote.

== See also ==
- Political families of Australia
