= 1936 Kennedy by-election =

- 12 December 1936
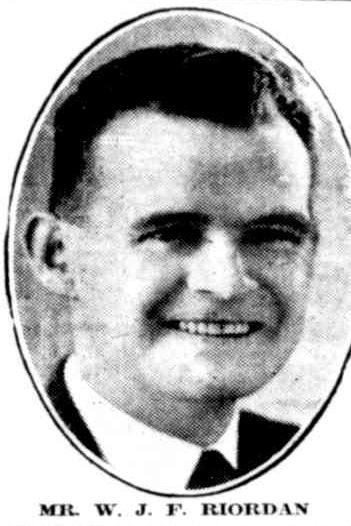
	First party	Second party	Third party
		LAB	CPA
Candidate	Bill Riordan	Jim Boyd	Jim Slater
Party	Labor	Ind. Labor	Communist
Popular vote	19,111	13,223	4,459
Percentage	47.4%	32.8%	11.1%
Swing	▼12.3pp	▲32.8pp	▲8.8pp
TPP	57.5%	42.5%
TPP swing	▼6.4pp	▲42.5pp
MP before election
Darby Riordan
Labor
Elected MP
Bill Riordan
Labor

A by-election was held for the Australian House of Representatives seat of Kennedy on 12 December 1936. This was triggered by the death of Labor MP Darby Riordan.

The by-election was won by the Labor candidate, Riordan's nephew Bill.

== Results ==
Kennedy by-election, 1936
Party	Candidate	Votes	%	±%
Labor	Bill Riordan	19,111	47.4	−12.3
Independent Labor	Jim Boyd	13,223	32.8	+32.8
Communist	Jim Slater	4,459	11.1	+6.4
Social Credit	James Killoran	3,565	8.8	+8.8
Total formal votes		40,358	96.2	
Informal votes		1,581	3.8	
Turnout		41,939	81.8	
Two-party-preferred result
Labor	Bill Riordan	23,188	57.5	−6.4
Independent Labor	Jim Boyd	17,170	42.5	+42.5
Labor hold		Swing	−6.4	
