= Jim Riordan =

Australian politician and judge

The Honourable Jim Riordan
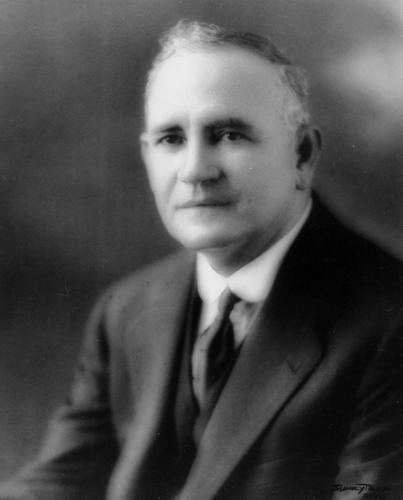

Member of the Queensland Legislative Council
- In office 10 October 1917 – 23 March 1922

Personal details
- Born: William James Riordan; 20 April 1882 Mackay, Queensland, Australia
- Died: 15 September 1955 (aged 73) Brisbane, Queensland, Australia
- Resting place: Lutwyche Cemetery
- Party: Labor
- Spouse(s): Annie Helen Page (m.1907 d.1941), Lyla Elizabeth Boland (m.1943 d.2000)
- Relations: Darby Riordan (brother), Ernest Riordan (brother), Bill Riordan, (son)
- Occupation: Trade union organiser

William James Riordan (20 April 1882 – 15 September 1955) was an Australian politician and judge.

== Early life ==
He was born in Mackay to William Riordan and Mary, née Walsh. After attending Mackay State School he became a labourer on the Cairns–Mulgrave railway line and then a fireman for the Chillagoe Railway Company. While there he became President of the Chillagoe Amalgamated Workers' Union and in 1903 an organiser with the Far North Australia Workers' Union (FNAWU). On 28 March 1907 he married Annie Helen Page, with whom he had a son and two daughters.

== Politics ==
In 1916 he became state president of the FNAWU, and in 1917 was appointed to the Queensland Legislative Council for the Labor Party.

Riordan served in the council until its abolition, according to Labor policy, in 1922. In 1925 he moved from president to secretary of the FNAWU, a position he held until 1933 when he was appointed to the Queensland Industrial Court. He was also involved in the Labor press as director of The Daily Standard and The Worker, which were published in Brisbane. He served on the court until 1953, and from 1951 to 1952 was chairman of the Royal Commission on Off-Course Betting.

== Later life ==
He had remarried, to Lyla Elizabeth Boland on 2 October 1943. He died in Brisbane in 1955 and was buried in Lutwyche Cemetery.

His brothers Darby and Ernest were also politicians, Darby as federal member for Kennedy from 1929 to 1936 and Ernest as a Queensland MLA from 1936 to 1944 and from 1950 to 1954. Jim Riordan's son Bill was elected to the seat of Kennedy on Darby's death in 1936.
