= Bob Katter Sr. =

Australian politician (1918–1990)

The Honourable Bob Katter Sr.
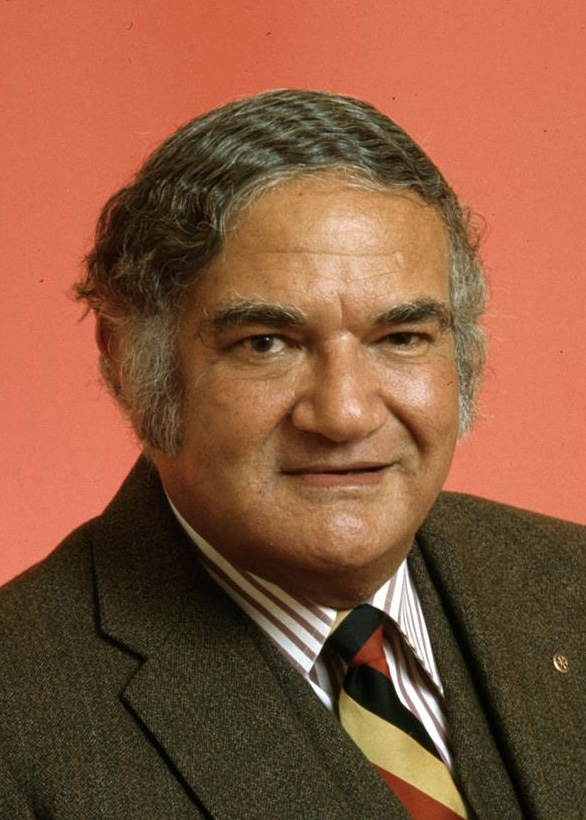
- Katter in 1974

Minister for the Army
- In office 2 February 1972 – 5 December 1972
- Prime Minister: William McMahon
- Preceded by: Andrew Peacock
- Succeeded by: Lance Barnard

Member of the Australian Parliament for Kennedy
- In office 26 November 1966 – 19 February 1990
- Preceded by: Bill Riordan
- Succeeded by: Rob Hulls

Personal details
- Born: Cummin Robert Katter; 5 September 1918 South Brisbane, Queensland, Australia
- Died: 18 March 1990 (aged 71) Mount Isa, Queensland, Australia
- Party: National
- Other political affiliations: Labor (1946–1957); Queensland Labor (1957–1966)
- Spouses: Mabel Horn (m. 1943; d. 1971) Joycelyn Steel (m. 1976)
- Relations: Robbie Katter (grandson); See Katter family
- Children: 6; including Bob Jr. and Carl
- Education: Mount Carmel College
- Alma mater: University of Queensland
- Occupation: General goods merchant and fashion proprietor (J. & R. D. Arida, Cloncurry) (self-employed)
- Profession: Trade unionist, businessman and politician

Military service
- Allegiance: Commonwealth of Australia
- Branch/service: Australian Army
- Years of service: 1940–1942
- Rank: Captain
- Unit: 9th Infantry Battalion; 2nd Division
- Service no.: Q15621
- Other offices: 1987–1990: Ambassador, Australian Tourist Commission; 1972–1987: Parliamentary Representative, United Nations Road Safety Collaboration; 1949–1952, 1964–1967: Chair, Cloncurry Shire Council

Robert Cummin Katter (born Cummin Robert Katter; 5 September 1918 – 18 March 1990) was an Australian politician who served in the House of Representatives from 1966 to 1990, representing the National Party (originally named the Country Party). He served as Minister for the Army in the McMahon government in 1972. His sons Bob Katter Jr. and Carl Katter as well as grandson Robbie have also been involved in politics.

== Early years ==
Katter was born on 5 September 1918 in South Brisbane, Queensland, the fourth child of Vivian Bridget (née Warby) and Carlyle Assad Khittar, later Carl Robert Katter. His father was a Maronite Catholic born in Bcharre, Mount Lebanon Mutasarrifate, although "Assyria" is what Katter stated in his naturalisation documents and his mother was Australian born to parents also from Mount Lebanon. He has been described as a cousin of the Lebanese-American poet Khalil Gibran. His father was one of the two-dozen original investors in the airline Qantas. He was raised and educated "probably by the nuns" in Cloncurry and later at Mount Carmel College in Charters Towers. He began legal studies at the University of Queensland and resided at St Leo's College (when the college was at Wickham Terrace).

With the outbreak of World War II, he served in the Australian Army as a lieutenant from 1940 and was promoted to captain in 1942. In July 1942, his service was terminated on grounds of ill health. Later he was proprietor of the local drapery business, menswear store and picture theatre in Cloncurry, Queensland. One of his first actions in taking over the cinema was to remove the steel railings which separated the Aboriginal patrons from other cinema-goers, and to remove the hard chairs, so that everyone was forced to share the canvas seats normally reserved for European Australians.

Katter served on Cloncurry Shire Council for over twenty years. He was a Councillor from 1946 to 1967 and was its Chairman from 1948 to 1951 and again from 1964 to 1967.

Katter married his first wife, Mabel Horn, in 1944, and they were married until she died in 1971. Bob Jr, Norman and Geraldine are his children from his first marriage. Katter remarried in 1976 to Joycelyn Steel. Carl, Richard and Bernadette are his children from his second marriage.

== Political career ==
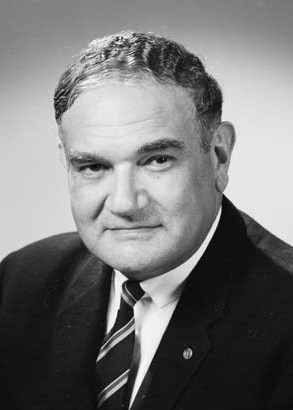
Katter in 1967

Katter was at one time a member of the Australian Labor Party and a union delegate on the Brisbane wharves and had a long history of active unionism prior to his entry into public life. Bob Katter Sr. was a member of the executive of the State Service Union in Queensland and was also a member of the executive of the tally clerks division of the Federated Clerks' Union of Australia in Queensland. He left the ALP in 1957, when the Queensland Labor Party split from the federal party, running under that party's banner for the state seat of Flinders in that year's state election. Later, he joined the Liberal Party.

In 1966, he joined the Country Party, later the National Party, and won Country preselection for Kennedy, a mostly rural seat in northern Queensland. On paper, he faced daunting odds. The seat had been in Labor hands for all but two terms since Federation, and it had been one of the few country seats in which Labor consistently did well. At the time of the election, Labor held the seat with a 13 percent majority. However, Katter won on the third count, after Democratic Labor Party candidate Edward Bennett's preferences flowed mostly to him, allowing him to take the seat on a 15 percent swing, becoming only the second non-Labor member ever to win it.

A 1969 redistribution cut out Labor-voting Bowen, replacing it with conservative-leaning Charters Towers. This allowed him to consolidate his hold on the seat, and he became the first non-Labor candidate in four decades to win a primary vote majority in Kennedy. He would not face another serious contest again until 1987, the first time since his initial run for the seat that he failed to win enough primary votes to retain the seat outright. He retired in 1990.

He was Minister for the Army from February 1972 to the McMahon government's defeat at the December 1972 election. From 1976 to 1983, he was Chairman of the House of Representatives Standing Committee on Road Safety and was a strong advocate for the introduction of random breath-testing in Queensland and other states in which it had not already been implemented.

He also served as Chair of the Joint Standing Committee on Foreign Affairs Defence and Trade. He served two terms as Australian Parliamentary representative to the United Nations. Katter was appointed by the Australian Tourist Commission as an ambassador to the United States for tourism after the success of the film "Crocodile" Dundee there in 1986.

He played a major role in establishing the Stockman's Hall of Fame at Longreach and was its founding chairman.

He chose not to contest the 24 March 1990 election, and he retired when the Parliament was dissolved on 19 February. He died a month later, a week before the election. He was survived by his second wife, two sons and a daughter from his first marriage, and two sons and a daughter from his second marriage.

Despite his many years as a member of the Country/National Party, he was said to have lived and died a Labor man. Indeed, he retained elements of 1950s Labor policies in his platform, including opposition to neoliberalism.

== Notable descendants ==
Several of his descendants have carried on his legacy and entered into Australian politics.

- Robert Carl "Bob" Katter Jr, son of Bob Katter Sr, is the current federal member for Kennedy and leader of Katter's Australian Party.
- Carl Katter, son of Bob Katter Sr, 2016 Australian Labor Party candidate for the federal seat of Higgins in Victoria.
- Robbie Katter, grandson of Bob Katter Sr and son of Bob Katter Jr, became the first member of Katter's Australian Party elected to the Queensland State Parliament.

== See also ==
- Political families of Australia

== Notes ==
Political offices
Preceded by Andrew Peacock	Minister for the Army; 1972	Succeeded by Lance Barnard
Parliament of Australia
Preceded by Bill Riordan	Member for Kennedy; 1966–1990	Succeeded by Rob Hulls
