= 2012 Niddrie state by-election =

- 24 March 2012

Electoral district of Niddrie in the Victorian Legislative Assembly
- Turnout: 84.8% (▼8.8%)

	First party	Second party	Third party
		IND
Candidate	Ben Carroll	Andrea Surace	Josie Lester
Party	Labor	Independent	Greens
Primary vote	12,941	3,443	2,865
Percentage	46.8%	12.5%	10.4%
Swing	▼1.1	▲12.5	▲2.7
TCP	67.2%	32.8%
TCP swing	▲10.2	▲32.8
MP before election
Rob Hulls
Labor
Elected MP
Ben Carroll
Labor

A by-election for the Victorian Legislative Assembly district of Niddrie was held on 24 March 2012. The by-election was triggered by the resignation on 27 January 2012 of Rob Hulls, the former Deputy Premier of Victoria, who had held the seat since 1996. The Labor Party retained the seat.

== Key dates ==
The by-election was held on 24 March, the same day as the 2012 Queensland state election.

- 23 February: Issue of writ
- 24 February: Nominations opened
- 1 March: Close of electoral roll
- 7 March: Close of nominations for party candidates
- 8 March: Close of nominations for independent candidates
- 9 March: Early voting commenced
- 22 March: Close of postal voting
- 23 March: Early voting closes
- 24 March: Polling day

== Candidates ==
Candidates who nominated for the by-election are (in ballot paper order):

Candidate nominations
Independent	Gerrit Schorel-Hlavka
Labor Party	Ben Carroll
Independent	Andrea Surace
Independent	David Linaker
Greens	Josie Lester
Democratic Labor Party	Michael Deverala
Australian Sex Party	Amy Myers
Independent	Jim Little
Christian Democratic Party	Frank Papafotiou

The Liberal Party who contested the seat at the previous election and gained 34.8 percent of the primary and 43.1 percent of the two-party vote did not run a candidate.

The unregistered Australian Democrats nominated Rob Livesay as a candidate, however the party failed to correctly lodge the nomination form, with one of Livesay's supporting signatories not listed on the electoral roll in the district.

== Results ==
Niddrie state by-election, 2012
Party	Candidate	Votes	%	±%
Labor	Ben Carroll	12,941	46.8	+1.1
Independent	Andrea Surace	3,443	12.5	+12.5
Greens	Josie Lester	2,865	10.4	+2.7
Sex Party	Amy Myers	2,245	8.1	+8.1
Independent	Jim Little	1,924	7.0	+2.2
Christian Democrats	Frank Papafotiou	1,588	5.8	+5.8
Democratic Labor	Michael Deverala	1,322	4.8	+4.8
Independent	Gerrit Schorel-Hlavka	946	3.4	+3.4
Independent	David Linaker	357	1.3	+1.3
Total formal votes		27,631	88.5	−3.2
Informal votes		3,584	11.5	+3.2
Turnout		31,215	84.8	−8.8
Two-candidate-preferred result
Labor	Ben Carroll	18,565	67.2	+10.2
Independent	Andrea Surace	9,066	32.8	+32.8
Labor hold				
