= Bob Katter =

Australian politician (born 1945)

The Honourable Bob Katter MP
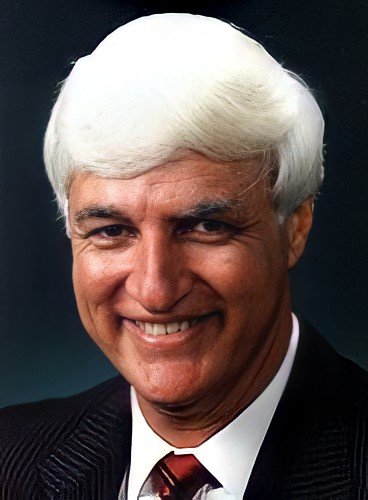
- Official portrait, 1993

Father of the House
- Current
- Assumed role 11 April 2022
- Preceded by: Kevin Andrews

Leader of the Katter's Australian Party
- In office 5 June 2011 – 3 February 2020
- Preceded by: Party established
- Succeeded by: Robbie Katter

Member of the Australian Parliament for Kennedy
- Incumbent
- Assumed office 13 March 1993
- Preceded by: Rob Hulls
State positions 1974–1992
Minister for Mines and Energy and Northern and Regional Development
In office 25 September 1989 – 7 December 1989
Premier	Russell Cooper
Preceded by	Martin Tenni (Mines and Energy); Tom Gilmore (Northern Development, Community Services, and Ethnic Affairs)
Succeeded by	Rob Borbidge (Minerals); Tony McGrady; Keith De Lacy (Regional Development)
Minister for Community Services and Ethnic Affairs
In office 19 January 1989 – 28 August 1989
Premier	Mike Ahern
Preceded by	Himself (Northern Development, Community Services, and Ethnic Affairs)
Succeeded by	Tom Gilmore
Minister for Northern Development, Community Services and Ethnic Affairs
In office 9 December 1987 – 19 January 1989
Premier	Mike Ahern
Preceded by	Tom Gilmore
Succeeded by	Martin Tenni (Northern Development, Mines, and Energy); Himself (Community Services and Ethnic Affairs)
Minister for Northern Development and Community Services
In office 6 February 1986 – 1 December 1987
Premier	Joh Bjelke-Petersen
Preceded by	Himself (Northern Development and Aboriginal and Island Affairs)
Succeeded by	Bill Gunn
Minister for Northern Development and Aboriginal and Island Affairs
In office 7 November 1983 – 6 February 1986
Premier	Joh Bjelke-Petersen
Preceded by	Val Bird
Succeeded by	Himself (Northern Development and Community Services)
Member of the Queensland Parliament for Flinders
In office 7 December 1974 – 19 September 1992
Preceded by	Bill Longeran
Succeeded by	Seat abolished

Personal details
- Born: Robert Bellarmine Carl Katter; 22 May 1945 (age 81) Cloncurry, Queensland, Australia
- Party: Katter's Australian (since 2011)
- Other political affiliations: National (Note: Known as the Country Party and the National Country Party until 1982) (until 2001); Independent (2001–2011)
- Spouse: Susan O'Rourke (m. 1970)
- Relations: Carl Katter (half-brother); Alex Douglas (nephew); See Katter family
- Children: Robbie
- Parent(s): Bob Katter Sr.
- Education: Mount Carmel College; St Columba Catholic College
- Website: Official website

Military service
- Branch/service: Australian Army Reserve
- Years of service: 1964–1972
- Rank: Second Lieutenant
- Unit: 49th Battalion, Royal Queensland Regiment
- Other offices: 1983–1989: Chair, National Party Water Resources Committee (Qld); 1968–1973: Delegate, National Party State Council; 1972–1974: Branch President, National Country Party

Robert Bellarmine Carl Katter (born 22 May 1945) is an Australian politician. He has been the member of Parliament (MP) for the Queensland division of Kennedy since 1993 and is the father of the House, being the longest-serving member of the Australian Parliament. Prior to federal politics, Katter was prominent in Queensland state politics, serving as a minister in the Bjelke-Petersen, Ahern, and Cooper governments.

The son of politician Bob Katter Sr., Katter was born in Cloncurry, Queensland, and attended the University of Queensland and worked in small businesses, later joining the National Party. He was first elected to the Queensland Legislative Assembly for the electorate of Flinders at the 1974 state election. Katter was appointed cabinet minister by Premier Joh Bjelke-Petersen in 1983, and continued to serve as a minister under premiers Mike Ahern and Russell Cooper until the National Party's defeat at the 1989 state election.

Katter retired from state parliament in 1992 and was elected to the House of Representatives at the subsequent federal election, standing for his father's former seat of Kennedy. He resigned from the National Party in the lead-up to the 2001 federal election over policy disagreements, and has continued to be re-elected as an independent and as the founder of his Katter's Australian Party. His son Robbie Katter is a state MP in Queensland, the third generation of the Katter family to become a member of Parliament.

== Early life ==
Robert Bellarmine Carl Katter was born on 22 May 1945 in Cloncurry, Queensland. He is the eldest of three children born to Robert Cummin Katter (1918–1990) and Mabel Joan Katter (née Horn; 1919–1971). After his mother's death, Katter's father had three children with his second wife, including Carl Katter. Katter Sr. was a member of the Queensland Labor Party until 1957, when he left during the party's split that year. He later joined the Country Party, now the National Party.

Katter's father was raised in Cloncurry, where he ran a clothing shop and managed a local cinema. He was elected to Cloncurry Shire Council in 1946, and later to federal parliament in 1966. Katter is of Lebanese descent through his paternal grandfather, Carl Robert Katter (originally spelled "Khittar"), who was born in Bsharri and immigrated to Australia with his parents in 1898. He was naturalised in 1907, after initially being refused naturalisation under the White Australia policy.

Katter received his early education in Cloncurry, where he was one of only six at his school who completed Year 12 education. He attended Mount Carmel College in Charters Towers, and went on to the University of Queensland, where he studied law, but later dropped out without graduating. While at university, Katter was president of the University of Queensland Law Society and St Leo's College. As a university student, Katter pelted the Beatles with rotten eggs during their 1964 tour of Australia, declaring in a later meeting with the band that he undertook this as "an intellectual reaction against Beatlemania". He also served in the Citizens Military Forces, with the rank of second lieutenant.

After his military service, Katter returned to Cloncurry, where he worked at his family's businesses, and as a labourer at the Mount Isa Mines.

== State politics (1974–1992) ==
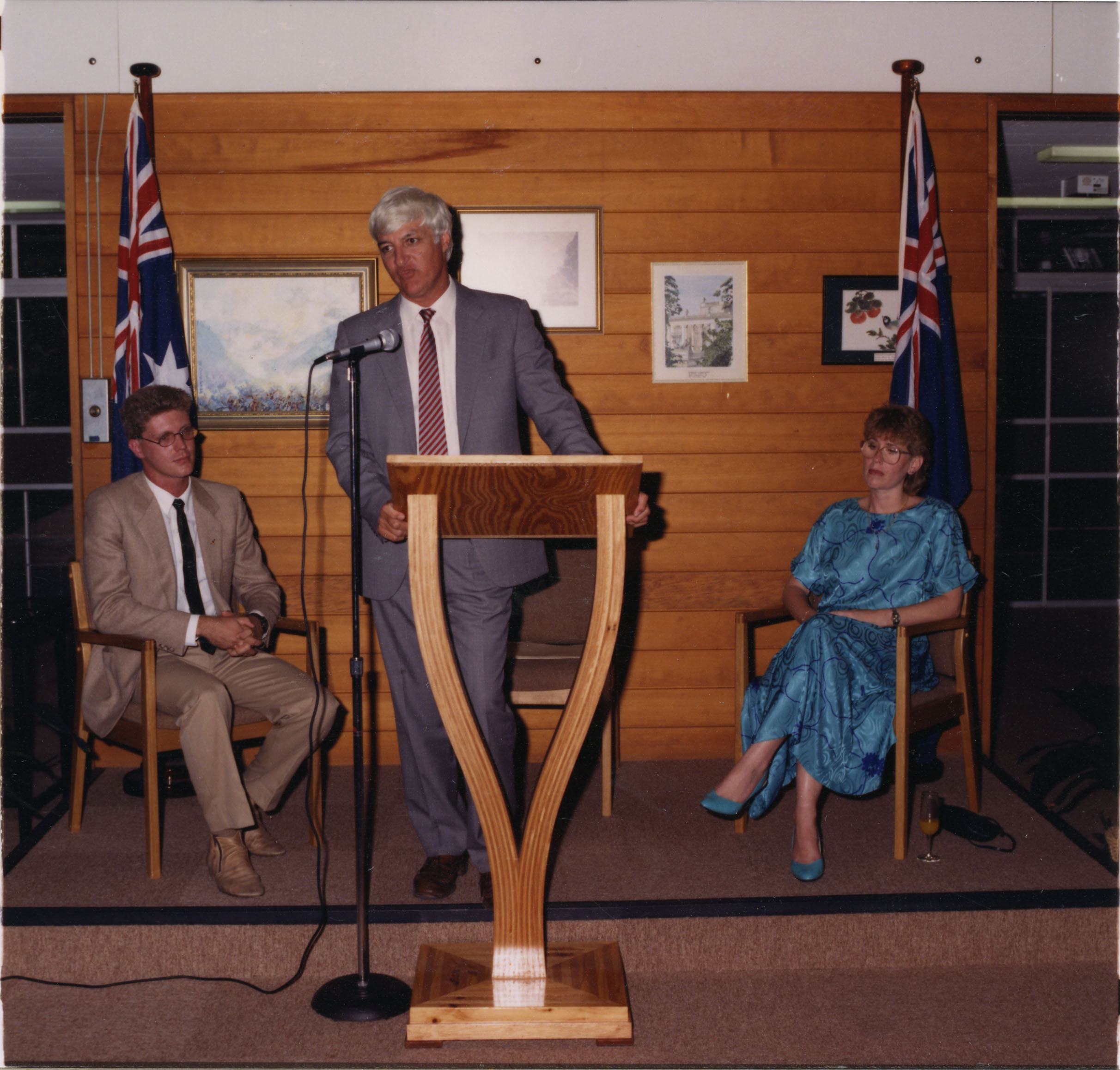
Katter in 1988

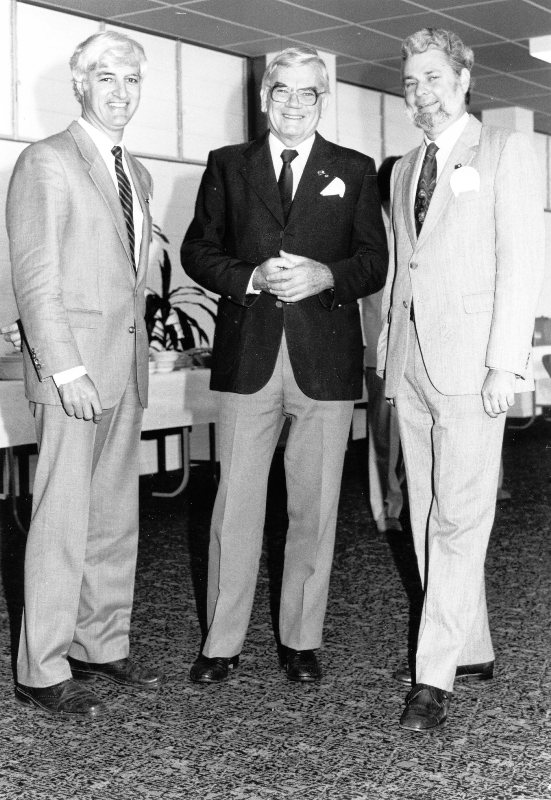
Katter (left) at a Queensland Day ceremony with Mike Reynolds (right) c. 1986.

Katter was first elected to the north Queensland district of Flinders of the Legislative Assembly of Queensland at the 1974 state election, as a member of the Country Party. He served as Minister for Northern Development and Aboriginal and Islander Affairs from 1983 to 1987, Minister for Northern Development, Community Services and Ethnic Affairs from 1987 to 1989, Minister for Community Services and Ethnic Affairs in 1989, Minister for Mines and Energy in 1989, and Minister for Northern and Regional Development for a brief time in 1989 until the National government was defeated at the 1989 election.

Katter was a strong supporter of Premier Joh Bjelke-Petersen. On 28 August 1989, he resigned abruptly from the cabinet of Bjelke-Petersen's successor, Mike Ahern, along with fellow cabinet ministers Russell Cooper and Paul Clauson. Their resignations were reportedly an attempt to depose Ahern as party leader. Bjelke-Petersen subsequently endorsed Katter to succeed Ahern as leader and premier.

Katter returned to cabinet on 25 September 1989, following Cooper's successful ousting of Ahern as party leader and premier. As the Minister for Mines, he was the subject of a no-confidence motion from the Queensland Chamber of Mines in November 1989, following his proposed changes to mining legislation which were perceived to favour the interests of graziers over mining companies. His term as a minister ended following the National Party's defeat at the 1989 election.

Following the abolition of the electoral district of Flinders in 1992, Katter retired from state politics and did not contest the 1992 election.

== Federal politics (1993–present) ==
=== Nationals MP (1993–2001) ===
Following his father's retirement from federal parliament, Katter was an unsuccessful candidate at the National Party preselection for the seat of Kennedy for the 1990 federal election.

At the 1993 federal election, Katter won his father's former seat of Kennedy in the House of Representatives defeating Rob Hulls.

In 1994, Katter advocated against the Human Rights (Sexual Conduct) Act 1994, a federal law that bypassed Tasmania's anti-gay laws, claiming the government was "helping the spread of AIDS" and legitimizing "homosexual behavior". He also believed the laws jeopardized states' rights in Australia.

Katter was re-elected with a large swing in 1996, and was re-elected with a similar margin in 1998. However, after his transfer to federal politics, Katter found himself increasingly out of sympathy with the Liberal–National Coalition due to his disagreements with its neoliberal stances on economic and social issues, leading to his eventual resignation from the National Party in 2001.

=== Independent MP (2001–2011) ===
Following his resignation from the Nationals, Katter easily retained his seat as an independent at the general elections in 2001, 2004, 2007 and 2010, each time winning with a percentage vote in the high sixties after preferences were distributed.

In the aftermath of the 2010 hung federal election, Katter offered a range of views on the way forward for government. Two other former National Party MPs, both independents from rural electorates, Tony Windsor and Rob Oakeshott decided to support a Labor government. Katter presented his 20 points document and requested for the major parties to respond before deciding which party he would support. As a result, he broke with Windsor and Oakeshott and supported the Liberal–National coalition for government. On 7 September 2010, Katter announced his support for a Coalition minority government.

=== Katter's Australian Party (2011–present) ===
On 5 June 2011, Katter launched a new political party, Katter's Australian Party, which he said would "unashamedly represent agriculture". He made headlines after singing to his party's candidates during a meeting on 17 October 2011, saying it was his "election jingle".

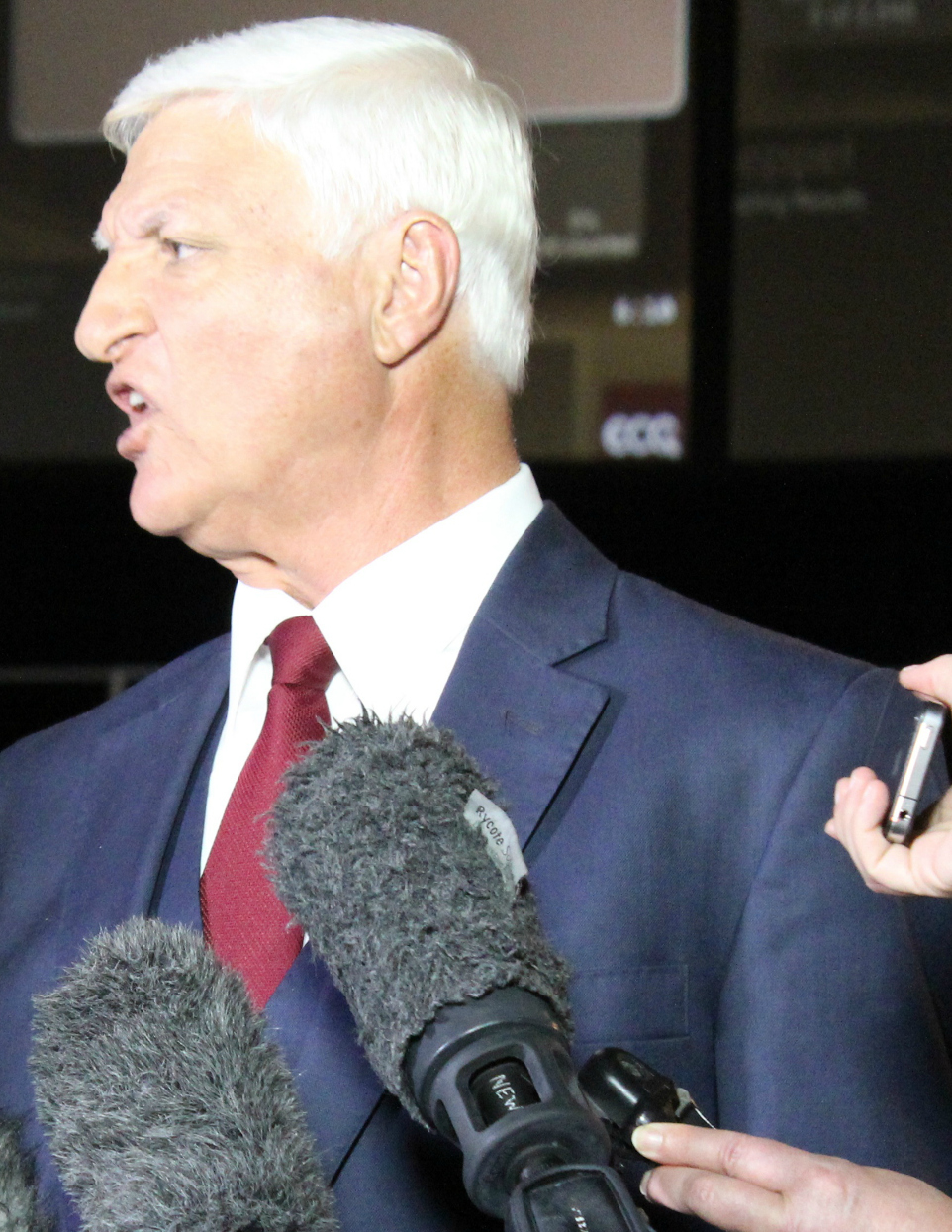
Katter in 2012

At the 2013 election, however, Katter faced his first serious contest since his initial run for Kennedy in 1993. He had gone into the election holding the seat with a majority of 18 percent, making it the second-safest seat in the country. However, reportedly due to anger at his decision to support Kevin Rudd for prime minister following Julia Gillard's live cattle export ban (Rudd, within weeks, reopened the live export market), Katter still suffered a primary-vote swing of over 17 points. In the end, Katter was re-elected on the preferences of Labor voters, suffering a two-party swing of 16 points to the Liberal National Party.

At the 2016 election, Katter retained his seat of Kennedy, with an increased swing of 8.93 points toward him.

On 15 August 2017, Katter announced that the Turnbull government could not take his support for granted in the wake of the 2017 Australian parliamentary eligibility crisis, which ensued over concerns that several MPs held dual citizenship and thus may be constitutionally ineligible to be in Parliament. Katter added that if one of the affected MPs, Deputy Prime Minister Barnaby Joyce, lost his seat, the Coalition could not count on his support for confidence and supply.

In November 2018, Katter secured funds for three inland dam-irrigation schemes in North Queensland.

At the 2019 election, Katter was returned to his seat of Kennedy with a swing of 2.9 points towards him, in spite of a redistribution of his electorate. In the 2022 election, he was re-elected again, and became the Father of the Australian House of Representatives following the retirement of Kevin Andrews.

In July 2024 it was announced that a portrait of Katter has been commissioned to be hung in the federal parliament. It was unveiled in November 2025.

At the 2025 election, he was re-elected at a margin of 31.5 points and a swing of 2.65 points towards him.

In May 2026, the Australian Monarchist League (AML) began legal action against Katter over his refusal to make and subscribe the Oath or Affirmation of Allegiance as required by section 42 of the Constitution. In July 2025 Katter made the statement that he has never sworn allegiance to a monarch in his 50 years in politics. In an open letter issued to Katter on 28 May 2026, the AML warned that the matter could be taken to the high court based on legal advice. The letter quoted King's Counsel Neville Rochow and barrister Hannah March,

“We are of the opinion that Mr Katter is not a Member of the House of Representatives in the 48th Parliament, Mr Katter did not make the Oath or Affirmation of Allegiance as required by s 42 of the Constitution. We are aware that Hansard records the Oath or Affirmation of Allegiance as having been made by Mr Katter, but it is clear on the evidence that Hansard is wrong in so recording. Mr Katter’s failure to comply with s 42 and the operation of s 38 of the Constitution entail that the seat of Kennedy is vacant.”

In a letter issued to the league on 8 September 2025 by the Speaker of the House of Representatives, Milton Dick, he stated that the Clerk could not decipher one way or another any language used when Katter made the oath and that the oath form was signed with no amendments.

== Political views ==
Katter is an agrarian socialist and socially conservative. Like his father, his views on economic matters echo 1950s "Old Labor" policy as it was before the 1955 Labor Party split. He opposes privatisation and economic deregulation, and strongly supports traditional Country Party statutory marketing. In 1994, he cited his political heroes as ALP figures Jack Lang and Ted Theodore and U.S. president Franklin D. Roosevelt, but said Lang was ultimately a failure and that he was "aiming to be a John McEwen". The sobriquet 'Mad Katter' (in reference to the character from Lewis Carroll's Alice's Adventures in Wonderland) was coined by his opponents to describe his nationalistic developmentalism.

As of 2020, Katter described himself as belonging to the "hard left", citing his continuing membership of the Construction, Forestry, Maritime, Mining and Energy Union (CFMEU). In a 2022 interview with The Chaser, Katter claimed that he had never pledged allegiance to the Australian monarchy when entering Parliament.

=== Abortion ===
In 1980, Katter seconded a motion by Don Lane calling on the Queensland state government to "protect the lives of unborn Queensland children being killed by abortion".

In 2006, Katter voted against a federal bill which would increase the availability of abortion drugs.

=== Environmental issues ===
Katter has opposed enacting climate change legislation to control emissions. He advocates for measures that reduce carbon footprints. Katter has championed the mandating of ethanol fuel content. He has additionally pioneered protests against imported bananas, and is an opponent of the concentration of the Australian supermarket industry amongst Coles and Woolworths.

Katter is a vocal advocate of stronger wildlife management, frequently highlighting the dangers posed by feral dogs, venomous snakes, and crocodiles to residents and tourists in Northern Queensland. Katter has expressed alarm over the rising population of saltwater crocodiles in Northern Queensland, which have made swimming and other recreational activities in or around natural bodies of water increasingly unsafe. Katter has strongly criticized the conservation policies of the Australian government, stating that "our lives are in danger because of protected wildlife" and has called for the protected status of saltwater crocodiles, and with it the ban on hunting the species, to be revoked. According to Katter, "a law that puts the value of a crocodile over a human being, that is the definition of evil".

=== Gun laws ===
An opponent of the tougher gun control laws introduced in the wake of the 1996 massacre in Port Arthur, Tasmania, Katter was accused in 2001 of signing a petition promoted by the Citizens Electoral Council (CEC), an organisation that claims the Port Arthur massacre was a conspiracy. He has stated that he always has and still believes there was no conspiracy.

==== 2016 campaign advertisement ====
In June 2016 during the lead-up to the 2016 federal election, Katter released a campaign ad that was criticised for its threatening overtones and its casual attitude towards gun violence. Set in the Australian bush, the ad features two men, their faces disguised by pantyhose and dressed in shirts labeled 'ALP' and 'LNP', pitching a sign reading "Australia for sale". Katter himself appears and takes it down, but the men return and put it back up. Katter, wearing a cowboy hat, defaces their sign with permanent marker so that it read, "Australia not for sale." Their back and forth ends with a close up shot of Katter brandishing a revolver, blowing smoke from the gun barrel and smiling, before the camera zooms out, revealing the two men from earlier, dead.

Although Katter said that he believed "most people would enjoy the humor" and that it was "terribly funny", Queensland senator Barry O'Sullivan called the ad "abhorrent", while Prime Minister Malcolm Turnbull said that it was "in the worst of taste". Journalist David Koch criticised the advert for its timing, having been released just days after the Pulse Nightclub shooting in Orlando, Florida. When the Huffington Post reached out to Katter for comment, asking him "whether gun violence is an appropriate message for a political ad" or "whether it means that Katter will aim to physically harm other politicians in the parliament", Katter responded with his own question, asking whether "the Huffington post would like [to] ban all Western cartoons", possibly in reference to the Charlie Hebdo terrorist attack in 2015. Katter also asked if he could add the reporter's name to the "Australian Inquisition for political correctness".

==== Bondi Beach shooting ====
In the wake of the 2025 Bondi Beach Shooting, Katter stated that the government response should focus on immigration and intelligence policy rather than gun control. Katter argued that further restrictions on gun ownership would fail to reduce gun violence and would ultimately be counter-productive, comparing them to Victorian era "sex bans". He has opposed the Albanese government's reforms for stricter gun laws in response to the shooting, including its national gun buyback program.

=== Immigration ===
In 2017, Katter called for a "Trump-like travel ban" in Australia after a New South Welshman was arrested on terrorism charges. That same year, Katter repeated a pledge used by the far-right organisation "Proud Boys", including that he was "a proud western chauvinist". When asked about the incident when it was publicised in 2019, Katter distanced himself from the group, saying "I don't know who this group is or anything about it".

Katter has supported and attended the 2025 March for Australia protests, calling for lowered immigration rates and immigration only from countries with democratic, egalitarian traditions and Christianity. In August 2025, he called a press conference in support of the rallies. When questioned by a reporter about his own Lebanese heritage, Katter threatened him and waved a fist in front of his face, telling him: "don't say that, because that irritates me, and I punch blokes in the mouth for saying that", and that his family has "been in this country since the dawn of time." However, months later in January 2026, Katter acknowledged his Lebanese heritage, stating that "my forbearers came from that area, because they wanted to get out of there". In regards to his previous statements on immigrants from the Middle East, Katter also recognized that "there are exceptions to the rule, no doubt".

=== Indigenous Australians ===
In 1987, as Queensland minister for Aboriginal and Islander affairs, Katter credited the state government with reducing Aboriginal deaths in custody by introducing "new detention procedures to divert people arrested for minor offences away from traditional custody after a three-hour cooling off period". In 1989, he opposed installing condom vending machines in Aboriginal and Torres Strait Islander communities to reduce the spread of AIDS, describing the plan instead as an attempt at eugenics, or "racist genocide".

Katter is also an opponent of voter identification laws, denouncing the Coalition's proposed introduction of them in 2021 as a racist system that would disenfranchise Aboriginal communities. In 2022, he announced that he would not support an Indigenous Voice to Parliament proposal, but did believe that the indigenous people of Australia deserved a referendum on how they should be represented in parliament.

=== LGBT rights ===
In November 1989, Katter claimed there were almost no homosexuals in North Queensland. He promised to walk backwards from Bourke across his electorate if they represented more than 0.001 percent of the population. Katter also said "mind you, if there are more, then I might take to walking backwards everywhere!" Katter voted against the Human Rights (Sexual Conduct) Act, 1994 (Cth), which decriminalised homosexuality in Tasmania. He does not support same-sex marriage. His response to the Australian Marriage Law Postal Survey result was the subject of international attention, as in response he declared that the issue of crocodiles killing people in North Queensland every three months was more pressing than same-sex marriage. Therefore he declared that "I ain't spending any time on it!" on the latter issue. In December 2017, Katter was one of only four members of the House of Representatives to oppose the Marriage Amendment (Definition and Religious Freedoms) Bill 2017 legalising same-sex marriage in Australia.

=== North Queensland statehood ===
Proposed flag for North Queensland designed by Katter in 2020.

Katter supports North Queensland statehood.

=== Republic ===
Katter supports Australia being a republic, arguing that national independence is inconsistent with allegiance to a foreign monarch.

== Personal life ==
Katter occasionally identifies as being an Aboriginal Australian and has described himself as a blackfella in federal parliament, in interviews, during television appearances and at public events. Katter claims that in his youth he was accepted as a member of the Kalkadoon tribe in the Cloncurry area, otherwise known as the "Curry mob", and said he has long since felt a deep connection with Aboriginal people.

Katter married Brisbane socialite Susan O'Rourke in 1970. They have five children together: one boy, Robbie, and four daughters. They also have fifteen grandchildren.

His son Robbie has been a member of the Queensland Legislative Assembly since 2012, representing Mount Isa from 2012 to 2017, and Traeger since 2017. He represents much of the territory that his father represented in state parliament.

Katter supports the North Queensland Cowboys for the National Rugby League (NRL).

Katter is Roman Catholic, with his father Bob Sr. and grandfather Carl being Roman Catholic and Maronite Catholic, respectively.

== Bibliography ==
- Katter, Bob (2012). An Incredible Race of People. Sydney: Pier 9 Books. ISBN 9781742665818. OCLC 795963853.
- Katter, Bob (2017). Conversations with Katter. Foreword by Elliot Hannay. Chatswood: New Holland Publishers. ISBN 9781921024399. OCLC 1023617539.

== See also ==
- Politics of Queensland
- Political families of Australia
- List of longest-serving members of the Parliament of Australia

== Notes ==
Parliament of Queensland
Preceded by William Lonergan	Member for Flinders; 1974–1992	District abolished
Political offices
Preceded by Val Bird	Minister for Northern Development and Aboriginal and Island Affairs; 1983–1986	Succeeded by Himself
Preceded by Val Bird	Minister for Northern Development and Aboriginal and Island Affairs; 1983–1986	Vacant Title next held by Anne Warner as Minister for Aboriginal and Islander Affairs
Preceded by Himself	Minister for Northern Development and Community Services; 1986–1987	Succeeded by Himself
Preceded by John Herbert as Minister for Community Services	Minister for Northern Development and Community Services; 1986–1987	Succeeded by Himself
Preceded by Himself	Minister for Northern Development, Community Services and Ethnic Affairs; 1987–1989	Succeeded by Himself
Preceded by Michael Ahern as Minister for Ethnic Affairs	Minister for Northern Development, Community Services and Ethnic Affairs; 1987–1989	Succeeded by Martin Tenni as Minister for Northern Development
Preceded by Himself	Minister for Community Services and Ethnic Affairs; 1989	Succeeded by Thomas Gilmore
Preceded by Martin Tenni	Minister for Mines and Energy; 1989	Succeeded by Thomas Gilmore as Minister for Mines
Preceded by Martin Tenni	Minister for Mines and Energy; 1989	Succeeded by Tony McGrady as Minister for Energy
Preceded by Thomas Gilmore	Minister for Northern and Regional Development; 1989	Succeeded by Keith De Lacy as Minister for Regional Development
Parliament of Australia
Preceded by Rob Hulls	Member for Kennedy; 1993–present	Incumbent
Preceded by Kevin Andrews	Father of the House of Representatives; 2022–present	Incumbent
Preceded by Kevin Andrews	Father of the Parliament; 2022–present	Incumbent
