= Charles McDonald (Australian politician) =

Australian politician (1860–1925)

The Honourable Charles McDonald
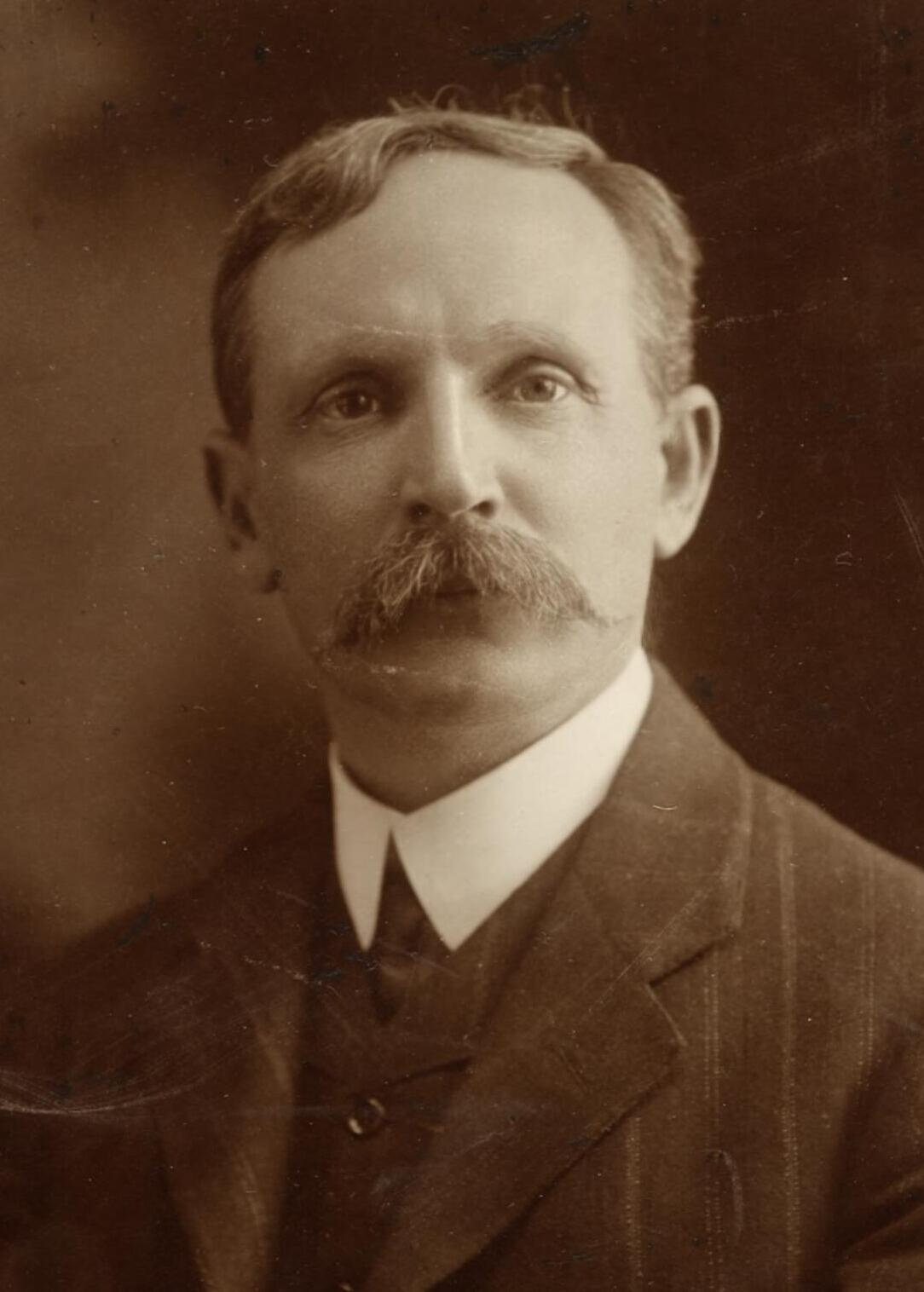
- Charles McDonald in 1908

Speaker of the Australian House of Representatives
- In office 1 July 1910 – 8 July 1913
- Preceded by: Carty Salmon
- Succeeded by: Elliot Johnson
- In office 8 October 1914 – 13 June 1917
- Preceded by: Elliot Johnson
- Succeeded by: Elliot Johnson

Member of the Australian Parliament for Kennedy
- In office 30 March 1901 – 13 November 1925
- Preceded by: New seat
- Succeeded by: Grosvenor Francis

Member of the Queensland Legislative Assembly for Flinders
- In office 20 May 1893 – 24 June 1901
- Preceded by: Louis Goldring
- Succeeded by: Peter Airey

Personal details
- Born: 25 August 1860 North Melbourne, Victoria, Australia
- Died: 13 November 1925 (aged 65) Melbourne, Victoria, Australia
- Resting place: Boroondara General Cemetery
- Party: Labor
- Spouse: Mary Ann Tregear (m. 1892)
- Occupation: Watchmaker

Charles McDonald (25 August 1860 – 13 November 1925) was an Australian politician who served in the House of Representatives from 1901 until his death, representing the Labor Party. He was Speaker of the House of Representatives from 1910 to 1913 and from 1914 to 1917. Before entering federal politics, McDonald had served in the Queensland Legislative Assembly from 1893 to 1901.

== Early life and career ==
McDonald was born on 25 August 1860 in North Melbourne, Victoria. He was the son of Harriet (née Pape) and Charles Thomas Young McDonald. His mother was born in England and his father in Scotland.

As a child, McDonald "moved between four colonies as new goldfields were discovered". He lived longest in Mudgee, New South Wales, attending Mudgee Public School where he excelled at history and geography. He began a printing apprenticeship after leaving school, later working in country New South Wales as a jeweller and watchmaker. In 1888, McDonald joined his father in Charters Towers, Queensland.

== Queensland Labor movement ==
McDonald was a watchmaker in Charters Towers in 1890 when he became the President of the Australian Labor Federation based in Brisbane. He played a leading role in the formation of the Australian Labor Party in Queensland.

McDonald was elected in 1893 as member for Flinders in the Legislative Assembly of Queensland. McDonald became known for his mastery of the Standing Orders. He was a member of the Queensland Executive between 1898 and 1903.

== Federal parliamentarian ==
In 1901, he successfully stood for the Division of Kennedy, a vast seat in the outback of western Queensland, in the first election for the Australian House of Representatives after Federation. McDonald was known as "Fighting Charlie" or "Fighting Mac" for his vigorous campaigning style. In one campaign, he reportedly rode over 3,000 miles (4,800 km) on bicycle on the rough outback roads.

McDonald became Chairman of Committees between 1906 and 1910. He became the first Labor Speaker in 1910 as Andrew Fisher formed the first Labor majority Government. He served in that position until Labor was narrowly defeated in the 1913 Federal election. McDonald was a confirmed republican who abandoned the traditional Speaker's wig and gown in favour of an ordinary business suit. All Labor Speakers have followed this tradition. He also removed the mace from the table.

The Liberal Government, which had only a slim majority, made an offer to McDonald to continue in the position, but he declined due to the interests of the Labor Party.

The Liberal Prime Minister Joseph Cook became frustrated by the Labor controlled Senate blocking his legislation and called for a double dissolution election. Labor won the election and McDonald became speaker again in 1914. He served as Speaker under the Labor, National Labor, and Nationalist governments until the 1917 election. During the parliamentary term, Labor split over the introduction of conscription in Australia. After the election, McDonald served on the opposition backbench.

His health was failing in the mid-1920s despite a trip to the United Kingdom in 1923. He died of cerebro-vascular disease on the day before the 1925 election, leading to his opponent Grosvenor Francis being declared elected unopposed.

McDonald had a state funeral and was buried in Boroondara General Cemetery. He was survived by his wife and daughter.

Australian painter Josephine Muntz Adams (1862-1949) painted a portrait of McDonald in 1916, which is now part of the Historic Memorials Collection at Parliament House in Canberra.

Parliament of Queensland
Preceded by Louis Goldring	Member for Flinders; 1893–1901	Succeeded by Peter Airey
Parliament of Australia
New division	Member for Kennedy; 1901–1925	Succeeded by Grosvenor Francis
Preceded by Carty Salmon	Speaker of the House; 1910–1913	Succeeded by Elliot Johnson
Preceded by Elliot Johnson	Speaker of the House; 1914–1917	Succeeded by Elliot Johnson
