= Jack Simpson (politician) =

Australian rules footballer and politician (1929–2015)

John Hamilton "Jack" Simpson (8 February 1929 – 19 May 2015) is a former Australian politician.

Simpson was born in Essendon to furniture retailer William Simpson and his wife Helen. He attended state schools and worked as a rouseabout at shearing sheds from 1944 to 1947 and then as a French polisher from 1948 to 1955. From 1955 to 1976 he managed the family furniture business at Moonee Ponds. He married Joyce Mavis Laurence on 22 February 1958; they had four daughters. He also had a career in the Victorian Football League, playing for Essendon from 1949 to 1951. Simpson also played in the Victorian Football Association for Williamstown 1952–1953 and Brunswick 1955–1956.

Simpson had joined the Labor Party in 1961, and in 1976 he was elected to the Victorian Legislative Assembly for Niddrie. In 1977 he became Shadow Minister for Public Works, moving to Police and Emergency Services in 1979. When Labor won government in 1982 he became Minister for Public Works and for Property and Services, exchanging Public Works for Labour and Industry in 1983. He stepped down from the front bench in 1985 and retired in 1988.

Victorian Legislative Assembly
New seat	Member for Niddrie; 1976–1988	Succeeded by Bob Sercombe
