= Bob Sercombe =

Australian politician (1949–2025)

Member of the Australian Parliament for Maribyrnong
- In office 2 March 1996 – 17 October 2007
- Preceded by: Alan Griffiths
- Succeeded by: Bill Shorten

Member of the Victorian Legislative Assembly for Niddrie
- In office 1 October 1988 – 5 February 1996
- Preceded by: Jack Simpson
- Succeeded by: Rob Hulls

Personal details
- Born: 3 April 1949 Melbourne, Victoria, Australia
- Died: 12 January 2025 (aged 75) Melbourne, Victoria, Australia
- Party: Australian Labor Party
- Education: University of Melbourne
- Occupation: Public servant

Robert Charles Grant Sercombe (3 April 1949 – 12 January 2025) was an Australian politician who represented the Division of Maribyrnong, Victoria for the Australian Labor Party from March 1996 until his retirement at the 2007 federal election.

== Life and career ==
Sercombe was born in Melbourne, Victoria, and was educated at the University of Melbourne. He was a public servant, social planner, and administrator before entering politics. He was an adviser to Clyde Holding, a former Victorian opposition leader and a minister in the Hawke government from 1983 until 1988. Sercombe was a member of the Essendon City Council in 1983 and 1984. Sercombe was the Member for Niddrie in the Victorian Legislative Assembly from 1988 until 1996. He was Deputy Leader of the Opposition 1993–94 and a member of the Opposition Shadow Ministry 1992–94.

In State politics, he became well known for supporting a leadership challenge on behalf of Ian Baker who attempted to topple then Leader John Brumby in 1994. After the bid failed, he did not contest the deputy leadership. In the federal Parliament, Sercombe was an Opposition Whip from 1998 until 2001. He was elected to the Opposition Shadow Ministry after the 2004 election and appointed Shadow Minister for Pacific Islands (assisting the Shadow Minister for Foreign Affairs, Kevin Rudd). His portfolio responsibilities were expanded some time later by Beazley to include Overseas Development. As Shadow Minister, Sercombe put out a series of policy announcements about expanding Australia's relationship with that region.

Within the Labor Party, Sercombe was for many years a leading member of the Labor Right in Victoria, although later became allied to the Left faction in Victoria while being a leading light of the Centre caucus in Canberra. Just prior to a local vote of ALP members, in February 2005 Sercombe announced he was withdrawing his candidacy from Labor preselection for his seat of Maribyrnong in favour of Australian Workers' Union National Secretary Bill Shorten as Shorten had the numbers over Sercombe to win the preselection and Shorten was elected unopposed as a result. He criticised challenges to other incumbent MPs. Despite announcing his retirement Sercombe was kept on the frontbench by Opposition Leader Kim Beazley until December 2006 when he was sacked by new leader Kevin Rudd. Sercombe was an Opposition frontbencher in both the Victorian State and Federal Parliaments but did not become a Minister in either tier of Government.

Sercombe died on 12 January 2025, at the age of 75.

Victorian Legislative Assembly
Preceded by Jack Simpson	Member for Niddrie; 1988–1996	Succeeded by Rob Hulls
Parliament of Australia
Preceded by Alan Griffiths	Member for Division of Maribyrnong; 1996–2007	Succeeded by Bill Shorten
