= Bill Riordan =

Australian politician (1908–1973)

The Honourable Bill Riordan CBE
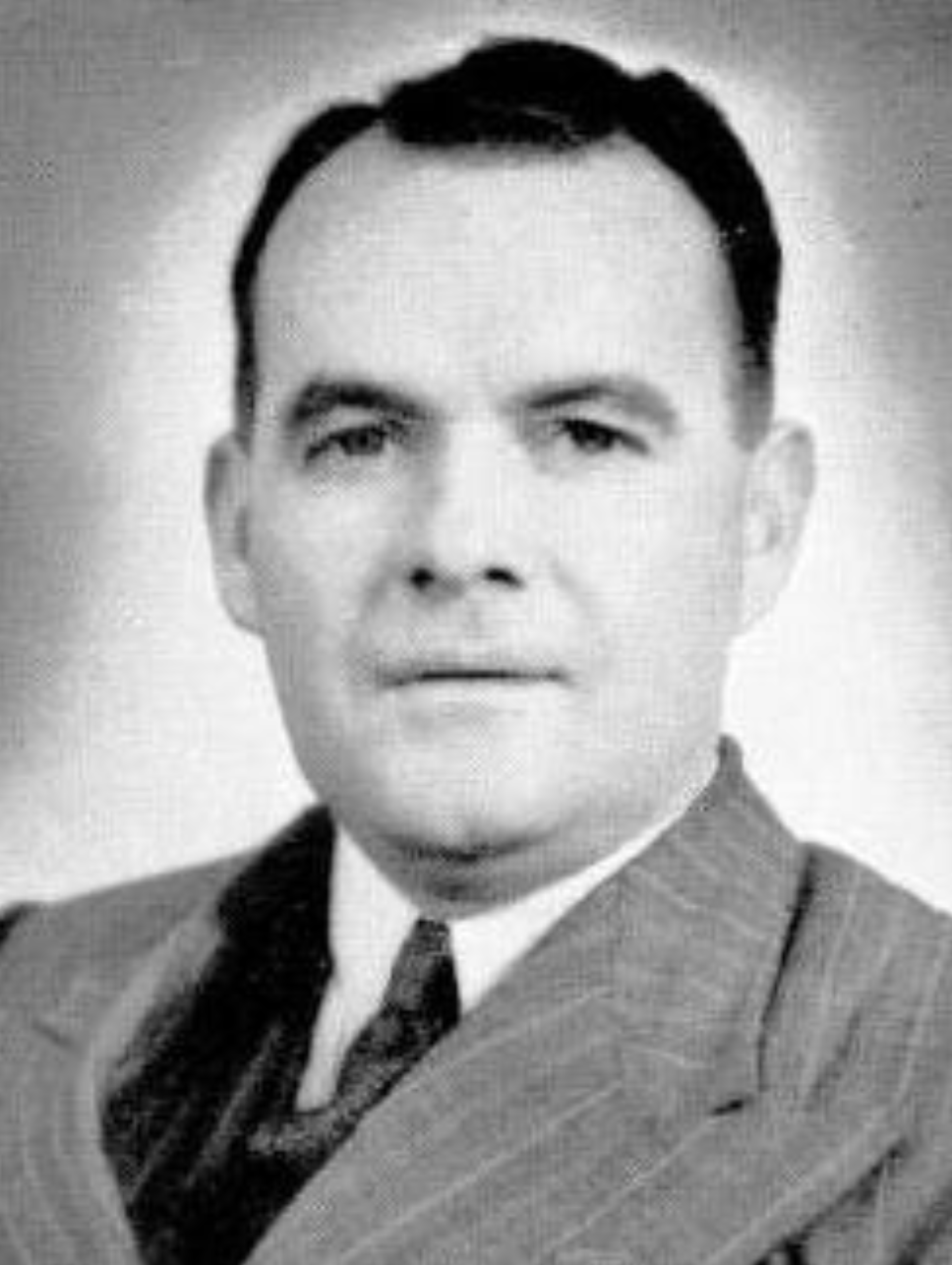

Minister for the Navy
- In office 1 November 1946 – 19 December 1949
- Prime Minister: Ben Chifley
- Preceded by: Arthur Drakeford
- Succeeded by: Josiah Francis

Member of the Australian Parliament for Kennedy
- In office 12 December 1936 – 31 October 1966
- Preceded by: Darby Riordan
- Succeeded by: Bob Katter

Personal details
- Born: 8 February 1908 Chillagoe, Queensland, Australia
- Died: 15 January 1973 (aged 64)
- Party: Labor
- Spouse: Kathleen Amelda Garvey
- Occupation: Political secretary

William James Frederick Riordan CBE (8 February 1908 – 15 January 1973) was an Australian politician. He was a member of the Australian Labor Party (ALP) and served in the House of Representatives from 1936 to 1966, representing the Division of Kennedy in Queensland. He was Minister for the Navy in the Chifley government from 1946 to 1949.

== Early life ==
Riordan was born in Chillagoe, Queensland, son of Jim Riordan (a member of the Queensland Legislative Council from 1917 to 1923) and nephew of Darby Riordan (member for Kennedy from 1929 to 1936) and Ernest Riordan (a member of the Legislative Assembly of Queensland from 1936). He was educated at state schools at Chillagoe, Mareeba and Gordonvale and at Brisbane Grammar School. He worked in the Queensland Department of Justice and then became secretary to his father when he was appointed to the Industrial Court of Queensland in 1933.

== Political career ==
On the death of his uncle Darby Riordan in 1936 he won the subsequent by-election for the Australian Labor Party and held the seat until his retirement before the 1966 election. He married Kathleen Amelda Garvey in December 1942—they had no children. From 1943 to 1946 he served as chairman of committees in the House of Representatives.

Riordan was appointed Minister for the Navy in the Chifley ministry from November 1946 to the defeat of the government at the 1949 election. Kennedy was a very large electorate, which meant Riordan had to travel constantly to meet his constituents, particularly workers in the sugar, mining and meat processing industries, in order to be re-elected. After his retirement his seat was won by the Country Party and has been held by Labor for only one parliamentary term since.

== Later life ==
Riordan was made a Commander of the Order of the British Empire (CBE) in 1967. He died of pneumonia at the Princess Alexandra Hospital and was buried in Nudgee Cemetery.

== Notes ==
Political offices
| Preceded by Arthur Drakeford | Minister for the Navy; 1946–1949 | Succeeded by Josiah Francis |
Parliament of Australia
| Preceded by Darby Riordan | Member for Kennedy; 1936–1966 | Succeeded by Bob Katter |
