= Grosvenor Francis =

Australian politician

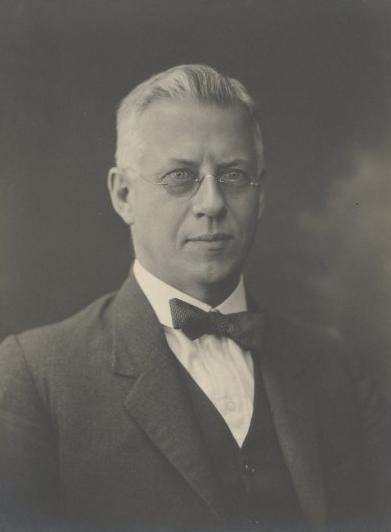

Member of the Australian Parliament for Kennedy
- In office 14 November 1925 – 12 October 1929
- Preceded by: Charles McDonald
- Succeeded by: Darby Riordan

Personal details
- Born: 14 August 1873
- Died: 30 November 1944 (aged 71)
- Party: Nationalist Party of Australia

Grosvenor Arundell Francis (14 August 1873 – 30 November 1944) was an Australian politician. He was the Nationalist Party member for the House of Representatives seat of Kennedy from 1925 to 1929.

Francis was brought up in Normanton, where his father was the local lands commissioner, and moved with his family as a child to Maryborough, Brisbane and Cunnamulla. He was educated at a preparatory school and then Brisbane Grammar School; he was in boarding school from age nine. He worked in "clerical and mercantile pursuits" at Cunnamulla for two years after finishing school, then worked for three years as a law clerk at Charleville. He did his articled clerkship at Charleville, was admitted as a solicitor in Brisbane, and then moved to Charters Towers, where he commenced practicing as a solicitor in 1901. In 1906, he entered into partnership with John Marsland in the firm of Marsland and Marsland, then one of the largest law firms in North Queensland; upon Marsland's retirement in 1913, Francis bought him out and continued practising under that name. A Freemason, he was the District Grand Master of Northern Queensland in 1922–23. He was also a director of the North Queensland Worsteel and Woollen Mills (Charters Towers), Ltd.

Francis was declared elected unopposed at the 1925 election when the sitting Labor member, Charles McDonald died on 13 November 1925, the day before the election. He was a member of the Public Accounts Committee from March 1927 and became committee chairman in August 1929. Francis was re-elected at the 1928 election, but was defeated by Darby Riordan at the 1929 election.

He resided in Canberra after his parliamentary defeat, where he entered into partnership with solicitor C. W. Davies and acquired, along with his son, an interest in a pastoral lease at Mount Stromlo. He sought to make a political comeback in 1931, contesting the Queensland seat of Herbert despite residing in Canberra; he was easily defeated. He also served as chairman of the Federal Capital Territory Rural Lessees Association until 1932. In 1932, he relocated to Sydney, where he formed the partnership of Francis and Francis along with his son, and continued as senior partner in that practice until shortly before his death. He also remained involved in Freemason Grand Lodges throughout his time in Canberra and New South Wales. He died in Sydney in 1944.

He married Florence M. Powell in 1902. They had three sons, Egbert, John and Grosvenor.

== Notes ==
Parliament of Australia
Preceded by Charles McDonald	Member for Kennedy; 1925–1929	Succeeded by Darby Riordan
