= Division of Kennedy =

Australian federal electoral division

Coordinates: 19.6°S 142.1°E

Kennedy Australian House of Representatives Division
- Interactive map of boundaries since the 2019 federal election
- Created: 1901
- MP: Bob Katter
- Party: Katter's Australian
- Namesake: Edmund Kennedy
- Electors: 123,724 (2025)
- Area: 567,377 km^{2} (219,065.5 sq mi)
- Demographic: Rural
Electorates around Kennedy:
Gulf of Carpentaria	Leichhardt	Coral Sea
Lingiari	Kennedy	Herbert; Dawson
Lingiari	Maranoa	Capricornia

The Division of Kennedy is an Australian electoral division in the state of Queensland. It is the state's second-largest division after the neighbouring Division of Maranoa, stretching from the Northern Territory border and the Gulf of Carpentaria to the Coral Sea, just southeast of Cairns and northwest of Townsville.

Since 1993 its MP has been Bob Katter, who has been Father of the House since 2022. Katter founded Katter's Australian Party in 2011, after sitting 10 years as an Independent following him leaving the National Party.

== Geography ==
The Division of Kennedy includes the regional city of Mount Isa in the west, as well as surrounding towns such as Cloncurry and Camooweal. In the Gulf of Carpentaria, it includes the Wellesley Islands. On the Pacific coast, it includes settlements such as Forrest Beach, Cardwell, Wongaling Beach and Mission Beach.

Since 1984, federal electoral division boundaries in Australia have been determined at redistributions by a redistribution committee appointed by the Australian Electoral Commission. Redistributions occur for the boundaries of divisions in a particular state, and they occur every seven years, or sooner if a state's representation entitlement changes or when divisions of a state are malapportioned.

== History ==
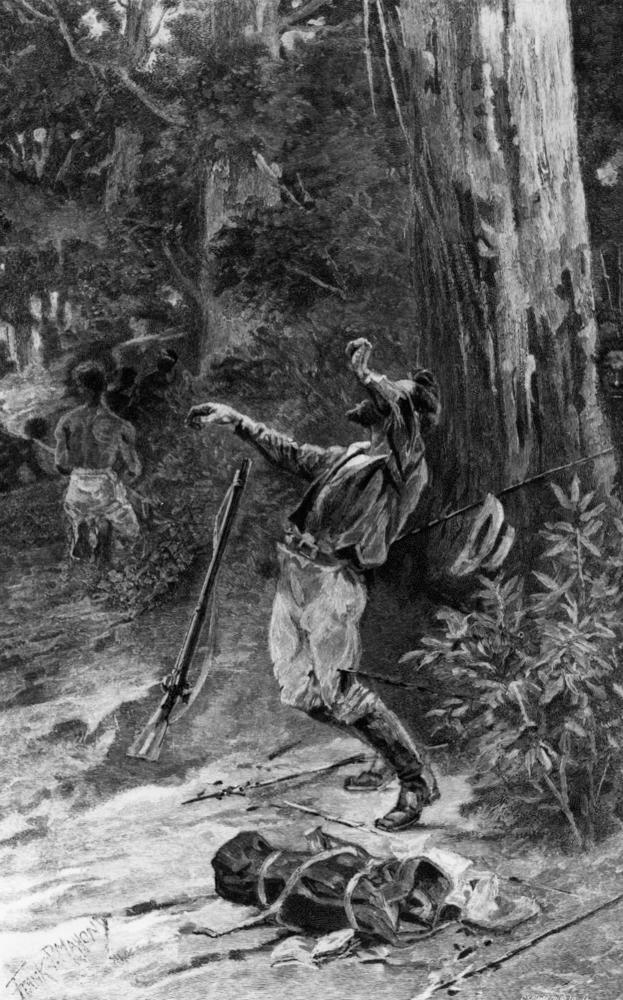
Edmund Kennedy, the division's namesake

The division was proclaimed in 1900, and was one of the original 65 divisions to be contested at the first federal election. It is named after Edmund Kennedy, an explorer in the area where the division is located in Queensland.

The member since 1993 is Bob Katter Jr., the leader of Katter's Australian Party. He was previously elected as a member of the National Party, but became an independent in 2001 before forming his own party in 2011.

Geographically, the electorate is rural. It takes in the Pacific coast of Queensland between Cairns and Townsville, including a small portion of Cairns itself, before sweeping westward to take in most of Queensland's northern outback—a large, increasingly sparsely populated area stretching west to the border with the Northern Territory. The largest population centre in the electorate is the city of Mount Isa, in its far west. Until 1949, the electorate was even larger, encompassing most of the state north of Townsville, becoming still larger when it absorbed Cairns in 1934. However, much of its northern portion, including the Cairns area, became the Division of Leichhardt in 1949.

Kennedy was held by the Australian Labor Party for most of the first half of the 20th century, and was one of the few country seats where Labor consistently did well. From Federation until 1966, Labor held it for all but two terms. However, since 1966 it has been held by the conservative Katter family—Bob Sr. and his son, Bob Jr.—for all but one term. It has long since shaken off its Labor past, and is now often colloquially nicknamed 'Katter Country'. A few Labor pockets still exist in Mount Isa, which was represented by Labor at the state level as late as 2012, as well as around Cairns and Townsville. However, they are no match for the heavily conservative bent of the rest of the seat, which is now considered one of the most overall conservative in Australia.

Besides the Katters, other prominent members include Charles McDonald, the first Labor Speaker of the Australian House of Representatives, and Bill Riordan, a minister in the Chifley government.

Darby Riordan held the seat from 1929 until his death in 1936. His nephew, Bill, won the seat at the ensuing by-election and held it until his retirement in 1966. Bob Katter Sr. won it in the 1966 Coalition landslide, holding it until 1990. His son and current member, Bob Jr. defeated his father's successor, Rob Hulls, in 1993. Hulls would later become Deputy Premier of Victoria.

At the 2013 election, sitting member Bob Jr. faced his first serious contest in two decades. He had gone into the election holding Kennedy with a margin of 18 per cent, making Kennedy the second-safest seat in Australia. However, Liberal National candidate Noeline Ikin was well ahead on the primary vote by 10,000 votes. Katter narrowly pulled through and won another term on Labor preferences. However, he suffered a swing of 17 per cent, reducing his majority to only 2.19 per cent.

Katter did not however face a rematch against Ikin at the 2016 election due to her having a brain tumour which forced her out of the election. (The tumour ultimately claimed Ikin's life in 2017.) At that election, Katter picked up a swing of almost nine per cent, making it a safe seat once again.

Kennedy was one of the 17 (out of 150) electorates that voted ‘no’ in the Australian Marriage Law Postal Survey.

== Members ==
Image	Member	Party	Term	Notes
	Charles McDonald (1860–1925)	Labor	30 March 1901 – 13 November 1925	Previously held the Legislative Assembly of Queensland seat of Flinders. Served as Speaker during the Fisher and Hughes Governments. Died in office the day before the 1925 federal election
	Grosvenor Francis (1873–1944)	Nationalist	14 November 1925 – 12 October 1929	Lost seat
	Darby Riordan (1886–1936)	Labor	12 October 1929 – 15 October 1936	Previously held the Legislative Assembly of Queensland seat of Burke. Died in office. Nephew was Bill Riordan
	Bill Riordan (1908–1973)	Labor	12 December 1936 – 31 October 1966	Served as minister under Chifley. Retired. Uncle was Darby Riordan
	Bob Katter Sr. (1918–1990)	Country	26 November 1966 – 2 May 1975	Served as minister under McMahon. Retired. Son is Bob Katter Jr.
	Bob Katter Sr. (1918–1990)	National Country	2 May 1975 – 16 October 1982	Served as minister under McMahon. Retired. Son is Bob Katter Jr.
	Bob Katter Sr. (1918–1990)	Nationals	16 October 1982 – 19 February 1990	Served as minister under McMahon. Retired. Son is Bob Katter Jr.
	Rob Hulls (1957–)	Labor	24 March 1990 – 13 March 1993	Lost seat. Later elected to the Victorian Legislative Assembly seat of Niddrie in 1996
	Bob Katter Jr. (1945–)	Nationals	13 March 1993 – 9 July 2001	Previously held the Legislative Assembly of Queensland seat of Flinders. Incumbent. Father was Bob Katter Sr.
	Bob Katter Jr. (1945–)	Independent	9 July 2001 – 5 June 2011	Previously held the Legislative Assembly of Queensland seat of Flinders. Incumbent. Father was Bob Katter Sr.
	Bob Katter Jr. (1945–)	Katter's Australian	5 June 2011 – present	Previously held the Legislative Assembly of Queensland seat of Flinders. Incumbent. Father was Bob Katter Sr.

== Election results ==
2025 Australian federal election: Kennedy
Party	Candidate	Votes	%	±%
Katter's Australian	Bob Katter	39,219	40.36	−1.34
Liberal National	Annette Swaine	23,135	23.81	−4.38
Labor	Sharon Winn	15,917	16.38	+0.32
One Nation	Kate Harris	7,541	7.76	+7.76
Greens	Carole Stanford	5,761	5.93	−0.49
Trumpet of Patriots	Mark Westcott	2,283	2.35	+2.35
Family First	Douglas Lush	1,681	1.73	+1.73
Independent	Steven Clare	1,625	1.67	+1.67
Total formal votes		97,162	93.77	−2.95
Informal votes		6,460	6.23	+2.95
Turnout		103,622	83.77	−0.82
Notional two-party-preferred count
Liberal National	Annette Swaine	57,641	59.32	−0.84
Labor	Sharon Winn	39,521	40.68	+0.84
Two-candidate-preferred result
Katter's Australian	Bob Katter	63,888	65.75	+2.65
Liberal National	Annette Swaine	33,274	34.25	−2.65
Katter's Australian hold		Swing	+2.65	
