= Darby Riordan =

Australian politician

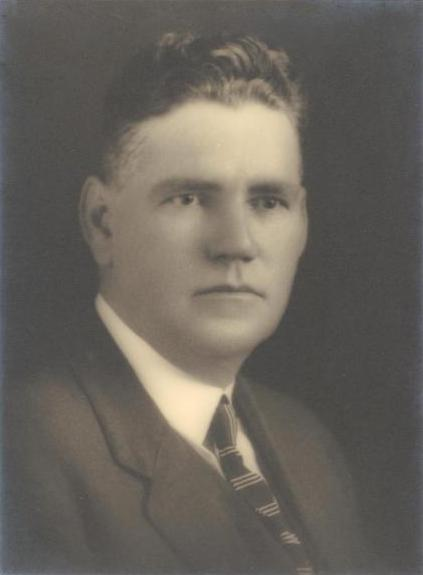

Member of the Australian Parliament for Kennedy
- In office 12 October 1929 – 15 October 1936
- Preceded by: Grosvenor Francis
- Succeeded by: Bill Riordan

Member of the Queensland Legislative Assembly for Burke
- In office 16 March 1918 – 16 September 1929
- Preceded by: William Murphy
- Succeeded by: Arthur Jones

Personal details
- Born: David Riordan; 23 July 1886 Mackay, Queensland, Australia
- Died: 15 October 1936 (aged 50) Brisbane, Australia
- Resting place: Lutwyche Cemetery
- Party: Australian Labor Party
- Spouse: Gertrude Anne Purcell (m.1913 d.1969)
- Relations: Bill Riordan (nephew); Jim Riordan (brother); Ernest Riordan (brother)

David "Darby" Riordan (23 July 1886 – 15 October 1936) was an Australian politician.

Riordan was the Australian Labor Party member for Burke in the Queensland Legislative Assembly, winning the seat in 1918. He held Burke till 1929 at which time he resigned from the seat to successfully contest the House of Representatives seat of Kennedy at the 1929 federal election.

Riordan won Kennedy from the sitting Nationalist Party member, Grosvenor Francis. He held the seat, improving his vote at each election, till his death in 1936 and succeeded by his nephew Bill.

Darcy Riordan had two brothers who were also politicians: Jim Riordan (a member of the Queensland Legislative Council from 1917 to 1922) and Ernest Riordan (a member of the Legislative Assembly of Queensland from 1936 to 1944 and 1950 to 1954).

Riordan died of pneumonia on 15 October 1936 at the Mater Misericordiae Hospital, Brisbane. He had undergone an operation to remove gallstones a few weeks earlier that left him in poor health. His funeral was held at St Stephan's Cathedral, and proceeded to the Lutwyche Cemetery.

Parliament of Australia
Preceded by Grosvenor Francis	Member for Kennedy; 1929–1936	Succeeded by Bill Riordan
Parliament of Queensland
Preceded by William Murphy	Member for Burke; 1918–1929	Succeeded by Arthur Jones
