= Rob Hulls =

Australian politician

The Honourable Rob Hulls AM
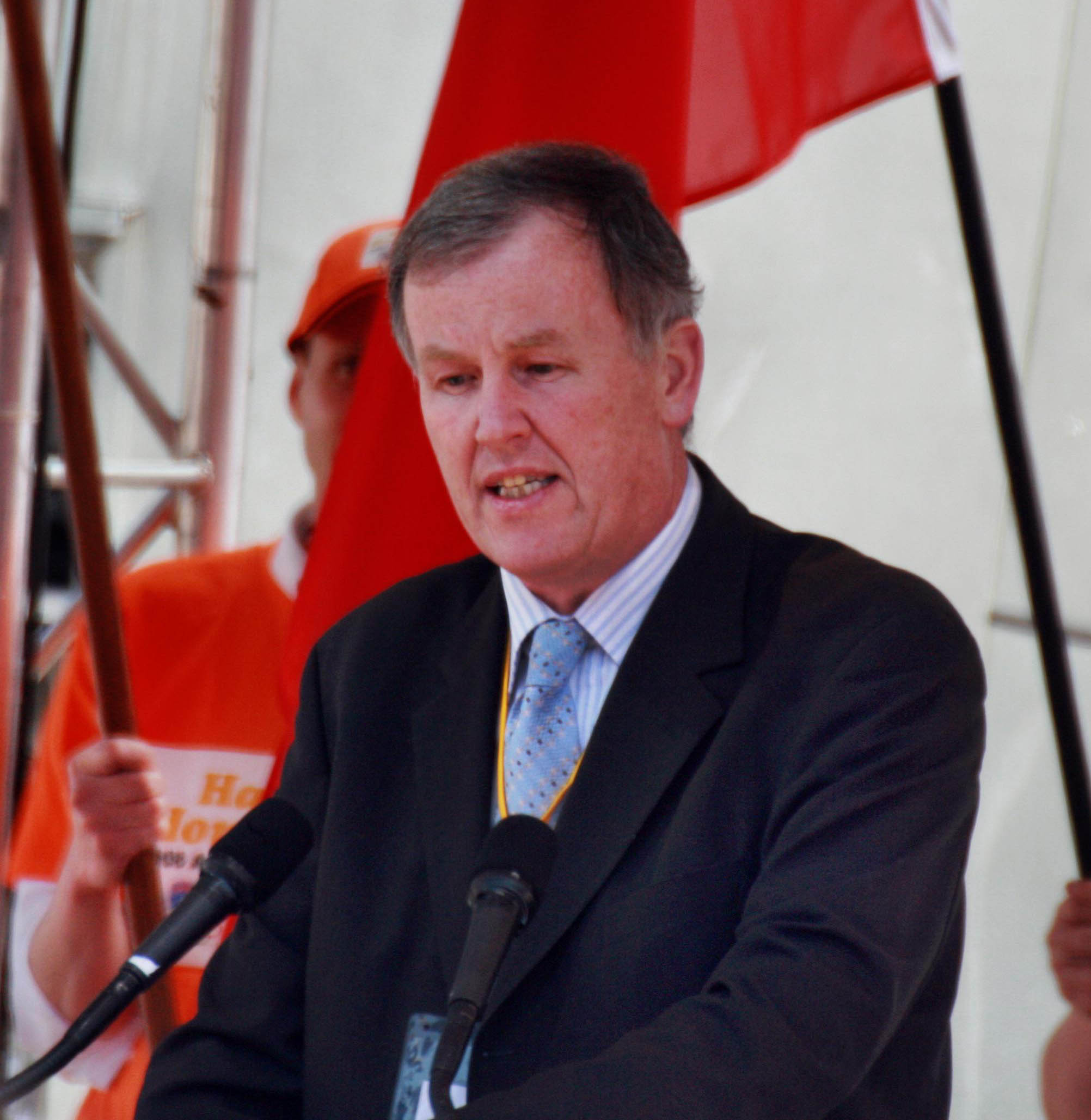
- Hulls in 2008

26th Deputy Premier of Victoria
- In office 30 July 2007 – 2 December 2010
- Premier: John Brumby
- Preceded by: John Thwaites
- Succeeded by: Peter Ryan

Deputy Leader of the Labor Party in Victoria
- In office 30 July 2007 – 2 February 2012
- Leader: John Brumby; Daniel Andrews
- Preceded by: John Thwaites
- Succeeded by: James Merlino

Attorney-General of Victoria
- In office 20 October 1999 – 2 December 2010
- Premier: Steve Bracks; John Brumby
- Preceded by: Jan Wade
- Succeeded by: Robert Clark

Minister for Racing
- In office 1 December 2006 – 2 December 2010
- Premier: Steve Bracks; John Brumby
- Preceded by: John Pandazopoulos
- Succeeded by: Denis Napthine
- In office 20 October 1999 – 5 December 2002
- Premier: Steve Bracks
- Preceded by: New position
- Succeeded by: John Pandazopoulos

Minister for Industrial Relations
- In office 5 December 2002 – 28 December 2008
- Premier: Steve Bracks; John Brumby
- Preceded by: John Lenders
- Succeeded by: Martin Pakula

Minister for Planning
- In office 25 January 2005 – 1 December 2006
- Premier: Steve Bracks
- Preceded by: Mary Delahunty
- Succeeded by: Justin Madden

Minister for WorkCover
- In office 5 December 2002 – 25 January 2005
- Premier: Steve Bracks
- Preceded by: Bob Cameron
- Succeeded by: Justin Madden

Minister for Manufacturing Industry
- In office 20 October 1999 – 5 December 2002
- Premier: Steve Bracks
- Preceded by: New position
- Succeeded by: Position abolished

Member of the Victorian Legislative Assembly for Niddrie
- In office 30 March 1996 – 27 January 2012
- Preceded by: Bob Sercombe
- Succeeded by: Ben Carroll

Member of the Australian Parliament for Kennedy
- In office 24 March 1990 – 13 March 1993
- Preceded by: Bob Katter Sr.
- Succeeded by: Bob Katter

Personal details
- Born: 23 January 1957 (age 69) Melbourne, Victoria, Australia
- Party: Labor Party
- Spouse(s): Petrina Dorrington (div. before 2001); Carolyn Burnside (m. 2002)
- Children: 4
- Education: RMIT University
- Profession: Solicitor

Rob Justin Hulls AM (born 23 January 1957) is a former Australian politician who was a member of the Victorian Legislative Assembly from 1996 to 2012, representing the electorate of Niddrie. As well as serving as the Deputy Premier of Victoria, he held the posts of state attorney-general and Minister for Racing.

During his tenure as Attorney-General of Victoria, Hulls was credited for revolutionising Victoria's justice system, with his reform agenda reshaping the state's criminal justice system into one widely recognised as the nation's most progressive.

== Biography ==
Rob Hulls was born in Melbourne as one of seven children. He was privately educated at Xavier College from 1969 to 1972 and then moved to the private Peninsula School from 1973 to 1975. Upon leaving school Hulls worked as a law clerk for his father, Francis Charles Hulls, who owned the firm Frank C. Hulls & Co, in La Trobe Street, Melbourne. He completed the Articled Clerk's Course at the Royal Melbourne Institute of Technology in 1982, was Admitted as Barrister and Solicitor of the Supreme Court of Victoria on 1 March 1983 and was admitted as Solicitor at the Supreme Court of Queensland in 1986.

Hulls served as a Solicitor for the Legal Aid Commission of Victoria from 1984 to 1986, and then worked for the West Queensland Aboriginal Legal Service for 5 years, and served as the Principal of Rob Hulls & Associates in Mt Isa from 1986 to 1990.

In addition to his legal career, prior to entering the Australian federal parliament, Hulls had served as a bar attendant, a grapepicker and as a labourer.

Hulls was appointed a Member of the Order of Australia for "significant service to the people and Parliament of Victoria, and to the law" in the 2021 Queen's Birthday Honours.

== Political career ==
=== Time in Queensland and federal parliament ===
Rob Hulls first joined the Labor Party after being recruited by Tony McGrady, a Mount Isa politician. Hulls was elected as an alderman to the Mount Isa City Council in 1987. In 1990, Hulls stood as the Labor candidate for the Division of Kennedy at that year's federal election. National MP Bob Katter Sr. had represented Kennedy for 24 years, and was thought of by McGrady to be difficult to beat. However, Katter would unexpectedly retire due to illness, with the National Party preselecting Ross Shannon as his replacement. Additionally, the unpopularity of the Cain government in Victoria meant that Labor would likely lose federal seats in the state. As a result, prime minister Bob Hawke visited a number of electorates that would have otherwise been longshots for Labor, hoping to win enough seats to retain government. Hawke would visit Longreach on 9 March, two weeks from the election, promising local road upgrades and government grants for the seat of Kennedy. Finally, on election day, floods rendered the eastern portion of the Kennedy electorate inaccessible, meaning voting had to be delayed. When the election was held in flood affected areas, it was already clear that Labor had defeated the Liberal–National Coalition, and so McGrady organised for flyers to be distributed, asking voters in eastern Kennedy whether they would prefer a government or opposition MP. Hulls would ultimately defeat Shannon, succeeding Katter Sr. and becoming the next MP for Kennedy.

As an MP, Hulls hired Kim McGrath, a pro bono lawyer for the Aboriginal Legal Service, to work as his electorate officer, the two having first met in Mount Isa. Hulls was factionally unaligned within Labor during his time in federal parliament. According to Mike Seccombe in The Sydney Morning Herald, Hulls was regarded as the best of the 1990 freshman MPs by "wise heads in Labor". Seccombe noted achievements of Hulls such as retaining protections for the sugar industry and advocating for proceedings to be brought against Colonial Mutual for allegedly misleading Aboriginal customers on insurance policies.

However, at the 1993 federal election, Hulls faced Bob Katter Jr., the son of Katter Sr., as his opponent in Kennedy. The younger Katter had served in the Bjelke-Petersen ministry, and was described by Seccombe as a populist campaigner with far-right views. Despite leading on first preferences, Hulls would be defeated by Katter Jr. after the preferences of the Liberal candidate, Dave Cashmore, were distributed on the eighth count.

=== Parliament of Victoria ===
Rob Hulls left Queensland soon after the losing his Federal Parliament seat, and in 1994 on returning to Melbourne was appointed Chief of Staff to the Victorian Opposition Leader, Jim Kennan, former attorney-general, who resigned from State Parliament shortly afterwards. Rob Hulls stayed on as Chief of Staff under Kennan's replacement John Brumby, who was Premier from 2007 to 2010. Following his election to the State Parliament, in the lower-house seat of Niddrie, Rob Hulls' replacement as Brumby's Chief of Staff was Julia Gillard, who later in her own career became Australia's first female prime minister (2010–13).

During his time in opposition, Hulls served as Shadow Minister Assisting the Leader on Scrutiny of Government (4 April 1996 – 13 January 1997), Shadow Attorney-General (4 April 1996 – 20 October 1999), Shadow Minister for Gaming (4 April 1996 – 1 October 1999), Shadow Minister for Tourism (13 January 1997 – 24 February 1999), Shadow Minister for WorkCover (24 February 1999 – 1 October 1999), Shadow Minister for Manufacturing Industry (1 October 1999 – 20 October 1999) and Shadow Minister for Racing (1 October 1999 – 20 October 1999). Throughout his state political career, Hulls held the offices of Attorney-General of Victoria; Minister for Manufacturing Industry and Minister for Racing from 1999 to 2002; Minister for WorkCover from 2002 to 2005; Minister for Planning from January 2005 to December 2006; Minister for Racing from December 2006 to November 2010 and Minister for Industrial Relations from December 2002 to November 2010.

As attorney-general, Rob Hulls instigated significant and lasting changes to Victoria's legal system which saw Victoria become a national leader in progressive social justice reform, such as removing barriers to accessing assisted reproductive technology and abolishing laws that discriminated against people in same-sex relationships; many of Hulls' reforms have become an accepted and valued part of the state's mainstream justice and social welfare systems and have influenced other jurisdictions to follow suit. Hulls oversaw the establishment of the state's first Charter of Human Rights and reform to Victoria's Upper House. He established special courts for Victoria's indigenous community, for people with mental health issues (Assessment and Referral Court), for people with drug addiction (Drug Court) and for victims of family violence (Family Violence specialist list), as well as creating Australia's first and only Neighbourhood Justice Centre. Additionally, he introduced an open tender process for applicants to Victoria's judiciary to ensure that more women and people from diverse backgrounds were appointed. He appointed Australia's first female chief justice of any superior court by appointing Marilyn Warren as Chief Justice of Victoria in 2003, as well as appointing a significant number of women to both the Magistrates Court and the County Court.

In May 2008, Hulls sought and obtained the first posthumous pardon in Victoria's legal history and the only instance of a pardon for a judicially executed person in Australia to date, when he sought and obtained a pardon for Colin Campbell Ross, who was found to have been wrongfully executed for the murder of a young girl in 1922.

He was unsuccessful in a campaign to defrock the legal profession and ban the wearing of wigs in courts, a move that was actively opposed by the Victorian Bar Association. Rob Hulls was quoted as saying that "members of the legal profession could continue to wear wigs in the privacy of their homes if they so wished but the wearing of wigs by the legal profession in the 21st century was outdated and elitist".

He was appointed as deputy premier to John Brumby on 30 July 2007 after the retirement of John Thwaites, and retained the position as attorney-general until his party's defeat at the election on 27 November 2010. He subsequently served as Deputy Opposition Leader and as Labor's education spokesman.

In 2011, Hulls suffered from the life-threatening condition epiglottitis which caused his airway to block; this led to him being placed in an induced coma for five days. On 27 January 2012, Hulls announced he was resigning from parliament. This triggered a by-election in the seat of Niddrie.

== Personal life ==
A very keen supporter of the Geelong Football Club, Hulls married twice and has four children.

In October 2012, Hulls was appointed adjunct professor at RMIT and was invited to establish the new Centre for Innovative Justice as its inaugural director. The centre's objective is to develop, drive, and expand the capacity of the justice system.

Parliament of Australia
Preceded by Bob Katter, Sr.	Member for Kennedy; 1990–1993	Succeeded by Bob Katter, Jr.
Victorian Legislative Assembly
Preceded by Bob Sercombe	Member for Niddrie; 1996–2012	Succeeded by Ben Carroll
Political offices
Preceded by Jan Wade	Attorney-General of Victoria; 1999–2010	Succeeded by Robert Clark
Preceded by John Thwaites	Deputy Premier of Victoria; 2007–2010	Succeeded by Peter Ryan
Party political offices
Preceded by John Thwaites	Deputy Leader of the Labor Party in Victoria; 2007–2012	Succeeded by James Merlino
