= Columba Catholic College =

Coordinates: 20°04′28.84″S 146°15′44.42″E

- Charters Towers City, Charters Towers, Queensland; Australia

Information
- Type: Independent co-educational primary and secondary day and boarding school
- Motto: Light to the World
- Religious affiliation: Diocese of Townsville
- Denomination: Roman Catholic
- Established: 1998; 28 years ago
- Principal: Candi Dempster
- Enrolment: 610 (P–12)
- Colours: Blue, red and gold
- Website: www.columba.qld.edu.au

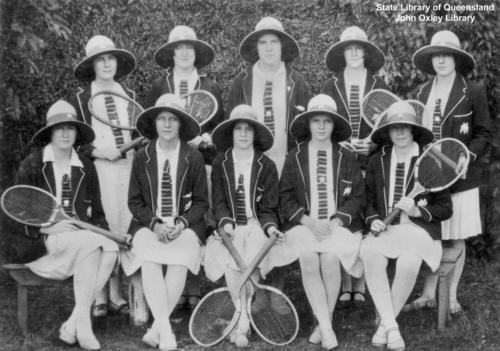
St Mary's College tennis team, ca. 1905

Columba Catholic College is an independent Roman Catholic co-educational primary and secondary day and boarding school, located in Charters Towers, Queensland, Australia. It is a school of the Diocese of Townsville.

Established in 1998, the school currently caters for approximately 610 students from pre-school to year 12, including 200 boarders from year 4 to 12. The college draws students from Charters Towers and surrounding areas. Boarders come from the Northern Territory and Northern Western Australia, plus coastal and Gulf Regions of Queensland.

The current principal of Columba Catholic College is Candi Dempster. Dempster takes over from Daniel McShea who took over from Michael Ashton. Althea Norton was the original founding principal of Columba who retired after 10 years of service.

== History ==
Columba Catholic College was established in 1998 through the amalgamation of three local Catholic schools, St Columba's Primary School (established in 1876), St Mary's College (established in 1882) and Mount Carmel College (established by the Congregation of Christian Brothers in 1902).

== Campus ==
Columba Catholic College consists of two campuses, known as St Mary's for primary school in Charters Towers City and Mt Carmel for secondary school in Richmond Hill. The boarding program operates from the two campuses in order to provide single-sex facilities, the St Mary's campus caters for girls and the Mt Carmel Campus for boys. The Christian Brothers retain ownership of the Mt Carmal campus (the former site of Mt Carmal College) and continue to provide some Brothers to the staff.

Each of the Boarding Campuses has its own Chapel, while the Primary Campus is situated in the grounds of the Parish Church.

The school also operates "Marybank" a 40-hectare property with facilities for outdoor activities, situated on the banks of the Burdekin River. Sporting facilities of the college include several ovals, basketball, tennis and netball courts, two 25 m swimming pools (one at each campus), and the recently constructed Multi-Purpose Outdoor Education Centre.

== Curriculum ==
=== Primary ===
The Primary Curriculum at Columba Catholic College is designed to emphasise the basic skills of numeracy and literacy, whilst integrating the Key Learning Areas (KLA's) of Religious Education, English, Maths, Science, Studies of Society and Environment, Languages other than English (LOTE), Health and Physical Education, The Arts and Technology.

=== Secondary ===
In Queensland, the first year of high school is year 7. During this year students continue with Key Learning Areas subjects in addition to experiencing new subjects. These include Religious Education, English, Mathematics, Science, Art, Study of Society and the Environment, Home Economics, Wood Technology, Metal Technology, Music, Computer Technology, Graphics, Health & Physical Education, and Drama.

In years 9 and 10 students receive some choice in the subjects they will study. There are also core subjects which all students must undertake for the complete school year. These are Religious Education, English, Mathematics, Science, Study of Society and the Environment (S.O.S.E), Health and Physical Education. Electives at this stage include Japanese, Agricultural Science, Home Economics, Computer Technology, Business Studies, Drama, Wood Technology, Junior Visual Art, Metal Technology, Music and Graphics.

Students in years 11 and 12 are prepared for the path they wish to take after high school (university, TAFE or employment). Those deciding to leave open the option of direct entry to University or TAFE (Diploma Courses) after Year 12 are required to choose a minimum of five "Authority Subjects" (B). These subjects come under the headings of Authority (A), Authority Registered (AR), Subject Area Specifications (S), or are purely TAFE Based (T). Additionally, each Year 11 and 12 student is required to study Religious Education (T), one English subject, and one Mathematics Subject.

Columba Catholic College performs well in statewide examinations, with The Courier-Mail reporting that the college was one of Queensland's top-performing schools with 89 per cent of students on Overall Position scores (OP's) 15 or above.

== See also ==
- List of schools in Queensland
- List of boarding schools in Australia
- Catholic education in Australia
