= Electoral district of Niddrie =

State electoral district of Victoria, Australia

Niddrie Victoria—Legislative Assembly
- Interactive map of electoral district boundaries from the 2022 state election
- State: Victoria
- Created: 1976
- MP: Ben Carroll
- Party: Labor Party
- Namesake: Niddrie
- Electors: 44,716 (2018)
- Area: 39 km^{2} (15.1 sq mi)
- Demographic: Metropolitan

The electoral district of Niddrie is a metropolitan electorate approximately 8 kilometres (5 mi) northwest of Melbourne, Australia in Victoria's Legislative Assembly.

The Niddrie District covers an area of 39 square kilometres (15 sq mi), including the suburbs of Aberfeldie, Airport West, Avondale Heights, Essendon West, Keilor, Keilor East, Keilor Park and Niddrie and parts of the suburbs of Essendon and Taylors Lakes.

The district boundaries include Sharps Road for part of the north, Tullamarine Freeway and Roberts Street for parts of the east, Maribyrnong River in the south, and Sunshine Avenue for part of the west.

It is part of the Upper House Western Metropolitan Region.

== Members for Niddrie ==
| Member | Party | Term |
|---|---|---|
| Jack Simpson | Labor | 1976–1988 |
| Bob Sercombe | Labor | 1988–1996 |
| Rob Hulls | Labor | 1996–2012 |
| Ben Carroll | Labor | 2012–present |

== Election results ==
2022 Victorian state election: Niddrie
| Party | Candidate | Votes | % | ±% |
|---|---|---|---|---|
| Labor | Ben Carroll | 18,567 | 43.9 | −10.9 |
| Liberal | Alan Youhana | 14,344 | 34.0 | −0.3 |
| Greens | Declan McGinness | 3,117 | 7.4 | +0.5 |
| Freedom | Frank Maugeri | 1,899 | 4.5 | +4.5 |
| Democratic Labour | Holly Kruse | 1,172 | 2.8 | +2.8 |
| Family First | Joanne Garcia | 1,096 | 2.6 | +2.6 |
| Victorian Socialists | Brad Reich | 966 | 2.3 | +2.3 |
| Animal Justice | Shannon Meilak | 812 | 1.9 | −1.9 |
| New Democrats | Georgia Grammenos | 269 | 0.6 | +0.6 |
| Total formal votes | | 42,242 | 93.9 | –0.4 |
| Informal votes | | 2,763 | 6.1 | +0.4 |
| Turnout | | 45,005 | 90.0 | –0.1 |
Two-party-preferred result
| Labor | Ben Carroll | 23,949 | 56.7 | −5.8 |
| Liberal | Alan Youhana | 18,293 | 43.3 | +5.8 |
| Labor hold | | Swing | −5.8 | |
