= Electoral results for the district of Flinders (Queensland) =

Queensland, Australia, district election results

This is a list of electoral results for the Flinders in Queensland state elections.

== Members for Flinders ==
Member	Party	Term
First incarnation (1888–1932)
Louis Goldring		1888–1893
Charles McDonald	Labour	1893–1901
Peter Airey	Labour	1901–1907
John May	Labor	1907–1917
John Mullan	Labor	1918–1932
Second incarnation (1950–1992)
Ernest Riordan	Labor	1950–1954
Frank Forde	Labor	1955–1957
Bill Longeran	Country	1957–1974
Bob Katter	National	1974–1992

== Election results ==
=== Elections in the 1980s ===
1989 Queensland state election: Flinders
Party	Candidate	Votes	%	±%
Labor	Noel Robertson	4,316	45.2	+6.0
National	Bob Katter	4,315	45.2	−15.6
Independent	Beryl Hunter	408	4.3	+4.3
Liberal	Owen Pershouse	345	3.6	+3.6
Independent	Harrison Duncan	165	1.7	+1.7
Total formal votes		9,549	96.2	−1.1
Informal votes		381	3.8	+1.1
Turnout		9,930	89.6	−0.4
Two-party-preferred result
National	Bob Katter	4,976	52.1	−8.7
Labor	Noel Robertson	4,573	47.9	+8.7
National hold		Swing	−8.7	

1986 Queensland state election: Flinders
Party	Candidate	Votes	%	±%
National	Bob Katter	5,484	60.8	+9.0
Labor	Alex Wilson	3,529	39.2	−2.2
Total formal votes		9,013	97.3	
Informal votes		246	2.7	
Turnout		9,259	90.0	
National hold		Swing	+2.9	

1983 Queensland state election: Flinders
Party	Candidate	Votes	%	±%
National	Bob Katter	5,124	51.8	−4.2
Labor	Beverley Lauder	4,090	41.4	−2.6
Independent	Peter Black	671	6.8	+6.8
Total formal votes		9,885	98.9	+0.1
Informal votes		109	1.1	−0.1
Turnout		9,994	90.0	+3.8
Two-party-preferred result
National	Bob Katter	5,460	55.2	−0.8
Labor	Beverley Lauder	4,425	44.8	+0.8
National hold		Swing	−0.8	

1980 Queensland state election: Flinders
Party	Candidate	Votes	%	±%
National	Bob Katter	4,993	56.0	+1.8
Labor	Thomas Greenwood	3,927	44.0	+2.4
Total formal votes		8,920	98.8	−0.1
Informal votes		106	1.2	+0.1
Turnout		9,026	86.2	−3.9
National hold		Swing	−1.1	

=== Elections in the 1970s ===
1977 Queensland state election: Flinders
Party	Candidate	Votes	%	±%
National	Bob Katter	4,838	54.2	+6.3
Labor	Edward Schunemann	3,715	41.6	+8.3
Progress	Owen Pershouse	379	4.2	+4.2
Total formal votes		8,932	98.9	
Informal votes		95	1.1	
Turnout		9,027	90.1	
Two-party-preferred result
National	Bob Katter	5,103	57.1	−2.3
Labor	Edward Schunemann	3,829	42.9	+2.3
National hold		Swing	−2.3	

1974 Queensland state election: Flinders
Party	Candidate	Votes	%	±%
National	Bob Katter	3,592	47.9	−11.8
Labor	Albert Sorohan	2,497	33.3	−7.0
Liberal	James McGucken	1,412	18.8	+18.8
Total formal votes		7,501	99.4	+0.5
Informal votes		47	0.6	−0.5
Turnout		7,548	88.8	+1.5
Two-party-preferred result
National	Bob Katter	4,789	63.8	+4.1
Labor	Albert Sorohan	2,712	36.2	−4.1
National hold		Swing	+4.1	

1972 Queensland state election: Flinders
Party	Candidate	Votes	%	±%
Country	Bill Longeran	4,010	59.7	+5.1
Labor	Peter Lindenmayer	2,703	40.3	−5.1
Total formal votes		6,713	98.9	
Informal votes		74	1.1	
Turnout		6,787	87.3	
Country hold		Swing	+5.1	

=== Elections in the 1960s ===
1969 Queensland state election: Flinders
Party	Candidate	Votes	%	±%
Country	Bill Longeran	3,885	55.1	−6.3
Labor	Douglas Lloyd	3,170	44.9	+10.4
Total formal votes		7,055	99.2	+0.8
Informal votes		57	0.8	−0.8
Turnout		7,112	89.4	−1.2
Country hold		Swing	−9.4	

1966 Queensland state election: Flinders
Party	Candidate	Votes	%	±%
Country	Bill Longeran	4,483	61.4	+6.0
Labor	Peter McKitrick	2,516	34.5	−6.3
Queensland Labor	John Judge	223	3.1	−0.7
Independent	Charles Rowe	73	1.0	+1.0
Total formal votes		7,295	98.4	−0.3
Informal votes		119	1.6	+0.3
Turnout		7,414	90.6	−1.0
Two-party-preferred result
Country	Bill Longeran	4,708	64.5	+5.9
Labor	Peter McKitrick	2,587	35.5	−5.9
Country hold		Swing	+5.9	

1963 Queensland state election: Flinders
Party	Candidate	Votes	%	±%
Country	Bill Longeran	4,273	55.4	+7.5
Labor	Charles Rattray	3,147	40.8	−5.8
Queensland Labor	John Judge	290	3.8	−1.7
Total formal votes		7,710	98.7	−0.4
Informal votes		99	1.3	+0.4
Turnout		7,809	91.6	−1.4
Two-party-preferred result
Country	Bill Longeran	4,517	58.6	
Labor	Charles Rattray	3,193	41.4	
Country hold		Swing	N/A	

1960 Queensland state election: Flinders
Party	Candidate	Votes	%	±%
Country	Bill Longeran	3,831	47.9	
Labor	Frank Forde	3,721	46.6	
Queensland Labor	Patrick McLaughlin	437	5.5	
Total formal votes		7,989	99.1	
Informal votes		75	0.9	
Turnout		8,064	90.2	
Country hold		Swing		

=== Elections in the 1950s ===
1958 Flinders state by-election
Party	Candidate	Votes	%	±%
Country	Bill Longeran	1,948	45.7	+11.3
Labor	Frank Forde	1,534	36.0	+1.6
Queensland Labor	Bob Katter	780	18.3	−7.5
Total formal votes		4,262	99.7	+0.5
Informal votes		11	0.3	−0.5
Turnout		4,273	82.0	−5.1
Country hold		Swing	N/A	

1957 Queensland state election: Flinders
Party	Candidate	Votes	%	±%
Country	Bill Longeran	1,441	34.4	−7.5
Labor	Frank Forde	1,440	34.4	−23.7
Queensland Labor	Bob Katter	1,079	25.8	+25.8
Independent	Charles Corney	225	5.4	+5.4
Total formal votes		4,185	99.2	−0.1
Informal votes		33	0.8	+0.1
Turnout		4,218	87.1	+4.0
Country gain from Labor		Swing	+8.1	

1956 Queensland state election: Flinders
Party	Candidate	Votes	%	±%
Labor	Frank Forde	2,269	58.1	−41.9
Country	Bill Longeran	1,638	41.9	+41.9
Total formal votes		3,907	99.3	
Informal votes		27	0.7	
Turnout		3,934	83.1	
Labor hold		Swing	N/A	

1955 Flinders state by-election
Party	Candidate	Votes	%	±%
Labor	Frank Forde	1,176	46.0	−54.0
Country	Bill Longeran	864	33.8	+33.8
Independent Labor	Charles Corney	519	20.3	+20.3
Total formal votes		2,559	98.9	
Informal votes		28	1.1	
Turnout		2,587	57.6	
Labor hold		Swing	N/A	

1953 Queensland state election: Flinders
Party	Candidate	Votes	%	±%
Labor	Ernest Riordan	unopposed		
Labor hold		Swing		

1950 Queensland state election: Flinders
Party	Candidate	Votes	%	±%
Labor	Ernest Riordan	1,907	47.5	
Country	Gordon Stuart	1,610	40.1	
NQ Labor	Victor Casey	291	7.3	
Independent	William Hall	207	5.1	
Total formal votes		4,015	98.6	
Informal votes		58	1.4	
Turnout		4,073	84.5	
Labor hold		Swing		

=== Elections in the 1920s ===
1929 Queensland state election: Flinders
Party	Candidate	Votes	%	±%
Labor	John Mullan	1,693	66.2	+0.3
CPNP	James Scholefield	863	33.8	−0.3
Total formal votes		2,556	98.7	−0.6
Informal votes		34	1.3	+0.6
Turnout		2,590		
Labor hold		Swing	+0.3	

1926 Queensland state election: Flinders
Party	Candidate	Votes	%	±%
Labor	John Mullan	1,342	65.9	+3.0
CPNP	Neville Sturzaker	695	34.1	−3.0
Total formal votes		2,037	99.3	+0.1
Informal votes		15	0.7	−0.1
Turnout		2,052	74.9	+26.3
Labor hold		Swing	+3.0	

1923 Queensland state election: Flinders
Party	Candidate	Votes	%	±%
Labor	John Mullan	1,193	62.9	−1.6
United	Leonard Nicolson	703	37.1	+37.1
Total formal votes		1,896	99.2	+0.3
Informal votes		16	0.8	−0.3
Turnout		1,912	48.6	−1.0
Labor hold		Swing	N/A	

1920 Queensland state election: Flinders
Party	Candidate	Votes	%	±%
Labor	John Mullan	2,590	64.5	−11.2
Northern Country	Eric Huntley	1,423	35.5	+35.5
Total formal votes		4,013	98.9	+0.7
Informal votes		46	1.1	−0.7
Turnout		4,059	49.6	−9.5
Labor hold		Swing	−11.2	

=== Elections in the 1910s ===
1918 Queensland state election: Flinders
Party	Candidate	Votes	%	±%
Labor	John Mullan	3,171	75.7	−24.3
National	William Little	1,019	24.3	+24.3
Total formal votes		4,190	98.2	
Informal votes		78	1.8	
Turnout		4,268	59.1	
Labor hold		Swing	N/A	

1915 Queensland state election: Flinders
Party	Candidate	Votes	%	±%
Labor	John May	unopposed		
Labor hold		Swing		

1912 Queensland state election: Flinders
Party	Candidate	Votes	%	±%
Labor	John May	unopposed		
Labor hold		Swing		
