= Karyn Dwyer =

Canadian actress

- Born: Karyn Elizabeth Dwyer; 22 March 1975; Corner Brook, Newfoundland, Canada
- Died: 25 September 2018 (aged 43); Toronto, Ontario, Canada
- Occupation: Actress
- Years active: 1993–2018

Karyn Elizabeth Dwyer (22 March 1975 – 25 September 2018) was a Canadian actress, whose best known role was as Maggie in the 1999 film Better Than Chocolate.

== Early life ==
Dwyer was the oldest of five children, three sons and two daughters, born into an Irish Catholic family in Corner Brook, Newfoundland, Canada, on 22 March 1975. Her father died at the age of 38. Her brother died at the age of 24. All her brothers were named after the Boston Bruins: Brad (Park), Barry (Beck) and Paul (Hurley).

Dwyer studied acting with the Youth Theatre. She made her stage debut at the Arts and Culture Center at the age of 10, playing the title role in Theatre Newfoundland and Labrador's production of Alice in Wonderland and went on to become an accomplished child stage actress performing in various theatres throughout Newfoundland and Labrador. She also performed in her school productions, won awards for acting, public speaking, singing and instrumental performance and wrote for the school newspaper. She moved to Toronto, Ontario, to attend the George Brown Theatre School. Dwyer attended theatre school for one year and then began studying with David Rotenberg's on-camera acting class also in Toronto and later John Riven's Meisner.

== Career ==
After moving to Toronto, Dwyer landed her first film role acting opposite David Cronenberg in the independent Canadian film Boozecan. She wrote and starred in her one-woman show Bad Girls at the Rivoli in Toronto. In 1994 she played Phoebe in As You Like It opposite Seana McKenna and Albert Schultz in the Du Maurier World Stage Theatre Festival.

In 1999 Dwyer starred as the 19-year-old Maggie in the lesbian-themed film Better Than Chocolate, winning the role over hundreds of others who auditioned in a cross Canada search. The film won numerous audience choice awards at film festivals all around the world, was ranked 31st on The Hollywood Reporter's Top 200 independent films list of 1999. It had one of Canada's highest international box office grosses and earned Dwyer a loyal cult following. Better Than Chocolate opened to rave reviews at both the Berlin Film Festival and the Vancouver International Film Festival. It was hailed by "Variety" as a terrifically entertaining romantic comedy. "The Hollywood Reporter" called Dwyer the film's heart and soul. Better Than Chocolate ranked 31 on "The Hollywood Reporter"'s list of best independent films. The "Chicago Tribune" review declared that the, "highlight of the movie is unquestionably Dwyer's performance as Maggie."

Also that year, Dwyer played Summer Falls in the bigger budget studio film Superstar, with Molly Shannon and Will Ferrell and produced by Lorne Michaels. Dwyer returned to the stage playing the title role in Native Earth's Romeo and Juliet, performance artist Sooze in Eric Bogosian's Suburbia and originated the role of Carrie, a junkie prostitute in the experimental play Exercises in Depravity, which featured R. H. Thomson.

She also starred in award-winning short films adapted from plays: Pony, adapted from White Biting Dog by playwright Judith Thompson; Dying Like Ophelia, adapted from Lion in the Streets also by playwright Judith Thompson; Polished, adapted from Polished by playwright James Harkness. In 2005, Dwyer reunited with her Better Than Chocolate director Anne Wheeler, guest starring in the awarding winning Canadian series This Is Wonderland. True to her roots, Dwyer returned to Newfoundland and Labrador, where she studied filmmaking at NIFCO, guest starred on Republic of Doyle, and shared her talent at For the Love of Learning, Inc, a not-for-profit empowerment and creativity-based learning program, teaching theatre to Newfoundland and Labrador's youth to use their creativity to overcome social and / or economic obstacles. In 2006, Dwyer was voted one of the Top Ten Hottest Actresses and profiled as The Hottest Canadian on "The Hottest Canadian". She was also named a Newfoundland Entertainment Icon by "The Newfoundland Herald".

== Death ==
Dwyer died on 25 September 2018 at the age of 43 from suicide.

== Filmography ==
=== Film ===
Year	Title	Role	Notes
1994	Boozecan	Rosy	
1994	The Paperboy	Brenda	
1996	Lethal Tender	Sparky	
1998	Tian shang ren jian	Jenny	
1999	Better Than Chocolate	Maggie	
1999	Superstar	Summer Falls	
2000	The List	Kathy Miller	
2001	An Intrigue of Manners	Lady Emelia	
2001	Dead by Monday	Christine	
2002	Polished	Jo	Short
2002	Dying Like Ophelia	Joanne 'Ophelia'	Short
2004	The Right Way	Amy	
2007	Last Call Before Sunset	Morgan	Video
2012	Monster Mountain	Carrie	Video
2013	The Art of the Steal	Ginger	
2014	A Trip to the Island	Woman	
2015	Burning, Burning	The Woman	
2017	Goodbye, Hello	Woman	Short

=== Television ===
Year	Title	Role	Notes
1993	J.F.K.: Reckless Youth	Sadie	TV miniseries
1993	Family Pictures	Stephanie	TV film
1993	Class of '96	Julia	"David Is Authorized", "See You in September"
1993	The Hidden Room	Rhoda	"Transfigured Night"
1994	Kung Fu: The Legend Continues	Ginger Dawson	"May I Ride with You"
1995	A Taste of Shakespeare	Ophelia / Horatio	"Hamlet"
1995	End of Summer	Jenny Malone	TV film
1995	Due South	Mary Ann	"Heaven and Earth"
1996	Due South	Tiffany	"Some Like It Red"
1996	Road to Avonlea	Laura	"Woman of Importance"
1996	Double Jeopardy	Melanie Marks	TV film
1996	A Husband, a Wife and a Lover	Samantha	TV film
1998	Psi Factor	Karen Russell	"The Labyrinth"
1998	The Fixer	Irene	TV film
1998	Thanks of a Grateful Nation	Deeni	TV miniseries
2000	Cheaters	Angela Lam	TV film
2000	The Stalking of Laurie Show	Jennifer	TV film
2000	Sailor Moon	Besubesu (voice)	18 episodes
2002	Bliss	Mitzi	"The Footpath of Pink Roses"
2005	This Is Wonderland	Tammy	"2.7"
2010	Republic of Doyle	Brooke	"He Sleeps with the Chips"
2011	First World Problems	Karyn	TV series
2011	Rose Bud's Guide to Seduction	Rose Bud	"When to Jump a Feller's Bones", "Orgasm: Coming or Going"
2013	Shit Mainlanders Say to Newfoundlanders	Mainlander	TV series
