= 1955 Flinders state by-election =

1955 By-election in Queensland

- 12 March 1955
	First party	Second party	Third party
Candidate	Frank Forde	Bill Longeran	Charles Corney
Party	Labor	Country	Independent Labor
Popular vote	1,176	864	519
Percentage	46.0	33.8	20.3
Swing	—	—	—

The 1955 Flinders state by-election was a by-election held on 12 March 1955 for the Flinders seat in the Queensland Legislative Assembly. The by-election was triggered by the death of the sitting Labor member Ernest Riordan on 9 December 1954. The seat was won by former Prime Minister of Australia Frank Forde, making him the only former prime minister to subsequently serve in an Australian state parliament.

== Background ==
The electoral district of Flinders was a rural electorate in outback Queensland, encompassing the towns of Charters Towers, Hughenden and Julia Creek. The seat had been recreated in 1950 after having been abolished in a 1931 redistribution. It was named after Matthew Flinders.

Ernest Riordan won the seat for Labor at the 1950 state election. He was returned unopposed at the 1953 election. Riordan served as Secretary for Mines and Immigration from March 1952 under Premier Vince Gair. Riordan was granted six months' leave from Cabinet duties in November 1954 but died at his Ashgrove home less than a month later on 9 December 1954, aged 52. He was accorded a state funeral on 11 December 1954. creating a casual vacancy that resulted in the by-election.

== Candidates ==
Frank Forde, who had served as the 15th Prime Minister of Australia for eight days in July 1945 following the death of John Curtin, was endorsed as the Labor candidate. Forde had been the Deputy Leader of the Australian Labor Party from 1932 to 1946 and had served as Minister for the Army during the Second World War. Forde attempted to re-enter federal parliament as the Labor candidate for Wide Bay at the 1954 federal election, but was unsuccessful.

Bill Longeran was the Country Party candidate. Charles Corney ran as an Independent Labor candidate.

== Results ==
Forde won the by-election with 46.0 per cent of the primary vote. Longeran received 33.8 per cent and Corney 20.3 per cent.

Party	Candidate	Votes	%
Labor	Frank Forde	1,176	46.0
Country	Bill Longeran	864	33.8
Independent Labor	Charles Corney	519	20.3
Total formal votes		2,559	98.9
Informal votes		28	1.1
Turnout		2,587	57.6

== Aftermath ==
Forde held the seat of Flinders at the 1956 state election. However, his tenure was cut short by the Labor split in Queensland, during which Premier Vince Gair was expelled from the Labor Party in April 1957 and formed the breakaway Queensland Labor Party. At the 1957 state election Forde was defeated in Flinders by Country Party candidate Bill Longeran by a single vote.

Forde successfully appealed against the result on technical grounds, and the election was declared void on 4 March 1958.The resulting by-election Longeran defeated Forde by over 400 votes. It was reported that had Forde been returned, he might have become leader of the state Labor Party, which was suffering from a shortage of experienced members following the split.

Forde sought Labor preselection for Flinders once more in 1959 but was unsuccessful. He remains the only former prime minister to have served in an Australian state parliament after holding the office of prime minister.

== See also ==
- Electoral district of Flinders (Queensland)
- Electoral results for the district of Flinders (Queensland)
- Frank Forde
- Ernest Riordan
- 1957 Queensland state election
