= Lion in the Streets =

Lion in the Streets is a two-act play by award-winning Canadian playwright Judith Thompson, workshopped as the first Public Workshop Project at the Tarragon Theatre in Toronto, Canada in May 1990. It was then produced in its current form one month later at the duMaurier Theatre Centre, also in Toronto, as part of the duMaurier World Stage Theatre Festival. Music for the production was composed and performed by Bill Thompson.

Its central character is the ghost Isobel, a nine-year-old Portuguese girl who is searching for her killer by observing and occasionally interacting with her neighbors seventeen years after her murder, revealing their dark, horrific, emotional, and very private experiences.

Lion in the Streets was published in 1992 by Playwrights Canada Press.

== Characters ==
There are twenty-eight or twenty-nine characters with speaking parts of varying lengths. The original ensemble was composed of four women and two men who split the roles up roughly as follows (there is some confusion in the Playwrights Canada Press printing, as some character names in the initial list do not actually exist in the play, and some characters who do speak are omitted entirely):

Women:

- Isobel
- Nellie, Laura, Elaine, Christine, Sherry
- Rachel (who is also Rose for two pages), Lily, Rhonda, Ellen, Scarlett
- Sue, Jill, Joanne, Joan (an optional character)

Men:

- Scalato, Timmy, George, Maria, David, Rodney, (Edward?), Ben
- Martin, Bill, Isobel's Father, Ron, Father Hayes, Michael, (Edward?)

== Plot ==
Isobel's ghost wanders around lost, in a playground. "Is my house but is not my house is my street but is not my street my people is gone I am lost." (Thompson, Lion in the Streets, line 11–13) A woman named Sue comes to her rescue from other kids picking on her. Before Isobel follows Sue home she sees her father, and recalls that he is dead. After Sue's son Tommy makes some depressing comments, Isobel follows Sue on to a dinner party with her husband. Sue calls him to come home and finds out he's been having an affair with a woman at the party. Isobel realizes Sue's inability to care for her and calls the audience for someone to take her home.

Isobel stays with Laura, the dinner party hostess, and witnesses a flashback to when Isobel's mother, Maria, found out about Isobel's father's suicide. As Maria tells of her vision of her husband dying, Isobel dramatically acts out her father falling onto the train tracks. As Laura goes on to a daycare meeting, she gets into a heated conversation with Rhonda, the childcare provider. After all the drama, Isobel points her finger at each member of the meeting and "shoots" them individually, though real shots are heard.

Isobel clings to Rhonda's feet as they move onto the next scene, where Rhonda meets a friend, Joanne, at a bar. Joanne shares that she has cancer, and asks Rhonda to help her plan out an Ophelia-like suicide. As they leave the bar, Isobel realizes her purgatorial state and that she wants to go to heaven. She follows the bartender, David, to confession with his childhood priest. At confession, David realizes he is also long dead.

In Act Two, Isobel starts looking to protect rather than be protected. It begins with Isobel in a playground again, warning the people around that the Lion in the Streets is coming. She follows Christine from the park to an interview with a young woman with cerebral palsy named Scarlet. Scarlet shares a private topic but is betrayed by Christine, who threatens to publish it. Scarlet begins to provoke Christine, who then attacks and kills Scarlet. Isobel calls Christine a "slave" of the Lion, and follows her to the next scene, where she hopes to find the Lion.

Christine's assistant, Rodney, has an unpleasant conversation with her and then receives an unexpected visit from an old friend. The friend, Michael, alludes to their youthful sexual experimentation and accuses Rodney of being queer. They fight, and Rodney "kills" Michael. After Michael leaves, Rodney has a monologue about his interactions with Michael growing up. Sherry, his coworker, bursts in, tries to calm him down, and gives him some chocolate before she goes home. Isobel watches a conversation between Sherry and her boyfriend quickly escalate into a fight where he makes her relive a rape that happened to her years before. He makes her say that it was her fault, to satisfy his own fantasies. The scene ends with Sherry continuing to talk about preparing for their wedding.

Sherry and Isobel then walk over to the graveyard where Ben, Isobel's murderer, (a.k.a. the Lion) is sitting. Sherry lays down at her grave, and as Ben continues to tell his story of justification of why he killed Isobel, she confronts him. She tells her part of the story and has an internal battle between vengeance and forgiveness. Forgiveness wins: she tells Ben "I love you" and asks him for her life back. Now appearing as an adult, Isobel tells the audience that though he took her heart, her heart was never silent, and she urges the audience to take back their lives.

== Background ==
After 1953 there was a large influx of Portuguese immigrants to Canada, seeking economic opportunity and political freedom. 69% of Portuguese Canadians live in Ontario, and many are in Toronto. Isobel comes from a Portuguese family in Toronto and her strong accent indicates that her family has not lived in Canada for very long. One of the themes of the play is the difficult lives experienced by immigrants (shown by Isobel's father's job as a manual laborer, and his subsequent suicide).

== Structure and Inspiration ==
Lion in the Streets is a series of shorter scenes or vignettes linked by the character of Isobel. The playwright, Judith Thompson, said: "I thought I just can’t bear some giant narrative, somebody taking this immense journey. So I thought, well, write a bunch of little plays, like two women in a restaurant and one says, ‘Guess what?’ I had no idea what it was going to be. It was an improvisation" (Zimmerman interview 188).

The scene-to-scene structure of Lion in the Streets is somewhat reminiscent of Arthur Schnitzler's La Ronde, which is made up of ten interlocking scenes between pairs of lovers, with each character appearing in two consecutive scenes. The difference with Lion in the Streets is that it has a main character, Isobel, whose thread we follow throughout the play as she witnesses the other scenes take place.

== Themes and Ideas ==
Isobel continually encounters evil and violence within the city; Judith Thompson is showing a sort of "hidden" side of Toronto and discussing issues that are often taboo. Isobel says that a lion lurks among us, which only she can point out. The play looks away from the "upper-class, male-centered, high-art paradigm" to "[locate] freedom and power for a lower-class, female, immigrant-child."

== Criticism ==
Critics have commented on the dream-like nature of the play: "Besides Isobel's ghostly presence, other aspects of the play are surreal as well; it begins with a circus-like dance in which masked actors swirl around the open stage... frightening, seemingly on the edge of losing control. Like the lion of the title, there's something wild here in the midst of apparent civilization, something untamed in a very dangerous way".

However, other critics have found the script "pretentious and shallow" and the character of Isobel "obnoxious."

== Awards ==
In 1991, Judith Thompson received a Floyd S. Chalmers Canadian Play Award for Lion in the Streets. This is a $25,000 award for plays by Canadian playwrights and performed in the Toronto area, named after Floyd Chalmers, the editor, publisher, and philanthropist.

== Adaptations ==
In 2002, Ed Gass-Donnelly directed a 6-minute film, Dying Like Ophelia, based on the scene between the characters Joanne and Rhonda.
