= 1958 Flinders state by-election =

1958 By-election in Queensland

- 17 May 1958
	First party	Second party	Third party
Candidate	Bill Longeran	Frank Forde	Bob Katter
Party	Country	Labor	Queensland Labor
Popular vote	1,948	1,534	780
Percentage	45.7	36.0	18.3
Swing	+11.3	+1.6	−7.5

The 1958 Flinders state by-election was a by-election held on 17 May 1958 for the Flinders seat in the Queensland Legislative Assembly. The by-election was triggered after the result of the 1957 state election in Flinders was declared void by an elections tribunal on 4 March 1958. The seat was won by the Country Party candidate Bill Longeran, who defeated the former Prime Minister of Australia Frank Forde and the Queensland Labor Party candidate Bob Katter.

== Background ==
The electoral district of Flinders was a rural electorate in outback Queensland, encompassing the towns of Charters Towers, Hughenden and Julia Creek.

Frank Forde, who had served as the 15th Prime Minister of Australia for eight days in July 1945 following the death of John Curtin, had won Flinders for Labor at the 1955 by-election and retained it at the 1956 state election. At the 1957 state election, held on 3 August 1957, Forde was defeated in Flinders by the Country Party candidate Bill Longeran by a single vote. The election also saw Labor lose government in Queensland after 25 years in office, following the Labor split that had led to the expulsion of Premier Vince Gair and the formation of the breakaway Queensland Labor Party. Among those who had left the ALP in the split was Bob Katter, who contested Flinders for the Queensland Labor Party at the 1957 election and again at the by-election, dividing the former Labor vote.

Forde disputed the result, arguing that a number of votes had been wrongly disallowed. The resulting elections tribunal, conducted by Mr Justice Philp, heard evidence on 17 February 1958 and, on 4 March 1958, ruled the election void on the grounds that a presiding officer had conducted the poll improperly. The voided result created the vacancy that led to the by-election.

== Candidates ==
Bill Longeran, who had been declared elected at the 1957 election before the result was overturned, again stood as the Country Party candidate.

Frank Forde again stood as the Labor candidate, seeking to reclaim the seat he had lost on the voided result.

Bob Katter stood for the Queensland Labor Party and had also contested Flinders at the 1957 election.

== Results ==
Longeran won the by-election with 45.7 per cent of the primary vote, ahead of Forde on 36.0 per cent and Katter on 18.3 per cent. Longeran's margin of 414 votes over Forde reversed the one-vote result of the disputed 1957 election.

Party	Candidate	Votes	%	±%
Country	Bill Longeran	1,948	45.7	+11.3
Labor	Frank Forde	1,534	36.0	+1.6
Queensland Labor	Bob Katter	780	18.3	−7.5
Total formal votes		4,262	99.7	+0.5
Informal votes		11	0.3	−0.5
Turnout		4,273	82.0	−5.1
Country hold

Swings are calculated against the voided 1957 election.

== Aftermath ==
Longeran held Flinders for the Country Party until 1974. He later served as Government Whip from 1971 to 1972 and was elected Speaker of the Queensland Legislative Assembly in August 1972.

It was reported that, had Forde been returned, he might have become leader of the state Labor Party, which was suffering from a shortage of experienced members following the split. Forde sought Labor preselection for Flinders once more in 1959 but was unsuccessful, the Queensland central executive deciding against him by twenty-seven votes to twenty-six. It was the last time he sought endorsement for public office. Forde remains the only former prime minister to have served in an Australian state parliament after holding the office of prime minister.

Bob Katter later joined the Country Party and won the federal seat of Kennedy in 1966, holding it until 1990. His son, Bob Katter, later represented Flinders in the Legislative Assembly from 1974 until the seat's abolition in 1992.

== See also ==
- Electoral district of Flinders (Queensland)
- Electoral results for the district of Flinders (Queensland)
- Frank Forde
- Bill Longeran
- 1955 Flinders state by-election
- 1957 Queensland state election
