= Parked =

- Theatrical release poster
- Directed by: Darragh Byrne
- Written by: Ciaran Creagh
- Story by: Darragh Byrne
- Produced by: Dominic Wright; Jacqueline Kerrin
- Starring: Colm Meaney; Colin Morgan; Milka Ahlroth; Stuart Graham
- Cinematography: John Conroy
- Edited by: Guy Montgomery; Gareth Young
- Music by: Niall Byrne
- Production companies: Ripple World Pictures; Helsinki Filmi Oy; Irish Film Board; Suomen Elokuvasäätiö; RTÉ
- Distributed by: Element Pictures (UK/Ireland)
- Release dates: 2 December 2010 (Turin); 14 October 2011 (Ireland); 25 November 2011 (UK)
- Running time: 94 minutes
- Countries: United Kingdom; Ireland; Finland
- Budget: €1.1 million

Parked is a 2010 drama film written by Ciaran Creagh and directed by Darragh Byrne about homelessness, friendship, and the will to survive adversity, whilst still retaining poise. It premiered at the 2010 Torino Film Festival

== Plot ==
Having returned from the UK to his native Ireland, middle-aged Fred lives an isolated life in his car, caught in a bureaucratic trap: Without social benefits he cannot afford to rent a room and without a permanent address, he is not entitled to social benefits. That all changes when he forms an unlikely friendship with Cathal, a dope-smoking 21-year-old with a positive attitude, who becomes his 'neighbour.' Sharing laughs and the hard times too, Fred and Cathal find some simple, free pleasures of life.

Cathal is determined to make Fred sort out his life and it works. Fred modifies his car, beats the system and makes a friend in Jules, an attractive music teacher who lives alone nearby. But Fred struggles with his pride to tell Jules about his 'home' and Cathal’s life is threatened by his escalating drug habit.

Fred's trust in Cathal is soon thwarted when he discovered Cathal injecting drugs into the veins of his feet. Cathal had sworn he had never injected, even showing Fred his arms as proof. Fred shouts at Cathal and then storms away to see Jules. While Fred is gone, Cathal is attacked by his drug dealer. Beaten and exhausted, Cathal breaks into his dad's house, begging for money. His dad refuses to pay, and Cathal leaves. He then shows up at a bonfire with other drug addicts. They steal his shoes in exchange for a needle. Cathal injects himself in the arm and passes out.

Fred returns to find Cathal's car trashed and his treasured watch broken. He searches everywhere for Cathal, and eventually finds him in the mortuary. Cathal has died, but not before succeeding in improving Fred's life. Jules knows about Fred living in a car, and Fred is on the way to having a place of his own thanks to Cathal's persuasion. In the end, Cathal still managed to save Fred, though he couldn't do the same for himself.

== Reception ==
=== Critical response ===
On Rotten Tomatoes, Parked has an approval rating of 64% based on 14 reviews, with an average rating of 5.1/10. On Metacritic, another review aggregator, the film has a score of 47 out of 100 based on 8 critics, indicating "mixed or average reviews".

== Cast ==
- Colm Meaney as Fred Daly

A man who returns to Dublin and has nowhere to live but his car, after working in England for years.

- Colin Morgan as Cathal O'Regan

A friendly young man who is a homeless drug addict, but becomes Fred's closest friend.

- Milka Ahlroth as Juliana (Jules)

An attractive Finnish music teacher and widow, whom Fred is attracted to.

- Stuart Graham as George O'Regan

A distant father who blames his son Cathal for his wife's death.

- Michael McElhatton as Frank

A drug dealer who is determined to get paid, no matter the means.

== Festivals ==
- Mosaico European Film Festival 2011
- Irish Film Festa Rome 2011
- Tallinn Black Nights Film Festival 2011
- Scanorama European Film Forum 2011
- Mannheim-Heidelberg International Film Festival 2011
- Busan International Film Festival 2011
- San Francisco Irish Film Festival 2011
- Irish Film New York 2011
- Helsinki International Film Festival Love & Anarchy 2011
- International Golden Boll Film Festival 2011
- Galway Film Festival
- Brussels Film Festival (BRFF) 2011
- Newport Beach Film Festival 2011
- Dallas International Film Festival 2011
- Irish Film Festival Boston 2011
- International Film Festival Rotterdam 2011
- Göteborg International Film Festival 2011
- Torino Film Festival 2010

== Awards and nominations ==
Awards
Year	Award	Category	Name	Outcome
2011
2011	Galway Film Fleadh	Best First Feature Award		Won
2011	International Filmfestival Mannheim-Heidelberg	Best Film (Main Award)		Won
2011	Brussels Film Festival	Best Film (Audience Award)		Won
2011	Dallas International Film Festival	Honourable Mention		Won
2011	Irish Film Festival Boston	Best Feature		Won
2011	Paris Close Up Film Festival	MK2 Jameson Best First Irish Feature Award		Won
2011	Irish Film & Television Academy	Best Actor in a Lead Role Film	Colm Meaney	Nominated
2011	Irish Film & Television Academy	Best Editing	Guy Montgomery	Nominated
2011	Irish Film & Television Academy	Best Original Score	Niall Byrne	Nominated
2011	Irish Film & Television Academy	Best Make-Up and Hair	Louise Myler	Nominated
