= 28th Torino Film Festival =

The 28th Torino Film Festival was held in 2010 in Turin, Italy. The festival jury included Marco Bellocchio, Barbora Bobuľová, Michel Ciment, Helmut Grasser and Joe R. Lansdale.

== Films in competition ==
- The Bang Bang Club (Steven Silver)
- Blessed Events (Isabelle Stever)
- Four Lions (Chris Morris)
- Henry (Alessandro Piva)
- The Infidel (Josh Appignanesi)
- It's Your Fault (Por tu culpa) (Anahí Berneri)
- Last Chestnuts (Ye Zhao)
- Marimbas From Hell (Julio Hernández Cordón)
- Men Standing (Jérémy Gravayat)
- Portrait of a Fighter as a Young Man (Constantin Popescu)
- Small Town Murder Songs (Ed Gass-Donnelly)
- Soulboy (Shimmy Marcus)
- Vampires (Vincent Lannoo)
- Vital Signs (Les Signes Vitaux) (Sophie Deraspe)
- White Irish Drinkers (John Gray)
- Winter's Bone (Debra Granik)

== Awards ==
- Best Film:
  - Winter's Bone (Debra Granik)
- Jury Special Prize:
  - Vital Signs (Sophie Deraspe)
  - Las Marimbas del Infierno (Julio Hernández Cordón)
- Best Actress:
  - Jennifer Lawrence (Winter's Bone)
  - Érica Rivas (Por Tu Culpa)
- Best Actor:
  - Omid Djalili (The Infidel)
- Audience Award:
  - Henry (Alessandro Piva)
- FIPRESCI Award:
  - Small Town Murder Songs (Ed Gass-Donnelly)
