= Better Than Chocolate =

1999 Canadian romantic comedy film

- Directed by: Anne Wheeler
- Written by: Peggy Thompson
- Produced by: Sharon McGowan; Peggy Thompson
- Starring: Wendy Crewson; Karyn Dwyer; Christina Cox; Ann-Marie MacDonald; Marya Delver; Kevin Mundy; Peter Outerbridge
- Cinematography: Gregory Middleton
- Edited by: Alison Grace
- Music by: Graeme Coleman
- Distributed by: Motion International; Trimark Pictures
- Release date: February 14, 1999
- Running time: 102 mins
- Country: Canada
- Language: English
- Budget: $1.6 million

Better Than Chocolate is a 1999 Canadian romantic comedy film shot in Vancouver and directed by Anne Wheeler.

== Plot ==
Maggie (Karyn Dwyer) has dropped out of university and moved out on her own, staying on a couch in the back of a bookstore selling LGBT literature. She receives a phone call from her mother Lila (Wendy Crewson), who is divorcing Maggie's father after learning of his affair. Lila and Maggie's brother, Paul, are forced to move in with Maggie, who has to scramble to find a loft sublet before their arrival.

Before Lila and Paul's arrive, Maggie meets Kim (Christina Cox), a traveling painter. The two begin a romantic relationship and, after Kim's campervan is impounded, she moves into Maggie's loft. Lila and Paul arrive and Maggie, whose family is unaware that she is a lesbian, tells them that Kim is her roommate. That night, Paul overhears Maggie and Kim having sex.

Frances (Ann-Marie MacDonald), the owner of the bookstore Maggie works at, is frustrated at her orders being repeatedly seized by Customs as obscene materials. Judy, a transgender woman who has romantic interest in Frances, enters and announces that her estranged father has written informing her that he has purchased a condominium for her to stay in while recuperating from her upcoming sex reassignment operation. She asks Frances on a date, but she deflects the question.

Judy comes to the loft and introduces herself to Lila, and the two form a friendship. Maggie cleans up homophobic graffiti outside the bookstore and visits Customs with Frances to complain, in vain, about the book seizures. As Lila settles in, her relationship with Maggie begins to improve, but Maggie still struggles to come out to her.

While at an LGBT nightclub, Judy confesses her feelings to Frances again, who shows more interest than before. While in the club bathroom, Judy suffers a transphobic attack that is interrupted by Maggie and Kim. Later, Frances tells Judy she needs more time before moving their relationship further. Meanwhile, Paul meets Carla, a bisexual coworker of Maggie's, and the two have sex.

Back at the loft, Lila discovers sex toys left by the sublessor and uses them, restoring some of her confidence in herself. The next morning, she asks Maggie and Kim if they are in a relationship. Maggie argues with her mother about her future and her need for independence but does not reveal the relationship, causing Kim to move out of the apartment in anger. She retrieves her campervan and meets with Judy before leaving town; the two urge one another to pursue their respective loves. Maggie is heartbroken over Kim's leaving.

Frances receives a tip that Customs will raid her store that night and admits defeat, but Maggie convinces her to take a stand. Lila learns that Judy is transgender when a delivery man inadvertently outs her. She is initially stunned, but after the delivery is revealed to be letter from Judy's father disowning her, the two vent their shared frustration at their mistreatment and, drunk, take a walk through the city.

Ahead of the raid, Maggie poses naked with signs in the window of the bookstore in protest. A group of men, responsible for the prior vandalism, threaten her from outside. Lila and Judy stumble onto the scene and force the men away. Lila makes an appeal to her daughter to repair their relationship, but the men return and throw flares into the building, igniting an open gas line in the adjacent business and causing an explosion that tears through the store, destroying any 'obscene' materials. Maggie and Lila, relatively unharmed, reconcile, while Frances arrives and confesses her love to Judy. Kim, having regretted leaving Maggie, returns in her campervan and embraces her.

A closing montage reveals the fates of the characters after the film's ending. Lila, who had an unpursued dream of singing, performs at a benefit show funding the bookstore's restoration. Judy and Frances marry, while Maggie's brother moves in with Carla. Maggie and Kim spend their time traveling between womyn's festivals and Maggie, who has long dreamed of pursuing writing, publishes her first novel, titled 'Better than Chocolate'.

== Cast ==
- Karyn Dwyer as Maggie
- Christina Cox as Kim
- Peter Outerbridge as Judy
- Ann-Marie MacDonald as Frances
- Wendy Crewson as Lila, Maggie's Mom
- Kevin Mundy as Paul, Maggie's Brother
- Marya Delver as Carla
- Tony Nappo as Tony
- Jay Brazeau as Mr. Marcus
- Beatrice Zeilinger as Bernice
- Veena Sood as Religious Zealot

== Background ==
The film was created with a budget of $1.6 million. It was co-produced by Peggy Thompson and Sharon McGowan.

The film takes its name from a lyric in Sarah McLachlan's song "Ice Cream", "Your love is better than chocolate". Veena Sood, the sister of McLachlan's then-husband Ashwin Sood, has a small role in the film as a religious protester.

The plot line about the bookstore is a fairly direct reference to Vancouver's Little Sister's Book and Art Emporium and its travails with Canada Customs. The bookstore is thanked in the credits. Ann-Marie MacDonald, who plays the bookstore's owner, is a well-known Canadian author.

The movie poster, which shows two women embracing and one woman's naked back, was banned by the Hong Kong Television and Entertainment Licensing Authority as it was deemed "offensive to public morality, decency and ordinary good taste." An advertisement in the San Diego Union-Tribune was also removed, due to the word "lesbian" being present on the movie poster.

== Soundtrack ==
The soundtrack of the film was released as a CD in 1999 on Lakeshore Records.

Track listing

1. Sexy - West End Girls
2. When I Think Of You - Melanie Dekker
3. 32 Flavors - Ani DiFranco
4. Julie Christie - Lorraine Bowen
5. Perfect Fingers - Tami Greer
6. Let's Have Sex - Studio Kings 2.0/Trippy
7. In My Mind - Trippy
8. My Place - Edgar
9. I'm Not A Fucking Drag Queen - Peter Outerbridge
10. Stand Up - Ferron
11. Night - Feisty
12. Long Gone - Kelly Brock
13. Pure (You're Touching Me) - West End Girls

== Reception ==
On the review aggregator website Rotten Tomatoes, 46% of 26 critics' reviews are positive, with an average rating of 6/10. The website's consensus reads: "Some things are Better Than Chocolate, while some are far worse – and this would-be romance fails to deliver a filling morsel." Metacritic, which uses a weighted average, assigned the film a score of 59 out of 100, based on 18 critics, indicating "mixed or average" reviews.

Stephen Holden of the New York Times gave the film a positive review and wrote: "the movie gushes with so much romantic optimism and good humor that it has the effervescence of an engaging musical comedy".

== Awards ==
The film screened at film festivals around the world and was ranked 31st on The Hollywood Reporter's Top 200 independent films list of 1999.

== See also ==
- List of LGBT films directed by women
