= 1945 Australian Labor Party leadership election =

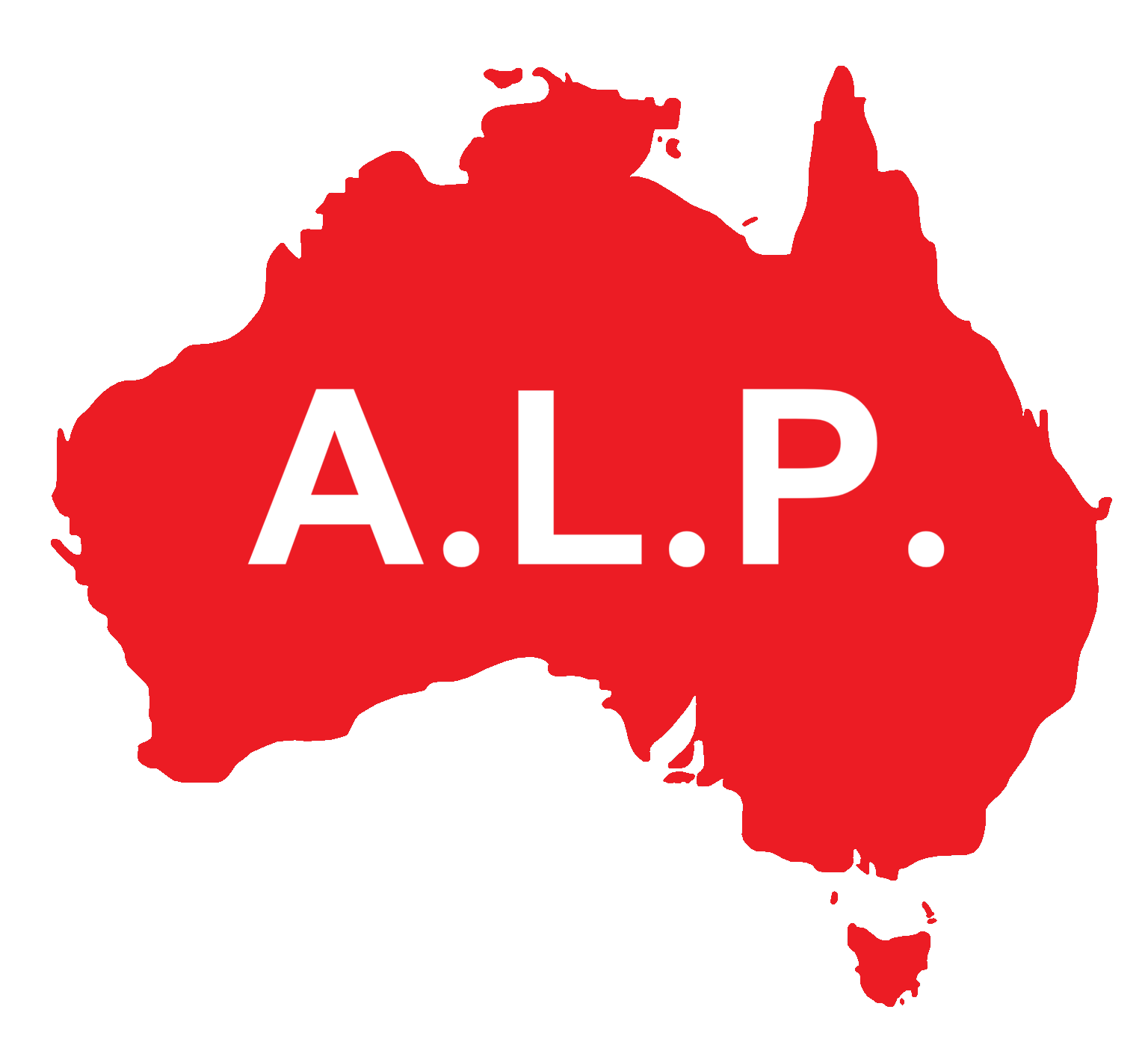
- 12 July 1945
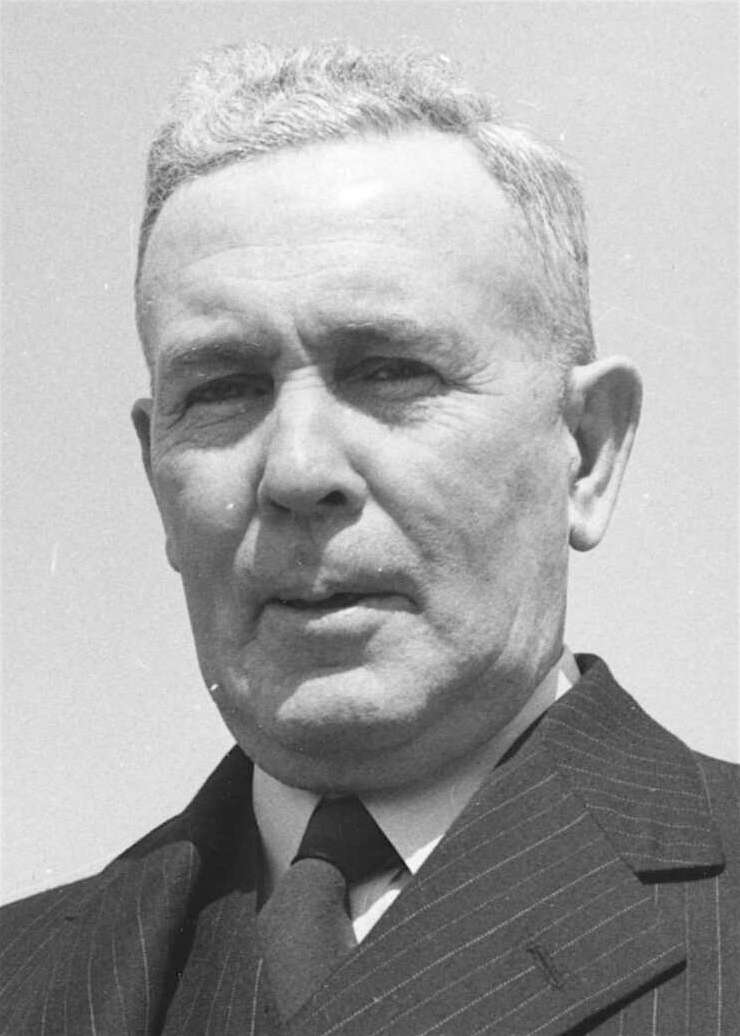

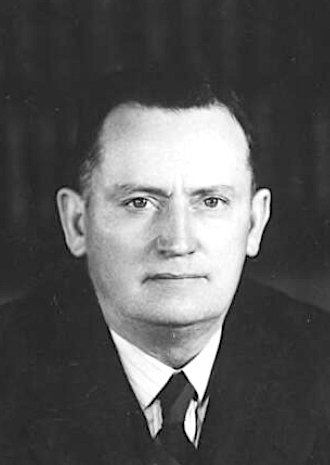

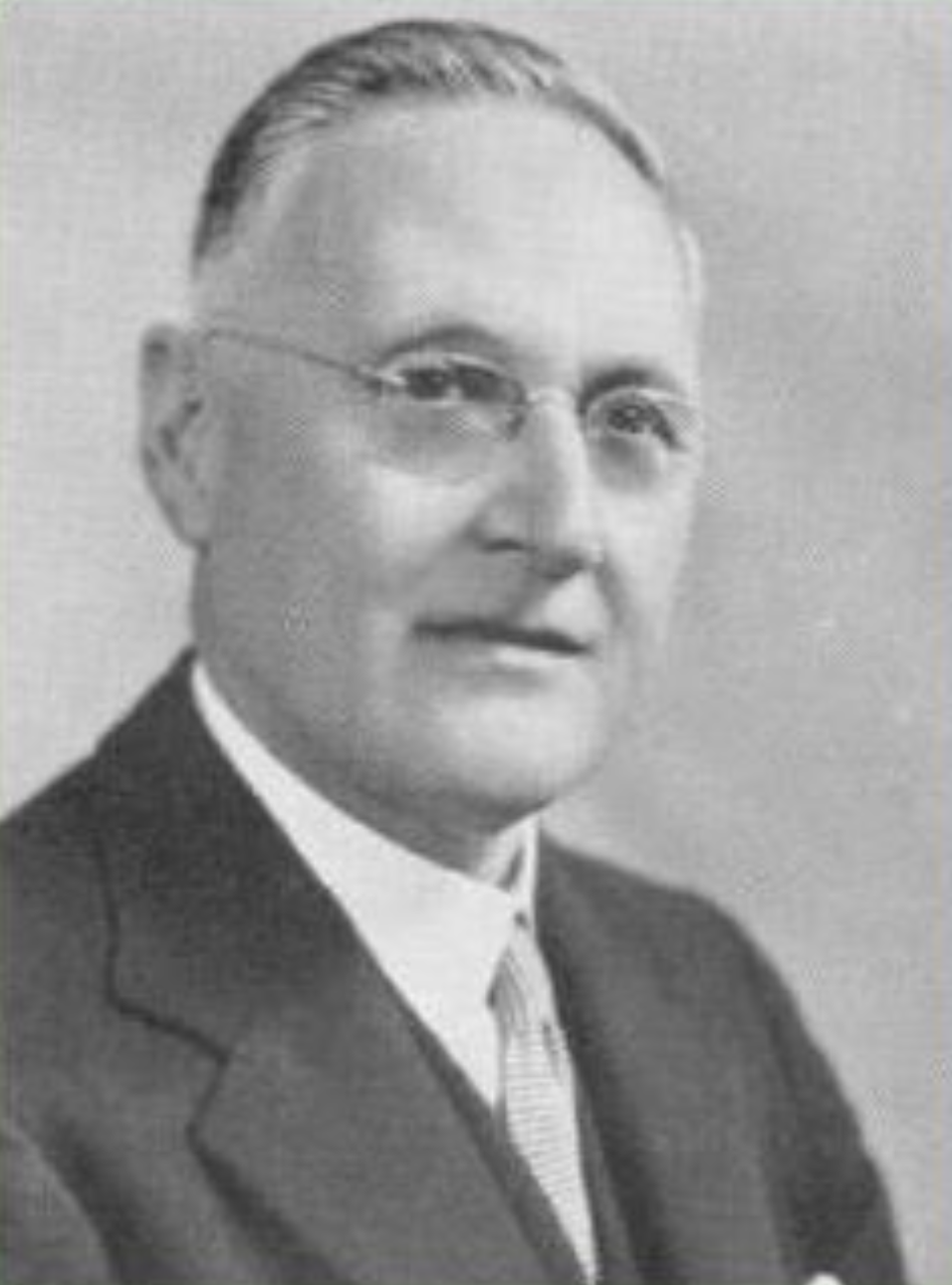

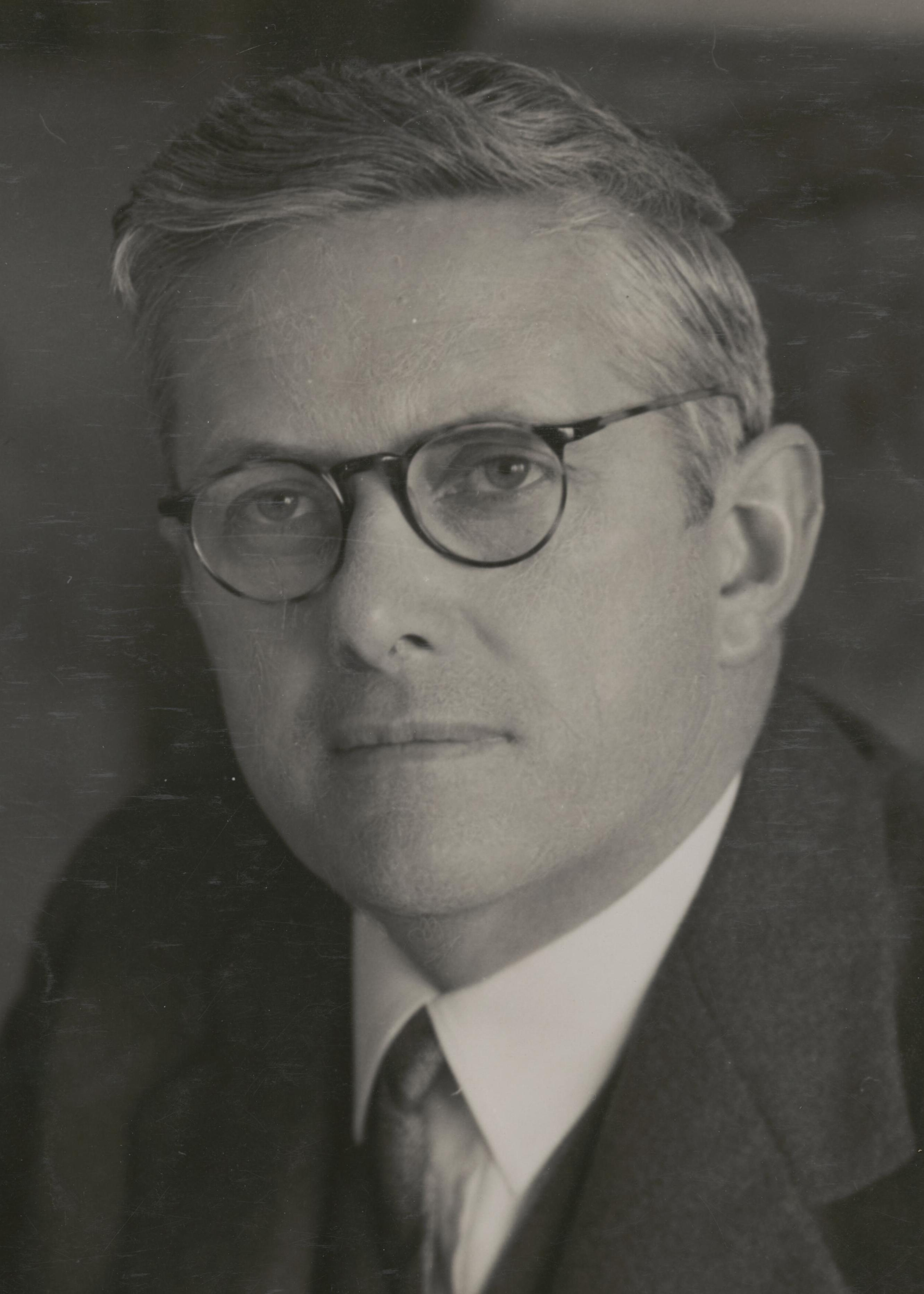
Candidate	Ben Chifley	Frank Forde
First Ballot	45 (64.3%)	16 (22.9%)
Candidate	Norman Makin	Herbert Evatt
First Ballot	7 (10.0%)	2 (2.9%)
Leader before election
John Curtin†
Frank Forde (Interim)
Elected Leader
Ben Chifley

The Australian Labor Party held a leadership election on 12 July 1945, following the death of Prime Minister John Curtin. Treasurer Ben Chifley won an absolute majority on the first ballot, defeating three other candidates: deputy leader and interim prime minister Frank Forde, navy minister Norman Makin, and attorney-general Herbert Evatt.

== Background ==
John Curtin, party leader since 1935 and prime minister since 1941, suffered a fatal heart attack at The Lodge on 5 July 1945, after months of ill health. His deputy, Frank Forde, was sworn in as interim prime minister the following day, with the understanding that he would resign if the Labor Party did not elect him as leader. Curtin's state funeral was held in Perth on 8 July. Forde, as acting leader, scheduled a leadership election for Thursday, 12 July, despite the objections of allies of H. V. Evatt – who was overseas – that this would leave him no time to return to Australia and campaign. On 10 July, Forde and Chifley both announced their intention to stand for the leadership. Norman Makin announced his candidacy the next day. All 70 members of the Labor caucus (including three who were absent and voted by proxy) participated in the ballot. Chifley won 45 votes, Forde won 16, Makin won seven, and Evatt won two. Forde was subsequently re-elected unopposed as deputy leader. Chifley was sworn in as prime minister the following day, 13 July.

== Results ==
The following table gives the ballot results:

Results
Candidate	Vote(s)	V%
Ben Chifley	45	64.2%
Frank Forde	16	22.9%
Norman Makin	7	10%
Herbert Evatt	2	2.9%
	70 (Note: Three Labor MPs were absent; these votes were via proxy.)	100%

== See also ==
- Other leadership ballots held following the death of a prime minister:
  - 1939 United Australia Party leadership election
  - 1968 Liberal Party of Australia leadership election
- Chifley government
- 1946 Australian federal election
