= William Robert Thompson =

Canadian psychologist and behavior geneticist

William Thompson
- Born: William Robert Thompson; 1923/1924; Toulon, France
- Died: October 22, 1979
- Education: University of Toronto; University of Chicago
- Spouse: Mary Forde
- Children: Judith Thompson; William Forde Thompson
- Scientific career
- Fields: Behavioral genetics
- Institutions: McGill University; Wesleyan University; Queen's University at Kingston
- Thesis: Discrimination behavior of the cat after selective ablation of visual cortical areas (1951)
- Academic advisors: Donald O. Hebb

William Robert Thompson (1923/1924 – October 22, 1979) was a French-born Canadian psychologist. With John L. Fuller, he co-authored a 1960 book entitled Behavior Genetics that is credited with launching the field of behavioral genetics.

== Biography ==
Thompson was born in Toulon, France, in either 1923 or 1924, to Canadian parents. He received his B.A. in philosophy and M.A. in psychology from the University of Toronto in 1945 and 1947, respectively. He served as a teaching fellow at Queen's University at Kingston in 1947 before receiving his Ph.D. from the University of Chicago in 1951. At Hebb's suggestion, Thompson began working at the Jackson Laboratory, where he began working in Fuller's lab in 1952, doing research with mice. He then worked at McGill University (where he was a research associate of Donald Hebb) and Wesleyan University before returning to Queen's University to become the head of the Psychology Department in 1966. He remained head of this department until 1972. He held a Guggenheim Fellowship from 1959 to 1960. From 1963 to 1964, he was a fellow of the Center for Advanced Study in the Behavioral Sciences, and from 1977 to 1978, he was president of the Behavior Genetics Association, of which he was a founding member. He was a recipient of a 1978–1979 James McKeen Cattell Fund Fellowship. He was diagnosed with untreatable cancer in 1978, and died on October 22, 1979.
