= Dying Like Ophelia =

- Directed by: Ed Gass-Donnelly
- Written by: Judith Thompson
- Based on: Lion in the Streets by Judith Thompson
- Starring: Karyn Dwyer
- Production company: Veni Vidi Vici Motion Pictures
- Release date: 2002
- Running time: 6 minutes
- Country: United States
- Language: English

Dying Like Ophelia is a 2002 six-minute drama, directed by Ed Gass-Donnelly and starring Karyn Dwyer. The film was produced by Veni Vidi Vici Motion Pictures and based on an excerpt of the play Lion in the Streets by Judith Thompson.

== Plot ==
A young working-class mother dying of cancer wishes to die a beautiful and poetic death like that portrayed in Millais's famous painting of Ophelia.

== Critical reception ==
Film Threat, "The drama is so thick that by its end you want to drag the two women to a taping of Dr. Phil. Director Ed Gass-Donnelly must have a secret love for emotionally disturbed women because this is his second short on the tortured female. Shot well but lost in an utter state of misery, Donnelly has the directing chops to get what he needs from his actors, but it’s lost in over dramatic dialogue best suited for beatnik poets and ultra depressive pop artists."
