= Music, Thought, and Feeling =

2009 book by William Forde Thompson

Music, Thought, and Feeling: Understanding the Psychology of Music
- First edition
- Author: William Forde Thompson
- Language: English
- Publisher: Oxford University Press
- Publication date: 2008
- ISBN: 978-0-19-537707-1
- Dewey Decimal: 781/.11 22
- LC Class: ML3830 .T496 2009

Music, Thought, and Feeling: Understanding the Psychology of Music is a book written by psychologist William Forde Thompson and published in 2009 by Oxford University Press. The 2nd edition was published in 2014.

== Reviews ==
In July, 2009, Victoria Williamson reviewed the book for Psychology of Music (Volume 37, Number 3). Williamson wrote "Music, Thought, and Feeling definitely fills a gap in the current literature. It is an excellent and, I am sure, extremely welcome resource for anyone who is planning a course on music cognition, either at undergraduate or graduate level. This is thanks to the combination of accessible and engaging language, clear structure, and relevant and illustrative resources. The demeanour of the book is one that assumes no specific artistic or scientific background: Just a desire to engage with the modern issues of music cognition."

In his 2009 review of the book for Musicae Scientiae (Volume 13, Number 2), Tuomas Eerola wrote "Music, Thought, and Feeling is an important pedagogical contribution to the field as it not only manages to pull together the strings of the last thirty years of research from a broad range of topics within music cognition, but it performs this in a highly accessible format, and written in an enthusiastic and analytic style."

In his 2009 review for the journal Music Perception, Edward Large (Florida Atlantic University) wrote: "Music Thought and Feeling is a really great textbook. What it does best is capture the great variety of our field, deftly weaving together theory and empirical results into a compelling narrative that provides a unique snapshot of our discipline and a time of unprecedented expansion. ... [It is] a well conceived and attractively produced work that surveys our field as it is practiced today, and in a way that is compelling ..."
