= Palace of the End =

Play by Judith Thompson

For the former Baghdad prison, see Qasr al-Nihayah. Palace of the End is a play by Judith Thompson, that consists of three monologues telling tales related to Iraq before and after the 2003 invasion of Iraq. The first two are based on real people Lynndie England and David Kelly and the third is fictional. Palace of the End was published in 2007 by Playwrights Canada Press.

The play ran in Los Angeles in 2007, at Canadian Stage Company in Toronto in 2008, at Playwrights Horizons in New York in 2008, at the Frank Theatre Studio in Minneapolis, Minnesota, in 2009 and at the Arcola Theatre in London in 2010. It won the 2007–08 Susan Smith Blackburn Prize and the Amnesty International Freedom of Expression Awards at the 2009 Edinburgh Festival Fringe.

== The monologues ==
The monologue's titles are "My Pyramids", "Harrowdown Hill", and "Instruments of Yearning".

“My Pyramids” refers to the Abu Ghraib human pyramids. The speaker is Lynndie England, the United States Army reservist who become the face of the Abu Ghraib torture and prisoner abuse, and who is said to have made prisoners form human pyramids.

"Harrowdown Hill" refers to the place where the body of Dr. David Kelly was found a few weeks after he confessed to a journalist that he had lied about the existence of weapons of mass destruction in Iraq. Kelly was a British weapons inspector in Iraq.

"Instruments of Yearning" refers to the Jihaz al-Haneen, the secret police of the Ba'ath Party who detained fictional character Nehrjas Al Saffarh, an Iraqi communist, in 1963. Saffarh survived but was killed during United States bombing in the 1991 Persian Gulf War.

== See also ==
- David Kelly
- Iraq Dossier
