= Small Town Murder Songs =

- Theatrical poster
- Directed by: Ed Gass-Donnelly
- Written by: Ed Gass-Donnelly
- Produced by: Lee Kim; Ed Gass-Donnelly
- Starring: Peter Stormare; Martha Plimpton; Aaron Poole; Jill Hennessy
- Cinematography: Brendan Steacy
- Edited by: Ed Gass-Donnelly
- Music by: Bruce Peninsula
- Production companies: 3 Legged Dog Films; Resolute Films and Entertainment
- Distributed by: Kinosmith (Canada); Monterey Media (United States)
- Release dates: September 14, 2010 (TIFF); May 26, 2011 (United States)
- Running time: 76 minutes
- Country: Canada
- Languages: English; Low German
- Box office: $30,858

Small Town Murder Songs is a 2010 Canadian neo-noir crime film directed by Ed Gass-Donnelly. The film premiered at the Toronto International Film Festival on September 14, 2010. The film is written by Gass-Donnelly, produced by Gass-Donnelly and Lee Kim, and stars Peter Stormare, Jill Hennessy, and Martha Plimpton.

Small Town Murder Songs was shot in Baden, Conestogo Lake, Listowel, and Palmerston in Ontario, Canada.

The film has been given a limited theatrical release in the United States beginning on May 26, 2011.

== Plot ==
"A modern, gothic tale of crime and redemption about an aging police officer from a small Ontario Mennonite town who hides a violent past until a local murder upsets the calm of his newly reformed life."

Stephen Holden, writing for The New York Times, explained the story:

Ed Gass-Donnelly's rural crime drama, Small Town Murder Songs, punctures the veneer of bucolic quiet in a mostly Mennonite farming community in Ontario. Beneath a deceptive calm, it uncovers a core of fear and loathing as ominous as the backwoods world of Winter's Bone. The protagonist, Walter (Peter Stormare), is a stocky, middle-aged policeman whose violent past has made him a local pariah... Walter's newfound equilibrium is put to the test when the body of a young woman is found near a lake. It is the town's first murder in decades. The 911 phone call reporting the discovery is quickly traced to Rita, who lies to the police when questioned and insists that her new lover, Steve (Stephen Eric McIntyre), was with her on the evening of the crime. The investigation quickly reveals that Steve and the victim were both seen that night at a nearby strip club.

== Cast ==
- Peter Stormare as Walter
- Martha Plimpton as Sam
- Aaron Poole as Jim
- Jill Hennessy as Rita
- Jackie Burroughs as Olive
- Ari Cohen as Washington
- Stephen Eric McIntyre as Steve
- Trent McMullen as Officer Kevin
- Alexandria Benoit as Sarah
- Amy Rutherford as Ava
- Kat Germain as Jenny

== Release ==
Monterey Media acquired the United States distribution rights in 2011. The limited United States theatrical release began at the O-Cinema in Wynwood, Miami, Florida. Monterey Media release the film on DVD in July 2011.

=== Festivals ===
Small Town Murder Songs was selected at the following film festivals:

- Santa Catalina Film Festival - Winner Best Feature
- Phoenix Film Festival - World Cinema Director
- Whistler Film Festival - WINNER Best Actress
- Torino Film Festival - WINNER Fipresci Critic’s Prize Best Film
- International Film Festival Rotterdam
- Toronto International Film Festival
- Hamptons International Film Festival
- Cucalorus Film Festival
- Palm Springs International Film Festival
- Santa Barbara International Film Festival
- Cinequest Film Festival
- Miami International Film Festival
- Cleveland International Film Festival
- Vail Film Festival
- Dallas International Film Festival
- Minneapolis-St. Paul International Film Festival
- Reel Dakota Film Society/Film Festival
- Seattle International Film Festival
- Indianapolis International Film Festival

== Reception ==
On Rotten Tomatoes, the film has an approval rating of 79%, based on reviews from 19 critics, with an average score of 6.07/10. On Metacritic, the film has a score of 66 out of 100, based on reviews from 10 critics, indicating "generally favorable reviews".

Stephen Cole from The Globe and Mail wrote a positive review, saying, "STMS succeeds as an Ontario Gothic mood piece". Michael Rechtshafen of The Hollywood Reporter wrote that Small Town Murder Songs is "An effective ensemble backed by a bracingly haunting soundtrack" after its screening at the Santa Barbara International Film Festival; he also saw similarities with Winter's Bone and found "much to admire about this carefully drawn but concise character sketch, especially the strong performances and a unique, affectingly ominous score by folk-rock-gospel outfit Bruce Peninsula... The already dense ambience gets progressively heavier as the investigation continues, with Gass-Donnelly keeping a tight grip on the artful compositions. But as strong as those visuals are, what really ends up lingering long after the lights come up, is that Greek chorus of a soundtrack, its fire-and-brimstone, gothic-tinged take on traditional and original spirituals packing an unsettling, pious punch."

Dustin Hucks with Ain't It Cool News also saw the film at The Santa Barbara International Film Festival and said, "Small Town Murder Songs is definitely a winner in the stable of films showing at the Santa Barbara International Film Festival this year". Holden of the New York Times wrote that the film "is not really a whodunit but a character study of a man squeezed in a psychological, spiritual and professional vise... Small Town Murder Songs is compellingly acted from top to bottom. As the raw passions of its hard-bitten characters seep into you, the songs hammer them even more deeply into your consciousness. The film's only flaw — a big one — is its brevity. When it ends after 76 minutes, you are left wishing it had included Walter's back story and had offered a more detailed picture of the town."

Shannon from Movie Moxie had wonderful things to say about the film: "The powerful score sets an impressive and all-encompassing atmosphere to the film". Robert Bell from Exclaim! had pleasant things to say about the film, stating that there were "some impressive cinematography and an understanding of tone through stillness and minor stylization make for a pleasant experience aesthetically". Howard Feinstein from Screen Daily praised writer/director Gass-Donnelly: "Ed Gass-Donnelly makes appropriate, unpretentiously artful, stylistic choices in this tale of redemption".

Alison Willmore of The A.V. Club, gave the film a grade B, with particular praise for the songs: "Who's responsible for the killing is never much of a mystery in Small Town Murder Songs; there are no dark conspiracies, only dark natures. The tension instead focuses on whether Stormare will be able to rein himself in when the investigation inexorably pulls him toward his old life. Everyone is so restrained, their turmoil buried so deep, that the depth of what they're feeling has to be excavated from what's left unsaid."

== Awards ==
It won Best Feature at the 2011 Santa Catalina Film Festival and won Fipresci Critic’s Prize Best Film at the 2010 Torino International Film Festival.

Martha Plimpton won Best Actress at the 2010 Whistler International Film Festival for her performance in this film. Ed Gass-Donnelly won World Cinema Director at the 2011 Phoenix Film Festival.
