= Judith Thompson =

Canadian playwright

Judith Clare Thompson OC
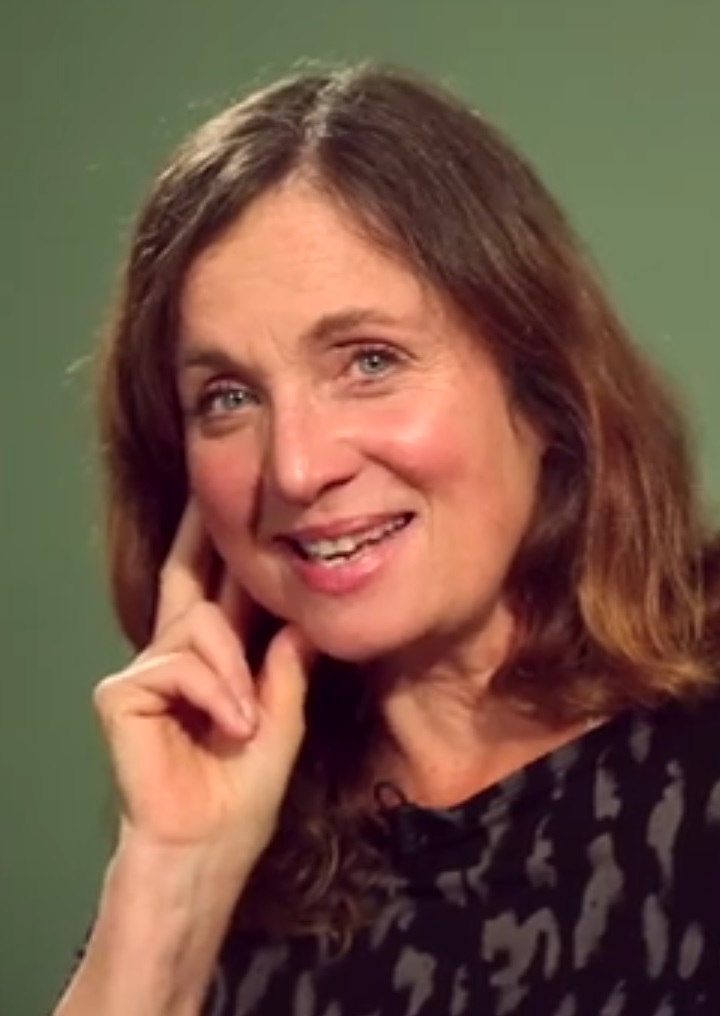
- Thompson in 2013
- Born: September 20, 1954 (age 71); Montreal, Quebec, Canada
- Education: Queen's University; National Theatre School of Canada
- Occupation: Playwright
- Parent: William Robert Thompson
- Writing career
- Notable awards: Governor General's Award 1984 White Biting Dog; Governor General's Award 1989 The Other Side of the Dark; Susan Smith Blackburn Prize 2007–2008 Palace of the End

Judith Clare Thompson, OC (born September 20, 1954) is a Canadian playwright. She has twice been awarded the Governor General's Award for drama, and is the recipient of many other awards including the Order of Canada, the Walter Carsen Performing Arts Award, the Toronto Arts Award, The Epilepsy Ontario Award, The B'nai B'rith Award, the Dora, the Chalmers, the Susan Smith Blackburn Award (a global competition for the best play written by a woman in the English Language) and the Amnesty International Freedom of Expression Award, both for Palace of the End, which premiered at Canadian Stage, and has been produced all over the world in many languages. She has received honorary doctorates from Thorneloe University and, in November 2016, Queen's University in Kingston, Ontario.

== Early years ==
Thompson was born in Montreal, Quebec, the daughter of William Robert Thompson, a geneticist and the head of the Department of Psychology at Queen's University at Kingston, and Mary, who taught in the Queens Drama Department for many years. She is also the sister of William Forde Thompson, a professor of psychology who composed music for a number of Judith's radio and stage plays, and the granddaughter of former Australian prime minister Frank Forde. Thompson was raised in Middletown, Connecticut and then Kingston, Ontario. She studied drama at Queen's (1973-1976) and then acting at the National Theatre School of Canada (1976-1979) in Montreal. Thompson worked as an actor for a while, but then concentrated on playwrighting.

== Career as a playwright ==
While in a mask class at NTS, Thompson developed the character of Theresa, inspired by a young woman she had met while working as an assistant social worker during one summer in Kingston, Ontario. This character was to provide the core of Thompson's first play The Crackwalker (1980), which focuses on four people struggling with economic hardship, anger issues resulting in domestic abuse, and patronizing societal attitudes. In 1991, CBC reviewer, Jerry Wasserman called the Vancouver Fringe Festival production, The Diamond among the pebbles ... Maybe the most powerful play ever written in Canada about two down and out couples in Kingston Ontario living on the edge, the outer edge of respectability, and trying to make some sense of their lives – to find love and a kind of domestic normality under the worst conceivable conditions. It's a very, very disturbing play and I think a deeply tragic play about the lowest depths one can imagine in a Canadian city. About a Vancouver production with the same cast at the Firehall Arts Centre in 1993, The Vancouver Sun's Barbara Crook wrote, The Crackwalker is not theatre for the timid. Judith Thompson’s first play is a graphic, harrowing glimpse at life on the edge, at individuals battered by poverty, ignorance and hopelessness. It is also a brilliant piece of stagecraft that makes use of every well-chosen word and powerfully dramatic moment to force audience members to confront their own darker sides. If you're looking for theatre that takes you to the edge of hell, The Crackwalker fits the bill.

Thompson's second play, White Biting Dog (1984), was an expressionistic and poetic black comedy about an eccentric and wildly self-destructive family. Her third play was I Am Yours (1987).

Lion in the Streets (1990) uses a structure similar to Arthur Schnitzler's La Ronde to follow violent and cruel impulses from one character to another, a route which the ghost of a young murdered girl, Isobel, uses to track down her killer. A penultimate scene which Thompson cut after the first workshop production of the play, was restored for the 1999 Theatre Kingston production, and Thompson has since then included the scene in all published editions. Productions of the play have been held in a wide variety of North American locations, including Toronto, Chicago, New York, Los Angeles, Portland and Vancouver, but also Łódź, Poland. In 1991, Thompson adapted and directed Henrik Ibsen's Hedda Gabler for the Shaw Festival. A remount of Thompson's adaptation appeared at Buddies in Bad Times Theatre in 2005. Her adaptation was also performed at the Mainline Theatre in Montreal in February 2008. Her translation of Serge Boucher's Motel Hélène appeared at the Tarragon Theatre in 2001. In 1995 Youtheatre (Montreal) premiered Thompson's first play for young audiences, the multi-lingual Leaves Of Forever, including a national tour. It was directed by Michel Lefebvre with music by Canadian composer Derek Aasland.

Sled (1997), which began life as a seven-hour play called The Last Things, but was later cut down to three hours, attempts again to pursue human violence back to its sources. Thompson first wrote Perfect Pie as a short monologue for television in 1993, but in 2000 expanded the story into full-length play about two teenaged girls whose lives diverge dramatically after a violent incident. In 2002, Perfect Pie was also made into a feature film of that name. Habitat, which premiered in 2001 at CanStage, the major regional theatre in Toronto, shows how a middle-class community is torn apart into factions when a group home for troubled youth is established on a quiet residential street. Capture Me, which premiered in early 2004 at the Tarragon Theatre in Toronto, is centred on a kindergarten teacher who, while searching for her birth mother, is stalked by her violent ex-husband. Such Creatures premiered at Theatre Passe Muraille in 2011, and The Thrill premiered at the Stratford Festival in 2013. She wrote and performed her play Watching Glory Die in 2014, premiering at The Cultch in Vancouver, and then produced at the Berkley Street Theatre later that year.

In 2007 Thompson created the play Body and Soul with 14 women between the ages of 45 and 80, about women and aging, using the performer's own words and experiences. The play premiered at Soulpepper, and then had a second production at the Tarragon the following year. The Vancouver Olympics brought the play there during the Para Olympics, to great acclaim. The success of this verbatim play inspired Thompson to create a play with 9 performers with Down Syndrome for the Fringe Festival of 2012, called Rare. It was a hit of the Fringe, and then was invited by Soulpepper to be part of "Winter at the Young." It was a sold out hit which extended three times, and toured to several places. It was then that the RARE theatre company was formed (raretheatre.org) Judith Thompson is the artistic director of this theatre, which is dedicated to collaborating with communities which are rarely heard and seldom seen on our stages. The company then went on to produce a play in partnership with Spinal Injury Ontario, with 9 artists who use wheelchairs. The play was called Borne, and played at Soulpepper in the summer of 2014, again, to sold out houses.

Thompson continues to write her own plays for the theatre, including Watching Glory Die (2012, Cultch and Berkley st. Theatre) inspired by the life and death of Ashley Smith. Ashley strangled herself with six c.o.s watching, as they were instructed not to go in till she was blue. Her death was later declared a homicide. Judith performed this play solo, playing all three characters.

In the summer of 2018, 4th Line Theatre produced her play, Who Killed Snow White? The play is inspired by tragedies such as the death of Reteah Parsons, a Nova Scotia girl who was raped and then cyber bullied, and finally took her own life. It starred local children playing the characters at a young age and a core of eight professionals, including Grace Thompson, Judith Thompson's daughter, as the central character, Serena. Her latest play, Queen Maeve, premiered at the Here For Now theatre in Stratford in September 2023, with the great Clare Coulter playing the lead. Clare has starred in two of Thompson's premieres: White Biting Dog, and I Am Yours.

She is currently a Professor of theatre studies at the University of Guelph, in the School of English and Theatre Studies. She is married to Dr. Gregor Campbell, who teaches English at the University of Guelph. They have five adult children - Ariane, Elias, Grace, Felicity, and Sophia - as well as grandchildren.

== Awards and honours ==
Thompson won the Governor General’s Award for Drama in 1984 for her play White Biting Dog, and in 1989 for a collection of her plays, The Other Side of the Dark. She has won a Toronto Arts Award and the Canadian Authors Association Award. She is the recipient of several Floyd S. Chalmers Canadian Play Awards, including one in 1987 for I Am Yours, and in 1991 for Lion in the Streets. Tornado won an award for Best Radio Drama in 1988. Thompson has received several Dora Mavor Moore Awards from the Toronto Alliance for the Performing Arts. In 2005, she was made an Officer of the Order of Canada, and in 2007 she was awarded the Walter Carsen Prize for Excellence in the Performing Arts by the Canada Council for the Arts. In 2008 she became the first Canadian to be awarded Susan Smith Blackburn Prize, which recognizes outstanding women playwrights each year.

She was awarded an honorary doctorate in sacred letters by Thorneloe University and another from Queen's University.

== Major works ==
- The Crackwalker – 1980
- White Biting Dog – 1984
- Turning to Stone – 1986
- I Am Yours – 1987
- Lion in the Streets – 1990
- Sled – 1997
- Perfect Pie – 2000
- Habitat – 2001
- Lost and Delirious – 2001
- Capture Me – 2004
- Enoch Arden, by Alfred Lord Jabber and his catatonic songstress – 2005
- Palace of the End – 2007
- Such Creatures – 2010
- The Thrill – 2013
- Watching Glory Die – 2014
- Hot House - 2016
- Who Killed Snow White - 2018
- Queen Maeve - 2023
