= William Forde Thompson =

William Forde "Bill" Thompson is an academic who has worked in Canada, Sweden and Australia. He is an Emeritus Professor at Macquarie University in Sydney, Australia, where he was Distinguished Professor of Psychology (2017- ) and Chair of the Department between 2009 and 2013. He currently works at Bond University, Queensland, Australia, and previously held positions at University of Toronto and York University in Toronto. His research focuses on music, emotion, expertise, and performance.

From 2007 to 2009, he was president of the Society for Music Perception and Cognition. In 2024 he was presented with a Lifetime achievement award from the Society for Music Perception and Cognition, during the society meeting in Banff, Canada. He was an associate editor at Music Perception, former editor of Empirical Musicology Review (2008–2010), and chief investigator of the ARC Centre of Excellence in Cognition and its Disorders. He is a fellow of the Association for Psychological Science.

Born in Middletown, Connecticut, US, Thompson holds a BSc in psychology from McGill University (Montreal, Canada) and an MA and PhD in psychology from Queen's University (Kingston, Canada). He is the author of Music, Thought, and Feeling: Understanding the Psychology of Music, Oxford University Press [US], 2009 (1st edition), 2014 (2nd edition), editor for the Encyclopedia of Music in the Social and Behavioral Sciences published by Sage Press in 2014, and co-editor of The Science and Psychology of Music: From Beethoven at the Office to Beyonce at the Gym, published by Greenwood in 2021.

In addition to his academic work, Thompson has composed and performed music for a number of films and plays, including several by his sister, Canadian playwright Judith Thompson. He is the grandson of former Australian prime minister Frank Forde. He is married to Dr. Pat Diamond, formerly Professor of Education at the Ontario Institute for Studies in Education, University of Toronto.
