= Louis Goldring =

Australian storekeeper and politician

Louis Goldring (1857 – 8 October 1934) was a storekeeper and politician in the Colony of Queensland. He was a member of the Queensland Legislative Assembly for Flinders.

== Biography ==
Louis Goldring was born in 1857 in London, England, the son of Henry Goldring and his wife Abigail (née Silverton).

Goldring was a prominent citizen of Hughenden and the first mayor of the Town of Hughenden. He was a member of the Queensland Legislative Assembly from 1888 to 1893, representing the electorate of Flinders. Goldring was a supporter of Samuel Griffith.

Goldring died on Mon 8 October 1934 in Townsville.
