= Frank Forde =

Prime Minister of Australia in 1945

The Right Honourable Frank Forde
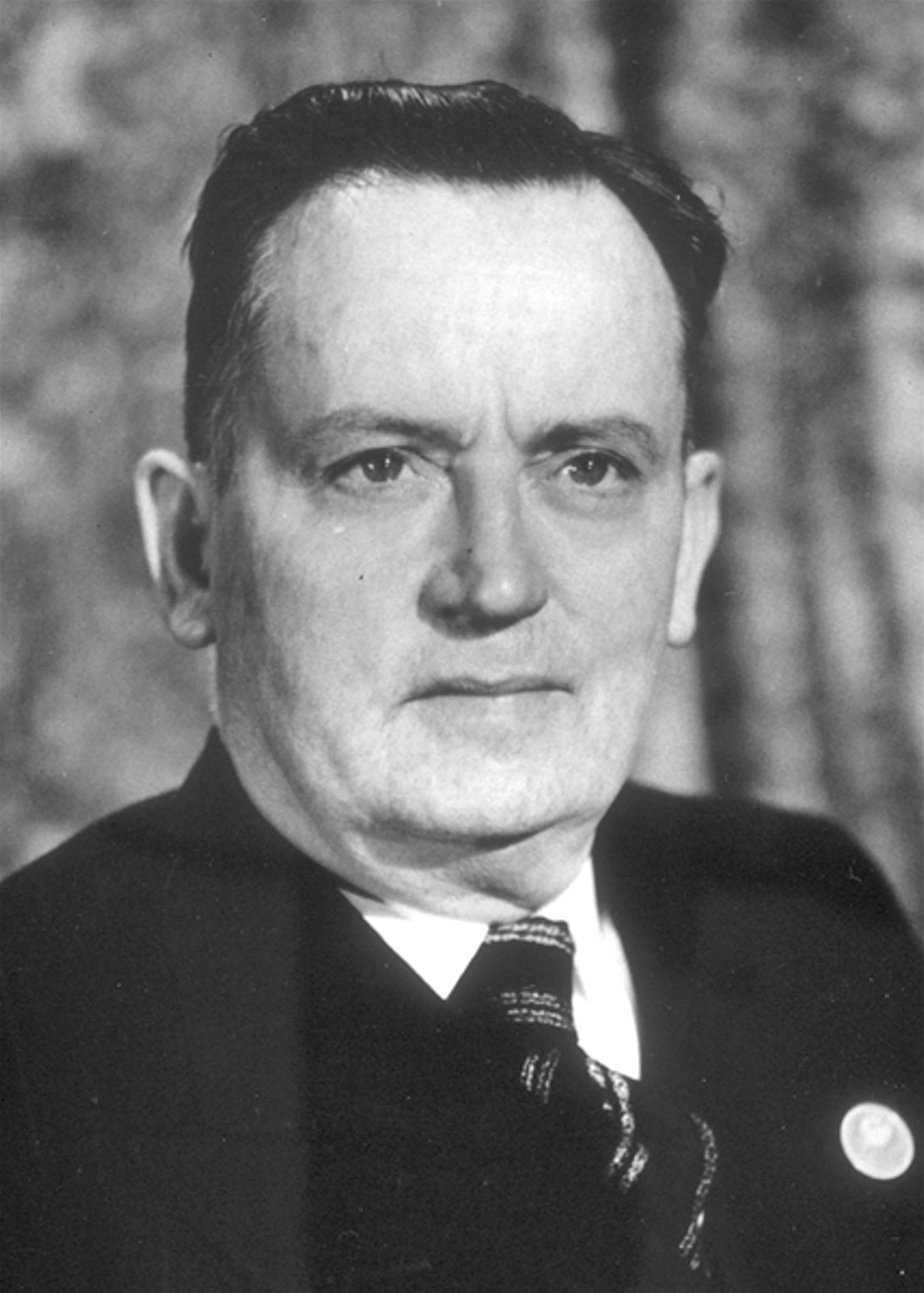
- Forde in 1945

15th Prime Minister of Australia
- In office 6 July 1945 – 13 July 1945
- Monarch: George VI
- Governor-General: Prince Henry, Duke of Gloucester
- Deputy: Himself
- Preceded by: John Curtin
- Succeeded by: Ben Chifley

Deputy Prime Minister of Australia
- De facto 7 October 1941 – 31 October 1946
- Prime Minister: John Curtin; Himself (acting); Ben Chifley
- Preceded by: Robert Menzies
- Succeeded by: H. V. Evatt

Deputy Leader of the Labor Party
- In office 16 February 1932 – 31 October 1946
- Leader: James Scullin; John Curtin; Ben Chifley
- Preceded by: Ted Theodore
- Succeeded by: H. V. Evatt

Member of the Australian Parliament for Capricornia
- In office 16 December 1922 – 28 September 1946
- Preceded by: William Higgs
- Succeeded by: Charles Davidson

Member of the Queensland Legislative Assembly
- In office 12 May 1917 – 5 October 1922
- Preceded by: John Adamson
- Succeeded by: George Farrell
- Constituency: Rockhampton
- In office 12 March 1955 – 3 August 1957
- Preceded by: Ernest Riordan
- Succeeded by: Bill Longeran
- Constituency: Flinders

Personal details
- Born: Francis Michael Forde; 18 July 1890 Mitchell, Colony of Queensland
- Died: 28 January 1983 (aged 92) Brisbane, Queensland, Australia
- Resting place: Toowong Cemetery, Queensland
- Party: Labor
- Spouse: Veronica O'Reilly (m. 1925; died 1967)
- Children: 4
- Education: St Mary's College, Toowoomba
- Occupation: Schoolteacher; telegraphist; politician

Francis Michael Forde (18 July 1890 – 28 January 1983) was the 15th prime minister of Australia from 6 to 13 July 1945, in a caretaker capacity following the death of John Curtin. He was deputy leader of the Australian Labor Party (ALP) from 1932 to 1946 and is the shortest-serving prime minister in Australia's history.

Forde was born in Mitchell, Queensland, to Irish immigrant parents. He eventually settled in Rockhampton, and was a schoolteacher and telegraphist before entering politics. Having joined the ALP at a young age, Forde was elected to the Queensland Legislative Assembly in 1917, aged 26. He transferred to the House of Representatives at the 1922 federal election, winning the Division of Capricornia. Forde was an assistant minister and minister in the Scullin government from 1929 to 1932, and was largely responsible for the government's policy of tariff increases during the Great Depression. He entered the cabinet in 1931 as Minister for Trade and Customs.

After Labor's landslide defeat at the 1931 election, Forde was elected deputy leader in place of Ted Theodore. He was expected to become party leader after Scullin's retirement in 1935 but lost to John Curtin by one vote. He returned to cabinet in 1941 as Minister for the Army in the Curtin government, and as the de facto deputy prime minister was one of the government's most prominent figures. When John Curtin died in office in 1945, Forde was appointed prime minister to serve while the Labor Party elected a new leader. He contested the leadership ballot against Ben Chifley and Norman Makin, but Chifley emerged victorious.

Forde continued on as deputy leader and army minister in the Chifley government, but lost his seat at the 1946 election. He then was High Commissioner to Canada from 1947 to 1953. Forde attempted to re-enter federal parliament in 1954, but was unsuccessful. He won a state by-election in Queensland the following year – the only former prime minister to enter state parliament – but served only a single term before again being defeated. Forde died at the age of 92, and was accorded a state funeral. At the time of his death, he was the longest-lived Australian prime minister, a record surpassed by Gough Whitlam.

== Early life ==
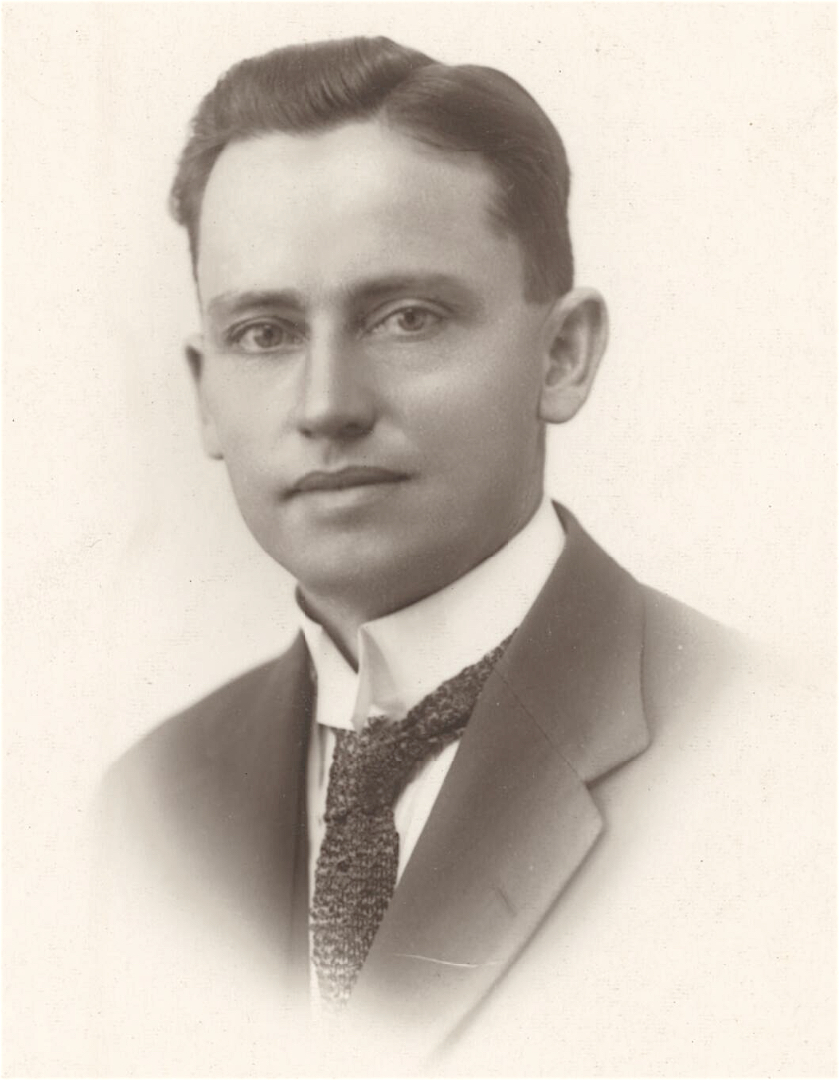
Forde as a young man

Forde was born on 18 July 1890 in Mitchell, Queensland. He was the second of six children born to Ellen (née Quirk) and John Forde. His parents were both Irish immigrants – his father was born in Ballinaglera, County Leitrim, while his mother was from County Tipperary. His father was working as a grazier at the time of his birth, and later worked as a railway supervisor.

Forde began his education at the local state school and later boarded at St Mary's College, Toowoomba. He qualified as a schoolteacher via the monitorial system, but at the age of 20 joined Queensland Railways as a clerk in the telegraphy department. He later moved to Brisbane to work as a telegraphist for the Postmaster-General's Department, at the same time studying electrical engineering. In 1914, Forde was transferred to Rockhampton. He was involved with the Australian Natives' Association (ANA), the Australian Workers' Union, and the Rockhampton Workers' Political Organisation, and helped campaign for the "No" vote in the conscription referendums of 1916 and 1917. His role as president of the Rockhampton branch of the ANA "marked the beginning of participation in community debates and public life".

== Early political involvement ==
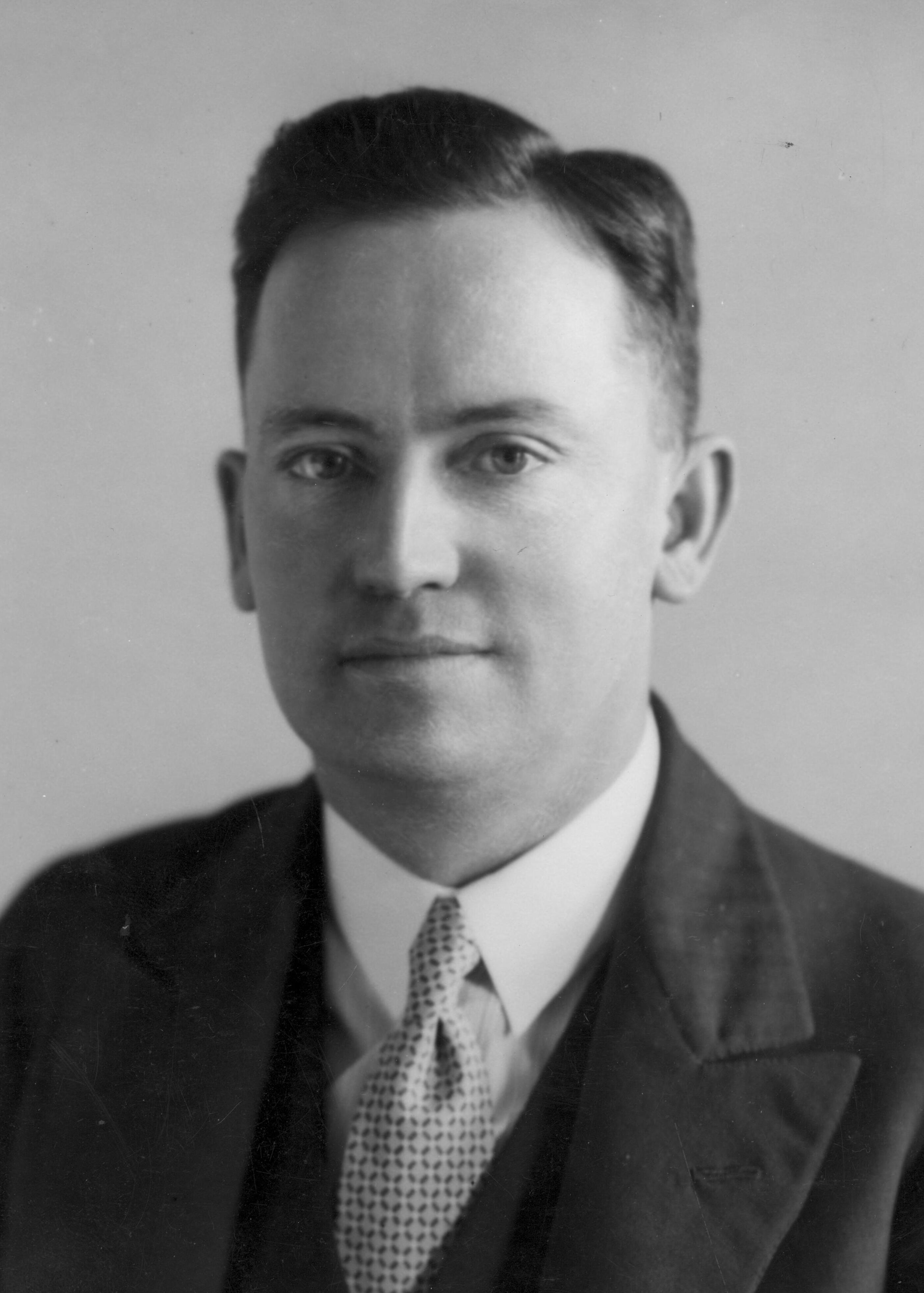
Forde early in his political career

=== State politics ===
Forde joined the Labor Party in 1915, at the urging of state MP James Larcombe, who became his mentor. In 1917, aged 26, he won a by-election to the seat of Rockhampton in the Queensland Legislative Assembly. It had been vacated by John Adamson, who had resigned from the Labor Party in the wake of the 1916 party split and unsuccessfully sought Nationalist Party preselection for the Senate. Forde was re-elected to Rockhampton at the 1918 and 1920 state elections. He was a supporter of the Central Queensland Separation Movement, one of the many new state movements active around that time.

=== Election to federal parliament ===
In 1921, the state Labor government of Ted Theodore passed controversial legislation that allowed state MPs to run for federal parliament and automatically return to their seat in state parliament if they lost, without having to face a by-election. It was widely reported that Forde was intended to be the primary beneficiary of the new legislation. However, the federal Nationalist government responded by amending the Commonwealth Electoral Act 1918 to overrule the state law. In October 1922, Forde resigned from state parliament to run in the Division of Capricornia at the 1922 federal election. He was successful, defeating Nationalist incumbent and Labor defector William Higgs. Forde's successful foray into federal politics triggered the 1923 Rockhampton by-election. The bitterly fought by-election was successfully contested by Labor's George Farrell, who had worked on Forde's federal campaign.

Forde took his seat in the House of Representatives at the age of 32, becoming one of the youngest members of the new parliament. He soon became known as a champion of the sugar and cotton industries. Despite the party's dominance in state politics, he was the only Labor MP in Queensland to be re-elected at the 1925 federal election. He remained the only Queenslander in the ALP caucus until August 1928, when John MacDonald was appointed to a casual vacancy in the Senate. In 1927, Forde was appointed as his Labor Party's representative to the Royal Commission on the Moving Picture Industry. He and the other commissioners travelled around Australia interviewing 250 witnesses. The royal commission recommended the establishment of a national film censorship board, with films able to be refused registration on morality grounds.

== Scullin government (1929–1932) ==
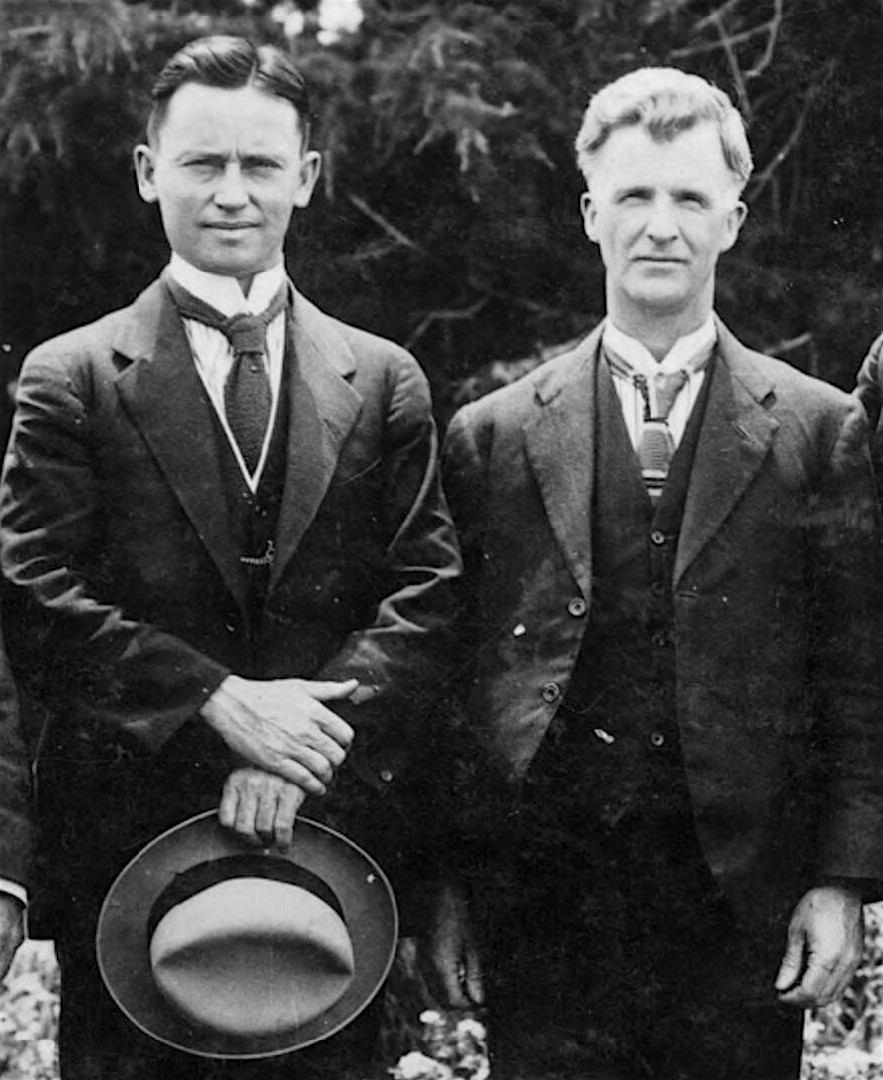
Forde and James Scullin

The Labor Party won the 1929 election, with James Scullin becoming prime minister. Forde was elected to the Scullin Ministry as an assistant minister, and was also appointed to the Committee of Public Accounts. His superior minister was James Fenton, the minister for trade and customs. Fenton was absent from the country or otherwise occupied for most of 1930, including as acting prime minister for five months while Scullin attended the 1930 Imperial Conference in London. Forde oversaw the Department of Trade and Customs in Fenton's absence, and also deputised for Parker Moloney as minister for markets and minister for transport.

Forde remained loyal to the Scullin government during the ALP split of 1931, supporting the Premiers' Plan. When Fenton and Joseph Lyons resigned from cabinet in February 1931, Forde was elected to one of the vacancies and appointed Minister for Trade and Customs. At the 1931 election, the ALP suffered a landslide and returned only 14 MPs, the lowest total in its history. However, in Forde's state of Queensland the party actually increased its representation, winning an additional two House seats and all three seats in the Senate.

=== Tariff policy ===
External videos
- Newsreel footage of Forde as Minister for Trade and Customs promoting Efftee Studios in 1931.

Forde was the "principal architect" of the Scullin government's policy of high tariffs, which aimed to reduce the effect of the Great Depression on secondary industries. He introduced what The Canberra Times called a "tariff extravaganza", and was known as a staunch protectionist. However, the government's measures had little effect on the economy. Forde was a supporter of the emerging Australian motion picture industry. Despite his reputation as a protectionist, he agreed to reduce the tariff on imported sound equipment from 60 percent to just 10 percent, after vigorous lobbying from F. W. Thring. In June 1931, he was invited to officially open Efftee Studios, Thring's production studio in Melbourne. He was "shamelessly cultivated as a good friend of Efftee, with an open invitation to look in on shooting and mingle with the stars". One of Thring's investors was Tom Holt, the father of another future Australian prime minister Harold Holt.

=== Censorship ===
As acting customs minister in 1930, Forde played a key role in the banning of Norman Lindsay's novel Redheap, the first occasion on which the federal government had banned the importation of a book by an Australian author. Unusually, Forde sought advice on the matter not only from his departmental head Ernest Hall, but also from solicitor-general Robert Garran and private barrister J. V. Gould. As a "pious Catholic", he was persuaded by Garran and Gould's advice that Redheap was "indecent and obscene [and] blasphemous as well". His decision to ban Redheap was controversial and came under attack from libertarian and anti-censorship elements within his party, particularly from Lindsay's home state of Victoria. However, at the 1930 ALP Federal Conference, attempts to censure Forde failed, and a watered down resolution was passed supporting freedom of expression but allowing for censorship of "licentious and pornographic literature". Forde later authorised the banning of Frederic Manning's The Middle Parts of Fortune, overriding departmental advice, and refused an appeal from Jean Devanny to unban her novel The Butcher Shop.

== Opposition (1932–1941) ==
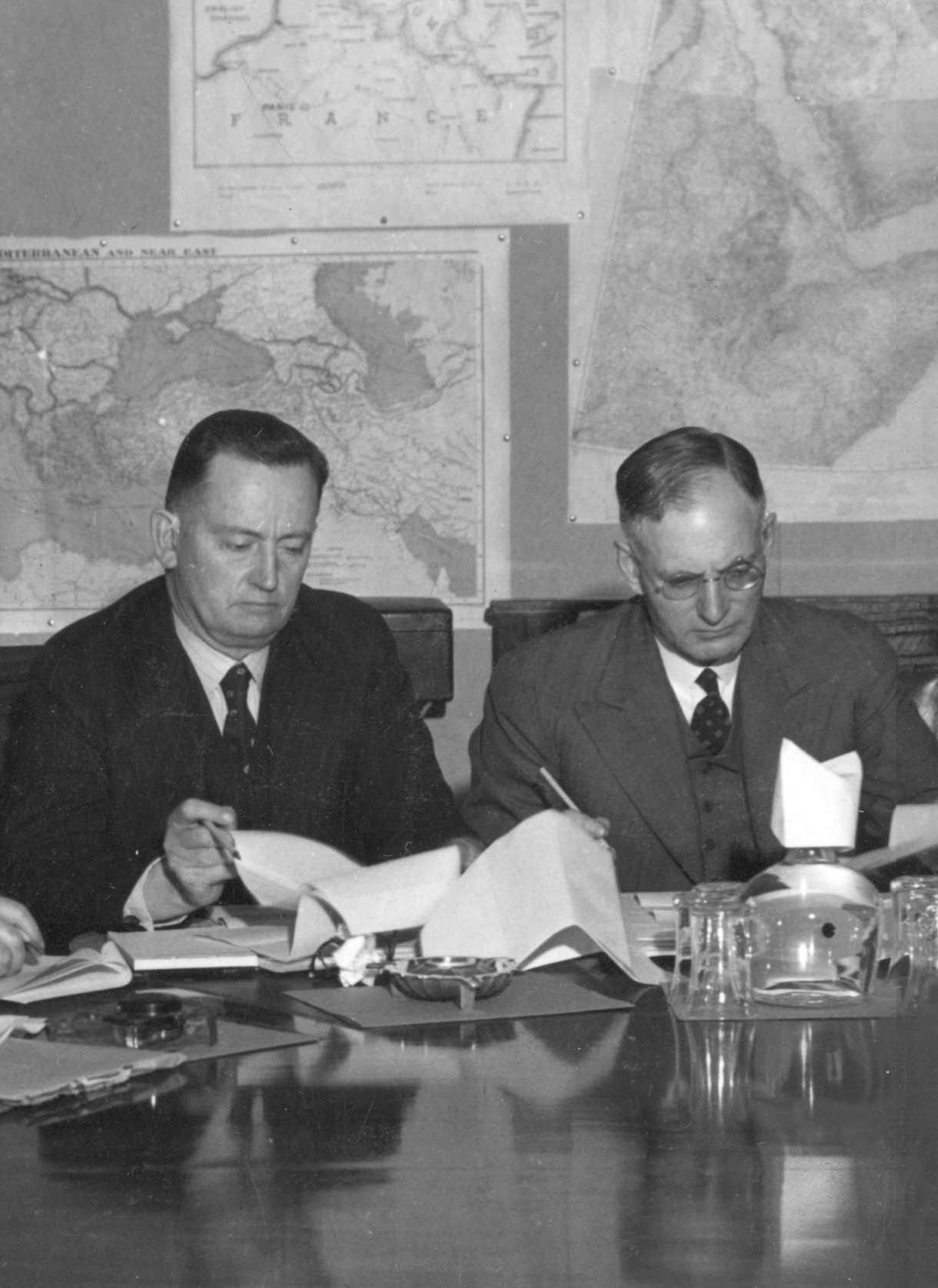
Forde and John Curtin at a meeting of the Advisory War Council in 1940

One of the MPs defeated at the 1931 election was Treasurer Ted Theodore, the ALP's deputy leader. A ballot for the party's leadership positions was held on 16 February 1932, at which Scullin was re-elected unopposed as leader and Forde was elected as his deputy. He thus became Deputy Leader of the Opposition. With Scullin suffering frequent bouts of ill health, Forde was Acting Leader of the Opposition on a number occasions. Notably, after the Italian invasion of Abyssinia in 1935 he announced that the ALP would pursue a policy of non-participation, as "the control of Abyssinia is not worth the loss of a single Australian life".

When Scullin retired in 1935, Forde contested the leadership ballot but was defeated by one vote by John Curtin, eleven votes to ten. The Age called it "one of the greatest surprises in federal political circles during recent years". It has been suggested that some MPs viewed Forde as too closely linked with the activities of the Scullin government.

In 1940, Forde was one of three Labor MPs elected to the bipartisan Advisory War Council, along with Curtin and Norman Makin.

== Government (1941–1946) ==
=== Curtin government, 1941–1945 ===
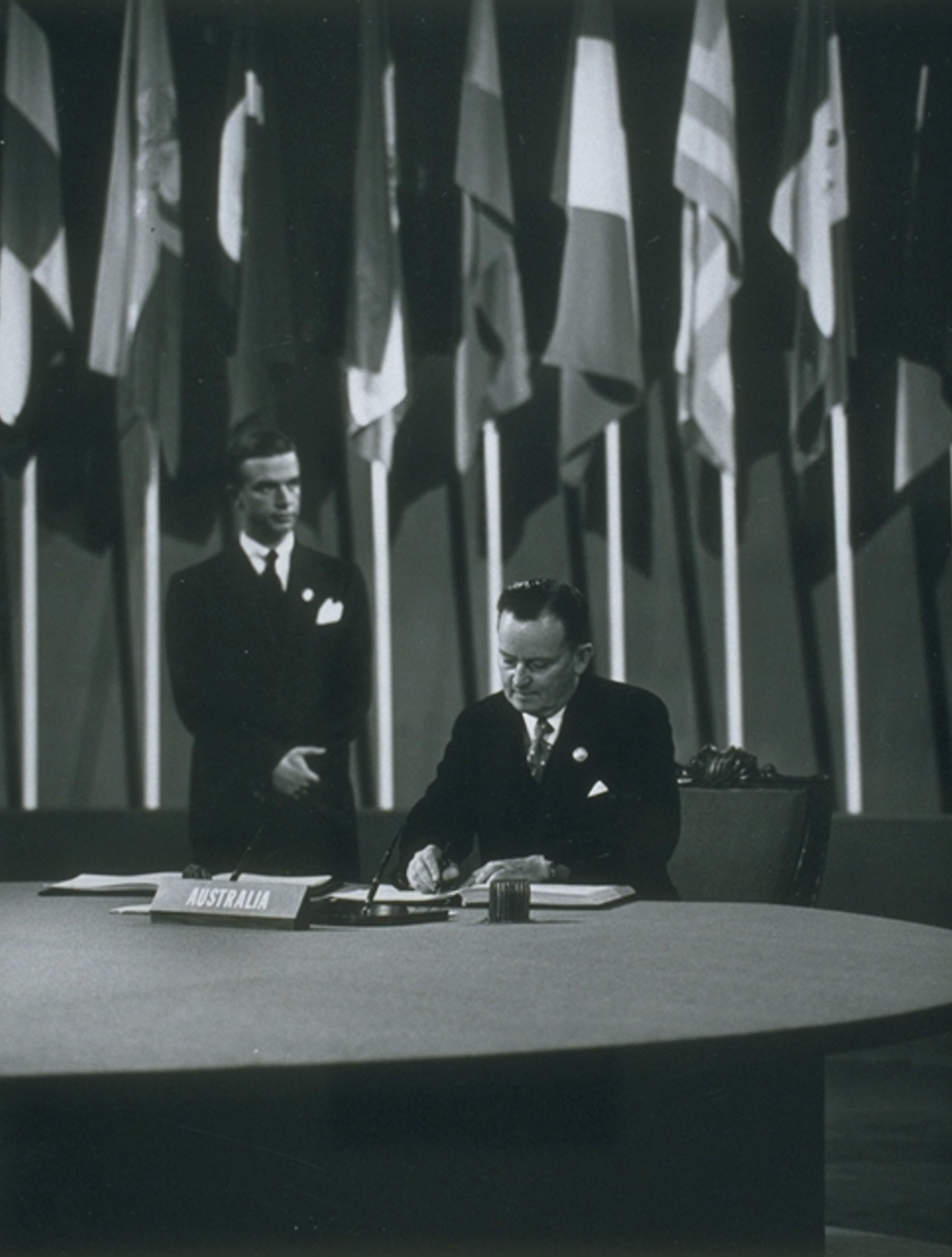
Forde signing the United Nations Charter as Australia's lead delegate to the 1945 San Francisco Conference

Forde was a loyal deputy, and in 1941 when Labor returned to power he became Minister for the Army, a vital role in wartime. He was the de facto deputy prime minister, but was disappointed not to be appointed treasurer in the new government; that position was instead awarded to Ben Chifley. Forde chaired the War Cabinet and Advisory War Council when Curtin was ill or absent, and was acting prime minister on a number of occasions. He strongly opposed the Brisbane Line proposal, which would have seen a strategic withdrawal of troops from northern Australia in the event of a Japanese invasion (and also included abandoning his own division of Capricornia to the Japanese).

As army minister, Forde held responsibility for internment of enemy aliens during World War II and administration of the prisoner-of-war camps. In February 1942, following mounting concerns over a possible Japanese invasion, he authorised a mass round-up of enemy aliens in Queensland – primarily Italians – and imposed a curfew on any enemy aliens in Queensland not interned. In the same month Forde delegated authority to the army's Northern Command to detain all enemy aliens suspected of "anti-British sentiment". His use of "master warrants" to detain enemy aliens brought him into conflict with attorney-general H. V. Evatt, a civil libertarian, who concluded some internments were "unjustified or frivolous". Forde did begin to release enemy alien internees in 1944 on the grounds they were needed for food production, although many remained in detention until the end of the war. He supported the principle that detainees could become naturalised citizens after the war's end, and also opposed suggestions that Japanese prisoners-of-war who died in Australia should not be buried in the same cemeteries as Australians.

In March 1942, Forde authorised the internment of twenty people connected with the Australia First Movement, including writer Percy Stephensen and suffragette Adela Pankhurst, announcing in parliament that the detainees intended to collaborate with the Japanese and had plans to carry out industrial sabotage and political assassinations. Only four of the Australia First detainees were charged with offences, with the others remaining detained without trial until the end of the war in spite of legal advice received by Evatt that they had not committed crimes or breached any regulations. A committee of inquiry appointed by the government concluded in 1945 that the detention of eight of the Australia First detainees was unjustified and recommended compensation payments be made.

=== Caretaker prime minister, 1945 ===
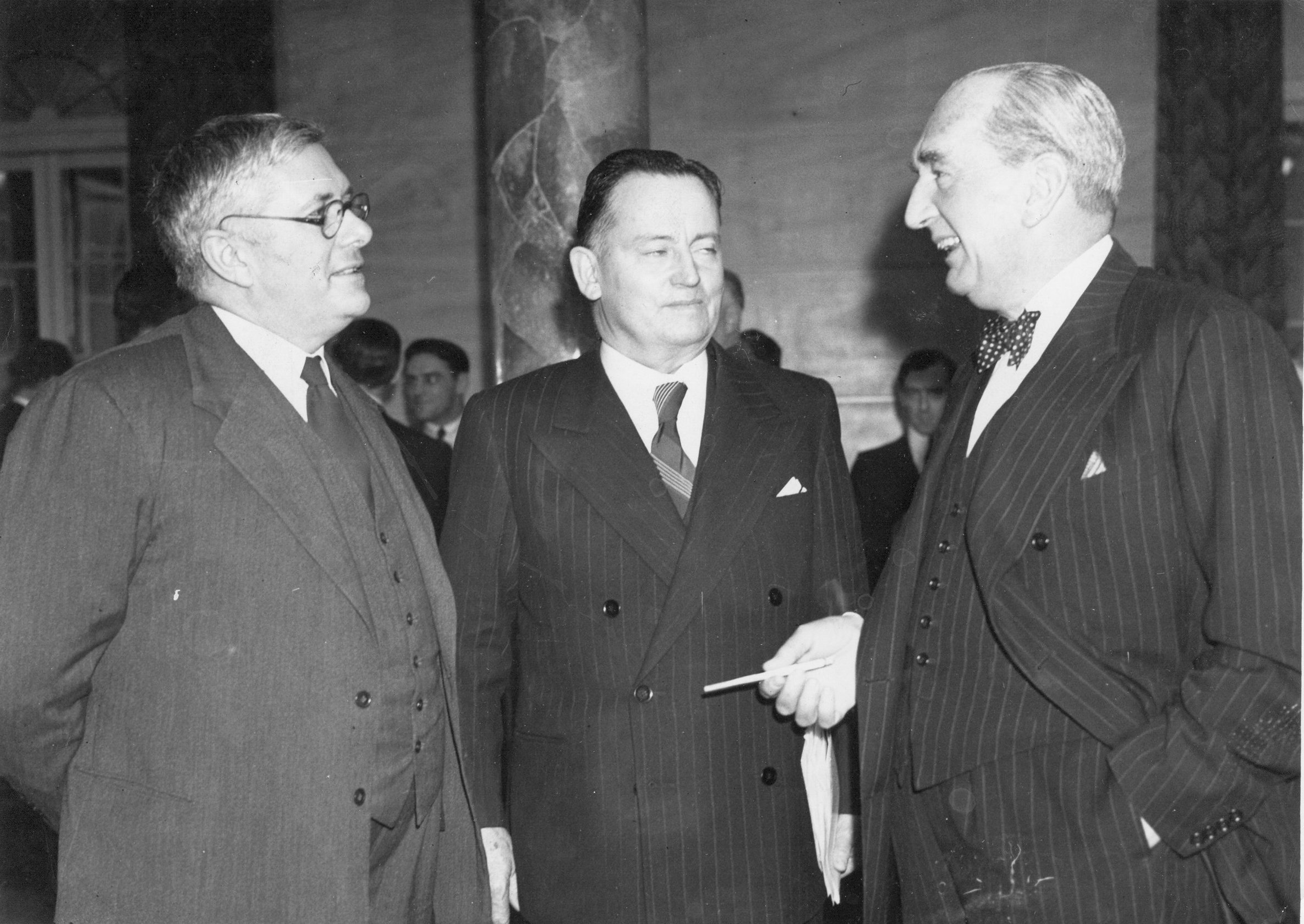
Forde in April 1945, a few months before he became prime minister, conversing with H. V. Evatt (left) and Stanley Bruce

In April 1945, Forde left Australia to attend the United Nations Conference on International Organization in San Francisco. Late that month, Curtin was admitted to hospital; in the absence of Forde and H. V. Evatt (the Minister for External Affairs), he designated Ben Chifley as acting prime minister. Forde did not return to Australia until 2 July, but then immediately took over from Chifley. The prime minister's health had severely declined in the meantime, although he had been able to go home to The Lodge. Curtin died in his sleep in the early hours of 5 July, at the age of 60.

On the day that Curtin died, Forde issued a brief statement announcing the death, and then in the afternoon moved a condolence motion at a brief sitting of parliament. On the morning of the following day, 6 July, he led a procession of MPs past Curtin's coffin at Parliament House, where his body was lying in state. In the afternoon, Forde attended a memorial service, and then went to Government House, where he was formally sworn in as prime minister by Prince Henry, Duke of Gloucester, the Governor-General. He was appointed as prime minister with the understanding that he would resign if the Labor Party elected someone other than him as leader at its next caucus meeting. Forde was the Labor Party's sixth prime minister. He is the only Australian prime minister to have never led a political party. There was little precedent for his appointment, as only one previous prime minister (Joseph Lyons) had died in office, and Lyons had been succeeded by the leader of the smaller party in his governing coalition (Earle Page).

On 8 July, Forde accompanied Elsie Curtin to Perth to attend her husband's funeral. Two days later, Ben Chifley told him that he would be contesting the leadership; that evening, they both issued statements announcing their candidacies. Norman Makin announced his intention to stand the following day. On the morning of 12 July, Les Haylen informed Forde that he did not have the numbers to win. In response, Forde said "I must say a little prayer for Ben. It's not an easy job". In the leadership ballot, Chifley received 45 votes to Forde's 16, Makin's seven, and Evatt's two. Several MPs were absent (including Evatt), and Rowley James unsuccessfully proposed that the ballot be postponed. Forde resigned as prime minister on 13 July, after one week in office. He is Australia's shortest-serving prime minister.

=== Chifley government, 1945–1946 ===
After losing the leadership contest to Chifley, Forde was re-elected unopposed as deputy leader and remained as de facto Deputy Prime Minister. He remained Minister for the Army and Minister for Defence, having assumed the latter portfolio after Curtin's death. As the Pacific War ended on 15 August, Forde's primary responsibility was to oversee the demobilisation of the Australian military. At this time service men and women were spread around the country and across the Pacific. He handled the issue in a way that was unpopular with the general public, refusing appeals to release servicemen early but also making public statements about the rate of demobilisation that turned out to be inaccurate.

At the 1946 election, Forde unexpectedly lost his seat to the Liberal candidate Charles Davidson, a returned soldier. He suffered a 10-point swing against him, compared with a nationwide 0.2-point swing against the Labor Party. As well as the concerns over demobilisation, he had been criticised for moving his family to Sydney during the war and his electorate was experiencing a severe drought.

== High Commissioner to Canada ==
In November 1946, it was announced that Forde would become the new High Commissioner to Canada, cutting short the term of Alfred Stirling. His appointment was the "first major executive act of the new Federal Cabinet" after the election. Forde and his family left Australia on 7 December, and arrived in Ottawa on 18 January 1947. In October 1951, the Menzies Government announced a nine-month extension to his initial five-year term. From May 1952, he was the doyen (longest-serving head of mission) of the diplomatic corps in Canada. He returned to Australia in July 1953.

== Return to Queensland politics (1955–1957) ==
After returning to Australia from Canada, Forde was given a civic reception at Brisbane City Hall by Lord Mayor Frank Roberts. He was soon invited to re-enter federal politics by Arthur Calwell, on behalf of the party's federal leader H. V. Evatt. In August 1953 he accepted an appointment as a paid organiser for the ALP in Queensland.

In February 1954, Forde nominated for ALP preselection for the Division of Wide Bay, following the withdrawal of the previous endorsed candidate. He was defeated at the 1954 federal election, in a seat which the Country Party had held since 1928.

In 1955, Forde returned to the Queensland Legislative Assembly as the MP for Flinders after winning the 1955 Flinders state by-election. He is the only Australian prime minister to have later served in a state parliament.

Forde held the seat at the 1956 state election, but was narrowly defeated at the 1957 Queensland state election by the Country Party's Bill Longeran by a single vote. The 1957 state election resulted in Labor losing power in Queensland after 25 years in government. Forde disputed the result and the election was declared void on 4 March 1958. However, at the by-election held on 17 May 1958, Longeran defeated Forde by over 400 votes. Had Forde been elected, he would probably have become Labor leader in Queensland, given that Premier Vince Gair and most of Gair's followers had been expelled from the party during the 1957 Labor split.

== Later life ==
In 1962, Forde was nominated for Labor preselection for the Senate vacancy caused by the death of Max Poulter. He received three out of 66 votes in the ballot; The Canberra Times noted speculation that his age was a factor in his low tally.

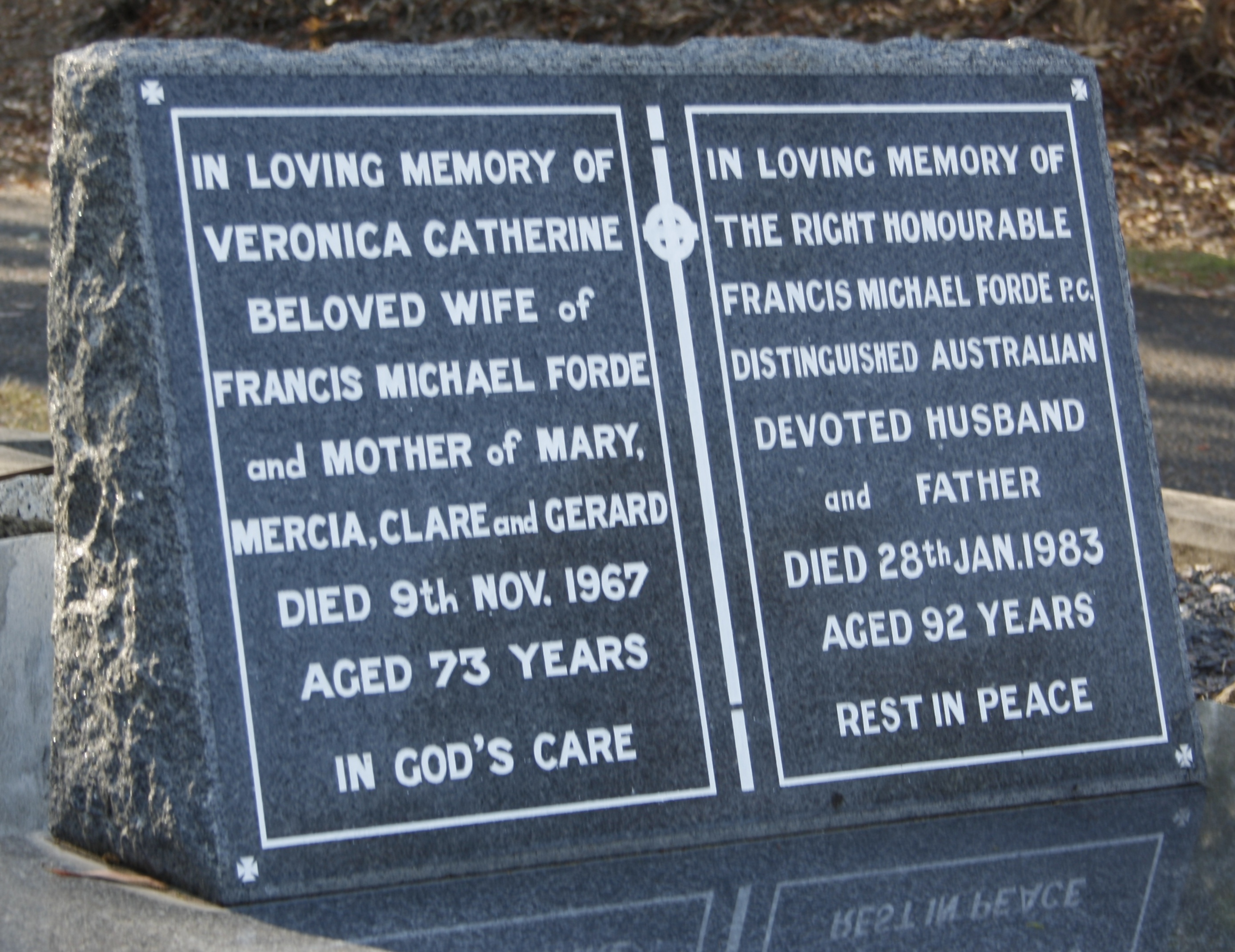
Frank Forde's headstone at Brisbane's Toowong Cemetery

Forde retired to Brisbane where he devoted himself to Catholic charity work. In his living room hung a large portrait of wartime US General Douglas MacArthur. On 11 April 1964, at the request of Prime Minister Robert Menzies, Forde represented Australia at MacArthur's funeral in Norfolk, Virginia.

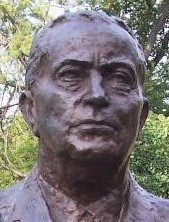
Bust of fifteenth Prime Minister of Australia Frank Forde located in the Prime Minister's Avenue in the Ballarat Botanical Gardens

Forde died in 1983. He was accorded a state funeral which, on 3 February, proceeded from St Thomas Aquinas Catholic Church in St Lucia to the Toowong Cemetery, the same day that Bob Hawke was elected ALP leader. Indeed, it was at Forde's funeral that Senator John Button told then Labor leader Bill Hayden that he must step aside in favor of Hawke, which he did. Forde was the last surviving member of the Scullin, Curtin and his own Cabinet. Furthermore, he was the last surviving MP from when Stanley Bruce was prime minister.

Forde was the only deputy Labor leader who served under three leaders (Scullin, Curtin and Chifley) until Jenny Macklin (Crean, Latham and Beazley, 2001–2006). The electoral Division of Forde and the Canberra suburb of Forde are named after him.

== Personal life ==
Forde married Veronica (Vera) Catherine O'Reilly on 1 March 1925 and they had four children:

- Mary Therese (1927–2016)
- Mercia (b. 1930)
- Clare (1932–2010)
- Francis Gerard Forde (1935–1966); his widow, Leneen Forde, became Governor of Queensland.

Forde was widowed in November 1967. During the years that he spent in Ottawa as High Commissioner to Canada two of his daughters (Mary and Mercia) married Canadians. Mary (m. William Robert Thompson) eventually settled with her husband in Kingston, Ontario, Canada while Mercia (m. Ian Ferrier) returned to Australia and settled with her husband in St. Lucia, Brisbane. Francis Gerald Forde (m. Leneen Forde) also settled in St. Lucia, while Clare (m. John Attridge) settled in Canberra. Between their four children, Frank and Vera Forde had 15 grandchildren.

== See also ==
- Forde Ministry

Parliament of Australia
Preceded by William Higgs	Member for Capricornia; 1922–1946	Succeeded by Charles Davidson
Political offices
Preceded by James Fenton	Minister for Trade and Customs; 1931–1932	Succeeded by Henry Somer Gullett
Preceded by Percy Spender	Minister for the Army; 1941–1946	Succeeded by Cyril Chambers
Preceded by John Curtin	Prime Minister of Australia; 1945	Succeeded by Ben Chifley
Preceded by John Curtin	Minister for Defence; 1945–1946	Succeeded by John Dedman
Party political offices
Preceded by Edward Theodore	Deputy Leader of the Australian Labor Party; 1932–1946	Succeeded by Herbert Evatt
Diplomatic posts
Preceded by Alfred Stirling	Australian High Commissioner to Canada; 1946–1953	Succeeded by Sir Douglas Copland
Parliament of Queensland
Preceded by John Adamson	Member for Rockhampton; 1917–1922	Succeeded by George Farrell
Preceded by Ernest Riordan	Member for Flinders; 1955–1957	Succeeded by Bill Longeran
