= Ed Gass-Donnelly =

Canadian film director, film editor, screenwriter and film producer

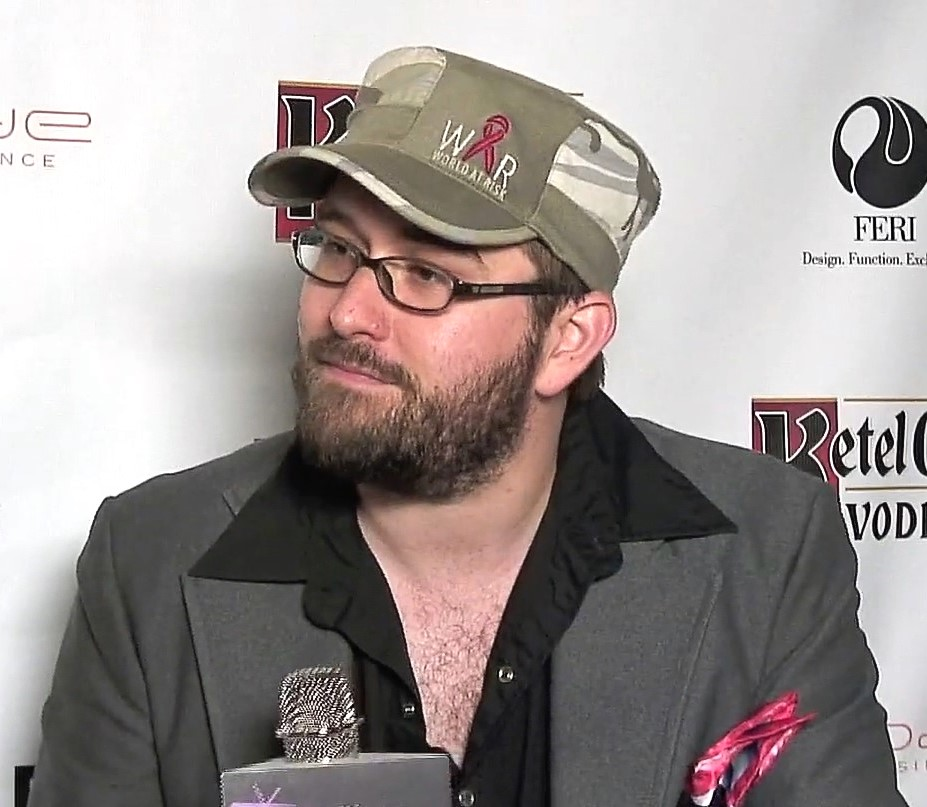
- Gass-Donnelly interviewed in 2010
- Born: Edward Gass-Donnelly; August 17, 1977 (age 48)
- Occupations: Film director, screenwriter, producer, editor
- Website: 3ldfilms.com

Ed Gass-Donnelly (born August 17, 1977) is a Canadian film director, screenwriter and producer. His first full-length film, This Beautiful City, was released in 2008 and nominated for four Genies at the 29th Genie Awards. In January 2011 Gass-Donnelly was selected as one of the top ten film makers to watch by Variety.

He is the son of noted theatre director Ken Gass, a founder of Toronto's Factory Theatre.

== Filmography ==
Director
Year	Film	Genre	Other notes
2002	Polished	Short	
2002	Dying Like Ophelia	Short	
2002	Pony	Short	
2003	Pink	Short	
2007	This Beautiful City		
2007	60 Seconds of Regret	Short	
2010	Small Town Murder Songs		
2013	The Last Exorcism Part II		
2014	The Determinist	Short	
2016	Lavender		
