= Bill Longeran =

Australian politician

The Honourable Bill Longeran

Speaker of the Queensland Legislative Assembly
- In office 2 August 1972 – 28 October 1974
- Preceded by: David Nicholson
- Succeeded by: Jim Houghton

Member of the Queensland Legislative Assembly for Flinders
- In office 3 August 1957 – 4 March 1958
- Preceded by: Frank Forde
- Succeeded by: Election declared void

Member of the Queensland Legislative Assembly for Flinders
- In office 17 May 1958 – 28 October 1974
- Preceded by: Re-elected in by-election
- Succeeded by: Bob Katter

Personal details
- Born: William Horace Longeran; 11 February 1909 Malbon, Queensland, Australia
- Died: 27 June 1981 (aged 72) Townsville, Queensland, Australia
- Party: National Party

William Horace Longeran (11 February 1909 – 27 June 1981) was a politician in Queensland, Australia. He was a Member of the Queensland Legislative Assembly.

== Early life ==
William Horace Longeran was born on 11 February 1909 at Malbon (near Cloncurry), the son of Horace Longeran and his wife, Jessie (née Grant). He had a varied career including stints as a postmaster, grazier, railway worker, miner, construction worker, hotel keeper and car dealer.

== Politics ==
Longeran won the 1957 Queensland state election (held on 3 August 1957) in Flinders as a member of the Country/National Party, defeating the sitting Labor member Frank Forde (a former Prime Minister of Australia) by one vote. Forde contested the result, arguing that some votes had been wrongly disallowed. The judge of the electoral tribunal declared the election void on 4 March 1958. Longeran was returned at a by-election held on 17 May 1958 in which Longeran defeated Forde by over 400 votes.

Longeran served as Government Whip from 1971 to 1972. On 2 August 1972, he was elected Speaker of the Queensland Legislative Assembly against the wishes of the then Premier Joh Bjelke-Petersen; Longeran is alleged to have contested the position because he believed that North Queensland was not adequately represented in the Bjelke-Petersen Ministry.

Longeran represented Flinders until 1974. On 10 October 1974 he had a heart attack while crossing Alice Street between Parliament House and the former Bellevue Hotel. He was treated at the Chermside Hospital and returned to work the following week. However, on 28 October 1974, he resigned due to his illness.

== Later life ==
Longeran died on 27 June 1981 in Townsville.
