= Electoral district of Flinders (Queensland) =

Coordinates: 20°50′33.5″S 144°11′59.6″E

Flinders Queensland—Legislative Assembly
- State: Queensland
- Dates current: 1888–1932, 1950-1992
- Namesake: Matthew Flinders

The electoral district of Flinders was an electoral district of the Legislative Assembly in the Australian state of Queensland.

It was first created in 1887, effective 1888, covering the area centred on the central Queensland towns of Cloncurry, Richmond and Hughenden. It replaced the Electoral district of Burke. Flinders, along with parts of Burke, was incorporated into the new seat of Carpentaria in the 1931 redistribution, effective in 1932. It was abolished in a redistribution in 1991, effective 1992. Most of its territory became part of Charters Towers, while the western portion, including Cloncurry, became part of Mount Isa. The last sitting member for Flinders was Bob Katter, who had held it since December 1974.

== Members for Flinders ==
Member	Party	Term
First incarnation (1888–1932)
Louis Goldring		1888–1893
Charles McDonald	Labour	1893–1901
Peter Airey	Labour	1901–1907
John May	Labor	1907–1917
John Mullan	Labor	1918–1932
Second incarnation (1950–1992)
Ernest Riordan	Labor	1950–1954
Frank Forde	Labor	1955–1957
Bill Longeran	Country	1957–1974
Bob Katter	National	1974–1992

== See also ==
- Electoral districts of Queensland
- Members of the Queensland Legislative Assembly by year
- Category:Members of the Queensland Legislative Assembly by name
