= Eric Gilliland =

American television producer, writer and actor (1962–2024)

- Born: Eric Raymond Gilliland; March 28, 1962; Glenview, Illinois, U.S.
- Died: September 1, 2024 (aged 62)
- Occupations: Television producer, writer, and actor
- Notable work: Roseanne

Eric Raymond Gilliland (March 28, 1962 – September 1, 2024) was an American television producer, writer, actor, and whistler.

== Education ==
Gilliland was born on March 28, 1962, in Glenview, Illinois. He graduated from Glenbrook South High School in Glenview in 1980 and from the School of Communication at Northwestern University in Evanston, Illinois in 1984. He died from colon cancer on September 1, 2024 at the age of 62. His childhood friend Steven Levitan, a television producer and director, wrote that he and Gilliland enjoyed watching The Dick Van Dyke Show, Monty Python, Jack Benny, Carol Burnett, and Saturday Night Live beginning when they were in eighth grade, and that they started a pun club devoted to bad puns. Levitan credits Gilliland with getting him into working in television. "(Having) a job like that would have seemed completely unattainable to me if I hadn't known someone (Gilliland) who actually pulled it off. I guess I figured that if Eric was brave enough to take a chance like that (and find a career in entertainment), I should be too."

== Credits ==
=== Television ===
Year	Show	Role	Notes
1988–89	Who's the Boss?	story editor, writer	
1990–91	The Wonder Years	writer	
1992–96	Roseanne	writer, co-producer (1992–93), supervising producer (1993–94), co-exec producer/exec producer (1995–96)	Golden Globe Award for Best Television Series – Musical or Comedy, GLAAD Media Award for Outstanding Comedy Series, Writers Guild of America Award nomination
1998	That's Life	creator	
1998–99	Welcome to New York	executive producer	
2000	That '70s Show	writer, consulting producer	
2006–09	My Boys	writer, consulting producer	
2011	Mr. Sunshine	writer, co-exec producer	
2012	Downwardly Mobile	co-creator, writer, exec producer	Unsold pilot co-starring John Goodman
2018	The Who Was? Show	writer	

=== Film ===
Year	Film	Role	Notes
1992	Samantha	actor: Hendricks	starring Martha Plimpton
1994	Teresa's Tattoo	actor: Police Officer	directed by Julie Cypher
2004	Hair High	voice actor: Spud	directed by Bill Plympton
2006	Shortbus	actor: Himself	directed by John Cameron Mitchell
2006	The Ultimate Gift	actor: Flight Attendant	starring James Garner
2006	God Grew Tired of Us	co-producer	directed by Christopher Quinn

== Music ==
Gilliland was an accomplished whistler. His whistling appeared on Sam Winch's The Lullabadeer, a number of Sumack albums, and on the soundtrack of an episode of Penn & Teller: Bullshit!. He provided whistling accompaniment to Martha Plimpton's performance of "Thunder Road" on NPR's Studio 360.
