= The Juniper Tree (fairy tale) =

German fairy tale

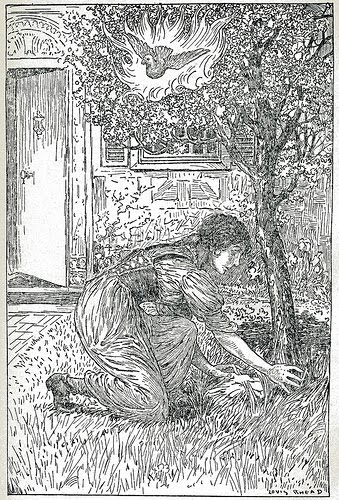
- Marlinchen mourning the loss of her half-brother while a bird emerges from the juniper tree

Folk tale
- Name: The Juniper Tree
- Aarne–Thompson grouping: ATU 720 (The Juniper Tree; formerly My Mother She Killed Me, My Father He Ate Me)
- Region: Germany
- Published in: Kinder- und Hausmärchen, by the Brothers Grimm

"The Juniper Tree" (also "The Almond Tree"; Low German: Von dem Machandelboom) is a German fairy tale published in Low German by the Brothers Grimm in Grimm's Fairy Tales in 1812 (KHM 47). The story contains themes of child abuse, murder, cannibalism and biblical symbolism and is one of the Brothers Grimm's darker and more mature fairy tales.

The tale is of Aarne–Thompson type 720 ("The Juniper Tree"). Another such tale is the English "The Rose-Tree", although it reverses the sexes from "The Juniper Tree"; "The Juniper Tree" follows the more common pattern of having the dead child be a boy.

== Origin ==
The tale was published by the Brothers Grimm in the first edition of Kinder- und Hausmärchen in 1812. A somewhat different version appeared a few months earlier Johann Gustav Büsching's Volks-Sagen, Märchen und Legenden (1812).

It was believed until the early 1870s that the Brothers Grimm re-adapted various oral recountings and fables heard from local peasants and townspeople in order to write their well-known fairy tales. However, various critics including Vanessa Joosen argue that this assumption is false, based on an overwhelming amount of disputing evidence. Literary critic Walter Scherf argued that the Grimm Brothers were inspired by the painter Philipp Otto Runge's original adaptation of "The Juniper Tree", originally written as "The Almond Tree". The Grimm Brothers themselves wrote in the appendix to the 1812 first edition of the KHM that the text was supplied by Philipp Otto Runge.

== Synopsis ==
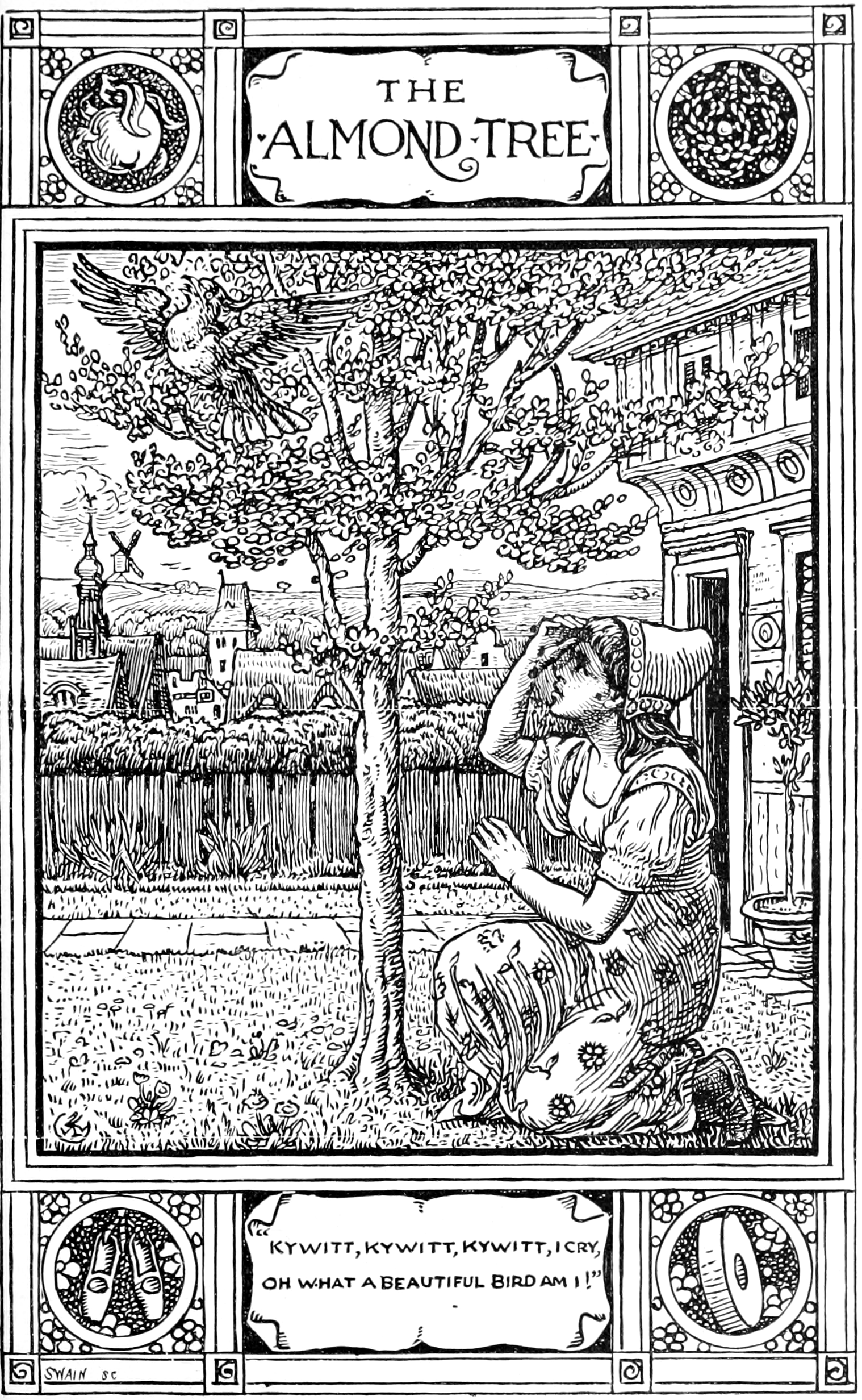
Illustration by Walter Crane, 1882

A wealthy and pious couple pray every day for God to grant them a child. One winter, under the juniper tree in the courtyard, the wife peels an apple. She cuts her finger and drops of blood fall onto the snow. This leads her to wish for a child to be as white as snow and as red as blood. Six months later, the wife becomes gravely ill from eating juniper berries and asks her husband to bury her beneath the juniper tree if she dies. A month later, she gives birth to a baby boy as white as snow and as red as blood. She dies of happiness. Keeping his promise, the husband buries her beneath the juniper tree. He eventually marries again and he and his new wife have a daughter named Marlinchen (in some versions Marlene, Marjory or Ann Marie).

The new wife loves Marlinchen but despises her stepson. She abuses him every day, claiming that she wishes Marlinchen to inherit her father's wealth instead of her stepson. One afternoon after school, the stepmother plans to lure her stepson into an empty room containing a chest of apples. Marlinchen sees the chest and asks for an apple, which the stepmother gracefully offers. However, when the boy enters the room and reaches down the chest for an apple, the stepmother slams the lid onto his neck, decapitating him. The stepmother binds his head with the rest of his body with a bandage and props his body onto a chair outside, with an apple on his lap. Marlinchen, unaware of the situation, asks her half-brother for an apple. Hearing no response, she is forced by her mother to box him in the ear, causing his head to roll onto the ground. Marlinchen profusely cries throughout the day while the stepmother dismembers the stepson's body and cooks him into a "blood-soup" (Black Puddings Sauer/Suur) for dinner. She later deceives her husband by telling him that his son stayed at the mother's great uncle's house. The husband unwittingly eats the "blood-soup" during dinner and proclaims it to be delicious. Marlinchen gathers the bones from the dinner and buries them beneath the juniper tree with a handkerchief.

Suddenly, a mist emerges from the juniper tree and a beautiful bird flies out. The bird visits the local townspeople and sings about its brutal murder at the hands of its stepmother. Captivated by its lullaby, a goldsmith, a shoemaker and a miller offer the bird a gold chain, a pair of red shoes and a millstone in return for the bird singing its song again. The bird returns home to give the gold chain to the husband while giving Marlinchen the red shoes. Meanwhile, the stepmother complains about the "raging fires within her arteries", revealed to be the real cause of her anger and hatred towards her stepson. She goes outside for relief but the bird drops the millstone onto her head, killing her instantly. Surrounded by smoke and flames, the son, revealed to be the bird, emerges and reunites with his family. They celebrate and head inside for lunch, and live happily ever after.

== Motifs ==
Several themes, among them cannibalism, death, and food, play an important role in the story.

=== Cannibalism ===
As in "Hansel and Gretel", cannibalism is a major theme. Following the death of the main character, the mother (in an attempt to cover up his death) literally "chopped him in pieces, put him into the pot, and cooked him into stew". The husband then eats the stew, saying "this food is delicious" and repeatedly asking his wife for more, "until he had finished it all."

=== Parallel between food and death ===
It is quite clear by the end of the tale that food is associated with death. At the beginning of the short story, the first wife is cutting an apple when she cuts her fingers and "blood [falls to] the snow." An apple later is even referred to as ushering in the Devil when the little boy comes home and the Devil figuratively makes the mother say to him, "My son, wilt thou have an apple?" You could even look to the son as a source of death when he is turned into stew. Finally, a millstone is used to kill the mother. A millstone is a tool typically used to grind corn.

=== Guardianship ===
Critics suggest that the character of the mother in "The Juniper Tree" is used to represent a guardian spirit. This theme of guardianship is shown throughout other Grimm fairy tales such as Cinderella, Briar Rose, and Snow White. In all of these stories, there is some object (normally represented through nature) that watches after the main character. In the case of "Briar Rose", "the briar hedge is the symbol of nature guarding her rose: the princess who sleeps inside the castle."

=== Gift giving ===
When the son becomes a bird, he requests gifts such as a gold chain from a goldsmith and a pair of shoes for his sister. In addition, he asks for a millstone from a group of millers, which he drops on the wife's head leading to her swift death. Critics argue that while the chain may represent power (to leave the wife), the shoes may also allude to freedom.

=== Song ===
Song is a symbolic motif in that it served as a vessel to expose the son's wrongful death. The bird sang this song to different townspeople in order to get gifts that he will later bestow on his sister and father after they heard the bird sing as well. This song fueled the personification of a bird, which naturally does not have the ability to communicate words to humans.

The song went like this:

My mother she killed me,
My father he ate me,
My sister, little Marlinchen,
Gathered together all my bones,
Tied them in a silken handkerchief,
Laid them beneath the juniper-tree,
Kywitt, kywitt, what a beautiful bird am I!

=== Child abuse ===
Child abuse is a prevalent theme shown through the stepmother constantly abusing her stepson and eventually murdering him. This theme, along with cruel oppression, is a recurring theme in the works of the Brothers Grimm, such as The Frog Prince and Rapunzel. Critic Jack Zipes suggests that the theme of child abuse leads to a more adult centered story. This veers away from the more popular thought that fairy tales are meant for children.

=== Personification of the Devil ===
The devil makes an appearance in many Grimms' tales, often in "various disguises". He takes many identities including anything from a "little man" to an "old goat". The stepmother's deep disgust and violent tendencies towards the stepson play right into the mindset that she may be an offshoot of the devil himself. The stepmother offering the stepson an apple before brutally killing him and manipulating her daughter's innocence to cover up the murder is also a direct allusion to the biblical temptation of Eve in the Garden of Eden. Near the end, the stepmother experiences "raging fires" within her veins, symbolising the weight of her sins and possibly the damnation of her soul. It is even described at one point during the story that the Devil (who is referred as the Evil One in most adaptions) has gone into her mind before her villainous breakdown.

=== Religion ===
Religion plays a major symbolic role in the story. Devotion to God was often associated with purity and innocence, as shown through the boy's biological parents and presumably, the boy himself and Marlinchen. The boy reincarnating into the bird and killing the stepmother with the millstone out of revenge can also symbolize the Holy Spirit, who is often depicted as a white dove, executing divine judgement upon the wicked. The story also takes place "well on two thousand years ago" placing it firmly in Biblical times. In most English language translations, the dish/cooking method that is described in the text is translated as "stew" or as in Margaret Hunt's 1884 translation as "black puddings". What is important here is that the body and the blood of the boy are cooked and consumed by the father. What is missing in most English language translations in the word "stew" is that the blood of the boy is also cooked and eaten. The symbolism in relation to the Eucharist – eating the body and drinking the blood of Christ – then become unmistakable.

=== Reincarnation ===
"In fairy tales the cycle of human life is intimately related to the cycle of nature." Particularly seen in the Grimm Brother's "The Juniper Tree", reincarnation plays a major role in the tale. The audience first sees reincarnation when the first wife asks to be buried under the juniper tree. Although the mother never truly comes back to life, her spirit appears to have supernatural influence over the juniper tree, which allows her son to be physically reincarnated, as a bird and as his original physical form, at the end of the story.

== Theory of Grimm ==
Each Grimm tale follows a predetermined and categorical format. Every tale is based on the idea that each character is born with fault. For example, if a child is "loved by his parents, he is hated by a brother or sister." Another example could include a child "surrounded by affection." Using the Grimm theory, the child then must be "pursued by an offense committed prior to his birth, generally by one of his family." It is this format that pushes a "coming of character moment" where the main character (in order to survive) "set[s] out on a road strew with pitfalls, pursued by an evil willpower, as if distance itself could not take him away from the fatality of [the character’s] family."

=== Transformative bodies in Grimm ===
Continuous throughout each of the Grimm tales are the reappearance of transformative bodies. Critic Jeana Jorgensen, argues that there is a connection between the physical transformation of characters and their genders. Drawing a connection between beauty ideals consistently being a major factor in female character development to Grimm, while transformations playing a significant role in the development of mostly male characters. She concludes that female characters are usually described with a focus on their physical attributes such as small, petite, wicked, beautiful, and ugly compared to the adjectives used in male transformations that overall relate strictly to age and size. Specifically, in "The Juniper Tree", Jorgensen uses Miriam's depiction of sorrow as a representation of the fact that in several of Grimm's tales "suffering is written on women’s bodies in a way that naturalizes their pain and almost leads us to expect women to cry in fairy tales."

=== Fantasy and magic in Grimm ===
For the Grimm Brother's audience "the fantasy and magic of the story can be interpreted as instruments to establish or restore social and economic justice." Roberta Markman believes that this is the case among all of the Grimm fairy tales because the creative process' "transformative power[s]" can change social norms. As a result, literature and other creative art forms have the power to change someone's personal attitude regarding their economic and social situations. This is especially prevalent in Grimm fairy tales where normally the character's social and economic situation is poor at best. For example, in the Grimm's Cinderella, Cinderella's social situation is contingent upon her servitude to her stepmother. As an audience member, when one reads this they are reminded of how good their social situation is in comparison.

=== Family conflict in Grimm ===
There is an apparent parallel between Grimm's "The Juniper Tree" and his previous works, familial drama. Critic Walter Scherf in a study of the introductions of children's literature, noted that out of 176 texts, 169 of them started with a basic family conflict. Similar to the plot in Juniper Tree, in Grimm's "Hansel and Gretel", the children live with their stepmother who does not like them, and makes a plan to get rid of them. She states that in the morning she and her husband will take the children into the thickest part of the forest and leave them there, with the intention that they won't be able to find their way back, and end up starving to death. In comparison to the Stepmother in "The Juniper Tree" who wanted her daughter to inherit everything from the Father, killing the Son in order to guarantee this possibility.

== Commentary ==
Listed below, in alphabetical order, are some examples of commentary written by academic scholars regarding this fairy tale. This represents their individual opinions regarding "The Juniper Tree".

=== Alfred and Mary Elizabeth David ===
In Alfred and Elizabeth David's essay, they interpret "The Juniper Tree" as "folk literature for inspiration". They believe that the nature and native culture presented in most Grimm fairy tale inspires other artists in their literary endeavors In "The Juniper Tree", this theme of nature is present. The Grimm Brothers use the juniper tree as a life source for the mother and the son. The use of nature as a life source inspired other literary work such as "Briar Rose".

=== Maria Tatar ===
Many folklorists interpret evil stepmothers as stemming from actual competition between a woman and her stepchildren for resources. In this tale, the motive is made explicit: the stepmother wants her daughter to inherit everything.

The millstone in the story would have had biblical connotations for the readers of the Grimms' days, especially as the verse Luke 17:2 says that anyone who causes a child to sin would be better off being thrown into the sea with a millstone about his neck; both refer to a millstone as a punishment for those who harm the young and innocent. Another biblical connotation could be the offering of the apple from the stepmother, possessed by the devil, to the son, which parallels the devil, disguised as a serpent, offering the forbidden fruit (traditionally an apple) to Eve.

=== J. R. R. Tolkien ===
In his essay "On Fairy-Stories", J. R. R. Tolkien cited "The Juniper Tree" as an example of the evils of censorship for children; many versions in his day omitted the stew, and Tolkien thought children should not be spared it, unless they were spared the whole fairy tale.

== Adaptations ==
Throughout the centuries, the Grimm Brothers fairy tales have been retold and adapted by an abundance of sources. The story was adapted:

- By Barbara Comyns Carr in her novel, The Juniper Tree, published by Methuen in 1985. In Comyns Carr's adaptation the stepmother is a sympathetic character and the son's death an accident. Whereas in Grimm's fairy tale it is Marlene (the daughter) who buries the bones of the son, Comyns Carr makes Marlene ignorant of the death and has the stepmother, desperate to prevent her husband from finding out and in the throes of a nervous breakdown, bury the little boy under the juniper tree. At the end of the adaptation, the stepmother does not die but is treated and begins a new life. The Juniper Tree was Barbara Comyns Carr's first novel after an 18-year hiatus in her work and was described in The Financial Times, at the time of publication, as "delicate, tough, quick-moving .... haunting".
- As The Juniper Tree, an opera in two acts by Philip Glass & Robert Moran, (1985); libretto by Arthur Yorinks.
- For BBC Radio 3 by Peter Redgrove in 1987 and directed by Brian Miller as part of a series of plays drawn from the Grimm fairy tales, with Jennifer Piercey, Deborah Makepeace, Michael McStay and Abigail Docherty.
- The short story "The Juniper Tree" (1988) by Peter Straub is about a lonely young boy who is sexually abused by an unknown man in a movie theatre.
- As the 1990 Icelandic film The Juniper Tree, based on the Grimm Brothers' tale, starring Björk as a visionary young girl whose mother has been put to death as a witch.
- Micheline Lanctôt's 2003 film Juniper Tree (Le piège d'Issoudun) juxtaposes a straight dramatization of the fairy tale with an original dramatic story exploring some of the same themes in a realistic contemporary setting.
- The story "The Crabapple Tree", by Robert Coover, appearing in the 12 January 2015, issue of The New Yorker, is based on the fairy tale.
- English folk singer Emily Portman composed a song titled "Stick Stock" based on the story, and recorded it on her album The Glamoury.
- The book The Grimm Conclusion (by Adam Gidwitz) was based on this fairy tale.
- For a collection of fairy tales created by Lore Segal and Maurice Sendak entitled The Juniper Tree.
- Lorrie Moore published a short story entitled "The Juniper Tree", dedicated to the late Nietzchka Keene, director of the film The Juniper Tree. In the story, a red-haired playwright (apparently based on Keene) appears on the night after her death to visit her friends.
- The fantasy novel Juniper and Thorn (2022) by the American writer Ava Reid was inspired by the fairy tale.
- The horror novel Juniper (2024) by Bleu Pakiser was thematically inspired by the fairy tale and contains similar motifs, including familial cannibalism and religious imagery.

== See also ==
- "Buttercup", another fairy tale where a father unknowingly eats stew made from his child's remains
- Child cannibalism
