= Like Father Like Son (2025 film) =

2025 thriller film

- Directed by: Barry Jay
- Written by: Barry Jay
- Starring: Dylan Flashner; Dermot Mulroney; Ariel Winter
- Distributed by: Lionsgate
- Release date: January 31, 2025
- Country: United States
- Language: English

Like Father Like Son is a 2025 American psychological thriller film written and directed by Barry Jay. The film stars Dylan Flashner as Eli McKinnon, a young man who becomes a serial killer after witnessing his father commit murder. It received negative reviews from critics.

== Plot ==
Set during summer 1990 in Richmond, California, Eli McKinnon (Dylan Flashner) witnesses his father Gabe (Dermot Mulroney), a school custodian, murder a homophobic bully who was attacking a student. Gabe is convicted and sentenced to death, with his execution scheduled to take place within weeks. Eli loses his job and becomes homeless while dealing with violent urges and flashbacks to the murder. His court-appointed therapist suggests that he try to understand Gabe's motives.

Eli meets Hayley (Ariel Winter), a runaway sex worker, and begins a relationship with her. After witnessing her being accosted, Eli intervenes and kills her attacker. He begins killing people he deems deserving of punishment, including a white supremacist and child molester.

== Production ==
=== Development ===
Writer and director Barry Jay, founder of the fitness chain Barry's Bootcamp, was inspired by true crime documentaries and the concept of hereditary mental illness. He stated in interviews that he was also inspired by his own experiences growing up in an abusive household. Jay described the film as "exploring whether violence is inherited" through its father-son dynamic.

=== Filming ===
Principal photography took place in Los Angeles in 2024. The production utilized Barry J. Nidorf Juvenile Hall for aerial shots symbolizing incarceration themes.

== Release ==
Lionsgate released the film simultaneously in limited theaters and on VOD platforms on January 31, 2025. The official trailer debuted on January 10, 2025.

== Critical response ==
The film holds a 7% approval rating on Rotten Tomatoes based on 15 reviews. Christy Lemire of RogerEbert.com called it "unintentionally hilarious and borderline reprehensible," particularly criticizing the plot, dialogue, characters, and editing. Sergio Pereira, in a review for Fortress of Solitude, deemed it "the worst film of 2025 so far," citing "wooden performances" and "confused messaging" about hereditary violence. Film Festival Today noted the film's compelling premise was undermined by poor execution. Common Sense Media awarded 1 out of 5 stars, criticizing its writing and describing it as the "latest waste of money from Barry's Bootcamp founder Barry Jay".
