= The Rose-Tree =

English fairy tale

The Rose-Tree is an English fairy tale collected by Joseph Jacobs in English Fairy Tales.

It is also included within A Book Of British Fairytales by Alan Garner.

It is Aarne–Thompson type 720, my mother slew me; my father ate me. Another of this type is "The Juniper Tree", where the dead child is a boy; The Rose Tree is an unusual variant of this tale in that the main character is a girl.

== Synopsis ==
A long time ago there was a man who had two children; a daughter by his first wife and a son by his second. His daughter was very beautiful, and although her brother loved her, his mother hated her.

The stepmother sent the daughter to the store to buy candles. But three times, the girl put down the candles to climb a stile, and a dog stole them. When the daughter returned, her stepmother told her to come and let her comb her hair. The stepmother claimed that she could not comb it on her knee, or with the comb, and sent the girl for a piece of wood and an axe. When she returned, the stepmother cut off her head.

She stewed her heart and liver, and her husband tasted them and said they tasted strangely. The brother did not eat but buried his sister under a rose-tree. Every day he wept under it.

One day, the rose-tree flowered, and a white bird appeared. It sang to a cobbler and received a pair of red shoes; it sang to a watchmaker and received a gold watch and chain; it sang to three millers and received a millstone. Then it flew home and rattled the millstone against the eaves. The stepmother said that it thundered, and the boy ran out, and the bird dropped the shoes at his feet. It rattled the millstone again, the stepmother said that it thundered, the father went out, and the bird dropped the watch and chain at his feet. It rattled the millstone a third time, and the stepmother went out, and the bird dropped the millstone on her head.

== See also ==
- "Buttercup", another fairy tale where a father unknowingly eats stew made from his daughter's remains
- "The Juniper Tree (fairy tale)", a fairy tale with a similar plot as The Rose-Tree.
