= Juniper Tree (film) =

2003 Canadian drama film

- French: Le Piège d'Issoudun
- Directed by: Micheline Lanctôt
- Written by: Micheline Lanctôt
- Based on: The Juniper Tree by The Brothers Grimm
- Produced by: André Gagnon
- Starring: Sylvie Drapeau; Frédérick De Grandpré
- Cinematography: Nicolas Bolduc
- Edited by: Micheline Lanctôt
- Music by: François Lanctôt
- Production company: Stopfilm
- Distributed by: Film Tonic International
- Release date: November 21, 2003
- Running time: 88 minutes
- Country: Canada
- Language: French

Juniper Tree (French: Le Piège d'Issoudun) is a Canadian drama film, directed by Micheline Lanctôt and released in 2003. Based in part on the Brothers Grimm's fairy tale The Juniper Tree, the film stars Sylvie Drapeau as Esther, a depressed woman interacting with police officer Laurier (Frédérick De Grandpré) after failing in an attempt to kill herself and her children.

Drapeau received a Prix Jutra nomination for Best Actress at the 6th Jutra Awards.
