= Buttercup (fairy tale) =

Norwegian fairy tale

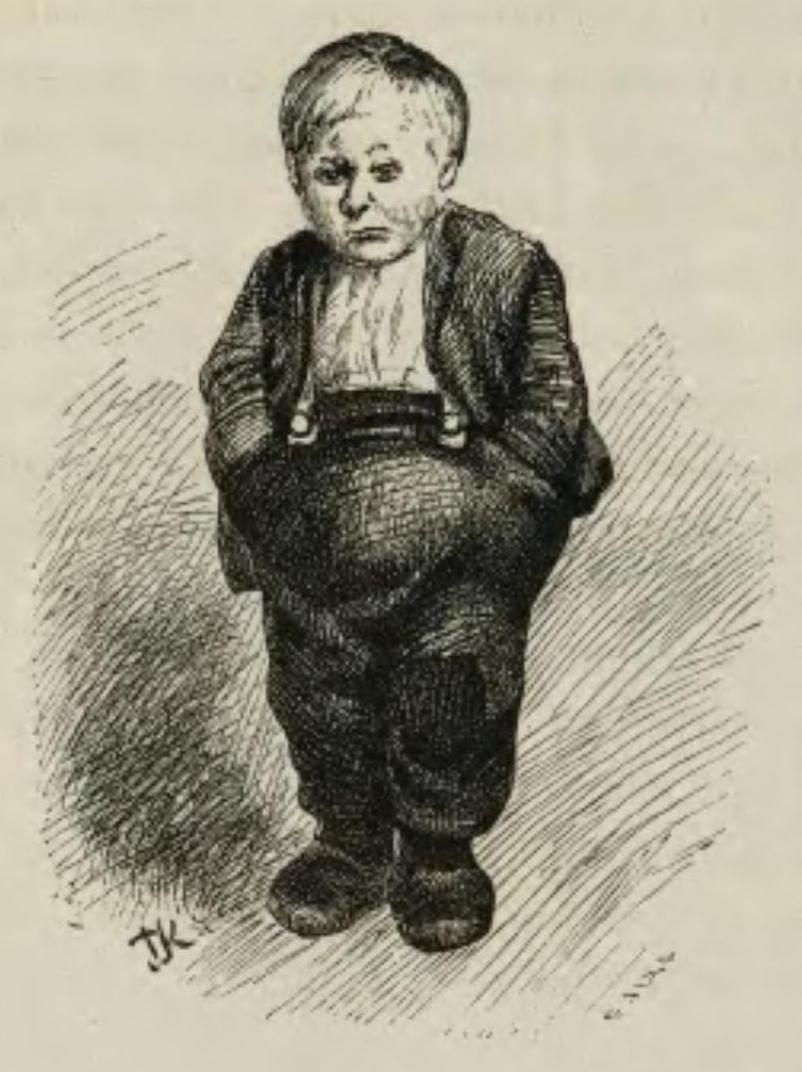
Illustration

Buttercup or Butterball (Norwegian: Smørbukk, literally "Butter-buck") is a Norwegian fairy tale collected by Asbjørnsen and Moe. It is Aarne-Thompson type 327 C, the devil (witch) carries the hero home in a sack. Buttercup is so named because he is "plump and fat, and fond of good things".

== Synopsis ==
While Buttercup's mother was baking, the dog began to bark and Buttercup saw an evil witch coming. His mother had him hide under the kneading trough, but the witch said she had a silver knife to give him and this lured him out. The witch told him that he had to climb into her sack to get it and, as soon as he was in, she carried him off. On the way, the witch asked "How far is it to Snoring?" (Note: Snoring is a fictitious location; there is no place name in Scandinavia bearing that name (or any spelling variant thereof).) and Buttercup said half a mile, so she rested and, using the knife, he escaped, putting a big fir root in the sack.

The next day, the witch lured him out again with the offer of a silver spoon, but he escaped in the same way, placing a stone in the sack. The third day, she offered him a silver fork and went straight home without resting. She gave him to her daughter to kill. The witch's daughter did not know how to do it. Buttercup told her to lay her head on the chopping block, and he would show her. He cut her head off with an axe, put it in her bed, and stewed her body. Then he climbed up the chimney with the root and stone. The witch and her husband, thinking their daughter asleep, ate the soup. Buttercup spoke to them of "daughter broth" from the chimney. They went outside to see what caused the noise, and Buttercup killed them by dropping the stone and root on their heads. He took all their gold and silver and went home.

== See also ==
- The Juniper Tree
- The Rose-Tree
- Mr Miacca
- Hop o' My Thumb
- Vasilissa the Beautiful
- Smørbukk (comic strip)
