= The River Rat =

- Theatrical release poster
- Directed by: Thomas Rickman
- Written by: Thomas Rickman
- Produced by: Michael Apted; Bob Larson
- Starring: Tommy Lee Jones; Brian Dennehy; Martha Plimpton
- Production companies: Larson/Hickman Productions; Sundance Institute
- Distributed by: Paramount Pictures
- Release date: September 21, 1984
- Running time: 93 minutes
- Country: United States
- Language: English
- Box office: $1,142,944

The River Rat is a 1984 independent Southern Gothic crime drama film written and directed by Thomas Rickman. The film stars Tommy Lee Jones and Martha Plimpton. It was filmed on location primarily in Kentucky and Louisiana, and was the first commercial film project launched and produced by the Sundance Institute.

== Plot ==
Jonsy is a teenager who meets her father Billy, who has just been released from prison, for the first time. The two slowly forge a relationship as they rebuild a boat named The River Rat. The father cannot escape his criminal past, being blackmailed by the prison psychiatrist Doc Cole, who believes he knows the location of a large amount of cash stolen before imprisonment.

Father and daughter ride The River Rat on a picturesque trip down the Mississippi River to Memphis, Tennessee in an effort to find the money and elude the prison doctor. Along the way, they learn about each other and grow closer.

== Cast ==
- Martha Plimpton as Jonsy
- Tommy Lee Jones as Billy
- Brian Dennehy as "Doc" Cole
- Shawn Smith as Wexel

== Production ==
The film was written and directed by Thomas Rickman, who was nominated for an Academy Award in 1980 for his screenplay of Coal Miner's Daughter, also starring Tommy Lee Jones. The film was produced by Bob Larson (executive producer of Coal Miner's Daughter) and Michael Apted (who directed Coal Miner's Daughter) served as executive producer. Rickman had originally envisioned The River Rat as a novel during his time in Kentucky prior to becoming a screenwriter citing the literature of Flannery O’Connor, William Faulkner, and Mark Twain as well as the Southern landscape of the Tennessee River and Mississippi River from his childhood as inspirations. Rickman wrote the initial draft of The River Rat in the 70s after graduating from the American Film Institute, but no meaningful development came of the script until the success of the Coal Miner's Daughter. The film was a Larson/Rickman Production in association with the Sundance Institute. The original music was composed by Mike Post.

== Reception ==
Audiences polled by CinemaScore gave the film an average grade of "B-" on an A+ to F scale.
