= Helene Moszkiewiez =

Jewish Belgian double agent who infiltrated Gestapo headquarters

Hélène Moszkiewiez
- Born: 20 December 1920; Nuremberg, Germany
- Died: 18 June 1998 (aged 77); Southampton, New York, U.S.
- Spouse(s): Albert (m. 1943; died 1943) Albert Colmaster
- Children: 2
- Military career
- Allegiance: Belgium
- Unit: Belgian Resistance
- Conflicts: World War II

Hélène Moszkiewiez (20 December 1920, Nuremberg – 18 June 1998) was a Jewish Belgian woman who went undercover as a secretary at Gestapo headquarters in Brussels during World War II. In her two years as a clerk, she gathered arrest and deportation lists from the Nazis for the British intelligence and Belgian Resistance, giving them the opportunity to warn or evacuate targeted people. Following the war, she moved to Vancouver, where she lived until her death.

== Early life ==
Hélène was born to Tobias and Regina Moszkiewiez in Nuremberg, Germany in 1920. In the late 1920s, she emigrated with her parents and sister Amalia to Brussels. Moszkiewiez was notorious in childhood for being unable to keep secrets. In 1937, when she was 17, she met a Belgian soldier named Francois Vermolen in a library. They were friends until he was transferred out of the city in 1939, at which point they lost touch.

== World War II ==
The Germans occupied Belgium in 1940, when Moszkiewiez was 19. She again met Francois, now in a German uniform and working as a double agent for British Intelligence under the name Franz Boehler. He convinced Moszkiewiez to join the Belgian Resistance and she agreed, later reflecting that she "did not know what [she] was getting into." Her fluency in German, French, and Flemish was invaluable to the Resistance effort. She was given a new, non-Jewish identity, Olga Richter, and posed as Francois' fiancée. Her first assignment was to sell newspapers near the German barracks in French-speaking Brussels, where she could listen in on conversations between soldiers and report back to the Resistance. She was eventually able to secure a part-time, unpaid job as a secretary at the Gestapo's headquarters, located four blocks from her parents' house. She also assisted Franz, who had risen in rank to become a Gestapo officer.

Part of her job was typing up lists of people identified for arrest or deportation. She was able to pass the information along to British Intelligence and the Resistance, who could move the targets before the raids happened. She was also given the task of placing ads in French-language newspapers promising 40 francs to anyone who turned in their Jewish neighbors. She was expected to translate the responses into German and pay the reporters accordingly. She passed this information along to the Resistance so they knew who to be wary of. In one case, she informed them of one man who had collected the money six separate times, and he was killed in his home "as a warning to others."

Her parents were taken from their home after a non-Jewish business partner reported them after Moszkiewiez's father had revealed a stash of jewelry in the cellar's coal pile to a colleague. They were imprisoned in the basement of the Gestapo headquarters before being transported to a concentration camp in 1943, where they were likely killed. Around the time of the arrests, Moszkiewiez was married to a man named Albert, who was summoned to the German headquarters just one month after their wedding. She refused to disclose the resistance work she was doing and was unable to convince him not to go; he turned himself in and later died in Auschwitz.

In September 1943, Moszkiewiez assisted with the rescue of 45 prisoners from a German jail, wherein Resistance members disguised themselves as Nazi guards under orders to transport prisoners to another location. At another time, despite not speaking any English, she housed six British airmen for five days in her small flat after they were shot down by German troops. Also in 1943, she was tasked with assassinating a Gestapo chief after he became suspicious of her and Francois' work. The man was known to make his way back home from his mistress' house every morning through a wooded area in a park. Moszkiewiez positioned herself along the trail and feigned a twisted ankle; when the man leaned down to help her, she stabbed him to death.

After Belgian liberation, Moszkiewiez learned that Francois had been using his position to secretly accumulate a large amount of wealth, including through embezzlement, and real estate. To prove his loyalty to the Gestapo, he had also turned in ten Resistance members, who were duly murdered. In 1946, the British charged him with treason and he was hung.

== Post-war ==
After the war, Moszkiewiez met and married British Intelligence officer Albert Celmaster. She declined a job offer from British Intelligence and received a Certificate of Service in 1946 in recognition of her efforts. In 1946, she and her husband moved first to the United States before settling in Vancouver. They had two sons and Moszkiewiez ran a dance studio and taught French. Her husband encouraged her to write a memoir, which she called Ma guerre dans la Gestapo. Her husband translated it from French to English and it was released by Macmillan Publishers in 1985 as Inside the Gestapo: A Young Woman's Secret War. It was published under her maiden name, Hélène Moszkiewiez, and her publisher could only contact her through a P.O. Box or an unlisted phone number to ensure her privacy. She also changed the names of the people in her book to protect their relatives. While some criticized these efforts as "excessive," the Vancouver Sun published a letter from writer Jan Drabek, who had been harassed over the phone since putting out an ad out for a documentary about his father, who was an Auschwitz survivor and a Czech Underground member. He praised her for safeguarding her life and family from the public.

In her book, she discussed at length the loneliness of working among the enemy and how she was always afraid that she would be found out and executed. She was constantly hungry and struggled with the inability to trust anyone. She also expressed horror and shame while recollecting seeing a Gestapo raid and "how meekly her fellow Jews went along with German invaders... They were like sheep waiting to be slaughtered." She was heavily criticized for these comments by the Jewish community. Author and Auschwitz survivor Bronia Sonneschein argued that Moszkiewiez had been lucky to have a "chance encounter" that allowed her to join the Resistance, while others had nothing to fight back with except "their bare hands." Sonneschein said that while Moszkiewiez's work was admirable, it did "not give her the right to call those who were killed and tortured beyond belief meek or to compare them with sheep." Historian Rudi Van Doorslaer questioned the accuracy of the memoir, citing the conveniency of her chance meetings with Franz; the improbable and sensational way in which she recounted rescue missions; and the mismatch of her book's timeline with the timeline of the war.

Little is known about Moszkiewiez's later years. She died on 18 June 1998.

== Media ==
In 1991, Moszkiewiez's memoir was made into a TV film, A Woman at War, with Martha Plimpton in the lead role. Her story also vaguely inspired Paul Verhoeven for the movie Zwartboek starring Carice Van Houten.
