= Ava Reid =

American author of young adult fiction

- Born: 1996 (age 29–30); Manhattan, New York City, United States
- Education: Barnard College
- Occupation: Novelist
- Writing career
- Language: English
- Years active: 2020–present
- Genres: Young adult fiction, adult fiction
- Notable work: A Study in Drowning

Ava Reid (born 1996) is an American novelist, best known for her New York Times bestselling young adult debut A Study in Drowning.

== Life ==
Reid was born in Manhattan, New York, and grew up in Hoboken, New Jersey.

She attended Barnard College and has a degree in political science with a focus on religion and ethnonationalism.

She has also lived in Palo Alto, as well as near Columbia, Cambridge, and Stanford universities with her partner who is an academic. Her maternal family is Ukrainian Jewish.

Reid uses she/they pronouns. She is Jewish.

== Career ==
After graduating from Barnard, Reid entered PitchWars, a pitch contest for authors without agents, eventually securing representation and selling her first novel, The Wolf and the Woodsman.

=== The Wolf and the Woodsman ===
Her debut novel, published by HarperVoyager, tells the story of a woman who is surrendered as blood sacrifice for a king, but survives the attack.

She was inspired to write the novel after reading an anecdote about Saint Stephen, the first Christian king of Hungary, who had his heir apparent nephew’s eyes stabbed because he didn't want pagans to inherit the throne. The book was also inspired by Naomi Novik, Katherine Arden, Leigh Bardugo, and Catherynne M. Valente.

It was a Summer/Fall 2021 Indies Introduce adult selection. Kirkus Reviews called it "compelling, complicated, and worthwhile," while also noting an overreliance on purple prose as well as muddled action scenes. Publishers Weekly called it a "notable debut."

=== Juniper and Thorn ===
Set in the world of The Wolf and the Woodsman, Juniper and Thorn was inspired by the Grimms' fairy tale "The Juniper Tree". Due to her family's ties to Ukraine, she set the novel in a fictional analog to Odesa, to "sweep away" cliches of Eastern Europe.

It was published in June 2021. Juniper and Thorn received a starred review from Publishers Weekly.

=== A Study in Drowning ===
Her third book, A Study in Drowning, was published by HarperTeen in 2023. It is a romantic dark academia young adult fantasy about two rivals who work together to uncover the mysterious legacy of an author.

The novel has themes of abuse and trauma, as do all of Reid's novels. She has said that she wrote with the main character Effy about experiences that reflect her own and considers the ability to discuss one's own experiences in a narrative to be the central theme of the novel. It is inspired by Welsh mythology.

It debuted at #1 on The New York Times Best Seller list on October 8, 2023. It received mixed reviews. Locus Magazine called it "intriguing, intelligent, and suspenseful" and it received starred reviews from Publishers Weekly and School Library Journal.

It was criticized by The Michigan Daily for capitalizing on "the dark academia trend" while not adding anything new and having no clear message. Kirkus Reviews called the Welsh-inspired setting "impressively atmospheric" but wrote that the mythology felt "extraneous."

=== Lady MacBeth ===
Lady MacBeth is described as a gothic feminist retelling of Shakespeare's play Macbeth centering the character of Lady Macbeth, first published by Del Rey Books on August 13, 2024.

=== Fable for the End of the World ===
Fable for the End of the World is a sapphic sci-fi dystopian novel inspired by The Ballad of Songbirds and Snakes and The Last of Us. It was published on March 4, 2025.

=== A Theory of Dreaming ===
A Theory of Dreaming is the direct sequel to A Study in Drowning, set in the aftermath of the first novel. It was published July 29, 2025. Reid described it as "more political" than the first book.

=== An Archive of Romance ===
An Archive of Romance is a novella in the A Study in Drowning series. It was first published December 9, 2025.

=== Innamorata ===
Innamorata is the first book in The House of Teeth duology and was published on March 17, 2026. It received mixed reviews, with Publishers Weekly deeming it "disappointing" and "lack[ing] direction" while The Nerd Daily characterized it as "an incredibly thoughtful read" with a focus on the darker aspects of humanity.

=== Influences ===
Reid has said that her style is inspired by Gothic fiction as well as works by Kelly Link, Carmen Maria Machado, and Helen Oyeyemi. Some of her favorite novels include Shirley Jackson’s We Have Always Lived in the Castle, the Gormenghast trilogy by Mervyn Peake, Tender Morsels by Margo Lanagan, and The Kingdom of Little Wounds by Susann Cokal.
