= The Juniper Tree (film) =

1990 film by Nietzchka Keene

- Re-release poster
- Icelandic: Einitréð
- Directed by: Nietzchka Keene
- Written by: Nietzchka Keene
- Produced by: Patrick Moyroud
- Starring: Björk Guðmundsdóttir; Bryndis Petra Bragadóttir; Guðrún Gísladóttir; Valdimar Örn Flygenring; Geirlaug Sunna Þormar
- Cinematography: Randy Sellars
- Edited by: Nietzchka Keene
- Music by: Larry Lipkis
- Distributed by: Rhino Home Video
- Release dates: 10 April 1990 (Sundance); 12 February 1993
- Running time: 78 minutes
- Country: Iceland
- Language: English

The Juniper Tree is a 1990 Icelandic medieval fantasy drama film written and directed by Nietzchka Keene. Based on the Brothers Grimm fairy tale "The Juniper Tree", the film was shot in black-and-white in a small budget in 1986. It stars Björk Guðmundsdóttir, Bryndis Petra Bragadóttir, Guðrún Gísladóttir, Valdimar Örn Flygenring and Geirlaug Sunna Þormar.

The Juniper Tree premiered at the 1991 Sundance Film Festival, where it was selected to compete for the Grand Jury Prize – Dramatic.

== Plot ==
In Iceland, two sisters, Margit and her elder sister Katla, escape their home after their mother is stoned and burned for witchcraft. They go where no one knows them and find Jóhann, a young widower who has a son called Jónas. Katla uses magical powers to seduce Jóhann and they start living together.

Margit and Jónas become friends. However, Jónas does not accept Katla as his stepmother and tries to convince his father to leave her. Katla's magic power is too strong and even though he knows he should leave her, he can't. Margit's mother appears to her in visions and Jónas' mother appears as a raven and to bring him a magical feather. Eventually, Katla kills the boy by challenging him to jump off a cliff to prove his mother will save him. Margit figures out what her sister has done but remains silent.

One day, she hears a bird sing and thinks it is Jónas returned. She tells Jóhann this and states that her sister did not mean to kill his son. Katla runs away leaving Margit to live with Johann. Eventually, Johann also leaves and Margit is left to console herself by creating folklore-type stories about birds.

== Cast ==
- Björk Guðmundsdóttir as Margit
- Bryndis Petra Bragadóttir as Katla
- Guðrún Gísladóttir as Margit and Katla's mother
- Valdimar Örn Flygenring as Jóhann
- Geirlaug Sunna Þormar as Jónas

== Production ==
=== Filming ===
Principal photography took place in 1986 in Iceland with a low budget. It was shot in black and white to highlight its dramatic content and as a resource to place the story in the Middle Ages. Some scenes were filmed at the Reynisfjara basalt columns and the Seljalandsfoss waterfall on the south coast of Iceland.

== Release ==
Due to financial problems, the film did not see distribution until 1990, when it competed for the Grand Jury Prize at the Sundance Film Festival. It was restored to 4K resolution by the Center for Film & Theatre Research, Wisconsin, premiering at the AFI Fest on 10 November 2018. It saw a limited theatrical release on 15 March 2019.

=== Critical reception ===
On the review aggregator Rotten Tomatoes, the film holds an approval rating of 100% based on 21 reviews, with an average rating of 7.80/10. On Metacritic, the film has a weighted average score of 86 out of 100, based on 6 reviews, indicating "universal acclaim".

Glenn Kenny from The New York Times praised Keene's direction and Björk's "enchanting" performance. David Ehrlich of IndieWire gave the film "B+" and wrote "A wonderful performance from a 21-year-old Björk is one of many reasons to see Nietzchka Keene's newly restored medieval fantasy."

=== Home media ===
Rhino Home Video released the film on VHS in 1995 and on DVD in 2002.
