= Mr Miacca =

English fairy tale

Folk tale
- Name: Mr Miacca
- Aarne–Thompson grouping: ATU 327 The Children and the Ogre
- Country: England
- Published in: English Fairy Tales

Mr Miacca is an English fairy tale collected by Joseph Jacobs in his English Fairy Tales.

== Synopsis ==
Tommy was sometimes bad, and when he was, he would go out into the street though his mother warned him that Mr Miacca would catch him. One day, Mr. Miacca did. He took him home to eat him, but went out to get herbs, so he would not be bitter. He asked Mrs. Miacca if they never had anything but boy-meat—never pudding. She said she loved pudding but rarely got it. Tommy said his mother was making some, and he would run and see if she would give some. Mrs. Miacca said to get some but to be back in time for dinner. Tommy ran home.

He still could not be good, and Mr. Miacca caught him again, and this time put him under the couch and watched the pot to boil himself. Then he demanded that Tommy put out a leg. He did. Mr. Miacca grabbed it and threw it in the pot, and Tommy ran off, because it had been the couch leg.

He went home and never went past the road corner again until he was old enough.

== See also ==
- Buttercup
