= Hair High =

2004 adult animated comedy-horror-romance

- Theatrical release poster
- Directed by: Bill Plympton
- Written by: Bill Plympton
- Produced by: Bill Plympton
- Starring: Ed Begley, Jr. Craig Bierko; David Carradine; Keith Carradine; Beverly D'Angelo; Hayley DuMond; Eric Gilliland; Matt Groening; Don Hertzfeldt; Peter Jason; Justin Long; Dermot Mulroney; Tom Noonan; Zak Orth; Martha Plimpton; Jay O. Sanders; Michael Showalter; Sarah Silverman
- Cinematography: John Donnelly
- Music by: Hank Bones
- Production company: Plymptoons
- Distributed by: Starz Distribution
- Release dates: March 23, 2004 (screening); April 17, 2004 (U.S.)
- Running time: 78 minutes
- Country: United States
- Language: English
- Budget: $400,000
- Box office: $127,300

Hair High is a 2004 American adult animated film by filmmaker Bill Plympton. The film is a surrealist spoof of late-1950s and early-1960s high school dramas and "teen tragedy" ballads. Featuring an ensemble voice cast including Eric Gilliland, Sarah Silverman, and Dermot Mulroney, the story follows a prom king and queen who return from the dead to attend their high school prom after being murdered by a jealous rival. It is notable for being the final feature-length film produced using traditional cel animation. A gothic high-school comedy, the film has been described as a "'Happy Days' meets 'Carrie'" story.

== Plot ==
In the 1950s, a bickering teenage couple, Wally and Buttercup, stop at a diner before their prom. To settle their argument about romance, the diner owner, Jojo, tells them the "tale of the prom, of love, of Cherri and Spud."

Cherri is the popular, spoiled head cheerleader at Echo Lake High, and her boyfriend, Rod, is the school’s aggressive football star. When Spud, a new student, inadvertently offends both of them on his first day, Rod forces Spud to become Cherri's personal servant as punishment. Though they initially despise one another, Cherri and Spud eventually fall in love.

They decide to attend the prom together in secret. On prom night, a jealous Rod discovers them and uses his car to force their vehicle off the road and into the lake. Spud and Cherri are unable to escape and drown in a final embrace. Back at the high school, Rod covers up the crime by claiming the pair eloped to Mexico. He remains the prom king, while Cherri’s friend Darlene is crowned the new queen.

One year later, on the night of the next prom, the car—and the skeletal, decomposing bodies of Cherri and Spud—magically rises from the lake. They drive to the school and enter the ballroom during the coronation ceremony. As they approach the stage, various creatures including spiders, snakes, and fish emerge from their rotting skin. The creatures attack and devour Rod and his friend Dwayne. Darlene flees in terror, allowing the undead Cherri and Spud to be crowned the rightful Prom King and Queen.

Back in the diner, Wally and Buttercup are moved by Jojo's story. Their skepticism vanishes when they hear the sound of Cherri and Spud’s car driving past. The couple reconciles with a kiss as the film ends.

== Cast ==
- Eric Gilliland as Spud
- Sarah Silverman as Cherri
- Dermot Mulroney as Rodney "Rod"
- Keith Carradine as JoJo
- Michael Showalter as Wally
- Hayley DuMond as Buttercup
- Justin Long as Dwayne
- Zak Orth as "Zip" Carlswell
- Beverly D'Angelo as Darlene
- Martha Plimpton as Miss Crumbles
- Ed Begley Jr. as Reverend Sidney Cheddar
- David Carradine as Mr. Snerd
- Matt Groening as Dill
- Don Hertzfeldt as Will

== Reception ==
On the review aggregator website Rotten Tomatoes, 75% of 20 critics' reviews are positive, with an average rating of 6.6/10. The website's consensus reads: "Hair High isn't first-tier Plympton, but like the rest of the animator's work, this is an assuredly odd tale that should resonate with fans of strange cinema." Metacritic, which uses a weighted average, assigned the film a score of 61 out of 100, based on 9 critics, indicating "generally favorable" reviews.

== Production ==
Hair High was created with a style reminiscent of old cartoons and 1950s high-school dramas. The film was almost entirely hand-drawn by Plympton himself; he noted that while he attempted to hire other animators, they could not match his specific art style. He used physical celluloid and hand drawings to achieve the "clean" look of the film. This was his final cel-animated feature, with his subsequent project Guard Dog switching to digital scanning and colors.

Releasing in 2004, Hair High is recognized as one of the last major cel-animated projects produced in the United States. The process was largely abandoned by the industry following the completion of projects like 2003's Astro Boy and series such as King of the Hill and Ed, Edd n Eddy switching to digital ink and paint.

== Release ==
The film had its U.S. theatrical premiere on April 17, 2004, and was released on DVD on July 21, 2010.

=== Home media ===
A deluxe Blu-ray featuring a 4K restoration of the original cels is scheduled for release in 2026.
