= Martha Plimpton =

American actress (born 1970)

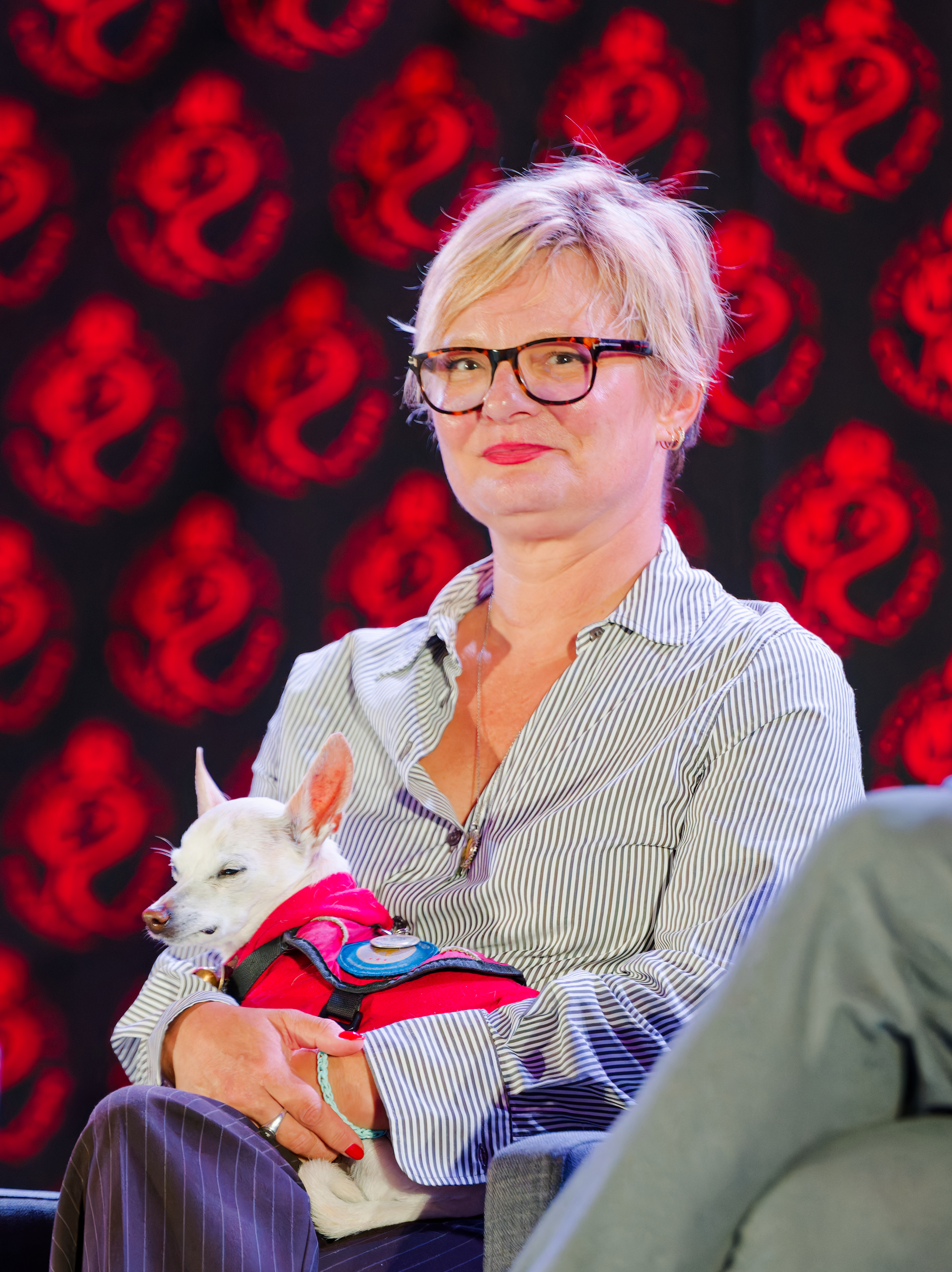
- Plimpton in 2025
- Born: November 16, 1970 (age 56); New York City, U.S.
- Occupation: Actress
- Years active: 1981–present
- Parents: Shelley Plimpton; Keith Carradine
- Family: Carradine

Martha Plimpton (born November 16, 1970) is an American actress. She started her career as a teen actress in film before transitioning to adult roles on stage and screen. She has received several awards including a Primetime Emmy Award as well as nominations for three Tony Awards. Her feature-film debut was a supporting role in the political thriller Rollover (1981), and she rose to prominence in the adventure film The Goonies (1985). She later took roles in The Mosquito Coast (1986), Shy People (1987), Running on Empty (1988), Parenthood (1989), Samantha (1991), Beautiful Girls (1996), Small Town Murder Songs (2011), Frozen 2 (2019), and Mass (2021). She is a member of the Carradine family.

On television, she took a recurring guest role on the legal drama The Good Wife (2009–2013) for which she received a Primetime Emmy Award. She was further Emmy-nominated for her leading role as Virginia Chance in the Fox sitcom Raising Hope (2010–2014), and guest spot as a drug addict in the NBC police drama Law & Order: Special Victims Unit (2002). She starred in the ABC sitcom The Real O'Neals (2016–2017).

On stage, Plimpton made her Broadway debut in the play Sixteen Wounded (2004). She was nominated for three consecutive Tony Awards for her performances in Tom Stoppard's The Coast of Utopia (2006–2007), Caryl Churchill's Top Girls (2007–2008), and the musical Pal Joey (2008–2009). She also appeared on Broadway in Shining City (2006–2007), Cymbeline (2007), and A Delicate Balance (2014).

== Early life ==
Plimpton was born in New York City and grew up in Manhattan's Upper West Side. She is the daughter of actors Keith Carradine and Shelley Plimpton. Her parents met while performing in the original Broadway run of Hair. Her paternal grandfather was actor John Carradine. Plimpton is an eighth cousin twice removed of writer and editor George Plimpton. They share the common ancestor, Captain John Plimpton (1620–1678), who was George Plimpton's seventh great-grandparent and Martha Plimpton's ninth great-grandparent. She is also related to cartoonist Bill Plympton, despite the different spelling. She attended the Professional Children's School in Manhattan. Plimpton's first stage appearance was when her mother brought her on stage in costume for the curtain call of the short-lived Broadway play The Leaf People and then another play The Ass and the Heart.

== Career ==
=== 1980–1989: Early roles and The Goonies ===
Plimpton with Tommy Lee Jones in The River Rat (1984).

Plimpton began her career as a model, securing an early 1980s campaign for Calvin Klein, making an impression as a sophisticated but tomboyish little girl. She made her feature film debut in 1981 with a small role in the film Rollover. In 1984, Plimpton appeared in the Deep South drama The River Rat opposite Tommy Lee Jones, as his "hoydenish daughter". Her breakthrough performance was as Stef Steinbrenner in the 1985 film The Goonies. Plimpton also appeared that year in the sitcom Family Ties. This began Plimpton being cast in the role of a rebellious tomboy, beginning with her performance as the Reverend Spellgood (Andre Gregory)'s daughter in the 1986 film The Mosquito Coast, starring Harrison Ford. The critically praised but commercially unsuccessful 1987 film Shy People was followed by a performance in the 1988 ensemble comedy Stars and Bars. This was released shortly before Running on Empty, an Oscar-nominated film, in which Plimpton appeared opposite River Phoenix, her boyfriend, both 17–18 years of age, like their characters. For this role, she was nominated for a Young Artist Award.

In her late teenaged years, Plimpton was also active in theater, performing in regional theater in Seattle, Washington, where her mother was living at the time. She also began a career making small independent film appearances with supporting roles in big-budget films. Plimpton appeared in the 1988 Woody Allen film Another Woman. She starred as a cancer patient in the German film Zwei Frauen (1990) (released in America as Silence Like Glass). The film was nominated for a German Film Award as Best Fiction Film. Plimpton shaved her head to play a cancer patient in Zwei Frauen. Plimpton played the independent teenage daughter of Dianne Wiest's character in Parenthood. Parenthood grossed over $126 million and received two Oscar nominations, one of her most successful movie appearances since The Goonies.

=== 1990–2008: Mature roles and Broadway debut ===
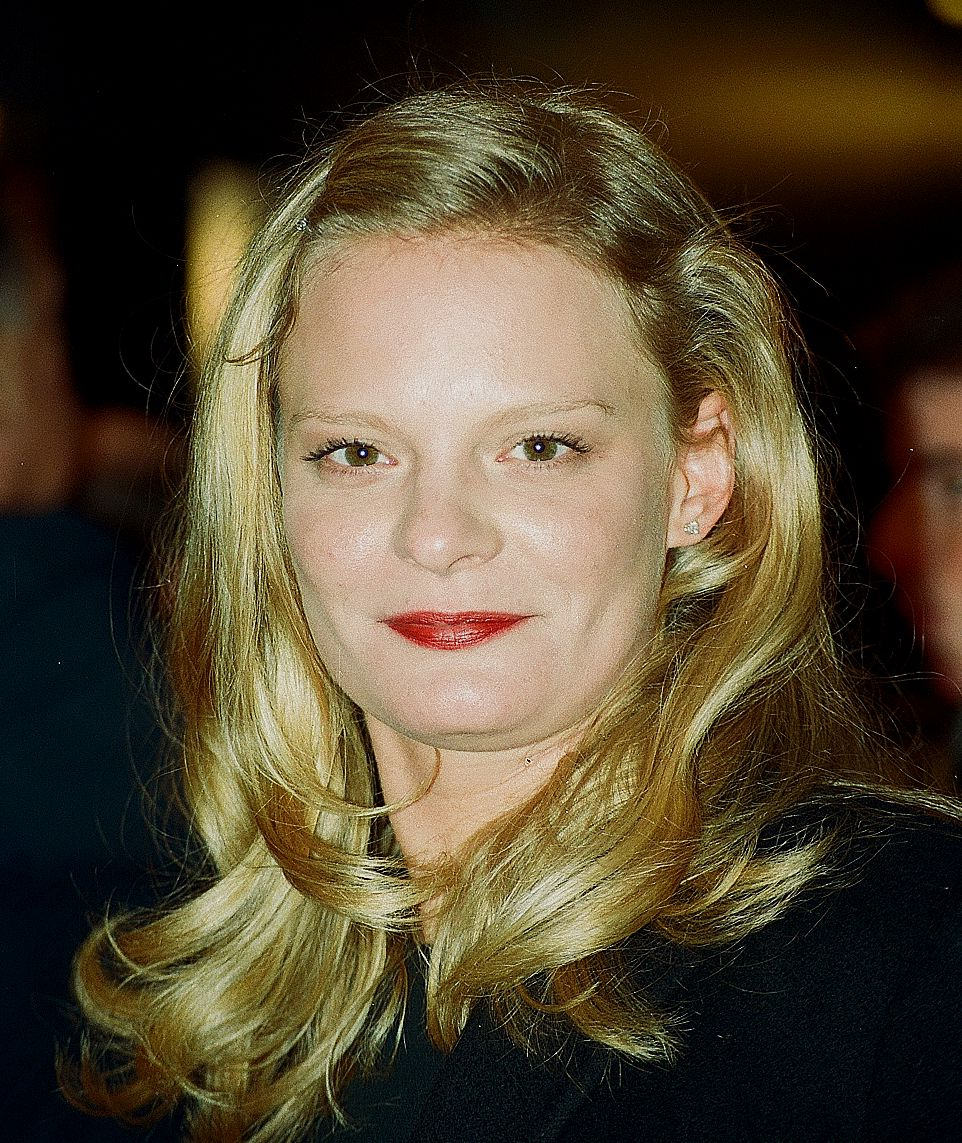
Plimpton in 1996

Plimpton appeared in the Robert De Niro-Jane Fonda 1990 romantic drama Stanley & Iris in a supporting role. She also appeared in the 1991 TV movie A Woman At War in the lead role as Helene Moszkiewiez. Plimpton played the starring role of Samantha in the film Samantha (1991). She appeared as an activist in the independent film Inside Monkey Zetterland released in 1993. Plimpton appeared in the television film Daybreak (1993, HBO). She appeared in the Showtime television film Chantilly Lace. Plimpton had a featured role in the film Josh and S.A.M. (1993) as a runaway who takes care of the two boys. She played the lead in The Beans of Egypt, Maine, based on the Carolyn Chute novel. Plimpton also appeared as herself in the independent film by Eric Schaeffer My Life's in Turnaround (1993), a movie about filmmakers trying to make a movie. She appeared as a close friend of radical feminist Valerie Solanas in the film I Shot Andy Warhol (1996).

In 1997, the Showtime Network cast Plimpton as the female lead in a television film, The Defenders: Payback. Two more episodes (The Defenders: Choice of Evils and The Defenders: Taking the First) were aired in 1998. This show was a retooling of the classic television show by the same name, and the characters were descendants of Lawrence Preston, a role reprised by actor E. G. Marshall. Plimpton played the granddaughter, M.J. Preston. The intent was to spin the program off as a series, but Marshall died in 1998. The decision was made to not continue production due to Marshall's death. Plimpton became involved with the Steppenwolf Theatre Company in Chicago, appearing in Hedda Gabler (2001) among others. She appeared in the John Waters film Pecker in 1998. The film received mixed reviews—for example, the SF Gate reviewer wrote, "...Waters' patented brand of off-color fun is watered down", but wrote that Plimpton's work was "solid". The 1999 film 200 Cigarettes received generally negative reviews, but the AllMovie reviewer wrote of Plimpton: "...woefully underappreciated Martha Plimpton gets laughs as a bundle of neuroses who grows more and more stressed out as people fail to appear for her party..." In 1999, Plimpton had a recurring role in the sixth season of the NBC medical drama ER as Meg Corwyn.

In 2001, Plimpton starred in The Sleepy Time Gal. In 2002, she appeared in the documentary Searching for Debra Winger and was nominated for a Primetime Emmy Award for her guest appearance on the television drama Law & Order: Special Victims Unit. Plimpton was the voice of Miss Crumbles in the 2004 animated film Hair High by Bill Plympton. In 2004, she guest-starred in an episode of 7th Heaven. Plimpton wrote the episode of the show entitled "Red Socks", which aired in 2005. She had a recurring role in the NBC show Surface (2005–06). From October 2006 to May 2007, Plimpton was in the stage play The Coast of Utopia, a trilogy of plays by Tom Stoppard at Lincoln Center. She won a Drama Desk Award and was nominated for a Tony Award for Featured Actress in a Play. From August to September 2007, Plimpton appeared in A Midsummer Night's Dream in the Public Theater Shakespeare in the Park production as "Helena".

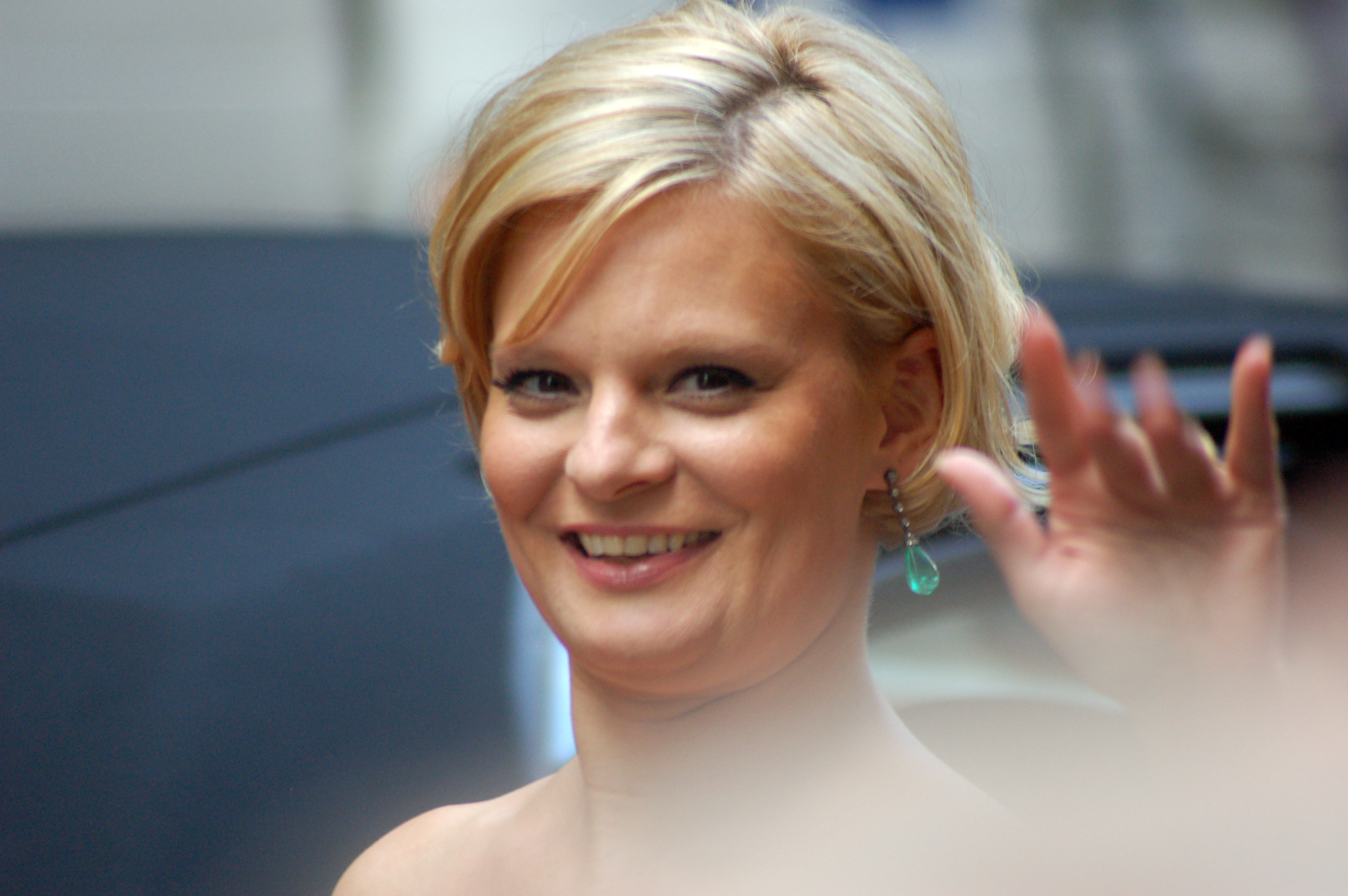
Plimpton attending the 63rd Tony Awards, 2009

Plimpton co-founded a production company, Everything is Horrible, which has produced short films for the Internet. She received her second nomination for a Tony Award in 2008, Best Performance by a Featured Actress In a Play, for her work in Top Girls at the Biltmore Theater. In November 2008, Plimpton earned a positive review from Ben Brantley in The New York Times for her role as Gladys Bumps in the Roundabout Theatre Company production of Pal Joey on Broadway: "...the ever-daring Ms. Plimpton exudes a been-there, frowzy sensuality that summons a host of hard-bitten dames from 1930s movie melodramas. Leading the nightclub act 'That Terrific Rainbow,' she has the period style down pat and a more than passable voice." Plimpton received her third consecutive Tony nomination, for Best Featured Actress in a Musical. She appeared in the 2008 Entertainment Weekly photo issue spread as one of "The Hardest Working Actors In Showbiz". Plimpton said in the write-up, "I went to jury duty the other day, and somebody said, 'You always play drug addicts!' I've played a few on TV, and I imagine because the shows get replayed, it seems like more. But yeah, people tend to see me as this pregnant teenage heroin addict." In 2008, Plimpton performed a duet with singer Lucy Wainwright Roche on Roche's EP 8 More, singing the Bruce Springsteen song "Hungry Heart". The two had performed the song in 2008 at Joe's Pub and later in 2008 at the Zipper Factory. In 2009, Plimpton was profiled by The New York Times for their "A Night Out With..." series, in which Plimpton hosted an evening of poker at The Players.

=== 2009–2019: Raising Hope and other roles ===
In 2010, Plimpton sang another Springsteen song, "Thunder Road", on the public radio program Studio 360 with Kurt Andersen, accompanied by whistler Eric Gilliland. She has appeared multiple times as a guest on public radio's The Leonard Lopate Show, and performed in a roast of Lopate celebrating the 25th anniversary of his radio program. Plimpton is on the board of directors of The Players, a New York City social club founded in 1888 by actor Edwin Booth. In November 2009, Plimpton signed on for the Fox sitcom Raising Hope. The show premiered on September 21, 2010, receiving strong reviews for Plimpton and the pilot. The New York Times called Raising Hope "the most promising of the best new fall shows", and said "Plimpton isn't the only reason Raising Hope could be the best new sitcom of the season, but she is the main reason." Plimpton was nominated for the Primetime Emmy Award for Outstanding Lead Actress in a Comedy Series for her portrayal of Virginia Chance in Raising Hope. In January 2010, Plimpton performed a one-woman show, Martha Plimpton Sings? for the Lincoln Center's American Songbook program. This show explored her experiences growing up in 1970s New York City. Her performance, well received by critics, included songs "Jolly Coppers on Parade", "Woman Is the Nigger of the World", and The Smiths's "Ask" tied together with humorous monologues. Plimpton also narrates audiobooks, including the novels Diary by Chuck Palahniuk and Mrs. Kimble by Jennifer Haigh.

Plimpton had a recurring role in the CBS legal drama The Good Wife from 2009 to 2013, playing attorney Patti Nyholm, who appeared through four seasons. Her performance earned her a Primetime Emmy Award for Outstanding Guest Actress in a Drama Series in 2012. Plimpton sang "God Bless America" during the seventh inning stretch of Game 3 of the 2010 World Series in Texas on Fox, October 30, 2010. On December 15, 2010, Chicago's Steppenwolf Theatre announced that Plimpton would be the guest of honor at their second-annual "Salute to Women in the Arts". In 2010, she starred in Ed Gass-Donnelly's independent crime thriller Small Town Murder Songs, and was given a trophy for best actress by the Whistler Film Festival. In 2014, Plimpton returned to Broadway as Julia, the daughter of Glenn Close and John Lithgow in a revival of Edward Albee's A Delicate Balance. The limited engagement ran 18 weeks at the Golden Theatre. Plimpton starred in The Real O'Neals, an ABC sitcom that premiered on March 2, 2016. In July 2019, it was revealed that she had left the Steppenwolf Theater ensemble. In September 2019, it was revealed that Plimpton would voice Yelena in Frozen 2.

=== 2020–present ===
Plimpton appeared as one of four leads in the drama film Mass, which was released in 2021 to positive reviews, and earned her nominations for the Dorian Award for Best Supporting Film Performance and the San Diego Film Critics Society Award for Best Supporting Actress. Plimpton also shared the Independent Spirit Robert Altman Award with the cast of Mass. She played a conservative mother in the HBO dramedy series Generation, which was cancelled after one season. Plimpton starred in the HBO miniseries The Regime. In 2025, she starred in Task as an FBI agent working with a task force.

== Personal life ==
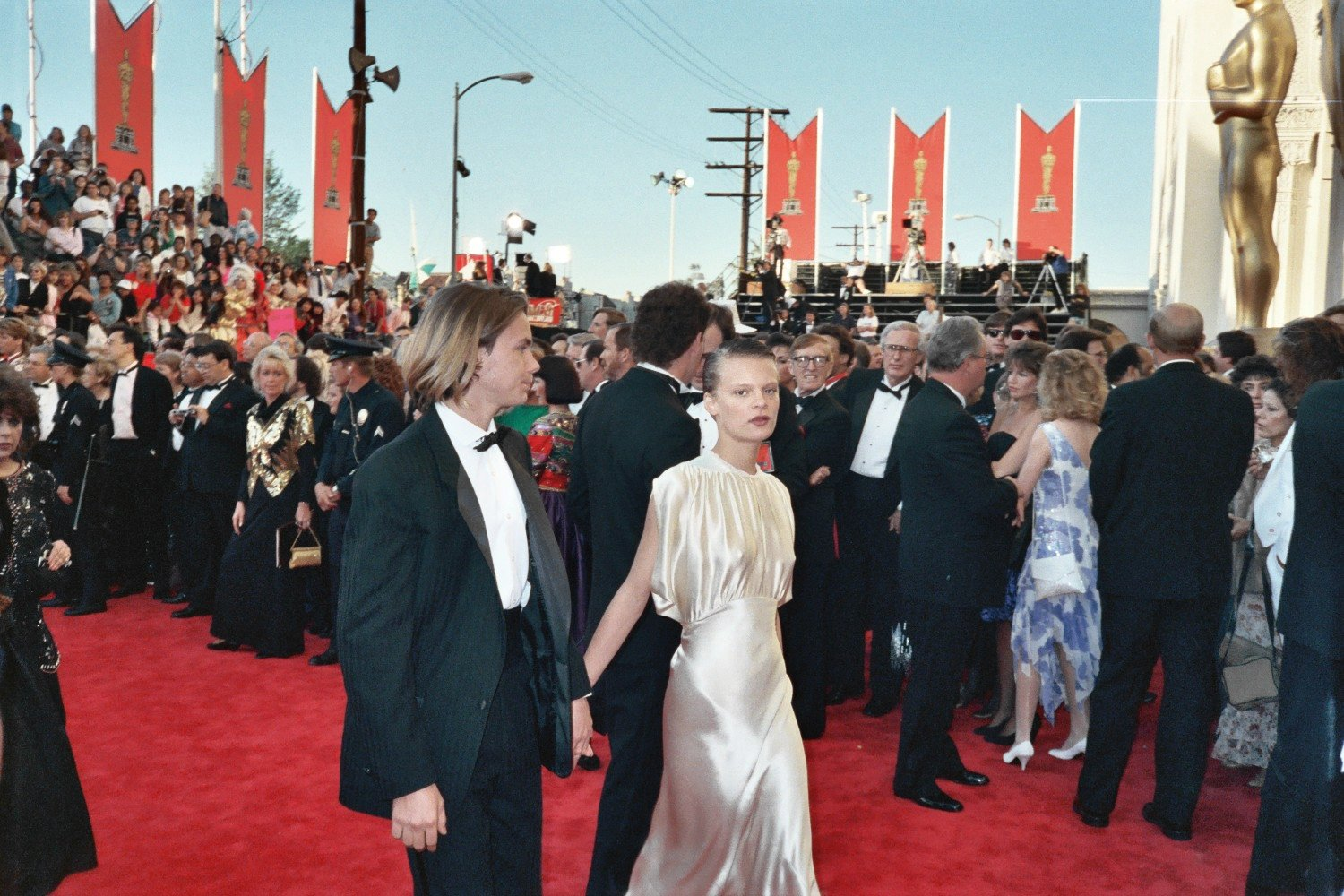
River Phoenix and Plimpton on the red carpet at the 61st Academy Awards in 1989

In 1985, Plimpton met actor River Phoenix. Initially, they did not get along well, but began a romantic relationship in February 1986 while co-starring in Peter Weir's The Mosquito Coast. They went on to co-star in the Sidney Lumet film Running on Empty. Their relationship ended in June 1989 due to Phoenix's substance abuse, but they remained close friends until his death in 1993. Plimpton later stated, "When we split up, a lot of it was that I had learned that screaming, fighting, and begging wasn't going to change him. He had to change himself, and he didn't want to yet."

Plimpton primarily resides in London. She also lived in Prospect Lefferts Gardens in Brooklyn until 2026.

== Political campaigns ==
Plimpton is an abortion-rights campaigner who has lobbied Congress on behalf of Planned Parenthood and is on the board of directors of the women's-rights organization "A Is For"; according to the organization's website, Plimpton has been politically active in abortion rights since her teenage years and speaks at campuses and rallies. In 2014, Plimpton wrote a lengthy article decrying both U.S. Supreme Court decisions in Burwell v. Hobby Lobby and McCullen v. Coakley and revealing in part that she herself has had an abortion more than once. She wrote that her purpose was "A) to contribute to the dismantling of an oppressive, artificial and unfair shaming of women who seek abortion care, B) make clear just how normal, common, and healthy a decision it is for the women who make it, and C) to encourage women who are part of this one third to be unashamed and come out of the abortion closet." In September 2017, Plimpton created controversy when she again said she had multiple abortions and said one she received at Planned Parenthood in Seattle was her "best one".

Plimpton has also advocated for LGBT rights causes. In a Twitter post in March 2016, she stated that transgender rights and abortion rights are linked.

== Acting credits ==
=== Film ===
Year	Title	Role	Notes
1981	Rollover	Miss. Fewster	
1984	The River Rat	Jonsy	
1985	The Goonies	Stephanie "Stef" Steinbrenner	
1986	A Life in the Day	—N/a	Short film
1986	The Mosquito Coast	Emily Spellgood	
1987	Shy People	Grace Sullivan	
1988	Stars and Bars	Bryant	
1988	Running on Empty	Lorna Phillips	
1988	Another Woman	Laura	
1989	Zwei Frauen	Claudia Jacoby	
1989	Parenthood	Julie Buckman-Higgins	
1990	Stanley & Iris	Kelly King	
1991	Samantha	Samantha	
1992	A Blink of Paradise	Mother	
1992	Inside Monkey Zetterland	Sofie	
1993	The Perfect Woman	—N/a	Short film
1993	Josh and S.A.M.	Alison (The Liberty Maid)	
1993	My Life's in Turnaround	Herself	
1994	The Beans of Egypt, Maine	Earlene Pomerleau	
1994	Mrs. Parker and the Vicious Circle	Jane Grant	
1995	Last Summer in the Hamptons	Chloe Garfield	
1996	I Shot Andy Warhol	Stevie	
1996	Beautiful Girls	Jan	
1996	I'm Not Rappaport	Laurie Campbell	
1997	Colin Fitz	Ann	
1997	Eye of God	Ainsley Dupree	
1998	Music from Another Room	Karen Swan	
1998	Pecker	Tina	
1999	200 Cigarettes	Monica	
2001	The Sleepy Time Gal	Rebecca	
2004	Hair High	Miss Crumbles	Voice role
2006	Marvelous	Gwen	
2007	Dante's Inferno	Celia	
2008	Gone to the Dogs	Leslie	
2008	Puppy Love	Leslie	
2010	I Thought About You	Gloria	
2010	Small Town Murder Songs	Sam	
2010	Remember Me	Helen Craig	Uncredited
2011	Company	Sarah	Filmed stage play
2017	Hello Again	Ruth (The Politician)	
2018	Honey Bee	Louise	
2019	Frozen 2	Yelena	Voice role
2021	Mass	Gail Perry	
2024	Sardinia	Judith	Short film
2025	Sovereign	Lesley Anne	
TBA	The Custom of the Country †		Filming

=== Television ===
Year	Title	Role	Notes
1985	Family Ties	Jessie Black	Episode: "You've Got a Friend"
1991	A Woman at War	Helene Moszkiewiez	Television film
1993	Chantilly Lace	Ann	Television film
1993	Daybreak	Laurie	Television film
1997	The Defenders: Payback	M.J. Preston	Television film
1998	The Defenders: Choice of Evil	M.J. Preston	Television film
1998	The Defenders: Taking the First	M.J. Preston	Television film
1999	ER	Meg Corwin	4 episodes
2002	Law & Order: Special Victims Unit	Claire Rinato	Episode: "Denial"
2003	Karen Sisco	Chelsea Wentworth	Episode: "The One That Got Away"
2003	Hack	Louise O'Connor	Episode: "Black Eye"
2004	7th Heaven	Venus	Episode: "Regret to Inform"
2006	Law & Order: Criminal Intent	Jo Gage	Episode: "Blind Spot"
2006	Surface	Mr. Big / Dr. Morris	2 episodes
2009	Medium	Rosemary Widdick	Episode: "Pain Killer"
2009	Grey's Anatomy	Pam Michaelson	2 episodes
2009–2013	The Good Wife	Patti Nyholm	5 episodes
2010	Fringe	Sheriff Ann Mathis	Episode: "Northwest Passage"
2010	How to Make It in America	Edie Weitz	6 episodes
2010–2014	Raising Hope	Virginia Chance	Main role – 88 episodes
2015–2018	Younger	Cheryl Sussman	4 episodes
2016–2017	The Real O'Neals	Eileen O'Neal	Main role – 29 episodes
2018	The Blacklist	Dr. Sharon Fulton	2 episodes
2018	The Guest Book	Shelley	Episode: "Under Cover"
2018	The Shivering Truth	Nurse	Voice role; Episode: "Ogled Inklings"
2019	At Home with Amy Sedaris	Debbie Jo Jo	Episode: "Creativity"
2019	Brockmire	Shirley	4 episodes
2019	Baroness von Sketch Show	Captain Marvelous / Margo	2 episodes
2019–2020	Vampirina	Briana	Voice role; 2 episodes
2020	Doc McStuffins	Duchess of Bedazzle	Voice role; Episode: "Bedazzled!"
2020	Flack	Clara	Episode: "Clara"
2021	Generation	Megan	Main role – 16 episodes
2022	The Man Who Fell to Earth	Officer K. Faraday	Episode: "Hallo, Spaceboy"
2022	Sprung	Barb	Main role – 9 episodes
2023	A Town Called Malice	Mint Ma Lord	Main role – 8 episodes
2023	Family Guy	Stephanie	Voice role, episode: "From Russia with Love"
2024	The Regime	Judith Holt	4 episodes
2025	Prime Target	Jane Torres	Miniseries
2025	Task	Kathleen McGinty	6 episodes
2026	East of Eden	Faye	Miniseries; 2 episodes
2026	The Lowdown	Sheriff Vela Thorne	Season 2

=== Theatre ===
Year	Title	Role	Notes	Ref.
1980	The Haggadah		The Public Theater	
1988	The Heidi Chronicles	Denise / Clara / Becky	Seattle Repertory Theatre	
1991	Pericles, Prince of Tyre	Daughter of Antiochus / Marina	The Public Theater	
1994	SubUrbia	Sooze	Mitzi E. Newhouse Theater	
1996	The Libertine	Elizabeth Barry	Steppenwolf Theatre Company	
1996	Uncle Vanya	Sonya	Seattle Repertory Theatre	
1998	The Playboy of the Western World	Pegeen Mike	Steppenwolf Theatre Company	
1998	The Glass Menagerie	Laura	Steppenwolf Theatre Company	
2001	Hedda Gabler	Hedda Gabler	Steppenwolf Theatre Company	
2001	Absolution		Steppenwolf Theatre Company (as director)	
2002	Hobson's Choice	Maggie Hobson	Linda Gross Theater	
2002	Boston Marriage	Claire	The Public Theater	
2003	Flesh and Blood	Zoe / Jamal's Daughter	New York Theatre Workshop	
2004	Sixteen Wounded	Nora	Walter Kerr Theatre, Broadway	
2005	The False Servant	Chevalier	Classic Stage Company	
2006	Shining City	Neasa	Biltmore Theater, Broadway	
2006–2007	The Coast of Utopia	Varenka Bakunin / Natasha Tuchkova Ogareva	Vivian Beaumont Theater, Broadway	
2007	A Midsummer Night's Dream	Helena	The Public Theater	
2007–2008	Cymbeline	Imogen	Vivian Beaumont Theater, Broadway	
2008	Top Girls	Pope Joan / Angie	Biltmore Theater, Broadway	
2008–2009	Pal Joey	Gladys Bumps	Studio 54, Broadway	
2011	Company	Sarah	New York Philharmonic	
2014	Other Desert Cities	Brooke Wyeth	Old Vic Theatre, West End	
2014–2015	A Delicate Balance	Julia	John Golden Theatre, Broadway	
2018	Sweat	Tracey	Donmar Warehouse, West End	
2019	Shakespeare Within the Abbey		Royal Shakespeare Company	
2022	As You Like It	Jaques	@sohoplace	
2025	Here We Are	Claudia Bursik-Zimmer	Lyttelton Theatre	

=== Video games ===
Year	Title	Role	Notes
2015	Minecraft: Story Mode	Olivia	

== Awards and nominations ==
Award	Year	Category	Nominated work	Result	Ref.
Youth in Film Awards	1984	Exceptional Performance By a Young Actress - Motion Picture	The Goonies	Nominated	
Youth in Film Awards	1986	Best Young Female Superstar in Motion Pictures	The Mosquito Coast	Nominated	
Independent Spirit Awards	1987	Best Supporting Female	Shy People	Nominated	
Youth in Film Awards	1987	Best Young Actress in a Motion Picture: Drama	Running on Empty	Nominated	
Obie Award	2001	Outstanding Performance	Hobson's Choice	Won	
Primetime Emmy Awards	2002	Outstanding Guest Actress in a Drama Series	Law & Order: Special Victims Unit (for "Denial")	Nominated	
Tony Awards	2007	Best Featured Actress in a Play	The Coast of Utopia	Nominated	
Drama Desk Award	2007	Outstanding Featured Actress in a Play	The Coast of Utopia	Won	
Outer Critics Circle Award	2007	Outstanding Featured Actress in a Play	The Coast of Utopia	Won	
Tony Awards	2008	Best Featured Actress in a Play	Top Girls	Nominated	
Outer Critics Circle Award	2009	Outstanding Featured Actress in a Musical	Pal Joey	Nominated	
Tony Awards	2009	Best Featured Actress in a Musical	Pal Joey	Nominated	
Drama Desk Award	2009	Outstanding Featured Actress in a Musical	Pal Joey	Nominated	
Critics' Choice Television Awards	2011	Best Actress in a Comedy Series	Raising Hope	Nominated	
Primetime Emmy Awards	2011	Outstanding Lead Actress in a Comedy Series	Raising Hope	Nominated	
Satellite Awards	2011	Best Actress – Television Series Musical or Comedy	Raising Hope	Won	
Critics' Choice Television Awards	2012	Best Actress in a Comedy Series	Raising Hope	Nominated	
Primetime Emmy Awards	2012	Outstanding Guest Actress in a Drama Series	The Good Wife	Won	
Critics' Choice Television Awards	2013	Best Guest Performer in a Drama Series	The Good Wife	Nominated	
Dorian Awards	2022	Best Supporting Film Performance	Mass	Nominated	
Independent Spirit Awards	2022	Robert Altman Award	Mass	Won	
San Diego Film Critics Society	2022	Best Supporting Actress	Mass	Nominated	
