= Heroine of Hell =

1996 film

Heroine of Hell is a 1996 film by Nietzchka Keene. It has a narrative combining medieval iconography with a present-day storyline and stars Catherine Keener and Dermot Mulroney. It was filmed on location in Miami and completed in 1995. It was distributed via PBS to member stations in 1996.
