= Nietzchka Keene =

American filmmaker

- Born: June 26, 1952; Boston, Massachusetts, United States
- Died: October 20, 2004 (aged 52); Madison, Wisconsin, United States
- Occupations: Filmmaker; Screenwriter; Editor; Professor
- Years active: 1978-2004

Nietzchka Keene (June 26, 1952 – October 20, 2004) was an American film director and writer best known for The Juniper Tree, a feature film shot in Iceland starring the Icelandic singer Björk in her first film role. She was diagnosed with pancreatic cancer in the spring of 2004 and died, aged 52, on October 20, 2004. She taught film making and editing at the University of Wisconsin–Madison until her death.

== Life and career ==
She was born in 1952 and raised near Boston, Massachusetts. She received her BA in 1975 in Germanic linguistics at the University of Massachusetts Amherst, and her Master of Fine Arts in film production from the University of California at Los Angeles in 1979. While at UCLA she served as a research assistant in Old Icelandic language and linguistics under Dr. Jesse Byock.

Keene worked in various capacities in the film industry in Los Angeles while attending graduate school, including positions as a recordist for a sound studio, a dialogue editor in a post-production house, a projectionist, and a re-recording mixer at UCLA. She produced three short films as a graduate student – Friends (1977), Still (1978) and Hinterland (1983). In 1986 after returning from her Fulbright year she wrote the script for The Juniper Tree and returned to shoot the film in 1987 on location in Iceland. It was the first film to star the well-known singer and actress Björk, in the role of a young child in a story based on a fairy tale from the Brothers Grimm. She won a Verna Fields Memorial Scholarship from UCLA in 1987 for editing The Juniper Tree, completing it in 1989. It has been screened in more than 23 festivals and invitational events around the world, including the Sundance Film Festival, the Harvard Film Archive, and the Art Institute of Chicago. It won the Prix du Public at the Festival des Films des Femmes de Montreal in 1990 and the First Prize for First Film at the Troia International Film Festival in Troia, Portugal in 1991.

She produced a short film, Aves, in 1994, with grants from the National Endowment for the Arts and from the University of Miami, which used innovative animation techniques to illuminate the spiritual state of a cloistered nun. This can again be seen in her second feature film, Heroine of Hell, which was funded by a grant from the Independent Television Service, a PBS-backed production initiative launched in the early 1990s to develop innovative creative work for public television.

She shot Heroine of Hell, a narrative combining medieval iconography with a present-day storyline and starring Catherine Keener and Dermot Mulroney, on location in Miami, completing it in 1995. It was distributed via PBS to member stations in 1996.

A full-length script, Sleeping Beauty, was optioned by an independent filmmaker in Los Angeles in 1991. Keene had two projects in progress at the time of her death. One, a script entitled Belle, was based on the true story of a female serial killer, Belle Gunness, in La Porte, Indiana, in the early years of the 20th century.

She had nearly completed a third feature film, Barefoot to Jerusalem, at the time of her death. Barefoot to Jerusalem is a story of a woman's journey, after her lover's suicide, through a solitary landscape which brings her into battle with the devil. The film was shot on location in Madison, Wisconsin and in the Upper Peninsula of Michigan in 2001 and was in the final stages of post-production at the time of her death. It has since been completed and was released in 2008.
