= Dermot Mulroney =

American actor (born 1963)

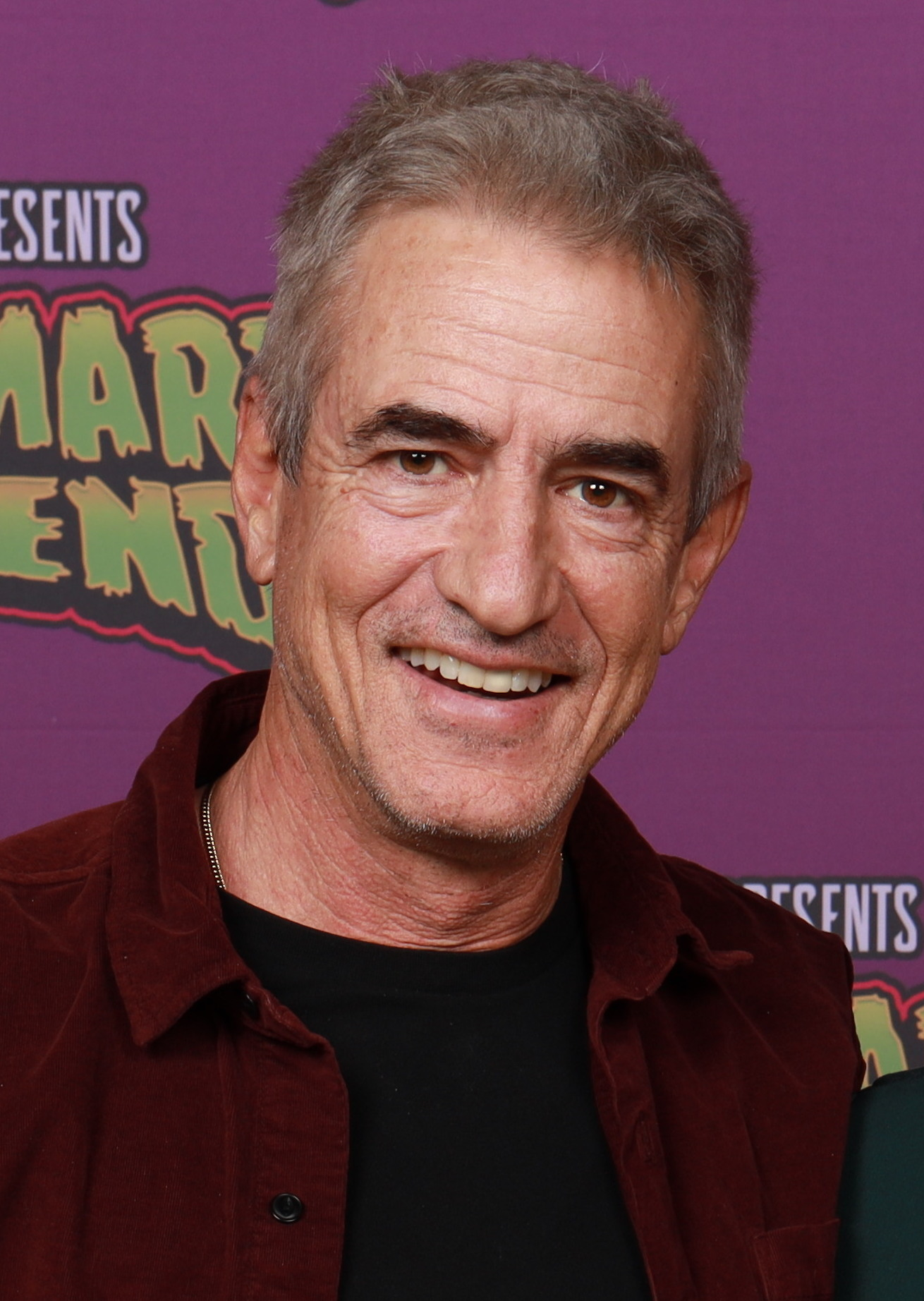
- Mulroney in 2025
- Born: Dermot Patrick Mulroney; October 31, 1963 (age 63); Alexandria, Virginia, U.S.
- Education: Northwestern University
- Occupations: Actor, musician
- Years active: 1986–present
- Spouses: Catherine Keener (m. 1990; div. 2007); Prima Apollinaare (m. 2010; div. 2025)
- Children: 3

Dermot Patrick Mulroney (born October 31, 1963) is an American actor and musician. He is known for his roles in a wide variety of genres, including romantic comedy, western, and drama films. After making his film debut in Sunset (1988), Mulroney gained recognition for his starring role in the films Young Guns (1988) and Career Opportunities (1991). In the 1990s, Mulroney starred in the films Point of No Return (1993), Bad Girls (1994), Copycat (1995), How to Make an American Quilt (1995), and My Best Friend's Wedding (1997), the last of which became his highest grosser at the box office.

In the 2000s, Mulroney starred in the films About Schmidt (2002), The Wedding Date (2005), Must Love Dogs (2005), The Family Stone (2005), and Zodiac (2007). In the 2010s, Mulroney starred in the films The Grey (2011), Jobs (2013), August: Osage County (2013), Insidious: Chapter 3 (2015), and Dirty Grandpa (2016); however, he primarily worked in television, with main roles as Francis Gibson on the NBC thriller series Crisis (2014) and Dr. Walter Wallace on the CBS medical drama series Pure Genius (2016–2017), as well as a recurring role as Sean Pierce on seasons 5 and 6 of the Showtime series Shameless (2015–2016).

In the 2020s, Mulroney continued his television work, with main roles as John Carmichael on the Amazon Prime Video series Hanna (2020–2021), President James Ritson on the Disney+ series Secret Invasion (2023), and Chief Dom Pascal on the NBC series Chicago Fire (2024–2026). He also starred in the films Scream VI (2023), Shooting Stars (2023), and Anyone But You (2023).

Outside of acting, Mulroney is also a cellist. He has played the cello for scores of multiple films, including Jurassic World (2015), Zootopia (2016), Rogue One (2016), Spider-Man: Homecoming (2017), Incredibles 2 (2018), and Spider-Man: Far From Home (2019).

== Early life and education ==
Mulroney was born on Halloween, 1963, in Alexandria, Virginia, a suburb of Washington, D.C. His father, Michael Mulroney of Elkader, Iowa, was a law professor at Villanova University School of Law beginning in the 1990s; before that time, he had a private practice in tax law for thirty years in Washington, D.C. Mulroney's mother, Ellen, was a regional theater actress who was originally from Manchester, Iowa. Mulroney is of Irish and German descent, and is the middle child among five siblings. He has two older brothers, Conor and Sean; a younger brother, Kieran Mulroney, who is an actor and screenwriter; and a younger sister, Moira.

Mulroney attended Matthew Maury Elementary School and played cello in school and city youth orchestras, as well as acted in children's community theater. He finished 9th and 10th grades at George Washington High School, before attending T. C. Williams High School (class of 1981) in Alexandria, Virginia. During his sophomore year in high school, he attended the Interlochen Arts Camp as a cellist. Beginning at age 18, Mulroney studied communications at Northwestern University in Evanston, Illinois, where he was a member of the Phi Gamma Delta fraternity, and graduated in 1985.

Mulroney has a scar on his upper lip from a childhood accident, about which he explained, "I was 3½ and I was carrying a dish for our pet rabbits. And I tripped and it broke, and I fell on it."

== Acting career ==
=== 1986–1996 ===
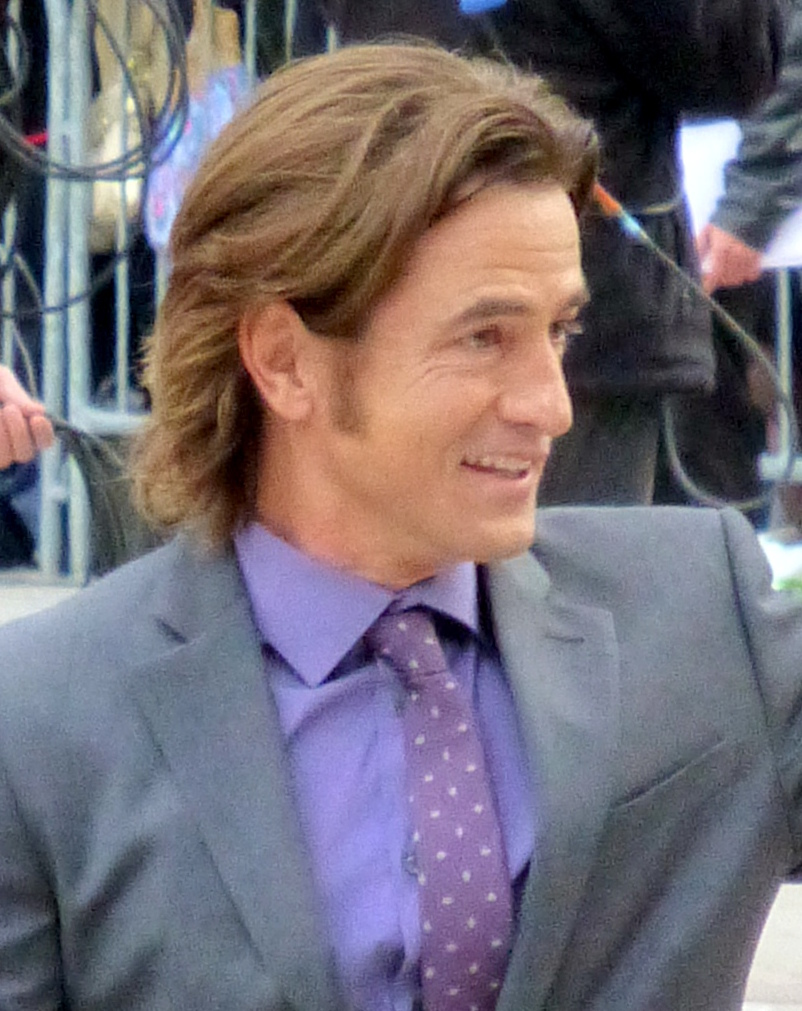
Mulroney at the 2013 Toronto International Film Festival

In his senior year in college, Mulroney responded to a sign-up sheet and auditioned in front of WMA agent Barbara Gale, who offered him a contract and asked him to relocate to Hollywood. There, Mulroney auditioned for three months before landing the role of the male lead in his debut in Sin of Innocence. In his first decade acting, Mulroney appeared in a slew of drama films often dealing with heavy subject matter: Sin of Innocence (1986), in which he played a stepbrother romantically involved with his stepsister after their parents marry; Daddy (1987), in which he played the boyfriend in a couple struggling with teenage parenthood; the Lee Grant sibling family drama Staying Together (1989); Unconquered (1989), in which he portrayed the son of Richmond Flowers Sr., an opponent of Alabama Governor George Wallace's segregationist policies; Longtime Companion (1989), in which he portrayed the first HIV/AIDS patient to die of the disease in a widely released film; Where the Day Takes You (1992), in which he plays the leader of a group of teenage runaways trying to survive in the streets of Los Angeles; and supporting roles in the Emmy Award-nominated Family Pictures (1993), which dealt with the struggles of raising a child with autism, and Bastard out of Carolina (1996), which dealt with abuse and molestation.

In 1988, Mulroney appeared in the baseball flick Long Gone, for which he was nominated for Best Supporting Actor in a Miniseries or Movie at the CableACE Awards. In 1989, he appeared in Survival Quest, during which he met Catherine Keener. While filming, in 1986, Keener was caught in a river current and floated precariously close to whitewater rapids when Mulroney jumped in and the pair were picked up half a mile downstream. The two eventually married in 1990. The couple would go on to appear together in four other films: Living in Oblivion (1995), Heroine of Hell (1996), Box of Moonlight (1996) and Lovely & Amazing (2001). Mulroney's roles in Samantha (1991) and Where the Day Takes You (1992) awarded him Best Actor at the Seattle International Film Festival. In 1993, he wrote the song "Someone Else's Used Guitar" for Peter Bogdanovich's The Thing Called Love, in which he also starred. Mulroney also had a cameo in the Joaquin Phoenix–directed video "Tired of Being Sorry" for Balthazar Getty's band Ringside.

Mulroney appeared in a number of western films throughout this period, namely Young Guns in 1988, Silent Tongue and The Last Outlaw in 1993, and Bad Girls in 1994. The Sam Shepard-directed Silent Tongue would mark the second in a series of four collaborations, with the two previously appearing together on screen in Bright Angel (1990), for which Mulroney won the Jury Special Prize at the Torino International Festival of Young Cinema. Mulroney co-starred in the comedy-drama films: Staying Together (1989); The Thing Called Love (1993), the second of two collaborations with River Phoenix before his death; and There Goes My Baby (1994), originally filmed in 1990. Mulroney appeared in the thriller films Point of No Return in 1993; Copycat in 1995; the Palme d'Or-nominated Kansas City, and The Trigger Effect in 1996. He was nominated for Best Kiss, with Winona Ryder, for How to Make an American Quilt (1996) at the MTV Movie Awards.

=== 1997–present ===
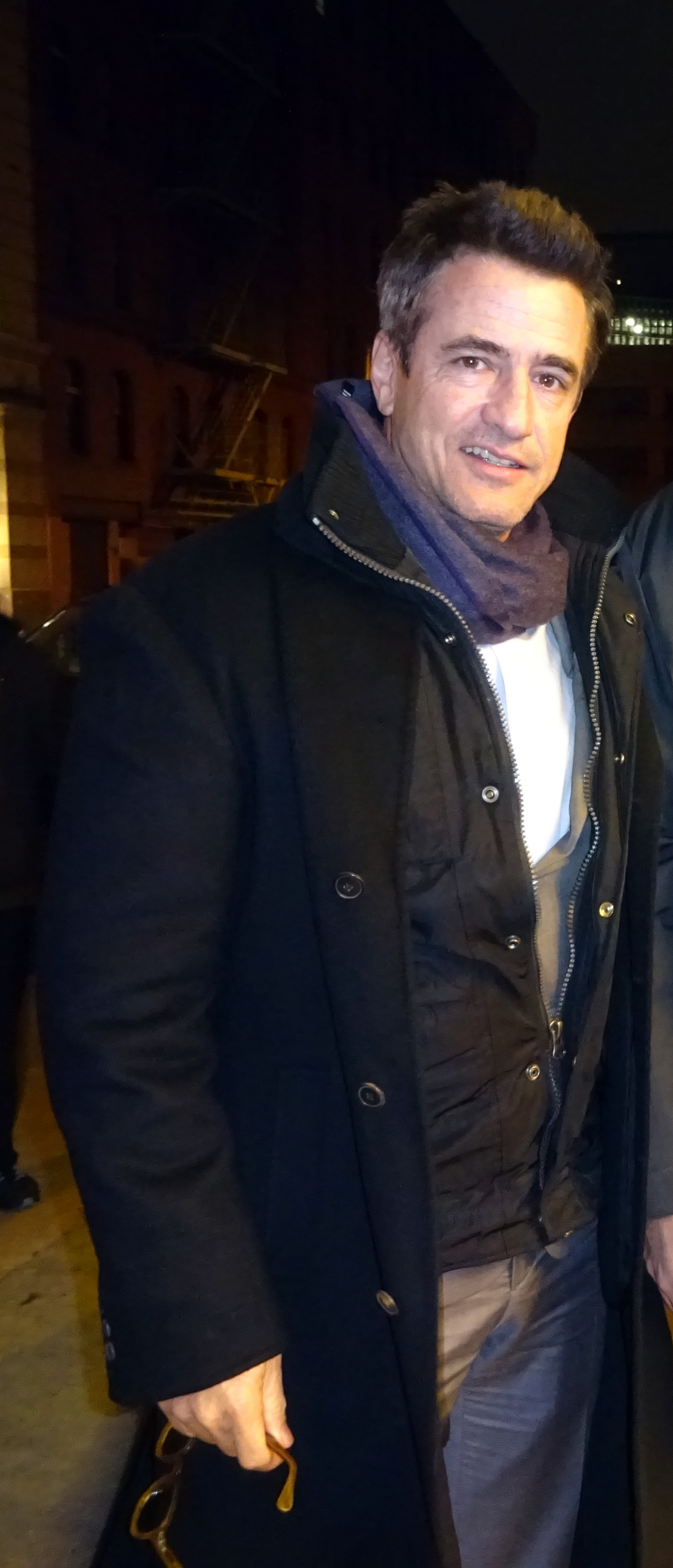
Mulroney in 2016

Several of his lead performances have been in romantic comedy films. Mulroney has appeared in many films, including as the male lead in My Best Friend's Wedding alongside Julia Roberts and Cameron Diaz. In 1993, Mulroney played "J.P", the boyfriend of star "Maggie" (played by Bridget Fonda) in Point of No Return. Mulroney also played the love interest of Madeleine Stowe in the western Bad Girls. In 2005, he played Nick Mercer, a male escort alongside Debra Messing in The Wedding Date and co-starred in the ensemble film The Family Stone, with Sarah Jessica Parker. He was also in the film Abduction (2011) as Martin Price.

In 2003, Mulroney played Gavin Mitchell on the TV series Friends. He appeared in three episodes of the ninth season, his character briefly dating Rachel. This would mark Mulroney's last on-screen appearance on television for a number of years, later revealing in a May 2007 interview that he had turned down TV series roles in favor of film. In 2007, Mulroney appeared in the fifth season of The Batman as Green Lantern / Hal Jordan. In 2011, he directed the feature film Love, Wedding, Marriage.

In 2012, Mulroney played the love interest of Zooey Deschanel, Russell, in the Fox series New Girl. In 2013, he played the title starring role in the psychotronic horror film The Rambler, which premiered at the 2013 Sundance Film Festival. He also starred alongside Lin Shaye, Angus Sampson, and Stefanie Scott in the 2015 horror sequel Insidious: Chapter 3. He is the narrator of Legends & Lies (2015–2016) executive produced by Bill O'Reilly for Fox News Channel. He also appeared in the hit Showtime series Shameless as Sean, a recovering drug addict who runs a restaurant. In 2023, Mulroney starred in the sixth installment of the Scream franchise and starred in the Marvel Cinematic Universe television series Secret Invasion.

== Musical career ==
Mulroney is an accomplished cellist. In 1996, he was part of a band called the Low and Sweet Orchestra that released an album in 1996, Goodbye to All That. In 2005, he appeared alongside Boyd Tinsley for Alanis Morissette's show at the House of Blues in Hollywood. He played the cello in the films The Thing Called Love, where he portrayed an aspiring country singer, the 1987 made-for-TV movie Daddy, and Samantha, where he portrayed a college student studying music. He played cello in the song "Place Your Hand" from Melissa Etheridge's 1992 album Never Enough, on the EP for Rain Phoenix's band Papercranes, and on the scores for Mission: Impossible III (2006), Mission: Impossible – Ghost Protocol (2011), and Star Trek Into Darkness (2013). In 2016, his band, Cranky George, released its debut album Fat Lot of Good. Most recently, he portrayed a cello soloist in the second and third seasons of Mozart in the Jungle.

== Personal life ==
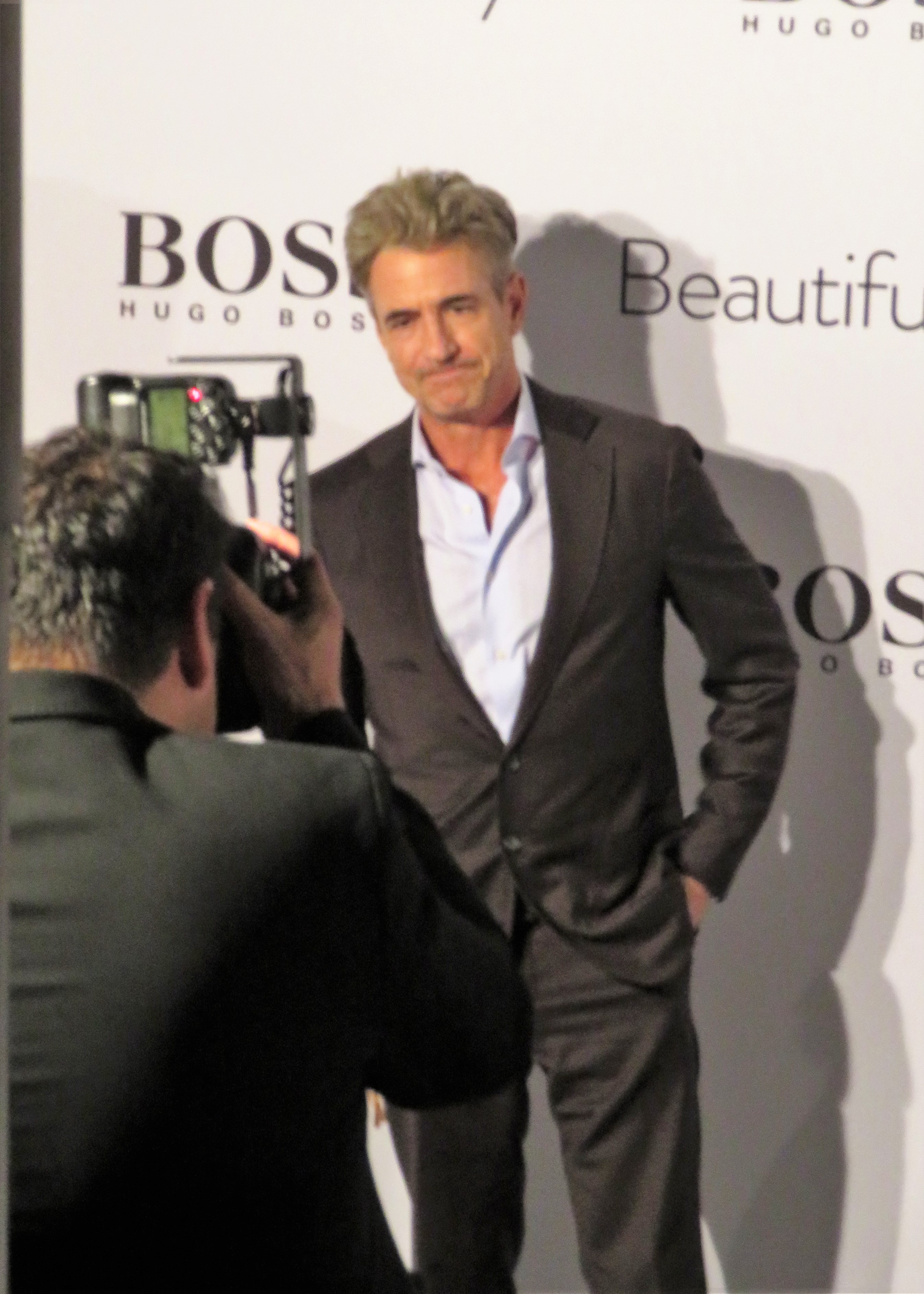
Dermot Mulroney in 2018

Mulroney married actress Catherine Keener in 1990 after they met in 1986 when filming Survival Quest. They have a son named Clyde Keener Mulroney (born June 21, 1999) who is a singer. The couple separated in May 2005 and Mulroney filed for divorce on June 11, 2007, citing irreconcilable differences. Their divorce became final on December 19, 2007. In 2010, he married Italian Tharita Cesaroni, who changed her name to Prima Apollinaare in 2015. They have two daughters. Mulroney filed for divorce from Apollinaare on June 23, 2025. The divorce was finalized in March 2026.

Mulroney was included in People's Sexiest Men of the Year issue in 2005 as its "Sexiest Jack of Arts".

== Filmography ==
Key
†	Denotes works that have not yet been released

=== Film ===
Year	Title	Role	Notes	Reference(s)
1988	Sunset	Michael Alperin		
1988	Young Guns	Dirty Steve Stephens		
1989	Staying Together	Kit McDermott		
1989	Survival Quest	Gray Atkinson		
1989	Longtime Companion	John		
1990	Bright Angel	George Russell		
1991	Career Opportunities	Nestor Pyle		
1991	Samantha	Henry		
1992	Where the Day Takes You	King		
1993	Silent Tongue	Reeves McCree		
1993	Point of No Return	J. P.		
1993	The Last Outlaw	Eustis		
1993	The Thing Called Love	Kyle Davidson		
1994	Bad Girls	Josh McCoy		
1994	There Goes My Baby	Pirate		
1994	Angels in the Outfield	Mr. Bomman		
1994	Scene Six, Take One	Wolf	Short film	
1995	Copycat	Inspector Ruben Goetz		
1995	How to Make an American Quilt	Sam		
1995	Living in Oblivion	Wolf Überman	Also associate producer	
1996	God's Lonely Man	—N/a	Cellist	
1996	Kansas City	Johnny O'Hara		
1996	The Trigger Effect	Joe		
1996	Box of Moonlight	Wick		
1996	Bastard Out of Carolina	Lyle Parsons		
1997	My Best Friend's Wedding	Michael O'Neal		
1999	Goodbye Lover	Jake Dunmore		
2000	Trixie	Dexter "Dex" Lang		
2000	Where the Money Is	Wayne MacKay		
2001	The Safety of Objects	Jim Train		
2001	Investigating Sex	Edgar Faldo		
2001	Lovely & Amazing	Kevin McCabe		
2002	About Schmidt	Randall Hertzel		
2004	Undertow	John Munn		
2004	Hair High	Rod	Voice	
2005	The Wedding Date	Nick Mercer		
2005	Must Love Dogs	Bob Connor		
2005	The Family Stone	Everett Stone		
2006	Mission: Impossible III	—N/a	Cellist	
2006	Griffin & Phoenix	Henry Griffin		
2007	Dante's Inferno	Dante Alighieri	Also cellist Voice	
2007	Zodiac	Captain Marty Lee		
2007	Georgia Rule	Dr. Simon Ward		
2007	Gracie	Bryan Bowen		
2008	Jolene	Uncle Phil		
2008	Burn After Reading	Star of "Coming Up Daisy"		
2008	Flash of Genius	Gil Previck		
2009	Kisses Over Babylon	Warden	Short film	
2009	Star Trek	—N/a	Cellist	
2010	Inhale	Paul Stanton		
2011	Abduction	Martin Price		
2011	J. Edgar	Colonel Norman Schwarzkopf Sr.		
2011	The Family Tree	Jack Burnett		
2011	Love, Wedding, Marriage	—N/a	Director	
2011	Mission: Impossible – Ghost Protocol	—N/a	Cellist	
2012	Struck by Lightning	Neal Phillips		
2012	The Grey	Jerome Talget		
2012	Big Miracle	Colonel Scott Boyer		
2012	John Carter	—N/a	Cellist	
2012	Trade of Innocents	Alex Becker		
2012	Beyond	Officer Jack Musker		
2013	Space Warriors	Andy Hawkins		
2013	Stoker	Richard Stoker		
2013	The Rambler	The Rambler		
2013	Jobs	Mike Markkula		
2013	A Glimpse Inside the Mind of Charles Swan III	Doctor		
2013	August: Osage County	Steve Heidebrecht		
2013	Star Trek Into Darkness	—N/a	Cellist	
2014	Dawn of the Planet of the Apes	—N/a	Cellist	
2015	Careful What You Wish For	Elliott Harper		
2015	Tomorrowland	—N/a	Cellist	
2015	Truth	Lawrence Lanpher		
2015	Insidious: Chapter 3	Sean Brenner		
2015	Jurassic World	—N/a	Cellist	
2015	Inside Out	—N/a	Cellist	
2015	The D Train	Himself		
2016	Dirty Grandpa	David Kelly		
2016	Lavender	Patrick		
2016	Zootopia	—N/a	Cellist	
2016	Star Trek Beyond	—N/a	Cellist	
2016	Rogue One: A Star Wars Story	—N/a	Cellist	
2017	Sleepless	Stanley Rubino		
2017	Spider-Man: Homecoming	—N/a	Cellist	
2017	War for the Planet of the Apes	—N/a	Cellist	
2017	The Mountain Between Us	Mark Robertson		
2018	I Still See You	August Bittner		
2018	Incredibles 2	—N/a	Cellist	
2018	Cats and Peachtopia	Blanket	Voice	
2019	Sgt. Will Gardner	Buddy		
2019	Spider-Man: Far From Home	—N/a	Cellist	
2019	The Courier	Special Agent Roberts		
2020	Hard Luck Love Song	Rollo		
2021	The Blazing World	Tom Winter		
2021	Deadly Illusions	Tom Morrison		
2021	Christmas Is Cancelled	Jack Lockhart		
2022	Along for the Ride	Robert West		
2022	Gone in the Night	Nicholas Barlow		
2022	Umma	Danny		
2022	The Inhabitant	Ben Haldon		
2022	Agent Game	CIA Officer Harris		
2022	Section Eight	Sam Ramsey		
2023	Scream VI	Detective Wayne Bailey		
2023	You're Killing Me	Congressman Schroder		
2023	Shooting Stars	Keith Dambrot		
2023	Breakwater	Ray Childress		
2023	The Dirty South	Jeb Roy		
2023	The Warrant: Breaker's Law	Yule Bronson		
2023	Ruthless	Harry		
2023	Anyone but You	Leo Spence		
2024	Lights Out	Sage Parker		
2024	Guns & Moses	Alan Rosner		
2024	Blackwater Lane	Matthew Anderson		
2024	Depravity	Mr. Evers		
2025	Laws of Man	Benjamin Bonney		
2025	Like Father Like Son	Gabe McKennan		
2025	When I'm Ready	Keith		
2025	Killing Mary Sue	Bradley Weiner		
2025	Swiped	Matthew Slate		
2025	Night Patrol	Sarge		
2025	Long Shadows	Dallas Garrett		
2026	Let's Love	Jerry		
2026	Dead of Night †	Sheriff Weaver	Post-production	
2026	November 1963 †	Charles Nicoletti	Post-production	
2027	The Families Stone †	Everett Stone	Filming	
TBA	The Gettysburg Address †	Andrew Gregg Curtin	Voice; In-production	
TBA	Dead and Breakfast †	Norman	Post-production	
TBA	Perfectly Imperfect †	Jake	Post-production	
TBA	Drifter †	TBA	Filming	
TBA	Hollow Moon †	Sam Foster		
TBA	Streets †	Gordon		

=== Television ===
Year	Title	Role	Notes	Reference(s)
1986	Sin of Innocence	Tim McGary	Television film (CBS)	
1986	Fame	Max	Episode: "Losin' It"	
1986	CBS Schoolbreak Special	Doug Dawson	Episode: "The Drug Knot"	
1987	Daddy	Bobby	Television film (ABC)	
1987	Long Gone	Jamie Weeks	Television film (HBO)	
1989	Unconquered	Richmond Flowers Jr.	Television film (CBS)	
1992	The Heart of Justice	Elliot Burgess	Television film (TNT)	
1993	Family Pictures	Mack Eberlin	Television film (ABC)	
1993	The Last Outlaw	Eustis	Television film (HBO)	
1996	Heroine of Hell	Callum	Television film (PBS)	
2003	Friends	Gavin Mitchell	3 episodes; Season 9	
2007–2008	The Batman	Hal Jordan / Green Lantern	Voice; 3 episodes	
2008	The Memory Keeper's Daughter	Dr. David Henry	Television film (Lifetime)	
2011	Silent Witness	Tony Lord	Television film (TNT)	
2012–2018	New Girl	Russell Schiller	8 episodes; Seasons 1, 2 and 7	
2012	Saturday Night Live	Himself	Episode: "Jamie Foxx / Ne-Yo"	
2013	Enlightened	Jeff Flender	6 episodes; Season 2	
2014	Crisis	Francis Gibson	13 episodes; Main cast	
2015	Extant	Taalr	Episode: "Change Scenario"; uncredited; Voice	
2015	Northpole: Open for Christmas	Ian Hanover	Television film (Hallmark)	
2015–2017	Shameless	Sean Pierce	23 episodes; Seasons 5, 6 and 8	
2015–2016	Mozart in the Jungle	Andrew Walsh	3 episodes; Seasons 2 and 3; Also contributed to soundtrack	
2016–2017	Pure Genius	Dr. Walter Wallace	Main cast, 13 episodes	
2016	Soundbreaking	Narrator	8 episodes	
2017	American Dad!	Jesse	Episode: "Julia Rogerts"; Voice	
2017	American Horror Story: Cult	Bob Thompson	3 episodes	
2017	The Christmas Train	Tom Langdon	Television film (Hallmark Hall of Fame); Also contributed to soundtrack	
2018	LA to Vegas	Captain Steve Jasser	2 episodes	
2018	Kingpin	Narrator	4 episodes	
2018	Rob Riggle's Ski Master Academy	Himself	3 episodes	
2018	Homecoming	Anthony	Main cast, 3 episodes	
2018	Into the Dark	Henry Tooms	Episode: "Flesh & Blood"	
2018	Drunk History	Georges Ladoux	Episode: "Femme Fatales"	
2018–2019	The Purge	Bobby Sheridan	Recurring cast (Season 2)	
2018–2019	Arrested Development	Dusty Radler	7 episodes	
2018–2019	Station 19	Greg Tanner	Recurring cast, 5 episodes	
2019	Four Weddings and a Funeral	Bryce Dylan	Recurring cast, 6 episodes	
2019	The Righteous Gemstones	Johnny Seasons	Recurring cast, 4 episodes	
2020	Messiah	President John Young	2 episodes	
2020	Prodigal Son	Nicholas Endicott	3 episodes; Season 1	
2020	The Eric Andre Show	Himself	Episode: "Lizzo Up"	
2020–2021	Hanna	John Carmichael	16 episodes	
2023	Ghosts of Beirut	Robert Ames	Episode: "Emergence"	
2023	Secret Invasion	President James Ritson	Main cast, 4 episodes	
2024–2026	Chicago Fire	Battalion Chief Dominic "Dom" Pascal	Main cast, 31 episodes	
2025–2026	Chicago Med	Battalion Chief Dominic "Dom" Pascal	2 episodes	
2025–2026	Chicago P.D.	Battalion Chief Dominic "Dom" Pascal	2 episodes	
2025–present	The Hunting Wives	Jed Banks	Main cast, 8 episodes	

== Awards and nominations ==
Year	Event	Category	Nominated work	Result
1988	CableACE Awards	Best Supporting Actor in a Miniseries or Movie	Long Gone	Nominated
1990	Torino International Festival of Young Cinema	Jury Special Prize	Bright Angel	Won
1992	Seattle International Film Festival	Best Actor	Samantha; Where the Day Takes You	Won
1996	MTV Movie Awards	Best Kiss (shared with Winona Ryder)	How to Make an American Quilt	Nominated
2007	Philadelphia Film Festival	Artistic Achievement Award	Himself	Won
2013	Seattle Film Critics Society	Award for Best Ensemble	August: Osage County	Nominated
2013	Screen Actors Guild Awards	Outstanding Performance by a Cast in a Motion Picture	August: Osage County	Nominated
2013	Washington D.C. Area Film Critics Association Awards	Best Ensemble	August: Osage County	Nominated
