= Samantha (film) =

1992 American film

- VHS cover
- Directed by: Stephen La Rocque
- Written by: John Golden; Stephen La Rocque
- Produced by: Donald P. Borchers
- Starring: Martha Plimpton; Dermot Mulroney; Hector Elizondo; Mary Kay Place; Ione Skye
- Cinematography: Joey Forsyte
- Edited by: Lisa Zeno Churgin
- Music by: Joel McNeely
- Distributed by: Academy Entertainment Inc.
- Release dates: September 10, 1991 (Boston Film Festival); November 20, 1992 (United States)
- Running time: 96 minutes
- Country: United States
- Language: English
- Box office: $2,814 (USA)

Samantha is a 1991 American film starring actress Martha Plimpton. Though at the time Plimpton was already a film actress for nearly ten years, this was the first vehicle in which she was the star. The film co-starred Dermot Mulroney, Hector Elizondo, Mary Kay Place and Ione Skye. It was a commercial failure, with mixed critical reviews.

The film was released in the fall and promoted as a romance blockbuster. A soundtrack/score album was released in anticipation of success that never came. The film featured cameo appearances by Robert Picardo and Maryedith Burrell. Burrell had previously played the character of Helen Buckman, mother to Julie Buckman in the television version of the film Parenthood; in the film version, Julie was played by Martha Plimpton.

== Plot ==
Samantha is a hugely talented violinist who discovers on her 21st birthday that she was left on the steps of her parents, Marilyn and Walter's home and subsequently adopted.

She goes into a panic, asserting that everything she has believed herself to be is a lie. She abandons music just before her senior university recital. She moves in with childhood friend Henry. As she searches for her true identity she becomes oblivious to the inconvenience and suffering her search is causing the people she loves.

Ultimately she locates her birth parents, Neil and Charlotte Otto, who are emotionally cold towards her but, who are professional concert musicians, a harpist and a flautist. She realizes that her gift of music came from within, but that despite no blood-connection, her family is truly her own.

== Cast ==
- Martha Plimpton as Samantha
- Mary Kay Place as Marilyn
- Hector Elizondo as Walter
- Dermot Mulroney as Henry
- Maryedith Burrell as Charlotte Otto
- Robert Picardo as Neil Otto
- Ione Skye as Elaine

== Reception ==
In his 1992 review of the movie, film critic Roger Ebert wrote "Because it is impossible to feel much sympathy for her, the movie, which is intended as a comedy, turns into a test of patience."
