= Joshua Zeman =

American documentary director, writer and producer

- Born: Sea Cliff, New York, U.S.
- Occupations: Director; writer; producer
- Years active: 2002 – present

Joshua Zeman is an American film director, writer and producer. He is best known for his film and streaming documentaries Cropsey, The Killing Season, Murder Mountain, and The Sons of Sam: A Descent Into Darkness. His most recent project is the 2024 documentary Checkpoint Zoo, which he also directed and produced. Zeman’s directorial work spans a variety of films and series that explore the intersections of folklore, true crime, and investigative journalism.

== Early life and education ==
Zeman was raised in Staten Island, New York, where his parents, both avid readers of mystery and horror novels, introduced him to these genres at an early age. His father served as the treasurer of the Mystery Writers of America, which gave Zeman early exposure to influential figures in the genre, including meeting Stephen King at the age of eight. He attended Lehigh University in Pennsylvania, initially pursuing a degree in business before switching to journalism.

== Career ==
=== Directing ===
Zeman's breakthrough came with Cropsey, a critically acclaimed horror documentary that premiered at the Tribeca Film Festival in 2009. Co-directed with Barbara Brancaccio, the film explores the urban legend of "Cropsey" on Staten Island, New York, and its connection to a series of real-life child disappearances involving convicted kidnapper Andre Rand. Cropsey was a Critics’ Pick with The New York Times, The Wall Street Journal, and Roger Ebert, who praised its unsettling atmosphere and unique narrative. The New York Times described the film as “haunting,” while Ebert called it "a creepy documentary with all the elements of a horror film about a demented serial killer—and an extra ingredient: This one is real."

Delving further into the world of folklore and crime, Zeman directed Killer Legends, a documentary that investigates the intersection between true crime and folklore, including the "Hookman" and poisoned Halloween candy. His first long-form series was The Killing Season, which premiered on A&E in 2016. Executive produced by Academy Award-winning filmmaker Alex Gibney, the eight-part series was one of the first to explore the then-unsolved Gilgo Beach murders. Zeman's investigation forced authorities to reveal that remains of the Long Island Jane Doe, "Peaches" found in Nassau County, were also found along Ocean Parkway, thus confirming she was a victim of the Long Island Serial Killer (LISK). Zeman also confirmed that Dave Schaller, Amber Costello's roommate, had mentioned a "green avalanche" in a filmed interview. The "green avalanche" was the primary clue in a police report that led authorities to Rex Heuermann, who has been charged with the murder of a least four women. Many armchair sleuths watching the show suspect that Heuermann may have called the production team during filming, further underscoring the series’ impact in renewing public interest and investigative efforts surrounding the case.

In 2021, Zeman executive produced and directed The Sons of Sam: A Descent Into Darkness, a four-part docuseries for Netflix that examines journalist Maury Terry’s investigation into the Son of Sam case. Narrated by Paul Giamatti, the series became the #1 most-watched program on Netflix in the United States and several other countries following its release. Zeman also created the companion podcast, Searching for the Sons of Sam, which delves further into his relationship with Terry. During the final years of Terry’s life, Zeman developed a close friendship with the journalist, who urged him to adapt his 1987 book, The Ultimate Evil, into a documentary. Although Zeman initially declined, he revisited the idea after Terry’s death in 2015, gaining access to Terry’s investigative files, which ultimately inspired the creation of the series.

That same year, Zeman wrote and directed The Loneliest Whale: The Search for 52, a documentary that follows the search for the elusive 52-hertz whale, which scientists believe communicates at a frequency unlike any other whale species, possibly leading to a life of isolation. The film, distributed theatrically by Bleecker Street, was executive produced by Leonardo DiCaprio and nominated for three Critics Choice Documentary Awards. It was also selected as the opening film for the UN Climate Change Conference. The Loneliest Whale received positive reviews for its emotional resonance and environmental focus, with The Hollywood Reporter describing it as "poetic" and "profoundly moving." The film was featured in outlets such as Time Magazine, The New York Times, and People Magazine, and has been likened to "a modern-day Moby Dick" for its captivating narrative.

In 2024, Zeman premiered Checkpoint Zoo at the Tribeca Film Festival, where it won the audience award. The documentary follows the efforts of staff at Feldman Ecopark in Kharkiv, Ukraine, to rescue thousands of animals trapped amid the Russian invasion of Ukraine. Under constant threat of attack, the team evacuated over 4500 animals. The film was noted for its immersive footage and emotional narrative, with reviewers praising its exploration of the connection between humans and animals in crisis. Checkpoint Zoo was recognized for bringing attention to environmental and humanitarian challenges, earning critical acclaim for its nuanced portrayal of compassion under extreme circumstances.

=== Screenwriting and Producing ===
Zeman’s early work in screenwriting includes his first screenplay, Fresh Kills, which was optioned by New Line Cinema and Forensic Films. He was awarded a MacDowell Colony Fellowship and the San Francisco Film Society screenwriting grant for his screenplay Collider. In addition to his writing, Zeman directed the short film The Best Man for the Job, featuring David Call (Tiny Furniture) and Joseph Sikora (Power).

As a producer and co-producer, Zeman has contributed to several notable narrative films. His credits include The Station Agent, which won the Audience Award and Screenwriting Award at the Sundance Film Festival; Mysterious Skin, which premiered at the Venice Film Festival and was nominated for an IFP Gotham Award; The Hawk Is Dying, which screened at the Sundance Film Festival and Directors' Fortnight at Cannes; and Against the Current, which also premiered at Sundance.

== Awards and Recognitions ==
Zeman has received recognition for his documentary work. His 2009 documentary Cropsey was nominated for Best Documentary at the Chicago International Film Festival and won the Audience Award at the SINY Film Festival in 2010. His nature documentary The Loneliest Whale: The Search for 52 was nominated for three critics choice awards including best nature documentary. The film also received the Grand Prize at the Innsbruck Nature Film Festival.

In 2024, Zeman’s Checkpoint Zoo won the Zelda Penzel Giving Voice to the Voiceless Award at the Hamptons International Film Festival and the Audience Award for Documentary at the Mill Valley Film Festival. The film also won an Audience Award at the Tribeca Film Festival.

In addition to his film awards, Zeman has been recognized with a MacDowell Colony Fellowship in 2012 and the Djerassi Residency Award from the San Francisco Film Society in 2013 for screenwriting.

== Filmography ==
| Year | Title | Contribution | Note |
|---|---|---|---|
| 2002 | Mafia NY: Lifestyles of the Rich and Dangerous | Writer and producer | Documentary |
| 2003 | The Station Agent | Co-producer | Feature film |
| 2003 | Phileine Says Sorry | Producer | Feature film |
| 2004 | Mysterious Skin | Co-producer | Feature film |
| 2006 | The Hawk Is Dying | Producer | Feature film |
| 2006 | Choking Man | Producer | Feature film |
| 2009 | Against the Current | Producer | Feature film |
| 2009 | Rain Fall | Producer | Feature film |
| 2009 | Cropsey | Director, writer and producer | Documentary |
| 2011 | The Best Man For The Job | Director and writer | Short film |
| 2014 | Killer Legends | Director, writer and producer | Documentary |
| 2016 | The Killing Season | Director, writer and producer | Documentary series |
| 2018 | Murder Mountain | Director | Documentary series |
| 2021 | The Sons of Sam: A Descent into Darkness | Director and producer | Documentary series |
| 2021 | The Loneliest Whale: The Search for 52 | Director, writer and producer | Documentary |
| 2024 | Checkpoint Zoo | Director and producer | Documentary |

== Awards and nominations ==
| Year | Result | Award | Category | Work | Ref. |
|---|---|---|---|---|---|
| 2006 | Won | Gotham Awards | Best Film Not Playing at a Theater Near You | Choking Man | |
| 2009 | Nominated | Chicago International Film Festival | Best Documentary | Cropsey | |
