= Zachary Mortensen =

American film producer (born 1972)

- Born: October 5, 1972 (age 53); Madison, Wisconsin, U.S.
- Occupations: Film producer, writer, founder
- Website: www.zachmortensen.com

Zachary Mortensen (born October 5, 1972) is an American film producer, writer and founder of the production company Ghost Robot.

== Biography ==
Zachary Mortensen is the founder and CEO of Ghost Robot, a production and management company in New York City. In 2006 Mortensen produced the feature films Choking Man by iconoclastic music video director Steve Barron, which premiered at the Tribeca Film Festival and Dr. Bronner's Magic Soapbox, a film about E. H. Bronner by director Sara Lamm, which premiered at the Mill Valley Film Festival. "Dr. Bronner's Magic Soapbox" was released in theaters in the summer of 2007 by Balcony Releasing. Mortensen's feature film Road by director Leslie McCleave premiered at the Los Angeles Film Festival in 2005 where it was awarded outstanding performance for the two leads, Catherine Kellner and Ebon Moss-Bachrach and was released theatrically in 2006 by 7th Art Releasing.

In 2001, Mortensen produced the feature documentary Hell House by director George Ratliff which premiered at the Toronto International Film Festival and was released theatrically in fall 2002. Mortensen produced the award winning documentary features Breath Control: The History of the Human Beat Box and The Federation of Black Cowboys. He also produced the theatrical documentary Stoked: The Rise and Fall of Gator directed by Helen Stickler.

Mortensen produced The New Arrival by Amy Talkington, which was the first motion picture using 360-degree video technology. The movie was a collaboration between Intel Corporation, Atom Films, and BeHere, the company behind the revolutionary technology, and it premiered at the market at the Cannes Film Festival in 2000. The following year, Mortensen produced the first commercially released Music video created entirely with Machinima software. That video was In the Waiting Line by the band Zero 7, directed by Tommy Pallotta.

In 1997–98, Mortensen was the Director of Production at Caipirinha Productions, where he supervised the post-production and distribution of the critically acclaimed documentary feature Modulations.

Mortensen served as executive producer for the 2009 documentary film Cropsey, directed by Joshua Zeman and Barbara Brancaccio. The film explores the urban legend of “Cropsey” and investigates real-life child disappearances on Staten Island.

Mortensen is the writer and creator of the scifi comic series The Gatecrashers which was drawn by Sutu the artist behind the award-winning web series Nawlz. The Gatecrashers first book A Night of Gatecrashing was named to The Village Voice's best Comics and Graphic Novels of 2014.

In 2023 Mortensen created the sci-fi storyworld Space Hoppers with his daughter Zella. The first commercial release for the Space Hoppers is the card game Space Hoppers: Singko Academy.

Mortensen continues to produce feature films, commercials, music videos, and television.

== Selected filmography ==
- Checkpoint Zoo (2024) producer
- Creative Control (film) (2016) producer
- Thanksgiving (2014) producer
- Unity of All Things (2013) producer
- Birth Story: Ina May Gaskin and the Farm Midwives (2013) producer
- First Winter (2012) producer
- Love Letter (2011) executive producer
- Against The Current (2008) co-executive producer
- Cropsey (2008) producer
- Dr. Bronner's Magic Soapbox (2006) producer
- Choking Man (2006) producer
- Road (2005) producer
- Phileine zegt sorry (2003) line producer
- In the Waiting Line (2003) producer
- The Federation of Black Cowboys (2003) producer
- Stoked: The Rise and Fall of Gator (2002) producer
- Breath Control: The History of the Human Beat Box (2002) producer
- Destiny (2002) (V) producer
- Trappedinfreedom (2002) producer
- Hell House (2002) producer
- The New Arrival (2000) producer
- Second Skins (1998) producer
- March 29, 1979 (1997) producer
- Highball (1997) line producer
- Vertical City (1996) line producer
- America's Most Wanted producer, 4 episodes
- Bittersweet Motel (2000) production manager: "The Great Went"
- Modulations (1998) post-production supervisor
- Wrestling With Alligators (1998) production manager
- Scrapple (1998) production manager
- Ties to Rachel (1997) unit manager
