= Hell House =

A hell house is a haunted attraction typically run by American fundamentalist Protestant churches.

Hell House may also refer to:

- Hell House (novel), a 1971 horror novel by Richard Matheson
- Hell House (film), a 2001 American documentary film
- Hell House LLC, a 2015 American found-footage horror film
- "Hell House" (Supernatural), a 2006 TV episode
- Hell House, a 2006 play by Alex Timbers
- Hell House, a 2015 program broadcast by Investigation Discovery
- Hell House (Urbex), an abandoned campus in Ilchester, MD

== See also ==
- Hell's House, a 1932 film directed by Howard Higgin
- The Legend of Hell House, a 1973 film adaptation of Matheson's novel
