= Murder of Arlis Perry =

Murder of an American woman

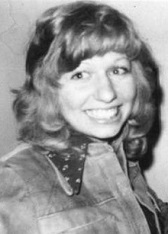
- Perry in 1974
- Born: Arlis Kay Dykema; February 22, 1955; Linton, North Dakota, U.S.
- Died: October 12, 1974 (aged 19); Stanford Memorial Church, Stanford, California, U.S.
- Cause of death: Penetrating stab wound to the cranium
- Body discovered: Rear of Memorial Church's east transept, near the altar
- Occupation: Receptionist
- Spouse: Bruce D. Perry

Arlis Kay Perry (née Dykema; February 22, 1955 – October 12, 1974) was a 19-year-old American newlywed who was murdered inside Stanford Memorial Church, within the grounds of Stanford University in California, on October 12, 1974.

The murder went unsolved for more than forty years before police named Stephen Blake Crawford as the perpetrator following DNA profiling in 2018. Crawford, a security guard at Stanford who reportedly discovered the body, killed himself before he could be arrested.

== Background ==
Arlis Kay Dykema grew up in Bismarck, North Dakota, where she and Bruce D. Perry were high-school sweethearts. In August 1974, six weeks before her death, Arlis moved to the Stanford University campus with her husband, who was a sophomore pre-med student. At the time of her murder, Arlis had been working as a receptionist at a local law firm.

== Murder ==
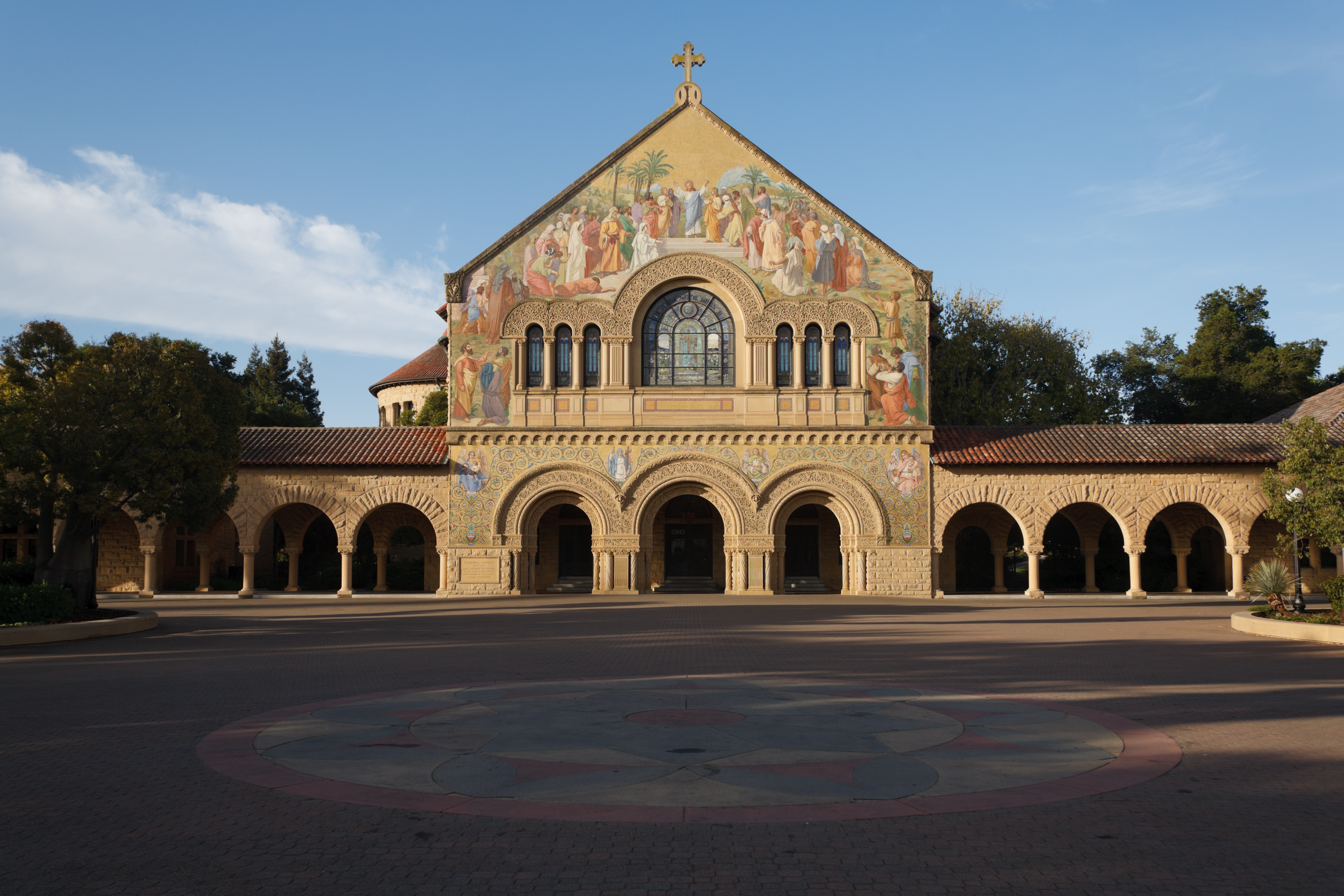
Stanford Memorial Church

Around 11:30 p.m. the night of October 12, 1974, the Perrys had an argument about their car's tire pressure. Perry told her husband that she wanted to pray alone inside the Stanford Memorial Church, and they parted. Bruce became concerned when his wife had not returned home by 3:00 a.m. and called the Stanford police to report her missing. However, officers from the Santa Clara County Sheriff's Office went to the church and reported all the outer doors were locked.

Campus security guard Stephen Crawford, a former Stanford police officer, claimed to have found Perry's body around 5:45 a.m. October 13, in the church's east transept, near the altar. She was found face-up with her hands folded across her chest. An ice pick was sticking out of the back of her head, though the handle had broken off and was missing. There were also signs of strangulation. Police reported that Perry was naked from the waist down. A three-foot (1 meter) long altar candle was inserted in her vagina, and another placed between her breasts. Her jeans had been arranged across her legs in a diamond pattern.

== Investigation ==
Crawford told police he had locked up the church a little after midnight after noticing no apparent activity inside. He also claimed (later found to be false) to have rechecked the doors around 2:00 a.m. and found they were still locked. When Crawford visited the church at 5:45 a.m. to open it for the day, he said he found the west side door open and that it had been forced from the inside.

Investigators found semen on a kneeling pillow near Perry's body. They also found a partial palm print on one of the candles. Neither the semen nor the print matched Bruce Perry or Crawford. The Santa Clara County Sheriff's Office also ruled out any links between the murder and three previous killings in the area dating back to February 1973 (two of which were later attributed to John Getreu). Perry's husband was an initial suspect, but was eventually ruled out.

At least seven people were in the Stanford Memorial Church during the night of October 12 and the morning of October 13; among them were Perry and Crawford. Four other people were identified; a seventh was not. A passerby noted this young man was about to enter the church around midnight. He had sandy-colored hair and was not wearing a watch; was of medium build; and stood about five-foot-ten.

The case remained open and was routinely reviewed as a cold case by the cold case unit of the Santa Clara County District Attorney's and Sheriff's Office. In 2018, however, Crawford was definitively linked to the murder following a more advanced DNA test. On June 28, as police arrived at Crawford's residence at Camden Avenue in San Jose, California, 20 miles (32 km) from Stanford University, with a search warrant, Crawford committed suicide with a pistol before he could be arrested.

== Alleged Son of Sam link ==
Serial killer David Berkowitz mentioned the Perry murder in a few letters, suggesting that he heard details of the crime from "Manson II", the alleged culprit. In the San Jose Mercury News, Jessie Seyfer noted that "investigators interviewed Berkowitz in prison and now believe he has nothing of value to offer" regarding the Perry case. However, investigative reporter Maury Terry noted that Berkowitz had volunteered information about the case without being prompted, writing in 1979: "ARLISS [sic] PERRY, HUNTED, STALKED AND SLAIN. FOLLOWED TO CALIFORNIA. STANFORD UNIV."

Terry interviewed Perry's friends in Bismarck, discovering that someone on the Stanford campus had taken a telephone listing under Bruce Perry's name. The resultant confusion when Perry's best friend and Bruce's mother attempted to reach the Perrys at the fraudulent phone number apparently led Perry to call the number herself and speak to someone in residence there.

In a September 27, 1974 letter to her friend, Perry wrote:

I had to laugh about your call to Bruce Perry. Mrs. Perry made the same mistake. She called them, too. But the strange part of it is that his name is not only Bruce Perry but it is Bruce D. Perry, and not only that but it is Bruce Duncan Perry and he attends Stanford University, and he just got married this summer. One thing, his wife's name is not Arlis. Anyway, next time you get the urge to call, the number is -------. This time I guarantee you'll get the right Bruce Perry.

== Media ==
The case was covered in detail, along with the John Getreu murders, in a February 2020 episode of Casefile True Crime Podcast.

The supposed links between David Berkowitz and the Perry murder were outlined in the Netflix documentary The Sons of Sam: A Descent Into Darkness.

== See also ==
- List of solved missing person cases (1970s)

== Cited works and further reading ==
- Wilson, Colin (1995) [1992]. Serial Murderers. Malaysia: Marshall Cavendish Books. pp. 124–126. ISBN 978-1-854-35834-9.
- Terry, Maury (1987). The Ultimate Evil: An Investigation into America's Most Dangerous Satanic Cult. Doubleday. ISBN 0-385-23452-X.
- Terry, Maury (1989). The Ultimate Evil-The Truth about the Cult Murders Son of Sam and Beyond (7th ed.). Bantam Books. ISBN 0553276018.
