= Creative Control (disambiguation) =

Creative Control may refer to:

- Artistic control, the authority to decide how a final media product will appear
- Creative Control (business), a New York-based online TV network
- Creative control (business), a Los Angeles-based music supervision company
- Creative Control TV, an online TV network
- Creative Control (film), a 2015 film directed by Benjamin Dickinson
- The Harris Brothers, a professional wrestling tag team who used the stage name Creative Control
