= Killing Season =

Killing Season may refer to:

- A British name for the July effect, a phenomenon in healthcare involving novice physicians
- Killing Season (2008 album)
- Killing Season (film), a 2013 American action thriller film
- The Killing Season (2015 Australian TV series), about the Rudd-Gillard Government (2007-2010)
- The Killing Season (2016 U.S. TV series), about the Long Island Serial Killer
- "The Killing Season" (Cardiac Arrest), a 1994 television episode
