= Killer Legends =

- Written by: Joshua Zeman
- Directed by: Joshua Zeman
- Starring: Rachel Mills; Joshua Zeman
- Country of origin: United States
- Original language: English

Production
- Producer: Rachel Mills
- Cinematography: Gregory Palmer
- Editors: Aaron Crozier; Brian McAllister
- Running time: 84 minutes
- Production companies: Gulp Pictures; Storyville Entertainment; Gigantic Picture

Original release
- Network: Chiller
- Release: March 16, 2014

Killer Legends is a 2014 American documentary written and directed by Joshua Zeman for Chiller. Zeman and Rachel Mills, a researcher, investigate the real-life origins of several urban legends.

== Plot ==
Joshua Zeman and Rachel Mills investigate the origins of several urban legends:

The Hookman
In The Hook, a man with a hook for a hand attempts to murder teenagers who park in a lovers' lane. Zeman and Mills trace this to the Texarkana Moonlight Murders, an unsolved crime that was the basis for the early slasher film The Town That Dreaded Sundown. Zeman and Mills compare and contrast the film to the real-life events, and both to the urban legend. Neither the real-life events nor the film feature a killer with a hook for a hand, but they do have a serial killer who preys upon teenagers who make out at a lovers' lane.

The Candyman
Zeman and Mills travel to Houston, Texas, to investigate the urban legend of poisoned candy. Though they dismiss the widespread belief that strangers have handed out poisoned candy to neighborhood children, Zeman and Mills describe Ronald Clark O'Bryan, a man who poisoned his own son for insurance money and used the urban legend to deflect suspicion from himself. To mask his son's murder, O'Bryan also attempted to kill several other children, but they did not eat their poisoned candy. O'Bryan was convicted and executed for the crimes.

The Babysitter and the Man Upstairs
In Columbia, Missouri, Zeman and Mills investigate the legend of The Babysitter and the Man Upstairs, in which a babysitter is harassed and ultimately killed by a man already inside the house. Although there are no documented cases of serial killers who have targeted babysitters, Zeman and Mills describe how Janett Christman was murdered while babysitting. An African-American man was convicted of a similar murder four years earlier and executed for the murder, but Zeman and Mills question whether he was guilty. They instead point to an acquaintance who knew Christman was babysitting and had become obsessed with her.

The Killer Clown
In Chicago, Zeman and Mills investigate the evil clown trope and associated "phantom clown" sightings across the world. In these cases, children report having seen a suspicious clown that attempts to entice them into an unmarked van, presumably to kidnap them. Zeman and Mills express skepticism and explain it as a manifestation of coulrophobia, the fear of clowns. They trace this urban legend to John Wayne Gacy, a serial killer who unrelatedly worked as a clown. Although Gacy never killed anyone while dressed as a clown, they state that his infamy popularized the trope.

== Cast ==
- Rachel Mills
- Joshua Zeman

== Production ==
After directing Cropsey, a documentary that examines the similarities between a New York urban legend and a real-life kidnapper, Zeman approached Chiller with the idea of a series based on the intersection of urban legends and true crime. For business reasons, the series was retooled into an anthology TV film. Clowns were not initially planned to be a subject covered in the documentary, but Mills uncovered a large amount of information on them. Upon bringing this to Zeman's attention, he agreed to expand the documentary to include them.

== Release ==
Killer Legends played for one night at the Nitehawk Cinema in Brooklyn, New York on March 13, 2014. Chiller aired it on March 16, 2014. Breaking Glass Pictures released the DVD on July 1, 2014. It was one of the top ten best-selling independent film on iTunes in July 2014.

== Reception ==
Patrick Cooper of Bloody Disgusting rated it 4/5 stars and called it "a wholly fascinating experience on a lot of levels", though he criticized it for focusing so much on the filmmakers. Brutal as Hell wrote, "Overall what we have here is a very thoughtful and interesting documentary. It will entertain you, creep you out and you will probably learn some history along the way." Michel Sabourin of HorrorTalk rated it 4.5/5 stars and praised the atmosphere and pacing. Horror Society rated it 4/5 stars and called it "insightful and well put together".
