= Checkpoint Zoo =

2024 documentary film about the war in Ukraine

- Directed by: Joshua Zeman
- Written by: Joshua Zeman, Daniel Lonsbury
- Produced by: Joshua Zeman, Zachary Mortensen, Ian Davies, Torquil Jones
- Cinematography: Nelson Hume, Olivier Sarbil
- Edited by: Cy Christiansen, Andrew Ford, Kelly Kendrick, Daniel Lonsbury
- Music by: Anne Nikitin
- Production companies: Ghost Robot, Noah Media Group
- Release date: June 6, 2024 (Tribeca Film Festival)
- Running time: 107 minutes
- Countries: United States; United Kingdom
- Languages: English; Ukrainian; Russian

Checkpoint Zoo is a 2024 American documentary film directed by Joshua Zeman. The film follows a group of Ukrainian zookeepers and volunteers who risked their lives to rescue animals trapped in Feldman Ecopark during the 2022 Russian invasion of Ukraine. The film had its world premiere at the Tribeca Film Festival and received positive reviews from critics.

== Synopsis ==
The documentary deals with the 71-day rescue mission to evacuate thousands of animals from Kharkiv’s Feldman Ecopark, which was shelled with Russian artillery during the Russian invasion of Ukraine in 2022.

== Production ==
Director Joshua Zeman was inspired to create the documentary after seeing a viral video of ChiChi the chimpanzee wandering Freedom Square in Kharkiv. The team gathered footage from zookeepers and news reports and made trips to the site to film additional footage on location.

== Release ==
Checkpoint Zoo had its world premiere at the 2024 Tribeca Film Festival on June 6, 2024, On October 4, 2025, the film was made available globally for one day only via the Gathr Direct-to-Audience VOD platform in honor of World Animal Day. It is available to stream on Prime Video and Apple TV.

== Critical response ==
The film was praised by critics for its emotional storytelling and depiction of human-animal compassion during wartime. Britt Collins of The Daily Beast wrote that it as "a work of heart-stopping suspense and tenderness." Dennis Harvey of Variety praised Joshua Zeman's direction, describing it as polished and suspenseful.

== Awards and honors ==
Award	Date	Category	Recipient	Result	Ref.
Palm Springs International Film Festival	January 2025	Desert Views Award, Audience Award	Checkpoint Zoo	Won	
Annapolis Film Festival	March 2025	Jury Prize	Checkpoint Zoo	Won	
Mill Valley Film Festival	October 2025	Audience Award	Checkpoint Zoo	Won	
Minneapolis St. Paul International Film Festival	April 2025	Best Documentary	Checkpoint Zoo	Won	
Salem Film Festival	March 2025	Audience Award: Best Film	Checkpoint Zoo	Won	
OKO International Ethnographic Film Festival	September 2025	Jury Grand Prize	Checkpoint Zoo	Nominee	
Tribeca Film Festival	June 2024	Audience Award (2nd Place)	Checkpoint Zoo	Won	
Hamptons International Film Festival	October 2024	Zelda Penzel "Giving Voice to the Voiceless" Award	Checkpoint Zoo	Won	
Miami International Film Festival	April 2025	Documentary Achievement Jury Award	Checkpoint Zoo	Won	
