= 52-hertz whale =

Whale who calls at unusual frequency

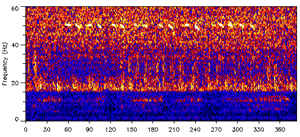
A spectrogram of the 52-hertz signal

The 52-hertz whale, colloquially referred to as 52 Blue or "The Loneliest Whale", is an individual whale of unidentified species that calls at the unusual frequency of 52 hertz in the north Pacific Ocean between Aleutian and Kodiak Islands to the California coast. The whale itself has never been sighted: it has only been heard via hydrophones, but its call has been detected since the late 1980s in a pattern that matches the migration of the blue whale and the fin whale. Those species call at 10 to 39 Hz and 20 Hz respectively. Described as the "world's loneliest whale", it appeared to be the only individual emitting a whale call at this frequency. However, recordings of a second 52-hertz whale, heard elsewhere at the same time, have been sporadically found since 2010.

The 52 Hz frequency is roughly equivalent to the musical note G^{#}_{1}, which is the 12th lowest key on a standard 88-key piano keyboard, or the 4th finger position on the lowest string (E_{1}) of a double bass.

== Characteristics ==
The 52-hertz whale
The signal was recorded in the northeast Pacific. It has been sped up ten times, raising the pitch to 520 Hz (C_{5}).

The sonic signature is that of a whale, albeit at a unique frequency. The call patterns resemble neither blue nor fin whales, being much higher in frequency, shorter, and more frequent. Blue whales usually vocalize at 10–39 Hz, fin whales at 20 Hz. The calls of this whale are highly variable in their pattern of repetition, duration, and sequence, although they are easily identifiable due to their frequency and characteristic clustering. The calls deepened slightly to around 50 hertz by 2004, consistent with the expectations of a maturing whale.

The migration track of the 52-hertz whale is unrelated to the presence or movement of other whale species. Its movements have been somewhat similar to that of blue whales, but its timing has been more like that of fin whales. It is detected in the Pacific Ocean every year beginning in August and remaining through December, and moves out of range of the hydrophones in January–February. It travels as far north as the Aleutian and Kodiak Islands, and as far south as the California coast, swimming between 30 and 70 km (20 and 40 mi) each day. Its recorded distance traveled per season has ranged from a low of 708 km (440 mi) to a high of 11,062 km (6,874 mi) in 2002–03.

Scientists at the Woods Hole Oceanographic Institution have been unable to identify the species of the whale. They speculate that it could be malformed or a blue whale hybrid. The research team is often contacted by deaf people who wonder whether the whale might also be deaf.

Whatever biological cause underlies its unusually high-frequency voice does not seem to be detrimental to its survival. The whale's survival and apparent maturity indicate it is probably healthy. Still, its call is the only one of its kind detected anywhere and there is only one such source per season. Because of this, the animal has been called the loneliest whale in the world. Nevertheless, calls picked up by a sensor in California in 2010 suggest that there may be more than one whale calling at 52 Hz.

== History ==
Approximate map of the 52-hertz whale's migration range

The 52-hertz whale was discovered by a team from the Woods Hole Oceanographic Institution. Its call was first detected in 1989, then again in 1990 and 1991. In 1992, following the end of the Cold War, the U.S. Navy partially declassified the recordings and technical specifications of its SOSUS anti-submarine hydrophone arrays, and it made SOSUS available for oceanographic research. As of 2014, the whale had been detected every year since.

== In media ==
=== Films ===
The Loneliest, a short mockumentary film about two women searching for the loneliest whale, was made by Lilian T. Mehrel with support from an Alfred P. Sloan Foundation production grant.

The animated short film The Phantom 52 premiered at the Sundance Film Festival in January 2019. The film was written and directed by Geoff Marslett, and stars Tom Skerritt as the loneliest whale.

The feature-length documentary The Loneliest Whale: The Search for 52, directed by Joshua Zeman, the director of Cropsey, and executive producers Leonardo DiCaprio and Adrian Grenier, was commercially released by Bleecker Street on July 9, 2021. The film follows Zeman and a group of five scientists and oceanographers on a quest to find the whale off the coast of California. Funded through a Kickstarter campaign, the film received generally positive reviews among critics, holding an approval rating of 86% based on 35 reviews on Rotten Tomatoes. Time's Stephanie Zacharek called the film "both invigorating and calming to watch," while Katie Walsh wrote in the Los Angeles Times that the film is "a modern-day Moby Dick with a conservationist bent" that "surprises, delights and will keep you on the edge of your seat." Sheri Linden of The Hollywood Reporter wrote that "the film's epilogue caps the action with a rapturous surprise", referring to the sighting – complete with film footage – of a blue whale-fin whale hybrid, believed to be the source of the 52 Hz calls.

In 2025, the animated short film Whale 52 - Suite for Man, Boy, and Whale screened at Manhattan's IFC Center and at the Woodstock Film Festival. Based on the legend of the loneliest whale, the film was animated by Bill Plympton, and stars writer and performer Bruce Vilanch.

=== Music ===
Montreal-based saxophone player and composer Colin Stetson's 2013 album New History Warfare Vol. 3: To See More Light included a song entitled "Part of Me Apart From You". Though not explicitly written about the 52-hertz whale, when first performing the song live, he has remarked on at least several occasions that the story of the "loneliest whale" resonated deeply with his composition. "This whale is alone in a large body of water, swimming, singing its song, calling for a likeness it will never find," he said by way of introducing the song at a performance at Toronto's Great Hall on 19 May 2013. "When I play this song, I can't help but think about this whale, who right at this very minute is singing alone."

South Korean group BTS' 2015 album The Most Beautiful Moment in Life, Pt. 2 includes the track "Whalien 52", which explicitly uses the 52-hertz whale as a metaphor for the alienation from others often felt by adolescents.

English folk duo Kathryn Roberts and Sean Lakeman included the song "52 Hertz" on their 2015 album Tomorrow Will Follow Today. The song is about the whale and includes the line, "52 Hertz, 52 Hertz, I'm singing a love song that no-one can hear" in the chorus.

Chinese folk metal band The Samans included "Whalesong" in their 2012 EP with the same title. The song has lyrics such as "Making wishes that I will find my herd tomorrow" and "52 Hertz of heartbreak". This metal song features folk music elements, harsh death metal vocals and clean vocals. It was well received and soon became one of the signature songs of the band.

The 2019 album "52 Hertz" by Russian artist Santis is inspired by the image of a 52-hertz whale, which is used as a metaphor for loneliness, emotional victory, and the desire to be unique and understood by others. The album reimagines the whale's story through the theme of searching for a loved one and the inability to find common ground with others. According to support services, the song from the album has garnered tens of millions of plays.

=== Books ===
In 2020, Japanese novelist Sonoko Machida published the novel 52-Hertz Whales, in which the anomalous whale serves as a metaphor for "voiceless" lonely people who find each other by chance. A Japanese film adaptation of the novel premiered in 2024.

In 2014, American writer Leslie Jamison published an essay in The Atavist Magazine about the 52-hertz whale's popular appeal as a metaphor for loneliness and perseverance. The piece was later included in Jamison's 2019 essay collection Make It Scream, Make It Burn.

The 2019 book Song for a Whale by American author Lynne Kelly features a fictional whale known as Blue 55, who the author has stated is directly inspired by the 52-hertz whale.

== See also ==
- List of unexplained sounds
- List of individual cetaceans
