= Alex Lasarenko =

American composer, pianist, and director

- Crop of the only known publicly released photo of Lasarenko
- Born: Alexander Lasarenko; July 13, 1963
- Died: November 8, 2020 (aged 57)
- Occupations: Composer, pianist, creative director
- Known for: Disney Channel mnemonic

Alexander Lasarenko (July 13, 1963 – November 8, 2020) was an American composer, classical pianist, and creative director. He is most widely known for composing the four-note mnemonic for the Disney Channel, which has been used in the network's branding since 2002, following a documentary by YouTube channel Defunctland.

== Career ==
=== Early career and Elias Arts ===
During his time at Elias, Lasarenko also contributed to film projects, working as a studio assistant on the production of the song "Smile" for the 1992 film Chaplin and co-composing the score for Streetwise (1993).

Lasarenko served as a creative director for musician Jonathan Elias.

=== Tonal Sound and film/television composing ===
In 2002, Lasarenko founded his own music and sound design company, Tonal Sound.

His television work included creating remixes of his original theme for the long-running PBS series Nature.

== Death ==
Lasarenko died on November 8, 2020, at the age of 57.

== Discography ==
=== Film scores ===
Year	Title	Role
1993	Streetwise	Co-composer
2000	Dinner Rush	Composer
2001	The Business of Strangers	Composer
2009	Cropsey	Composer
2021	The Loneliest Whale: The Search for 52	Co-composer
