= Buck Simmonds =

American actor

- Occupation: actor

Buck Simmonds is an American actor.

He appeared in the 1992 film A River Runs Through It and the 1998 film Scrapple.
