= The Loneliest Whale: The Search for 52 =

2021 American nature documentary

- Theatrical release poster
- Directed by: Joshua Zeman
- Written by: Joshua Zeman; Lisa Schiller
- Produced by: Joshua Zeman; Jonathan Shukat
- Cinematography: Nelson Hume; Alan Jacobsen
- Edited by: Aaron Crozier; J.D. Marlow
- Music by: Alex Lasarenko; David Little
- Production company: Appian Way Productions
- Distributed by: Bleecker Street
- Release dates: June 17, 2021 (NFF); July 9, 2021 (United States)
- Country: United States
- Language: English
- Box office: $107,798

The Loneliest Whale: The Search for 52 is a 2021 American documentary film, directed, written, and produced by Joshua Zeman. Leonardo DiCaprio and Adrian Grenier serve as executive producers. The film follows a group of scientists in search of the 52-hertz whale, a whale which is believed to have spent its life in solitude, calling out at a frequency different from any other whale. It was commercially released in theaters and on video on demand by Bleecker Street on July 9, 2021.

== Synopsis ==
The film follows Zeman and a team of oceanographers and scientists on a quest to find the "52-hertz whale", which scientists believe has spent its entire life in solitude calling out at a frequency that is different from any other whale. Zeman also explores the Cold War science of submarine warfare that led to the original discovery of the 52-hertz whale, the negative impact of whaling, the release and reception of the Songs of the Humpback Whale record, the detrimental effects of ocean noise on whale and their communication, and how society's dependence on technology can lead to feelings of isolation among people.

== Cast ==
It features the following scientists and oceanographers:

- Ana Sirovic — Associate Professor at Texas A&M University at Galveston
- David Rothenberg — Musician and philosopher, Distinguished Professor at the New Jersey Institute of Technology
- Joe George — Retired Navy Ocean Systems Technician Analyst
- John Calambokidis — Senior Research Biologist and one of the founders of Cascadia Research Collective
- John Hildebrand — Distinguished Professor at the Scripps Institution of Oceanography of the University of California at San Diego

== Production ==
In February 2015, it was announced Joshua Zeman would direct a documentary film revolving around the 52-hertz whale, with Adrian Grenier set to executive produce, and crowdfunded through Kickstarter. In March 2015, it was announced Leonardo DiCaprio had joined the film, as an executive producer under his Appian Way Productions banner.

== Release ==
In March 2021, Bleecker Street acquired U.S. distribution rights to the film. The film had its world premiere at the Nantucket Film Festival on June 17, 2021. It was released in a limited release on July 9, 2021, prior to video on demand on July 16, 2021. On October 12, 2021, the film was released on Hulu.

== Reception ==
=== Critical response ===
On Rotten Tomatoes, the series holds an approval rating of 88% based on 42 reviews, with an average rating of 7.2/10. On Metacritic, the series holds a rating of 69 out of 100, based on 7 critics, indicating "generally favorable" reviews.

In the LA Times, Katie Walsh called the film "a modern-day Moby Dick with a conservationist bent" that "surprises, delights and will keep you on the edge of your seat." Sheri Linden of The Hollywood Reporter called it "a well-rounded overview" with "bright buoyancy", and Jeannette Catsoulis of The New York Times called it a "piquant" and "unexpectedly endearing... bobbing meditation on our own species' environmental arrogance." Stephanie Zacharek of Time said it was "both invigorating and calming to watch" while still being "surprisingly exciting." Carlos Aguilar of The Wrap said it was an "engaging exploration" with "a satisfying conclusion that's never too convenient."
