= Eastbound Strangler =

American serial killer

- Other name: Atlantic City Serial Killer

Details
- Victims: 4
- Span of crimes: October – November 2006
- Country: United States
- State: New Jersey
- Date apprehended: N/A

The Eastbound Strangler is an unidentified serial killer believed to be responsible for the murders of four women near Atlantic City, New Jersey, United States, in 2006. A $25,000 reward offered for information has gone unclaimed.

== Background ==
Four dead bodies of women identified as sex workers were found in a drainage ditch filled with shallow water on November 20, 2006 behind the Golden Key Motel on the Black Horse Pike in Egg Harbor Township, situated on the outskirts of Atlantic City, New Jersey. All of them were placed face down in a row, facing east, about sixty feet apart from each other. They were clothed except for having their shoes and socks removed. They were believed to have been strangled to death.

== Investigation ==
41-year-old repairman Terry Oleson, who was being allowed to stay for free at the Golden Key Motel in exchange for repairs when the murders took place, was implicated by his girlfriend as the killer. They were reportedly having a domestic dispute at the time. In Oleson's room, investigators found cameras set up and images of his girlfriend's teenage daughter undressing. There have been no DNA matches to connect Oleson with the crimes and he was never named as a suspect.

Eldred Raymond Burchell, who had given himself the nickname of the "River Man" (possibly reference to Green River Killer Gary Ridgway), was suspected after he had confessed to another prostitute that he had killed people. However he has not been connected to any murders.

Charles Coles, a drug dealer and a friend of Kim Raffo; was questioned by police but released without charge, as was Mark Hessee, an acquaintance of Kim Raffo and Barbara Breidor.

=== Theory of Gilgo Beach serial killings connection ===
In 2010, law enforcement officials investigated a possible connection between the Eastbound Strangler and the Gilgo Beach serial killings but later ruled it out. In 2023, the theory on a connection between the two cases was revisited following the arrest of a suspect in four of the Gilgo Beach killings, according to Suffolk County police; prosecutors later ruled it out again.

== Victims ==
- Barbara V. Breidor, 42—Worked as a sex-worker and reportedly struggled with cocaine addiction. She disappeared in October 2006 but was not reported missing for several weeks. Identified through dental records, her body was so badly decomposed the cause of death could not be determined.
- Molly Jean Dilts, 20—Originally from Black Lick, Pennsylvania, she was last seen alive a few days before her disappearance. She was the only victim not to have a record for sex-work, but was believed to be working as a sex worker. She was believed to have been the first to be killed and her body was so badly decomposed the cause of death could not be determined.
- Kim Raffo, 35—Former waitress originally from Canarsie, Brooklyn, she was a wife and mother who was involved with sex work in Atlantic City. Last seen alive a day before the bodies were discovered. She was believed to be the last of the four victims to be killed and was strangled with a rope or cord.
- Tracy Ann Roberts, 23—Former erotic dancer and originally from a small town in Delaware, was also a sex worker in Atlantic City and struggled with drug addiction. Last seen alive in November 2006 when she was hit in the throat and hospitalized by a man who wished to be her pimp. She had been asphyxiated.

== Popular culture ==
Investigation Discovery's Dark Minds, hosted by M. William Phelps, aired an episode on the case. February 2, 2012.

The case was featured in episodes 3 ("Danse Macabre") and 4 ("A Darkness on the Edge of Town") of The Killing Season.

The case was mentioned in the 2021 Lifetime movie "The Long Island Serial Killer: A Mother's Hunt for Justice," which also dedicated itself in part to the four victims, which seemingly linked it to the Long Island Serial Killer case.

The case was covered on the true-crime podcast Method & Madness, Episode 77 The Path: Murders in Atlantic City

== See also ==
- List of fugitives from justice who disappeared
- List of serial killers in the United States
