= Youthville =

Nonprofit child welfare agency in Kansas, US

Youthville is a nonprofit child welfare agency in Kansas involved in Foster Care, Adoption, Residential Treatment, Counseling and Therapy. The agency was founded in the early 1920s as an outreach of the United Methodist Church to be a residence for homeless and abandoned children. Youthville exercises custody of over 1,400 Kansas children and is one of the largest nonprofit organizations in the state of Kansas.

== History ==
In the early 1920s, Edward P. Libbey left the bulk of his estate to the United Methodist Church's Youthville project. The City of Newton, Kansas, led additional fundraising efforts. The new funds enabled 20 acres (81,000 m^{2}) of land to be purchased for an orphanage, which then became the site of the Kansas Methodist Home for Children. Libbey Hall, named after Mr. Libbey, was built in 1929. The campus also included an orchard, barns, a farmhouse, stables, granaries, cow lots, and chicken houses. Over the next three decades, a chapel and residential cottages were also built.

In 1960, the Board of Trustees officially changed the agency name to United Methodist Youthville. They also approved a plan that focused on providing services to adolescent youth with emotional or social adjustment problems. That same year, Youthville took over the Bronco Buster Boys Ranch in Dodge City, Kansas. Youthville then planted offices across the state.

In 1996, Kansas became the first state in the nation to fully privatize its adoption, foster care, and family preservation services. Youthville has maintained the state's Region 5 foster care / reintegration contract since the inception of privatization by Kansas' Social and Rehabilitation Services (Child Protection Services) in 1996.

From 2001 through 2003, Youthville went through voluntary chapter 11 bankruptcy reorganization.

In early 2007, the Wichita Branch NAACP and Youthville held the first of a series of meetings to discuss the possibilities and options available for increasing the number of extended family and/or culturally compatible placements. According to the NAACP, "Of the 356 African American children from Sedgwick County, 47% are sent outside of the county to foster homes in more rural areas of Kansas, most often not of the same cultural background. And of the 147 Bi-Racial children from Sedgwick County, 31% are sent outside of the county to foster homes in more rural areas of Kansas, most often not of the same cultural background."

The organization acquired Family Consultation Service in July 2007, which employs over 20 therapists and offers psychiatric services and medication management.

In August 2008, Youthville's Trauma Recovery Center in Wichita, Kansas adopted Dr. Bruce Perry's Neurosequential Model of Therapeutics as its official clinical framework.

== Expressive Arts Program ==
Youthville's therapeutic Expressive Arts Program involves, among other activities, a unique traveling art exhibit called Walk-A-Mile consisting of shoes that the children of Youthville's Expressive Arts Program have designed and decorated to tell the story of their life in the child welfare system. Other artworks by Youthville children have been on display in various locations throughout Kansas.

The Expressive Arts Center also presents an annual summer Chalk Art Festival in Newton, Kansas. As a part of this festival, professional artists auction their works to raise money for Youthville.
