= David Berkowitz =

American serial killer (born 1953)

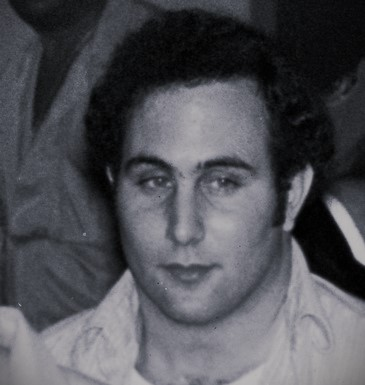
- Berkowitz during his arrest on August 10, 1977
- Born: Richard David Falco; June 1, 1953 (age 73); New York City, U.S.
- Other names: The Son of Sam; The .44 Caliber Killer; Mr. Monster
- Education: Bronx Community College; Sullivan Community College
- Convictions: Second degree murder (6 counts); Attempted second degree murder (7 counts)
- Penalty: Life imprisonment with the possibility of parole after 25 years

Details
- Span of crimes: December 24, 1975 – July 31, 1977
- State: New York
- Killed: 6
- Injured: 11
- Weapon: .44 Special caliber Bulldog revolver
- Date apprehended: August 10, 1977
- Imprisoned at: Shawangunk Correctional Facility

David Richard Berkowitz (born Richard David Falco; June 1, 1953), also known as the Son of Sam, the .44 Caliber Killer and the Phantom of the Bronx, is an American serial killer, serial arsonist, and former United States Army soldier who committed a stabbing and a series of shootings in New York City between 1975 and 1977, killing six people and wounding eleven others. Armed with a .44 caliber Bulldog revolver during most of his crimes, Berkowitz terrorized New York City with letters mocking police and promising further crimes, leading to possibly the biggest manhunt in the city's history.

With a parking ticket proving a vital clue to finding him, Berkowitz was arrested on August 10, 1977, and subsequently indicted for eight shootings. He confessed to all of them and initially claimed to have been obeying the orders of a demon manifested in the form of a black dog named "Sam", which belonged to his neighbor. After being found mentally competent to stand trial, Berkowitz pleaded guilty to second-degree murder and was sentenced to six concurrent life sentences with the possibility of parole after twenty-five years. He subsequently admitted the dog-and-devil story was a hoax. In police investigations, he was also implicated in many unsolved arsons in the city.

Intense media coverage of the case lent a kind of celebrity status to Berkowitz, which many observers noted he seemed to enjoy. The New York State Legislature enacted new statutes – known popularly as "Son of Sam laws" – designed to keep criminals from financially profiting from the publicity created by their crimes. The statutes have remained in New York despite various legal challenges, and similar laws have been enacted in several other states. During the mid-1990s, Berkowitz, by then professing to be a converted evangelical Christian, amended his confession to claim he had been a member of a violent Satanic cult that orchestrated the incidents as ritual murder. A new investigation of the murders began in 1996 but was suspended indefinitely after inconclusive findings.

== Early life ==
David Berkowitz was born Richard David Falco on June 1, 1953, in the Brooklyn borough of New York City. Within a few days of his birth, his biological mother, Elizabeth "Betty" Broder, gave the child up for adoption. Broder had grown up as part of an impoverished family and was working as a waitress at the time of Berkowitz's birth. In 1936 she had married Tony Falco, an Italian American. After a marriage of less than four years, Falco left her for another woman. Although Broder was married to Falco, Berkowitz's biological father was Joseph Kleinman, a married businessman who, like Berkowitz's mother, was Jewish.

The infant Richard was adopted by Pearl and Nathan Berkowitz of the Bronx. The couple were Jewish hardware store retailers of modest means, and childless in middle age. They reversed the order of the boy's first and middle names and gave him their own surname, raising the young David Richard Berkowitz as their only child. As a child, Berkowitz was frequently bullied for being Jewish, as well as for his "chubbiness".

Journalist John Vincent Sanders wrote that Berkowitz's childhood was "somewhat troubled". Although of above-average intelligence, he lost interest in his education at an early age and became infatuated with petty larceny and starting fires. He also suffered head injuries as a child. Neighbors and relatives later recalled Berkowitz as difficult, spoiled and a bully. His adoptive parents consulted at least one psychotherapist due to his misbehavior, but his actions never resulted in a legal intervention or serious mention in school records. He attended Public School #123, Public School #77 and Christopher Columbus High School, the latter from which he graduated in 1971.

When Berkowitz was aged 14, his adoptive mother died of breast cancer, and his home life became strained due to conflict with his adoptive father's second wife. While attending high school and college, he lived with his father in a four-and-a-half-room apartment at 170 Dreiser Loop in Co-op City. Following his graduation from high school, Berkowitz joined the United States Army; he was subsequently stationed at Fort Knox in the United States and with an infantry division in South Korea.

After an honorable military discharge in June 1974, Berkowitz located his birth mother. After a few visits, she disclosed the details of his birth; these greatly disturbed Berkowitz, particularly with regard to the array of reluctant father figures in his life. Forensic anthropologist Elliott Leyton later described Berkowitz's discovery of his birth details as the "primary crisis" of his life, a revelation that shattered his sense of identity. His communication with his birth mother later lapsed, but for a time he remained in communication with his adoptive sister Roslyn.

Berkowitz attended Bronx Community College for one year, enrolling in the spring of 1975. In 1976, he went to work as a driver for the Co-Op City Taxi Company. He subsequently had several non-professional jobs, and at the time of his arrest was working as a letter sorter for the United States Postal Service.

== Beginning of crimes (late 1975 to early 1977) ==
During the mid-1970s, Berkowitz began committing violent crimes. He bungled his first attempt at murder using a knife, then switched to a handgun and began a lengthy crime spree throughout the New York City boroughs of the Bronx, Brooklyn and Queens, seeking young female victims. Most of the crime scenes involved two victims; he committed some of the attacks while women sat with their boyfriends in parked cars. Berkowitz exhibited an enjoyment of his activities, often returning to the scenes of his crimes.

=== Forman stabbing (December 1975) ===
Berkowitz claimed to have committed his first attack on Christmas Eve 1975, when he was twenty-two years old, using a hunting knife to stab two women in Co-op City. The first alleged victim, a Hispanic woman, was never identified by police. The second was fifteen-year-old Michelle Forman, a sophomore at Truman High School, whom he stabbed six times on a bridge near Dreiser Loop and whose injuries were serious enough for her to be hospitalized for a week. The two stabbings occurred within several minutes of each other. Berkowitz was not suspected of these crimes, and soon afterward he relocated to an apartment in Yonkers.

=== Wendy Savino shooting (April 1976) ===
The first shooting attributed to Berkowitz occurred around 11:00 PM on April 9, 1976, in the parking lot of Nina's Restaurant at 3372 Boston Road in the Bronx. Wendy Savino, 38, was getting into her car when a man approached and fired five shots at point blank range, laughing as he did so. She pretended to be dead as the man fled the scene, and while severely wounded in her face, back, arm, chest and right eye, she managed to survive the shooting. She later described the man as "about 30 years old, 5 feet 9 inches tall and wearing a black leather jacket".

Her shooting would not be officially linked to the later Son of Sam attacks until 2024. In the words of now retired NYPD homicide detective Robert Klein, "It is the opinion of the investigators of the Bronx homicide squad and the Bronx District Attorney's office that David Berkowitz is responsible for the shooting of Wendy Savino".

=== Lauria and Valenti shooting (July 1976) ===
Pelham Bay area of the Bronx

The next shooting attributed to Berkowitz occurred in the Pelham Bay neighborhood of the Bronx. At about 1:10 a.m. on July 29, 1976, Donna Lauria (18), an emergency medical technician, and her friend Jody Valenti (19), a nurse, were sitting in Valenti's double-parked Oldsmobile discussing their evening at Peachtree's, a New Rochelle discotheque. According to Valenti, Lauria opened the car door to leave and noticed a man quickly approaching, carrying a paper bag. Startled and angered by his sudden appearance, Lauria said, "Now what is this..." The man produced a gun from the paper bag and crouched. Bracing one elbow on his knee, he aimed his weapon with both hands and fired. Lauria was struck by one bullet that killed her instantly. Valenti was shot in her thigh, and a third bullet missed both women. The shooter turned and quickly walked away.

Valenti survived her injury and said she did not recognize the killer. She described him as a white male in his thirties with a fair complexion, about 5 feet 8 inches (1.73 m) tall and weighing about 200 lb (91 kg). His hair was short, dark and curly in a "mod style". This description was repeated by Lauria's father, who claimed to have seen a similar man sitting in a yellow compact car parked nearby. Neighbors gave corroborating reports that an unfamiliar yellow compact car had been cruising the area for hours before the shooting. Years later, in 1993, an imprisoned Berkowitz admitted in an interview with journalist Maury Terry that he had shot Lauria and Valenti.

=== Denaro and Keenan shooting (October 1976) ===
Forest Hills Gardens, Queens. Most of Berkowitz's activity was in Queens, though he lived farther north in Yonkers.

On October 23, 1976, a similar shooting occurred in a secluded residential area of Flushing, Queens, next to Bowne Park. Carl Denaro (20), a Citibank security guard, and Rosemary Keenan (18), a Queens College student, were sitting in Keenan's parked car when the windows suddenly shattered. "I felt the car exploded," Denaro said later. Keenan quickly started the car and sped away for help. The panicked couple did not realize someone had been shooting at them, even though Denaro was bleeding from a bullet wound to his head. Keenan had only superficial injuries from the broken glass, but Denaro eventually needed a metal plate to replace a portion of his skull. Neither victim saw the attacker.

Police determined the bullets embedded in Keenan's car were .44 caliber, but they were so deformed they thought it unlikely they could ever be linked to a particular weapon. Because Denaro had shoulder-length hair, police later speculated the shooter had mistaken him for a woman. Keenan's father was a twenty-year veteran police detective of the New York City Police Department (NYPD), which encouraged an intense investigation. As with the Lauria–Valenti shooting, however, there seemed not to be any tangible motive for the shooting; police made little progress with the case. Many details of the Denaro–Keenan shooting were very similar to the Lauria–Valenti shooting, but police did not initially associate them, partly because the shootings occurred in different boroughs and were being investigated by different police precincts.

=== DeMasi and Lomino shooting (November 1976) ===
High school students Donna DeMasi (16) and Joanne Lomino (18) had walked home from a movie shortly after midnight on November 27, 1976. They were chatting on the porch of Lomino's home in Floral Park when a young man dressed in military fatigues approached them and began to ask directions.

In a high-pitched voice, the man said, "Can you tell me how to get...", but then quickly produced a revolver. He shot each of the victims once and, as they fell to the ground injured, he fired several more times, striking the house before running away. A neighbor heard the gunshots, rushed out of his house and reported seeing a blond man run past gripping a pistol in his left hand. DeMasi had been shot in the neck, but the wound was not life-threatening. Lomino was hit in the back and hospitalized in serious condition; she was ultimately rendered paraplegic.

=== Freund and Diel shooting (January 1977) ===
At about 12:40 a.m. on January 30, 1977, secretary Christine Freund (26) and her fiancé, bartender John Diel (30), were sitting in Diel's car near the Forest Hills LIRR station in Queens, preparing to drive to a dance hall after seeing a movie. Three gunshots penetrated the car. In a panic, Diel drove away for help. He sustained minor superficial injuries, but Freund was shot twice and died several hours later at the hospital. Neither victim saw their attacker.

Police then made the first public acknowledgment of a possible connection between cases, stating that the Freund–Diel shooting was similar to the earlier incidents. All the victims had been struck with .44 caliber bullets, and the shootings seemed to target young women with long dark hair. NYPD sergeant Richard Conlon stated police were "leaning towards a connection in all these cases." Composite sketches were released of the black-haired Lauria–Valenti suspect and the blond Lomino–DeMasi suspect, and Conlon noted police were looking for multiple suspects, not just one.

=== Voskerichian shooting (March 8, 1977) ===
At about 7:30 p.m. on March 8, 1977, Columbia University student Virginia Voskerichian (20) was walking home from school when she was confronted by an armed man. She lived about a block from where Freund had been shot. In an attempt to defend herself, Voskerichian lifted her textbooks between herself and her killer, but the bullet struck her head and ultimately killed her.

=== Press and publicity (March 10, 1977) ===
In a March 10, 1977, press conference, NYPD officials and Mayor Abraham Beame declared the same .44 Bulldog revolver had fired the shots that killed Lauria and Voskerichian. Official documents were later brought to the public eye, revealing that while police strongly suspected the same .44 Bulldog had been used in all of the shootings, the evidence was actually inconclusive.

The crimes were discussed by the local media virtually every day. Circulation increased dramatically for the New York Post and the Daily News, tabloid newspapers with graphic crime reporting and commentary. Foreign media featured many of the reports as well, including front page articles of newspapers such as the Vatican's L'Osservatore Romano, the Israeli newspaper Maariv and the Soviet Izvestia.

== Crimes continue (April to July 1977) ==
=== Esau and Suriani shooting (April) ===
At about 3:00 a.m. on April 17, 1977, Alexander Esau (20), a tow truck operator, and Valentina Suriani (18), a Lehman College student and an aspiring actress and model, were sitting in a car belonging to Esau's brother on the Hutchinson River Parkway service road in the Bronx, about a block from Suriani's home and only a few blocks away from the scene of the Lauria–Valenti shooting. A resident of a nearby building heard four shots and called police. Suriani, who was sitting in the driver's seat, was shot once and Esau twice, both in the head. Suriani died at the scene, and Esau died in the hospital several hours later without being able to describe his attacker(s). Police said the weapon used for the crime was the same as the one which they had suspected in the earlier shootings. Berkowitz confirmed in 1993 that he was the shooter.

=== Crime-scene letters (May) ===
==== Son of Sam letter ====
Police discovered a handwritten letter near the bodies of Esau and Suriani, written mostly in block capitals with a few lower-case letters, and addressed to NYPD Captain Joseph Borrelli. With this letter, Berkowitz identified himself as "Son of Sam" for the first time. The press had previously dubbed the perpetrator the ".44 Caliber Killer" because of his weapon of choice. The letter was initially withheld from the public, but some of its contents were revealed to the press and he quickly became known as the "Son of Sam".

The letter expressed the killer's determination to continue his work, and taunted police for their fruitless efforts to capture him. In full, with misspellings intact, the letter read:

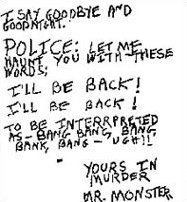
Final page of the first Son of Sam letter

I am deeply hurt by your calling me a wemon [sic] hater. I am not. But I am a monster. I am the "Son of Sam." I am a little "brat". When father Sam gets drunk he gets mean. He beats his family. Sometimes he ties me up to the back of the house. Other times he locks me in the garage. Sam loves to drink blood. "Go out and kill" commands father Sam. Behind our house some rest. Mostly young—raped and slaughtered—their blood drained—just bones now. Papa Sam keeps me locked in the attic, too. I can't get out but I look out the attic window and watch the world go by. I feel like an outsider. I am on a different wave length then everybody else—programmed too kill. However, to stop me you must kill me. Attention all police: Shoot me first—shoot to kill or else. Keep out of my way or you will die! Papa Sam is old now. He needs some blood to preserve his youth. He has had too many heart attacks. Too many heart attacks. "Ugh, me hoot it urts sonny boy." I miss my pretty princess most of all. She's resting in our ladies house but I'll see her soon. I am the "Monster"—"Beelzebub"—the "Chubby Behemouth." I love to hunt. Prowling the streets looking for fair game—tasty meat. The wemon of Queens are z prettyist of all. I must be the water they drink. I live for the hunt—my life. Blood for papa. Mr. Borrelli, sir, I dont want to kill anymore no sir, no more but I must, "honour thy father." I want to make love to the world. I love people. I don't belong on Earth. Return me to yahoos. To the people of Queens, I love you. And I wa want to wish all of you a happy Easter. May God bless you in this life and in the next and for now I say goodbye and goodnight. Police—Let me haunt you with these words; I'll be back! I'll be back! To be interrpreted as—bang, bang, bang, bank, bang—ugh!! Yours in murder Mr. Monster

At the time, police speculated the letter-writer might be familiar with Scottish English. The phrase "me hoot it urts sonny boy" was taken as a Scottish-accented version of "my heart, it hurts, sonny boy". Police also hypothesized the shooter blamed a dark-haired nurse for his father's death due to the "too many heart attacks" phrase, and the facts that Lauria was a medical technician and Valenti was studying to be a nurse.

The perpetrator's unusual attitude towards police and journalists received widespread scrutiny. Psychologists observed that many serial killers gain gratification by eluding pursuers and observers; the feeling of control over media, law enforcement and even entire populations provides a source of social power for them. After consulting with several psychiatrists, police released a psychological profile of their suspect on May 26, 1977. He was described as a "neurotic" who probably had paranoid schizophrenia and believed himself to be a victim of demonic possession.

==== Letter to Jimmy Breslin ====
On May 30, 1977, Daily News columnist Jimmy Breslin received a handwritten letter from someone who claimed to be the .44 Caliber Killer. The letter was postmarked early that same day in Englewood, New Jersey. On the reverse of the envelope, neatly hand-printed in four precisely centered lines, were the words: Blood and Family – Darkness and Death – Absolute Depravity – .44. The letter inside read:

Hello from the gutters of N.Y.C. which are filled with dog manure, vomit, stale wine, urine and blood. Hello from the sewers of N.Y.C. which swallow up these delicacies when they are washed away by the sweeper trucks. Hello from the cracks in the sidewalks of N.Y.C. and from the ants that dwell in these cracks and feed in the dried blood of the dead that has settled into the cracks. J.B., I'm just dropping you a line to let you know that I appreciate your interest in those recent and horrendous .44 killings. I also want to tell you that I read your column daily and I find it quite informative. Tell me Jim, what will you have for July twenty-ninth? You can forget about me if you like because I don't care for publicity. However you must not forget Donna Lauria and you cannot let the people forget her either. She was a very, very sweet girl but Sam's a thirsty lad and he won't let me stop killing until he gets his fill of blood. Mr. Breslin, sir, don't think that because you haven't heard from me for a while that I went to sleep. No, rather, I am still here. Like a spirit roaming the night. Thirsty, hungry, seldom stopping to rest; anxious to please Sam. I love my work. Now, the void has been filled. Perhaps we shall meet face to face someday or perhaps I will be blown away by cops with smoking .38's. Whatever, if I shall be fortunate enough to meet you I will tell you all about Sam if you like and I will introduce you to him. His name is "Sam the terrible." Not knowing what the future holds I shall say farewell and I will see you at the next job. Or should I say you will see my handiwork at the next job? Remember Ms. Lauria. Thank you. In their blood and from the gutter "Sam's creation" .44 Here are some names to help you along. Forward them to the inspector for use by N.C.I.C: "The Duke of Death" "The Wicked King Wicker" "The Twenty Two Disciples of Hell" "John 'Wheaties' – Rapist and Suffocator of Young Girls. PS: Please inform all the detectives working the slaying to remain. P.S: JB, Please inform all the detectives working the case that I wish them the best of luck. "Keep 'em digging, drive on, think positive, get off your butts, knock on coffins, etc." Upon my capture I promise to buy all the guys working the case a new pair of shoes if I can get up the money. Son of Sam

Underneath "Son of Sam" was a design that combined several symbols. The writer's question, "What will you have for July 29?" was considered an ominous threat: July 29 would be the anniversary of the Lauria-Valenti shooting. Breslin notified police, who thought the letter was probably from someone with knowledge of the shootings. The Breslin letter was sophisticated in its wording and presentation, especially when compared to the crudely written first letter, and police suspected it might have been created in an art studio or similar professional location by someone with expertise in printing, calligraphy or graphic design. The unusual all-capitals handwriting caused police to speculate the killer was a comic-book letterer, and they asked staff members of DC Comics whether they recognized the lettering. The "Wicked King Wicker" reference led police to arrange a private screening of the horror movie The Wicker Man (1973).

The Daily News published the letter a week later (agreeing with police to withhold portions of the text), and Breslin urged the killer to surrender. The dramatic article made that day's paper the highest-selling edition of the Daily News to date—more than 1.1 million copies were sold. Police received thousands of tips based on references in the publicized portions of the letter, all of which proved useless. As all of the shooting victims to date had long dark hair, thousands of women in New York City acquired short cuts or brightly colored dyes, and beauty supply stores had trouble meeting the demand for wigs.

=== Lupo and Placido shooting (June) ===
On June 26, 1977, Salvatore Lupo (20), a mechanic's helper, and Judy Placido (17), a recent high school graduate, had left the Elephas discotheque in Bayside, Queens, and were sitting in Lupo's parked car at about 3:00 a.m. when three gunshots blasted through the vehicle. Lupo was wounded in the right forearm, while Placido was shot in the right temple, shoulder and back of the neck; both victims survived their injuries. Lupo told police they had been discussing the Son of Sam case only moments before the shooting. Neither Lupo nor Placido had seen their attacker, but two witnesses reported a tall, dark-haired man in a leisure suit fleeing from the area; one claimed to see him leave in a car and even supplied a partial license plate number.

=== Moskowitz and Violante shooting (July) ===
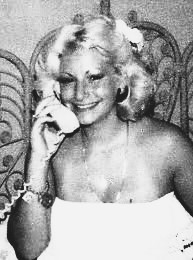
Stacy Moskowitz

With the first anniversary of the initial .44 caliber shootings approaching, police established a sizable dragnet that emphasized past hunting grounds in Queens and the Bronx. However, the next and final .44 shooting occurred in Brooklyn.

Early on July 31, 1977, secretary Stacy Moskowitz and clothing salesman Robert Violante (both 20) were sitting in Violante's car, which was parked under a streetlight near a city park in Bath Beach, on their first date. They were kissing when a man approached within three feet (90 cm) of the passenger side of the car and fired four rounds, striking both victims in the head before he escaped into the park. Violante lost his left eye; Moskowitz, the only blonde victim of Berkowitz, died from her injuries.

That night, Detective John Falotico was awakened at home and told to report to the 10th Homicide Division at the 60th Precinct station house in Coney Island. He was given two weeks to work on the Moskowitz—Violante case as a normal murder investigation; if it could not be solved in that timeframe, it was to be given to the Son of Sam task force.

== Suspicion and capture (August 1977) ==
=== Suspicion ===
Local resident Cacilia Davis was walking her dog at the scene of the Moskowitz—Violante shooting when she saw patrol officer Michael Cataneo ticketing a car parked near a fire hydrant. Moments after the traffic police had left, a young man walked past her from the area of the car and seemed to study her with some interest. Davis felt concerned because he was holding some kind of "dark object" in his hand. She ran to her home, only to hear shots fired behind her in the street. Davis remained silent about this experience for four days until she contacted police, who checked every car that had been ticketed in the area that night. Berkowitz's yellow 1970 Ford Galaxie was among the cars they investigated.

On August 9, 1977, NYPD detective James Justis telephoned the Yonkers Police Department to ask them to schedule an interview with Berkowitz. The Yonkers police dispatcher who took his call was Wheat Carr, who recognized Berkowitz's name and said, "Let me tell you about him. I know him. He lives right behind me." She told Justis that Berkowitz had shot and wounded a black Labrador Retriever belonging to her father, Sam Carr. When Justis heard "Sam", he had a strong feeling that Berkowitz was the person they'd been looking for. Wheat Carr's brothers John and Michael were later alleged to be cult confederates of Berkowitz.

Justis asked Yonkers police for help tracking down Berkowitz. According to Mike Novotny, a Yonkers police sergeant, the department had their own suspicions about Berkowitz in connection with strange crimes in their jurisdiction, referred to in one of the Son of Sam letters. Yonkers investigators told Justis that Berkowitz might be behind the killings.

=== Arrest ===
The following day, on August 10, 1977, police investigated Berkowitz's car, which was parked outside his apartment building at 35 Pine Street, Yonkers. They saw a handgun in the back seat, subsequently searched the car and found a duffel bag filled with ammunition, maps of the crime scenes and a threatening letter addressed to Inspector Timothy Dowd of the Son of Sam task force. Police waited for Berkowitz to leave the apartment rather than risk a violent confrontation in the building's narrow hallway; they also waited to obtain a search warrant for the apartment, worried their search might otherwise be challenged in court.

The initial search of the vehicle was based on the handgun visible in the back seat, although possession of such a gun was legal in New York State and required no special permit. The warrant still had not arrived when Berkowitz exited the apartment building at about 10:00 p.m. and entered his car. Detective John Falotico approached the driver's side of the car and pointed his gun close to Berkowitz's temple, while Detective Sgt. William Gardella pointed his gun from the passenger's side.

A paper bag containing a .44 caliber Bulldog revolver of the type identified in ballistics tests was found next to Berkowitz in the car. Berkowitz then stated flatly, "Well, you got me." As described in Son of Sam (1981) by Lawrence D. Klausner, Falotico remembered the big, inexplicable smile on the man's face:

"Now that I've got you", Detective Falotico said to the suspect, "who have I got?"

"You know," the man said in what the detective remembered was a soft, almost sweet voice.

"No I don't. You tell me."

The man turned his head and said, "I'm Sam."

"You're Sam? Sam who?"

"Sam. David Berkowitz."

An alternate version reports that Berkowitz's first words were, "Well, you got me. How come it took you such a long time?" Falotico was officially credited by the NYPD as Berkowitz's arresting officer. Police searched his apartment and found it in disarray, with Satanic graffiti on the walls. They also found diaries he had kept since he was aged 21—three stenographer's notebooks nearly all-full, wherein Berkowitz meticulously noted hundreds of fires throughout New York City. Berkowitz confessed he was also the "Phantom of the Bronx", an unidentified individual or individuals responsible for more than 2,000 arsons committed around the city throughout the 1970s.

Soon after Berkowitz's arrest, the address of the apartment building was changed from 35 Pine Street to 42 Pine Street in an attempt to end its notoriety. Berkowitz was briefly held in a Yonkers police station before being transported directly to the 60th Precinct in Coney Island, where the Son of Sam task force was located. At about 1:00 a.m., Mayor Beame arrived to see the suspect personally. After a brief and wordless encounter, he announced to the media: "The people of the City of New York can rest easy because of the fact that the police have captured a man whom they believe to be the Son of Sam."

=== Confession ===
Berkowitz was interrogated for about thirty minutes in the early morning of August 11, 1977. He quickly confessed to the shootings and expressed an interest in pleading guilty. The investigation was led by John Keenan, who took the confession. During questioning, Berkowitz claimed his neighbor's dog was one of the reasons he killed, stating the dog demanded the blood of pretty young girls. He said the "Sam" mentioned in the first letter was his former neighbor Sam Carr, and that Carr's black Labrador was possessed by an ancient demon which issued irresistible commands that Berkowitz kill people.

A few weeks after his capture, Berkowitz was permitted to communicate with the press. In a letter to the Post dated September 19, 1977, he alluded to his original story of demonic possession but closed with a warning interpreted by some investigators as an admission of criminal accomplices: "There are other Sons out there, God help the world." At a press conference in February 1979, however, Berkowitz declared his previous claims of demonic possession were a hoax. He later stated in a series of meetings with his special court-appointed psychiatrist, David Abrahamsen, that he had long contemplated murder to get revenge on a world he felt had rejected and hurt him. Berkowitz also told interrogators that he was planning to end his spree by "[going] down in a blaze of glory" at a Hamptons nightclub.

== Sentencing and incarceration ==
=== Sentencing ===
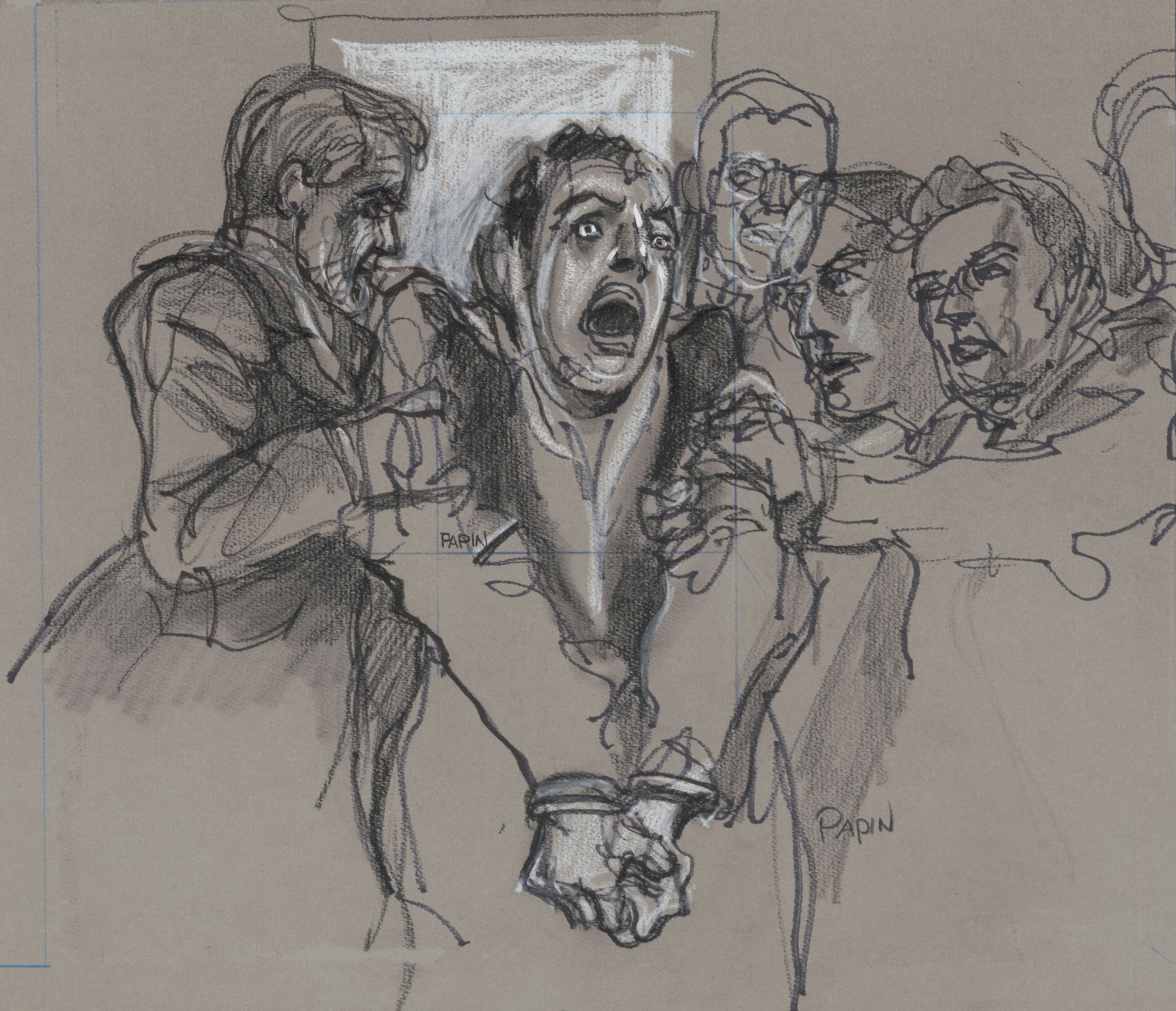
Courtroom sketch of guards struggling to drag Berkowitz from the courtroom while he shouts obscenities

Three mental health examinations determined Berkowitz was competent to stand trial. Despite this, defense lawyers advised him to enter a plea of not guilty by reason of insanity, but he refused. Berkowitz appeared calm in court on May 8, 1978, as he pleaded guilty to all of the shootings. At his sentencing two weeks later, Berkowitz caused an uproar when he attempted to jump out of a window of the seventh-floor courtroom. After he was restrained, he repeatedly chanted, "Stacy [his last victim] was a whore" and shouted, "I'd kill her again! I'd kill them all again!" The court ordered another psychiatric examination before sentencing could proceed. During the evaluation, Berkowitz drew a sketch of a jailed man surrounded by numerous walls; at the bottom he wrote, "I am not well. Not well at all." Nonetheless, Berkowitz was again found competent to stand trial.

On June 12, 1978, Berkowitz was sentenced to twenty-five-years-to-life in prison for each murder, to be served consecutively. He was ordered to serve time in Attica Correctional Facility, a maximum security prison in upstate New York. Despite prosecutors' objections, the terms of Berkowitz's guilty plea made him eligible for parole in twenty-five years.

=== Detention ===
After his arrest, Berkowitz was initially confined to a psychiatric ward in Kings County Hospital, where staff reported he seemed remarkably untroubled by his new environment. On the day after his sentencing, he was taken first to Sing Sing prison, then to Clinton Correctional Facility in Dannemora, New York, for psychiatric and physical examinations. Two more months were spent at the Central New York Psychiatric Center in Marcy before his admission to Attica prison. There, in 1979, an attempt was made on Berkowitz's life in which the left side of his neck was slashed from front to back, resulting in a wound that required more than fifty stitches to close. Berkowitz refused to identify his assailant, and he claimed only that he was grateful for the attack: it brought a sense of justice or, in Berkowitz's own words, "the punishment I deserve". However, Berkowitz later described his life in Attica as a "nightmare".

After the attack, for Berkowitz's own safety, he was held in solitary confinement in Attica. In 1981 he was moved to a new unit in Clinton Correctional Facility designed for inmates who cannot be kept in the general prison population. In 1987 he was moved to the general population at Sullivan Correctional Facility in Fallsburg, where he remained for many years. Later, he was transferred to Shawangunk Correctional Facility in Ulster County.

=== Evangelical faith ===
In 1987, Berkowitz claimed that he had become an evangelical Christian, reporting that his moment of conversion occurred after reading Psalm 34:6 from a Bible given to him by a fellow inmate. He expressed a wish to be referred to as the "Son of Hope" instead of "Son of Sam".

Soon after his imprisonment, Berkowitz invited Malachi Martin, an exorcist, to help him compose an autobiography, but the offer was not accepted. During later years, Berkowitz developed his memoirs with assistance from fellow evangelicals. His statements were released as a 1998 interview video Son of Hope, with a more extensive work released in book form, titled Son of Hope: The Prison Journals of David Berkowitz (2006). Berkowitz does not receive any royalties or profit from any sales of his works. He has continued to write essays on faith and repentance for evangelical websites.

A website is maintained on Berkowitz's behalf by a church group; like most prisoners in general, he is not allowed access to a computer. Berkowitz stays involved with prison ministry and regularly counsels troubled inmates. While in the Sullivan facility, he pursued education and graduated with honors from Sullivan Community College.

=== Parole hearings ===
Berkowitz is entitled to a parole hearing every two years as mandated by state law, though he has consistently refused to ask for his release, sometimes skipping the hearings altogether. Before his first parole hearing in 2002, Berkowitz sent a letter to New York Governor George Pataki requesting that it be canceled. He wrote, "In all honesty, I believe that I deserve to be in prison for the rest of my life. I have, with God's help, long ago come to terms with my situation and I have accepted my punishment." Officials at the Sullivan facility rejected his request.

At his 2016 hearing at Shawangunk, New York, Berkowitz stated that while parole was "unrealistic", he felt he had improved himself behind bars, adding: "I feel I am no risk, whatsoever." His lawyer, Mark Heller, noted that prison staff considered Berkowitz to be a "model prisoner". Despite this, commissioners denied parole. He was again denied parole at a twelfth hearing in May 2024. Ahead of this hearing, he acknowledged to the Post that he knew he had no chance of getting granted parole but still attended. "To not attend a hearing can be viewed as being defiant towards authority, and that's not me," Berkowitz said; he further added, "Most of all, I attend in order to openly apologize for my past crimes and to express my remorse." His next parole hearing was scheduled for May 2026.

=== Other activities ===
In 2002, during the D.C. sniper attacks, Berkowitz wrote a letter telling the sniper to "stop hurting innocent people." He made his comments in a three-page letter to Fox News personality Rita Cosby after she wrote to him seeking his comment on the attacks. During June 2005, Berkowitz sued one of his previous lawyers for the misappropriation of a large number of letters, photographs and other personal possessions. Hugo Harmatz, a New Jersey attorney, had represented Berkowitz in an earlier legal effort to prevent the National Enquirer from buying one of his letters. Harmatz then self-published his own collection of letters and memorabilia—Dear David (2005)—which he had obtained from Berkowitz during their consultations. Berkowitz stated that he would drop the lawsuit only if the attorney signed over all the money he made to the victims' families. In October 2006, Berkowitz and Harmatz settled out of court, with Harmatz agreeing to return the disputed items and to donate part of his book profits to the New York State Crime Victims Board.

== Satanic cult accomplice claims ==
In 1979, Berkowitz mailed a book about witchcraft to police in North Dakota. He had underlined several passages and written a few marginal notes, including the phrase: "Arliss [sic] Perry, Hunted, Stalked and Slain. Followed to Calif. Stanford University." The reference was to Arlis Perry, a nineteen-year-old North Dakota newlywed who had been murdered at Stanford on October 12, 1974. Her death, and the notorious abuse of her corpse in a chapel on campus, was a widely reported case. Berkowitz mentioned the Perry attack in other letters, suggesting that he knew details of it from the perpetrator himself. Local police investigators interviewed him but by 2004 had concluded he had "nothing of value to offer." The Perry case was solved in 2018, with the perpetrator, Stanford security guard Stephen Blake Crawford, having no known connection to Berkowitz.

After his admission to Sullivan prison, Berkowitz began to claim that he had joined a Satanic cult in the spring of 1975. In 1993, he made these claims known when he announced to the press that he had killed only three of the Son of Sam victims: Lauria, Esau, and Suriani. In his revised version of the events, Berkowitz claimed that other shooters were involved and that he had only been the gunman in the Lauria—Valenti and Esau—Suriani attacks. He said that he and several other cult members were involved in every incident by planning the events, providing early surveillance of the victims and acting as lookouts and getaway drivers at the murder scenes. Berkowitz stated that he could not divulge the names of most of his accomplices without putting his family directly at risk.

Among Berkowitz's alleged unnamed associates was a female cult member who he claims fired the gun at Denaro and Keenan; Berkowitz attributed their survival to the alleged accomplice's unfamiliarity with the powerful recoil of a Bulldog revolver. He declared that "at least five" cult members were at the scene of the Freund–Diel shooting, but the actual shooter was a prominent cult associate who had been brought in from outside New York with an unspecified motive—a cult member whom he identified only by his nickname, "Manson II". Another unnamed person was the gunman in the Moskowitz–Violante case, a male cult member who had arrived from North Dakota for the occasion, also without explanation.

Berkowitz did name two of the alleged cult members: John and Michael Carr. The two men were sons of the dog-owner Sam Carr, and they lived on nearby Warburton Avenue. Both of these other "sons of Sam" were long dead: John had been killed in a shooting judged a suicide in North Dakota during 1978, and Michael had been in a fatal car accident in 1979. Berkowitz claimed that the perpetrator of the DeMasi–Lomino shooting was John, and added that a Yonkers police officer, also a cult member, was involved in this crime. He claimed that Michael fired the shots at Lupo and Placido. Author Maurice Terry wrote that Michael was an active member of the Church of Scientology and noted that Berkowitz had been in possession of a list of telephone numbers—including the number for the Fort Harrison Hotel, the church's spiritual headquarters in Clearwater, Florida—at the time of his arrest. In a video interview posted in 2016, Berkowitz said he had been influenced by reading literature from the Process Church of the Final Judgement.

=== Competing ideas ===
Journalist John Hockenberry asserted that, even apart from the Satanic cult claims, some officials doubted the single-shooter theory, writing:

"What most don't know about the Son of Sam case is that from the beginning, not everyone bought the idea that Berkowitz acted alone."

John Santucci, the Queens district attorney at the time of the killings, and police investigator Mike Novotny both expressed their convictions that Berkowitz had accomplices. NYPD officer Richard Johnson, involved in the original investigation, opined that unresolved discrepancies in statements from witnesses and surviving victims indicate Berkowitz did not act alone:

"Why are there three [suspect] cars, five different [suspect] descriptions, different heights, different shapes, different sizes of the perpetrator? Somebody else was there."

Other contemporaries voiced their belief in the Satanic cult theory, including Donna Lauria's father. Berkowitz survivor Carl Denaro stated his opinion that "more than one person was involved" but admitted he could not prove the cult theory. His conclusion rests on his criticism of Berkowitz's statement to police as "totally false."

Diel's recollection is that he physically bumped into Berkowitz outside the Wine Gallery restaurant as he and Freund departed and walked to his car where the shooting occurred; Berkowitz, in contrast, told police that he passed within a few feet of Diel and Freund shortly before they entered the car. Diel contends he and Freund passed no one on their way to the car, and that the position of the car parked at the curb would have made it impossible for Berkowitz to have sneaked up on them in the few minutes between their encounter outside the restaurant and the shooting at the car; Diel thus reasons he was shot by someone other than Berkowitz.

Journalist Maury Terry published a series of investigative articles for Gannett newspapers in 1979 which challenged the official finding of a lone gunman in the Son of Sam case. Largely impelled by reports of accomplices and Satanic cult activity, the Son of Sam case was reopened by Yonkers police during 1996, but no new charges were filed. Due to a lack of findings, the investigation was eventually suspended but remains open.

=== Skeptics ===
Berkowitz's later claims about having been in a Satanic cult were widely dismissed. Breslin rejected his story of Satanic cult accomplices, stating that "when they talked to David Berkowitz that night, he recalled everything step by step by step. The guy has 1,000 percent recall and that's it. He's the guy and there's nothing else to look at." Other skeptics included former FBI profiler John Edward Douglas, who spent hours interviewing Berkowitz and concluded he was an "introverted loner, not capable of being involved in group activity." NYPD psychologist Dr. Harvey Schlossberg stated in Against The Law, a documentary about the Son of Sam case, that he believes that the Satanic cult claims are nothing but a fantasy concocted by Berkowitz to absolve himself of guilt. In his book Hunting Humans (2001), Elliott Leyton argued that "recent journalistic attempts to abridge—or even deny—Berkowitz's guilt have lacked all credibility."

== Legacy ==
Decades after his arrest, the name "Son of Sam" remains widely recognized as that of a notorious serial killer, with popular culture manifestations perpetuating this. Berkowitz himself continues to express remorse on Christian websites and on more mainstream news, including speaking out against gun violence and instead spreading the message to "take the glory out of guns".

Neysa Moskowitz, who previously had not hidden her hatred of Berkowitz, wrote him a letter shortly before her own death in 2006, forgiving him for killing her daughter, Stacy. Moskowitz lost all her children at young ages (Jody, aged 9, in a possible suicide in 1968; Stacy; and Ricky, aged 37, in 1999 of scleroderma).

=== Legal effects ===
After rampant speculation about publishers offering Berkowitz large sums of money for his story, the New York State Legislature swiftly passed a new law that prevented convicted criminals (and their relatives) from making any financial profit from books, movies or other enterprises related to the stories of their crimes. The United States Supreme Court struck down the so-called "Son of Sam law" for violating the First Amendment's right of free expression in the 1991 case of Simon & Schuster, Inc. v. Crime Victims Board, but New York produced a constitutionally revised version of the law in the following year. Similar laws have since been enacted in forty-one states and at the federal level.

=== In popular culture ===
==== Literature ====
Breslin, in collaboration with writer Dick Schaap, published a novelized account of the murders, .44 (1978), less than a year after Berkowitz's arrest. The highly fictionalized plot recounts the exploits of a Berkowitz-based character dubbed "Bernard Rosenfeld." Outside of North America, the book was renamed Son of Sam.

The 2016 young adult novel Burn Baby Burn by Meg Medina is set in New York City during 1977, and depicts how fear of being one of the Son of Sam victims affected the daily lives of people. He is also referred to by Lee Child in his Jack Reacher novella High Heat (2013).

==== TV and film ====
The Spike Lee drama Summer of Sam was released in 1999, with actor Michael Badalucco in the role of Berkowitz. The film depicts the tensions that develop in a Bronx neighborhood during the shootings, and Berkowitz's part is largely symbolic. A minor character in the script, he functions "mostly as a berserk metaphor for Lee's view of the seventies as a period of amoral excess." Berkowitz was reported to be disturbed by what he called exploitation of "the ugliness of the past" in Lee's film.

Other movie portrayals of Berkowitz include Ulli Lommel's Son of Sam (2008; direct-to-video) and the CBS television movie Out of the Darkness (1985). The character of Son of Sam played a significant minor role in the miniseries The Bronx Is Burning (2007), played by Paul Marini. Oliver Cooper portrayed him in the TV series Mindhunter (2019). In 2021, Netflix released documentary series The Sons of Sam: A Descent Into Darkness, going back to describing in detail the Satanic cult theory as well as Maury Terry's investigations into the case.

In the Seinfeld episode "The Diplomat's Club," Kramer uses the mailbag of David Berkowitz, owned by Newman, as collateral for a bet on airplane arrival times. In another Seinfeld episode, "The Frogger," Kramer proposes the name "Son of Dad" as a nickname for a serial killer called The Lopper, a reference to Berkowitz's nickname "Son of Sam." In the Seinfeld episode "The Junk Mail," Jerry's friend Frankie finds George in Jerry's van and says through the closed driver's side window, "Seinfeld's van!" George mistakes this for "Son of Sam!" and exclaims, "I knew it wasn't Berkowitz!" In the episode "The Engagement" Newman says, when the police arrive to arrest him, "What took you so long?", echoing Berkowitz.

In the Only Murders in the Building episode "The Tell", several characters play a card game created for the television show called "Son of Sam". This game is similar to the party game Mafia, where one player is assigned the role of a killer, in this case the Son of Sam, who eliminates other players over a series of rounds. Each round, the other players have the opportunity to try to guess who is the Son of Sam.

==== Music ====
Son of Sam has been mistakenly associated with the contemporaneous song "Psycho Killer" (1977) by Talking Heads. Likewise, Elliott Smith stated that his song "Son of Sam" is not literally about Berkowitz, a claim some have found hard to believe due to the song's lyrics. Compositions more directly inspired by the events include:

- "Son of Sam" (1978) by the Dead Boys
- "Son of Sam" by Chain Gang
- "Looking Down the Barrel of a Gun" (1989) by the Beastie Boys

Todd Rundgren mentioned the Son of Sam on his song "Bag Lady" from his 1978 album Hermit of Mink Hollow. Billy Joel mentioned these events in the opening line of his song "Close to the Borderline" on his 1980 album Glass Houses. Hall & Oates referenced Berkowitz on their 1980 song "Diddy Doo Wop (I Hear the Voices)". Guitarist Scott Putesky used the stage name "Daisy Berkowitz" while playing with Marilyn Manson in the 1990s, and the band's song "Son of Man" conspicuously describes Berkowitz. The hip-hop song Insane in the Brain by Cypress Hill from 1993 references Berkowitz in the lyric "Damn, I feel like the Son of Sam". Several other rock musicians established a full ensemble named Son of Sam during 2000. Shinedown included a song called "Son of Sam" on their 2008 album The Sound of Madness. A cartoon composite of Berkowitz and the breakfast cereal icon Toucan Sam was featured in Green Jellÿ's comedy-rock video Cereal Killer (1992) by the name of "Toucan Son of Sam," but it was later removed under threat of a copyright lawsuit by the Kellogg Company. In 2016, rapper Lucki released an EP titled Son of Sam, which featured a cover taken from the final page of Berkowitz's first letter.

== See also ==
- List of serial killers by number of victims
- List of serial killers in the United States

== Bibliography ==
- Abrahamsen, David (1985). Confessions of Son of Sam. New York: Columbia University Press. ISBN 0-231-05760-1.
- Ewing, Charles Patrick (2008). Insanity: Murder, madness, and the law. New York: Oxford University Press. ISBN 978-0195326130.
- Foreman, Laura (1992). Serial Killers: True Crime (hardcover ed.). Virginia: Time-Life Books. ISBN 978-0-7835-0001-0.
- Gibson, Dirk C. (2010). Clues from Killers: Serial Murder and Crime Scene Messages. Westport, CT: Praeger. p. 13. ISBN 978-0-275-98360-4. Archived from the original on February 2, 2017 – via Questia.
- Guiley, Rosemary Ellen (2009). The Encyclopedia of Demons and Demonology. Infobase Publishing. ISBN 978-1-4381-3191-7.
- Harmening, William M. (2014). Serial Killers: The Psychosocial Development of Humanity's Worst Offenders. Springfield, IL: Charles C. Thomas Publisher Ltd. ISBN 978-0398081140.
- Klausner, Lawrence D. (1981). Son of Sam: Based on the Authorized Transcription of the Tapes, Official Documents and Diaries of David Berkowitz. New York: McGraw-Hill. ISBN 0-07-035027-2.
- Leyton, Elliot (2001). Hunting Humans: The rise of the modern multiple murderer. New York: Carroll & Graf. ISBN 0-7867-1228-7.
- Mahler, Jonathan (2006). Ladies and Gentlemen, the Bronx is Burning: 1977, baseball, politics, and the battle for the soul of a city. New York: Picador. ISBN 0-312-42430-2.
- Mayo, Mike (2008). American Murder: Criminals, Crimes and the Media. Canton, MI: Visible Ink Press. ISBN 978-1-57859-191-6.
- Pomerance, Murray (2007). City That Never Sleeps: New York and the filmic imagination. New Brunswick, NJ: Rutgers University Press. ISBN 978-0-8135-4032-0. Archived from the original on February 2, 2017 – via Questia.
- Ramsland, Katherine (2005). The Human Predator. The Berkley Group. ISBN 978-0425213780.
- Rossmo, D. Kim (1999). Geographic Profiling. Boca Raton, FL: CRC. ISBN 1420048783.
- Scott, Gini Graham (2007). American Murder. Westport, CT: Praeger. ISBN 978-0-313-02476-4.
- Sifakis, Carl (2002). The Encyclopedia of American Prisons. Infobase Publishing. ISBN 978-1-4381-2987-7.
- Terry, Maury (1987). The Ultimate Evil: An investigation into America's most dangerous satanic cult. New York: Doubleday. ISBN 0-385-23452-X – via Internet Archive (archive.org).
- Terry, Maury (1999). The Ultimate Evil: The truth about the cult murders: Son of Sam & beyond. New York: Barnes & Noble Books. ISBN 978-0-7607-1393-8.
- Wahl, Otto F. (1997). Media Madness: Public images of mental illness. Rutgers University Press. ISBN 978-0-8135-2213-5.
- Walker, Tom (2011). Return to Fort Apache: Memoir of an NYPD captain. Bloomington, IN: iUniverse. ISBN 978-1462020508.
