= Bruce D. Perry =

American psychiatrist

- Born: 1955 (age 70–71); Bismarck, North Dakota, U.S.
- Citizenship: United States
- Education: Northwestern University
- Spouse: Arlis Perry (m. 1974; died 1974)
- Scientific career
- Fields: Neuroscience, mental health, trauma
- Workplaces: Baylor College of Medicine

Bruce D. Perry is an American psychiatrist, currently the senior fellow of the Child Trauma Academy in Houston, Texas, and an adjunct professor of psychiatry and behavioral sciences at the Feinberg School of Medicine in Chicago. A clinician and researcher in children's mental health and the neurosciences, from 1993 to 2001 he was the Thomas S. Trammell Research Professor of Psychiatry at Baylor College of Medicine and chief of psychiatry at Texas Children's Hospital. He is also the author of several books.

== Early life and education ==
Perry was born in 1955 in Bismarck, North Dakota, the second of four children. His father, Duncan Richard Perry, was a dentist, and his mother, Donna (née Henry) Perry, a homemaker. Perry attended Amherst College in Amherst, Massachusetts, but did not graduate. He took classes that interested him but did not fulfill requirements for a bachelor's degree. Even without a bachelor's degree, he earned an M.D. and Ph.D. at Northwestern University. He completed a residency, from 1984 through 1987, in psychiatry at Yale University School of Medicine. In 1987, Perry had a fellowship in Child and Adolescent Psychiatry at the University of Chicago.

== Career ==
Perry has served as a consultant and expert witness on many high-profile incidents involving traumatized children, including the Columbine High School massacre, the Oklahoma City bombing, the Waco siege, and the YFZ Ranch custody cases. He is one of the leads of The Child Trauma Academy (CTA) in Houston. His clinical research and practice focus on examining the long-term effects of trauma in children, adolescents, and adults and have been instrumental in describing how traumatic events in childhood change the biology of the brain. He is the author of more than 200 journal articles, book chapters, and scientific proceedings and is the recipient of a variety of professional awards. Perry's Neurosequential Model of Therapeutics is currently the working model used by Youthville's Trauma Recovery Center in Wichita, Kansas.

=== Position on ADHD ===
Perry contends that attention deficit hyperactivity disorder (ADHD) is not "a real disease... It is best thought of as a description. If you look at how you end up with that label, it is remarkable because any one of us at any given time would fit at least a couple of those criteria."

== Publications ==
=== Books ===
- The Boy Who Was Raised As A Dog: What Traumatized Children Can Teach Us About Loss, Love and Healing, with Maia Szalavitz, 2007, ISBN 0-465-05652-0
- Born for Love: Why Empathy is Essential --and Endangered, with Maia Szalavitz, 2010, ISBN 0-06-165678-X
- What Happened to You? Conversations on Trauma, Resilience and Healing, with Oprah Winfrey, 2021, ISBN 978-1529068467

== Personal life ==
Perry's newlywed wife, Arlis Perry, was found murdered in Stanford Memorial Church on the grounds of Stanford University in California on October 12, 1974. Dr. Perry was initially considered a suspect but was released as he passed a lie detector test, his fingerprints did not match those on the candle used by the killer, and the blood stains visible on his shirt were said not to match his wife's blood.

In 2018, Stephen Crawford, a former campus security guard, previously described as having passed a lie detector test (while a 2018 article says he did not take one) and having fingerprints not matching those on the candle, was reportedly identified as the perpetrator based on a sample of DNA taken from his clothing. Crawford died of a gunshot wound, reportedly self-inflicted, when the police came to his apartment to serve a search warrant.
