= David Abrahamsen =

Norwegian forensic psychiatrist, psychoanalyst, author

- Born: June 23, 1903; Trondheim, Norway
- Died: May 20, 2002 (aged 98)
- Education: Royal Frederick University (University of Oslo)
- Known for: Analyses of Richard Nixon, David Berkowitz, and Jack the Ripper
- Notable work: I Am a Jew, Confessions of Son of Sam, Murder and Madness: Secret Life of Jack the Ripper
- Children: Inger McCabe Elliott
- Scientific career
- Fields: Forensic psychiatry, psychoanalysis
- Institutions: Tavistock Clinic; London School of Economics; St. Elizabeth's Hospital; Illinois State Penitentiary; Sing Sing Correctional Facility; New York State Psychiatric Institute; Columbia University

David Abrahamsen (June 23, 1903 – May 20, 2002) was a Norwegian forensic psychiatrist, psychoanalyst, and author who wrote analyses of Richard M. Nixon and David Berkowitz.

He was the father of Inger McCabe Elliott.

== Early life and education ==
Abrahamsen was born in Trondheim, Norway in 1903. He studied medical science at the Royal Frederick University in Oslo and graduated in 1929. He eventually relocated to England, taking positions at the Tavistock Clinic and the London School of Economics.

He moved to the United States in 1940 and joined the staff at St. Elizabeth's Hospital in Washington, D.C. Later he served as a psychiatrist and criminal psychopathologist at two major prisons in the U.S., first the Illinois State Penitentiary in Joliet, and then the Sing Sing Correctional Facility in Ossining, New York. He also worked for the New York State Psychiatric Institute at Columbia University, and served as a teacher and research associate at Columbia's College of Physicians and Surgeons.

== Writing career ==
Abrahamsen belonged to one of the oldest families of Jewish settlers in Norway, and his heritage informed the writing of his first book, I Am a Jew, which described and compared the traditional Norwegian and Jewish ways of life.

Abrahamsen's paper, A Study of Lee Harvey Oswald: Psychological Capability of Murder, was published in the Bulletin of the New York Academy of Medicine, in October 1967. His book, Our Violent Society, came out in 1970, a Funk & Wagnalls' publication.

Abrahamsen's expertise in psychopathology was enlisted by authorities during the notorious Son of Sam serial murder case: when the killer, David Berkowitz, was finally in custody, Abrahamsen was directed by the Brooklyn District Attorney to evaluate his ability to stand trial. He deemed him competent, but Berkowitz never went to trial, pleading guilty instead and receiving multiple life sentences. Abrahamsen continued to examine Berkowitz in jail, and ultimately documented his life in Confessions of Son of Sam (1985).

Abrahamsen suspected Prince Albert Victor and James Kenneth Stephen worked as a collaborating team to commit the Jack the Ripper murders. The book was criticized for providing no solid evidence.

Columbia University Library maintains a trove of research notes, drafts, correspondence and articles written by Abrahamsen on topics of criminals and criminality.

== Publications ==
- Crime and the Human Mind (1944)
- The Mind and Death of a Genius (1946) (about Otto Weininger)
- The Psychology of Crime (1967)
- Our Violent Society (1970)
- The Murdering Mind (1973)
- Nixon Vs. Nixon: An Emotional Tragedy (1977)
- The Mind of the Accused: A Psychiatrist in the Courtroom (1983)
- Confessions of Son of Sam (1985)
- Murder and Madness: Secret Life of Jack the Ripper (1994)
