= The Killing Season (American TV series) =

Television series

- Genre: Documentary; True crime
- Directed by: Joshua Zeman
- Starring: Joshua Zeman; Rachel Mills
- Country of origin: United States
- Original language: English
- No. of seasons: 1
- No. of episodes: 8

Production
- Executive producers: Alex Gibney; Joshua Zeman; Rachel Mills; Stacey Offman; Dave Snyder
- Production location: United States
- Camera setup: Multi-camera; Handheld HDV cameras
- Running time: 42 minutes
- Production companies: Jigsaw Productions; Gigantic Pictures

Original release
- Network: A&E
- Release: November 12 – December 3, 2016

The Killing Season is an American true crime documentary television series which debuted on November 12, 2016, on A&E. Executive produced by Alex Gibney, the series follows documentarians Joshua Zeman and Rachel Mills as they explore the case of the Long Island serial killer and other unsolved cases such as the Eastbound Strangler, and the victims and investigations that have been connected to the cases. Some new investigating and interviewing is done during the series, including contacting members of internet amateur crime investigation group Websleuths.com, and following-up on their activities.

Series producers found sex worker serial killings to be a bigger problem than they expected and they look for obstacles that law enforcement has in solving the murders.

== Production ==
A&E announced in September 2016 that the series would premiere on November 5, 2016, however the premiere was later delayed by one week. The theme music for the series is the 1979 recording of "Bela Lugosi's Dead" by Bauhaus.

== Reception ==
The Killing Season has received generally positive reviews from critics. On Metacritic, it has a score of 63 out of 100 based on four reviews.

== Episodes ==
No.	Title	Original release date	US viewers (millions)
1	"Whoever Fears Monsters"	November 12, 2016	0.472
Four dead bodies with red-painted toenails wrapped in burlap. Who are they and how did they get here?
2	"The Most Dangerous Game"	November 12, 2016	0.432
More bodies in Long Island. Questions about how many killers are involved and are they sending messages to each other or competing for the same territory?
3	"Danse Macabre"	November 19, 2016	0.535
Producers visit Atlantic City, NJ to investigate a similar case.
4	"A Darkness on the Edge of Town"	November 19, 2016	0.529
The body count of sex-workers rises and the show looks at more victims and suspects and law enforcement in New Jersey and Daytona Beach Florida.
5	"Different Seasons"	November 26, 2016	0.428
Josh and Rachel are in Florida looking into the case of the Daytona Beach Serial Killer.
6	"A Killer on the Road"	November 26, 2016	0.519
After a private investigator's alarming revelation that there exists long haul truckers moonlighting as serial killers terrorizing America's interstate system.
7	"Wasteland"	December 3, 2016	0.478
Discovering that the current systems in place to detect serial killers are severely broken, and suffering from an inability to connect the dots.
8	"American Nightmare"	December 3, 2016	0.480
With the help of local advocates and ex-FBI, Rachel and Josh search for eight missing women on Albuquerque's West Mesa when they discover they may be dealing with something even more sinister than a lone serial killer.

== See also ==
- Murder of Tanya Jackson
