= Ghost Robot =

American creative studio

Ghost Robot, Inc.
- Industry: Media production
- Founded: 2002
- Founder: Zachary Mortensen; Mark De Pace
- Headquarters: New York City
- Area served: Worldwide
- Website: ghostrobot.com

Ghost Robot is a creative content studio based in Williamsburg, Brooklyn, New York, United States. The company produces projects in a variety of media.

== History ==
Ghost Robot was founded in 2002 by Zachary Mortensen. The company derived its name from the theme of a music video Ghost Robot was producing at the time. The video was for the song "In The Waiting Line" by the band Zero7, directed by Tommy Pallotta. "In The Waiting Line" was the first commercial use of machinima using the animation engine from the Quake video game. The video won awards at the first Academy of Machinima Arts and Sciences awards ceremony at the Museum of Moving The Image in New York City.

In 2005 Mark De Pace joined the company as a full partner and spearheaded the formation of the company's roster of directors for commercial representation. The addition of De Pace repositioned the company within the industry and began their official move into advertising and commercial production.

== Music videos ==
Ghost Robot established its position in the industry with the production of music videos. Notable productions include RJD2’s “Work It Out” which features a performance by dancer and artist Bill Shannon, shot in one take on the streets of New York City. The video was featured in the Saatchi New Directors Showcase in Cannes.

In 2008 Ghost Robot produced the music video "Wanderlust" for Björk. The video was directed by long-time Ghost Robot collaborators Isaiah Saxon and Sean Hellfritsch of Encyclopedia Pictura in New York City in stereoscopic 3D. The video involves a mixture of large scale puppeteering, live-action acrobatics, miniatures, and CG. The video took nine months to complete and required the creation of a custom-built 3d camera and playback system.

== Entertainment ==
Partners Zachary Mortensen and Mark De Pace, both graduates of NYU Film School, began their careers in independent film in New York City. Ghost Robot has produced feature films, documentary films, and comic books. In 2008 the company produced Against the Current, which premiered at Sundance Film Festival.

Benjamin Dickinson directed Ghost Robot's feature film Creative Control, which had its world premiere at South by Southwest on March 14, 2015. It was released on March 11, 2016, by Amazon Studios and Magnolia Pictures.

In 2014 Ghost Robot launched its first comic book with the publication of The Gatecrashers: A Night of Gatecrashing. The book found critical acclaim and continues as an ongoing comic series.

== Branded content ==
Ghost Robot produces advertising and branded content for international brands, including for the relaunch of the 2013 Ford Fusion.
