= The Sons of Sam: A Descent Into Darkness =

2021 American TV series

- Genre: Documentary
- Directed by: Joshua Zeman
- Starring: Paul Giamatti; Phil Amicone; Charlie Ott
- Country of origin: United States
- Original language: English
- No. of seasons: 1
- No. of episodes: 4

Production
- Running time: 58–62 minutes

Original release
- Network: Netflix
- Release: May 5, 2021

The Sons of Sam: A Descent Into Darkness is a 2021 docuseries that premiered on Netflix on May 5, 2021. The show profiles Maury Terry, a journalist who spent 40 years trying to prove that the notorious serial killer David Berkowitz did not act alone. The series is directed by Joshua Zeman and features Paul Giamatti as the voice of Maury Terry.

== Plot ==
Maury Terry, an investigative journalist, made it his life's work to prove that Berkowitz, better known as "The Son of Sam," was not alone on his killing spree. Berkowitz is now serving a 300-year prison sentence for the shooting of 13 people and killing six between July 1976 and July 1977. He was the only one who was ever charged for these crimes, but Terry insisted that Berkowitz was acting on behalf of a satanic cult known as "The Children," which allegedly was connected to Charles Manson.

There were many guesses and theories for Terry's suspicions, which he detailed in his 1987 book The Ultimate Evil. The police sketches of the murderer based on eyewitness accounts did not resemble Berkowitz, and Berkowitz even alleged that he did not commit all of the Son of Sam murders himself and, as recently as 2020, that he was a member of a cult. Zeman recalls NYPD detectives saying off the record that they believed "Berkowitz did not act alone."

Zeman calls Terry "the last victim" of the murders because of the obsession with the case that consumed his life. He first met Terry during the making of his 2009 documentary Cropsey, and they discussed the case and Terry's convictions at length before Terry's death in 2015. The evidence that Terry left Zeman inspired the docuseries, as he explains in the first episode.

== Cast ==
- David Berkowitz
- Paul Giamatti as Maury Terry
- Phil Amicone
- Charlie Ott
- Michael Zuckerman
- Mary Murphy

== Episodes ==
No.	Title	Original release date
1	"Hello from the Gutters"	May 5, 2021
2	"Catch .44"	May 5, 2021
3	"The Ultimate Evil"	May 5, 2021
4	"Rabbit Hole"	May 5, 2021

== Reception ==
=== Critical response ===
On Rotten Tomatoes, the series holds an approval rating of 58% based on 19 reviews, with an average rating of 6.3/10. On Metacritic, the series holds a rating of 58 out of 100, based on 6 critics, indicating "mixed or average reviews".

In Decider, Joel Keller said the series "should put a new perspective on one of the most famous serial-killer cases of all time." Tony Sokol of Den of Geek called it "compelling, exquisitely inconclusive, and long overdue." Dan Jackson of Thrillist called the series' footage "startling" and "tense," and Nick Schager of The Daily Beast praised its "harrowing account of those stressful few months."

Richard Roeper of the Chicago Sun-Times wrote: "In the more than capable hands of director Joshua Zeman, "The Sons of Sam" becomes as much a profile of Terry's obsessive attempts to re-open the case... as a re-examination of the investigation of the ".44 Caliber Killer," as Berkowitz was called by the media until he began sending letters to New York Daily News columnist Jimmy Breslin calling himself "Son of Sam."

Screen Rant, however, criticized the inaccuracies and omissions about Berkowitz, Satanism and Terry's life after his interview with Berkowitz.

== Podcast ==
Netflix released a five-part companion podcast, Searching for the Sons of Sam alongside the docuseries.

== See also ==
- Joan Jett – sang her version of "Season of the Witch" which was used as the show's theme song
- Satanic panic
- MLK assassination – Terry reported an eyewitness account of the 1968 event which was denied by his publishers at IBM
