= Benjamin Dickinson =

American film director

- Born: Benjamin Gerrish Dickinson
- Occupations: Film director, screenwriter
- Notable work: Creative Control

Benjamin Gerrish Dickinson is an American film director, screenwriter, and actor.

== Career ==
Dickinson started as a music video director, a member of Waverly Films collective. He was shooting for LCD Soundsystem, Q-Tip, Reggie Watts, Killer Mike, and Yoko Ono. His debut feature, First Winter, was released in 2012.

In 2015 he directed a VR short Waves, screened at Sundance to a positive response from audience.

His second feature, brought him a Special Jury Prize at the 2015 SXSW Film Festival. The sci-fi movie shot in BW was praised by critics for strong visuals.

== Filmography ==
- 2021 – White devil (short);
- 2015 – Creative Control;
- 2014 – Super Sleuths (short);
- 2012 – First winter;
- 2008 – The Scariest Show on Television (TV movie).
