= Andre Rand =

American kidnapper, sex offender, and suspected serial killer (born 1944)

- Born: Frank Rostum Rushan; March 11, 1944 (age 82); New York, New York, U.S.
- Other names: The Pied Piper of Staten Island; Cropsey
- Status: Incarcerated
- Convictions: Sexual abuse (1969); Unlawful imprisonment (1983); First-degree kidnapping (1988, 2004)
- Criminal charges: Attempted rape (1969); First-degree kidnapping, first-degree murder (1988); First-degree kidnapping (2004)
- Penalty: 4 years in prison (1969); Ten months in jail (1983); 25 years to life in prison (1988, 2004)

Details
- Victims: 2 confirmed 6+ suspected
- Span of crimes: 1969–1987
- State: New York
- Locations: Staten Island and South Bronx (confirmed); Brooklyn (suspected)

Andre Rand (born Frank Rostum Rushan; March 11, 1944), also known as Frank Bruchette and dubbed the Pied Piper of Staten Island, is an American convicted child kidnapper, sex offender and suspected serial killer who is currently serving two sentences of twenty-five years to life in prison for the abductions of two girls, age 7 and 12, on Staten Island, New York. He is eligible for parole in 2037. Rand is the subject of the 2009 documentary Cropsey, which speculates that he may have been the source of an urban legend known by that name.

== Early life and criminal history ==
Rand was born Frank Rostum Rushan on March 11, 1944, in Manhattan. According to his younger sister in the 2009 documentary Cropsey, neither she nor her brother were sexually or physically abused as children. Rand's father died when Rand was aged 14, and his mother was institutionalized at Pilgrim Psychiatric Center in Brentwood, New York, where he and his sister would visit her. Between 1966 and 1968, using the name "Frank Bruchette", Rand worked as a custodian, orderly and physical therapy aide at Willowbrook State School, later renamed the Staten Island Development Center.

On May 5, 1969, Rand was arrested in the South Bronx for kidnapping and attempting to rape a nine-year-old girl, whom he had enticed into his car and driven to a vacant lot. Rand removed his clothes and hers, but a passing police car interrupted the crime. Charged with attempted rape, Rand pleaded guilty to sexual abuse and was sentenced to four years. He served sixteen months in prison, gaining parole in January 1972 and legally changing his name to Andre Rand. He logged three more arrests by the end of the decade for "minor" offenses, including burglary.

In 1979, Rand was accused of raping a young woman and a 15-year-old girl, but neither pressed charges. In 1983, while driving a school bus, Rand picked up a group of eleven children from a Staten Island YMCA, purchased a meal for them without the consent of any of their parents and took them to Newark Liberty International Airport. None of the children were harmed in this encounter, but Rand was apprehended and served ten months in jail for unlawful imprisonment.

== Suspected victims ==
On July 7, 1972, 5-year-old Alice Pereira vanished from the area around the Tysens Lane Apartments in the 600 block of Tysens Lane on Staten Island. Pereira was playing in the building's lobby with her brother and disappeared around 3:30 p.m. after he briefly left her alone. After that, Pereira might have been seen in a park close to the apartment complex in the New Dorp neighborhood. She has not been seen or heard from since. At 6:15 p.m., Pereira's mother reported her missing. At the time of her disappearance, Pereira's parents were divorced; the girl lived with her mother, and her father lived in Manhattan. Authorities initially believed Pereira's father had taken her, but he was later cleared as a suspect. Rand is the prime suspect in Pereira's case, as he worked as a painter in Tysens Lane Apartments at the time of the disappearance.

Audrey Lyn Nerenberg, 18, was last seen leaving her family's home in the Canarsie neighborhood of Brooklyn on July 5, 1977. Nerenberg had told her mother that she would be returning immediately after going two blocks to purchase cigarettes, but she has never been heard from again. Her hebephrenic schizophrenia had caused her to spend brief periods of time in several healthcare institutions in Manhattan, Brooklyn and Queens between 1974 and 1977; at the time of her disappearance, she was an outpatient at Kingsboro Psychiatric Center in Brooklyn. On July 4, 1977, the evening before she vanished, Nerenberg travelled with her family to Staten Island to see a movie at the former Jerry Lewis Theater on Forest Avenue, which was adjacent to a campsite that Rand had previously visited.

Ethel Louise Atwell, 42, was last seen October 24, 1978, at the Willowbrook State School, where she worked as a physical therapy assistant. At 6:00 a.m., before she could get from the parking lot into her building on the school's campus, two female employees heard a male voice outside say, "Come on, come on", and Atwell say, "No, you'll beat me." Atwell then screamed. The employees called police after hearing the screams. The parking lot was still dark, the streetlights were off and it was difficult for the employees to see anything. Items belonging to Atwell, including a tan pocketbook, one earring, one black shoe, three black coat buttons and part of her set of dentures were discovered by first responders along the left side of her locked car. About 75 feet (23 m) away in the woods, Atwell's car keys were discovered. No trace of Atwell has been found despite a thorough search of the area.

Shin Lee, 44, was a nurse who had gone missing earlier in 1978 from Willowbrook State School under similar circumstances to Atwell. She was reported missing on July 20 and was last seen walking home from the campus towards her home close to midnight. Lee was found murdered by strangulation and buried in a shallow grave near a wooded area on facility grounds on August 6, only two months prior to Atwell's disappearance. Atwell and Lee are suspected victims of Rand, though there is no concrete evidence linking him to either incident.

Holly Ann Hughes, 7, was last seen July 15, 1981, on Staten Island near Richmond Terrace and Park Avenue. Her mother sent her to the Port Richmond Deli two blocks away to purchase a bar of Ivory soap, and she was last seen buying it around 9:30 p.m. She never returned home and has never been heard from again. A month after Hughes' disappearance, her mother, Holly Cederholm, received a phone call from a man who identified himself as "Sal" who informed Cederholm that he was imprisoning the child and asked that they meet so that Cederholm could engage in sex acts for the camera in exchange for Hughes' safe return.

Cederholm went with detectives to meet Sal at Penn Station in New York City, but he never showed up. She stated that she never believed Sal really had Hughes; by this time, she thought Hughes was dead. In January 2002, authorities examined the yard of Rand's former Staten Island home on Vreeland Street, but they were unable to find any evidence pertaining to Hughes' case. Shortly after Hughes vanished, police questioned Rand and searched his car, but they did not prosecute him until twenty years later. Cederholm identified Rand's voice as the same voice she heard during the extortion phone call. Witnesses claimed to have seen Rand's green Volkswagen circle the business where Hughes vanished in 1981.

Witnesses saw Hughes in Rand's car. He acknowledged playing hide-and-seek with Hughes on the day she vanished and gave her money to buy soap because she was "filthy", but he claims to have left her before she vanished. Authorities also determined that Rand's aunt lived in the same Port Richmond apartment building where Hughes' family resided in 1981. Rand was convicted of kidnapping Hughes in October 2004. Rand was never charged with the child's murder due to a lack of evidence. He was sentenced to twenty-five years to life in prison. He is also serving twenty-five years to life for the Schweiger kidnapping. The second sentence made it extremely unlikely that he would ever be freed.

On August 14, 1983, twelve days after Rand was released from prison, 11-year-old Tiahease Jackson was last seen leaving the Mariners Harbor Motel on Forest Avenue in Staten Island. At 1:30 p.m., while Jackson's mother was asleep, another resident of the hotel sent Jackson out to purchase chicken wings from the Crown Supermarket in the 900 block of Richmond Avenue. Jackson never returned to the hotel and has never been heard from again. Her mother woke up at 4:30 p.m. and, discovering her daughter had been missing for three hours, immediately called police. Having both passed lie detector tests, Jackson's mother and uncle were ruled out as suspects in her disappearance. Andre Rand had a campsite at the Baron Hirsch Cemetery less than one-half mile (800 m) from the Mariners Harbor Motel, and Jackson's mother said she had seen a man matching his description loitering in the motel's parking lot. Although Rand was interrogated, no charges were filed.

Henry Gafforio, a 22-year-old native of Staten Island had gone out drinking on June 8, 1984. He first went to Mugs Away, but was declined service. After that, he went to the Spa Lounge in the Port Richmond neighbourhood and remained there until it closed at 4:00 a.m. Before going missing, he was spotted at the diner with Rand. Gafforio vanished without a trace. At 7:00 p.m., he was reported missing. Gafforio was described as being "slow" and had an intelligence quotient in the 70s. Gafforio lived with his parents and three brothers in the 90 block of Heberton Avenue, on the same block as Rand and just around the corner from Hughes' residence. His body has never been found.

12-year-old Jennifer Schweiger, born with Down syndrome, was reported missing on July 9, 1987. Witnesses spotted Schweiger walking with Rand. Her body was found underground after a 35-day search. While combing the area around Willowbrook State School, a particular spot caught the eye of retired New York City firefighter George Kramer. He returned with the police, the entire body was unearthed from the shallow grave, and the remains were positively identified as those of Schweiger. Police searched the grounds for evidence and found one of Rand's makeshift campsites in proximity to Schweiger's grave.

== Convictions ==
In 1988, Rand was charged with the kidnapping and first-degree murder of Schweiger. The Staten Island jury could not reach a verdict on the murder charge, but convicted Rand of the first-degree kidnapping charge. He was sentenced to twenty-five years to life in prison. He would have been eligible for parole in 2008 if not convicted of a second kidnapping. According to the documentary Cropsey, some people along with detectives speculated that Rand may have been involved with Satanism and provided the children to be sacrificed.

Officers and inmates at the prison where Rand is currently incarcerated testified regarding conversations in which he allegedly bragged about his paedophiliac exploits. He reportedly confessed Hughes' murder to an inmate and compared himself to the serial killer Ted Bundy. In 2004, Rand was again brought to trial, this time charged with the 1981 kidnapping of Holly Ann Hughes. A jury convicted Rand of the kidnapping in October 2004 and he was sentenced to another consecutive twenty-five years to life in prison. He will become eligible for parole in 2037, when he will be 93.

== See also ==
- List of serial killers in the United States
