= Hell House (film) =

2002 film by George Ratliff

- Directed by: George Ratliff
- Produced by: Zachary Mortensen, Devorah DeVries
- Starring: Trinity Church Youth Group
- Cinematography: Jawad Metni
- Edited by: Michael LaHaie
- Music by: Matt and Bubba Kadane
- Release date: October 1, 2002
- Running time: 85 min
- Country: United States
- Language: English

Hell House is a 2002 documentary directed by George Ratliff. It focuses on one of many hell houses, Christian haunted attractions, located in Cedar Hill, Texas.

== Synopsis ==
The film follows the youth group of the Cedar Hill Trinity Church, documenting the work involved in creating the Hell house, the performances themselves, and the personal lives of some of the participants.

== Reception ==
The film holds a rating of 94% on review aggregator Rotten Tomatoes based on 34 reviews. A reviewer for the New York Times wrote, "Through such generalizations are destructive stereotypes born, on both the left and the right."

== Background ==
Ratliff, in an NPR interview, said the motivation for making the documentary was to display the Christian right in the United States. The documentary films the annual Halloween show at the Assemblies of God church. Ratliff said the Hell House was invented by this church and that it had been franchised all over the world.

The Assemblies of God's annual Hell House, on which the documentary film is based, is a "fire and brimstone"-style show with a concluding death scene followed by a trip to hell, followed by an invitation to the audience to accept Christ, thus saving their souls. Presentations during the show include a death scene due to HIV, an abortion, a school shooting, date rape, suicide, and a fatal drunk driving crash.
