= Elliott Leyton =

Canadian anthropologist (1939–2022)

Elliott Hastings Leyton
- Born: 21 August 1939; Leader, Saskatchewan, Canada
- Died: 4 February 2022 (aged 82); St. John's, Newfoundland, Canada

Academic background
- Education: B.A., M.A. University of British Columbia
- Alma mater: University of Toronto
- Thesis: Kinship and class in an Ulster village (1972)

Academic work
- Discipline: anthropology
- Institutions: Memorial University of Newfoundland
- Main interests: serial homicide
- Notable works: Hunting Humans

Elliott Leyton (August 21, 1939 – February 14, 2022) was a Canadian social-anthropologist, educator and author who, according to the CTV television news network, was amongst the most widely consulted experts on serial homicide worldwide.

== Biography ==
Leyton was born in Leader, Saskatchewan, on August 21, 1939. He earned B.A. and M.A. degrees from the University of British Columbia then went on to obtain his Ph.D. in anthropology from the University of Toronto in 1972. During his ensuing career, he dedicated himself to the analysis and research of social ills such as juvenile delinquency and the psychology behind perpetrators of serial killings. Leyton's achieved level of expertise has led to his giving lectures at the College of Royal Canadian Mounted Police (RCMP) in Ottawa. He was also a consultant on serial murder investigations for the RCMP, the FBI and Scotland Yard as well as for television shows and movies.

He held faculty positions at Queen's University of Belfast in Ireland (where he was a research Fellow), and at the University of Toronto, Toronto, Ontario; University of Warsaw, Warsaw, Poland; Hebrew University of Jerusalem in Israel; and at Memorial University of Newfoundland where he was latterly Professor Emeritus of anthropology.

Leyton served as president of the Canadian Sociology and Anthropology Association.

The author and editor of eleven books and numerous scholarly essays for academic journals, Leyton's 1986 landmark study Hunting Humans is an international bestseller in multiple languages that was reprinted in 1995 and again in 2005. It won the 1987 Arthur Ellis Award for best new crime book. Professor Leyton traveled to Rwanda in the fall of 1996 where he studied the Rwandan genocide that spawned his 1998 book, Touched By Fire: Doctors Without Borders in a Third World Crisis.

In 2004, a National Film Board of Canada film about Professor Leyton's life's work titled The Man Who Studies Murder, was premiered at the Montreal World Film Festival and aired on CBC Television’s The Nature of Things. Frequently consulted by the media, Professor Leyton was interviewed by CBC Newsworld on September 14, 2006 about the Dawson College shooting in Montreal. He stated that because all three such murderous rampages in Quebec involved a killer who was either an immigrant or a child of immigrants, it warranted an examination of government and societal attitudes that can profoundly impact immigrant perceptions and hence their conduct. The following day, Professor Leyton was the guest expert on CBC Radio One's program The Current that analyzed the 2006 Dawson College shooting.

Leyton wrote the foreword for Dance with the Devil: A Memoir of Murder and Loss, a book telling the story of the murder of Zachary Turner.

He died in St. John's, Newfoundland on February 14, 2022, at the age of 82.

== Books (partial list) ==
- Dying Hard (1975)
- The Myth of Delinquency (1979)
- Hunting Humans (1986, reprint: 1995) first US edition titled "Compulsive Killers"
- Sole Survivor (1990)
- Violence and public anxiety: A Canadian case (1992)
- Touched by Fire (with photographer Greg Locke) (1998)
- Serial Murder: Modern Scientific Perspectives (with Linda Chafe) (1999)
- Men of Blood (2002)
- Hunting Humans (revised and expanded edition)
