= Lynne Kelly (fiction writer) =

American writer

- Born: March 1, 1969 (age 57); Galesburg, Illinois, U.S.
- Education: Stephen F. Austin State University
- Occupations: Writer, Sign language interpreter
- Writing career
- Genres: Middle grade fiction, young adult fiction
- Notable awards: 2013 South Asia Book Award Honor, The Society of Children's Books Writers and Illustrator's Crystal Kite Award
- Website: lynnekellybooks.com

Lynne Kelly (born March 1, 1969) is an American author of books for children and young adults. Her first novel, Chained, was published in May 2012 by Farrar, Straus, & Giroux/Margaret Ferguson Books.

== Biography ==
Lynne Kelly is an author of middle grade and young adult fiction. She was born in Galesburg, Illinois and grew up in Houston, Texas. While studying for a psychology degree from Stephen F. Austin State University in Nacogdoches, she started working as a sign language interpreter and continued that career after graduation. Kelly became certified as a special education teacher in 2002, and started working on her first novel, Chained, while teaching in Spring ISD near Houston.

Kelly currently resides in the Houston, Texas area.

== Works ==
- Chained (2012, Farrar, Straus, & Giroux/Margaret Ferguson Books, ISBN 0-374-31237-0 / 2014, Penguin India and Bayard (France) / 2015, Suzuki Publishing (Japan))
- Song For a Whale (2019, Random House/Delacorte, ISBN 1-524-77023-X)
- The Secret Language of Birds (2024, Delacorte Press, ISBN 1-524-77027-2)
- Three Blue Hearts (forthcoming, Delacorte)

== Reception ==
Chained is a 2013 South Asia Book Award Honor and a recipient of the Society of Children's Books Writers and Illustrator's Crystal Kite Award. The book was reviewed in Kirkus, The Horn Book and School Library Journal.

== Awards ==
- 2013: South Asia Book Award Honor
- The Society of Children's Books Writers and Illustrator's Crystal Kite Award
