= Scrapple (film) =

- Directed by: Christopher Hanson
- Written by: Christopher Hanson; Geoffrey Hanson; George Plamondon
- Produced by: Geoffrey Hanson; George Plamondon
- Starring: Geoffrey Hanson; Ryan Massey; Buck Simmonds; Bunzy Bunworth
- Cinematography: Robert F. Smith
- Edited by: Adam Lichtenstein
- Music by: Taj Mahal
- Production company: Sweetwater Productions
- Distributed by: Tapeworm Video Distributors
- Release date: January 1998 (Slamdance Film Festival)
- Running time: 93 minutes
- Country: United States
- Language: English

Scrapple is a 1998 American comedy film directed by Christopher Hanson, starring Geoffrey Hanson, Ryan Massey, Buck Simmonds and Bunzy Bunworth.

== Cast ==
- Geoffrey Hanson as Al Dean
- Ryan Massey as Beth Muller
- Buck Simmonds as Tom Sullivan
- Bunzy Bunworth as Errol McNamara
- Jamey Jousan as Woody
- L. Kent Brown as Kurt Hinney
- Grady Lee as Phil Brandel
- George Plamondon as Cy Sloan
- Luc Leestemaker as Klauss
- Dan Earnshaw as Brian Dean
- Meredith Arnow as Kris Peechick
- Beth Childers as Sunshine
- Kevin Sheehan as Kevy Kev

== Release ==
The film premiered at the Slamdance Film Festival in January 1998.

== Reception ==
Brian Bertoldo of Film Threat wrote that the film is "wonderful" and "thoroughly entertaining".

TV Guide wrote, "Grainy look and some stiff performances aside, it's a charmer."

Dave Kehr of The New York Times called the film a "completely uncondescending, nearly letter-perfect re-creation of a late 60's-early 70's stoner comedy."

Marc Savlov of The Austin Chronicle wrote that the film is "less than the sum of its dazed and confused parts."
