= Hell house =

Evangelical Protestant haunted attraction

Hell houses are haunted house adaptions by evangelical Christian organizations that depict sinners and their horrible fate in Hell. Scenes portrayed may include date rape, same-sex marriage, gambling, abortion, extramarital sex, raving, drugs, and alcohol. They were most prominent during the late 1990s and 2000s. Other hell houses focus on the theme of the seven deadly sins. Hell houses typically emphasize the belief that those who do not repent of their sins and choose to follow Christ are condemned to Hell.

A Hell house, like a conventional haunted-house attraction, is a space set aside for actors to frighten patrons with gruesome exhibits and scenes, presented as a series of short vignettes with a narrated guide. Unlike haunted houses, Hell houses focus on real-life situations and the effects of sin or the fate of unrepentant sinners in the afterlife and often feature an altar call. They are most typically operated in the days preceding Halloween.

== History ==
The first known Hell house was set up by Jerry Falwell in Lynchburg, Virginia, beginning production in 1972. The attraction, called ScareMare, was backed by Falwell's Liberty University and features culture war issues appealing to the Moral Majority of the 1980s and the new Christian right. ScareMare continues annually as of 2025.

Hell houses and similar attractions such as Judgment houses, Revelation Walk, Rapture Walk, Tribulation Trail, and stage productions like Heaven's Gates, Hell's Flames became more common among conservative evangelical churches in the 1980s and 1990s. Trinity Assembly of God in Cedar Hill, Texas, is known to have presented a Hell house since 1990. Initially popular in the Southern and Western United States, events are now held throughout the United States and in other countries.

From 1995, the concept was promoted and adapted by Keenan Roberts, originally of Roswell, New Mexico, who started a Hell house in Arvada, Colorado. Since that time, Hell houses have become a regular fixture of the Halloween season in parts of the United States. Roberts remained active in the Hell house ministry by providing kits and directions to enable churches to perform their own attractions. As of 16 January 2017, the "Hell House Kit" was still available. As of 2023, a package of hell house scripts and scenes was being sold for $479.

In October 2000, documentary filmmaker George Ratliff filmed a production of a Hell house in Cedar Hill, Texas, from scripting to the final night of the production. The resulting documentary, Hell House, has inspired numerous live plays and hell-house performances, including one based on Pastor Roberts' production, which played for a month during the 2006 Halloween season in an off-Broadway production in Brooklyn, New York, by Les Freres Corbusier.
