= Maury Terry =

American journalist (1946–2015)

- Born: Maurice P. Terry; June 29, 1946
- Died: December 10, 2015 (aged 69)
- Education: Iona College
- Occupation: Journalist

Maurice P. Terry Sr. (June 29, 1946 – December 10, 2015) was an American journalist associated with investigating the Son of Sam killings.

== Early career ==
A graduate at Iona College, he worked as an in-house editor at IBM after his reports on the MLK assassination.

== The Ultimate Evil ==
He is known for writing the 1987 book , The Ultimate Evil, which posited that the Son of Sam murders involved a satanic cult of serial killers rather than only David Berkowitz. His preserved archives, audio tapes, and his book were used as the basis for the Netflix documentary series The Sons of Sam: A Descent Into Darkness.

== Death ==
After a short illness, Terry died from heart failure on 10th December 2015. He was survived by his parents and sister.

== See also ==
- Satanic panic
- Charles Manson
- Conspiracy theory
