= Cropsey (film) =

- Theatrical release poster
- Directed by: Joshua Zeman; Barbara Brancaccio
- Written by: Joshua Zeman
- Produced by: Joshua Zeman; Barbara Brancaccio; Zachary Mortensen
- Cinematography: Chad Davidson
- Edited by: Tom Patterson
- Music by: Alexander Lasarenko
- Production companies: Antidote Films; Afterhours Productions; Ghost Robot; Off Hollywood Pictures (in association)
- Distributed by: Cinema Purgatorio (theatrical); Breaking Glass Pictures (2011, DVD)
- Release date: June 4, 2009
- Running time: 84 minutes
- Country: United States
- Language: English

Cropsey is a 2009 American documentary film written and directed by Joshua Zeman and Barbara Brancaccio. The film initially begins as an examination of "Cropsey", a boogeyman-like figure from New York City urban legend, before segueing into the story of Andre Rand, a convicted child kidnapper from Staten Island whose known or suspected crimes in the 1970s and 1980s may have inspired or been blamed on Cropsey.

In 2009, Cropsey premiered at the Tribeca Film Festival, and critical reception has been overwhelmingly positive.

== Production ==
Zeman's and Brancaccio's objective was to bring the distinct elements into one overarching narrative: the oral tradition of urban legends, the mystery of several missing children from the region, the courtroom drama, the search for the roots of Staten Island's obsession with the case, and the community's need for catharsis.

When filming began, Zeman and Brancaccio sent Andre Rand a letter. Rand was serving a 25 year sentence for the 1987 kidnapping of Jennifer Schweiger, and was facing charges in 2004 for the kidnapping of Holly Ann Hughes, who disappeared in 1979. Rand had worked at the Willowbrook State School on Staten Island, and occasionally lived in campsites near the facility.

After not receiving a response for approximately a month, they decided to visit Rand directly at Rikers Island. On the day they were going to Rikers, they received the reply. After a series of letter exchanges, Rand agreed to an interview. However, by the time the filmmakers arrived at the prison, Rand had changed his mind and declined to be interviewed. The film also features extensive archival news footage and interviews with families of missing children who some believe Rand kidnapped or killed, police investigators into these crimes who suspect Rand may have had accomplices, and Rand's defense attorneys who dispute the accuracy of allegations against their client.

Andre Rand's court case in 2004 did not start until four years after his indictment, which was one of the longest pre-trial motions in New York State history. The culmination of the film alludes to indicting Rand, which became controversial.

== Reception ==
On review aggregator Rotten Tomatoes, Cropsey holds an approval rating of 93%, based on 45 reviews, and an average rating of 7.3/10. Its consensus reads, "Riveting and bone-chillingly creepy, Cropsey manages to be one of the best documentaries and one of the best horror movies of the year." On Metacritic, the film has a weighted average score of 73 out of 100, based on 14 critics, indicating "generally favorable" reviews.

After the 2009 premier, programmer David Kwok stated: “the eeriness of the mystery pulsates through the film as they journey into the underbelly… as more information and clues unravel, Zeman and Brancaccio become more immersed in shocking surprises and revelations. The reality they uncover in this uniquely hair-raising documentary is more terrifying than any urban legend.”

Film critic Roger Ebert gave the film three out of four stars, writing, "Cropsey is a creepy documentary with all the elements of a horror film about a demented serial killer, and an extra ingredient: This one is real." Jeannette Catsoulis of The New York Times called it "Disturbing and flavorful", praising the film's use of archival footage, interviews, and "true-crime narrative". Noel Murray from The A.V. Club wrote, "Cropsey is compelling as a meditation on how we use stories to explain the inconceivable, and how if no story is handy, we take the available clues and make one up." J.R. Jones from The Chicago Reader praised the film as "disturbing", and praised the filmmakers' exploration of the urban legend. Cynthia Fuches of PopMatters rated the film seven out of ten stars, offering the film similar praise as well is its storytelling and investigation aspects.

The film was not without its detractors. Slant Magazine's Nick Schager awarded the film two out of four stars, writing, "Zeman's portentous, trailer-ready narration and the film's correspondingly manipulative horror-film aesthetics and fondness for creepy suggestions over vigorous journalism, typified by a wannabe-Zodiac 'You decide!' ending, turns what might have been a portrait of the boogeyman myth's lingering societal role into merely a crude episode of 48 Hours."

Since its release, Cropsey has been featured on numerous lists of best true crime and horror documentaries by major publications, such as The New Yorker, The Huffington Post, Cosmopolitan, A.V. Club, Decider, and more.

=== Awards and nominations ===
- Hammer to Nail: 2009 Tribeca's Grand Jury Prize.
- IndieWIRE's 2009 Best Undistributed Film list, Annual Critics Survey.
- Closing Night Film, SF Documentary Festival.
- Audience Award Winner, Staten Island Film Festival.

== See also ==
- The Burning, a 1981 horror film based on the urban legend of Cropsey
- Madman, a 1982 horror film based on the urban legend of Cropsey
