= Murder of Tanya Jackson and Tatiana Dykes =

1997 murder of a mother and daughter in New York, US

Tanya Jackson
- Born: Tanya Denise Jackson; October 22, 1970; Alabama
- Died: c. June 25, 1997 (aged 26)
- Body discovered: June 28, 1997; Lakeview, New York, United States
- Other names: Peaches, Jane Doe No. 3
- Height: Unknown
- Children: Tatiana Dykes

Tanya Denise Jackson (October 22, 1970 – c. June 25, 1997), formerly known as "Peaches", "The Girl with the Peach Tattoo" or as Jane Doe No. 3, was a formerly-unidentified murder victim whose torso was discovered on June 28, 1997, in Lakeview, New York, near Hempstead Lake State Park. She remained unidentified until 2025, and her skull has yet to be found. Jackson had a tattoo on her left breast depicting a heart-shaped peach with a bite taken out of it and two drops falling from its core, which resulted in her nickname. By December 2016, additional skeletal remains found on Long Island in 2011 had been positively identified as belonging to Jackson, along with the remains of her daughter, identified in 2025 as Tatiana Marie Dykes. Due to the location of her remains, the murders of Jackson and Dykes were linked to the Long Island serial killer as potential victims. However, police no longer believe this to be the case, and Andrew Dykes, the father of her daughter Tatiana, has been charged with Tanya's murder.

== Case history ==
Tattoo

On June 28, 1997, a dismembered body was discovered by a man and his daughter out for a stroll in a wooded area of Hempstead Lake State Park, Lakeview, New York. The head, both arms, and both legs (below the knee) were severed and have yet to be found. The torso was found on the west side of Lake Drive, about 200 yards north of Peninsula Boulevard by the McDonald Pond. She was found in a Rubbermaid container along with a red towel and a floral pillowcase. With no leads to the woman's identity, the police published a picture of the approximately two-inch-wide tattoo in a national tattoo magazine, in the hopes of finding the artist who did the work. They received a call from Steve Cullen, a tattoo artist in Connecticut who claimed he remembered giving the tattoo to a woman. Cullen said he remembered the customer as a young black woman, about 18 or 19 years old, who was accompanied by two women, an aunt and a cousin. During the session, he also claimed she told him she was from either the Bronx or Long Island and that she was in Connecticut because she was having trouble with her boyfriend at the time. It is possible the woman had other tattoos on her arms or lower legs that the killer did not want found.

On December 13, 2016, Long Island Press reported that local authorities had positively identified skeletal remains (formerly referred to as "Jane Doe 3") found at Jones Beach State Park in 2011 as belonging to "Peaches". Remains of a child were also found in 2011, east of Cedar Beach, with DNA testing identifying Jane Doe 3—or "Peaches"—as the child's mother. As a result of these findings, Peaches was linked to the Long Island serial killer as a potential early victim.

== Identification ==
On October 8, 2022, the Mobile Police Department announced on its official Facebook page that the FBI was seeking relatives and friends of Elijah "Lige" Howell/Howard (1927–1963). Howard lived in Prichard, Alabama, with his wife Carrie and died in Mobile, Alabama, in 1963 while living with Ms. Lillie Mae Wiggins Packer. The FBI believed his relatives may be able to assist in identifying Peaches and her child.

On April 23, 2025, Nassau County police announced that they had identified Peaches as Tanya Denise Jackson, who was born on October 22, 1970. Jackson, a former resident of Mobile, Alabama, had served in the United States Army from 1993 to 1995, having been previously deployed during the Gulf War. Her daughter, Tatiana Marie Dykes, formerly known as "Baby Doe", was born on March 17, 1995, in Texas. At the time of their deaths, they lived in Brooklyn, where Jackson may have been working as a medical assistant, following station at Fort Hamilton. Jackson was estranged from her family, and the two were never reported missing. Tatiana's father was identified and was cooperating with the investigation. Police did not specify whether their murders were linked to the ongoing Gilgo Beach serial killings investigation.

On December 5, 2025, Andrew Dykes of Tampa, Florida was arrested for Jackson's murder and waiting for extradition. Dykes, a former United States Army anatomy instructor and Florida state police trooper, was the father of Tatiana Dykes and married to another woman at the time of his relationship with Jackson, having met while they were stationed at Fort Sam Houston. He was not charged in the killing of Tatiana, but investigators believe he was responsible for both deaths. Dykes was identified earlier following the identification of Jackson and Tatiana, but was not initially considered a suspect due to his cooperation with authorities.

== Related cases ==
=== "Cherries" ===
Tattoo worn by "Cherries"

On March 3, 2007, a dismembered torso was found in a suitcase in Harbor Island Park in Mamaroneck, Westchester County, New York. Investigators believe the victim was a heavy-set Hispanic or light-skinned African-American woman, about five feet seven inches tall, and 180 to 200 pounds. She had a tattoo of two red cherries on a green stem located on her right breast. "Cherries" (as she is referred to by law enforcement) was also decapitated and dismembered, although her original cause of death was a stab wound to the torso. Unlike Peaches, investigators found both of Cherries' legs, which washed up on the shore of Cablevision owner James Dolan's beachfront estate in Oyster Bay, New York. Inside the suitcase investigators found a pair of gray Champion sweat pants, a tan or cream-colored long-sleeved shirt by Voice and a red camisole bearing Spanish-language labels. The dark blue or black suitcase is sold exclusively at Walmart stores. Police also found small scraps of paper tucked away in the crevasses of the suitcase. When pieced together, it looks like a calendar with the Spanish word "cinco" and the phrase "begin to live." Police claim that since the torso floated onto the beach as storm-fed floods hit the region, it could have originated from almost anywhere.

== See also ==
- Gilgo Beach serial killings
- List of solved missing person cases (1990s)
- List of unsolved murders (1980–1999)
