= Creative Control (film) =

- Theatrical release poster
- Directed by: Benjamin Dickinson
- Written by: Benjamin Dickinson; Micah Bloomberg
- Produced by: Mark De Pace; Zachary Mortensen; Melody C. Roscher; Craig Shilowich
- Starring: Benjamin Dickinson; Nora Zehetner; Dan Gill; Alexia Rasmussen; Gavin McInnes; Reggie Watts
- Cinematography: Adam Newport-Berra
- Edited by: Megan Brooks; Andrew Hasse
- Music by: Dražen Bošnjak
- Production companies: Ghost Robot; Greencard Pictures; Mathematic
- Distributed by: Amazon Studios; Magnolia Pictures
- Release dates: March 14, 2015 (SXSW); March 11, 2016 (United States); November 9, 2016 (France)
- Running time: 97 minutes
- Country: United States
- Language: English
- Budget: $1 million
- Box office: $63,014

Creative Control is a 2015 American science fiction drama film, directed by Benjamin Dickinson from a screenplay written by Micah Bloomberg and Dickinson. It stars Dickinson, Nora Zehetner, Dan Gill, Alexia Rasmussen, Gavin McInnes and Reggie Watts.

Creative Control had its world premiere at South by Southwest on March 14, 2015. The film was released on March 11, 2016, by Amazon Studios and Magnolia Pictures.

== Plot ==
In the near future, an ad executive uses a new reality technology to conduct an affair with his best friend's girlfriend.

== Cast ==
- Benjamin Dickinson as David
- Nora Zehetner as Juliette
- Dan Gill as Wim
- Alexia Rasmussen as Sophie
- Gavin McInnes as Scott
- Reggie Watts as Reggie Watts
- Himanshu Suri as Reny
- Jay Eisenberg as Hollis
- Meredith Hagner as Becky
- Jake Lodwick as Gabe
- Robert Bogue as The Actor
- Jessica Blank as Lucy
- Austin Ku as Teddy
- H. Jon Benjamin as Gary Gass
- Sonja O'Hara as Lauren
- Jon Watts as Commercial Director

== Post-production ==
A campaign was set up on Kickstarter.com to raise funds for the visual effects on the film, $32,000 was raised against a $30,000 goal.

== Release ==
The film had its world premiere at South by Southwest on March 14, 2015. In October 2015, Amazon Studios acquired distribution rights to the film, partnering with Magnolia Pictures for its theatrical release. The film was released in a limited release on March 11, 2016. It was released on video on demand on April 12, 2016.

== Reception ==
Creative Control received mixed reviews from film critics. It holds a 61% approval rating on review aggregator website Rotten Tomatoes, based on 56 reviews, with an average rating of 6.2/10. On Metacritic, the film holds a rating of 58 out of 100, based on 29 critics, indicating "mixed or average" reviews.

Ben Kengisberg of Variety gave the film a positive review writing: "But a contemplative tone, a zigzagging narrative, superb widescreen black-and-white cinematography and an infusion of dry humor make it feel genuinely fresh. Critical nurturing could help this moody, offbeat indie find its audience."

Eric Kohn of Indiewire.com gave the film an A and a positive review writing: "At times, 'Creative Control' feels just a touch overstylized for its own good, with a few too many slo-mo bits set to classical music to remind us of the refined environment at every turn. Even then, however, the overstatement plays into the movie's favor by elaborating on the illusion of perfection created by twenty-first century machines. Visually scrumptious and slickly told, 'Creative Control' illustrates the power of groundbreaking technology while also indicting its extremes."
