= Waldschmidt =

Waldschmidt is a surname. Notable people with the surname include:

- Anne Waldschmidt (born 1958), German sociologist and professor at the University of Cologne.
- Britta Waldschmidt-Nelson (born 1965), German Associate Professor of American History and Culture
- Ernst Waldschmidt (1897, Lünen – 1985, Göttingen), German orientalist
- Henkie (Henki) Waldschmidt (born 1988, Den Haag), Dutch racing driver
- Luca Waldschmidt (born 1996), German footballer
- Michel Waldschmidt (born 1946), French mathematician
- Paul E. Waldschmidt (1920–1994), American Roman Catholic bishop
- Stephen Waldschmidt, American-Canadian actor

- Waldschmidt Hall (originally: West Hall), an academic building at the University of Portland in Portland, Oregon

== See also ==
- Waldschmidt-Camp Dennison District
