= She Has a Name =

2009 Andrew Kooman play about human trafficking

- Promotional Facebook/Twitter profile picture for the 2012 cross-Canada tour
- Written by: Andrew Kooman
- Chorus: Four dead child prostitutes
- Characters: Jason; Number 18; Ali; Marta; Mama; Pimp
- Original language: English
- Subject: Child sex tourism Forced prostitution Human trafficking Prostitution of children Sexual slavery
- Genre: Legal thriller Political drama Tragedy
- Setting: Bangkok, Thailand

Premiere
- Date premiered: February 23, 2011
- Place premiered: EPCOR Centre for the Performing Arts in Calgary, Alberta, Canada
- Official website

She Has a Name is a play about human trafficking written by Andrew Kooman in 2009 as a single act and expanded to full length in 2010. It is about the trafficking of children into sexual slavery and was inspired by the deaths of 54 people in the Ranong human-trafficking incident. Kooman had previously published literature, but this was his first full-length play. The stage premiere of She Has a Name was directed by Stephen Waldschmidt in Calgary, Alberta in February 2011. From May to October 2012, She Has a Name toured across Canada. In conjunction with the tour, A Better World raised money to help women and children who had been trafficked in Thailand as part of the country's prostitution industry. The first performances of She Has a Name in the United States took place in Folsom, California in 2014 under the direction of Emma Eldridge, who was a 23-year-old college student at the time.

The script calls for five actors to portray ten characters. The two main characters are Jason, a young Canadian lawyer; and Number 18, a young female prostitute who claims to be fifteen years old and has been a prostitute for six years. The drama centers on Jason's infiltration of a brothel ring that is trafficking girls into Bangkok. Jason comes to believe that Number 18 could be a key witness to a human trafficking incident and tries to gain her trust and persuade her to testify against the ring. The victimized child in the play is known only by the number 18 to reflect how traffickers often dehumanize their victims by giving them a new name or simply a number, which in some cases is branded onto the victim's body. Waldschmidt said he hoped that She Has a Name will educate Canadians about human trafficking and motivate them to act on what they learn, thereby turning them into anti-sexual slavery activists.

She Has a Name received strong endorsement from Canadian activists, including MP Joy Smith, Ratanak International's Brian McConaghy, and IJM Canada's Jamie McIntosh. The play's premiere and initial run were critically acclaimed. In the 2012 tour across Canada, She Has a Name was performed in several fringe theatre festivals, at which critics representing the Montreal Gazette, the Winnipeg Free Press, and CFEQ-FM said it stood out for its quality and moral content.

== Background ==
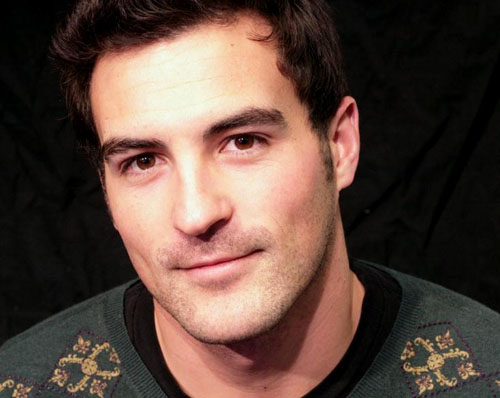
She Has a Name was Andrew Kooman's debut play.

She Has a Name was the first full-length play by Andrew Kooman, a playwright and author from Alberta in western Canada. He began work on it in 2008 and finished a one-act version by 2009, writing under the guidance of a dramaturge at a Scripts At Work workshop at Red Deer College. He drew on his experiences working with a Canadian film crew in Thailand in 2006. He intended to extend the script into a full-length play eventually. Kooman had previously written other literary works, including the young adult novel Ten Silver Coins: The Drylings of Acchora, and two plays, Shelter and Joseph, that had been selected for development at Scripts At Work workshops.

Kooman first became aware of human trafficking while he was working for the nonprofit organization Youth With A Mission (YWAM) in southeast Malaysia, where he met children who had been trafficked. Kooman later realized that people are also trafficked in Canada. Kooman wrote She Has a Name with the intention of bringing attention to this issue, specifically in connection with sexual exploitation.

To ground the play in reality, Kooman researched human trafficking and met with survivors. He read about the Ranong human-trafficking incident, in which 121 people were trafficked from Burma to Thailand and left in a locked water tank, which was then abandoned by its drivers and discovered only after 54 of the people had died from suffocation or hyperthermia. The truck carrying the water tank had been abandoned because it ran out of fuel. When the truck was discovered in April 2008, it contained men, women, and children. Knowing that many of the impoverished girls who are smuggled in this manner become enslaved in brothels as child prostitutes, Kooman used the incident in the backstory of the play.

In January 2010, there was a full reading of the one-act version of the play. Despite an unfinished script and a performance by amateur actors, it evoked a strong response from the audience. Later that year, Stephen Waldschmidt, an artistic associate of Burnt Thicket Theatre, asked to read the script of She Has a Name, and later said he could not put it down. He was initially reluctant to attach himself to the play because of the immensity and ugliness of the issues therein, but he ultimately worked with Kooman to expand it into a full-length play with an extra hour of material by the end of 2010. The result is a play that can be performed in 90 minutes but may last up to two hours. Burnt Thicket Theatre served as the play's initial production company.

== Characters ==
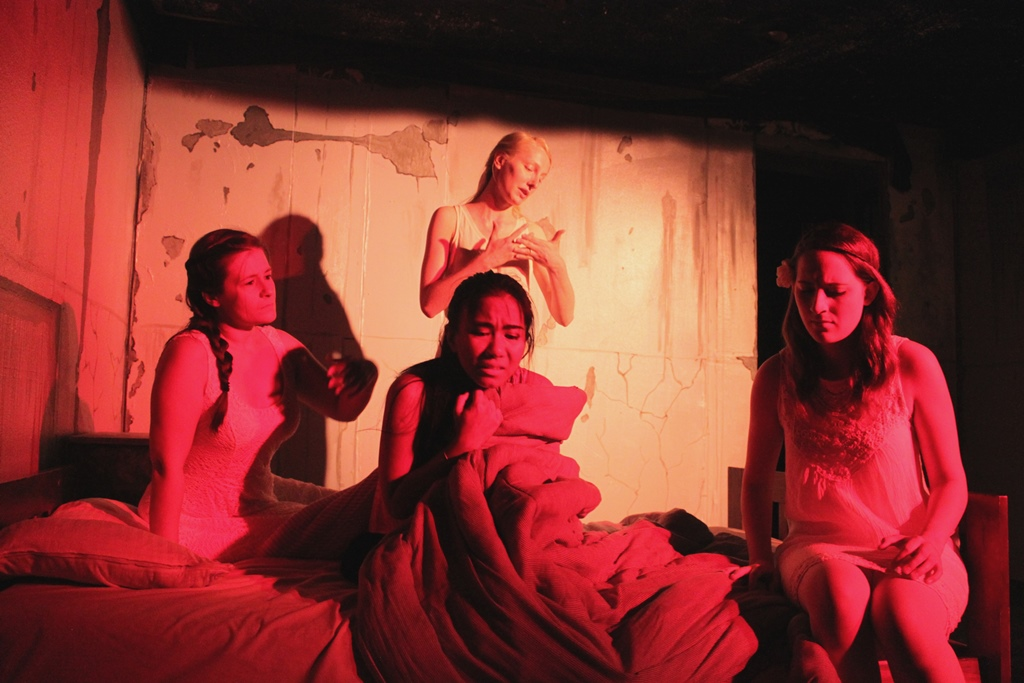
The voices have been variously considered angels or ghosts, and are sometimes frightening and at other times consoling.

There are ten characters in She Has a Name, but the script calls for only five actors, four female and one male. The main characters are Jason and Number 18. Jason is a young, Canadian lawyer with experience in corporate law. He found this work unsatisfying, so he started working in international human rights law for the United Nations and a non-governmental organization (NGO) that opposes sex trafficking. Number 18—the play's heroine—is a young, female prostitute who claims to be fifteen years old and has been a prostitute for six years. Ali is Jason's wife, and they have two young daughters. Marta is Jason's employer, who has become very tough from years of fighting for justice and who is now driven and stressed. The other characters are a pimp, who is unnamed, and his assistant, a cruel brothel keeper called Mama.

The script calls for one actor to play both male characters—Jason and the pimp. Jason and Number 18 are haunted by four voices. As poetic and prophetic voices, these characters serve much the same purpose as a chorus in Greek tragedies, according to reviewer Lana Michelin of the Red Deer Advocate. Variously considered angels or ghosts, the voices are written in the script to be played by the female actors who portray Number 18, Marta, Ali, and Mama. While these voices sometimes emphasize the horrors of the sex industry, at other times, they offer comfort to Number 18. It is only revealed at the play's conclusion that the chorus is made up of dead child prostitutes.

== Plot summary ==
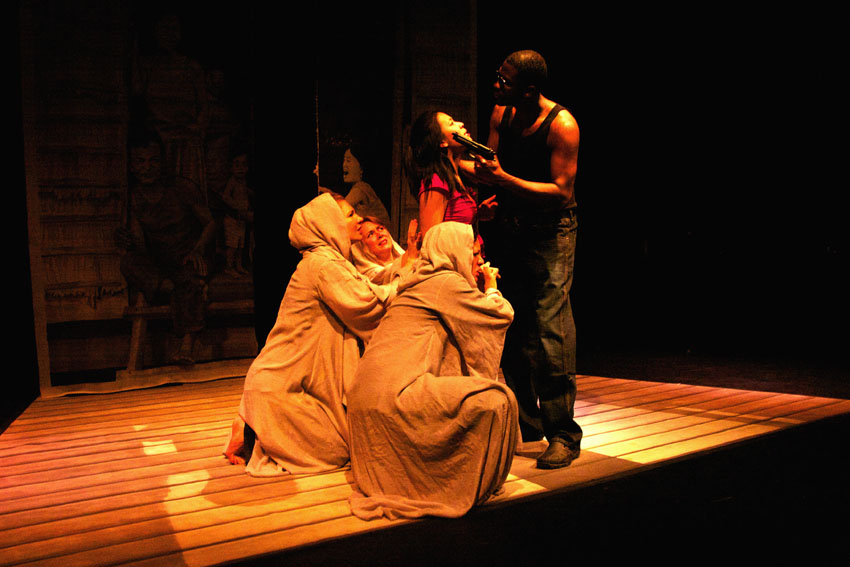
Number 18 is regularly abused despite being her pimp's favourite prostitute.

A pimp rapes Number 18 in a bar, then enslaves her sexually. Number 18's father died when she was young and her family struggled to support her thereafter. Strangers took her from her home in Cambodia as a child, replaced her name with a number, and prostituted her in various countries. Number 18 ends up in the Thai child prostitution industry. Most of her clients are rich men, many of them foreign tourists. In a brothel and bar called The Pearl, Number 18 is kept in a dark room containing only a table and a dilapidated bed. Whenever she fails to follow the orders of Mama, the brothel-keeper, Mama shouts at her and beats her. Number 18 prays for a man to come and save her from these ordeals. At the same time she becomes the most elegant and highly sought-after prostitute at The Pearl and her pimp's favourite. She becomes very proficient in pleasing men sexually but also remains childlike—she dries her face with her skirt and plays with its hem.

Jason starts work with an NGO in Thailand, having left his wife and children in Canada and abandoned a lucrative job at his father-in-law's legal firm. He communicates with his wife Ali over Skype. Jason's first task is to find witnesses to or survivors from a human-trafficking incident and then to shut down the brothels into which they have been trafficked; his boss Marta sends him into the brothels as she cannot enter herself. His specific focus is an Asia-wide brothel ring's trafficking of girls into Bangkok for prostitution as part of the child sex tourism industry. An abandoned storage truck has been discovered containing the bodies of dead sex workers. Attempting to build a legal case against the brothel ring, Jason pays to see prostitutes in the hope that one of them witnessed the incident. The first prostitute he sees is Number 18, whose attempts to seduce him make him uneasy. Thinking Number 18 could be a key witness, he tries to persuade her to testify. The other prostitutes Jason encounters are too afraid to give evidence. Number 18 answers some of Jason's questions about where she is from, where she has worked, and how long she has been working, but only on the condition that Jason pay 100 baht for each response. She reveals that she has been prostituted in Thailand and Malaysia.

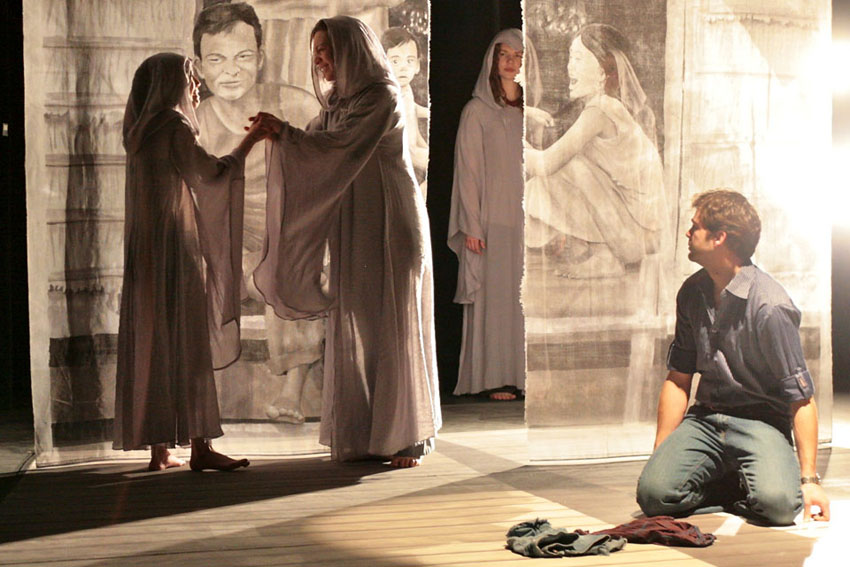
After her pimp kills her, Number 18 joins the chorus of dead child prostitutes.

It is revealed that Number 18 was one of the girls in the storage truck, but that she escaped and ended up at The Pearl. Traumatized, she does not understand what Jason wants. She knows that every girl who has talked about the storage truck incident has been killed and is therefore reluctant to testify. One night Number 18 is injured in a party at the brothel and can barely walk when Jason visits. When he tells Ali about his experiences, she begs him to come home, but Jason believes he is in Bangkok by divine providence. Number 18 comes to understand that Jason is not like the other men who frequent The Pearl, and agrees to trust him and testify against the brothel ring if he can rescue her.

Jason pays Number 18's pimp enough money to take her out of the brothel for a weekend. Before he arrives to take her away, however, Mama finds and confiscates the money Jason has previously paid Number 18, and correctly guesses that he does not intend to bring her back. When Jason arrives to collect Number 18, Mama tells him she is dead and offers a refund. Believing Number 18 is still alive, Jason becomes violent. Mama mocks him, saying the Western culture he is part of is hedonistic and responsible for people in the Third World being sexually trafficked. Jason stops short of hurting Mama and leaves to report to Marta. Through her connections, Marta discovers that Number 18 is alive. Marta tries to save Number 18, posing as a lawyer protecting Number 18's rights. The pimp forces Marta off with a gun. When Jason makes another attempt to rescue Number 18, the pimp kills her. Number 18 joins the chorus of dead child prostitutes who have been watching over and commenting on events throughout the play.

== Productions ==
=== Initial run ===
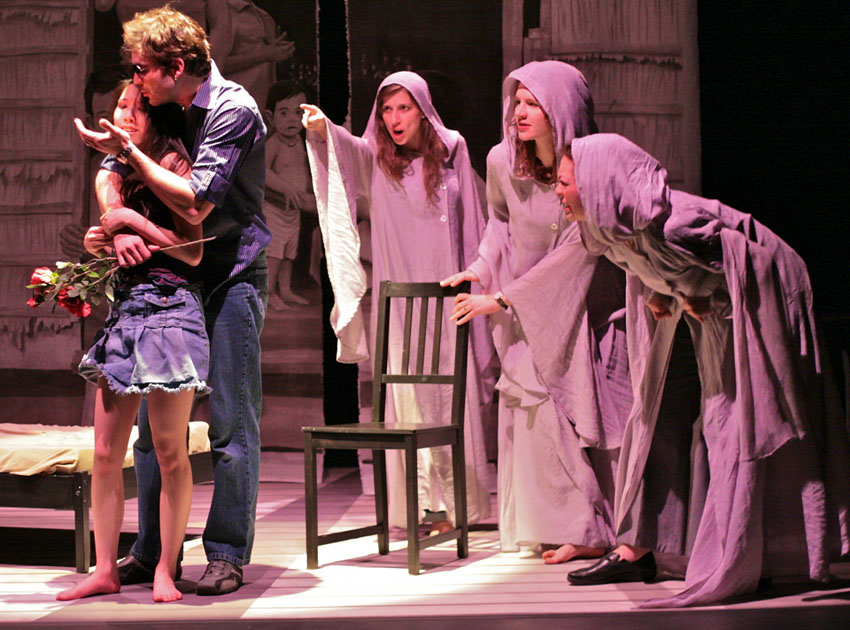
The 2011 cast (left to right): Denise Wong, Aaron Krogman, Cari Russell, Glenda Warkentin, and Sienna Howell-Holden

The stage premiere of She Has a Name was directed by Waldschmidt, who was also the scenic designer. Aaron Krogman was selected to portray Jason and the unnamed pimp, Sienna Howell-Holden to portray Mama, Glenda Warkentin to portray Marta, Denise Wong to portray Number 18, and Cari Russell to portray Ali. Waldschmidt suggested that Warkentin audition for the play after seeing her perform at Rosebud Theatre in Rosebud, Alberta. Wong, Krogman, and Kooman spoke highly of Waldschmidt's directing, and Kooman praised Waldschmidt's work as scenic designer. Waldschmidt praised the cast's acting. He said he found the play's opening scene, in which a rape occurs, the most difficult to stage, despite having previously performed a similar rape scene as an actor. The premiere of She Has a Name was produced by Burnt Thicket Theatre in partnership with Raise Their Voice. The office of Joy Smith, MP for Kildonan—St. Paul, released a statement advertising the premiere of She Has a Name.

The premiere took place at the EPCOR Centre for the Performing Arts in Calgary in February 2011. Performances were scheduled to run on the centre's Motel stage between February 23 and March 5. Tickets quickly sold out. Four days after the premiere, Burnt Thicket Theatre moved the play to the Scott Block Theatre in Red Deer, where the play was scheduled to be performed until March 12. All the performances in Red Deer were sold out. The play drew emotional reactions from the audience. Kooman learned that some audience members at the initial performances later responded to the play by talking with others about human trafficking, writing letters to their Members of Parliament, and doing other creative things on the subject. They also contacted Waldschmidt, sometimes up to a year later, with stories about how the play had continued to affect their lives. In conjunction with the initial run of She Has a Name, Burnt Thicket Theatre provided the names of organizations that assist human-trafficking victims. There was also a panel discussion about human trafficking after the matinée on February 26.

=== Pre-tour revisions and readings ===
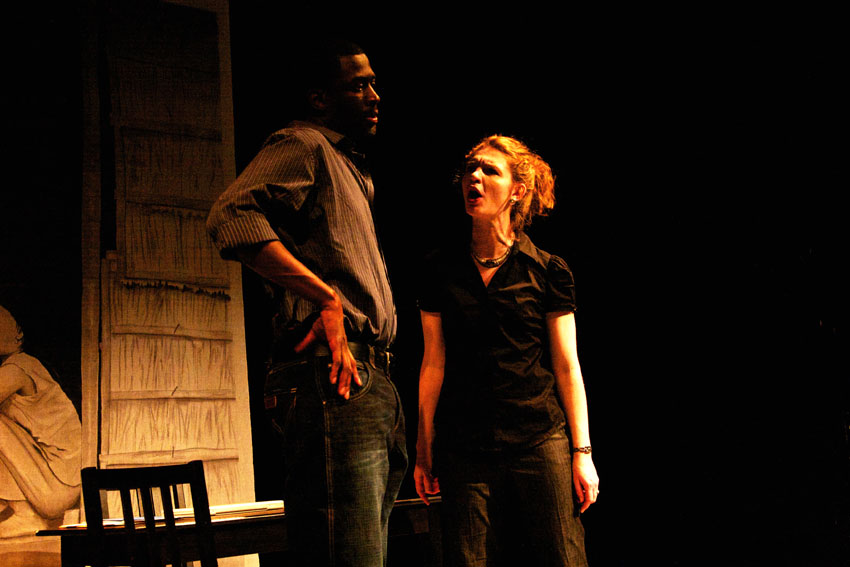
Jason and Marta arguing in a 2012 performance. The scenes involving these two characters were altered considerably following the premiere.

After the play's initial run, Kooman revised the script, making prominent changes in the scenes involving Jason and Marta. In the version performed at the premiere, the two characters debate issues of human rights on a solely philosophical level, while in the new version, Marta makes real demands of Jason, making their interactions more dynamic. Kooman made Jason's wife Ali more patient and understanding in dealing with Jason's lengthy absences from home and removed the intermission. According to reviewer Lana Michelin of the Red Deer Advocate, Kooman's changes strengthened the emotional pull of the play. Because of the amount of interest in She Has a Name in 2011, not enough tickets were available for the initial run, and a second run was planned for the end of 2011. To finance a tour of the play, Burnt Thicket Theatre raised money through fundraisers, which included the 2011 Calgary Ride for Refuge.

In August 2011, extracts from She Has a Name were read at a conference in Strathmore called Justice Tapestry. A reading of the play took place during an event at Mount Royal University on February 16, 2012, which also included a speech by Yvon Dandurand on the subject of human trafficking, and a book signing by John Winterdyk for his book Human Trafficking: Exploring the International Nature, Concerns, and Complexities.

=== 2012 tour ===
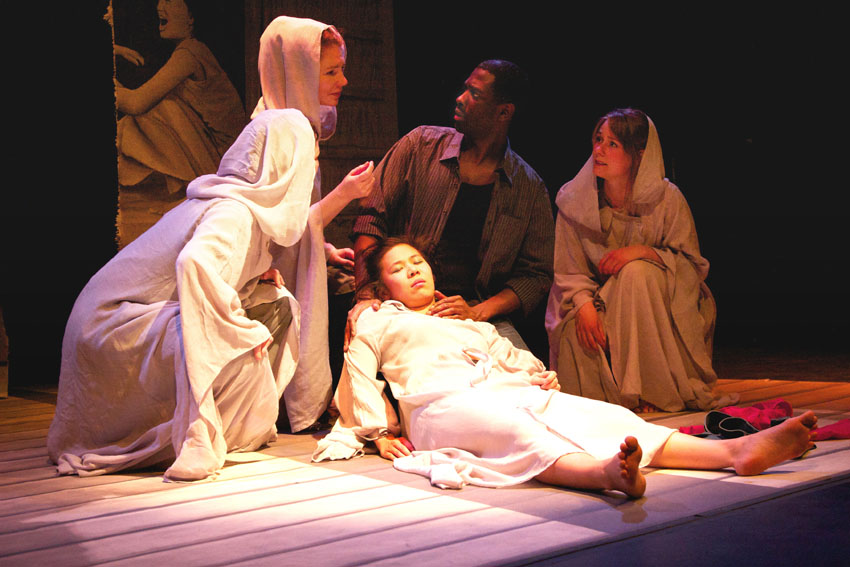
The 2012 cast (left to right): Sienna Howell-Holden, Glenda Warkentin, Evelyn Chew, Carl Kennedy, and Alysa van Haastert

The 2012 tour of She Has a Name was a fringe theatre tour across Canada. The performances were co-produced by Burnt Thicket Theatre and Raise Their Voice and were directed by Waldschmidt. Carl Kennedy portrayed Jason, Evelyn Chew portrayed Number 18, Alysa van Haastert portrayed Ali, and Warkentin and Howell-Holden returned as Marta and Mama. To avoid giving the impression that human trafficking is limited to Asia, the producers deliberately cast actors who were not of Asian descent.

The tour started on May 23 in Lethbridge and went on to the other Canadian cities of Saskatoon, Ottawa, Montreal, Halifax, London, Winnipeg, Calgary, Victoria, Vancouver, Kelowna, Edmonton, and Red Deer. London was added mid-tour because of popular demand. The London performances were hosted by Men Against Sexual Trafficking and the London Anti-Human Trafficking Committee. The final performances of the tour were conducted at the Scott Block Theatre in Red Deer from October 2 to 6. After the Saturday matinée in each city, a panel discussion was held with both the audience and anyone else who wanted to attend, the purpose being to raise awareness about human trafficking in Canada and elsewhere. The final talkback panel in Red Deer was attended by about 70 people.

A Better World partnered with Raise Their Voice to raise funds throughout the tour to help women and children who had been trafficked in Thailand as part of the country's prostitution industry. Kooman stated that he had "a 'pinch me' sort of feeling that [the 2012 tour] has happened, and that there is interest beyond this tour". Cynthia Foster, who attended one of the performances during the tour, went on to produce and direct the first school production, with students at Strathcona Christian Academy Secondary School acting in two performances at La Cite in Edmonton in November 2014. Kooman was scheduled to facilitate a discussion about sex trafficking with the audience after each performance.

=== Performances in the United States ===
The first performances of She Has a Name in the United States were produced by FreeFall Stage in a rented space at Victory Life Church in Folsom, California in 2014 under the direction of Emma Eldridge, who was a 23-year-old college student at the time. She and her sister had become passionate about the issue of human trafficking as a result of their involvement with the organization Run for Courage, and the two sisters considered writing a play about human trafficking in the United States. Because they were both college students, they did not find the time to write a play, so in 2013, their mother, Deedee Eldridge, began looking for a human-trafficking-related play that had already been written and she discovered She Has a Name. It was the only play she was able to find on the subject of human trafficking. Emma Eldridge later said of She Has a Name, "I've never read something and been so compelled to do it." The family decided to stage the play, and Deedee Eldridge served as producer and executive director. To have the rights to produce the play, FreeFall Stage made a special arrangement with the Playwrights Guild of Canada.

For these initial performances in 2014, the characters of Jason and the pimp were portrayed by different actors; Chris Quandt portrayed Jason and Arturo Gonzalez portrayed the pimp. The role of Number 18 was taken on by Supatchaya "Jazz" Sunpanich, who was born in Thailand. Emma Eldridge attested to crying at the first rehearsal as a result of being moved by the intensity of Sunpanich's performance. In these performances, Ali was portrayed by Brianna Flynn and Adison Kingsley, Marta by Marybeth Moore and Janine Romney, and Mama by Sara Matsui-Colby. The voices were separately portrayed by Caitlyn Wardell, Bonnie Antignani, and Jeannette Baisch. These performances were staged in partnership with Run for Courage, which had representatives at each performance. Performances were scheduled to run from May 2 to June 22.

FreeFall Stage discouraged people under the age of fifteen from attending because of the subject matter of the play, but encouraged older teenagers to attend because teenagers are at the greatest risk of being trafficked. Several human trafficking survivors attended the performances, and other survivors sent the Eldridges messages about their personal experiences with human trafficking. Quandt said that he encountered many audience members who, because of watching the play, became determined to do something to combat human trafficking.

=== Film ===
By February 2012, Kooman was working on a screenplay version of She Has a Name. The idea of a stage-to-film adaptation of She Has a Name was also independently suggested by Pat Donnelly of the Montreal Gazette. In 2014, Kooman and his younger brothers, Daniel and Matthew, scouted locations in Cambodia in preparation for the film.

== Themes ==
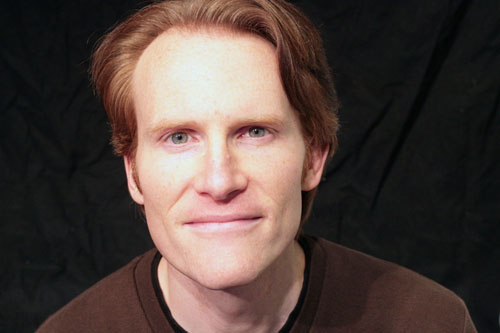
Stephen Waldschmidt said that the sympathetic portrayal of the perpetrators prevents the play from becoming simplistic.

Kooman made justice the focus of She Has a Name; the social issues that interest him include poverty, the HIV/AIDS epidemic, and the effects of war. The central issues in She Has a Name are gender-based. The general topic of the play is human trafficking—specifically the trafficking of children into sexual slavery. Kooman has stated that She Has a Name "suggests that justice can only be realized if real people know, care and take informed and decisive action." The victimized child in the play is known only by the number 18 to reflect that traffickers often dehumanize their victims by giving them a new name or simply a number, which in some cases is branded onto the victim's body. After his rape of Number 18, the pimp leaves the situation without adverse effect, but Number 18 is left bleeding from her crotch and mouth. The play invites viewers to feel sympathetic towards Number 18, and, although the world of human trafficking is depicted as horrific and ugly, both the victims and perpetrators of human trafficking are portrayed as relatable characters, suggesting that every individual has inherent value and dignity. In an interview with The Calgary Journal prior to the 2012 tour, Waldschmidt said that the sympathetic portrayal of the perpetrators prevents the play from becoming a simplistic story of good and evil. According to Liz Nicholls of the Edmonton Journal, Number 18 is a nuanced character, better-developed than the stock damsel in distress.

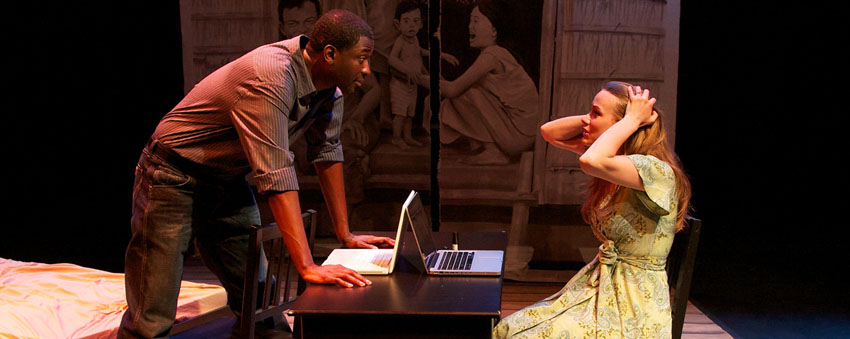
To depict the tension between Jason and Ali, the two communicate via Skype, which is represented on stage by two laptops that are set up back-to-back.

Kooman said that the massive proportions of human trafficking often prevent people from dealing with it; he therefore chose to portray a single trafficked victim in the play so that audiences could approach the subject on a more workable level. He hoped that audiences would avoid getting stuck in the statistics of human trafficking and would connect with a personal story. The two questions that propel the story are: "Can [Jason] convince [Number 18] to risk her life to testify for the sake of justice?" and "Can he save her from the unthinkable circumstances?" Jason is weary and, although he never falls into self-pity, he comes to hate himself for his inability to save Number 18 from her slavery because he lacks the evidence he requires for his case to be successful in court.

Much of the play is concerned with demonstrating the immensity of the difficulties that face Jason in trying to rescue Number 18. For example, he finds it difficult to be away from his wife, and struggles with the decision of whether to continue his work or return to Canada. To depict this tension, Jason and Ali communicate via Skype, represented on stage by two laptop computers placed back-to-back with Jason and Ali standing on either side facing one another. The two argue, but their interactions demonstrate the kind of love that Number 18 can only dream of. In the 2012 cross-Canada tour, a torn picture of Number 18's family remained on stage as scenery to emphasize what the character has lost. This picture took the form of a painted curtain held over a geometric floor pattern and depicted the family as tired, poor, and living in a shack. Lana Michelin of the Red Deer Advocate said the most emotionally gripping scene was the one in which the voices cause Number 18 to recall the face of her dead father. Anna Borowiecki of the St. Albert Gazette called the play a story of "fallible people who find strength in each other under the worst conditions."

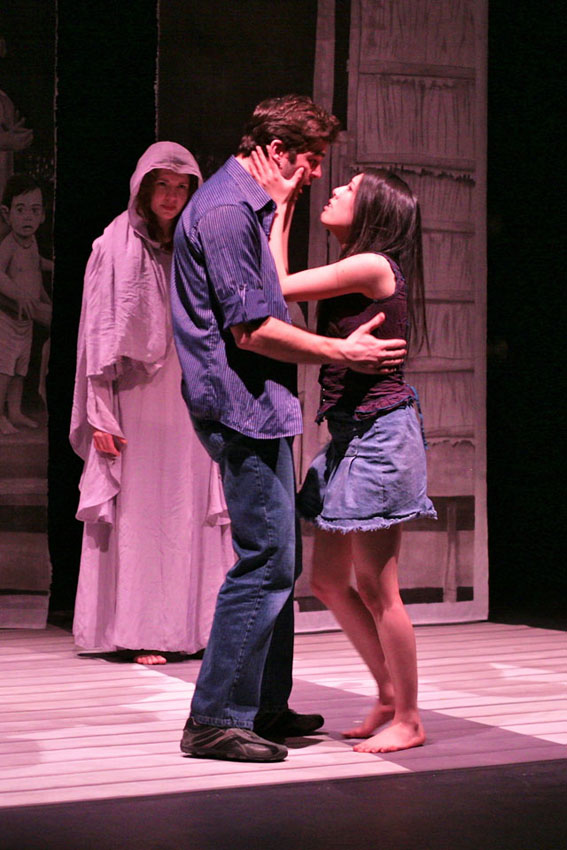
Aaron Krogman portrayed both Jason and the pimp in the premiere, and stated that "both characters are struggling with power and how they use it."

Denise Wong, the Calgarian actor who portrayed Number 18 in the premiere, said that the play was about the human condition. Evelyn Chew, the Vancouverite actor who took over the role for the 2012 tour, said that the play is intense because it unabashedly deals with human trafficking, and that builds in intensity to its climax. Sienna Howell-Holden, who played Mama in the premiere and the 2012 tour, said that many audience members had not been previously familiar with 21st-century human trafficking. The character of Mama calls attention to the fact that poverty in the Third World fuels sex trafficking. Stephen Waldschmidt said he hoped that the play will educate Canadians about human trafficking and motivate them to act on what they learn, thereby turning them into anti-sexual slavery activists. He also said he hoped that the play will put a face on the million women and children sold into sexual slavery each year worldwide. Because of the play's heavy themes, producers of the first performances issued an advisory for parents. Waldschmidt also stressed the amount of action in the play and said that, if the play was a film, it would receive a PG-13 rating and would be billed a thriller. He also said it was difficult to stage a play that is inherently sexual and extremely violent in nature without making it feel pornographic. Waldschmidt said that he wanted to stage She Has a Name partially to show how horrible human trafficking is and partially because the play is so theatrically gripping.

The Country Sunrise News stated that the drama has a fast pace. Mallory Clarkson of the London Community News reported that, while She Has a Name is an emotional play, there are lighter moments where audience members can laugh. Similarly, Lana Michelin of the Red Deer Advocate asserted that the play's sporadic humorous points maintain the audience's engagement with the story so they do not become numb to the play's emotional pulls. Kooman stated that he tried to write the play in a way that would shock audiences without disturbing them to the point that they would not recommend it to friends.

Marlo Campbell, a writer for Uptown, said that the play critiques masculine egotism and Western heroism through the character of Jason. Lana Michelin of the Red Deer Advocate disagreed, stating that Jason never lapses into self-importance. Aaron Krogman, who portrayed Jason and the pimp in the play's premiere, said, "there is a thin line between Jason and the pimp ... both characters are struggling with power and how they use it." Waldschmidt stated that the doubling of this role is intended to remind audiences that there are Canadians who are perpetrators of human trafficking and that it "is not just somebody else's problem over there ... but that it's us, and it's in our country and in our backyard and in our suburbs". Jason has in this way been considered an everyman. Chris Quandt, who portrayed Jason at the United States premiere, said that he and his fellow cast members greatly appreciated the fact that Kooman incorporated into the play the facts that taking down one brothel often leaves space for another brothel to be established soon afterwards, and that child sex tourism exists because there is a demand for it.

One Canadian critic said that the play's Bangkok setting allows Canadians to easily dissociate from the issue. Liz Nicholls of the Edmonton Journal wrote that the pimp character "represents the ruthless spirit of pure human greed." Stephen Pederson of The Chronicle Herald called the play a combination of idealism, realism, and lyricism. Dustin Wiebe of the Mennonite Brethren Herald wrote that the play shows "the darker side of man's desire for control" by presenting Number 18 as having been stripped of her humanity. The disaster that concludes the play is foreshadowed throughout. The play both starts and ends with a depiction of the reality of contemporary slavery.

== Critical reception ==
Professional ratings
Review scores
Source	Rating
Calgary Herald	4/5 stars
Calgary Sun	4/5 stars
Canadian Broadcasting Corporation	4/5 stars
The Charlebois Post	5/5 stars
CFEQ-FM	5/5 stars
The Folsom Telegraph	5/5 stars
Times Colonist	3/5 stars
Uptown	3.5/5 stars
Winnipeg Free Press	3.5/5 stars

Critical response to She Has a Name began with initial readings of the play at the 2009 Scripts At Work workshop, where the script was given the Scripts At Work/Alberta Playwrights Network Award. The play has since become very successful and was endorsed by Canadian activists including MP Joy Smith, Ratanak International's Brian McConaghy, and IJM Canada's Jamie McIntosh. Lara Quarterman, director of the Calgary chapter of ACT Alberta, said she was concerned that She Has a Name suggests that human trafficking is limited to the sex trafficking of women and children in Thailand, but there is sexual-slavery-related human trafficking in Canada, and there is also human trafficking for the purposes of unfree labour. The chorus of dead human-trafficking victims has generally received negative reviews; one critic called it "the play's least successful device". Adrian Chamberlain of the Victoria Times Colonist criticised some of the script, charging that there were "implausible plot twists" and other "fundamental flaws", but concluded that it was well-intentioned and ambitious and "has its heart in the right place."

The play's premiere and initial run were mostly critically acclaimed. The religious community's reviews of the initial run were also positive. After the first performances in 2011, Louis Hobson of the Calgary Sun said the character of Marta was an unrealistic caricature and didn't "ring true" because of how she was written. The character underwent a series of rewrites to make her more well-rounded and kind before the 2012 cross-Canada tour. In the 2012 tour, the play was performed in several fringe theatre festivals, at which critics representing the Montreal Gazette, the Winnipeg Free Press, and CFEQ-FM said it stood out for its quality and moral content. The writing was praised by one critic from the Victoria News, who wrote that the play demonstrates that Kooman has a "gift for creating powerful, believable dialogue that can draw an audience in", but criticised by Chamberlain of the Times Colonist, who attested to "melodramatic—and just plain bad—cop-show dialogue". Liz Nicholls of the Edmonton Journal called the performances compelling. Karen Nelson, also of the Edmonton Journal, called the play "sobering" in such a way that she was caused "to wonder what [she] could do about this global epidemic of abuse of children, women and the disenfranchised."

During the 2012 tour, Kooman was awarded the Outstanding Alumnus Provincial Award Celebrating Excellence by the Alberta Association of Colleges & Technical Institutes and the Alberta Ministry of Enterprise. At the St-Ambroise Montreal Fringe Festival, She Has a Name was nominated for the 2012 Centaur Theatre Award for Best Anglophone Production. At the Victoria Fringe Theatre Festival, She Has a Name was selected for a "Pick of the Fringe" award. Later in the 2012 tour, Sienna Howell-Holden won a Spirit of the Fringe Award at the Vancouver Fringe Festival for her portrayal of Mama.

When the play was staged in California in 2014, Gerry Camp of The Folsom Telegraph said that he had "never been more emotionally drained than ... after seeing the riveting opening night performance." He praised all of the actors' performances, and particularly those of Quandt and Sunpanich. "If you truly love theater, you must see this play," he concluded. "And I promise you, it is a play you will carry with you long after the lights have gone up."
