= She Has a Name (film) =

- Film poster
- Directed by: Daniel Kooman; Matthew Kooman
- Written by: Andrew Kooman
- Based on: She Has a Name (play) by Andrew Kooman
- Produced by: Donna Abraham; Shari Aspinall; Andrew Kooman; Daniel Kooman; Matthew Kooman
- Starring: Will Yun Lee; Eugenia Yuan; Teresa Ting; Gil Bellows; Giovanni Mocibob; Vanessa Toh
- Cinematography: Bob Nguyen
- Production company: Unveil Studios
- Release date: December 12, 2016
- Country: Canada
- Language: English

She Has a Name is a 2016 Canadian drama thriller film directed by Daniel Kooman and Matthew Kooman and written by Andrew Kooman, based on the play of same name by Andrew. The film stars Will Yun Lee, Eugenia Yuan, Teresa Ting, Gil Bellows, and Giovanni Mocibob.

== Cast ==
- Will Yun Lee
- Eugenia Yuan
- Teresa Ting
- Vanessa Toh
- Gil Bellows
- Giovanni Mocibob
- Deborah Fennelly

== Production ==
In February 2012, Andrew Kooman was adapting a screenplay version of his play She Has a Name. The idea of a 'stage-to-film adaptation' of the play was also independently suggested by Pat Donnelly of the Montreal Gazette. In 2014, Shari Aspinall, Kooman and his younger brothers, Daniel and Matthew, scouted locations in Cambodia in preparation for the film.

Principal photography on the film began in November 2015 in Bangkok, Thailand and ended on January 22, 2016.
