= Stephen Baron =

Stephen Baron may refer to:

- Stephen Baron (friar) (died 1520), English Franciscan friar
- Steve Baron (born 1990), American baseball catcher

== See also ==
- Steve Barron (born 1956), Irish-born British film director and producer
