= Ronnie Taylor =

British cinematographer

- Born: Ronald Charles Taylor; 27 October 1924; London, England
- Died: 3 August 2018 (aged 93); Ibiza, Balearic Islands, Spain
- Other name: Ron Taylor
- Occupation: Cinematographer
- Years active: 1942–2002
- Spouse: Mary Devetta (married 1952-2018)
- Children: 2, Tracey Taylor • Nikki Watson

Ronald Charles "Ronnie" Taylor, BSC (27 October 1924 – 3 August 2018) was an English cinematographer, best known for his collaborations with directors Richard Attenborough and Dario Argento. He won an Academy Award for Best Cinematography for his work on Attenborough's Gandhi (1982), which he shared with Billy Williams. He was also a two-time BAFTA Award nominee, for Gandhi and Cry Freedom (1987).

== Early life ==
Taylor was born on 27 October 1924 in Hampstead, London. At the age of 18 and in search of a job, Taylor pursued a radio operator certificate to find work with the Merchant Navy. However, a family neighbour, Jack Swinburne, offered to give Taylor a tour of Gainsborough Pictures Studio at Lime Grove in Shepherd Bush. After seeing how films were made, he quickly fell in love with the line of work and wanted to partake in the creation of films.

== Career ==
Taylor's first film was as a clapper boy in The Young Mr. Pitt (1942), that same year he entered the Merchant Navy. in service for the Second World War. After returning home, he continued working in the film industry. The following year, he pulled focus during the filming of the man in Grey (1943), solidifying the start of his career in the industry.

Taylor would then primarily shift to free-lance work. At times, he would work and would be contracted with studios like Pinewood Studios, Ealing Studio, and the Vera Cruz company. In his interview with David A. Ellis for his book Conversations with Cinematographers, Pinewood was mentioned as a personal favourite he had worked with and also where he would build a name for himself among his peers as a noteworthy operator.

In 1952, he would meet his future wife, Mary Devetta during the production of Secret People (1952) at Ealing Studios, West London. The two would move over to Brazil due to a two-year contract Taylor had signed with the Vera Cruz and stayed an additional two more years before the company closed.

Taylor moved back to Britain worked on projects and cemented a relationship with fellow cinematographer Freddie Francis. While not credited, he worked alongside the former on films such as Virgin Island (1958), Saturday Night and Sunday Morning (1960), and The Innocents (1961). Taylor would continue working on films and commercials as a freelancer operating on films. In 2001, at the age of 77, Taylor announced his retirement. He bought a property with a swimming pool in Ibiza, Spain, where he spent the rest of his life. Taylor continued his passion for film past his retirement, frequently participating in the Ibiza International Film Festival and was awarded the Ibiza IFF's achievement award.

Taylor had taken upon different fields of film, initially starting as a clapper boy, then working his way up to a camera operator where he spent most of his time in the field. In 1975, Taylor worked with director Ken Russel on Tommy (1975). Russel and film set Photographer Dick Bush got into a disagreement, leading to Dick leaving the project. Taylor took up the mantle and expanded his skill set into lighting and electrical work. This decision would lead to an expansion into television series production and commercial creation. While his catalogue of television production is less extensive than his filmography, he worked on TV series such as The Avengers (1965), Master of the Game (1984), and Jewels (1992).

After some time, he decided to transition into the Director of Photography.

Taylor's most notable accomplishment as a cinematographer was his work for Gandhi. During the production of Gandhi, the Director of Photography, Billy Williams BSC, had an incident, slipping his discs. Due to Taylor's relationship with Richard Attenborough from his time at Pinewood, Attenborough reached out to Taylor, asking him to help with the cinematography of Gandhi, taking over as the new Director of photography and continuing with this film. For his role in its production, Taylor won and shares an Oscar with the former director of photography, Williams. The pair also won the best cinematographer for the Academy Awards, British Academy Film Awards, and the British Society of Cinematographers.

Afterward, Taylor would continue working on films and commercials. It was through a chance meeting during the production of commercials that he came to become acquainted with Italian director Dario Argento. The two would pair up again and form a partnership. Taylor worked on three films with Argento: Phantom of the Opera (1998), and Sleepless (2001). Sleepless is marked as the final film in Taylor's filmography and decided to officially retire in 2001, at the age of 77. He bought a property in Ibiza, Spain where he spent the rest of his life. Taylor continued his passion for film past his retirement, frequently participating in the Ibiza International Film Festival and was awarded the Ibiza IFF's achievement award.

He is featured in the book Conversations with Cinematographers by David A Ellis, published by Scarecrow Press.

== Illness and death ==
In 2018, Taylor suffered a stroke and during his battle for recovery, his health deteriorated, eventually leading to subsequent health problems. Taylor died on 3 August 2018. He is survived by his two daughters, Tracey Taylor and Nikki Watson as well as two grandchildren.

== Filmography ==
=== Film ===
Year	Title	Director	Notes
1962	The War Lover	Philip Leacock	Aerial unit photography
1962	Two and Two Make Six	Freddie Francis	with Desmond Dickinson
1971	Murphy's War	Peter Yates	Aerial unit photography
1975	Tommy	Ken Russell	with Dick Bush
1976	The Return of a Man Called Horse	Irvin Kershner	Additional photography
1977	The Island of Dr. Moreau	Don Taylor	2nd unit photography
1978	Who'll Stop the Rain	Karel Reisz	Additional photography
1978	Circle of Iron	Richard Moore	
1981	Savage Harvest	Robert L. Collins	
1982	Gandhi	Richard Attenborough	with Billy Williams
1983	High Road to China	Brian G. Hutton	
1984	Champions	John Irvin	
1985	A Chorus Line	Richard Attenborough	
1986	Foreign Body	Ronald Neame	
1987	Opera	Dario Argento	
1987	Cry Freedom	Richard Attenborough	
1989	The Experts	Dave Thomas	
1989	Sea of Love	Harold Becker	
1990	The Rainbow Thief	Alejandro Jodorowsky	
1991	Popcorn	Mark Herrier	
1995	The Steal	John Hay	
1998	The Phantom of the Opera	Dario Argento	
2001	Sleepless	Dario Argento	

=== Television ===
Year	Title	Notes
1983	The Hound of the Baskervilles	TV movie
1984	Master of the Game	Miniseries
1984	Nairobi Affair	TV movie
1992	Jewels	Miniseries
1993	Age of Treason	TV movie
1994	Shadow of Obsession	TV movie
1994	Good King Wenceslas	TV movie
1995	Redwood Curtain	TV movie

=== Other work ===
- The Timekeeper (1992) - Circle-Vision 360° theme park attraction

== Awards and nominations ==
Institution	Year	Category	Work	Result	Ref.
Academy Awards	1983	Best Cinematography	Gandhi	Won	
British Academy Film Awards	1983	Best Cinematography	Gandhi	Nominated	
British Academy Film Awards	1988	Best Cinematography	Cry Freedom	Nominated	
British Society of Cinematographers	1982	Best Cinematography in a Theatrical Feature Film	Gandhi	Won	
