= DVD Verdict =

DVD review web site

- Website type: Film review
- Dissolved: 2020; 6 years ago
- Launched: 1999; 27 years ago
- Current status: Defunct

DVD Verdict was a judicial-themed website for DVD reviews. The site was founded in 1999. The editor-in-chief was Michael Stailey, who owned the website between 2004 and 2016, and the site employed a large editorial staff of critics, whose reviews were quoted by sources such as CBS Marketwatch, and were praised by such writers as Anthony Augustine of Uptown.

DVD Verdict also had four sister sites, titled Cinema Verdict, a theatrical movie review site, TV Verdict, a television review site, Pixel Verdict, a video game review site, and DVD Verdict Presents. The last reviews were published in 2017. The site went offline at the end of 2020.

== See also ==
- DVD Talk
