= Jamie McIntosh =

- Education: Master's degree in international human rights law
- Alma mater: University of Oxford
- Occupation: executive director
- Years active: 2002-present
- Organization: International Justice Mission Canada

Jamie McIntosh is the founder and former executive director of International Justice Mission (IJM) Canada, an organization dedicated to rescuing children from being exploited overseas. He has a master's degree in international human rights law from the University of Oxford.

== Organization ==
McIntosh founded the Canadian branch of IJM in 2002, after having spent a year and a half in prayer about how to alleviate oppression in other countries. Jacob Moon performed a benefit concert in Hamilton, Ontario for IJM Canada in 2006 after McIntosh recommended a book to him that made Moon aware of the organization. Also in 2006, McIntosh appeared before the Canadian House of Commons Standing Committee on Status of Women, calling the House of Commons to rescue female slaves in South Asia from their bondage.

== Human trafficking ==
At the 2008 Slavery in the 21st Century conference at Temple Emanu-El-Beth Sholom, McIntosh delivered a presentation entitled "When the Good Do Something: Countering Human Trafficking". At a 2011 contemporary-slavery-themed gathering at Douglas Park in Langley, British Columbia, McIntosh spoke about slavery on a global scale, while Mark Warawa and Peter Fassbender spoke to the issue on the provincial and local levels respectively. In 2012, McIntosh spoke about slavery and IJM at the Justice Summit at the Metropolitan Bible Church in Ontario. McIntosh is one of several Canadian abolitionists who have strongly endorsed Andrew Kooman's She Has a Name, a play toured across Canada in 2012 educating Canadians about human trafficking.
