= A Better World (organization) =

Canadian charitable organization

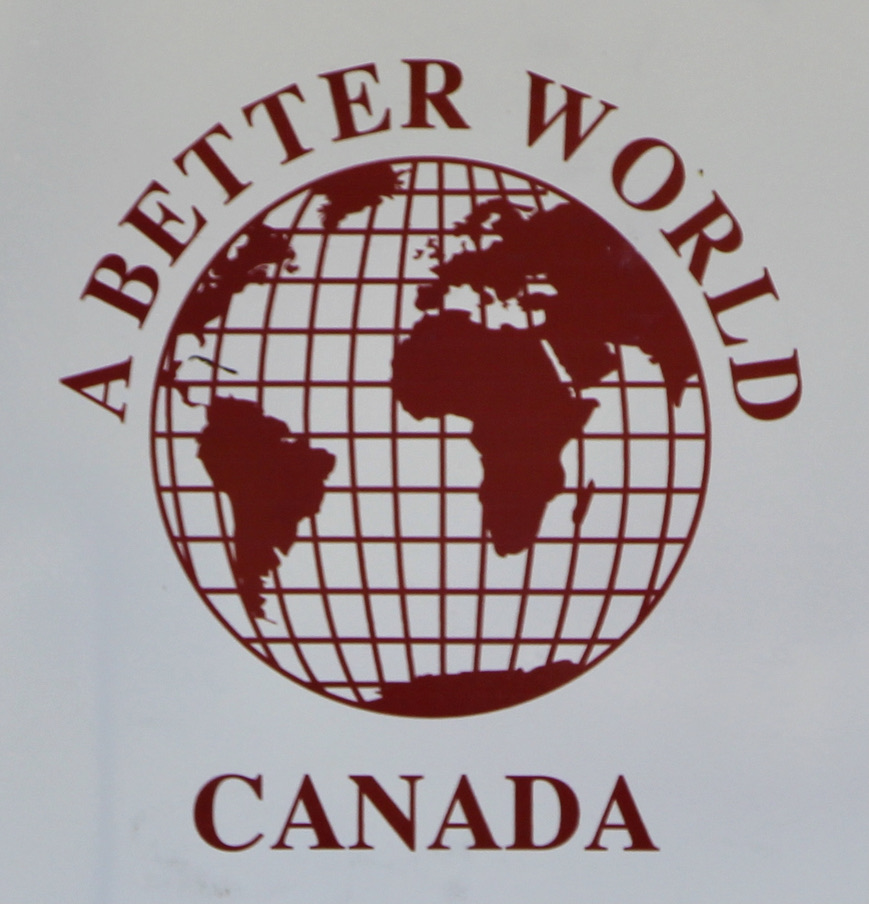
- Abbreviation: ABW
- Founded: 1990
- Type: NGO
- Purpose: Humanitarian
- Location: Lacombe, Alberta, Canada
- Official language: English
- Key people: Eric Rajah, Brian Leavitt
- Website: www.abwcanada.ca

A Better World (ABW) is an organization that is based in Lacombe, Alberta, Canada. It is a charitable organization, founded in 1990. Eric Rajah is one of the co-founders of ABW. More than 1800 people had volunteered on ABW projects by 2010.

== Projects ==
ABW has several projects in Kenya, including the support of a hospital in Maasai Mara. ABW has also provided humanitarian aid to Burmese refugees in India. In 2009, Cross Roads Church in Red Deer considered partnering with ABW on a project to give two internally displaced persons camps in Kosti, Sudan, access to a water source. In 2011, Azalea Lehndorff started the 100 Classroom Project, an ABW initiative that educates girls in Afghanistan. The goal of the project is to build 100 classrooms in Jowzjan Province in the space of three years.

ABW has also helped with building development of St Luke's Leprosarium, Peikulum in Tamil Nadu.

== Partnership with Raise Their Voice ==
ABW partnered with Raise Their Voice throughout the 2012 tour of Andrew Kooman's She Has a Name; while the play toured across Canada to raise awareness about human trafficking, ABW raised money to help women and children who had been trafficked in Thailand as part of the country's prostitution industry. Specifically, the money raised went to Home of New Beginnings, a safe house established in Bangkok in 2006, where former human trafficking victims can receive life skills-based education and spiritual healing, thereby allowing them to attain a healthy and financially stable lifestyle. At the time of the 2012 tour of the play, Home of New Beginnings had 17 residents, the oldest being 33 and the youngest being 11. From their fundraising initiative with Raise Their Voice, ABW hoped to raise $12000 to pay an outstanding property bill, $18000 to buy two auto rickshaws, $9000 to finance a training building, $9000 to buy vocational education equipment, and $5000 to finance a gift shop in which the residents sell products they have made, such as baked goods. All five members of Raise Their Voice had previous connections with ABW, and the plan to have the two organizations working in conjunction had been developing since 2011. The program passed out at each performance recommended ABW to audiences as a good organization to support, as well as listing the websites of several other nonprofit organizations.
