= John Winterdyk =

Canadian criminologist

- Born: 1953 (age 72–73)
- Education: Simon Fraser University (PhD)
- Scientific career
- Workplaces: Mount Royal University

John Winterdyk (born 1953) is a Canadian criminology professor emeritus at Mount Royal University in Calgary, Alberta. He is the university's Centre for Criminology and Justice Research chair.

He has spent much time in Sub-Saharan Africa studying local beliefs about violence and honour. He was the first person to receive a PhD in Criminology from the School of Criminology at Simon Fraser University. He later served as visiting scholar to the Max Planck Society in Freiburg im Breisgau, Germany. In 2010, Winterdyk conducted a study with several Canadian and international colleagues, and the study concluded that Canada is not doing as well as other democratic countries in the Western world in preparing its law enforcement officers to address the issue of people smuggling. Winterdyk wrote a book called Human Trafficking: Exploring the International Nature, Concerns, and Complexities and signed copies of the book at an event at Mount Royal University on February 16, 2012, which also included a speech by Yvon Dandurand on the subject of human trafficking, and a reading of the play She Has a Name by Andrew Kooman.

== Selected works ==
- Jones, Jackie; Winterdyk, John, eds. (2018). Human Trafficking: Challenges and Opportunities the 21st Century. LAP LAMBERT Academic Publishing. ISBN 978-6139852406.
