= Scott Block Theatre =

- Interactive map of Scott Block Theatre
- Address: Red Deer, Alberta
- Coordinates: 52.2678°N 113.8144°W

Website
- http://www.scottblock.ca/

The Scott Block Theatre (also known as The Scott Block) is a theatre in Red Deer, Alberta, Canada. It is located downtown. It was remodelled in 2010 to host a monthly show called the Red Deer Cabaret. It has hosted a variety of plays, including Cathleen Rootseart's Choke, Andrew Kooman's She Has a Name, and Alexandra Mihill's Dead Lover's Day. It has also hosted concerts by a variety of artists, including Into Eternity, Anvil, Titans Eve, and Day One. The Scott Block Theatre has hosted competitions, such as Scriptease, a theatre competition; and the Bikram Yoga Alberta Regional Championships, a yoga competition. Comedian Roman Danylo has performed at the theatre as well.
