= Ibiza International Film Festival =

Ibiza International Film Festival (Ibiza IFF) is an independent cinema event which takes place every spring on the Island[Sponsors were John Hurt, Terry Gilliam, Sir Alan Parker, Bigas Luna and Ángela Molina. At the 2nd edition of the Festival, Nacho Cano and Antonio Isasi-Isasmendi joined as Sponsors and José Manuel Lorenzo assumed the role of President of the Consulting Committee.

With the slogan The independent spirit, suggested by the Producer Jonathan Debin, this Festival promotes independent productions worldwide. Its award and symbol is the Falcó d'Or, representing an Eleonora's falcon, a species which nests freely on the cliffs of Ibiza and Formentera and which recalls The Maltese Falcon, by John Huston.

== 2011 edition ==
V edition takes place from 4 to 8 May 2011 with Val Kilmer as the president of the Jury.

=== List of winners ===
Competitive section

- Best film – Magic City Memoirs by Aaron K. Salgado
- Best director – Ed Gass-Donnelly for Small Town Murder Songs
- Best actor (ex aequo) – J.R. Villareal, Michael Cardelle & Andrés Domínguez for Magic City Memoirs
- Best actress – Melinda Shankar for Festival Of Lights
- Best supporting actor – Jo Kelly for I Want To Be A Soldier
- Best direction of photography – Dmitri Mass for “Ne Skazhu” (I'm Not Telling)
- Best script – Aaron J. Salgado & J. D. Freixas for Magic City Memoirs
- Best soundtrack – Anton Baybok & Igor Vdovin for “Ne Skazhu” (I'm Not Telling)
- Special Jury Award – Jackie Burroughs for Small Town Murder Songs
- Special Mention – Fergus Riordan for I Want To Be A Soldier

Honorary awards

- Independent Spirit prize – “LA RAFLE” by Rose Bosch
- Antonio Isasi-Isasmendi Award – Francis Ford Coppola
- Vicente Ribas Award – Royal Academy of Dramatic Art (RADA)

Balearic Spirit section

- SOM TAUJÀ by Borja Zausen

== 2010 edition ==
At its IV edition, the Festival Jury comprised Jacqueline Bisset as president, Carlos Bardem and Antonio Isasi.

=== List of winners ===
Competitive section

- Best film – 18 Years Later, by Edoardo Leo
- Best director- Edoardo Leo for 18 Years Later
- Best actor - Edoardo Leo for 18 Years Later
- Best actress - Sabrina Impacciatore for 18 Years Later
- Best supporting actor - Rik Barnett for Rebels without a Clue
- Best supporting Actress - Cat Dowling for "Rebels without a clue"
- Best direction of photography- Rebels without a Clue
- Best script - Marco Bonini y Edoardo Leo por Eighteen years later
- Best soundtrack - Rebels without a Clue
- Special Falcó D'Or award – Eighteen years later, de Edoardo Leo

Honorary awards

- Independent Spirit prize - Backyard, by Carlos Herrero
- "Vicente Ribas" Award for the Promotion of Cinema - Academia de las Artes y las Ciencias Cinematográficas de España

Balearic Spirit section

- First Prize - Dificultades, by Joan Cobos and Laura Martin

== 2009 edition ==
At its IIIrd edition, the Festival Jury comprised Cuba Gooding Jr. as president, Scottish filmmaker Bill Forsyth and Spanish critic José Eduardo Arenas.

=== List of winners ===
Competitive section

- Best film - Li Tong, by Nian Liu
- Best director - Nian Liu for Li Tong
- Best actor - Nenad Jezdic for Tears for sale
- Best actress - Zhicun Zhao for Li Tong
- Best supporting actor - Kang Yao for Li Tong
- Best production design- Tears for sale
- Best direction of photography- Dark Streets
- Best script - Nian Liu for Li Tong
- Best editing - Kevin Fritz, and Nian Liu for Li Tong
- Best soundtrack - George Accogny for Dark Streets
- Special jury award - Uros Stojanovic for Tears for sale
- Special Falcó D'Or award - Nian Liu for Li Tong

Honorary awards

- Independent Spirit Prize - La Milagrosa, by Rafa Lara
- "Vicente Ribas" Award for the Promotion of Cinema - Berlinale

Special awards

- Audience award - A shine of rainbows, by Vic Sarin
- New Director award - Darren Grodsky and Danny Jacobs for Humboldt County

Balearic Spirit section The jury of this section comprised Antonio Isasi-Isasmendi and Carles Fabregat

- First Prize - Microfísica, by Joan Carles Martorell
- Accesit - "Se vende", by Mapi Galán

Videoclips section The jury of this section comprised Michael Hoenig and Anjula Acharia-Bath

- Best videoclip - SIA Soon will be found, by Claire Carre
- Best Special Effects - Kanye West, Welcome to the Heartbreak, by Nabil

== 2008 edition ==
At its IInd edition, the Festival Jury comprised Michael Radford, Armand Assante, Margarita Chapatte, Michael Nyman, Richard Kwietnioski, Ray Loriga and Uri Fruchtmann.

=== List of winners ===
Competitive section

- Best Film - Battle in Seattle (USA/Canada/Germany)
- Best Director - Marco Carniti for Sleeping around
- Best Actor - Josh Lucas in Death in love
- Best Actress - Jacqueline Bisset in Death in love
- Best Supporting Actor - Enrique Murciano in Mancora
- Best Script - Boaz Yakim for Death in love
- Best Photography - Paolo Ferrari for Sleeping around
- Best Production Design - Emita Frigato for Sleeping around
- Best Edition - Fernando Villena for Battle in Seattle
- Best Sound Track - D. Barittoni y G. De Caterini for Sleeping around
- Best Short Film - Tibor Martin for The power of free
- Falcó D'or - Anna Galiena for Sleeping around
- Special Audience Prize - Lilian and Pedro Rosado for La Mala
- Special Jury Prize - Sleeping around

Honorary awards

- Film Career - Antonio Isasi-Isasmendi
- Special Independent Spirit Prize - Gerardo Olivares for 14 Kilómetros
- Film Promotion "Premio Vicente Ribas" - La Cinémathèque de la Danse

== 2007 edition ==
At the Ibiza IFF Ist edition the Jury comprised Antonio Isasi-Isasmendi as president, Jonathan Debin, Michael Hoenig, Ronnie Taylor, Igor Fioravanti, Demián Bichir, Steve Norman, Anwen Rees Hurt, Timothy Burrill, Elfie A. Donnelly and Paul Arató.

=== List of winners ===
Competitive section

- Best International Film - La Caja (Spain)
- Best coproduced Film - The moon and the stars (Hungary/Italy/UK)
- Best Director - Steve Barron for Choking Man
- Best Brand New Director - A.J. Annila for Jade Warrior
- Best Actor - Toby Jones in Infamous
- Best Actress - Ángela Molina in La Caja
- Best Supporting Actor - Alfred Molina in The moon and the stars
- Best Supporting Actress - Elvira Minguez in La caja
- Most Promising New Male Artist - Octavio Gómez in Choking Man
- Most Promising New Female Artist - Eugenia Yuan in Choking Man
- Best Scenography - Jade Warrior (Finland/China)
- Best Photography Direction - Henri Blomberg for Jade Warrior
- Best Script - Peter Barnes and Fabio Carpi for The moon and the stars
- Special Jury Prize - Choking Man (USA)
- Special Mention Jury Prize - California Dreamin' (Romania)
- The Independent Spirit Prize - Longest night in Shanghai (Japan/China)
- Best Sound Track - Nico Muhly for Choking Man

Honorary awards

- Film Career - John Hurt
- Freedom of Expression - George Clooney for Good Night, and Good Luck
- Film Promotion "Premio Vicente Ribas" - INCAA
- Creativity Prize - Terry Gilliam
