= Stephen Waldschmidt =

American actor

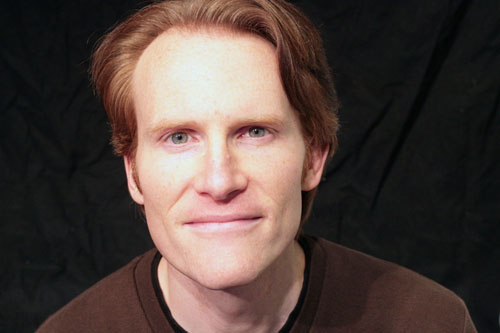
- Born: Cleveland, Ohio
- Writing career
- Genre: Comedy
- Notable work: Hockey Dad

Stephen Waldschmidt is an actor, playwright, theatre director, scenic designer and graphic designer originally from Cleveland, Ohio, United States.

== Theatre career ==
Stephen Waldschmidt is an actor, playwright, theatre director, scenic designer, graphic designer, and stay-at-home dad originally from Cleveland, Ohio, United States. He is known for portraying Jesus in the Canadian Badlands Passion Play in Drumheller, a part that he has played five times. He also performed as Greville in the premiere of A Bright Particular Star. As a scenic designer, he designed the set for a 2007 performance of The Quarrel and a revolving set for a 2009 performance of Lettice and Lovage. As a playwright, he wrote Hockey Dad: A Play in 3 Periods with James Popoff. He is one of Burnt Thicket Theatre's artistic associates.

=== She Has a Name ===
In 2010, Waldschmidt attended a presentation by Andrew Kooman in Strathmore about human trafficking. The location of Kooman's presentation was Waldschmidt's home church. Kooman mentioned She Has a Name, a play that he had written about human trafficking, and Waldschmidt soon asked Kooman for permission to read the script. Waldschmidt felt drawn to address the issue of human trafficking even before discovering She Has a Name and had gotten involved with some fair trade initiatives. Waldschmidt attested to his feet sweating after having first read the script and said that it was one of only two scripts that he had ever read that he could not put down before finishing. Nonetheless, he initially backed off from the play because of the immensity and ugliness of the issue. Eventually, however, he and Kooman worked together on the script, expanding it to a full-length play with an extra hour's worth of material by the end of 2010, resulting in a play that can be performed in ninety minutes but may last up to two hours. Kooman and Waldschmidt were moved to continue working on the play because of worldwide human trafficking statistics; namely, that 800000 people are trafficked across international borders each year, that there are 10 million children forced to work in the sex industry, that 1 million of these are child prostitutes, and that sex traffickers have an average annual income of $280000 per victim. Waldschmidt directed the premiere of She Has a Name, a performance for which he also served as scenic designer. He was also the director for the 2012 tour of She Has a Name.
