= Supervized =

2019 comedy superhero film

- Theatrical release poster
- Directed by: Steve Barron
- Written by: Andy Briggs; John Niven
- Produced by: Steve Barron; Kieran Corrigan
- Starring: Tom Berenger; Beau Bridges; Fionnula Flanagan; Louis Gossett Jr.; Elya Baskin; Fiona Glascott
- Cinematography: Sam Renton
- Edited by: Catherine Creed; Mark Davies
- Music by: Ed Harcourt
- Distributed by: Freestyle Releasing
- Release dates: 19 July 2019 (United States); 12 December 2019 (Worldwide)
- Running time: 84 minutes
- Countries: Ireland; United Kingdom
- Language: English

Supervized is a 2019 comedy superhero film directed by Steve Barron. The film was produced by Barron and Kieran Corrigan, and stars Tom Berenger, Beau Bridges, Fionnula Flanagan, Louis Gossett Jr., Elya Baskin and Fiona Glascott. It was released on July 19, 2019, in the United States, under a limited showing and on video on demand, and December 12, 2019, worldwide.

== Plot ==
Ray lives in Dunmanor, a retirement home for the International Superhero Federation in Ireland. He is embittered by the fact that the public has largely forgotten him, and even his own grandchildren are rather fond of a new superhero, Celestro.

During a birthday party for one of the residents, Hurricane Jane, another resident, Jerry, gets out of control. The incident prompts Alicia, the facility's warden, to have Jerry's powers "downwardly managed". A short time after the procedure, Jerry dies, making Ray suspicious. When Dunmanor's residents attend Hero Day at the nearby town, Ray spots some youths using Jerry's powers. Thinking that the administration of the retirement home is stealing and selling superpowers, Ray asks Celestro for help, but he doesn't want to get involved. So Ray and his former sidekick Ted sneak off the bus to investigate. They are trying to tail the youths and end up interrupting a car theft. Their misinterpreted actions are covered in a local newspaper, causing Alicia to announce that Ray will be downwardly managed. The other residents are tested for their power control level and almost all ordered to be downwardly managed also.

Ray's friends don't believe in a conspiracy behind this, but Ted finds papers mentioning a person with an ability to absorb superpowers and blueprints of an unknown machine in the administration office. Ray confronts Alicia with this information, but has no evidence, and is therefore prepared for the procedure. Meanwhile, Ray's friends see one of the orderlies levitating via Jerry's powers. It is revealed that the orderly Flynn has the power-absorption ability, which Alicia uses for her machine. To get some extra money, Flynn sold a bit of Jerry's extracted powers as a drug to the locals. Alicia sends Flynn to get all the vials back. While the other residents stall the personnel, Ray, Pendle, Madera and Ted start to chase Flynn, but are unable to go past the security lasers that Brian and Windsor couldn't shut down. After Dolores freezes the surrounding moat, the elderly superheroes finally leave the guarded territory and take a taxi to the youth club.

There they find the delinquent who was buying the drug and interrogate him. He directs them back to the retirement home, where Alicia has already apprehended the rest of the residents. She transfers Flynn's power to herself and starts to absorb the powers of the superheroes. Alicia reveals that her parents died in a building that collapsed in one of Ray's battles with supervillains, and her plan is to combine all the superpowers and mother a powerful super-being who will be able to defeat other superpowered individuals. Ray and his friends lose the fight with Alicia, but her body can't stand so many different superpowers and disintegrates. The superheroes celebrate their victory and hold a press conference.

== Cast ==
- Tom Berenger - Raymond Windesky, aka Maximum Justice, a superhero with telekinesis and laser vision powers
- Beau Bridges - Ted, aka Shimmy, Ray's sidekick who can teleport leaving behind a foul odor
- Fionnula Flanagan - Madera Moonlight, a new resident of Dunmanor, love interest of Ray and Pendle, and superheroine who uses energy from the negative dimension
- Louis Gossett Jr. - Pendle Carpenter, aka Total Thunder, a superhero with superspeed
- Elya Baskin - Brian, a former supervillain with enhanced senses and deformation powers, immigrant from USSR who chose to cooperate with the CIA
- Fiona Glascott - Alicia, Dunmanor retirement home's warden
- John Kavanagh - Windsor, a wheelchaired superhero with pyrokinesis
- Aaron Heffernan - Flynn, an orderly with the ability to absorb superpowers
- Clive Russell - Jerry, aka Glasgow Rainbow, a superhero with energy manipulation superpowers
- Ned Dennehy - Griffin, an orderly with a drug addiction
- Hiran Abeysekera - Celestro, an LGBT superhero who can fly
- Sheila Flitton - Hurricane Jane, a superheroine with super breath
- Charlie Kranz - Michael, Ray's son
- Paul Tylak - Sidney Scoop, a journalist
- Noel O'Donovan - Bernard, aka Alter-Man, a superhero with the ability to transform objects
- Rynagh O'Grady - Dolores, a superheroine with the power of temperature control
- Amanda Stuart Heaney - Eagle Wings, a superheroine who can fly
- Jer O'Leary - Lars
- Megan Day - Gwyneth
- Conall Keating - Lynch
- Lochlann Ó Mearáin - Kevin

== See also ==
- List of superhero films
