= Choking Man =

- Choking Man Theatrical Poster
- Directed by: Steve Barron
- Written by: Steve Barron
- Produced by: Steve Barron; Zachary Mortensen; Joshua Zeman
- Starring: Octavio Gómez Berríos; Eugenia Yuan; Aaron Paul; Mandy Patinkin
- Cinematography: Steve Barron
- Edited by: Steve Barron; Joshua Zeman; Zachary Mortensen
- Music by: Nico Muhly
- Distributed by: International Film Circuit
- Release date: April 2006 (Tribeca Film Festival)
- Running time: 83 minutes
- Country: United States
- Languages: English, Spanish

Choking Man is a 2006 drama film, written and directed by Steve Barron. The film stars Octavio Gómez Berríos and Eugenia Yuan.

== Synopsis ==
Choking Man is an intense blend of psychological drama and magical realism that encapsulates the contemporary immigrant experience in America. Jorge (Octavio Gómez Berríos) is a morbidly shy Ecuadorian dishwasher toiling away in a shabby diner in Jamaica, Queens run by Rick (Mandy Patinkin). He works all day long in the shadow of the ever-present Heimlich maneuver instruction poster which hangs in the diner kitchen. From his solitary kitchen corner, Jorge gropes mutely for a bond with Amy (Eugenia Yuan), the newly hired Chinese waitress and even though she tries to reciprocate, the gulf that separates them may be too large. On the job he is continually tormented by his coworker Jerry (Aaron Paul) and at home in his Harlem boarding house, under the psychological control of his late uncle, who was truly like a father to him. His uncle was described as being the only caring person in Jorge's life. He battles his inner demons. Set in the vicinity of JFK airport, the most culturally diverse neighborhood in the world, Choking Man captures the feeling of claustrophobia some newcomers to America experience as they struggle to find a place and purpose in this strange land.

== Reception ==
Choking Man had a mixed reception by critics.

== Soundtrack ==
The score to Choking Man was composed by Nico Muhly.

== Awards ==
- Best Film Not Playing at a Theater Near You Award, 16th Annual Gotham Awards, 2006
- Best Director, Best Newcomers Octavio Gómez Berríos & Eugenia Yuan, Best Soundtrack Nico Muhly, Special Jury Award, Ibiza International Film Festival, 2007
