= The Eye 2 =

2004 Hong Kong film by the Pang brothers

- Film poster
- 見鬼2
- Directed by: Danny Pang; Oxide Pang
- Screenplay by: Jojo Hui
- Story by: Jojo Hui; Lawrence Cheng
- Produced by: Peter Chan; Lawrence Cheng; Jojo Hui
- Starring: Shu Qi; Eugenia Yuan; Jesdaporn Pholdee
- Cinematography: Decha Srimantra
- Edited by: Danny Pang; Oxide Pang
- Music by: Payont Termsit
- Production companies: Mediacorp Raintree Pictures; Applause
- Distributed by: Go Film (Hong Kong); Fortissimo Films (International)
- Release date: 8 March 2004
- Running time: 94 minutes
- Country: Hong Kong
- Language: Cantonese

The Eye 2 (見鬼2) is a 2004 Hong Kong supernatural horror film directed and edited by Danny and Oxide Pang. It is a standalone sequel to The Eye (2002). Produced by Mediacorp Raintree Pictures and Applause, the film was released in Hong Kong on 8 March 2004.

== Synopsis ==
Believing she is being rejected by her boyfriend Sam, Joey attempts suicide with sleeping pills, but recovers after having her stomach pumped. When she looks forward to a brand new life, she discovers that she is pregnant. Being tortured by the thought of an abortion and unable to contact Sam, Joey finds herself becoming delusional and emotionally unstable.

Joey begins to see the spirits of dead people, and also feels she is being stalked by a mysterious ghost woman. She believes the ghost wants to hurt her unborn baby. As the story unfolds, it is discovered that the ghost is Sam's wife who committed suicide by jumping in front of an oncoming train. She is now awaiting Joey's baby's birth so that she may be reincarnated within her.

After discovering this, Joey would rather kill herself and her baby than let this woman become her child. While in a hospital, awaiting the birth of her child, Joey jumps off the building twice, but survives both times. She gives birth in the end, realizing the terms with her situation.

Her psychiatrist's explanation is that Joey feels guilty about Sam's wife's suicide. Finally she accepts this responsibility, no longer recognizing Sam and disillusioned about her baby's father.

As Joey checks out of the hospital, the camera pans across a room of expecting mothers, each with a ghost hovering by their sides.

== Cast ==
- Shu Qi as Joey Cheng
- Eugenia Yuan as Yuen Chi-kei
- Jesdaporn Pholdee as Sam
- Philip Kwok as the monk
- Rayson Tan as the gynaecologist
- May Phua as the policewoman in the report centre
- Alan Tern as the policeman in the hospital

== Release ==
The film was released in theatres in Hong Kong and Thailand on 18 March 2004, and in Singapore on 25 March, earning $740,514 on its opening weekend, setting a new record for a horror film in Singapore. In the Philippines, the film was released on 19 May.

=== Home media ===
The film was released on VCD in May 2004.

== Reception ==
Ong Sor Fern of The Straits Times gave the movie three and a half stars out of five: "While this does not exactly hit the bull's eye dead centre, at least it is not an unfocused mess". Wendy Teo of The New Paper gave the film three stars out of five, praising the performances of Shu Qi and Yuan, while criticising the plot as only being a slight modification from the formula of the first film.

== See also ==
- List of ghost films
