= Noel O'Donovan (actor) =

Irish actor (1949–2019)

- Born: 6 December 1949
- Died: 13 September 2019 (aged 69); Dublin, Ireland
- Occupation: Actor
- Years active: 1970–2017
- Spouse: Bairbre Ní Fhloinn
- Children: 3

Noel O'Donovan (6 December 1949 – 13 September 2019) was an Irish actor.

O'Donovan grew up in Cork, Ireland. In the 1960s, he went to London, where worked as a labourer. Soon after, he found work at the Saville Theatre in the West End. In 1970, he returned to Ireland and joined the Abbey Theatre's acting school.

He died in the Mater Hospital in Dublin in September 2019.

== Selective filmography ==
=== Film ===
Year	Title	Role	Notes		
1984	Anne Devlin	Tom Halpin			
1986	Rawhead Rex	Mitch Har			
1986	Eat the Peach	Local			
1990	The Field	Tomás			
1992	Far and Away	Matthew			
1996	Trojan Eddie	Arthur	2010	Leap Year	Arthur
2019	Supervized	Bernard			

=== Television ===
Year	Title	Role	Notes
1997	EastEnders	Flynn	2 episodes
1998	The Ambassador	Jackie Norris	Episode: "Innocent Passage"
