= Eric Rajah =

Canadian businessman and humanitarian (born 1958)

Eric Rajah AOE, MSM
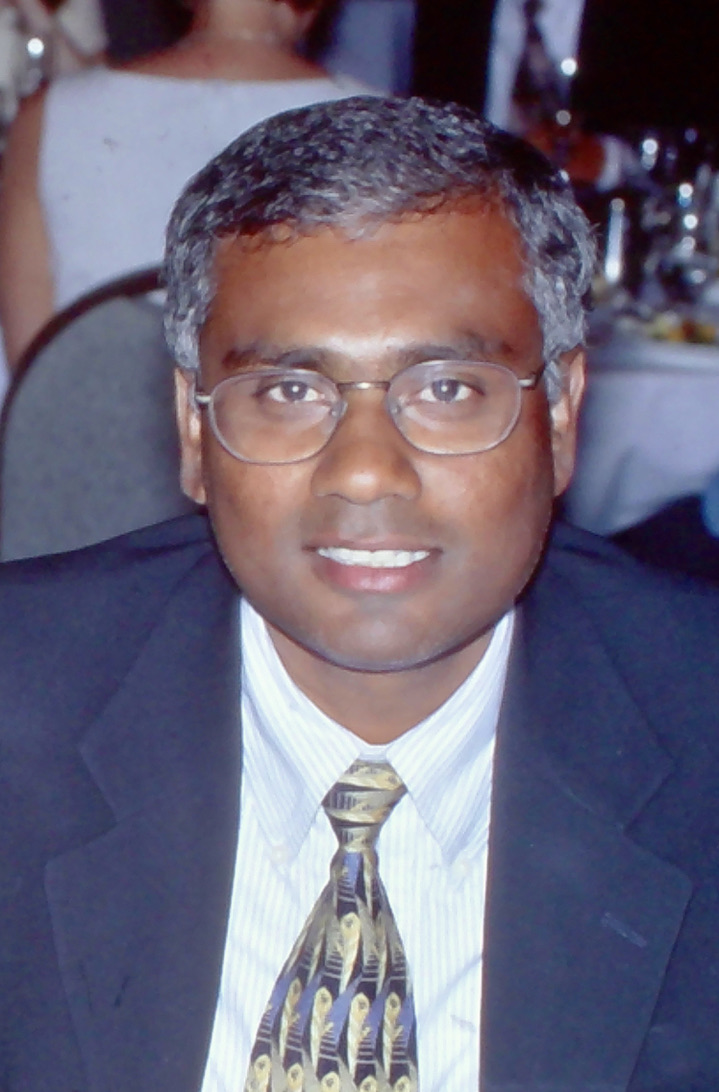
- Born: 12 January 1958 (age 67); Jaffna, Sri Lanka
- Education: Canadian Union College (BTh)
- Occupation(s): Advanced Systems (President and owner)
- Organization(s): A Better World (President and co-founder)
- Spouse: Candyce Schafer
- Children: 2
- Website: https://ericrajah.ca/

Eric Rajah (born January 12, 1958) is a Sri Lankan-born Canadian businessman and humanitarian based in Lacombe, Alberta.

== Early life and education ==
Eric Rajah was born in Jaffna, Sri Lanka, on January 12, 1958, as the eldest out of three sons to M. S. and Florence Rajah. In 1974, he and his mother and brothers moved to Vancouver, Canada, to join his father, who had immigrated earlier.

Rajah graduated from Winston Churchill High School in Vancouver in 1976. He then enrolled in the business program at the University of British Columbia. In 1978, he transferred to Canadian Union College (CUC)—now Burman University—in Lacombe, Alberta. He graduated with a Bachelor of Theology in 1981.

== Career ==
After graduating from college, Rajah served as the student finance officer at CUC and later worked in Red Deer as an accountant aiming to qualify as a chartered accountant.

Rajah launched his business venture, 'The Computer Training Centre Inc' (CTC), later known as Advanced Systems (AS), in 1986, providing training on computer operating systems and business software for organizations and non-profits. AS is currently located in Lacombe and Red Deer, Alberta.

In 1990, Rajah co-founded A Better World (ABW), an organization focused on supporting development in developing countries.

== Personal life ==
After becoming a Canadian citizen in 1985, Rajah married Candyce Schafer of Lacombe. They have two sons, Brenden and Jaden. He is a member of the Seventh-day Adventist Church.

== Awards and honours ==
=== Alberta Order of Excellence ===
Rajah was inducted into the Alberta Order of Excellence (AOE) in 2011, gaining the Queen Elizabeth II's Platinum Jubilee Medal in 2022.

=== Meritorious Service Medal (Civil Division) ===
In 2021, Rajah and Leavitt were announced as recipients of the Meritorious Service Medal (Civil Division) [MSM] from the Governor General of Canada for founding ABW Canada. Due to the COVID-19 pandemic, Rajah and Leavitt did not officially receive the MSM until May 2024.

=== Honorary Doctor of Laws degree ===
In May 2014, Andrews University in Michigan conferred the honorary Doctor of Laws (LL.D.) degree on Rajah. He was also the commencement speaker for two of the university's graduation ceremonies.
