= Rik Barnett =

English actor

Rik Barnett (born 20 March 1990) is an English actor, and the 2010 winner of the best supporting actor award from Ibiza International Film Festival, for his work in Rebels Without a Clue.

== Life and career ==
Barnett was born in Macclesfield, England, the son of Deborah, a chef, and Peter, who has his own building company. Rik Barnett attended City College Manchester formerly 'The Shena Simon Performing Arts School' in Manchester, where he earned distinctions in acting. He then attended the Lee Strasberg Theatre and Film Institute in Los Angeles. He has previously acted for ITV and Ealing Studios. In 2012, he graduated from his acting program at UCLA.

In 2010, Barnett worked on the Independent film Rebels Without A Clue, working alongside such actors as Doctor Who's John Leeson. It was his work in this film that earned him the Best Supporting Actor award at Ibiza International Film Festival, some of the former recipients of this award have been Enrique Murciano and Alfred Molina. Actress Jacqueline Bisset who was Jury President along with Carlos Bardem presented the award.

Rebels Without A Clue was also nominated for Best UK Feature at Raindance Film Festival, showing at Apollo Cinema: Piccadilly Circus, and was screened during Cannes Film Festival.

One reviewer reported that Barnett's performance was "glorious to watch", another said that "Barnett, who plays Mark, (or 'wanker', as he is affectionately referred to throughout) is able to switch seamlessly between the genuinely touching dialogue about his father to keeping up with dim-witted banter".

In September 2012 Barnett was featured on the cover of the Thai lifestyle magazine OUT In Thailand.

In 2013 Barnett worked alongside filmmaker Jonathan Sheldon on the "Fifty Shades of Grey Gardens" spoof for Funny or Die Currently he is working on his own play 'Bosie'. He is also a monthly contributor to Prodijee, an Australian magazine.

== Personal life ==
It was reported in a 26 May 2012 story in the Omaha World-Herald newspaper, that Barnett was engaged to be married to Tony Award-winning Broadway producer Adam Epstein, one of the producers of the original Broadway musical production of Hairspray.

Barnett uses swimming to manage stress, to focus and to learn his lines.

== List of credits ==
=== Films ===
Year	Title	Role	Notes
2013	Romney: 2012	Narrator	United States Thunk Enterprises
2010	Rebels Without A Clue	Mark	Independent UK
2011	Bird	Matt	UCLA School of Theater, Film and Television
2010	HART	Lawrence	Ealing Studios

=== Theatre ===
Year	Title	Role	Notes
2012	Bosie -Reading-	Bosie	AE Company
2010	The Poseidon	Robert	Orlin ProductionsUK
2010	Pygmalion	Freddy Eynsford Hill	Little Theatre, Cheshire UK
2009	The Caucasian Chalk Circle	The Singer	CCM ProductionsUK
2009	Animal Farm	Moses	RSC UK
2009	Christmas Carol	Bob Cratchit	CCM Productions, UK
2008	Romeo & Juliet	Romeo	RSC Productions, UK
2008	Miss Julie	Jean	CCM Productions, UK
2008	Twelfth Night	Sebastian (Twelfth Night)	CCM Productions, RSC Production, UK
2008	The Train	Ensemble	CCM ProductionsUK

=== Radio and commercial ===
Year	Title	Role	Notes
2010	A to Z -Commercial-	Bumper Car Boy	Vodafone Telecom
2010	The Poseidon -Radio-	Robert	Orlin Productions UK BBC
2010	Hearing Dogs for Deaf People -Commercial-	Narrator	UK Polka Dot Productions

=== New Media ===
Year	Title	Role	Notes
2013	Fifty Shades of Grey Gardens -Funny Or Die-	Christian Grey	United States Thunk Enterprises
