= Anne Waldschmidt =

German sociologist

Anne Waldschmidt (born 1958) is a German sociologist. She is a professor at the University of Cologne and teaches disability studies and sociology and politics of rehabilitation. She holds the first university position for disability studies in German-speaking countries.

== Biography ==
Waldschmidt studied social sciences at the universities of Bremen, Germany, and Edinburgh, Scotland (1978–84). She worked as a social worker for a non-governmental charity organisation (1985–88), at the German Parliament as a scientific consultant in the field of genetic and reproductive technologies for the Green Party (1988–91), and as a research fellow at the University of Siegen, Germany (1992–95). In 1995 she received her PhD (Dr. rer. pol.) from Bremen University, funded by the private foundation Hans-Böckler-Stiftung. Her thesis The Subject in Human Genetics: Expert Discourses on the Agendas and Concepts for Human Genetic Counseling 1945-1990 was published in 1996; this book is now out of print. She undertook post-doctoral research at the universities of Siegen and Dortmund (1996–2000). Her second book Self-Determination as a Construction: Subjective Theories of Women and Men with Disabilities was published in 1999. In 2000-02 Anne Waldschmidt served as a professor of social sciences at the Protestant University of Applied Sciences Nuremberg. In 2002 she was appointed to a professorship of sociology of disability at the University of Cologne (Germany). In 2004 Waldschmidt established iDiS, the International research unit Disability Studies. In December 2008 the Faculty of Human Sciences at the University of Cologne renamed her position in “Sociology and Politics of Rehabilitation, Disability Studies”.

Waldschmidt is chief-editor of the scientific book series Disability Studies: Body – Power - Difference (since 2007), in cooperation with Thomas Macho, other colleagues and the German publisher transcript, Bielefeld (Germany). Her book publications by include the co-edition of the international section "Disability Studies in German Speaking Countries", in: Disability Studies Quarterly. The first journal in the field of disability studies, 2006, volume 26, number 2, the co-edited collection "Disability Studies, Sociology of Culture, and Sociology of Disability: Investigations in a new research field", the co-authored book "The Knowledge of the People. Bioethics, everyday life, and power on the Internet”, and the co-edited collection "Disability History: Constructions of disability in history. An introduction". She also co-edited the collection “Culture – Theory – Disability: Encounters between Disability Studies and Cultural Studies”. As co-editor in 2018 she published the collection “Understanding the Lived Experiences of Persons with Disabilities in Nine Countries. Active Citizenship and Disability in Europe Volume 2”, which resulted from the EU research project “DISCIT”.

In May, 2008 Waldschmidt was a visiting fellow at the Centre for Biomedicine & Society, King's College, London (UK). From October to December 2008 she was guest professor at the Department of Special Education, Stockholm University (Sweden), and during the summer term of 2010 she was visiting research professor at the Centre for Disability Studies, University of Leeds (UK). In the summer term 2011 Professor Waldschmidt was visiting professor at the University of Vienna (Austria). From 2007 until 2015 Waldschmidt was a member of the Academic Network of European Disability experts (ANED). From 2013 until 2016 she was also a member of the EU research consortium “Making Persons with Disabilities Full Citizens – New Knowledge for an Inclusive and Sustainable Social Model (DISCIT)”.

In 2019, she hosted the international conference "Histories, Practices and Policies of Disability" at the University of Cologne, in collaboration with ALTER, European Society for Disability Research. From 2018 until 2021 Waldschmidt conducts the research project “Dispositifs of ‘Dis/ability’ in Transformation. (Employed) work as biographical experience and everyday practice in the context of dis/ability” (funded by German Research Foundation).

Waldschmidt's research focuses on sociological aspects of human genetics and reproductive technologies; bio-politics and autonomy; normality, deviance, and disability; political participation, self-help organisations, and disability movements; health and social policy; disability policy in Europe and internationally; the sociology of knowledge; sociology of the body; gender studies, diversity studies; discourse analysis and qualitative empirical research.
