= Ten Silver Coins =

2009 novel written by Andrew Kooman

- Author: Andrew Kooman
- Language: English
- Series: Jill Strong Series
- Subject: Forced migration
- Genre: Fantasy
- Publication date: 2009
- Publication place: Canada
- Media type: Novel

Ten Silver Coins: The Drylings of Acchora is a young adult novel written by Andrew Kooman. It is a fantasy novel and its protagonist is Jill Strong. Ten Silver Coins was Kooman's debut novel. Kooman wrote the majority of the book in 2004 while working in Asia. It is the first novel in a three-novel series.
