= Britta Waldschmidt-Nelson =

German historian

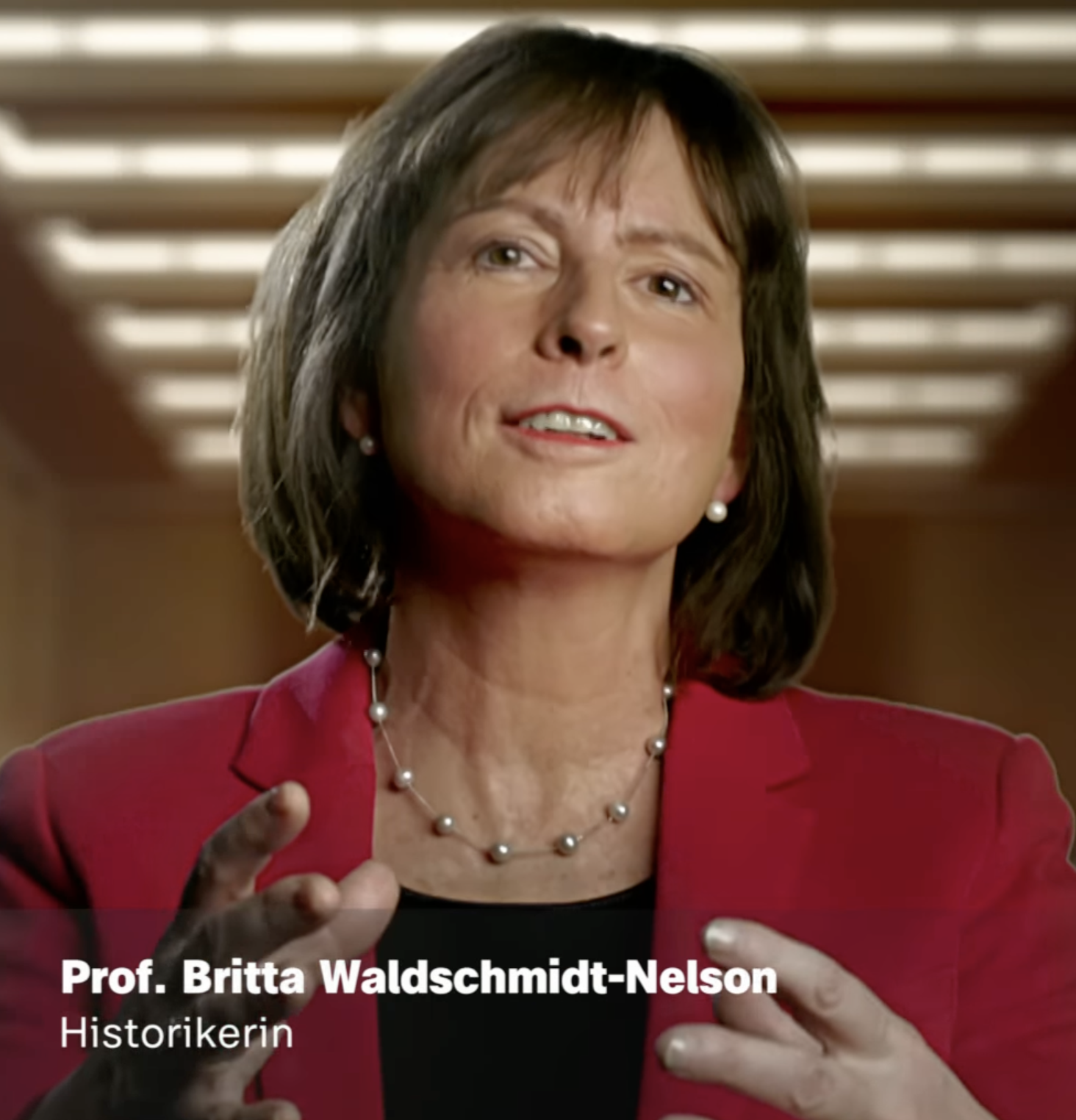
Britta Waldschmidt-Nelson

Britta Waldschmidt-Nelson (born 9 April 1965 in Dortmund) is the professor of transatlantic history and culture at the University of Augsburg, Germany, and has been since October 2016. Prior to this, Britta Waldschmidt-Nelson was deputy director at the German Historical Institute, Washington, D.C., where her research interests included African American studies, transatlantic relations, and gender and American religious history (2011–2016). Born on 9 April 1965, Waldschmidt-Nelson received her PhD summa cum laude from LMU Munich in American history and culture in 1997, and worked there as a lecturer, assistant professor, and associate professor in the same field, before becoming a professor of American history and culture in 2013.

Britta Waldschmidt-Nelson has published widely about American History, often exploring links between twentieth century history in the United States and Germany. Her inaugural lecture at the University of Augsburg addressed the topic "From swastikas to Jim Crow" (“Vom Hakenkreuz zu Jim Crow”).

== Bibliography ==
=== Books ===
- von der Goltz & Waldschmidt-Nelson (2017). Inventing the Silent Majority in Western Europe and the United States: Conservatism in the 1960s and 1970s. Cambridge University Press.
- Waldschmidt-Nelson (2015). Malcolm X: Eine Biographie. Munich: Beck Verlag.
- Kosc, Juncker, Monteith, Waldschmidt-Nelson (eds.) (2013), The Transatlantic Sixties: Europe and the United States in the Counterculture Decade. Transcript Verlag. ISBN 978-3-8376-2216-4
- Waldschmidt-Nelson (2012) Dreams and Nightmares: Martin Luther King, Malcolm X, and the Struggle for Black Equality in America. Gainesville: University Press of Florida, 2012.
- Waldschmidt-Nelson (2009) Christian Science im Lande Luthers: Die Entwicklung einer amerikanischen Religions-gemeinschaft in Deutschland von der Kaiserzeit bis heute. Stuttgart: Steiner. ISBN 978-3-515-09380-4.
- Waldschmidt-Nelson, Britta (2007), Martin Luther King - Malcolm X: Gegenspieler (5 ed.), Fischer Taschenbuch Verlag, ISBN 978-3-596-14662-8
- Dreams and Nightmares: Martin Luther King, Malcolm X, and the Struggle for Black Equality in America. Gainesville: University Press of Florida, 2012 (rezensiert in Southern Studies: An Interdisciplinary Journal of the South, Vol. 19, Nr. 2, Herbst/Winter 2012, 26, Journal of African American History, Vol. 98, Nr. 4, Herbst 2013, 648, Journal of Southern History, Vol. 79, Nr. 1, Februar 2013, 232 und Journal of American History, Vol. 100, Nr. 1, Juni 2013, 273.
- Waldschmidt-Nelson, Britta (2006), In God we trust: the unique history and current role of religion in America, Akad. für Lehrerfortbildung und Personalführung
- Britta Waldschmidt-Nelson (2006), Europe and America: cultures in translation, Winter, ISBN 978-3-8253-5258-5
- Waldschmidt-Nelson, Britta (1998). From protest to politics : schwarze Frauen in der Bürgerrechtsbewegung und im Kongreß der Vereinigten Staaten. Frankfurt am Main: Campus Verlag.

=== Articles ===
- Chatelain, Marcia; Waldschmidt-Nelson, Britta (2015). "Introduction. Untold stories : the March on Washington - new perspectives and transatlantic legacies" (PDF). Bulletin of the German Historical Institute (Washington DC). Supplement 11: 5–14. Archived from the original (PDF) on 2015-09-14.
- Europe and America: Cultures in Translation. Hg. Britta Waldschmidt-Nelson, Markus Hünemörder und Meike Zwingenberger. Heidelberg: Winter, 2006.
- Martin Luther King: Leben, Werk und Vermächtnis. Hg. Michael Haspel und Britta Waldschmidt-Nelson. Weimar: Wartburg, 2008.
- The Transatlantic Sixties: Europe and the United States in the Counterculture Decade. Hg. Clara Juncker, Gregorz Kosc, Sharon Monteith und Britta Waldschmidt-Nelson. Bielefeld: transcript Verlag, 2013 (rezensiert in Journal of Contemporary European Studies. Vol. 22, Nr. 3, 2014, 359–360).
- Staging a Dream: Untold Stories and Transatlantic Legacies of the March on Washington. Hg. Britta Waldschmidt-Nelson, Marcia Chatelain und Sharon Monteith, GHI Bulletin-Sonderband Nr. 11 (im Druck).
- Inventing the „Silent Majority“: Conservative Mobilization in Western Europe and the United States in the 1960s and 1970s. Hg. Anna von der Goltz und Britta Waldschmidt-Nelson (im Begutachtungsprozess der Cambridge University Press.
