= Stephen Baron (friar) =

English friar

Stephen Baron (died 1520?) was an English Franciscan friar of the Strict Observance.

== Life ==
Baron was educated at the University of Cambridge, where he acquired fame as a preacher. He became confessor to King Henry VIII, and provincial of his order in England. He died soon after 1520.

== Works ==
His works are :

- ‘Sermones Declamati corā alma vniuersitate Cātibrigiēsi per venerandum patrem fratrem Stephanum baronē fratrum minorū de obseruātia nūcupatorū regni Anglie prouincialē vicariū ac confessorē regiū Impressi lōdonijs per wynandū de worde (ī the fletestrete) ad signum solis moram trahētem,’ n. d. It is printed in double columns, black letter.
- ‘Incipit tractatulus eiusdem venerādi patris De regimine principū ad serenissimum regē anglie henricū octauum. Impressus lōdonijs,’ &c. as in the preceding work, to which it was presumably intended to be an appendix. It is dedicated to King Henry VIII.
