= Eugenia Yuan =

American actress

- Chinese: 原麗淇 (Yuan Lai-Kai)
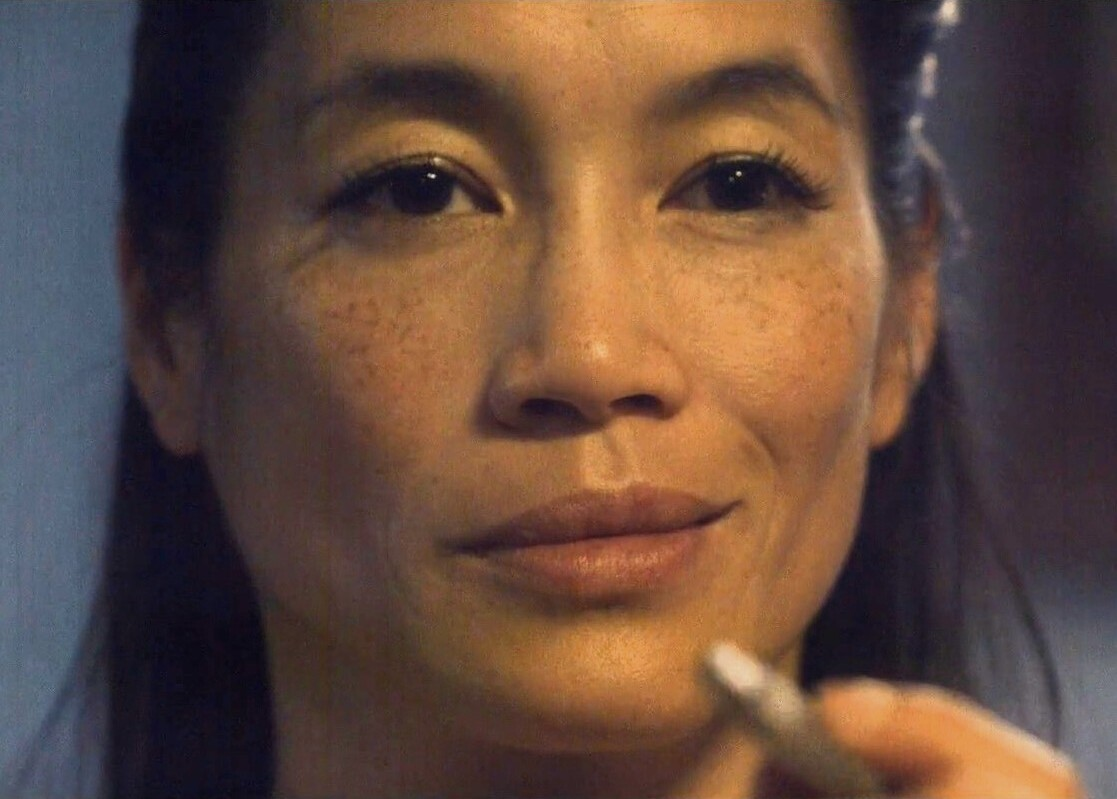
- Yuan in She Has a Name, 2016
- Born: October 26, 1976 (age 49); Inglewood, California, U.S.
- Other names: Lai-Kai Yuan, Lai-Kei Yuan, Eugenia Lai-Kai Yuan
- Occupation: Actress
- Years active: 1982; 1995; 2000–present
- Known for: Member of U.S. National Rhythmic Gymnastics team.
- Mother: Cheng Pei-pei

Eugenia Yuan (born October 26, 1976) is an American actress and former rhythmic gymnast who has won a Hong Kong Film Award.

== Early life ==
Yuan was born in Inglewood, California. Her mother is Cheng Pei-pei, an actress who is known for being a Shaw Brothers Studio alumnus and the role of Jade Fox in Crouching Tiger, Hidden Dragon. Yuan grew up in San Marino, California.

== Career ==
=== Gymnastics ===
Yuan began her career as a rhythmic gymnast for the U.S. Olympic Team and was ranked #4 in the world. Yuan was a member of the U.S. National Rhythmic Gymnastics team for about seven years.

=== Entertainment ===
Yuan's first screen role was acting alongside her mother in Flying Dragon, Leaping Tiger (2002), a martial arts movie. Yuan co-starred in the 2002 drama Charlotte Sometimes which won the best first feature award at the Independent Spirit Awards.

Yuan returned to Hong Kong to star in one segment of Three where she was named "Best Newcomer" in the Hong Kong Film Awards. Hollywood director Doug Liman chose her for the title role of the mockumentary Mail Order Wife, for which she was named as a "Rising Star/Screen Acting Discovery" at the Hamptons International Film Festival.

She was nominated at Hong Kong's Golden Horse Awards for her starring role in 2004's The Eye 2 and had roles in the John Dahl film The Great Raid and the Oscar-winning Memoirs of a Geisha. The jewelry retailer Me & Ro created a special edition hair ornament inspired by Yuan's character in the movie.

Yuan continues to travel back and forth between Los Angeles, New York City and Hong Kong to take studio, Chinese-language and American independent roles alike including the 2007 Gotham Awards winning film Choking Man. She also co-stars with Tony Leung Ka Fai in the Kenneth Bi film, The Drummer, and Erica Leerhsen in Slaughter. Most recently she has appeared in the Australian television drama Secret City.

== Filmography ==
Year	Title	Role	Notes/Ref.
2019–20	Hawaii Five-0	Daiyu Mei	
2019	Into the Badlands	Kannin	
2017	She Has a Name	Mamma	
2016	Crouching Tiger, Hidden Dragon: Sword of Destiny	Blind Enchantress	
2016	Secret City	Weng	TV series - 12 episodes
2015	The Man with the Iron Fists 2	Ah Ni	
2015	Jasmine		
2014	Revenge of the Green Dragons	Snakehead Mama	
2013	Pupil (Short)		
2013	#1 Serial Killer		
2012	What About Us? (Short)		
2012	Strangers (2012 film) | Strangers		
2011	My Life in a Box		
2011	Shanghai Hotel		
2011	I Don't Know How She Does It	Jack's Receptionist	
2010	Fog		
2007	The Drummer	Kuan's wife	
2006	Choking Man	Amy	
2006	Locked (1992)		
2005	Memoirs of a Geisha	Korin	
2005	The Great Raid	Cora	
2004	Mail Order Wife	Lichi	
2004	My Name Is Modesty: A Modesty Blaise Adventure	Irina	
2004	The Eye 2	Yuen Chi-kei	
2002	3 Extremes II	Hal'er, Uu's wife	
2002	Charlotte Sometimes	Lori	
2002	Flying Dragon, Leaping Tiger	Xiao Xia	
1982	Dragon Strike	Voice	
