= Alberta Playwrights Network =

- Formation: 1985
- Type: Professional association
- Purpose: Playwriting
- Location: Alberta
- Official language: English
- President: Sharon Pollock
- Affiliations: Scripts At Work
- Website: http://www.albertaplaywrights.com/

The Alberta Playwrights Network (APN) is a professional association that was founded in 1985 to develop and support playwrights. It hosts a competition called the New Play Development Program. Gordon Pengilly is a dramaturge for the Alberta Playwrights Network, as is Gisèle Villeneuve. Sharon Pollock was elected president of the Alberta Playwrights Network in 1998. Sandra Dempsey had previously been the president. The Alberta Playwrights Network supported Katherine Koller in writing such plays as The Seed Savers. The association produces a newsletter called Rave Review. The Alberta Playwrights Network has also engaged in playwright exchanges with other associations, including the Saskatchewan Playwrights Centre and the Playwrights Theatre Centre. The Alberta Playwrights Network also presented an annual award with Scripts At Work called the Scripts At Work/Alberta Playwrights Network Award.

== See also ==
- List of Canadian playwrights
- List of writers from Alberta
