= Uptown (newspaper) =

Alternative weekly in Manitoba, Canada

- Type: Alternative weekly
- Format: Broadsheet
- Owner: FP Newspapers
- Founded: 1985/1987
- Language: English
- City: Winnipeg
- Sister newspapers: Winnipeg Free Press
- Website: Official website at the Wayback Machine (archive index)

Uptown (originally the Uptown Gazette) was an alternative weekly arts and entertainment newspaper in Winnipeg, Manitoba, Canada. Like most alternative weekly newspapers in Canada, Uptown includes articles regarding the arts and entertainment, CD reviews, concert reviews, book reviews and extensive current events listings. However, unlike others in its genre (such as Now Magazine, Voir and the Georgia Straight), Uptown generally does not provide any substantial coverage of current issues events apart from occasional columns concerning local news.

The Uptown Gazette originated as an independent newspaper, and its existence has at times been precarious. Briefly in the 1990s, it published a second newspaper, Uptown 2. During the late 1990s Uptown faced a challenge from several competing alternative weeklies, most notably from Perimeter magazine, but it emerged as the sole survivor. Uptown was purchased in 2005 by FP Newspapers, owners of the Winnipeg Free Press. Little about Uptown has changed since the acquisition, except for a relocation from its previous Exchange District offices to the suburban St. James area. In 2012 Uptown was transformed into a weekly supplement to the Winnipeg Free Press.

== See also ==
- List of newspapers in Canada
