= Steve Barron =

Irish-British filmmaker and music video director (born 1956)

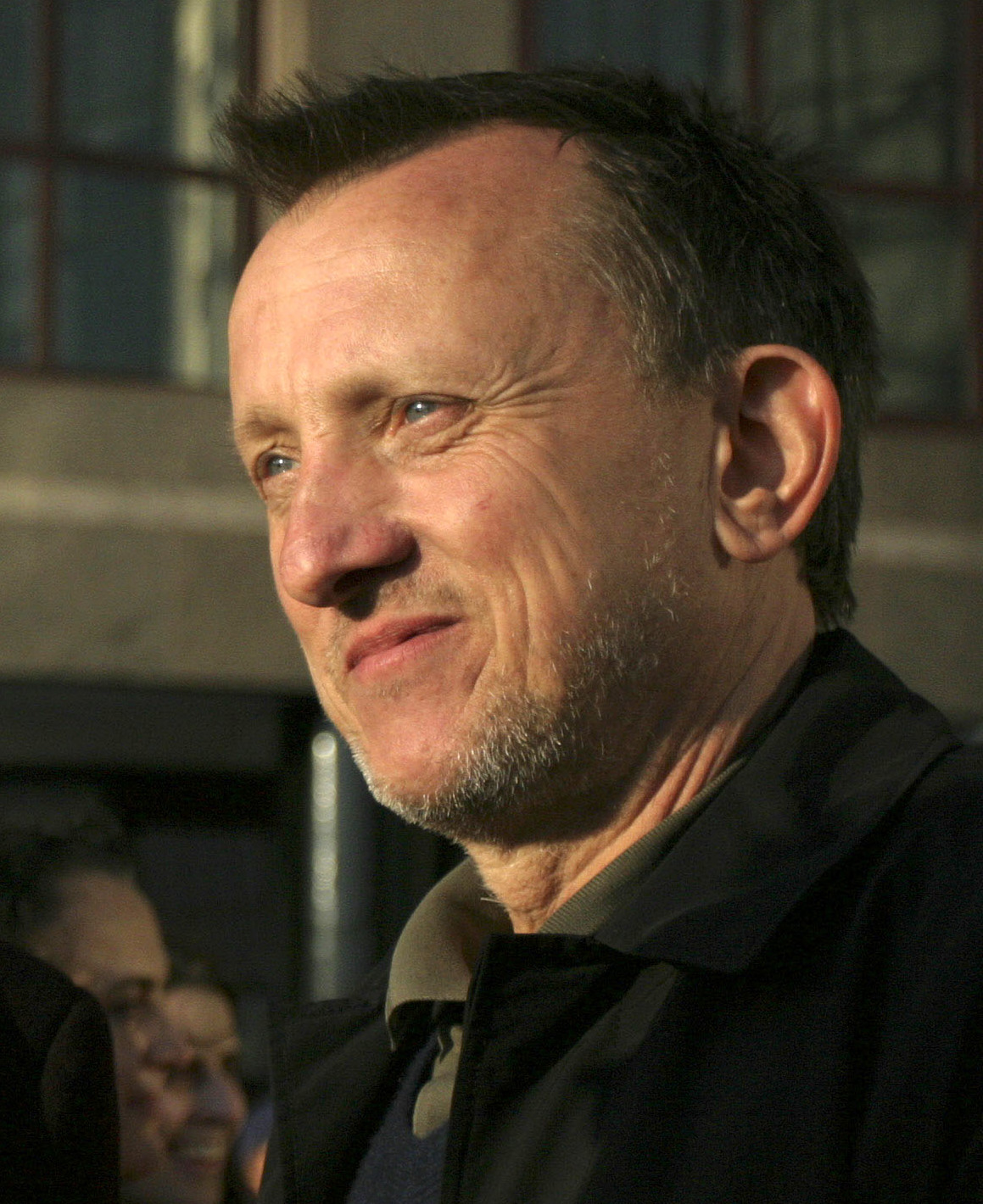
- Barron in July 2009
- Born: Steven Barron; 4 May 1956 (age 70); Dublin, Ireland
- Occupations: Filmmaker; music video director
- Years active: 1976–present

Steven Barron (born 4 May 1956) is an Irish-British filmmaker and music video director. Among the music videos he has directed are "Billie Jean" by Michael Jackson, "Burnin Up" by Madonna, "Summer of '69" and "Run to You" by Bryan Adams, "Money for Nothing" by Dire Straits, "Electric Avenue" and "I Don't Wanna Dance" by Eddy Grant, "Going Underground" by The Jam, "Don't You Want Me" by The Human League, "Baby Jane" by Rod Stewart, "Pale Shelter" by Tears for Fears, "Africa" by Toto, and "Take On Me" by A-ha. The videos for "Take On Me", "Africa", and "Billie Jean" have each garnered over 1 billion views on YouTube. Barron also directed several films, including Teenage Mutant Ninja Turtles (1990), Coneheads (1993), and The Adventures of Pinocchio (1996).

== Early life ==
Barron was born in Dublin on 4 May 1956, the son of filmmaker Zelda Barron (née Solomons, 1929–2006) and actor Ron Barron. His mother was born in Manchester to an English mother and Russian father. His parents married in 1953 but the marriage was later dissolved. He has an older sister named Siobhan. He was raised in London and attended St Marylebone Grammar School.

== Career ==
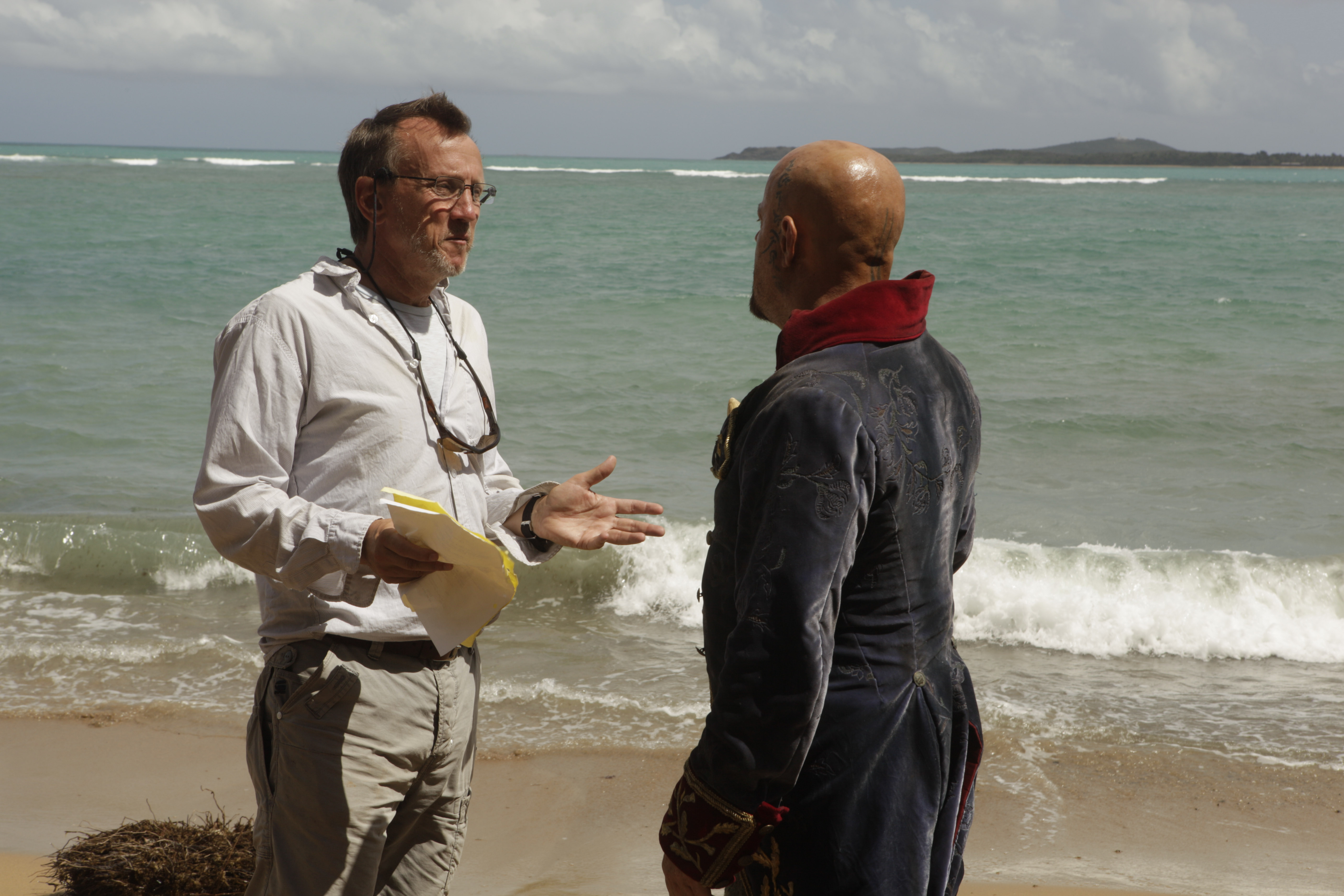
Barron on the set of the 2012 TV series Treasure Island

=== Camera Assistant ===
Steve Barron began his film career as a camera assistant on some of the biggest motion pictures made in Europe of the 1970s. These included Richard Attenborough’s epic A Bridge Too Far, Ridley Scott’s “The Duellists” and Richard Donner’s blockbuster Superman.

=== Music videos ===
With an eye on the evolving music industry of the late 1970s, Barron then co-founded a production company called Steploes to produce two concert films, one of which featured the influential rock band The Jam. Barron would then direct several music videos for them, including the UK number one hit "Going Underground”. The company eventually changed its name to Limelight and by 1983 it was the biggest music video production company in the world.

Drawing on his camera assistant experience, Barron decided to have the music video for The Human League’s "Don't You Want Me" photographed on the more cinematic 35mm film as opposed to 16mm and video. The elevated technical quality and his cinematic visuals earned heavy rotation on the new television channel, MTV. It also caught the attention of musical superstar Michael Jackson, for whom Barron then conceived and directed the award-winning and highly influential “Billie Jean” - the first single of the world’s best-selling album, Thriller.

Many of these music videos combined his passion for animation and the latest electronic video post production technology. They included the groundbreaking computer animated "Money for Nothing" for Dire Straits, which would win Best Video at the 1986 MTV Awards. Barron was also awarded best director for his live action and animated music video for "Take On Me" by A-ha.

=== Feature Film Debut ===
==== Electric Dreams ====
In 1984, Barron’s debut feature film was the music-led romantic comedy Electric Dreams starring Virginia Madsen, released worldwide by Virgin and MGM. It made innovative use of the unique grammar and imagery that he helped pioneer for MTV, aided by a soundtrack featuring Culture Club, Giorgio Moroder and Jeff Lynne. Critics such as Roger Ebert and Gene Siskel heaped praise on Barron's direction of the movie.

==== The Storyteller ====
In 1987, Barron joined forces with Muppet creator Jim Henson, screenwriter Anthony Minghella and producer Duncan Kenworthy, making his first foray into network television as a lead director. The show ‘Jim Henson’s The Storyteller’, starred John Hurt and a host of characters created using innovative, state of the art animatronic technology from Jim Henson's Creature Shop. ‘The Storyteller’ won an Emmy for the pilot episode 'Hans My Hedgehog' for NBC. His second episode 'Fearnot' broadcast in 1987, while a third, 'Sapsorrow', broadcast in 1988. The Washington Post said of 'Fearnot' - "This fantasy turns the television screen into Alice's looking glass, Snow White's magic mirror and The Thief of Baghdad's all-seeing eye. It is so seductively imaginative that you can almost feel it pulling you into a bottomless tube”.

=== Feature Films ===
In 1990, Barron's second movie became the first independent feature to break the 100 million-dollar theatrical barrier in the U.S. Teenage Mutant Ninja Turtles grossed over $200 million dollars worldwide. The film married the innovative visuals of MTV with state of the art, computerised Jim Henson animatronics and puppetry.

A Grammy nomination followed for Dire Straits' 'Calling Elvis' and the Billboard Best Director award for Natalie Cole's 'Unforgettable' duet with her father Nat King Cole.

In the mid-nineties Barron directed the Dan Aykroyd and Jane Curtin starring feature Coneheads for Paramount. He was Executive Producer on the Sylvester Stallone and Sharon Stone picture The Specialist, and the highly successful While You Were Sleeping starring Sandra Bullock and Bill Pullman. He was also Executive Producer on ReBoot, the first fully computer animated network series.

In 1996, Barron directed The Adventures of Pinocchio, starring Oscar winner Martin Landau as well as the title character played by Jonathan Taylor Thomas, with sophisticated puppetry by Jim Henson’s Creature Shop. The Washington Post wrote of the film, "The Adventures of Pinocchio evokes the look and language of traditional European picture book tales, and does so with so much charm that it offers a fresh new delight, not just a pale live-action imitation, of the Disney animated classic."

In autumn of 1998, Barron directed Merlin, a lavish $30 million television two-part series produced by Hallmark for NBC in America. Merlin attracted a stellar cast including Sam Neill, Helena Bonham-Carter, Miranda Richardson, Isabella Rossellini, Martin Short, James Earl Jones, Sir John Gielgud and Rutger Hauer. It was filmed at Pinewood Studios and featured extensive digital imagery and post production created by Framestore, whom Barron had been involved with during his music video days. 'Merlin' was nominated for 15 Emmy's, 4 Golden Globes and a DGA nod for outstanding Directing.

In 1999, Barron completed the two-part mini-series Arabian Nights, this time for the ABC network in America. Photographed on location in Turkey and Morocco, its stars include Alan Bates, Jason Scott Lee, John Leguizamo, Dougray Scott and Rufus Sewell. The show aired on ABC TV in the USA and BBC1 in the UK simultaneously, earning 5 more Emmy and a US National Television Critics nomination. Praising its presentation, Variety reviewer Michael Speier remarked: "A well–researched project that takes advantage of an accomplished cast, two-parter gets a big nod in the class department.”

In October 2000 the Universal movie Rat had its theatrical premiere in Dublin. Starring Imelda Staunton, Pete Postlethwaite and Kerry Condon, this dark comedy, co-produced and directed by Barron, is the bizarre story of a Dublin man who comes home from the pub one day 'not feeling very well' and turns into a rat. It featured more character work from Jim Henson’s Creature Shop.

Barron’s next comedy was Mike Bassett: England Manager a spoof documentary feature film starring Ricky Tomlinson as the national soccer coach. It feature cameos from soccer playing legends such as Pelé and Ronaldo. The film had a wide UK theatrical release in November 2001, through the government funded Film Council and Entertainment distributors, taking $6m and charting at number three in its first four weeks.

Following this was a $24m American Lakota Indigenous mini-series epic for ABC and Hallmark. Dreamkeeper is the first big scale attempt to bring to life the myth's and legends of the American Lakota Indigenous people. Tribes all across the United States were consulted and ninety-five speaking roles were all cast with Lakota Indigenous people. The production won Barron a Gold for Directorial Achievement at the Chicago International TV Festival and an Emmy Award for best visual effects.

In 2005 Barron wrote and directed the New York based independent feature film Choking Man starring Mandy Patinkin and Aaron Paul. The contemporary feature follows the fortunes of an acutely shy Ecuadorian dishwasher. Set in an old traditional diner in Jamaica, Queens, the movie's backdrop is the largest, most diverse immigrant population in North America. The film had a two week run at the Museum of Moving Art in New York and three weeks at London's British Film Institute. Ronnie Scheib from Variety praised the skill in Barron’s direction: “Barron executes all the hard stuff remarkably well: vivid ensemble thesping, evocative locales and even unforced Catholic symbolism.” Oscar-winning director Steven Soderbergh described Choking Man as "everything an independent film should be."

=== Later Career ===
Barron was presented with an 'Outstanding Achievement in Music Videos' award at the Hammersmith Palais in London. 2007 also brought a Gotham Award for his first original screenplay Choking Man. Through these years Barron Exec-Produced two feature documentaries for 'Peace One Day' and 'The Day After Peace' with Jude Law and Angelina Jolie, which premiered at the Edinburgh Film Festival and Cannes respectively. The film charts Jeremy Gilley's incredible journey to create a day of peace in the world calendar.

In 2009, Barron directed the Sci-Fi internet drama pilot ‘Slingers’, starring Sean Pertwee, with visual effects once again by Framestore.

2011 saw Barron direct the miniseries Treasure Island, for Sky and SyFy, starring Eddie Izzard, Elijah Wood and Donald Sutherland. Filmed in Dublin and Puerto Rico, Barron achieved two more Emmy nominations.

Premiering in 2013, Barron directed the Artificial Intelligence thriller mini-series for Sonar Entertainment - 'Delete'. It would win two Leo Awards, and starred Seth Green, Theresa Russell and Gil Bellows.

Between 2014 to 2019, Barron was lead director of season 1 and 2 of the highly rated ITV comedy drama, The Durrells, and directed the final three closing episodes of the forth and final season. Meredith Blake for the LA Times had this to say of the show, which received a BAFTA nomination for Best Dramatic Series: “Not surprisingly, the series is gorgeous to look at, with special attention paid to the Corfiot flora and fauna. As usual in these British period pieces, the cast is uniformly excellent. The Durrell children are vividly realized oddballs, each irritating and endearing in nearly equal measure.”

In 2019, Barron returned to feature films, directing Oscar winner Louis Gossett Jr. Oscar nominee Tom Berenger and Beau Bridges in the irreverent, superhero themed comedy, “Supervized”.

In 2021, Barron was the lead director of the David Tennant starring £40M international co-production of Around the World in 80 Days, with Romania and South Africa standing in for multiple world-wide locations. Produced by Slim Film + TV during the height of the COVID pandemic, critic Sheena Scott for Forbes stated “At a time when travel is becoming increasingly difficult, if not impossible, Around the World in 80 Days is a great period series to escape to.”

From 2022, Barron moved successfully into the genre of murder mystery series, collaborating with Monumental Television:

After directing the final third of Murder in Provence for Britbox and ITV, Barron executive produced and directed episodes of Mrs Sidhu Investigates, starring Meera Syal, for Acorn TV.

The murder mystery adventures with Monumental Television continued in 2024, when Barron became director and executive producer on three seasons of The Marlow Murder Club. Co-produced by ITV Studios and PBS Masterpiece, the show stars multi-Laurence Olivier Award nominee Samantha Bond, Cara Horgan and Jo Martin. Barron was nominated for a Royal Television Society East Programme Award for Scripted Director.

=== Sustainable Farming ===
In addition to directing television and film, Barron is also greatly committed to sustainable living, owning and operating the 53 acre Margent Farm in Cambridge, UK. The site grows and harvests hemp for organic, bio-composite building materials.

=== Autobiography ===
In November 2014, Barron published his autobiography, Egg n Chips & Billie Jean: A Trip Through the Eighties.

== Filmography ==
=== Film ===
Year	Title	Director	Producer	Writer
1984	Electric Dreams	Yes		
1990	Teenage Mutant Ninja Turtles	Yes		
1993	Coneheads	Yes		
1996	The Adventures of Pinocchio	Yes		Yes
2000	Rat	Yes	Yes	
2001	Mike Bassett: England Manager	Yes	Yes	
2006	Choking Man	Yes	Yes	Yes
2008	The Day After Peace		Co-producer	
2016	Brahman Naman		Yes	
2019	Supervized	Yes	Yes	

Cameraman

- Trauma (1976)
- The Duellists (1977)
- A Bridge Too Far (1977)
- Superman (1978) (Uncredited)

Executive producer

- The Specialist (1994)
- While You Were Sleeping (1995)
- Peace One Day (2004) (Documentary)

=== Television ===
Year	Title	Director	Executive Producer	Notes
1987–1988	The Storyteller	Yes		Episodes: "Hans My Hedgehog", "Fearnot", and "Sapsorrow"
1994–2001	ReBoot		Yes	
1998	Merlin	Yes		Miniseries
2000	Arabian Nights	Yes		Miniseries
2003	Dreamkeeper	Yes		TV movie
2005	Mike Bassett: Manager		Yes	
2010	The Road Ahead	Yes		TV movie
2012	Treasure Island	Yes		Miniseries
2013	Delete	Yes	Yes	Miniseries
2016–2017	The Durrells in Corfu	Yes		
2021	Around the World in 80 Days	Yes	Yes	TV Series
2022	Murder in Provence	Yes		TV Series
2023	Mrs Sidhu Investigates	Yes	Yes	TV Series
2024-2027	The Marlow Murder Club	Yes	Yes	TV Series

=== Music videos ===
- A-ha – "Take On Me" (1985), "The Sun Always Shines on T.V." (1985), "Hunting High and Low" (1986), "Cry Wolf" (1986), "Manhattan Skyline" (1987), "The Living Daylights" (1987), "Crying in the Rain" (1990), "Butterfly, Butterfly" (2010)
- Adam and the Ants – "Antmusic" (1980)
- Bryan Adams – "Cuts Like a Knife" (1983), "This Time" (1983), "Run to You" (1984), "Heaven" (1985), "Summer of '69" (1985)
- Culture Club – "God Thank You Woman" (1986)
- David Bowie – "As the World Falls Down" (1986) "Underground" (1986)
- Def Leppard – "Let's Get Rocked" (1992)
- Dire Straits – "Money for Nothing" (1985), "Heavy Fuel" (1991)
- Dolly Parton – "Potential New Boyfriend" (1983)
- Eddy Grant – "Electric Avenue" (1982), "I Don't Wanna Dance" (1982), "Living on the Front Line" (1983)
- Fleetwood Mac – "Hold Me" (1982)
- Fun Boy Three – "It Ain't What You Do...." (1982)
- Heaven 17 – "Penthouse and Pavement" (1981), "Let Me Go" (1982), "Temptation" (1983)
- The Human League – "Don't You Want Me" (1981), "Love Action" (1981), "(Keep Feeling) Fascination" (1983)
- The Jam – "Strangetown" (1978), "When You're Young" (1979), "Going Underground" (1979), "Dreams of Children" (1979)
- Joan Armatrading – "Drop the Pilot" (1983), "Kind Words (And a Real Good Heart)" (1986)
- Joe Jackson – "Steppin' Out" (1982), "Real Men" (1982), "Breaking Us in Two" (1982)
- Level 42 – "Heaven in My Hands" (1988)
- Madonna – "Burning Up" (1983)
- Michael Jackson – "Billie Jean" (1983)
- Natalie Cole & Nat King Cole – "Unforgettable" (1991)
- Orchestral Manoeuvres in the Dark – "Maid of Orleans" (1982)
- Paul McCartney – "Pretty Little Head" (1986)
- Rod Stewart – "Baby Jane" (1983)
- Secret Affair – "Time for Action" (1979), "My World" (1980), "Sound of Confusion" (1980)
- Sheena Easton – "For Your Eyes Only" (1981), "Telefone (Long Distance Love Affair)" (1983)
- Simple Minds – "Promised You a Miracle" (1982)
- Skids – "Iona" (1981)
- Steve Hackett - "Cell 151" (1983)
- Styx – "Haven't We Been Here Before" (1983)
- Supertramp – "Cannonball" (1985), "Better Days" (1986)
- Tears for Fears – "Pale Shelter" (1983)
- Toto – "Africa" (1982), "Rosanna" (1982), "Stranger in Town" (1984)
- ZZ Top – "Rough Boy" (1986), "Sleeping Bag" (1986)
