= Andrew Kooman =

Canadian writer

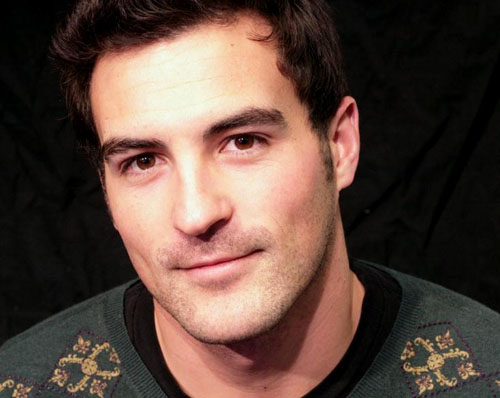
- Born: Red Deer, Alberta, Canada
- Education: University of Calgary
- Writing career
- Period: 2009–present
- Genres: Historical fiction Legal thriller Tragedy; Young adult fiction
- Notable work: She Has a Name
- Notable awards: Scripts at Work/Alberta Playwrights Network Award

Andrew Kooman is an author and playwright from Red Deer, Alberta, Canada.

== Personal life ==
Andrew Kooman is from Red Deer, Alberta, and graduated from the Bachelor of Arts collaborative degree program between Red Deer College and the University of Calgary in 2003. He also studied English and creative writing at a university in Edmonton, and graduated from the Multimedia Web Developer program at the University of Calgary in 2008. As of June 2012, he was working in public relations at Red Deer College. Andrew now lives with his wife and son in London, Ontario.

== Activism ==
Andrew Kooman first became aware of the issue of human trafficking while he was working for the Christian nonprofit organization Youth with a Mission (YWAM) in southeast Malaysia. Thereby, he met child victims of human trafficking, but Kooman later came to realize that human trafficking is an issue in Canada as well. The Royal Canadian Mounted Police (RCMP) estimate that between 600 and 800 people are trafficked into Canada every year.

Kooman has spoken about the cases in which people have been trafficked into Calgary and Edmonton to work in the sex industry, and has posited that sex workers have likely been trafficked into his hometown of Red Deer as well since it is also located along Alberta Highway 2. Kooman continued to work in Malaysia with YWAM for two years, towards the end of which time he visited Singapore. There, he attended an international conference on human trafficking, learning details on the issue that shocked him. The conference focused on the military use of children and the prostitution of children. One of the facts that stuck with Kooman was that there are children aged five and under who are forcibly prostituted daily, and that many of these children end up spending their entire lives as human trafficking victims.

Kooman is the director of Raise Their Voice, a creative, justice-driven, nonprofit organisation in Red Deer. The other four members of the organization are his family members. With the help of two brothers Matthew and Daniel, Kooman established Unveil Studios.

== Writing career ==
Andrew Kooman is an author and playwright. All of Kooman's writings focus on justice and many of the issues he writes about are gender-based. Kooman's first literary reaction to human trafficking was to write some short stories. Eventually, he also started writing the play that became She Has a Name to bring attention to the issue of human trafficking, specifically in its connections to sexual exploitation. In 2009, the script of She Has a Name was given the Scripts at Work/Alberta Playwrights Network Award. By February 2012, Kooman was working on a screenplay version of She Has a Name to expose it to a larger audience.

Some Americans expressed an interest in staging She Has a Name in the United States. After starting to write this play, Kooman read about the Ranong human-trafficking incident in a Canadian newspaper and also heard about it through a friend of his who was working at an aftercare centre in Bangkok, Thailand to restore the dignity of former sex workers. Knowing that many of the impoverished girls who are smuggled in this manner become enslaved in brothels as child prostitutes, Kooman used the incident in the backstory of the play.

There was a tour of She Has a Name in 2012, and the final performances were held in Red Deer. Kooman was glad to have the tour conclude in his hometown because the people of Central Alberta were very supportive of the play. During the tour, Kooman was awarded the Outstanding Alumnus Provincial Award Celebrating Excellence (PACE) by the Alberta Association of Colleges & Technical Institutes (AACTI) and the Alberta Ministry of Enterprise. In conjunction with this award, a $5000 scholarship was set up in Kooman's name, which he chose to have awarded to students who evince creativity, leadership, and a commitment to those who are in need. The PACE Award ceremony is biennial, and took place on June 13 in Edmonton at the AACTI Board of Governors Conference.

Before writing She Has a Name, Kooman had written other pieces of literature that had been published, such as the young adult novel Ten Silver Coins: The Drylings of Acchora, but this was his first full-length play. He had, however, been writing shorter plays since 2007, and has written other full-length plays since She Has a Name, including one about Richard Wurmbrand, a Romanian Christian who was a political prisoner of the Soviet Union in the 1950s, and another about the Nazi occupation of the Netherlands; these plays are called We Are The Body and Delft Blue respectively.
