= Jackie Jones =

British politician

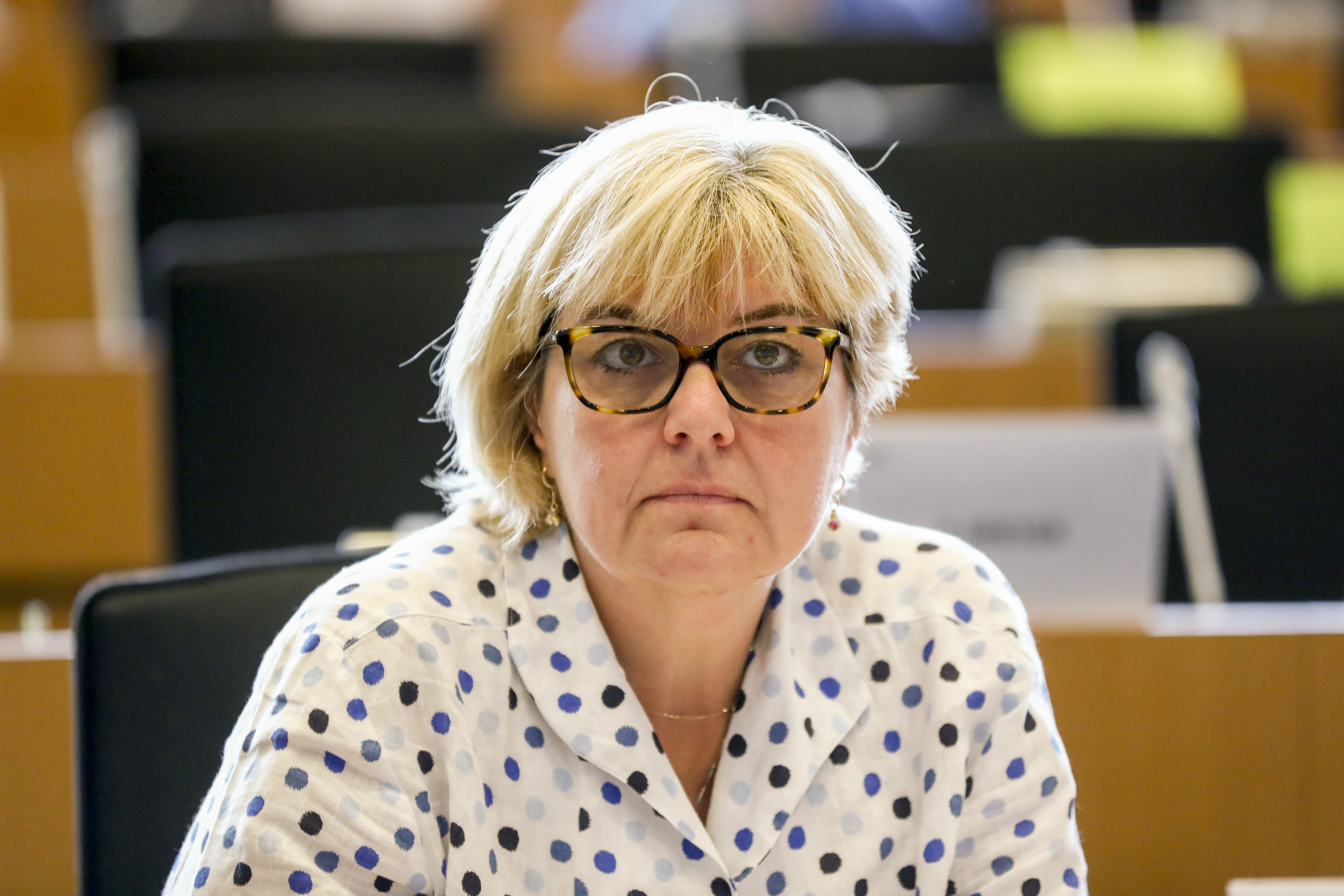
- Jones in 2019

Member of the European Parliament for Wales
- In office 2 July 2019 – 31 January 2020
- Preceded by: Derek Vaughan
- Succeeded by: Constituency abolished

Personal details
- Born: 10 February 1966 (age 60) UK
- Party: Labour Party
- Profession: Politician, barrister, academic
- Website: https://www.jackiejones.wales/

Jacqueline Margarete Jones (born 10 February 1966) is a Welsh politician, barrister, and academic. She served as the Labour Party Member of the European Parliament (MEP) for Wales from 2019 to 2020. She taught law at Cardiff Law School, Cardiff University, and then at Bristol Law School, University of the West of England, where she was Professor of Feminist Legal Studies.

== Background ==
In 2019 it was reported that Jackie had lived in Cardiff and Pembrokeshire since 1985.

== Academic career ==
Jones has been researching and teaching law for over 20 years, first at Cardiff Law School, then at Bristol Law School, UWE. Her main teaching and research interests lie in the areas of gender, migration, asylum process, human trafficking, violence against women, all within a human rights perspective.

Jones was previously the Chair of the Wales Assembly of Women and President of the European Women Lawyers Association, and worked with various equalities organisations, including Welsh Women's Aid and the National Alliance of Women's Organisations.

== Political career ==
Jones was the Labour MEP for Wales in the European Parliament from July 2019 to January 2020, when the UK withdrew from the European Union. Within the European Parliament, Jones was a member of the Legal Affairs Committee, the Women's Rights and Gender Equality Committee, and a substitute member of the Transport and Tourism Committee, as well as first Vice-Chair of the Delegation for relations with the United States. Jones also founded the Wales-EU Parliamentary Friendship Group which focused on strengthening Welsh-EU relations and providing a platform for Welsh citizens' rights and interests at the European level post-Brexit.

Jones stood for the Labour Party in Preseli Pembrokeshire at the 2021 Senedd election. She came second with 35% of the vote. At the 2022 UK local elections she was elected to represent the Whitchurch & Tongwynlais ward on Cardiff Council.

From 2021 until late 2023, Jones was the chair of Wales for Europe.

In the 2024 general election, Jones contested the Ceredigion Preseli constituency. She placed third, receiving 11.6% of the vote.

Jones stood as a Labour candidate for the Caerdydd Ffynnon Taf constituency for the 2026 Senedd election but was not elected.

== Selected works ==
- Schulze, Reiner; Schulte-Nolke, Hans; Jones, Jackie (2002). A Casebook on European Consumer Law. Oxford: Hart Publishing. ISBN 978-1841132273.
- Jones, Jackie; Grear, Anna; Fenton, Rachel Anne; Stevenson, Kim, eds. (2011). Gender, Sexualities and Law. London: Routledge. ISBN 978-0415574396.
- Manjoo, Rashida; Jones, Jackie, eds. (2018). The legal protection of women from violence : normative gaps in international law. London: Routledge. ISBN 978-1138737969.
- Jones, Jackie; Winterdyk, John, eds. (2018). Human Trafficking: Challenges and Opportunities the 21st Century. LAP LAMBERT Academic Publishing. ISBN 978-6139852406.
