= Arunima =

Arunima may refer to:

- Arunima Ghosh (born 1984), Indian actress
- Arunima Kumar (born 1978), Indian Kuchipudi dancer
- Arunima Lamsal, Nepalese actress
- Arunima Sharma (born 1979), Indian actress
- Arunima Sinha (born 1988), Indian mountaineer
