= 2025 Special Honours =

British list of honours

As part of the British honours system, Special Honours are issued at the Monarch's pleasure at any given time. The Special Honours refer to the awards made within royal prerogative, operational honours, political honours and other honours awarded outside the New Year Honours and Birthday Honours.

== Highness ==
- Prince Rahim, Aga Khan V – 10 February 2025

== Life peerage ==
- Amanda Spielman – Former HM Chief Inspector of Education, Children's Services and Skills; to be Baroness Spielman, of Durlston in the County of Dorset – 9 May 2025
- Dame Katherine Grainger, DBE – Chair of the British Olympic Association, former Chair of UK Sport and former Olympian. Former Chancellor of Oxford Brookes University, currently Chancellor of the University of Glasgow; to be Baroness Grainger, of Garelochhead in the County of Dunbartonshire – 20 April 2026
- Dr Simon Case, CVO – lately Cabinet Secretary and Head of the Civil Service. Former Private Secretary to HRH Prince William, Duke of Cambridge. Former Principal Private Secretary to the Prime Minister; to be Baron Case, of Fairford in the County of Gloucestershire – 17 July 2025
- Dame Sharon White, Lady Chote, DBE – former Chair of the John Lewis Partnership, former Chief Executive of the Ofcom and former Second Permanent Secretary at HM Treasury; to be Baroness White of Tufnell Park, of Tufnell Park in the London Borough of Islington – 17 July 2025
- Sir Tim Barrow, GCMG, LVO, MBE – lately National Security Adviser. Former Second Permanent Under-Secretary and Political Director at the Foreign, Commonwealth and Development Office (FCDO); to be Baron Barrow, of Penrith in the County of Cumbria – 18 July 2025
- Jason Stockwood – Appointed Minister of State for Investment; to be Baron Stockwood, of Great Grimsby and Cleethorpes in the County of Lincolnshire – 9 October 2025
- Liz Lloyd, CBE – Appointed Parliamentary Under-Secretary of State in the Department for Science, Innovation and Technology, and the Department for Business and Trade, and Baroness in Waiting (Government Whip); to be Baroness Lloyd of Effra, of Tulse Hill in the London Borough of Lambeth – 13 October 2025
- Dr Alan Whitehead, CBE – Appointed Minister of State for Energy Security and Net Zero; to be Baron Whitehead, of St Mary's in the City of Southampton – 19 November 2025
- Professor Dame Clare Gerada, DBE – former President of the Royal College of General Practitioners; to be Baroness Gerada, of Kennington in the London Borough of Lambeth – 24 November 2025
- Polly Neate, CBE – former Chief Executive of Shelter and former Chief Executive of Women's Aid to be Baroness Neate, of Hammersmith in the London Borough of Hammersmith and Fulham – 24 November 2025

== Lord Lieutenant ==
- Sarah Barron, DL – to be Lord-Lieutenant of Midlothian – 21 February 2025
- Air Commodore Alistair Monkman, CBE – to be Lord-Lieutenant of Moray – 21 February 2025
- Colonel Charles Wallace, DL – to be Lord-Lieutenant of Stirling and Falkirk – 24 February 2025
- Professor Elizabeth Barnes, CBE DL – to be Lord-Lieutenant of the County of Staffordshire – 15 April 2025
- John Jeffrey, DL JP – to be Lord-Lieutenant for Roxburgh, Ettrick and Lauderdale – 30 June 2025
- Brigadier Michael Butterwick, CBE DL – to be Lord-Lieutenant of County Durham – 3 November 2025
- Peter Daniel Oliver, OBE DL – to be Lord-Lieutenant for Merseyside – 16 December 2025
- Professor Adeeba Malik, CBE DL – to be Lord-Lieutenant of West Yorkshire – 23 December 2025

== Privy Counsellor ==
- The Honourable Sir Anthony Smellie KCMG, KC – 5 February 2025
- Ellie Reeves MP – 2 April 2025
- The Right Honourable The Baroness Chapman of Darlington – 6 May 2025
- The Honourable Lord Ericht KC – 11 June 2025
- The Honourable Lady Carmichael KC – 11 June 2025
- James Murray MP – 10 September 2025
- Emma Reynolds MP – 10 September 2025
- Anna Turley MP – 10 September 2025
- The Honourable Sir Stephen Cobb KC – 12 November 2025
- The Honourable Sir Adrian Colton KC – 10 December 2025
- The Honourable Sir Ian Dove KC – 10 December 2025
- The Honourable Dame Juliet May DBE, KC – 10 December 2025

== Most Honourable Order of the Bath ==
Ribbon bar of the Order of the Bath

=== Knight Grand Cross of the Order of the Bath (GCB) ===
Honorary

- His Excellency Sergio Mattarella, KBE – President of Italy – 8 April 2025
- His Holiness Pope Leo XIV – Sovereign of Vatican City – 23 October 2025

== Most Distinguished Order of St Michael and St George ==
Order of St Michael and St George ribbon

=== Knight Grand Cross of the Order of St Michael and St George (GCMG) ===
- His Excellency Stanley John KC – On his appointment as Governor-General of Saint Vincent and the Grenadines – 30 December 2025

=== Knight Commander of the Order of St Michael and St George (KCMG) ===
- His Excellency Archbishop Paul Richard Gallagher – Secretary for Relations with States, Holy See – 22 October 2025

Honorary

- John Forbes Kerry – Former US Special Presidential Envoy for Climate. For services to Tackling Climate Change – 17 April 2025

=== Companion of the Order of St Michael and St George (CMG) ===
- His Eminence Cardinal Michael Felix Czerny – Prefect of the Dicastery for Promoting Integral Human Development, Holy See – 22 October 2025

== Royal Victorian Order ==
Royal Victorian Order ribbon

=== Knight Grand Cross of the Royal Victorian Order (GCVO) ===
- Sir Michael John Stevens, KCVO – upon relinquishing his appointment as Keeper of the Privy Purse and Treasurer to The King – 3 June 2025
- Vice Admiral Sir Timothy James Hamilton Laurence, KCVO, CB, ADC – 21 August 2025

=== Knight Commander of the Royal Victorian Order (KCVO) ===
- Lieutenant Colonel Michael James Michael Vernon – upon relinquishing his appointment as Comptroller, Lord Chamberlain's Office – 1 July 2025
- Colonel William Toby Browne, CVO – on relinquishment of the appointment as Crown Equerry, Lord Chamberlain’s Office – 18 December 2025

=== Commander of the Royal Victorian Order (CVO) ===
- Keith Anthony Harrison, LVO – on his retirement as Director of Finance, Royal Collection Trust – 29 January 2025
- Tosanbanmi Efua Eva Omaghomi, LVO – on relinquishment of the appointment as Director of Community Engagement to The King and The Queen – 20 February 2025
- The Right Honourable The Lord Llewellyn of Steep, OBE PC – Ambassador of the United Kingdom to Italy – 10 April 2025
- Richard Robert Gledson, LVO – upon relinquishing his appointment as Resident Factor, Balmoral Estate – 17 July 2025
- Christopher Trott – Ambassador to the Holy See – 23 October 2025
- Charlette Helen Robinson, LVO – on relinquishment of the appointment as Administrator, Privy Purse and Treasurer’s Office – 19 November 2025

=== Lieutenant of the Royal Victorian Order (LVO) ===
- Christopher Michael Fitzgerald – on relinquishing his appointment as Deputy Private Secretary to the King – 29 January 2025
- Scott Furssedonn-Wood, MVO – on relinquishing his appointment as High Commissioner of the United Kingdom to Barbados – 21 May 2025
- Stephen Henry Ronald Marshall, MVO RVM – on relinquishment of the appointment as Yeoman of the Glass and China Pantry, Royal Household – 18 November 2025
- Peter George Kaye, AM, ESM – National Chief Executive Officer, The Duke of Edinburgh’s Award, Australia – 30 November 2025

=== Member of the Royal Victorian Order (MVO) ===
- Alison Kerr – Political Counsellor, British Embassy Rome – 10 April 2025
- Kassim Ramji – British Consul-General Milan and Director of the Department for Business and Trade in Italy – 10 April 2025
- Mirella Vertecchi – British Embassy Rome – 10 April 2025
- Captain Tarjan Gurung, The Royal Gurkha Rifles – on relinquishment of the role of The King's Gurkha Orderly Officer – 16 July 2025
- Captain Jagatram Rai, Queen's Gurkha Engineers – on relinquishment of the role of The King's Gurkha Orderly Officer – 16 July 2025
- Commander William Thornton, Royal Navy – on relinquishment of the appointment as Equerry to The King – 6 August 2025
- Dr Anabel Inge – Deputy Head of Mission, British Embassy to the Holy See – 23 October 2025
- Major Oliver Plunket – on relinquishing his appointment as Equerry to The Queen – 30 November 2025

Honorary

- Silvia Marinoni – Political Analyst, British Embassy Rome – 10 April 2025

== Royal Victorian Medal (RVM) ==
Royal Victorian Medal ribbon

Silver

- Pipe Major Paul Burns – on relinquishment of the appointment as His Majesty's Piper – 22 September 2025

== Most Excellent Order of the British Empire ==
Ribbon bar of the Order of the British Empire (Civil)

Ribbon bar of the Order of the British Empire (Military)

=== Dame Commander of the Order of the British Empire (DBE) ===
Civil Division

- The Honourable Ms. Justice Ruth Henke, KC – 21 January 2025
- The Honourable Ms. Justice Sonia Harris, KC – 21 January 2025

Honorary

- Sarina Wiegman CBE – England Women’s National Football Head Coach. For services to Association Football.

=== Commander of the Order of the British Empire (CBE) ===
Honorary

- Joshua Bell – Music Director, Academy of St Martin in the Fields. For services to Music – 16 October 2025
- Thomas Joseph Cahill – Former Chief Executive, Hertfordshire Partnership University NHS Foundation Trust. For services to Mental Health – 17 April 2025
- Professor Bart De Strooper – Professor in Dementia Research at the University College London and Francis Crick Institute; Founding Director of the UK Dementia Research Institute. For services to Dementia research in the UK and internationally – 16 October 2025
- Jürgen Klopp – Former Manager of Liverpool Football Club. For services to Football and the Community in Liverpool
- Dr Sunshik Min – Chairman & Chief Executive Officer of YBM. For services to UK/South Korea relations and UK Higher Education – 17 April 2025
- Christine Schwarzman – Founder and President of No Guarantees Productions. For services to UK Arts – 16 October 2025

=== Officer of the Order of the British Empire (OBE) ===
Honorary

- Dr Bakhtiyar Aslanbayli – Vice President, BP Caspian Region. For services to UK/Azerbaijan relations
- Apurv Bagri – Chairman Emeritus, London Business School. For services to education
- Mark Peter Beddy – Former Trustee and Chair of Finance Committee, British Council; Former Chair, English Touring Opera; Director and Chair of Finance Committee, London Symphony Orchestra. For services to Arts and Culture in the UK
- Michael Hadjiconstantas – Senior Crown Counsel, Sovereign Base Areas, Cyprus. For services to Defence and to law enforcement
- Professor Sabine Hauert – Professor, University of Bristol, Bristol Robotics Laboratory & Co-Founder, Robohub. For services to Robotics
- Maria Gertrude Hinfelaar – Former Vice Chancellor, Wrexham University. For services to Higher Education
- Atsushi Horiba – Chairman & Group CEO, HORIBA Ltd. For services to the UK automotive sector
- Karl John – Offshore Wind Specialist, Department for Business and Trade. For services to Offshore Wind Investment and Supply Chain Development in the UK
- Derek Kilmer – Former US Congressman, US House of Representatives. For services to UK/US relations – 17 April 2025
- Masayoshi Matsumoto – Chairman and Chief Executive Officer, Sumitomo Electric Industries Ltd. For services to UK/Japan trade and investment
- Darragh McCarthy – Founder and Chief Executive Officer, FinTrU Ltd. For services to the Economy in Northern Ireland
- Santiago Oñate Laborde – Former Lead of Investigation and Attribution Team, Organisation for the Prohibition of Chemical Weapons. For services to International Diplomacy and the Rule of Law – 17 April 2025
- Professor Dimitra Simeonidou, FREng – Director, Smart Internet Lab, University of Bristol. For services to Communications Technologies research and scientific policy – 17 April 2025
- Ana Paula Dente Vitelli – Former President, British Chamber of Commerce, Brazil. For services to British business in Brazil – 17 April 2025
- Dr Zoé Whitley – Art historian and Curator. For services to Art

=== Member of the Order of the British Empire (MBE) ===
Honorary

- Geert Prosper Paul Bekaert – Area Director Central and Southern Europe, Commonwealth War Graves Commission. For services to UK and Commonwealth First and Second World War commemorations
- Carla Bradshaw-Van Den Akker – SRMA for the Department for Education, Chair of the Federation of the Church Schools of Shalfleet and Freshwater & Yarmouth, and Chair of Ed-WISE Isle of Wight. For services to Education – 17 April 2025
- Miriam Patricia Brown – Honorary Secretary and Vice President, London Irish Amateur Rugby Football Club. For services to Grassroots Sport
- Bao Cao – Director Corporate Compliance, British Council Vietnam. For services to UK cultural relations in Vietnam – 17 April 2025
- Lynn Carvill – Chief Executive Officer WOMEN'STEC and Chair and Founder, Northern Ireland Women’s Budget Group. For services to the Economy in Northern Ireland – 17 April 2025
- Martina Cummins – Clinical Director Infection Prevention and Control, Bart's Health NHS Trust. For services to Infection Prevention and Patient Safety
- Young Hwoon (Herb) Kim – Technology Champion, Northern England. For Services to Technology in Northern England
- Justyna Kubica – Director Defence & Security Exports, British Embassy Warsaw. For services to UK/Poland Defence relations
- Teresa McCarthy-Dixon – Founder, The McCarthy-Dixon Foundation. For services to the community in Northamptonshire – 17 April 2025
- Darren O’Brien – Deputy Head, Retail, South-Eastern Railway. For services to the Victims of Domestic Abuse – 17 April 2025
- Lucas Parreira Lorini – Director, Market Access & Implementation, Latin America & Caribbean, Department for Business and Trade. For services to trade and investment – 17 April 2025
- Grant Elliott Rodney – Retired Lead for Paediatric Anaesthesia and Paediatric Surgical Services, Ninewells Hospital, NHS Tayside. For services to Children's Anaesthesia and Surgery, Dundee, Scotland – 17 April 2025
- Geraldine Roseberry – Foster Carer, London Borough of Redbridge. For services to Foster Care
- Maria da Anunciação Luísa de Sá Carneiro Soraes Beirão – National Director, Duke of Edinburgh International Award Portugal. For services to The Duke of Edinburgh’s International Award in Portugal – 17 April 2025
- Beatrix Schlarb-Ridley – Director of Innovation and Impact, British Antarctic Survey. For services to Innovation and Inclusion in Science
- Paul Senger-Weiss – Supervisory Board Chair Gebrüder Weiss, Honorary Consul Vorarlberg. For services to British nationals in Austria and to UK/Austria relations
- Zhanna Sevastianova – Head of English and School Education, British Council Ukraine. For services in support of UK/Ukraine cultural relations
- Rakiya Suleiman – Equality, Diversity and Inclusion Lead, NHS Lothian. For services to Eliminating Discrimination and Advancing Equality
- Dr Elizabeth Tissingh – Orthopaedic Surgeon and Head of King's College London Global Health Partnerships' work in the Democratic Republic of the Congo. For services to Health in the Democratic Republic of the Congo
- Peter Wallroth – Founder and Chief Executive, Mummy's Star. For services to Women’s Cancer Support

== British Empire Medal (BEM) ==
Ribbon bar of the British Empire Medal (Civil)

Honorary

- Bashir Ahmed – Chair, Pathfinderhub. For services to the Bangladeshi community in the UK – 17 April 2025
- Andreja Anžur Černič – Chair, MEPI (The Duke of Edinburgh’s International Award in Slovenia). For services to UK-Slovenia bilateral relations – 17 April 2025
- Moumini Bamogo – Gardener, British Embassy Abidjan. For services to the British Embassy in Abidjan
- Heike Bates – Caterer, HM Prison Full Sutton. For Public Service
- Dr Caroline Dowsett – Nurse Consultant, East London NHS Foundation Trust. For services to the NHS
- Ali Fakieh – Embassy Driver, British Embassy Beirut. For services to the British Embassy in Beirut
- Noel Franklin – Chairman Royal British Legion, Wexford. For services to the Royal British Legion in Ireland – 17 April 2025
- Pere Garriga Solà – Mayor of Arbúcies, Spain. For services to the memory of British nationals in Spain – 17 April 2025
- Sarah Goler Solecki – Equality, Diversity and Inclusion Engagement and Change Manager, Medical Research Council. For services to Equality, Diversity and Inclusion in Medical Research – 17 April 2025
- Lyubov Kostova – Member of Board of Trustees, Beautiful Science Foundation. For services to UK Science and Education – 17 April 2025
- Arunima Kumar – Dancer, Teacher and Choreographer. For services to Indian classical dance and community
- Bridget Patricia Mahon – Hotelier. For services to the community in the Royal Borough of Kensington and Chelsea
- Anders Mankert – Golf coach and PGA Master Professional. For services to Golf and to People with Disabilities
- Nain Bala Minhas – Director, Networking Key Services Limited. For services to empowering people experiencing Isolation and Deprivation in Edinburgh – 17 April 2025
- Pedro José Molina López – Driver, British Embassy, Spain. For services to the British Embassy in Spain – 17 April 2025
- Timo Pesonen – Residence Chef, British Embassy Helsinki. For services to the British Embassy Helsinki
- Marie Reilly – Shared Lives Coordinator, London Borough of Islington. For services to supporting families – 17 April 2025
- Albert Sifrar – Gardener, Commonwealth War Graves Commission, Klagenfurt. For services to First and Second World War commemorations
- Michele Upton – Lately Head of Maternity and Newborn Safety, NHS England. For services to Patient Safety in Maternity and Neonatal Services
- William Wright – Chief Creative Officer, Galveston Historic Foundation. For services to UK/US relations – 17 April 2025

== Knight Bachelor ==
Knight Bachelor ribbon

- The Honourable Mr. Justice Nicholas Cusworth, KC – 21 January 2025
- The Honourable Mr. Justice Timothy Mould, KC – 21 January 2025
- The Honourable Mr. Justice Clive Sheldon, KC – 21 January 2025
- The Honourable Mr. Justice Stephen Trowell, KC – 21 January 2025
- The Honourable Mr. Justice Dexter Dias, KC – 21 January 2025
- The Honourable Mr. Justice Nicholas Thompsell, KC – 21 January 2025
- The Honourable Mr. Justice Damian Garrido, KC – 21 January 2025
- The Honourable Mr. Justice Richard Harrison, KC – 21 January 2025

== Imperial Service Medal ==
Ribbon bar of the Imperial Service Medal

- Appointments 21 January 2025
- Appointments 8 April 2025
- Appointment 13 May 2025
- Appointments 14 October 2025

== Order of St John ==
Order of St John ribbon

=== Great Officers of the Order ===
- As Prelate – Archbishop Emeritus Sir David Moxon, KNZM – 24 June 2025
- As Sub Prior – Dr Michel C Doré – 24 June 2025

=== Bailiff Grand Cross of the Order of St John (GCStJ) ===
- Sir David Hempleman-Adams, KCVO OBE DL – 23 January 2025
- Stuart Waetzel – 23 January 2025

=== Knight of the Order of St John (KStJ) ===
- Alderman Alastair John Naisbitt King, DL – 23 January 2025
- Rear Admiral Simon Paul Williams, CB CVO – 23 January 2025
- Major Brendan Patrick Wood, DSD ED – 23 January 2025
- Captain Mark Charles Keyworth Broughton – 7 April 2025
- Professor Kevin Davies, MBE RRC DL – 7 April 2025
- Marc Maitland Farror – 7 April 2025
- John Macaskill – 7 April 2025
- Paul Anthony Martin – 7 April 2025
- Daniel Edward Riley – 7 April 2025
- Yau Shu-fung – 7 April 2025
- Professor Mark Alexander Taylor, DL – 7 April 2025
- James Richard Terzian – 7 April 2025
- David Morris Yudain – 7 April 2025

=== Dame of the Order of St John (DStJ) ===
- Nicola Nora Gini – 23 January 2025
- Beryl Ann Greenaway – 23 January 2025
- Her Excellency the Honourable Ms Sam Mostyn, AC – 23 January 2025
- Ellen Metzger Lecompte – 7 April 2025

=== Commander of the Order of St John (CStJ) ===
Appointments 23 January 2024

- Professor Agyeman Badu Akosa – 7 April 2025
- Hilda Naa Sakua Commey – 7 April 2025
- Butler Carson Derrick III – 7 April 2025
- Maryann Morgan Davis – 7 April 2025
- David Alan Disi – 7 April 2025
- Kathryn Elizabeth Doul – 23 September 2025
- The Reverend David Michael Goldberg – 7 April 2025
- Linda Heaney – 7 April 2025
- Howard Bicknell Hodgson Jr – 7 April 2025
- Craig Alexander Jones – 7 April 2025
- Dr. Andrew Derek Ronald Kerr – 7 April 2025
- Matthew Sterrett Leddicotte – 7 April 2025
- Air Marshal Clare Samantha Walton – 23 September 2025
- Professor Mark Sheridan, QVRM, DL – 23 September 2025

=== Officer of the Order of St John (OStJ) ===
- Appointments 23 January 2024
- Appointments 7 April 2025
- Appointments 23 September 2025

=== Member of the Order of St John (MStJ) ===
- Appointments 23 January 2024
- Appointments 7 April 2025
- Appointments 23 September 2025

== George Medal (GM) ==
Ribbon of the George Medal

- Grace O'Malley-Kumar – 6 October 2025 (posthumous) – for intervening in an armed attack in Nottingham on 13 June 2023
- Nathan Newby – 6 October 2025 – for intervening in a suspected bombing at St James's University Hospital in Leeds on 20 January 2023

== King's Gallantry Medal (KGM) ==
Ribbon of the King's Gallantry Medal

- Richard O'Brien – 6 October 2025 – for intervening in an armed attack in Barnet on 21 September 2021
- Thomas Cook – 6 October 2025 – for intervening in an armed attack on an approved premises in Hampshire on 1 December 2023
- Daniel Jones – 6 October 2025 – for his actions during an insurgent attack on the Anjuman base, Kabul, in November 2018

== Meritorious Service Medal ==
Ribbon of the Meritorious Service Medal

Navy

- POLOG(CS), W. S. Champs, RN, D216846M – 14 January 2025
- WO1, S. Clark, RM, P051720B – 14 January 2025
- WO2, B. T. Coker, RM, P061242W – 14 January 2025
- WO1ET(ME), R. T. Crozier, RN, D204498X – 14 January 2025
- WO1(MW), D. V. Dean, RN, D237311W – 14 January 2025
- WO2(D), M. J. Doherty, RN, D247532F – 14 January 2025
- CPOET(MESM)(EL), I. G. C. Hamblin, RN, D207938U – 14 January 2025
- WO1WS(TSM), N. J. Harvey, RN, D205492U – 14 January 2025
- CPOET(CIS), A. J. Hunt, RN, W145723P – 14 January 2025
- WO2LOG(CS), D. R. S. Knibbs, RN, D232711X – 14 January 2025
- WO1WS(AWT), D. Lennon, RN, D235001K – 14 January 2025
- CPOACMN(ASW), A. Mayes, RN, D250670U – 14 January 2025
- WO1, J. I. Melhuish, RM, P054681M – 14 January 2025
- WO2, S. A. N. Muir, RM, P056589N – 14 January 2025
- WO1, H. B. Robb, RM, P058196W – 14 January 2025
- CPOMA(CDO), M. J. Rodway, RN, P060473H – 14 January 2025
- WO1MA, D. Rowley, RN, D239643B – 14 January 2025
- WO1, S. P. Stroud, RM, P058690R – 14 January 2025
- CPOWS(AWT), B. M. V. Thompson, RN, D215962F – 14 January 2025
- WO1ET(ME), M. Watkins, RN, D204830M – 14 January 2025
- WO1AET, S. M. Wilson, RN, D236638G – 14 January 2025
- WO1, S. M. Clark, RM, P054142R – 14 January 2025
- WO2 GD PTI, R. C. Conde, RM, P060033P – 14 January 2025
- WO1ET(CIS), T. D. Dawson, RN, D236302B – 14 January 2025
- WO1(sea), D. Deakin, MBE, RN, D190337U – 14 January 2025
- CPOET(WE), B. F. A. Donnelly, RN, D253950Y – 14 January 2025
- WO1(HM), E. B. Fitzsommons, RN, D235101D – 14 January 2025
- WO1ET(ME), M. B. Griffiths, RN, D202126Y – 14 January 2025
- WO1 MUSN, P. D. Hawkins, RM, P055505P – 14 January 2025
- WO1(AH), S. D. Iiszard, RN, D237171P – 14 January 2025
- WO1GD(CD), T. D. Jukes, RM, P053791D – 14 January 2025
- WO2ART(V), B. Keeling, RM, P049373Y – 14 January 2025
- WO1(AET), R. J. G. H. B. Knaggs, RN, D236718Q – 14 January 2025
- WO1WS(AWW), G. Moffat, RN, D237173W – 14 January 2025
- CPOWS(AWW), S. W. J. More, RN, D257765P – 14 January 2025
- CPO(D), J. L. F. O’Brien, RN, D229474M – 14 January 2025
- WO1 (NSFPS), C. L. Robson, RN, W143829R – 14 January 2025

Army

- WO1, M. J. Anderson, R SIGNALS, 25140140 – 14 January 2025
- WO1, R. S. H. Banfield, DFC, AAC, 24683565 – 14 January 2025
- WO1, P. Bernthal, REME, 25039380 – 14 January 2025
- SSGT, T. D. Bindng, REME, 25099132 – 14 January 2025
- WO2, A. D. Butterworth, RE, 25155622 – 14 January 2025
- CAPT, A. D. Cooksey, RA, 25117103 – 14 January 2025
- CAPT, L. T. Dinsmore, REME, 25112682 – 14 January 2025
- WO2, D. L. Duckitt, YORKS, 25094149 – 14 January 2025
- WO2, Kulbahadur, Ghale RGR, 21169413 – 14 January 2025
- CAPT, M. K. Giles, CGC, MERCIAN, 25061745 – 14 January 2025
- WO1, P. J. Greenway, RA, 25122484 – 14 January 2025
- WO1, A. C. Ireland, PARA, 25129999 – 14 January 2025
- WO1, Manojkumar, Jugjali, RGR, 21170445 – 14 January 2025
- WO2, C. L. Lambert, RA, W1042560 – 14 January 2025
- WO1, J. L. Lightfoot, RA, 25157521 – 14 January 2025
- CAPT, D. A. Long, RIFLES, 25120000 – 14 January 2025
- WO1, J. D. Mayoh, RA, 25159471 – 14 January 2025
- CAPT, S. R. McCreadie, R SIGNALS, 25122177 – 14 January 2025
- WO1, P. S. Meager, REME, 25105091 – 14 January 2025
- CAPT, R. D. O’Neill, SCOTS, 25114429 – 14 January 2025
- WO1, J. E. Phillips, REME, 25042932 – 14 January 2025
- WO2, M. J. Potts, RAMC, 25105222 – 14 January 2025
- WO2, P. Rai, RAMC, 21170492 – 14 January 2025
- WO2, K. Reains, IG, 25161644 – 14 January 2025
- WO1, J. W. Reid, REME, 25094683 – 14 January 2025
- WO1, J. O. Richardson, RA, 25061171 – 14 January 2025
- WO1, A. C. Rusche, RAMC, 25157799 – 14 January 2025
- WO1, G. S. Sewell-Jones, RCAM, 24877757 – 14 January 2025
- WO1, P. Shennan, REME, 25146139 – 14 January 2025
- WO1, M. L. Silvester, AGC(SPS), W1033676 – 14 January 2025
- CAPT, G. A. Smurthwaite, PARA, 25155719 – 14 January 2025
- WO2, D. R. J. Steel, SCOTS DG, 25124936 – 14 January 2025
- WO1, J. I. Sweeney, AAC, 24791030 – 14 January 2025
- CAPT, T. A. Tuhey, RAPTC, 25116409 – 14 January 2025
- WO2, G. F. F. W. Vesi, AGC(SPS), 25139940 – 14 January 2025
- CAPT, J. G. Werrett, MERCIAN, 25130427 – 14 January 2025
- WO1, J. T. Williams, REME, 25151354 – 14 January 2025
- WO1, M. J. Williams, R SIGNALS, 25132892 – 14 January 2025
- WO1, D. Wood, REME, 25116001 – 14 January 2025
- WO1, C. M. Woodall, RAVC, 25129514 – 14 January 2025
- WO2, R. S. Young, WG, 25102911 – 14 January 2025
- CAPT, T. S. G. Allatt, REME, 25110721 – 14 January 2025
- WO1, B. H. Armstrong, R SIGNALS, 25122026 – 14 January 2025
- WO1, L. Aspey, AAC, 24872897 – 14 January 2025
- WO1, D. G. Bailey, GREN GDS, 25112825 – 14 January 2025
- WO1, G. J. Bamford, R SIGNALS, 25084015 – 14 January 2025
- SSGT, L. J. Banton, RA, W1044321 – 14 January 2025
- WO1, G. R. Begley, RA, W1047746 – 14 January 2025
- WO2, J. L. Blackburn, R SIGNALS, W1042094 – 14 January 2025
- WO1, D. P. Bromage, REME, 24964745 – 14 January 2025
- CAPT, N. J. M. Brown, SCOTS DG, 25095926 – 14 January 2025
- WO1, P. Burns, INFANTRY, 25110810 – 14 January 2025
- WO2, M. W. Catarall, MERCIAN, 25125351 – 14 January 2025
- WO1, A. P. Catling, RLC, 25124173 – 14 January 2025
- WO1, D. J. Cattermole, R SIGNALS, 25116296 – 14 January 2025
- WO1, M. P. Chester, RLC, 25104379 – 14 January 2025
- WO2, Sombahadur, Chhantel MAGAR, RGR, 21170660 – 14 January 2025
- WO1, J. L. Clifton, REME, 25148601 – 14 January 2025
- WO2, P. Connor, REME, 24795504 – 14 January 2025
- WO1, M. K. Constantine RLC, 25076607 – 14 January 2025
- WO1, D. P. Cope, WG, 25102725 – 14 January 2025
- WO1, P. E. Daniel, INFANTRY, 25104333 – 14 January 2025
- WO2, S. L. Ebsworth, INT CORPS, 24963679 – 14 January 2025
- CAPT, L. Estwick, INFANTRY, 25114365 – 14 January 2025
- CAPT, A. C. Ferrier, SCOTS, 25124195 – 14 January 2025
- WO1, S. H. Forse, AGC, W1036204 – 14 January 2025
- WO1, K. J. Fortunato, RG, 30263150 – 14 January 2025
- WO1, C. J. Groves, PARA, 25163693 – 14 January 2025
- SSGT, L. Haworth, R SIGNALS, W1043951 – 14 January 2025
- WO1, G. C. Hughes, REME, 25139498 – 14 January 2025
- WO1, G. A. Hyatt, RA, 25116647 – 14 January 2025
- WO1, M. D. Iddon, R SIGNALS, 25122288 – 14 January 2025
- WO1, D. J. Inocco, REME, 25161589 – 14 January 2025
- WO1, R. J. Johnson, WG, 25157883 – 14 January 2025
- WO1, D. Jones, RA, 25134173 – 14 January 2025
- WO1, N. J. Kennedy, AAC, 24824902 – 14 January 2025
- WO1, S. M. King, REME, 25111563 – 14 January 2025
- WO1, D. P. Mahoney, REME, 25119239 – 14 January 2025
- WO1, G. R. McConaughy, REME, 25125799 – 14 January 2025
- WO1, D. J. McGee, RA, 25157421 – 14 January 2025
- WO1, R. J. Mukungunugwa, RL, 25151175 – 14 January 2025
- WO1, L. M. Newburn, RAMC, Q1042101 – 14 January 2025
- CAPT, C. S. Nicol, RHG/D, 25140169 – 14 January 2025
- WO1, B. W. A. Owers, REME, 24867134 – 14 January 2025
- WO2, S. B. Qarau, RA, 25149000 – 14 January 2025
- CAPT, Raj, Rai, RGR, 21171132 – 14 January 2025
- WO2, M. A. Skewis, SASC, 25169703 – 14 January 2025
- WO1, R. M. Teague, AGC(RMP), 25156417 – 14 January 2025
- WO1, S. P. Teasdale, AGC(SPS), 25045649 – 14 January 2025
- WO1, K. R. Tuach, SCOTS, 25121635 – 14 January 2025
- CAPT, Dikbahadue, Tumkhewa Limbu, RGR, 21170887 – 14 January 2025
- SSGT, B. M. A. Willett, RE, 25182598 – 14 January 2025
- CAPT, S. Wilson, LANCS, 25115986 – 14 January 2025
- CAPT, C. J. Wood, R SIGNALS, 25118978 – 14 January 2025

Air Force

- FLT LT, J. Blinkhorn, RAF, F8285995 – 14 January 2025
- CHF TECH, D. G. Bristow, RAF, L8443545 – 14 January 2025
- WO, D. P. Burke, RAF, P8404798 – 14 January 2025
- WO, W. O. R. Clements, RAF, H8431731 – 14 January 2025
- WO, N. W. Cook, RAF, R8445166 – 14 January 2025
- MACR, A. R. Davey, AFC, RAF, F8424849 – 14 January 2025
- FLT LT, H. Dimeck, RAF, Q8244311 – 14 January 2025
- FS, K. S. Edwards, RAF, S8424938 – 14 January 2025
- WO, J. C. Foxall RAF, S8442821 – 14 January 2025
- FLT LT, F. E. Hunt, RAF, H8311618 – 14 January 2025
- WO, D. G. Jackson, RAF, P8446117 – 14 January 2025
- WO, K. E. Jones, RAF, A8283202 – 14 January 2025
- SGT, E. P. Jones, RAF, C8439378 – 14 January 2025
- WO, E. L. Kerslake, RAF, Q8308386 – 14 January 2025
- WO, M. E. Larkin, RAF, T8153371 – 14 January 2025
- WO, D. A. Lawrence, RAF, C8426114 – 14 January 2025
- WO, R. Laycock, RAF, B8241357 – 14 January 2025
- WO, A. S. Macdonald, RAF, B8404404 – 14 January 2025
- WO, B. Moore, RAF, Q8438167 – 14 January 2025
- FS, M. J. Moore, RAF, H8431768 – 14 January 2025
- FS, J. C. O’Grady, RAF, D8153657 – 14 January 2025
- WO, C. L. S. Old, RAF, S8245256 – 14 January 2025
- MACR, S. R. Parsons, RAF, F2643534 – 14 January 2025
- WO, K. N. Phillips, RAF, B8412605 – 14 January 2025
- WO, S. G. Rowbotham, RAF, K8411113 – 14 January 2025
- FS, J. A. Simpkins, RAF, R8242632 – 14 January 2025
- FS, C. A. Smith, RAF, J8154666 – 14 January 2025
- FS, P. S. Ware, RAF, B8445763 – 14 January 2025
- FS, L. A. Williams RAF, J8244423 – 14 January 2025
- WO, A. Wilson, RAF, H8255229 – 14 January 2025
- WO, P. B. Wilson, MBE, RAF, E8423564 – 14 January 2025
- WO, S. M. Wooles, RAF, C8412792 – 14 January 2025
- FLT LT, S. Blackett, RAF, C8407913 – 14 January 2025
- FS, A. J. Booth, RAF, P8417542 – 14 January 2025
- CHF TECH, S. E. Buck, RAF, B8418047 – 14 January 2025
- FS, S. G. Buffey, RAF, B8440423 – 14 January 2025
- WO, M. Cranston, RAF, B8409153 – 14 January 2025
- WO, K. Davies, RAF, C8427530 – 14 January 2025
- WO, C. A. Dineen, RAF, E8446243 – 14 January 2025
- WO, M. Evans, RAF, S8425003 – 14 January 2025
- FS, S. A. Evans, RAF, C8444696 – 14 January 2025
- MACR, N. Everingham, RAF, S8428923 – 14 January 2025
- FS, A. P. Field, RAF, J8437370 – 14 January 2025
- MACR, J. Fowler. RAF, K8261060 – 14 January 2025
- WO, N. A. Harries, RAF, J8418990 – 14 January 2025
- FS, H. J. Hulme, RAF, Q8500219 – 14 January 2025
- FS, M. D. John, RAF, F8442688 – 14 January 2025
- WO, P. M. Lilliman, RAF, B8430282 – 14 January 2025
- SGT, B. J. Maclean, RAF, B8438370 – 14 January 2025
- WO, M. Martin, RAF, L8238333 – 14 January 2025
- WO, E. M. C. Massey, RAF, B8447460 – 14 January 2025
- WO, N. D. Phipps, RAF, E8501331 – 14 January 2025
- WO, C. L. Rowland, RAF, J8408565 – 14 January 2025
- FS, P. Sharpe, RAF, S8261030 – 14 January 2025
- FS, G. Steel, RAF, 30007841 – 14 January 2025
- WO, A. J. P. Thompson, RAF, Q8284092 – 14 January 2025
- WO, D. R. Ward, RAF, K8292318 – 14 January 2025

== King's Commendation for Bravery ==
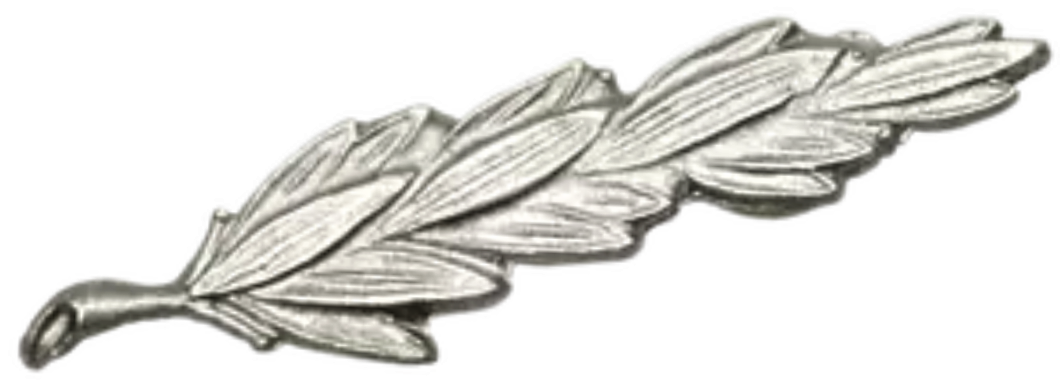
King's Commendation for Bravery

- Luke Griffin – 6 October 2025 (posthumous) – for his actions during an insurgent attack on the Anjuman base, Kabul, in November 2018
- Michael Kelly – 6 October 2025 – for his actions during an insurgent attack on the Anjuman base, Kabul, in November 2018
- Daniel Dunnings – 6 October 2025 – for his actions during an insurgent attack on the Anjuman base, Kabul, in November 2018
- Gerald McCafferty – 6 October 2025 – for an attempted rescue during a diving incident in Caernarfon Bay, North Wales on 12 September 2021
- Bernard Turner – 6 October 2025 – for an attempted rescue during a diving incident in Caernarfon Bay, North Wales on 12 September 2021
- Richard Woodcock – 6 October 2025 (posthumous) – for intervening in an armed attack on 26 June 2021
- PC Mark Sutton – 6 October 2025 – for rescuing a man falling from a bridge on 22 November 2023
- PC Thomas Dransfield – 6 October 2025 – for rescuing a man falling from a bridge on 22 November 2023
- SC Gregory Beaumont – 6 October 2025 – for rescuing a woman from the River Thames on 17 June 2023
- Grant McGarry – 6 October 2025 – for intervening in an armed robbery in Wool, Dorset on 7 October 2016
- Nigel Dunmore – 6 October 2025 – for intervening in an armed robbery in Wool, Dorset on 7 October 2016
- Alicia Richards – 6 October 2025 – for intervening in an armed attack at a school in Sheffield on 1 May 2024
- Molly Bulmer – 6 October 2025 – for intervening in an armed attack at a school in Sheffield on 1 May 2024
- PC Rhona Adams – 6 October 2025 – for intervening to rescue a woman on fire at a restaurant in Bradford on 10 June 2024
- Sergeant Timothy Ansell – 6 October 2025 – for intervening in an armed attack in Manchester on 26 July 2023
