= Peter Howells =

Peter Howells may refer to:

- Peter Howells (economist), Professor of Monetary Economics at the Bristol Business school
- Peter Howells (cricketer) (born 1981), English cricketer

== See also ==
- Peter Howell (disambiguation)
