= Lyndon Smith (academic) =

English academic (born 1964)

- Born: Lyndon Neal Smith; 26 December 1964 (age 61); Stroud, Gloucestershire, England
- Education: University of Wales (BSc); Cranfield Institute of Technology (MSc); University of the West of England (PhD)
- Scientific career
- Fields: Computer simulation Machine vision
- Thesis: A knowledge based system for powder metallurgy technology (1997)
- Doctoral advisor: Sagar Midha
- Website: Lyndon Smith

Lyndon Neal Smith (born 26 December 1964) is an English academic who is Professor in Computer Simulation and Machine Vision at the School of Engineering at the University of the West of England. He is also Director of the Centre for Machine Vision at the Bristol Robotics Laboratory.

== Early life ==
Smith was born in Stroud, Gloucestershire, on 26 December 1964 to Lionel Alfred Smith and Dorothy Smith. He received a Bachelor of Science (BSc) from the University of Wales in 1986, a Master of Science (MSc) from the Cranfield Institute of Technology in 1988, and a Doctor of Philosophy (PhD) from the University of the West of England in 1997. His PhD thesis was entitled A knowledge based system for powder metallurgy technology. He completed a secondment at the Pennsylvania State University which lasted for a year.

== Career ==
Smith is Professor in Computer Simulation and Machine Vision at the School of Engineering at the University of the West of England. He is also Director of the Centre for Machine Vision at the Bristol Robotics Laboratory.

He has developed a technique for the simulation of the packing densities of particles with irregular morphologies.

He helped develop 3D face recognition technology which he said was "on the verge of becoming really big" in 2017.

Smith has been involved in plans to replace turnstiles on the London Underground with a facial recognition system. He said that facial recognition technology under development could replace train tickets, and have applications in stores, train stations and banks.

== Personal life ==
Smith has lived in Wedmore, Somerset, for over 18 years, and formerly served as a member of Wedmore Parish Council. His hobbies include listening to British classical music and light music, as well as painting.

== Selected publications ==
- Shahbaz, A.; Yunas, S.; Smith, L. N.; Staddon, C. (December 2023). Estimating water storage from images. IEEE International Conference on Big Data. Sorrento, Italy.
- Smith, L. N.; Boyd, S.; Bhatta, D.; Smith, M. L. (July 2023). 3D Machine Vision and Deep Learning for Enabling Automated and Sustainable Assistive Physiotherapy. International Conference on Health Informatics and Medical Systems (HIMS). Las Vegas, US.
- Olisah, C. C.; Smith, L. N.; Smith, M. L. (July 2022). Maize yield predictive models and mobile-based decision support system for smallholder farmers in Africa. 17th International Conference on Machine Learning and Data Mining (MLDM 2022). New York, US.
- Olisah, C. C.; Smith, L. N.; Smith, M. L. (June 2022). "Diabetes mellitus prediction and diagnosis from a data preprocessing and machine learning perspective". Computer Methods and Programs in Biomedicine. 220. doi:10.1016/j.cmpb.2022.106773.
- Smith, M. L.; Smith, L. N.; Hansen, M. F. (September 2021). "The quiet revolution in machine vision-a state-of-the-art survey paper, including historical review, perspectives, and future directions". Computers in Industry. 130. doi:10.1016/j.compind.2021.103472.
- Atkinson, G. A.; Smith, L. N.; Smith, M. L.; Reynolds, C. K.; Humphries, D. J.; Moorby, J. M.; Leemans, D. K.; Kingston-Smith, A. H. (October 2020). "A computer vision approach to improving cattle digestive health by the monitoring of faecal samples". Scientific Reports. 10. doi:10.1038/s41598-020-74511-0. PMC 7568556.
- Smith, L. N.; Huang, N.; Hansen, M. F.; Smith, M. L. (July 2020). Deep 3D Face Recognition using 3D Data Augmentation and Transfer Learning. 16th International Conference on Machine Learning and Data Mining MLDM'2020. Amsterdam, Netherlands.
- Smith, L. N.; Byrne, A.; Hansen, M. F.; Zhang, W.; Smith, M. L. (August 2019). Weed classification in grasslands using convolutional neural networks. Applications of Machine Learning, SPIE Optics Photonics.
- Smith, L. N.; Zhang, W.; Smith, M. L. (August 2018). 2D and 3D Face Analysis for Ticketless Rail Travel. 2IPCV'18: 2nd International Conference on Image Processing, Computer Vision, & Pattern Recognition. Las Vegas, US.
- Hansen, M. F.; Smith, M. L.; Smith, L. N.; Salter, M. G.; Baxter, E. M.; Farish, M.; Grieve, B. (June 2018). "Towards on-farm pig face recognition using convolutional neural networks". Computers in Industry. 98: 145–152. doi:10.1016/j.compind.2018.02.016.
- Smith, L. N.; Zhang, W.; Hansen, M. F.; Hales, I.; Smith, M. L. (May 2018). "Innovative 3D and 2D machine vision methods for analysis of plants and crops in the field". Computers in Industry. 97: 122–131. doi:10.1016/j.compind.2018.02.002. PMC 6034441. PMID 29997402.
- Smith, L. N.; Farooq, A. R.; Smith, M. L.; Ivanov, I. E.; Orlando, A. (June 2017). "Realistic and interactive high-resolution 4D environments for real-time surgeon and patient interaction" (PDF). International Journal of Medical Robotics and Computer Assisted Surgery. 97 (2): 122–131. doi:10.1002/rcs.1761. PMID 27439562. S2CID 4049782.
- Abdul Jabbar, K.; Hansen, M. F.; Smith, M. L.; Smith, L. N. (January 2017). "Early and non-intrusive lameness detection in dairy cows using 3-dimensional video" (PDF). Biosystems Engineering. 153: 63–69. Bibcode:2017BiSyE.153...63A. doi:10.1016/j.biosystemseng.2016.09.017. S2CID 64782705.
- Abdul Jabbar, K.; Hansen, M. F.; Smith, M. L.; Smith, L. N. (29–31 October 2016). Overhead spine arch analysis of dairy cows from three-dimensional video. Eighth International Conference on Graphic and Image Processing (ICGIP 2016). Tokyo, Japan.
- Abdul Jabbar, K.; Hansen, M. F.; Smith, M. L.; Smith, L. N. (20–21 October 2016). Quadruped locomotion analysis using three-dimensional video. IEEE ICSAE Conference. Newcastle, England.

=== Books ===
- Smith, L. N. (2003). A knowledge-based System for Powder Metallurgy Technology. Professional Engineering Publishing. ISBN 1860584020.
- Smith, Lyndon N. (2020). Why You Can't Catch a Rocket to Mars: Some Personal Reflections on Science and Society. The Berkeley Bookstore. ISBN 979-8566552750.
- Smith, Lyndon N. (2021). STAR TREK NATION: An Englishman's view of America. Sedgemoor Books. ISBN 979-8498760865.
- Smith, Lyndon N. (2023). Wonders of the West. Sedgemoor Books. ISBN 979-8388977991.
