= Ruth Henke =

British judge

The Honourable Ms Justice Henke
- Royal coat of arms of the United Kingdom

Justice of the High Court
- Incumbent
- Assumed office 29 September 2023
- Appointed by: Charles III

Dame Ruth Sara Margaret Henke is a British judge who is a justice of the High Court.

== Biography ==
Henke grew up in South Wales. The first of her family to go to university, she studied jurisprudence at Worcester College at the University of Oxford (1983-86).

Henke was called to the Bar at the Inner Temple in 1987 and took Silk in 2006. She worked at Iscoed Chambers and then 30 Park Place. In 2013, she became a QC. In 2018, she was appointed as a Deputy High Court Judge assigned to the Family Division. She was appointed to the High Court on 29 September 2023. She received a damehood in the 2025 Special Honours.

== See also ==
- List of High Court judges of England and Wales
- List of dames commander of the Order of the British Empire
