= Dimitra Simeonidou =

Telecommunications researcher

Dimitra Simeonidou FREng
- Born: Dimitra E. Simeonidou
- Education: Aristotle University of Thessaloniki; University of Essex
- Awards: Royal Society Wolfson Fellowship
- Scientific career
- Fields: Telecommunication
- Workplaces: University of Essex; University of Bristol
- Thesis: An experimental investigation of Raman and erbium doped fibre amplifiers for use in optical communication systems (1994)
- Website: www.bris.ac.uk/engineering/people/dimitra-simeonidou

Dimitra E. Simeonidou FREng is a Professor of High Performance Networks at the University of Bristol, and a member of the European Commission's Group of Chief Scientific Advisors. She works on the development of telecommunications networks, including 5G, and is a specialist in smart city infrastructures.

== Early life and education ==
Simeonidou studied engineering at the Aristotle University of Thessaloniki, where she earned a bachelor's degree in 1987 and master's degree in 1989. She moved to the University of Essex for her doctoral studies, and earned a PhD in 1994.

== Research and career ==
After graduating she spent four years at Alcatel Submarine Networks, where she worked as Chief Engineer and introduced wavelength-division multiplexing networks. She returned to Essex in 1998, where she established the High Performance Network group.

In 2012 Simeonidou was appointed a Professor at the University of Bristol, where she Directs the Smart Internet Lab and High-Performance Networks group. She studies high performance networks and wireless-optical convergence. In 2017 it was announced that Simeonidou would lead the University of Bristol efforts to become a testbed for 5G technologies. Her group designed a small 5G emitting box which can ensure connectivity on the move. She is responsible for the city of Bristol's 5G urban pilots and leads experiments on the UK's 5G test network.

Simeonidou is the chief technology officer (CTO) of the "Bristol is Open" project, which is a joint project between the Bristol City Council and University of Bristol. Bristol is Open provides a test bed for research in future communication technologies. She was awarded a Royal Society Wolfson Fellowship to develop these technologies. Simeonidou founded two University spin-off companies, Ilotron, which was acquired by Altamar in 2001, and Zeetta Networks. Zeetta delivers software-defined networking (SDN) platforms for enterprise networks. She has investigated the use of quantum cryptography to protect 5G networks. In 2018 Simeonidou worked with the Government of the United Kingdom on their Future Telecoms Infrastructure Review, which outlined the strategy to make the United Kingdom a world leader in 5G.

She is interested in ways that 5G can transform skills development and cultural experiences. Working with Zeetta, the BBC and Cambridge Communication Systems, Simeonidou demonstrated a 5G-enabled tourism catalyst project at the 2019 Digital Transformation World conference in Nice. The catalyst allowed visitors to immerse themselves in history of the sites they were visiting using virtual reality. The demonstrations included an animation to bring to life the Roman Baths. The application used 5G network slicing, low latency and Multi-access Edge Computing (MEC) to provide a resilient service. She has also worked with Jamie Cullum and the charity Music for All to deliver the world's first music lessons across 5G networks. She was announced as the head of the University of Bristol Digital Futures Institute in 2019.

Alongside her research, Simeonidou is committed to increasing the representation of women in engineering.

=== Awards and honours ===
In 2019 Simeonidou was elected a Fellow of the Royal Academy of Engineering (FREng). She is the first woman at the University of Bristol to be elected a Fellow. That same year, she was also elected as a Fellow of IEEE for contributions to optical networking systems and applications. In the 2025 Special Honours, Simeonidou was awarded an Honorary Officer of the Order of the British Empire (OBE) by King Charles III "for services to Communications Technologies research and scientific policy".
