= Arunima Kumar =

Arunima Kumar BEM
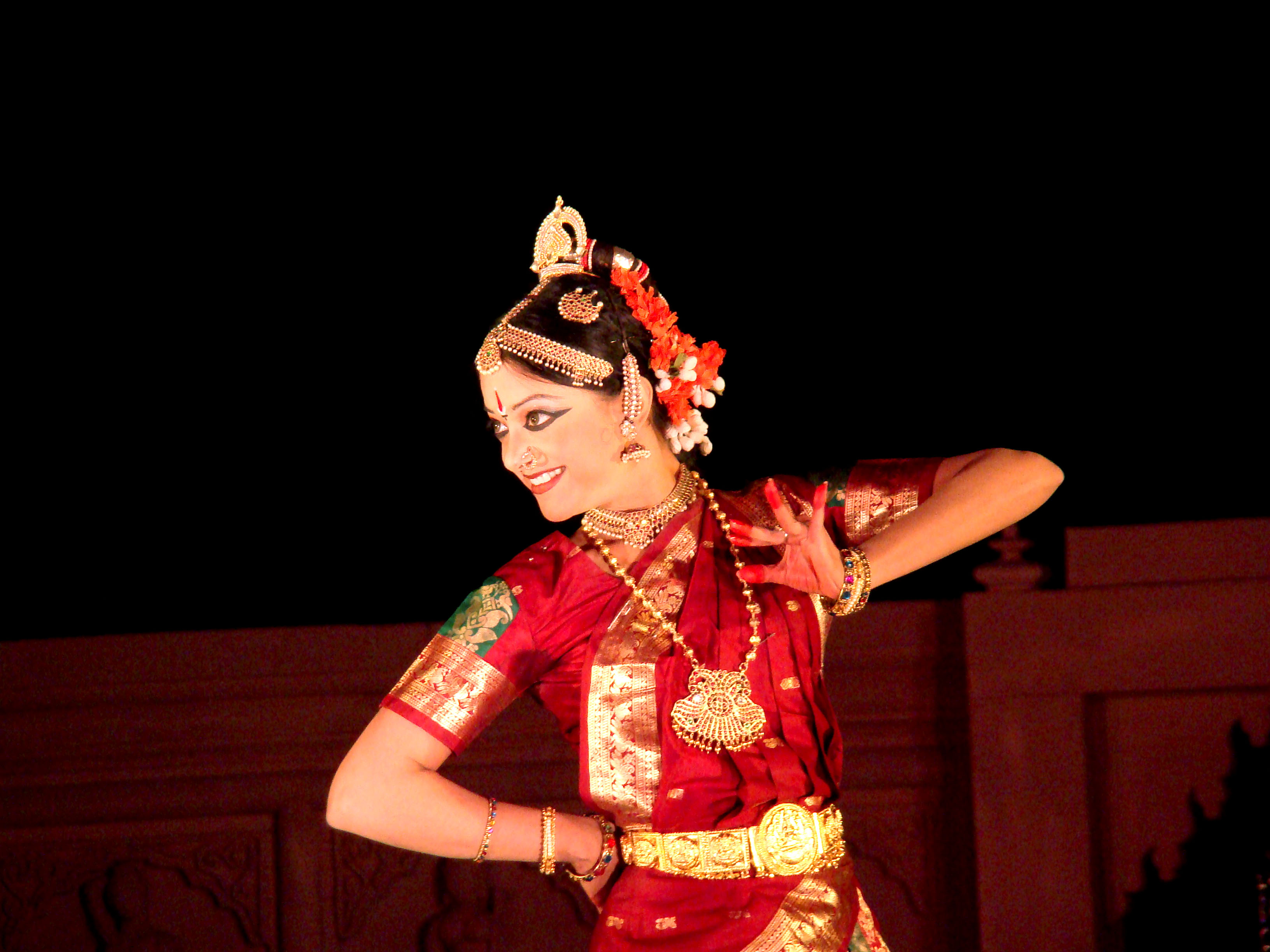
- Arunima Kumar performing in Khajuraho Dance Festival on 5 February 2010

Background information
- Born: 1 July 1978 (age 47)
- Origin: New Delhi India, currently living in London.
- Genres: Kuchipudi
- Occupations: Dancer; HR Consultant at Aricent .
- Website: http://www.arunimakumar.com

Arunima Kumar, Sangeet Natak Akademi Yuva Puraskar awardee for the year of 2008 for Kuchipudi. As a young girl of 9, Arunima acted in the ballet Amrapali. The Kuchipudi Dance Academy formally launched her in 1995 where she performed her Arangetram at the Triveni Kala Sangam, New Delhi.

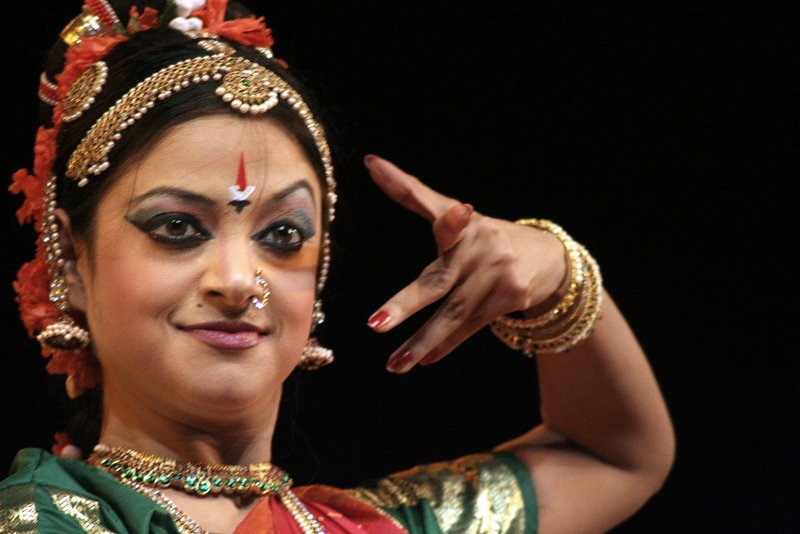
Arunima Kumar Sahiya Natak Academi Awardee

== About ==
Arunima is a Kuchipudi dancer and a recipient of Sangeet Natak Akademi's ( India's national academy set-up by the Republic of India) prestigious Ustad Bismillah Khan Yuva Puraskaar for 2008. Currently she lives in London and is working as a HR Consultant at Aricent Group.

== Start of career ==
Arunima started learning Kuchipudi at the age of 7 and had her initial training under Padma Bhushan Smt Swapna Sundari. She is a senior disciple of Padmashree Guru JayaRama Rao and Vanasree Rao and has been performing for over 15 years. As a young girl of 9, Arunima acted in the ballet Amrapali. The Kuchipudi Dance Academy formally launched her in 1995 where she performed her Rangapravesham at the Triveni Kala Sangam, New Delhi.

From then on Arunima pursued her art and has given several national and international performances at prestigious cultural festivals and venues.

== Notable performances ==
Her notable performances include the Rashtrapati Bhawan (President House, Delhi), Sydney Opera House, Canberra Festival, Expo 2000 in Hannover and Lisbon, Nehru Center in London, Tagore Center in Berlin, Asian Arts Festival in Manila, Kuchipudi Convention in USA in 2008, Hyderabad Arts Festival, Kuchipudi Festival etc.

She has also performed in several ballets like the, Chitrangada Ballet, where she played the role of Chitrangada; Nala Damayanti, where she played the role of Damayanti

Arunima has also been recognized with the Sahitya Kala Parishad Scholarship for Dance in 1998 and the Shringarmani title by Sur Shringar Samsad in 2001. She is empanelled as an Established artiste with the I.C.C.R. Indian Council for Cultural Relations, Ministry of External Affairs and is an A grade artiste of the All India Radio and Doordarshan.

== Education ==
Besides dance, Arunima has also done good in academics. She earned a Bachelor of Arts degree in Economics from India's prestigious St. Stephen's College and then studied M.Sc. in Finance and Accounting from the London School of Economics.

She is also a pistol shooter and has won several medals in State and National Championships and is also the recipient of the Government of India Sports Talent Search Scholarship (1991–1992).

== Film, television and radio broadcasts and appearances ==
She is keenly interested in dramatics and has acted in a number radio and television programs Yog Yatra on Star News, music videos Euphoria, advertisements and short films Documentary on New Delhi, International film, Microsoft, Globus. She has recently done a cameo in a feature film directed by Prakash Jha – Rajneeti.

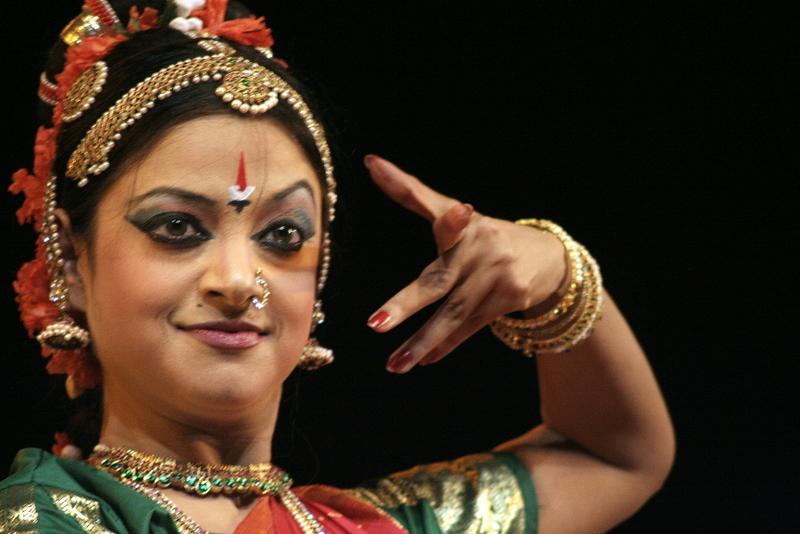
Arunima Kumar performing in Delhi

== Key achievements and work ==
- Ustad Bismillah Khan Yuva Puraskar conferred by Sangeet Natak Akademi, 2009
- Sahitya Kala Parishad Scholarship for Dance in 1998.
- Shringarmani title by Sur Shringar Sansa, 2004.
- She was invited to perform for the Hon'ble President of India at Rashtrapati Bhawan in June, 2006.
- Established Category Artist by the ICCR
- A grade artiste' of the All India Radio and Doordarshan
- Performed with over 400 dancers to break the Guinness book of World Records in Cupertino, California, 2008
- New Choreography – with Fusion band ADVAITA
- Outstanding reviews and dynamic profile have been featured in all leading television and radio channels (Doordarshan, Sony, Aaj Tak, Star News etc.) and newspapers including Hindustan Times, Times of India, Indian Express, Business Standard, India Today etc.,
- She features in the London School of Economics Newsletter for her outstanding performance at the Nehru Centre at London
- In an endeavor to share the joy of being closely involved with India's rich cultural heritage, she also worked for SPICMACAY, a voluntary cultural organisation as its Planning and Finance coordinator.
- She is building her own arts foundation to promote arts amongst youth, conceptualize and implement projects in the field of outreach – ARTS EXTEND - to promote peace and harmony across small towns and villages.
- She was also a speaker at Bridge India's webinar "Cultural diffusion across closed borders: India's Cultural Diplomacy in a lockdown" on Wednesday 1 July.

Kumar was awarded the British Empire Medal (BEM) in 2025 for services to Indian classical dance and community.

== Notable international performances ==
- Indian Cultural Center, Kuala Lumpur, Malaysia, February 2010
- KL Convention Center, Kuala Lumpur, Malaysia, February 2010

== Recent performances in Europe ==
- Nehru Centre, London, July 2009
- Royal Opera House, London, July 2009 part of Akademi's Frame by Frame Seminar
- Dance India at Lowry, Salford, August 2009
- India Centre, Cardiff, August 2009
- Purcell Room, Southbank Center, 'Daredevas', November 2009

Upcoming performances in UK-

- Arena Theatre, Wolverhampton, UK, March 2010
- University of Manchester, March 2010
- Expo 1998, Lisbon, Portugal
- India's 50th year of Independence held in Bonn, Germany
- Expo 2000, Hannover, Germany
- ICCR tour in 2003, Ministry of External Affairs of India, in prestigious venues in Australia, including Canberra Festival, Sydney Opera House, Melbourne, Brisbane.
- ICCR tour Fiji, 2003
- Arts Festival Thailand, ICCR tour 2003
- Arts Festival Malaysia, ICCR tour 2003
- International Festival, Indonesia, 2004
- Asian Arts Festival, Manila, Philippines, 2007
- India Week Celebrations at Nuremberg and Frankfurt, 2005
- Tagore International Centre in Berlin in 2005
- Nehru Centre in London, 2001, 2005
- International Kuchipudi Dance Convention in Cupertino, California in 2008.
- Diwali Celebrations in London, Trafalgar Square from TAL dance group Southern Spice 2016
- Bloomsbury Festival, London 2016

== Notable performances in India ==
- Amrapali ballet, 1987
- Rangapravesham at the Triveni Kala Sangam, New Delhi, 1998
- Hyderabad Arts Festival
- India Habitat Centre, 1998, 1999, 2003
- India International Trade Fair 1999, 2002, 2003, 2006
- SOPAN festival by Sahitya Kala Parishad
- Delhi Tourism Festival at Santushti 2003
- Bharat Yatra Festival in lucknow 2001
- Shringaramani Festival in Mumbai 2001
- Kuchipudi dance festival in Kuchipudi Village
- National Choreography Festival at Habitat Centre 2003
- Qutab Festival in 2003
- Young Dancers Festival at Kolkata sponsored by Sangeet Natak Academy in 2004
- Legends of India Festival at Kamani Auditorium, Delhi, 2004
- Kalidasa Festival at Nagpur in 2004
- India International Center, 2004
- Habitat World in September 2005
- Virasat Festival at Dehradun in 2005
- The Mardol Classical Dance Festival at Goa, 2006
- Goa International Centre in 2006
- Biotech Conference in Hyderabad in 2006
- Nehru Centre in Mumbai in 2006
- Pratishtitha Festival where she played the role of Chitrangada in 'Chitrangada' Ballet, Habitat Center, 2006
- Ugaadi (AP Bhawan) Celebrations in 2006
- Jhansi Mahostav in 2006
- Chamba festival in 2006
- Mammalapuram festival in Chennai in 2007
- Jugalbandi with Kathak, choreographed by Pdt. Birju Maharaj at Holi Ke Rang Mahotsav (sponsored by Kalashram) at Habitat Centre in March, 2007
- Budh Mahotsav in Patna, May 2007 (where she performed the dance ballet Vasavadatta on Rabindra Sangeet Choreographed by her gurus)
- Jaya Samiti in Mumbai in June 2007 organised by Hema Malini
- Radha Asthami in Barsana, September 2007
- Indo-European Conference organized by ICCR, September 2007
- Fusion concert with Rock Band Advaita, September 2007
- Sahitya Kala Parishad young dancer's Festival, September 2007
- Neemrana Fort Palace in Oct 2007
- SAARC Band festival November 2007
- JNU Delhi November 2007, 2008
- Delhi International Arts Festival December 2007
- HCL concert series, December 2007
- Haridas Sammelan, Mumbai, December 2007
- Legends of India Festival at Nehru Center, Mumbai, 2007
- Brahma Gana Sabha in Chennai January 2008
- Nungambakkam Cultural Academy in Chennai, January 2008
- Bhavbhuti Festival - Gwalior, February 2008
- Ustad Allauddin Khan Samaoroh – Mahiyar, Gwalior, February 2008
- Nal Damyanti Ballet at Akhil Bhartiya Mahakavi Shri Harsh Samaroh, Varanasi, March 2008
- India International Trade Fair (Shakuntalam Theatre) on 20 November 2008
- State Day Celebrations at Andhra Bhawan, November, 2008
- Pune Air Force Station, Officer's Mess, Lohegaon, Pune on 14 January 2009
- World Dance Day Celebrations, Habitat Center, May, 2009
- World Dance Day celebrations, India International Center, sponsored by Natya Vriksha, May 2009
- Ustad Bismillah Khan Yuva Puraskaar Samaroh, Sangeet Natak Academy, Delhi, September 2009
- Durga Puja Celebrations, Delhi, September 2009
- Khajuraho Dance Festival February 2010
