= Peter Howell =

Peter Howell may refer to:

- Peter Howell (musician) (born 1949), musician and composer
- Peter Howell (actor) (1919–2015), British actor
- Peter Howell (historian) (1941–2026), British academic and historian
- Peter Howell (psychologist), Professor of Experimental Psychology at University College London

== See also ==
- Peter Howells (disambiguation)
