= Globus (clothing retailer) =

Indian clothing store chain

Globus Stores Private Limited
- Type: Private
- Industry: Retail Industry, Fashion industry
- Founded: 1998
- Headquarters: Mumbai, India
- Area served: India
- Key people: Akshay Raheja (Vice Chairman); Vinay Nadkarni (MD and CEO)
- Products: Discount department store, clothing, Fashion accessory, Apparel
- Owner: Rajan Raheja Group
- Website: https://globusfashion.com/

Globus Stores Private Limited is a retail clothing store chain, based in Mumbai, India. It is part of the Rajan Raheja Group. As of June 2021, the chain has more than 35 locations in 22 cities in India. It currently ranks among the Myntra top 20 brands and Nykaa top 10.

== History ==
Globus was founded in January 1998. Its first location (at a 35,000 square foot store) opened in Indore in June 1999, followed by two locations in Chennai. Its Mumbai flagship location opened in November 2001. By May 2008, the chain had expanded to 24 stores and started a push to greatly expand the number of locations. The chain has previously announced bold plans to expand to a much larger number of stores, such as 150.

The chain was run by Ved Prakash Arya from its founding until March 2004.

Currently, it is run by Vinay Gajanan Nadkarni, who serves as the Managing Director and CEO. Nadkarni, who took over from Arya in 2004, opened the 36th store in February 2013.

Kareena Kapoor became the brand ambassador in 2008 and planned to launch her clothing line with the store.

In 2007, Globus created the world's largest Christmas stocking, which was 111 feet tall. it has chains in Kanpur, Pune, Lucknow, Mumbai, etc.

In 2016, Globus reported a loss of Rs. 24 crore. During the same year, the company closed two underperforming stores, reducing its total to 35 locations.
