= Bristol Law School =

Law school in the University of the West of England

Coordinates: 51.50021°N 2.54749°W

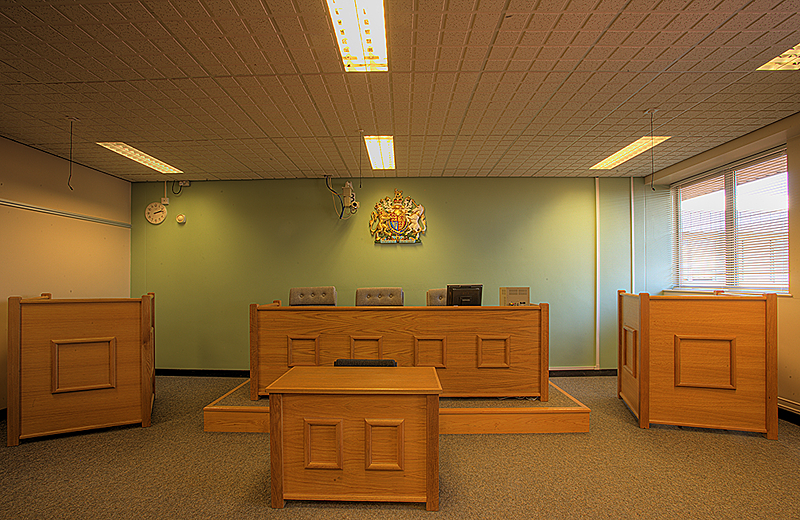
- Type: Public
- Established: 1969
- Administrative staff: 59
- Students: 2,000 (in Bristol); 1700 FT; 300 PT
- Location: Bristol, South Gloucestershire, UK
- Campus: urban
- Website: Official website

Bristol Law School (BLS), formerly known as the Faculty of Law, is an academic school at the University of the West of England. This is different from the University of Bristol Law School.

Bristol Law School is one of the largest law schools in England and Wales with nearly two thousand students enrolled with seventeen hundred being enrolled full-time. The School provides both academic and professional legal studies.

The department is also associated with UWE Law Society, which is part of The Students' Union at UWE.

== Department of Law ==
The Department's internal competition, sponsored by Lyons Davidson, takes place each academic year from October. The inter-varsity West of England Mooting Competition, is sponsored by St John's Chambers, Bristol. Law school students won the Princess Alexandra Cup (an inter-varsity debating competition at Lancaster University) in December 2006, and UWE undergraduate students won the 2013 International Springboard-Kaplan English Speaking Championship, held in Cambodia.

== UWE Law Society ==
UWE Law Society was formed in 2013. The Society has run a variety of events such as informative guest speakers and panels, essential networking events, internal competitions, and educational trips.

== UWE Bristol Law Court Clinic ==
Bristol Law School is a partner in a pro bono law clinic, the UWE Bristol Law Court Clinic. The Clinic is a collaboration between the law students of Bristol Law School, the Department of Law at the University of Bristol, Bristol Citizens Advice Bureau and practising barristers on the Western Circuit.

Bristol Law School's Domestic Advice and Support Service was named Winner - Best New Student Pro Bono Activity in the LawWorks and Attorney - General Student Awards 2011, and the pro bono team was a runner-up in Pro Bono team of the year in The Lawyer Awards 2011.
