= Peter Howells (economist) =

Professor Emeritus

Peter Howells is Professor Emeritus of Monetary Economics at the Bristol Business school at the University of the West of England.

== Education ==
Howells was born in Cardiff (Wales) in 1947, but grew up in Warwick and attended Leamington College from 1959 to 1966. He took his first degree (BA) at the University of Kent at Canterbury, graduating in 1966. Howells then studied (part-time) for his PhD at the London School of Economics from 1970 to 1976 working at the boundaries of economics, history and philosophy. The title of his thesis was 'Economic Theory in Historical Explanation'.

== Learning / teaching interests ==
Howells began his teaching career in 1969 at the North East London Polytechnic and stayed until 2003, by which time the institution had evolved into the University of East London. His initial interests were in 20th Century Economic History, but force of circumstance, and an interest in the work of Keynes, persuaded him to take up macro economics and then monetary economics. In his final years at UEL, Howells held the post of Professor of Economics and was teaching U/G Macroeconomics and U/G and P/G courses in Monetary Economics. His approach to monetary economics was colored by the belief that monetary developments (particularly in the policy area) are difficult to understand without an appreciation of how financial markets work. This theme has recurred throughout a number of his textbooks and other publications.

In 2003 Howells moved to the University of the West of England, firstly as Reader in Economics and then as Professor of Monetary Economics. At UWE he taught: U/G level 2: Macroeconomics; Economics of Money and Banking P/G: Principles and Practice of Banking; Monetary Economics; Financial Economics; and was a founding member of the University's Centre for Global Finance. While at UEL and UWE, Howells supervised more than a dozen PhDs to completion. After several earlier attempts, he finally retired from teaching in 2013, but retains contacts at UWE as Professor Emeritus in Monetary Economics.

== Research / consultancy interests ==
Howells' earliest publications were inspired by the debate over the role of monetary aggregates, where he supported the Post-Keynesian view that the money supply was endogenously created by the demand for credit. However, he disagreed with the more extreme position espoused by Basil Moore and others who said that because the demand for credit was determined by nominal output ('the state of trade') the money supply was an entirely passive variable whose trajectory had little causal relevance to output and/or the price level.

The problem for Howells was that the demand for credit depended on many factors other than the state of trade since borrowing was undertaken to finance all kinds of expenditures, many of them well remote from production. (The demand for mortgages to finance an increasingly speculative housing market in the UK was a good example). Furthermore, since we can show that total transactions are a large and unstable multiple of GDP, we must expect large fluctuations in monetary growth, independent of the path of GDP. The distinction between GDP and total transactions, generally overlooked in modern macroeconomics, has its roots in Irving Fisher and J M Keynes.

More recently publications have focused on aspects of monetary policy design, expressing rather sceptical views about the importance of central bank independence and the transparency of policy-making.

Howellshas held external examiner positions at a number of UK universities and was a Consultant at the Open University 2009–12 advising on the development of courses in personal finance and macroeconomics.

== External roles ==
- Editor, Royal Economic Society Newsletter
- Production Editor, Economic Issues

== Publications (selected) ==
- Biefang-Frisancho Mariscal, I, Howells, P 2007 'Monetary Policy Transparency: Lessons from Germany and the Eurozone', in Germany's Economic Performance, J Hoelscher (eds) Palgrave
- Arestis, P, Howells, P 2001 'The 1520–1640 "Great Inflation": an early case of controversy in money', Journal of Post Keynesian Economics Vol 24 No 2, pp. 181–203
- Howells, P and Bain, K 2008 Economics of Money, Banking and Finance: A European Text, 4th ed., FT-Prentice Hall
- Howells, P and Bain, K 2007 Financial Markets and Institutions, 5th ed., FT-Prentice Hall
- Biefang-Frisancho Mariscal, I, Howells, P 2002 'Central Banks and Market Interest Rates', Journal of Post Keynesian Economics, Vol 24 No 4, pp. 569–585
- Howells, P 2009 'Money and Banking in a Realistic Macro-Model’ in Macroeconomic Theory and Macroeconomic Pedagogy, (eds) Palgrave-Macmillan 169–187
- Howells, P, Biefang-Frisancho Mariscal, I 2010 'Central bank communication, transparency and interest rate volatility: Evidence from the USA', in Macroeconomics, finance and money: Essays in Honour of Philip Arestis, (eds) Palgrave-Macmillan
- Howells, P, Caporale, G, Soliman, A 2004 'Stock Market Development and Economic Growth: The Causal Linkage', Journal of Economic Development, Vol 29 No 1, pp. 33–50
- Howells, P, Soliman, A, Caporate, G 2005 'Endogenous Growth Models and Stock Market Development: Evidence from Four Countries', Review of Development Economics, Vol 9 No 2, pp. 166–176
- Howells, P 2007 ‘What is Endogenous when Monetary Policy is Transparent?’ in Aspects of Modern Monetary and Macroeconomic Policies, P Arestis, E Hein and E Le Heron (eds) Palgrave 27–42
- Howells, P, Biefang-Frisancho Mariscal, I 2006 'Monetary Policy Regimes: a fragile consensus', International Journal of Political Economy, 35 (1), pp. 62–83
- Bain, K and Howells P 2009 Monetary Economics: Policy and its Theoretical Basis, 2nd ed., Palgrave-Macmillan
