= University of the West of England =

University in South Gloucestershire, England

- Coat of arms
- Other names: UWE Bristol, UWE
- Motto: Light Liberty Learning.
- Type: Public research university
- Established: 1856 – Bristol Trade and Mining School; 1894 – Merchant Venturers Technical College; 1970 – Bristol Polytechnic; 1992 – University Status
- Affiliations: ACU; AMBA; Bristol Old Vic Theatre School; EUA; University Alliance; Universities UK
- Endowment: £2.3 million (2018)
- Budget: £379 million (2019/20)
- Chancellor: Sir Peter Bazalgette
- Vice-Chancellor: Sir Steven West
- Academic staff: 2,285 (2024/25)
- Administrative staff: 2,035 (2024/25)
- Students: 36,380 (2024/25); 29,410 FTE (2024/25)
- Undergraduates: 25,070 (2024/25)
- Postgraduates: 11,310 (2024/25)
- Location: Bristol, England, UK; 51.50021°N 2.54749°W
- Campus: Frenchay Campus, City Campus, Glenside Campus
- Colours
- Website: uwe.ac.uk

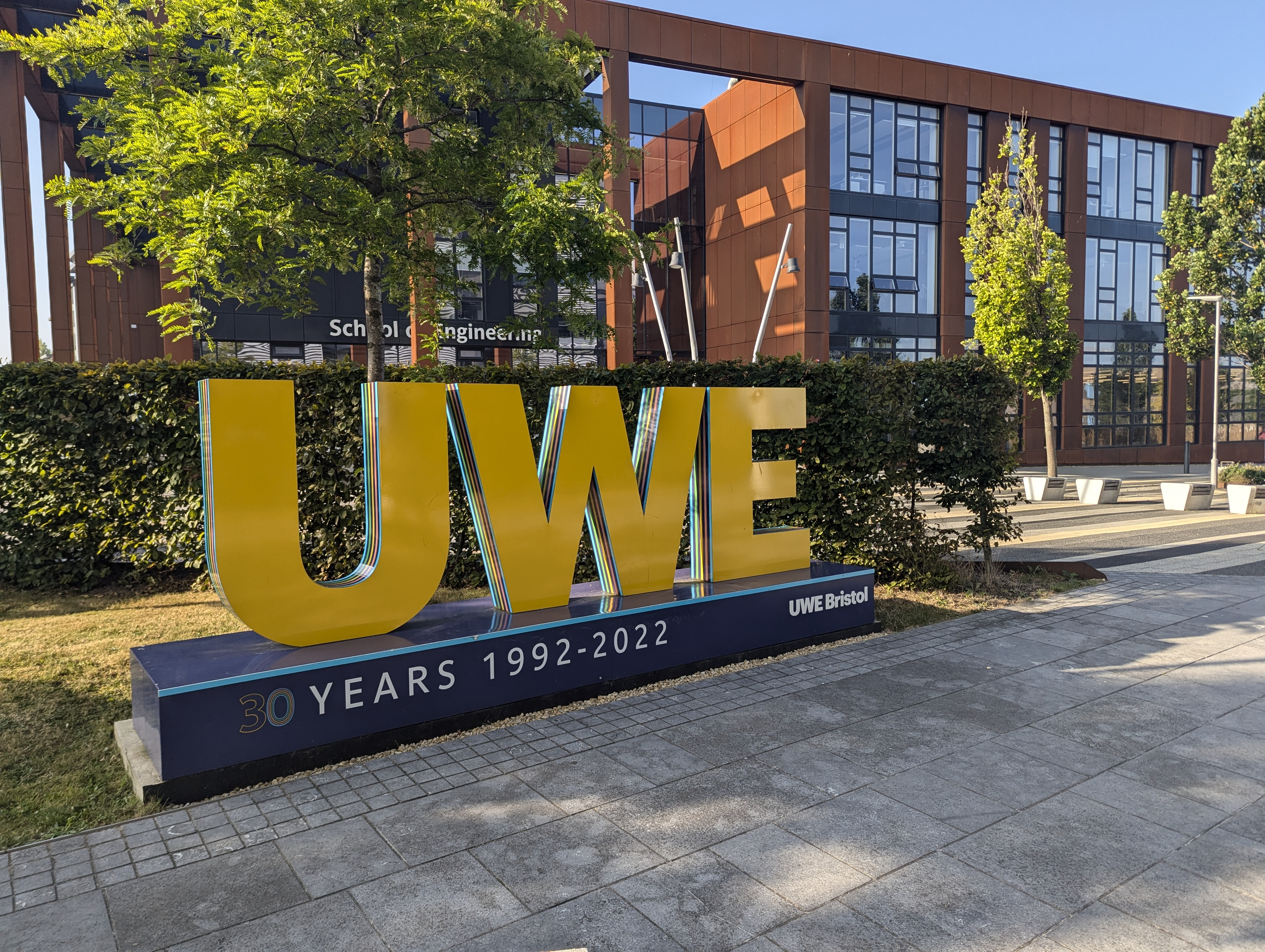
UWE celebrates 30 years

The University of the West of England (UWE), also known as UWE Bristol, is a public research university, located in and around Bristol, England. With over 37,000 students and 4,200 staff, it is the largest provider of higher education in the South West of England.

The institution was formed as Bristol Polytechnic in 1970 and received university status in 1992, becaming the University of the West of England, Bristol. In common with the University of Bristol and University of Bath, it can trace its origins to the Merchant Venturers' Technical College, founded as Bristol Trade and Mining School in 1856.

UWE Bristol is made up of several campuses in Greater Bristol. Frenchay Campus is the largest campus in terms of student numbers, as most of its courses are based there. City campus provides courses in the creative and cultural industries, and is made up of Bower Ashton Studios, Arnolfini, Spike Island, and Watershed. The institution is affiliated with the Bristol Old Vic Theatre School and validates its higher education courses. Glenside Campus is home to most of the College of Health, Science and Society.

== History ==
=== Early foundations ===
The Bristol Trade and Mining School was established in 1856. Between 1863 and 1865 this took over the teaching of the Merchant Venturers' navigation school, which had been founded in 1738 and had merged in the mid 18th century with the older Merchant Venturers' writing school for the children of poor sailors, first mentioned in 1595. The navigation school separated from the trade school in 1865 and closed in 1879. The Merchant Ventures subsequently took over the running of the trade school in 1885, renaming it the Merchant Ventures' School.

In 1894, the school adopted the name Merchant Venturers Technical College, reflecting its growth and the advanced work it was carrying out. From 1909, the technical college provided the faculty of engineering for the University of Bristol, while also continuing with secondary and technical education. In 1949, the faculty of engineering was absorbed by the university and the technical college was transferred to the city of Bristol. The college was then split into the Bristol College of Commerce and the Bristol College of Technology. In 1960 the college of technology was split again, forming the Bristol College of Science and Technology (which would become the University of Bath) and Bristol Technical College. A final split in 1970 formed Brunel Technical College (since merged with South Bristol College to form the City of Bristol College) and Bristol Polytechnic.

=== Polytechnic ===
Bristol Polytechnic incorporated the West of England College of Art in 1970. The Frenchay campus opened in 1975. Redland College and St Matthias then joined the polytechnic in 1976.

Oversight of the polytechnic passed to Avon County Council in 1974. In 1989 it became an independent higher education corporation under the Education Reform Act 1988.

=== University status ===
Bristol Polytechnic gained university status and its present name as a result of the Further and Higher Education Act 1992. In 1997, Hartpury College became an associated faculty of the university. The university was a lead academic sponsor of Bristol Technology and Engineering Academy, a new university technical college, until its closure in 2022.

== Campuses ==
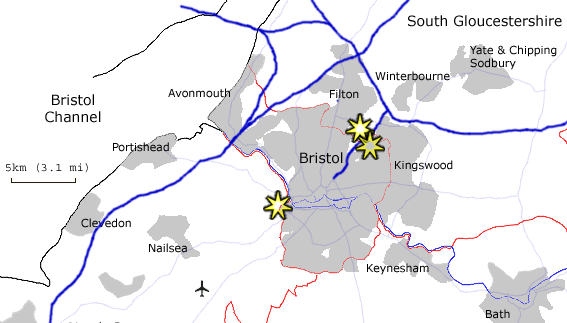
Frenchay (north), Glenside & St Matthias (east) and Bower Ashton (south). Right: Bristol within England.

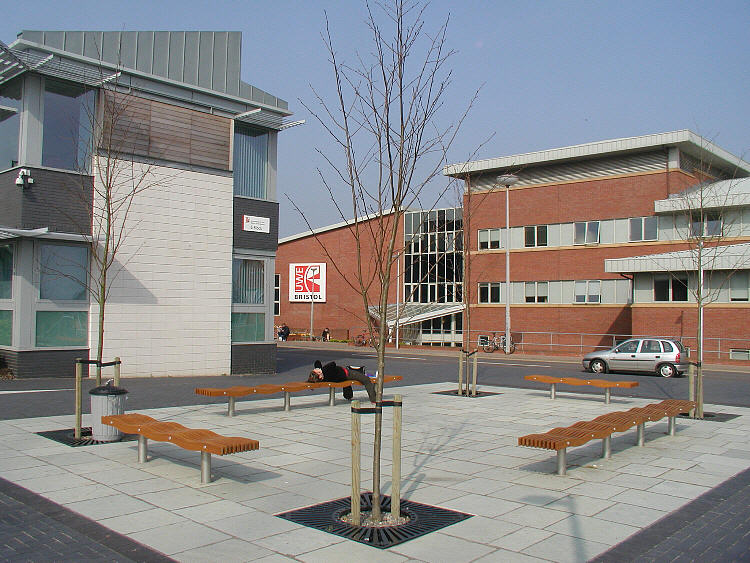
Part of the UWE campus at Frenchay

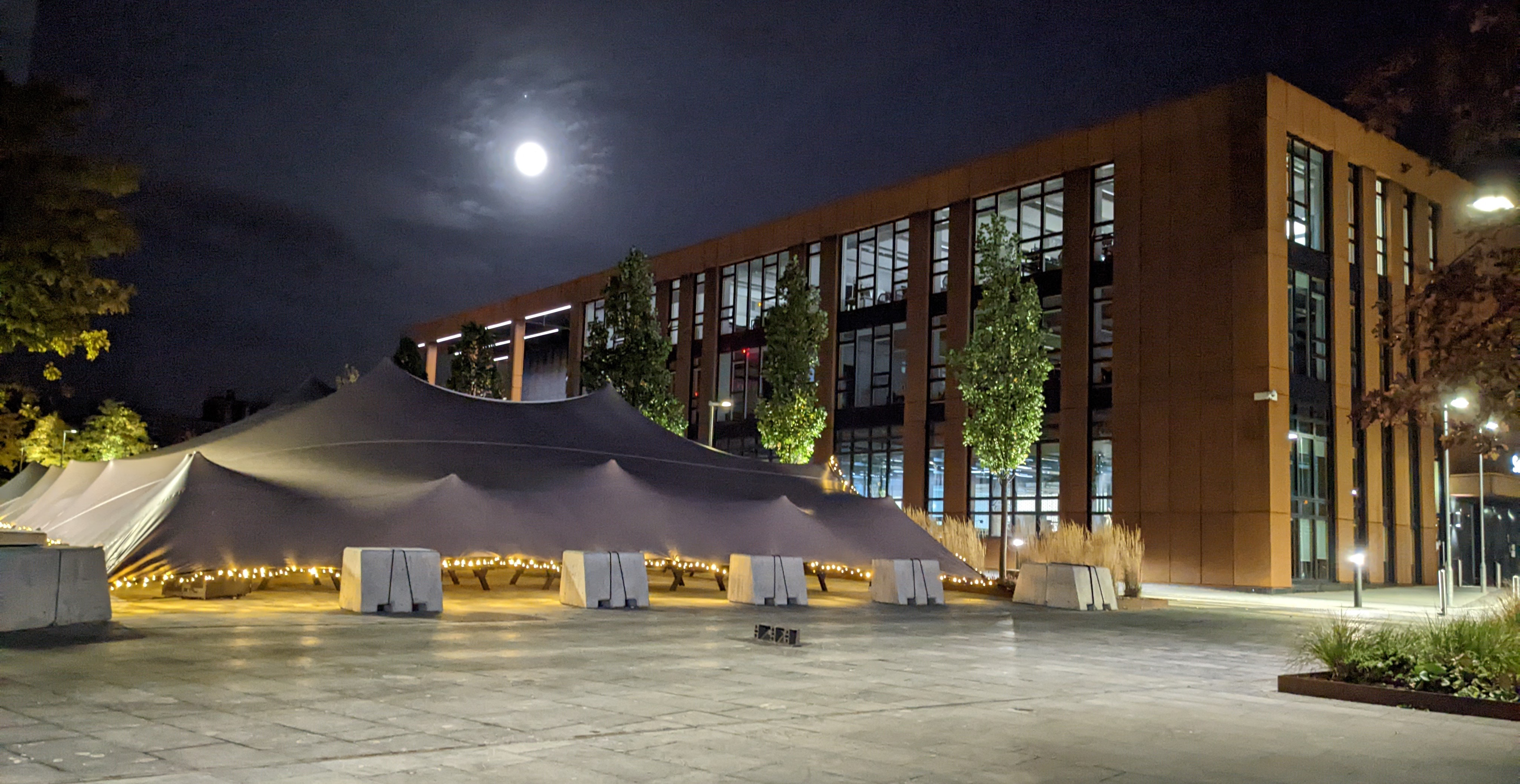
The north side of the new engineering building

=== Frenchay Campus ===
UWE Bristol's largest and primary campus is located 4 miles (6.4 km) north of Bristol city centre in the Stoke Park and Cheswick parish of South Gloucestershire, part of the North Fringe of Bristol. It is named after the village of Frenchay, 1 1/4 miles (2 km) to the east. Filton is to the west and Stoke Gifford to the north.

Frenchay Campus opened in 1975 on 80 acres (32 hectares) of what had been farmland in Stoke Gifford parish. In September 2008, UWE purchased a further 70 acres (28 ha) of adjoining land which had been occupied by Hewlett-Packard, enabling a western expansion of the campus.

The campus is home to:

- Bristol Robotics Laboratory, which opened in 2012.
- UWE Bristol International College, opened in 2012, providing international students with academic, subject-based and English language skills.
- The Students' Union, which moved to two interlinked buildings in 2015, bringing all Students' Union services together.
- Future Space, a business incubator providing space for over 70 hi-tech companies, one of only four university enterprise zones in the UK when it opened in 2016.
- Bristol Business School and Bristol Law School, which moved to the new Business School building completed in 2017.
- The engineering building, a 4-storey building with laboratories, workshops and lecture theatres that cater explicitly to engineering disciplines, which opened 2020.
- The Centre for Sport, which opened in 2006.
- An exhibition and conference centre, opened in former Hewlett-Packard buildings in 2010.

=== City Campus ===
City Campus is made up of Bower Ashton Studios, Spike Island, Arnolfini and Watershed.

==== Bower Ashton Studios ====
Bower Ashton Studios is home to the creative and cultural subjects, which are part of the College of Arts, Technology and Environment. Adjacent to the Ashton Court estate, on the outskirts of the city of Bristol, the West of England College of Art was established in purpose-built premises in 1969, moving from its previous location as the art school of the Royal West of England Academy in Clifton. In 1970 the college became part of Bristol Polytechnic, the precursor of the university.

Every year in June the campus houses a degree show attended by Bristol residents as well as friends and families of the graduating students.

=== Glenside Campus ===
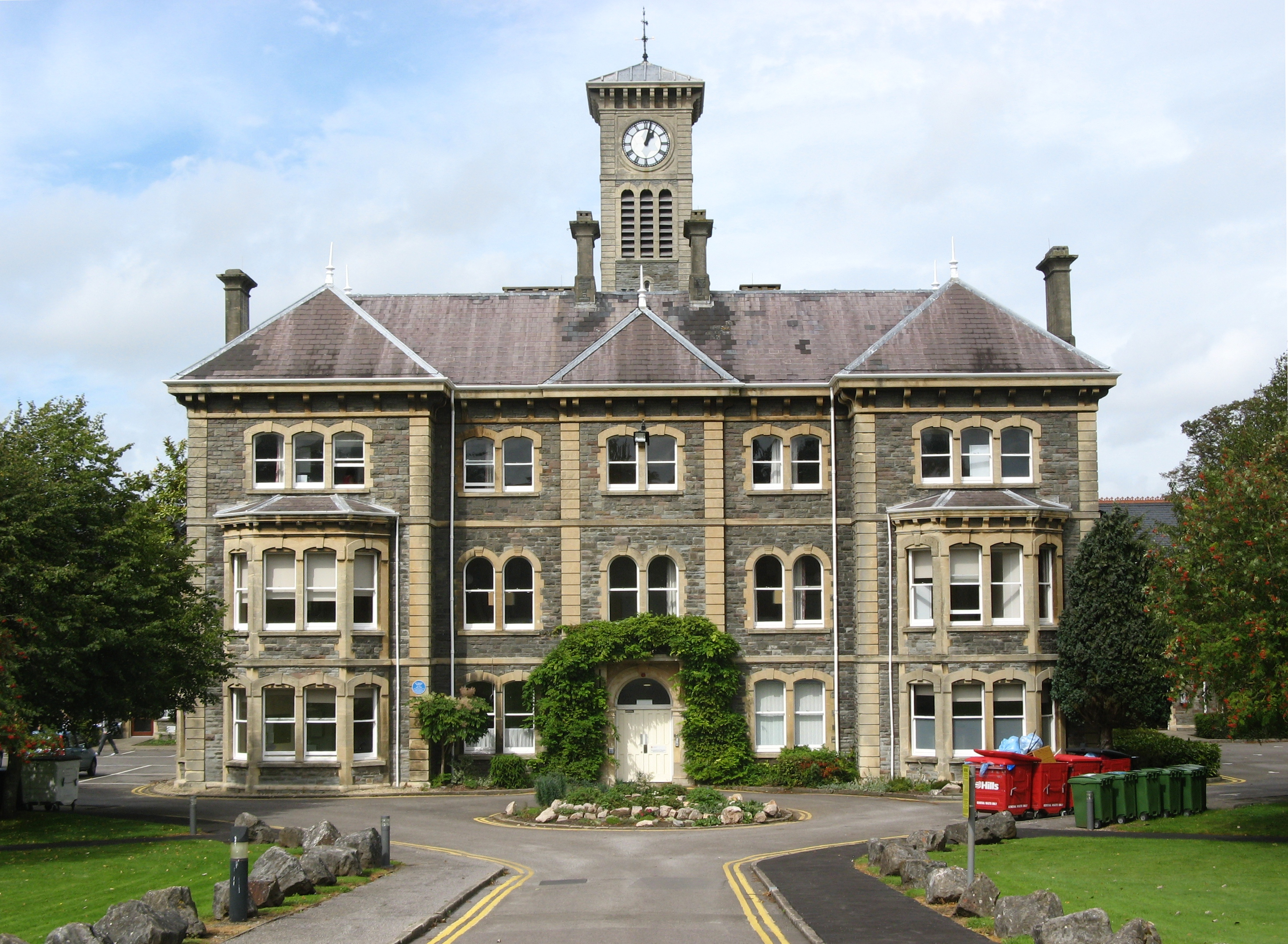
The main building of Glenside Hospital

Glenside Campus is the home of many of the programmes within the College of Health, Science and Society. It is located on Blackberry Hill in the suburb of Fishponds. The College of Health, Science and Society (formerly the Faculty of Health and Applied Sciences) was created in 1996 when the former Avon and Gloucestershire College of Health and Bath and Swindon College of Health Studies joined with the existing Faculty of Health and Community Studies at UWE Bristol. The Glenside Museum is situated within the campus.

It offers full- and part-time courses at all levels in the areas of Midwifery, Nursing, Occupational Therapy, Physiotherapy, Radiography, Social Work and other health-related professions.

=== St Matthias Campus ===
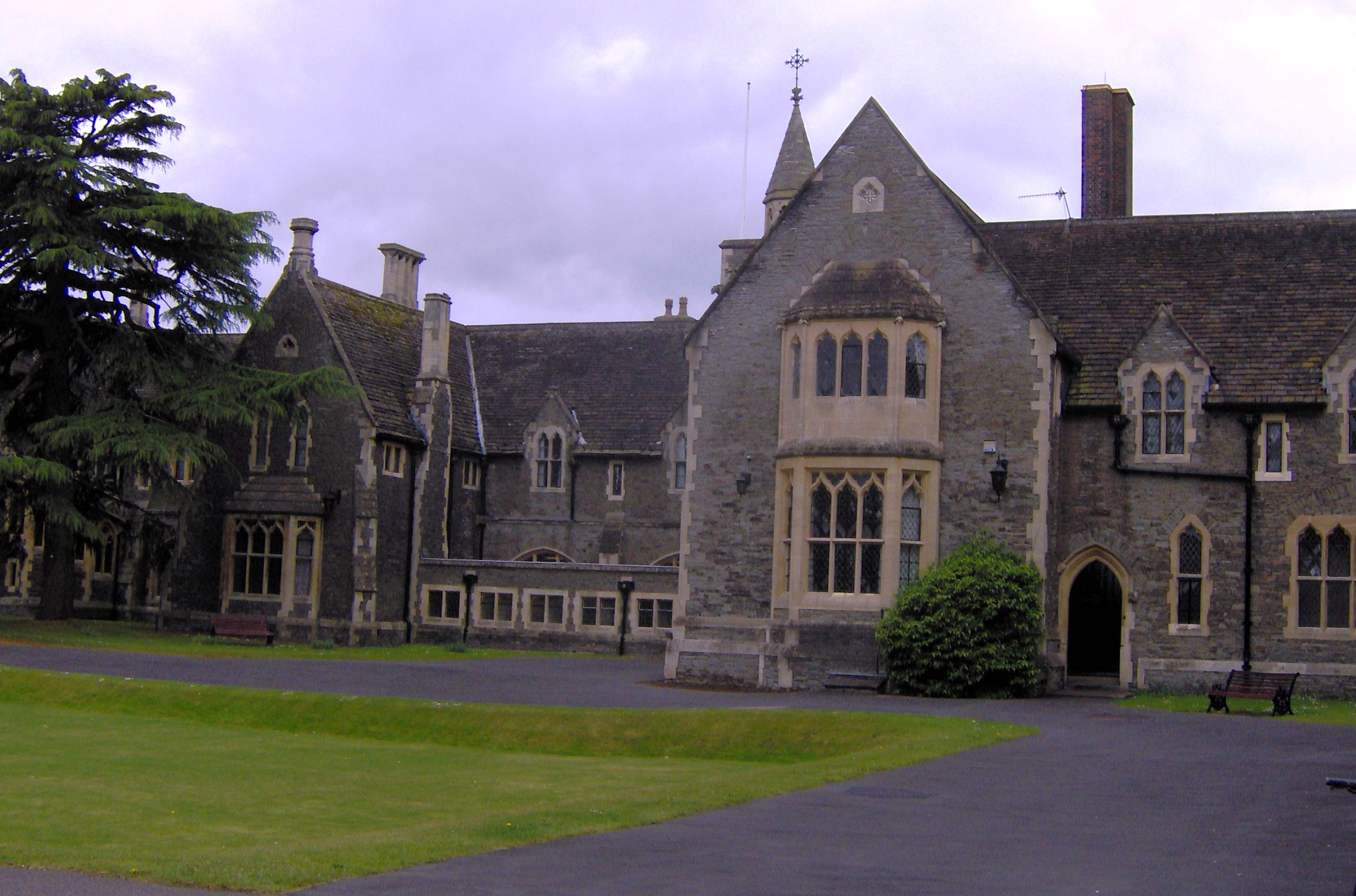
The main building at St Matthias

St Matthias Campus was in Fishponds in Bristol. Built in the Victorian times by the Church of England, the campus has some Victorian Gothic buildings, set around a sunken lawn. St Matthias campus was home to various departments of the faculty of Creative Arts, Humanities and Education. UWE closed the campus in 2014 and the departments moved to new facilities at Frenchay campus. The site has since been redeveloped for housing and the listed buildings converted to a Steiner School.

== Organisation and administration ==
=== Structure ===
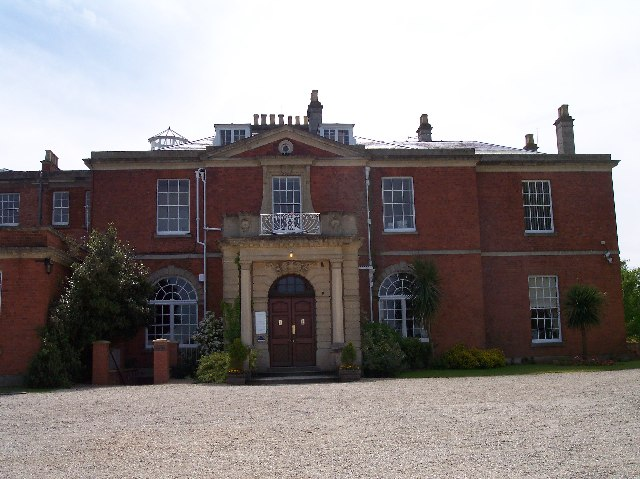
Hartpury College

The university is divided into three colleges which are then subdivided into schools:

- College of Arts, Technology and Environment
  - School of Architecture and Environment
  - School of Computing and Creative Technologies
  - School of Engineering
  - School of Arts
- College of Business and Law
  - Bristol Business School
  - Bristol Law School
- College of Health, Science and Society
  - School of Applied Sciences
  - School of Health and Social Wellbeing
  - School of Social Sciences
  - School of Education and Childhood
- Hartpury College (Associate Faculty)
  - Sport
  - Equine
  - Agriculture
  - Professional
  - Veterinary nursing

=== School of Art and Design ===
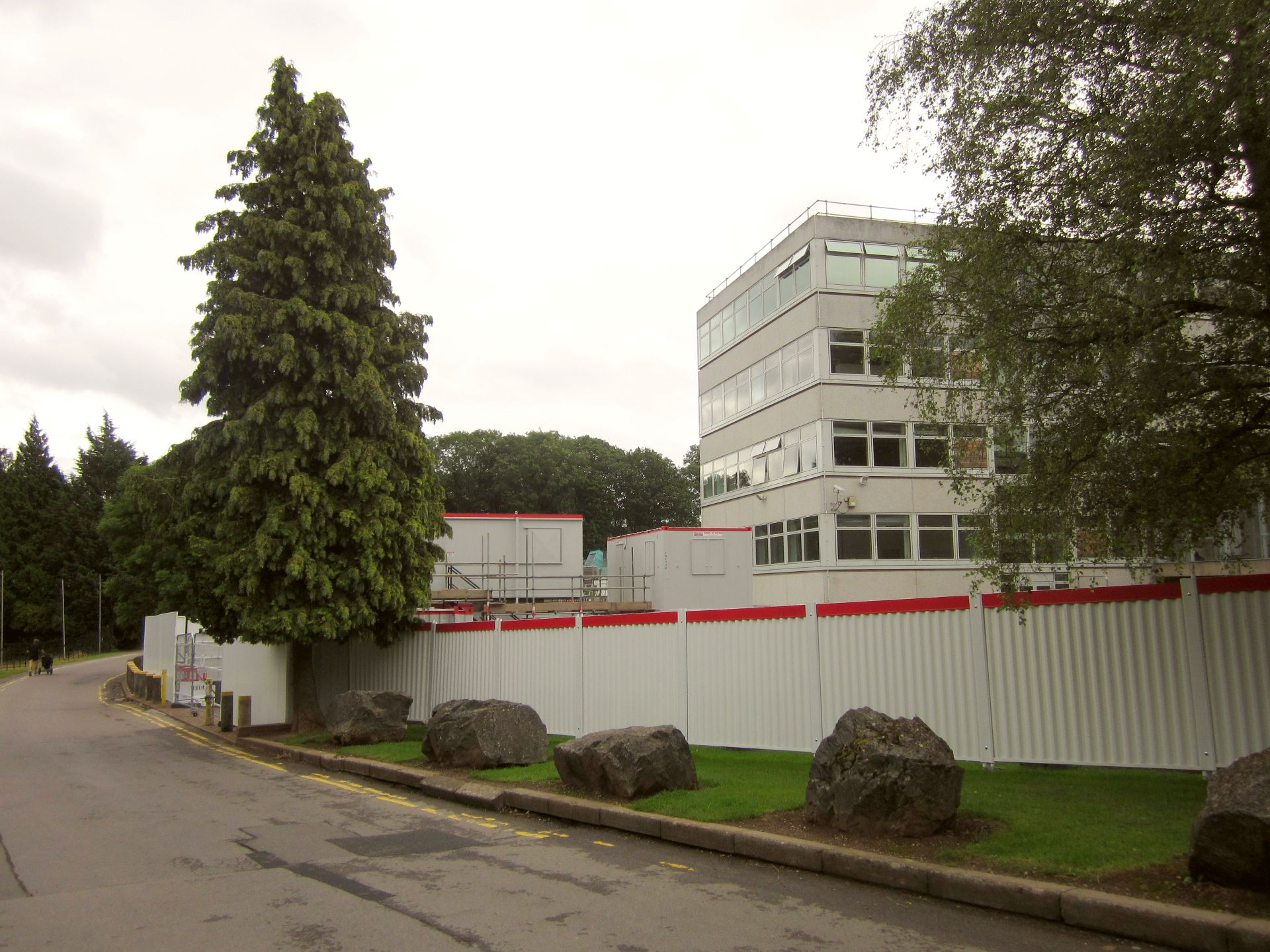
Bower Ashton Studios

The School of Art and Design became part of the Faculty of Arts, Creative Industries and Education (ACE) following the university's reorganisation in 2010/11. Adjacent to the Ashton Court estate in Bower Ashton, the West of England College of Art was established in purpose-built premises in 1969, moving from its previous location as the art school of the Royal West of England Academy in Clifton.

Among its principals and deans were the war artist Jack Bridger Chalker, the graphic designer Paul van Der Lem, designer-bookbinder Jeff Clements MBE, and Paul Gough RWA, a researcher and art historian, who became the first pro-vice chancellor and executive dean of the former faculty in its expanded form of over 2,600 students.

=== Department of Education and Childhood ===
The Department of Education and Childhood (formerly the School of Education) is part of the Faculty of Social Sciences and Humanities. Its origins lie in teacher training colleges at Redland and St Matthias which became part of the former Bristol Polytechnic in 1969. The dean of the school is Ron Ritchie, who is also an assistant vice-chancellor of the university. A new purpose built home for the department was completed in 2000 for the department at the university's Frenchay campus.

The department offers undergraduate degrees in initial teacher education in early years education or primary education, as well as an education studies + PGCE (3+1) programme. Postgraduate Certificate in Education courses are offered as well as a range of professional development courses for teachers, further and higher education teachers and lecturers, and school support staff.

=== Coat of arms ===
Echoing Bristol's long connection with the sea and the Merchant Venturers' Navigation School, the top of the crest depicts a ship's mainmast and rigging. The flaming fire basket indicates guidance, hope and the desire for learning.

The shield at the centre is adapted from that of the College of St Matthias with the wavy line representing the rivers of Avon and Severn. The unicorn is taken from the arms of the City of Bristol and the sea stag from those of the former County of Avon. Both these creatures wear a crown of King Edgar around their necks. Edgar is regarded as a local monarch because he was crowned in Bath Abbey in 973. The wavy lines enclosed in circles on the shoulders represent the fountain of knowledge and learning.

The unicorn and sea stag each support an apple tree, known as the tree of knowledge and is taken from the coat of arms of the Council for National Academic Awards which used to authorise degrees awarded to students of Bristol Polytechnic.

The motto Light, Liberty, Learning is a Disraeli quotation and corresponds directly to the symbolism of the coat of arms. The fire basket represents the Light, the Bristol and Avon supporters represent liberty, and the trees of knowledge and learning.

== Academic profile ==
=== Rankings and reputation ===
Rankings
National rankings
- Complete (2027): 74
- Guardian (2027): 45
- Times / Sunday Times (2027): 65

Global rankings
- QS (2027): 761–770
- THE (2026): 601–800

UCAS Admission Statistics
	2018	2017	2016	2015	2014	2013
Applications	31,765	30,425	27,710	28,615	29,015	30,390
Offer Rate (%)	73.3	69.3	61.2	63.0	63.4	62.8
Enrols	6,140	5,855	5,340	5,375	5,645	5,845
Yield (%)	26.4	27.8	31.5	29.8	30.7	30.6
Applicant/Enrolled Ratio	5.17	5.20	5.19	5.32	5.14	5.20
Average Entry Tariff (Note: New UCAS Tariff system from 2016)	122	125	127	322	323	324

UWE Bristol was ranked within the top 25 universities in the UK by The Guardian University Guide 2021. UWE Bristol is only one of four universities in the UK to have a University Enterprise Zone providing space for over 70 businesses, and the largest UK robotics lab.

The 2018 Teaching Excellence Framework, a government assessment of the quality of undergraduate teaching in universities, awarded the university with a Gold rating. In 2017, UWE Bristol was ranked as one of the top 150 universities in the world under 50 in THE Times' ranking. In 2019, it ranked 464th among the universities around the world by SCImago Institutions Rankings.

Ofsted reports have rated UWE Bristol's primary, secondary and further education initial teacher training (ITT) courses as good.

=== Research ===
The volume of world-leading research at UWE Bristol has gone up by 170%, according to the results of the Research Excellence Framework (REF) 2014. The REF 2021 results revealed that 76 percent of the research submitted by UWE Bristol was judged to be either world leading or internationally excellent. The results highlighted strengths in the areas of education, allied health and nursing, and law. Results were also outstanding in areas such as architecture, built environment and planning; social work and social policy; and communication, cultural and media studies.

In 2010, UWE Bristol launched a research repository in order to host electronic versions of the research of its academics. The UWE Bristol Research Repository is open access.

=== Bristol Robotics Laboratory and Future Space ===
Bristol Robotics Laboratory (BRL), the largest robotics laboratory of its type in the UK was officially opened on 10 May 2012 by David Willetts, Minister for Universities and Science. The laboratory is a partnership between University of the West of England (UWE) and the University of Bristol.

According to EE/Times, it is the largest robotics laboratory in Europe. The BRL is home to a community of 70 academics and businesses who are leading current thinking in nouvelle and service robotics, intelligent autonomous systems and bio-engineering. Over £1.65 million has been spent on the new facilities. The total area of the BRL is circa 2,400 m^{2}, with over 300 square metres of specialised laboratory space and two Flying Arenas.

Future Space is a business incubator adjacent to the Bristol Robotics Laboratory, in a former Hewlett-Packard factory building which was bought by UWE Bristol in 2015 and converted. It can house up to 70 hi-tech startup companies and early-stage companies. It is the £16.5 million realisation of the West of England University Enterprise Zone (UEZ), one of four UEZs supported by the UK government, which were initially announced by Chancellor George Osborne in 2014. The main areas of focus of the UEZ are robotics, biotechnology and biomedicine. It is a collaboration with the West of England Local Enterprise Partnership and the University of Bristol, supported by South Gloucestershire Council, the University of Bath and the West of England Academic Health Science Network. Future Space opened in autumn 2016.

=== National College for Legal Training ===
The National College of Legal Training (NCLT) is a collaboration between UWE Bristol and Central Law Training, launched in January 2010 to provide postgraduate legal training. NCLT Study centres are located at Coventry University, Manchester Metropolitan University, Southampton Solent University and University of Westminster.

=== The Bristol Distinguished Address Series ===
Based at the University of the West of England Campus in Frenchay the series of lectures bring business leaders to Bristol. The conference covers a wide range of topics including business, technology & innovation, science and local & global issues.

== Student life ==
=== Students' Union ===
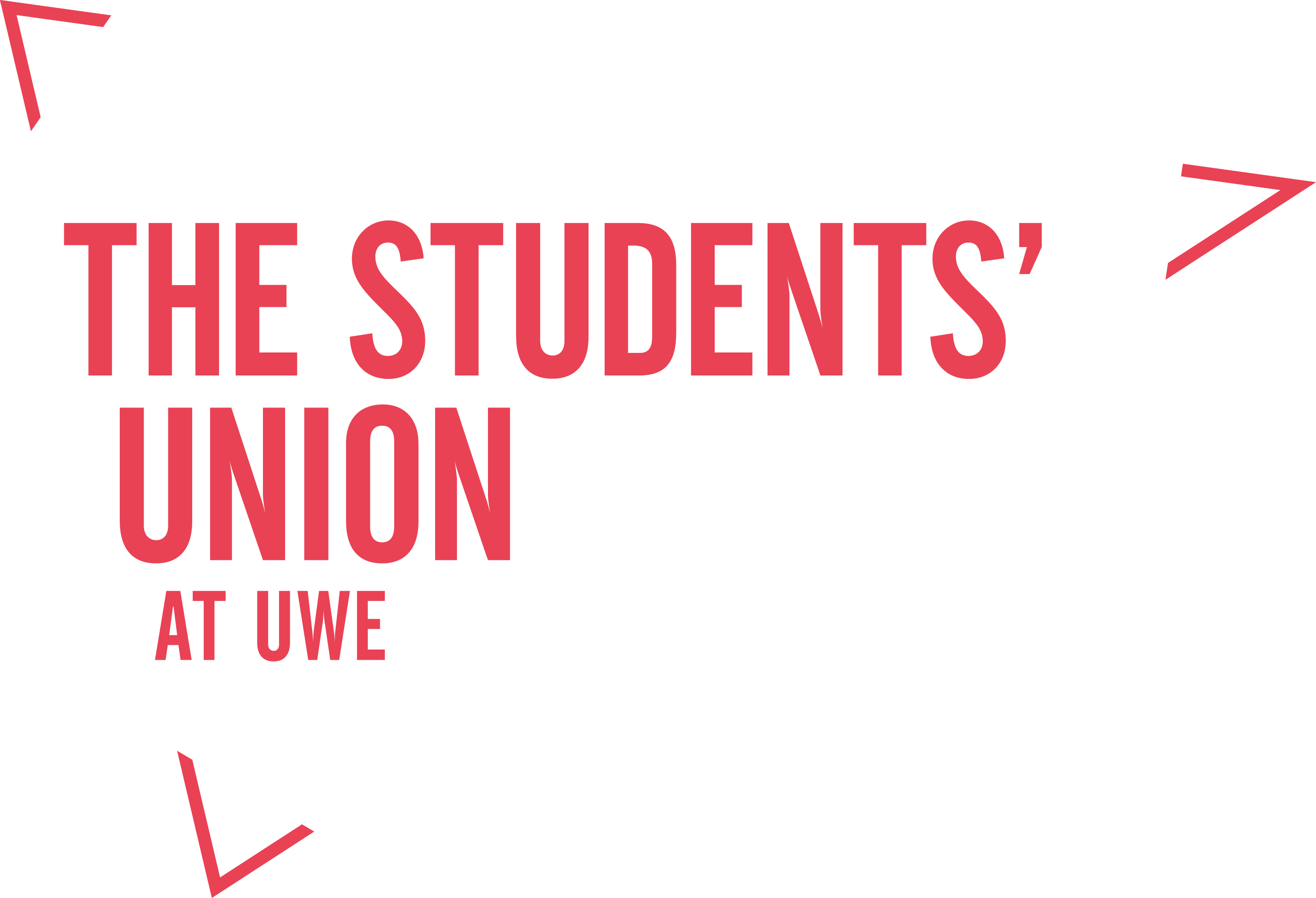
The logo of the University of the West of England - Students' Union at UWE

The Students' Union at UWE, formerly UWE Students' Union ('UWESU'), is based at Frenchay campus and was established in 1971. It is run by a team of five sabbatical officers, who are elected annually from the student population. The new Students' Union building was completed in Summer 2015 and operates a bar, a coffee shop and two convenience stores at Frenchay Campus. A Students' Union bar and shop is also available at Glenside Campus and Bower Ashton Studios. The student radio station, Hub Radio operates out of a studio on campus.

=== Student accommodation ===
In September 2006, Frenchay Student Village opened providing on-campus accommodation for 1,932 students, adding to the 252 units already provided in Carroll Court. Campus accommodation is also provided at Glenside. In partnership with UNITE Student Housing a further 1,500 places are provided in Bristol City Centre and UWE Bristol Accommodation services also places students in vetted private rentals. All accommodation at UWE is self-catering.

In September 2014, Wallscourt Park opened on Frenchay Campus. Following the 2020–21 academic year, Carroll Court was knocked down. Purdown View, completed for full occupation beginning in the 2024-25 academic year, was built in its place; in order to accommodate extra students. It is the largest Passivhaus development in the UK to date, and has won a number of awards.

In September 2023, TV presenter Kirstie Allsopp accused the university of "grossly exploiting" students, after delays to the completion of new accommodation on campus meant that students were being allocated student accommodation in Cheltenham and Gloucester. UWE later confirmed 87 students had started their degree courses in Cheltenham and another 47 in Gloucester, but that it planned to relocate them back to the UWE campus "as soon as it's available". The university had previously been criticised for offering students places at Usk Way student accommodation in Newport, South Wales.

University-managed accommodation:

Frenchay Campus

- Student Village (comprising Brecon Court, Cotswold Court, Mendip Court and Quantock Court)
- Wallscourt Park
- Purdown View

Glenside Campus

- Glenside (on-campus)
- The Hollies (opposite campus)

Bristol City Centre

- Marketgate (owned by Unite Group)
- Nelson and Drake House (owned by Unite Group)
- Blenheim Court (owned by Unite Group)
- Phoenix Court (owned by Unite Group)
- Cherry Court (owned by Unite Group)

Former

- Ashley Village, Frenchay Campus (demolished around 2005 to make way for the S Block)
- Carroll Court, Frenchay Campus (demolished in 2022 to make way for Purdown View)

=== Sport ===
The University of the West of England Boat Club is the rowing club belonging to the university.

The UWE Bullets are the American Football team belonging to the university. The team won the British Universities American Football League championship in 2022, 2023 and 2024.

== Notable alumni ==
- Silas Adekunle – entrepreneur
- Tim Atkins – Scotland hockey player
- Angellica Bell – BBC Politics, TV and radio presenter
- Helen Blaby – BBC radio reporter, newspaper columnist
- Samantha Cameron – business executive, wife of David Cameron
- Simon Carroll – studio potter
- Ian Cognito – comedian
- Paul Coldwell – artist
- David Fisher – artist
- Bear Grylls – English adventurer and TV presenter
- Larry Godfrey – Olympic archer
- Peter J. Hall – costume designer for the Dallas Opera
- Miranda Hart – comedian
- Russell Howard – comedian
- Myles Jackman – lawyer
- David Knopfler, musician and co-founder of the rock band Dire Straits.
- CY Leung – Vice Chairman of the National Committee of the Chinese People's Political Consultative Conference
- Lee Chee Leong – Malaysian Deputy Home Minister
- Lady Davina Lewis – member of British royal family
- Richard Long – sculptor
- Kate Malone – studiopotter
- Jamie Oliver – keyboardist of Welsh rock band Lostprophets
- Darron Pickstock – Bahamian lawyer and Senator
- Dawn Primarolo – Labour Party Member of Parliament
- Pete Reed – Olympic rower
- Seyi Rhodes – television presenter and investigative journalist
- Jack Russell – cricketer
- Christopher Sadler – animator director, who works with Aardman Animations
- Simon Shaw – rugby union England international
- Lyndon Smith – academic
- Hugo Southwell – rugby union Scotland international
- Marko Stanojevic – rugby union Italy international
- Shirley Teed – artist
- Teo Nie Ching – Malaysian Democratic Action Party Member of Parliament
- Dominic Waghorn – U.S. correspondent of Sky News
- Cedric Koukjian – artist

== Notable faculty ==
- Alison Assiter, professor of feminist theory
- Victoria Clarke
- Richard Coates
- Owen Holland
- Aaron Schuman
- Peter Howells
- Stephen J. Hunt
- Julie Kent
- Howard Newby
- Lyndon Smith
- Steven West

== See also ==
- Armorial of British universities
- List of universities in the United Kingdom
- Post-1992 university
