= Bristol Robotics Laboratory =

Coordinates: 51.501°N 2.552°W

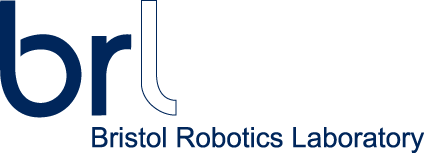

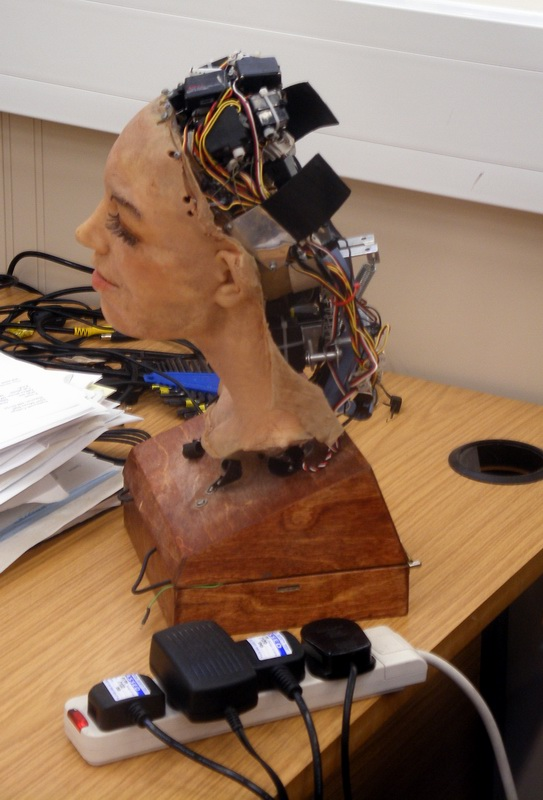
- "Eva", an expressive robot head used for research in human-robot interaction at the BRL
- Established: 2005
- Directors: Arthur Richards and Lars Kunze
- Faculty: School of Engineering, UWE; Faculty of Engineering, Bristol
- Staff: 392
- Location: Bristol, United Kingdom
- Affiliations: University of the West of England; University of Bristol
- Website: http://www.bristolroboticslab.com

The Bristol Robotics Laboratory (BRL), established in 2005, is the largest academic centre for multidisciplinary robotics research in the UK. It is the result of a collaboration between the University of Bristol and the University of the West of England in Bristol and is situated on UWE's Frenchay Campus. An internationally recognised Centre of Excellence in Robotics, the Bristol Robotics Laboratory covers an area of over 4,600 sq. metres (50,000 sq. feet). The laboratory is currently involved in interdisciplinary research projects addressing key areas of robot capabilities and applications, including human-robot interaction, unmanned aerial vehicles, driverless cars, swarm robotics, non-linear control, machine vision, robot ethics and soft robotics. The BRL co-directors are Professors Arthur Richards and Lars Kunze.

== History ==
The BRL evolved out of the Intelligent Autonomous Systems laboratory, established in 1992. The Intelligent Autonomous Systems (IAS) lab was co-founded by Alan Winfield, Chris Melhuish, Owen Holland and Tony Pipe and led by Winfield until 2001, when Melhuish took over as lab director. In 2005, £1M was secured from the HEFCE Research Infrastructure Fund in a joint bid from UWE and the University of Bristol and the IAS lab was renamed and relaunched as the Bristol Robotics Lab. Following relocation to its current premises, the BRL was officially launched by David Willetts in May 2012.

In 2014, BBC News at Six was broadcast live from the BRL. The feature was the third of a three-part series of pre-budget specials fronted by anchor George Alagiah and then Chief Economics Correspondent Hugh Pym.

Chris Melhuish led the BRL as director until 2021.
