= Behind the Sightings =

- Teaser poster
- Directed by: Tony H. Cadwell
- Written by: Norman Alston; Tony H. Cadwell
- Produced by: Tommy Vlahopoulos
- Distributed by: Tommy V Productions
- Release date: July 7, 2021
- Country: United States
- Language: English

Behind the Sightings is a 2021 American psychological thriller horror film directed by Tony H. Cadwell and produced by Tommy Vlahopoulos and Tom Sulkowski. The film, shot in a found-footage style, draws inspiration from the 2016 clown sightings. The film was originally scheduled for a theatrical release in the United States in October 2017, but was delayed due to creative differences over the final cut. It was released on July 7, 2021, on video-on-demand (VOD) platforms.

== Plot ==
A young married couple, Todd and Jessica Smith, two filmmakers from Raleigh, North Carolina, set out to produce a documentary exploring the highly publicized sightings of individuals dressed as evil clowns.

== Production ==
Executive producer Tommy Vlahopoulos stated in March 2017:

Clowns have traditionally been associated with slapstick style performance, comedy or mime, but there has always been a dark side to a clown. This is not fake news. Behind the Sightings is centred around the terrifying clown sightings that shook the world last year, and an eager couple swept up in all the phenomenon. This is a very newsworthy subject, especially with all the continuous clown sightings.

== Release ==
The film was initially set to be released in theatres in October 2017. According to director Cadwell, in reference to the fictional family of the victim in the movie, "one member of the family was not happy with some of the footage we were released in the final cut. According to our agreement with the family, in order for the film to be released, the family has to approve of the film".

Behind the Sightings was released on July 7, 2021, on video-on-demand (VOD) platforms.
