= Evil clown =

Pop culture trope and horror staple

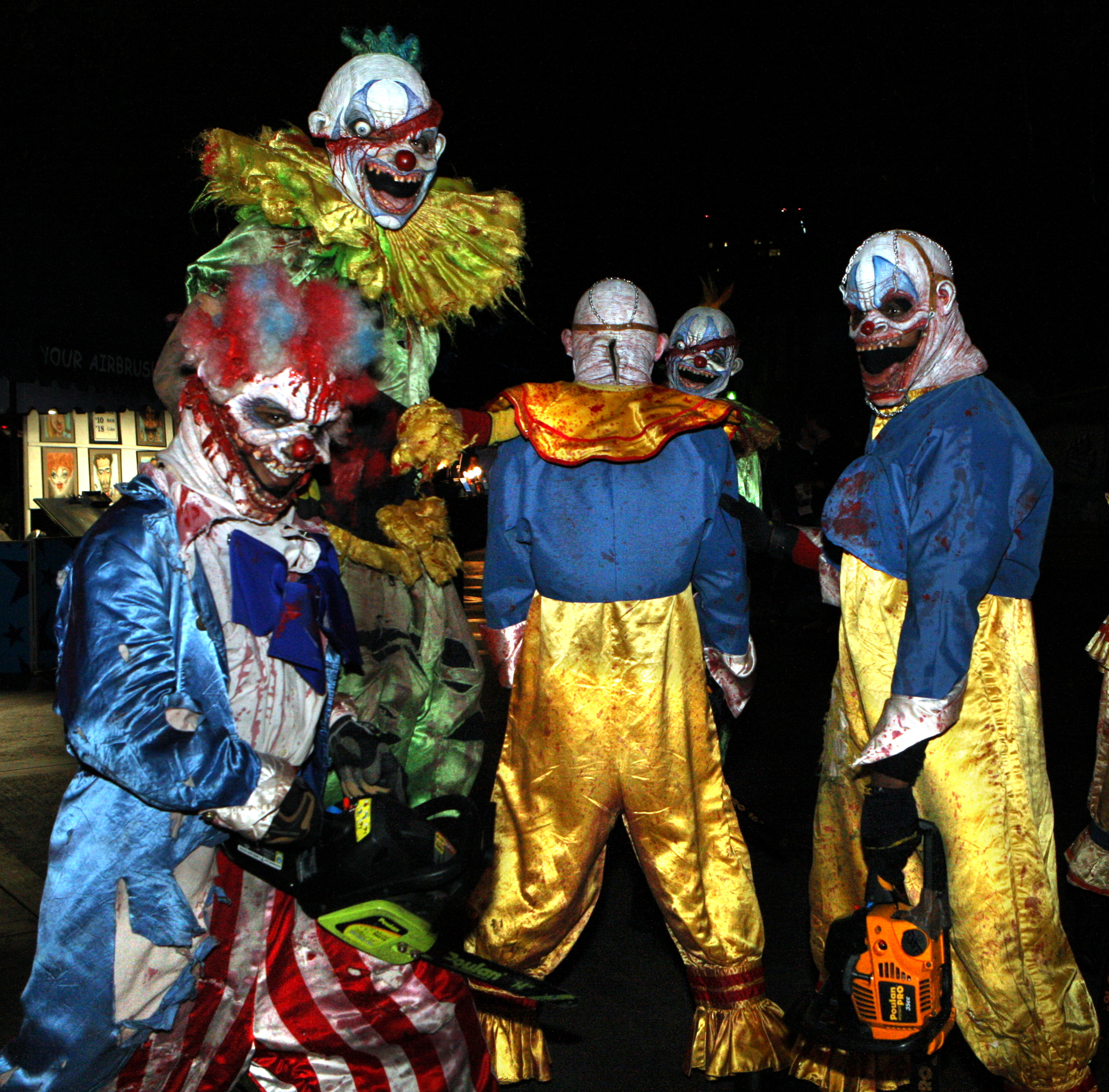
A group of people in evil clown costumes at a PDC 2008 party at Universal Studios

The evil clown (also known as the creepy clown, phantom clown, scary clown, or especially if their character involves terrorizing and murdering people, killer clown) is a subversion of the traditional comic clown character, in which the playful trope is instead depicted in a more disturbing nature through the use of horror elements and dark humor. The modern archetype of the evil clown was popularized by the DC Comics supervillain Joker starting in 1940, and again in the 1980s by Pennywise from Stephen King's It. The character can be seen as playing on the sense of unease felt by sufferers of coulrophobia, the fear of clowns.

== Origins ==
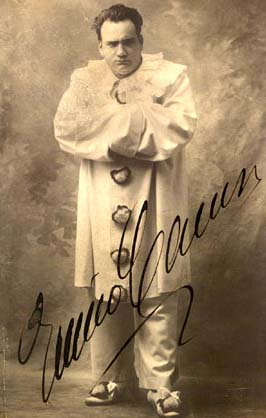
Enrico Caruso as the murderous Canio in Pagliacci

The modern archetype of the evil clown has unclear origins; the stock character appeared infrequently during the 19th century, in such works as Edgar Allan Poe's "Hop-Frog", which is believed by Jack Morgan, of the University of Missouri-Rolla, to draw upon an earlier incident "at a masquerade ball", in the 14th century, during which "the King and his frivolous party, costumed—in highly flammable materials—as simian creatures, were ignited by a flambeau and incinerated, the King narrowly escaping in the actual case." Evil clowns also occupied a small niche in drama, appearing in the 1874 work La femme de Tabarin by Catulle Mendès and in Ruggero Leoncavallo's Pagliacci (accused of being a plagiarism of Mendès' piece), both works featuring murderous clowns as central characters. American serial killer and rapist John Wayne Gacy became known as the Killer Clown when arrested in 1978, after it was discovered he had performed as Pogo the Clown at children's parties and other events; however, Gacy did not actually commit his crimes while wearing his clown costume. During the 1980s, the National Lampoon published a series of mock comic books in the pages of the magazine, entitled "Evil Clown", which featured a malevolent character named Frenchy the Clown.

Evil clown themes were occasionally found in popular music. Zal Cleminson, guitarist with the English rock band The Sensational Alex Harvey Band, wore black and white clown-style makeup and colorful clothes while on stage during the band's 1970s heyday, while his "happy-sad-happy" demeanor helped give their performances an edge of menace.

The evil clown archetype plays strongly off the sense of dislike it caused to inherent elements of coulrophobia; however, it has been suggested by Joseph Durwin that the concept of evil clowns has an independent position in popular culture, arguing that "the concept of evil clowns and the widespread hostility it induces is a cultural phenomenon which transcends just the phobia alone". A study by the University of Sheffield concluded "that clowns are universally disliked by children. Some found them quite frightening and unknowable." This may be because of the nature of clowns' makeup hiding their faces, making them potential threats in disguise; as a psychology professor at California State University, Northridge stated, young children are "very reactive to a familiar body type with an unfamiliar face". This natural dislike of clowns makes them effective in a literary or fictional context, as the antagonistic threat perceived in clowns is desirable in a villainous character.

Researcher Ben Radford, who published Bad Clowns in 2016 and is regarded as an expert on the phenomenon, writes that looking throughout history clowns are seen as tricksters, fools, and more; however, they always are in control, speak their minds, and can get away with doing so. When writing the book Bad Clowns, Radford found that professional clowns are not generally fond of the bad-clown (or evil-clown) persona. They see them as "the rotten apple in the barrel, whose ugly sight and smell casts suspicion on the rest of them," and do not wish to encourage or propagate coulrophobia. Yet, as Radford discovered, bad clowns have existed throughout history: Harlequin, the King's fool, and Mr. Punch. Radford argues that bad clowns have the "ability to change with the times" and that modern bad clowns have evolved into Internet trolls. They may not wear clown costumes but, nevertheless, engage with people for their own amusement, abuse, tease and speak what they think of as the "truth" much like the court jester and "dip clowns" do using "human foibles" against their victims. Radford states that, although bad clowns permeate the media in movies, TV, music, comics, and more, the "good clowns" outnumber the bad ones. Research shows that most people do not fear clowns but actually love them and that bad clowns are "the exception, not the rule."

== Interpretations ==
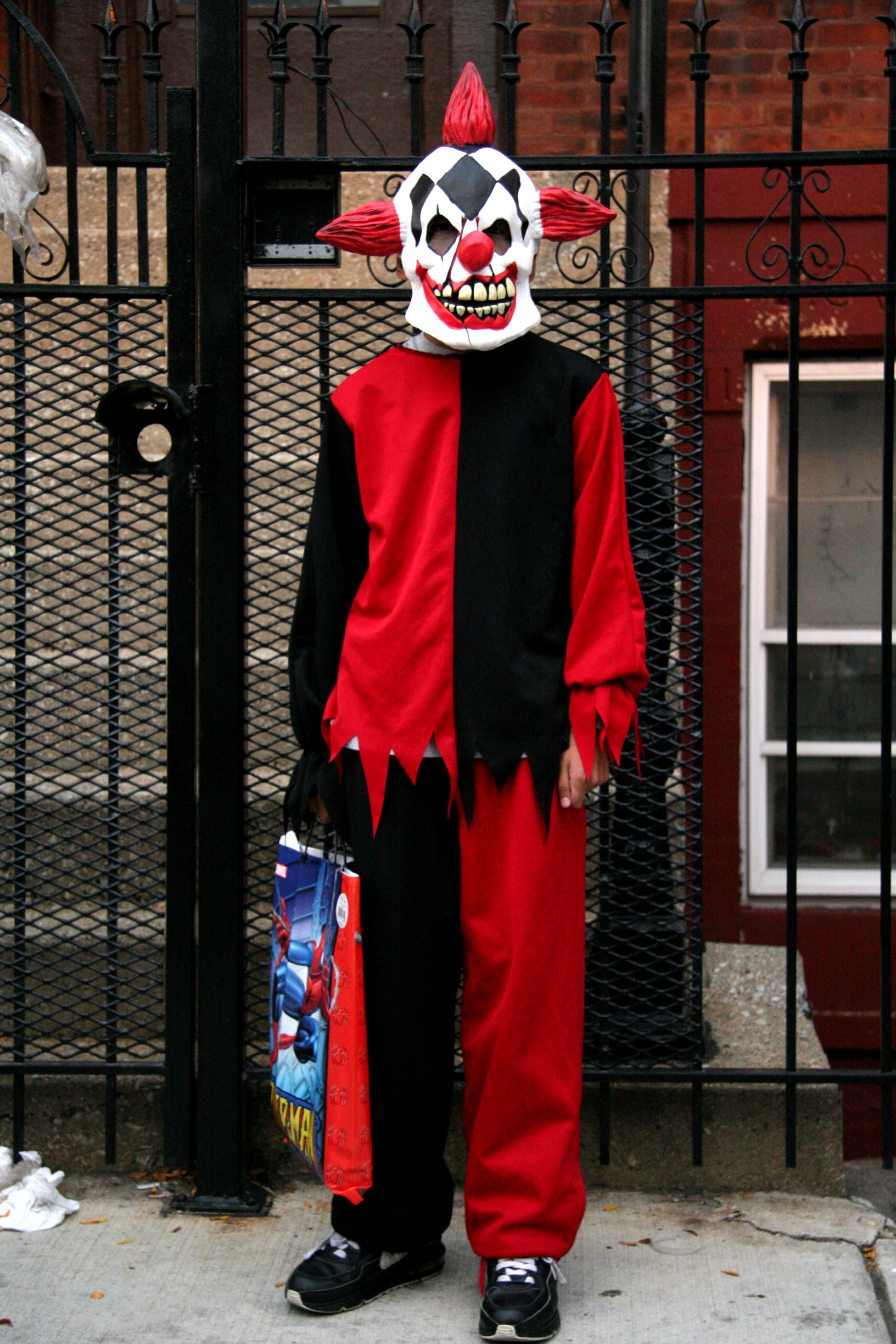
A man in evil clown costume in 2007

The concept of the evil clown is related to the irrational fear of clowns, known as coulrophobia, a neologism coined in the context of informal "-phobia lists".

The cultural critic Mark Dery has theorized the postmodern archetype of the evil clown in "Cotton Candy Autopsy: Deconstructing Psycho-Killer Clowns" (a chapter in his cultural critique The Pyrotechnic Insanitarium: American Culture on the Brink).

Tracking the image of the demented or deviant clown across popular culture, Dery analyzes the "Pogo the Clown" persona of the serial killer John Wayne Gacy; the obscene clowns of the neo-situationist Cacophony Society; the Joker (of Batman fame); the grotesque art of R.K. Sloane; the sick-funny Bobcat Goldthwait comedy Shakes the Clown; Scooby-Doo's Ghost Clown from the episode "Bedlam in the Big Top"; Horny the Clown in the 2007 horror-comedy movie Drive-Thru, and Pennywise from Stephen King's It.

Using Mikhail Bakhtin's theory of the carnivalesque, Jungian and historical writings on the images of the fool in myth and history, and ruminations on the mingling of ecstasy and dread in the Information Age, Dery asserts the evil clown is an icon of our times. Clowns are often depicted as murderous psychopaths at many American haunted houses.

Wolfgang M. Zucker points out the similarities between a clown's appearance and the cultural depictions of demons and other infernal creatures, noting "[the clown's] chalk-white face in which the eyes almost disappear, while the mouth is enlarged to a ghoulish bigness, looks like the mask of death".

According to psychology professor Joseph Durwin at California State University, Northridge, young children are "very reactive to a familiar body type with an unfamiliar face". Researchers who have studied the phobia believe there is some correlation to the uncanny valley effect. Additionally, clown behavior is often "transgressive" (anti-social behavior) which can create feelings of unease.

A 2022 survey of 987 adults from 64 countries found that 54% of respondents reported experiencing some degree of coulrophobia.

== Urban legends and incidents ==
=== The clown sightings ===
The related urban legend of evil clown sightings in real life is known as "phantom clowns". First reported in 1981 in Brookline, Massachusetts, children said that men dressed up as clowns had attempted to lure them into a van. The panic spread throughout the US in the Midwest and Northeast. It resurfaced in 1985 in Phoenix, Arizona; in 1991 in West Orange, New Jersey; in 1990 in Brazil, through a story reported by the Brazilian tabloid Notícias Populares; and 1995 in Honduras. Later sightings included Chicago in Illinois in 2008. Explanations for the phenomenon have ranged from Stephen King's It and the crimes of serial killer John Wayne Gacy, to a moral panic influenced by contemporaneous fears of Satanic ritual abuse. It also shows similarities to the story of the Pied Piper of Hamelin. In most cases the reports were made by children, and no adults or police officers were able to confirm the sightings.

In 2013, a character who became known as "the Northampton Clown" was repeatedly sighted standing silently around the English town. The work of three local filmmakers, Alex Powell, Elliot Simpson and Luke Ubanski, the Northampton clown was similar in appearance to Pennywise from Stephen King's It. Although rumors said that the clown may have a knife, the clown himself denied these rumors through social media. In March 2014, Matteo Moroni from Perugia, Italy, owner of YouTube channel DM Pranks, began dressing up as a killer clown and terrifying unsuspecting passers-by, with his videos racking up hundreds of millions of views. In 2014, further complaints of evil clown pranksters were reported in France, the United States and Germany, possibly inspired by American Horror Story: Freak Show.

In 2014, "the Wasco clown" attracted social media attention in California. Again this clown shared a similar resemblance to Pennywise, and it was revealed that the social media postings were part of a year-long photography project conducted by the artist's wife. In Bakersfield, California "menacing" clowns were reported, some with weapons. In July 2015, a "creepy" clown was seen around a local cemetery in Chicago and terrorizing anyone in the graveyard.

There was another burst of such sightings in 2016, including in South Carolina and New York.

Researcher Ben Radford writes that there have been many surges of evil clown sightings reported, Radford says it is most likely pranksters. The urban legends and panic can cause real danger as "face-painted pranksters and innocent bystanders may be at risk" by interaction of well-intended public or police thinking a threat exists when it does not.

== Response to evil clowns in media ==
In 2014, Clowns of America International responded to the depiction of Twisty on American Horror Story, and evil clowns in media generally. President Glenn Kohlberger said, "Hollywood makes money sensationalizing the norm. They can take any situation no matter how good or pure and turn it into a nightmare. ... We do not support in any way, shape or form any medium that sensationalizes or adds to coulrophobia or 'clown fear.'"

In 2025, British post punk band Half Man Half Biscuit released a single mocking evil clowns and people's fear of them entitled "Horror Clowns are Dickheads".

== Depictions ==
The Joker character in the Batman franchise was introduced in 1940 and has developed into one of the most recognizable and iconic fictional characters in popular culture, leading Wizard magazine's "100 Greatest Villains of All Time" ranking in 2006. The contemporary "evil clown" archetype developed in the 1980s, notably popularized by Pennywise from Stephen King's It, and perhaps influenced by John Wayne Gacy, a serial killer dubbed the Killer Clown in 1978. Killer Klowns from Outer Space is a 1988 horror comedy dedicated to the topic. Although Krusty the Clown, a cartoon character introduced 1989 in the animated sitcom The Simpsons, is a comical, non-scary clown, the character reveals darker aspects in his personality. In The Simpsons episode "Lisa's First Word" (1992), children's fear of clowns features in the form of a very young Bart being traumatized by an inexpertly built Krusty the Clown themed bed, repeatedly uttering the phrase "can't sleep, clown will eat me...." The phrase inspired an Alice Cooper song in the album Dragontown (2001) and became a popular catchphrase. Evil clowns are also mentioned in a popular song by P!nk.

The American rap duo Insane Clown Posse have exploited this theme since 1989 and have inspired Twiztid and similar acts, many on Psychopathic Records, to do likewise. Websites dedicated to evil clowns and the fear of clowns appeared in the late 1990s.

- The Joker, the nemesis of Batman, whose key features are chalk-white skin, emerald-green hair, ruby-red lips and (in some iterations) a perpetual smile, sometimes a permanent sardonic grin or a Glasgow smile, depending on the adaption of the character. He is commonly depicted as a criminal mastermind, as well as a sadistic and murderous psychopath. The character is also known by several nicknames, including "the Clown Prince of Crime".
- The 1982 film Poltergeist, directed by Tobe Hooper and produced by Steven Spielberg, along with the 2015 remake of the same name directed by Gil Kenan, feature a possessed clown doll.
- Pennywise the Dancing Clown, the main antagonist in Stephen King's 1986 horror novel It and its adaptations. Pennywise was portrayed in the 1990 television miniseries version by Tim Curry and by Bill Skarsgård in the 2017 film adaptation and its 2019 sequel.
- The 1988 film Killer Klowns from Outer Space, directed by the Chiodo Brothers, features extraterrestrial evil clowns as the story's antagonists.
- The 1989 film Clownhouse, written and directed by Victor Salva, concerns brothers who are attacked in their own home by escaped mental patients dressed as clowns.
- The most famous professional wrestling depiction of an evil clown was Doink the Clown, a persona originated in 1992 by professional wrestler Matt Osborne in the World Wrestling Federation. Originally, the gimmick was that of a sadistic, evil clown, playing cruel tricks on fans and wrestlers to amuse himself and put them off guard; to help gain heat for the character, he was placed in a storyline feud with Crush, wherein Doink, after faking an injury, sneak-attacked Crush with a loaded prosthetic arm. The evil clown gimmick would be dropped later in 1993 as he turned face.
- Violator, a supervillain demon appearing in the Spawn comic books published by Image Comics, is commonly depicted in the form of "Clown", a balding, overweight man with blue facepaint.
- Sweet Tooth, a character in the Twisted Metal video game series. Sweet Tooth the Clown from Twisted Metal (2012) is a man wearing a psychotic clown mask with a flaming head and carrying a large machete. He drives a weaponised ice-cream van with the same clown face on the roof.
- Jack the Clown, an icon of the Halloween Horror Nights event celebrated at Universal Studios Florida, Universal Studios Hollywood, Universal Studios Singapore, and Universal Studios Japan.
- In the film, Drive-thru, Horny the Clown terrorizes and murders teenagers
- The 2009 BBC comedy programme Psychoville features a protagonist named Mr Jelly, "[a]n embittered hook-handed clown and children's entertainer."
- The horror film series Killjoy features a demonic killer clown as its main antagonist.
- In Puella Magi Madoka Magica, one of the most powerful Witches is one that looks like a medieval jester attached to giant cogs. Nicknamed "Walpurgisnacht", she flies around with her familiars like a mad circus troupe, laying waste to any city in her path in a fashion similar to tornadoes or hurricanes.
- In the 2012 anthology horror film Scary or Die, a drug dealer is bitten by a clown at a birthday party, and he begins to transform into a cannibalistic clown himself.
- The 2012 film Stitches features a murderous birthday clown, portrayed by Ross Noble, who is resurrected from the dead in order to enact revenge upon the children who contributed to his death.
- The 2013 horror film All Hallows' Eve, the 2016 film Terrifier and its subsequent sequels feature a homicidal clown named Art the Clown.
- The FX horror anthology series American Horror Story used two instances of evil clowns: The first being Twisty the Clown from the fourth season Freak Show, who made a cameo appearance in Cult where the season's antagonist created a murderous clown cult to orchestrate his rise to political power.
- The 2014 film Theatre of Fear, directed by Andrew Jones, features a murderous clown character played by Nathan Head.
- The 2014 horror film Clown, directed by Jon Watts and produced by Eli Roth, follows a man who, upon finding and wearing a clown suit, becomes trapped in the cursed skin of an ancient Nordic demon known as the "Clöyne".
- A 2018 update to the 2016 asymmetrical horror game Dead by Daylight added a new killer called The Clown, whose appearance and backstory fit the evil clown archetype.
- The 2021 film Behind the Sightings was inspired by the viral clown sightings of 2016.
- The 2026 British documentary film Clown Panic, directed by Ed Perkins, examines the 2016 moral pandemic.

== Gallery ==
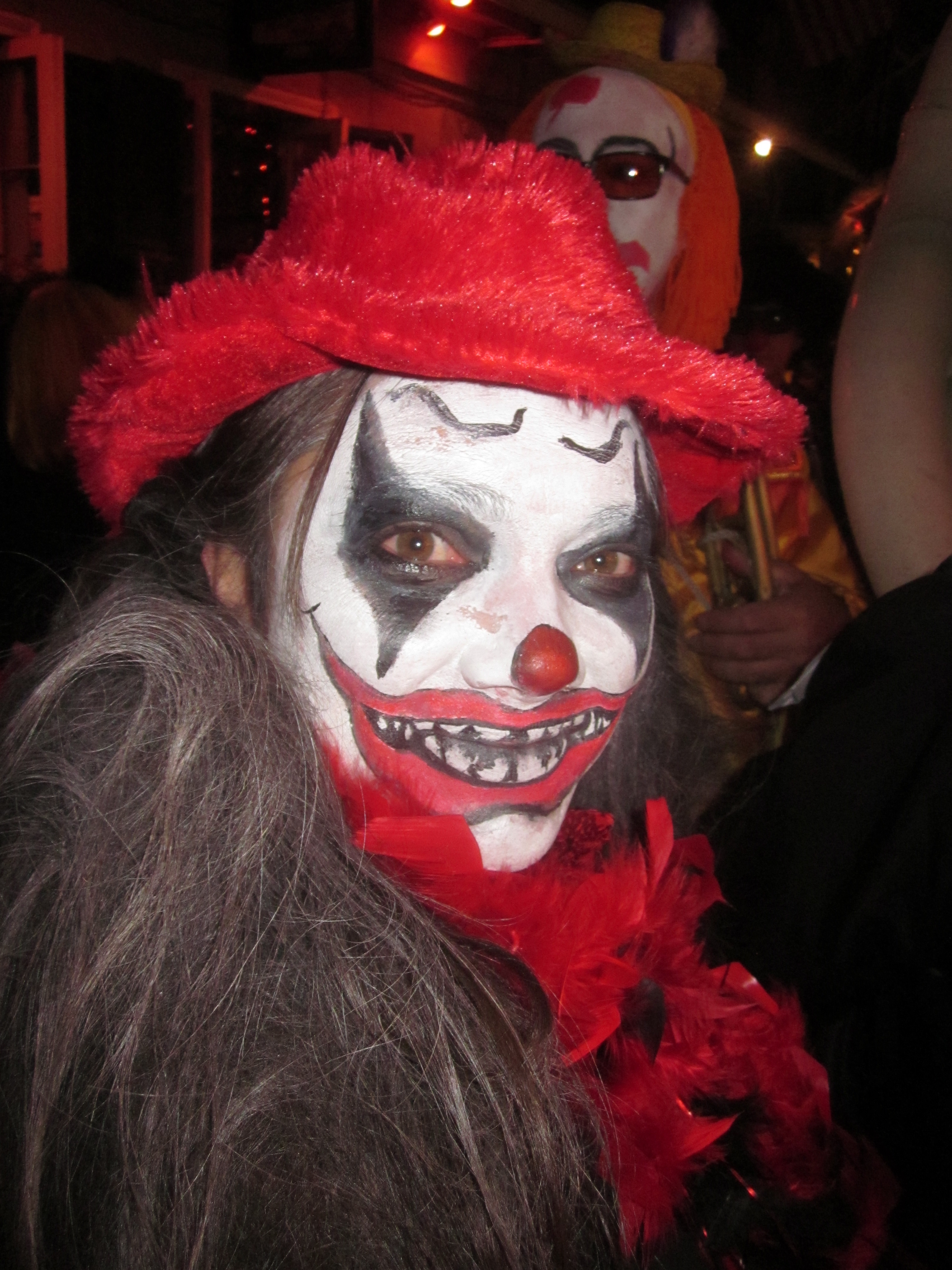
Scary clown in Hallween Tumble 2012

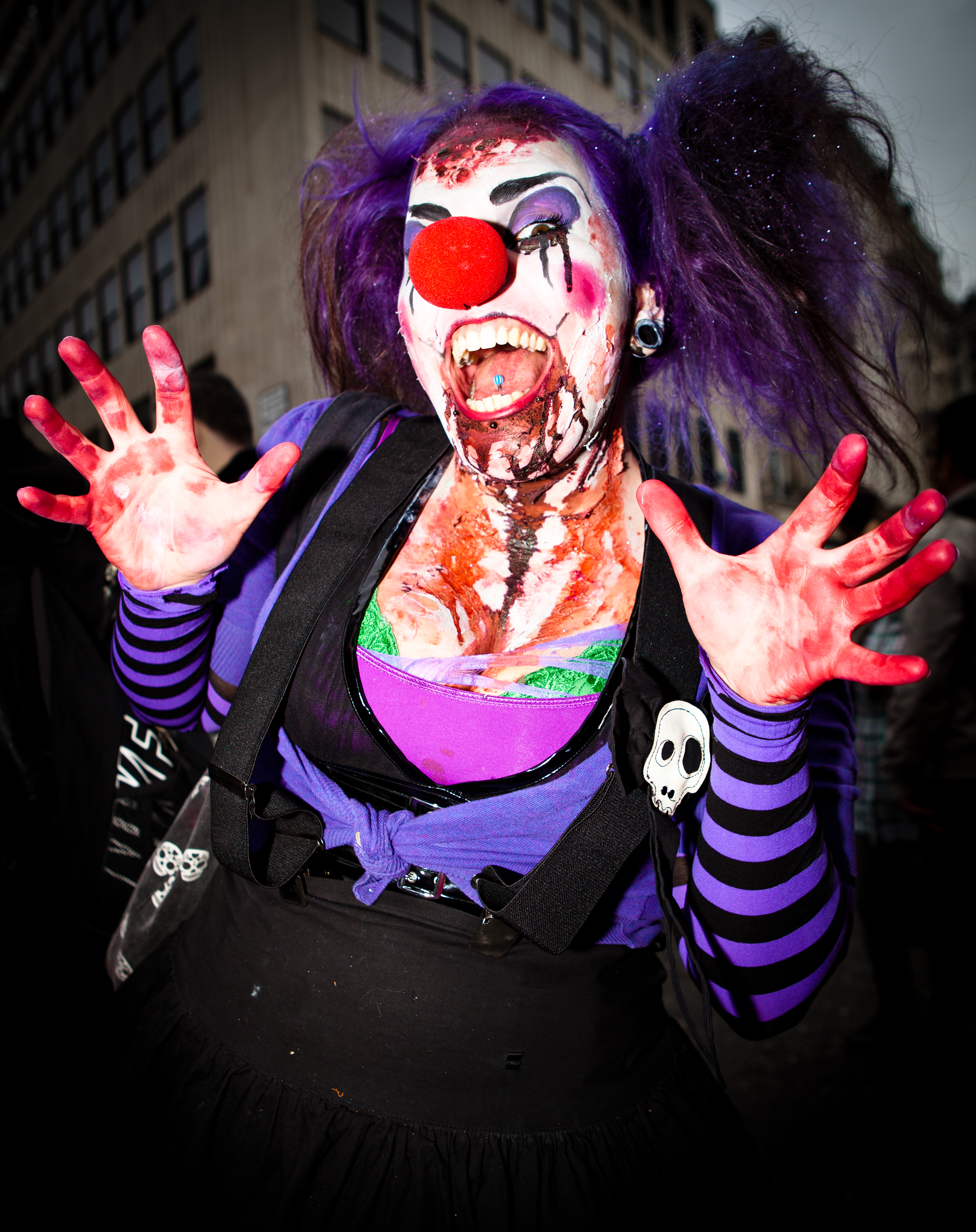
Zombie clown at World Zombie Day, London 2011.

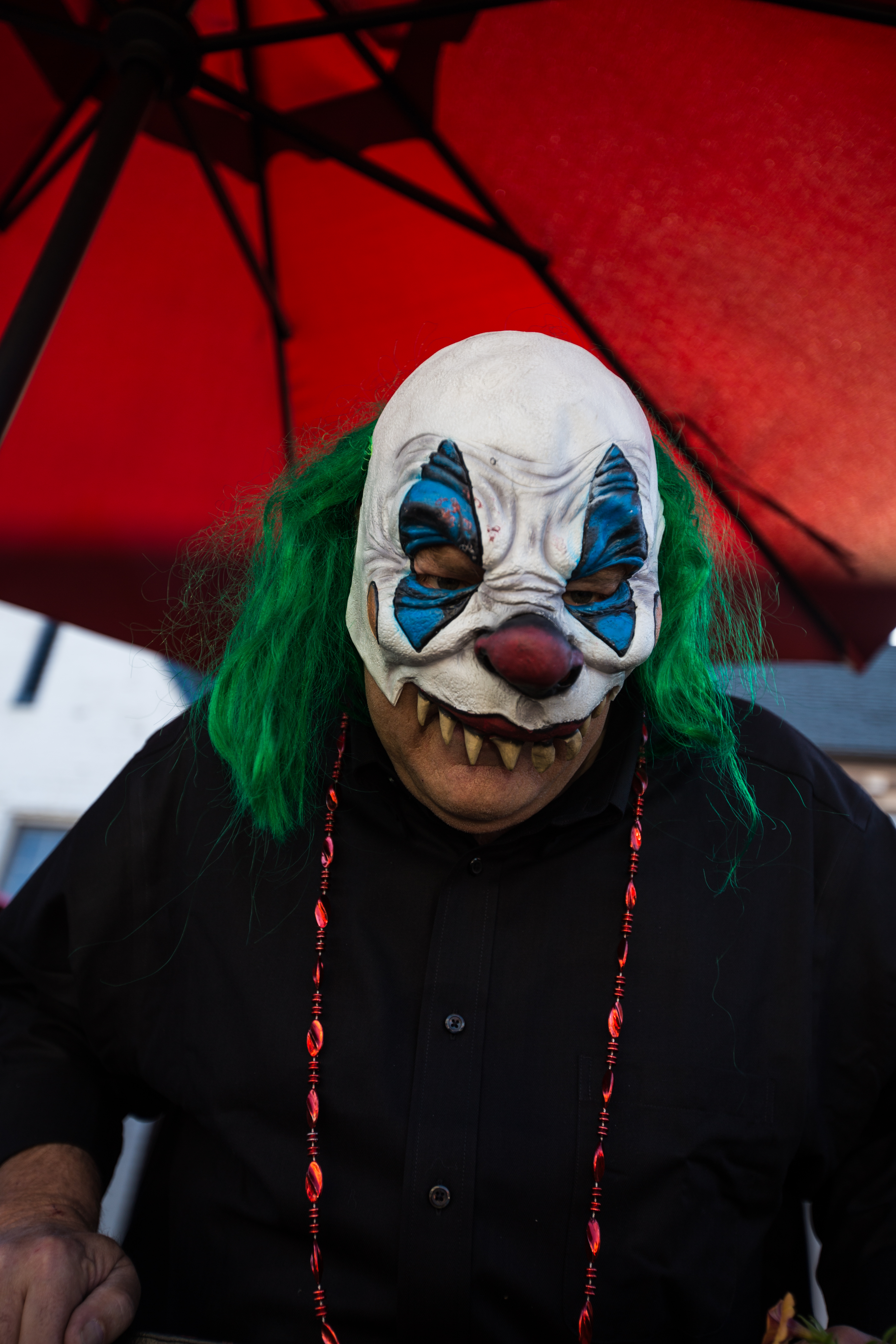
Creepy clown with umbrella

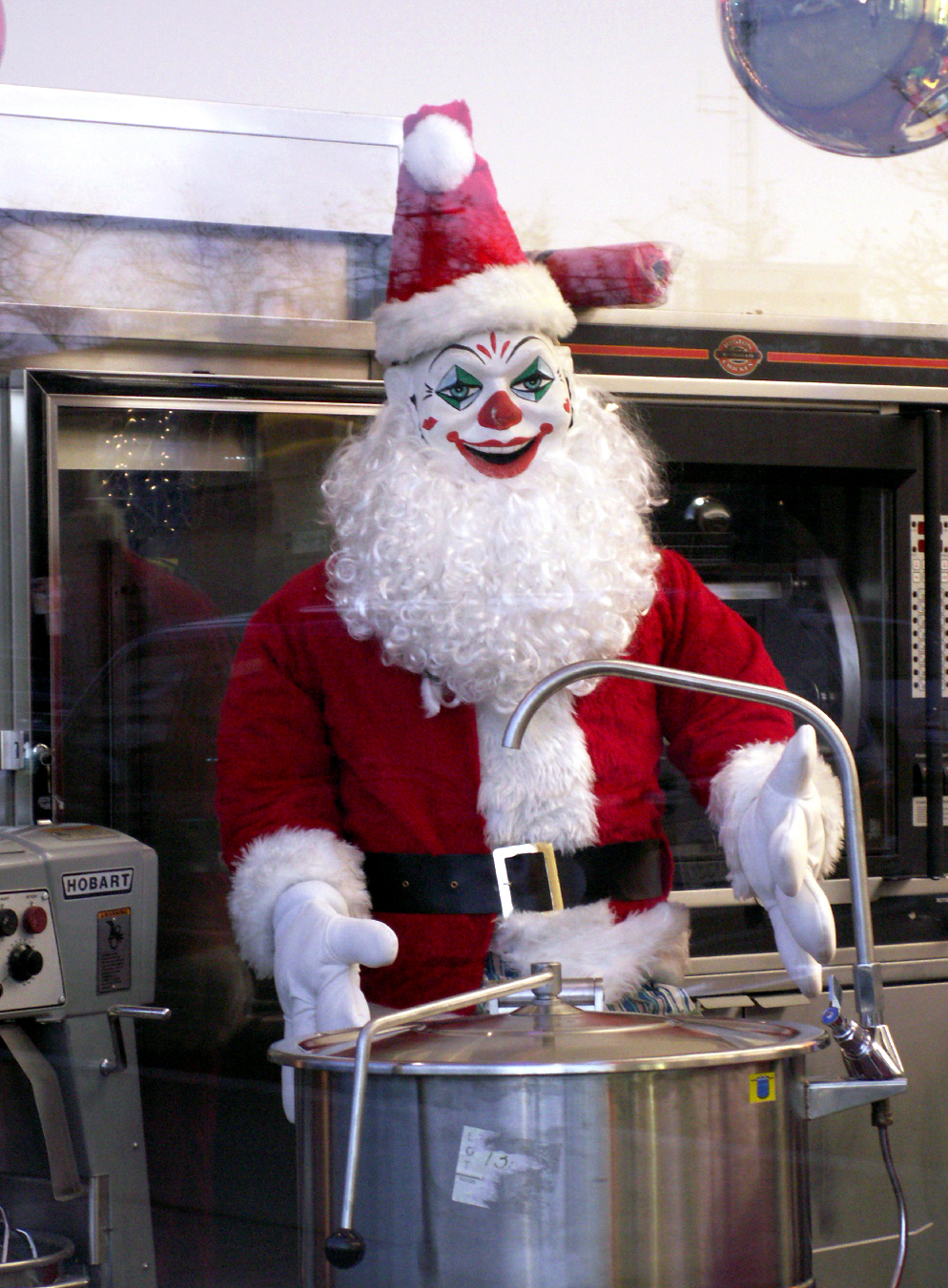
Evil clown Santa Claus

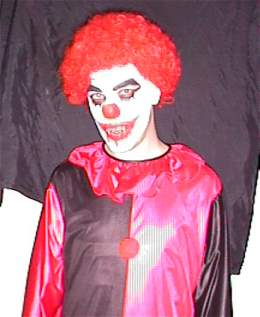
Halloween Evil Clown, 1999

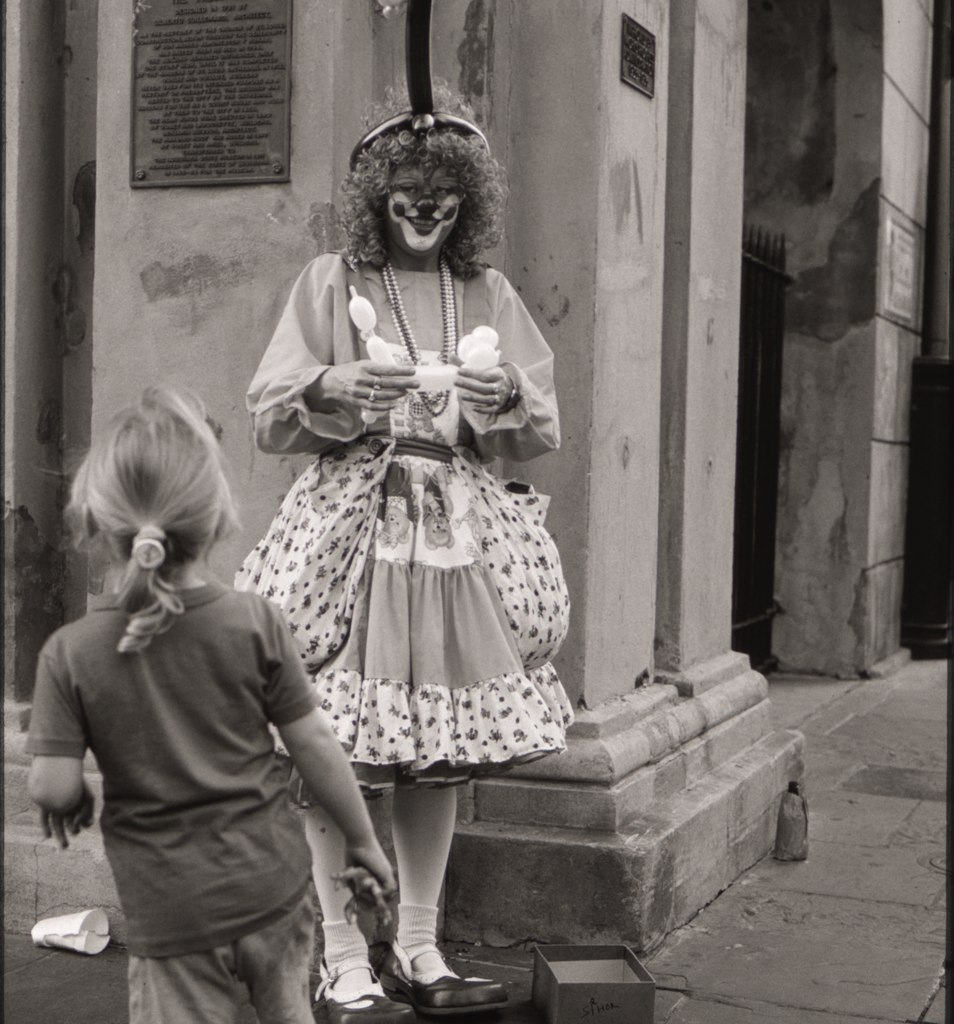
Scary clown at New Orleans, 1999

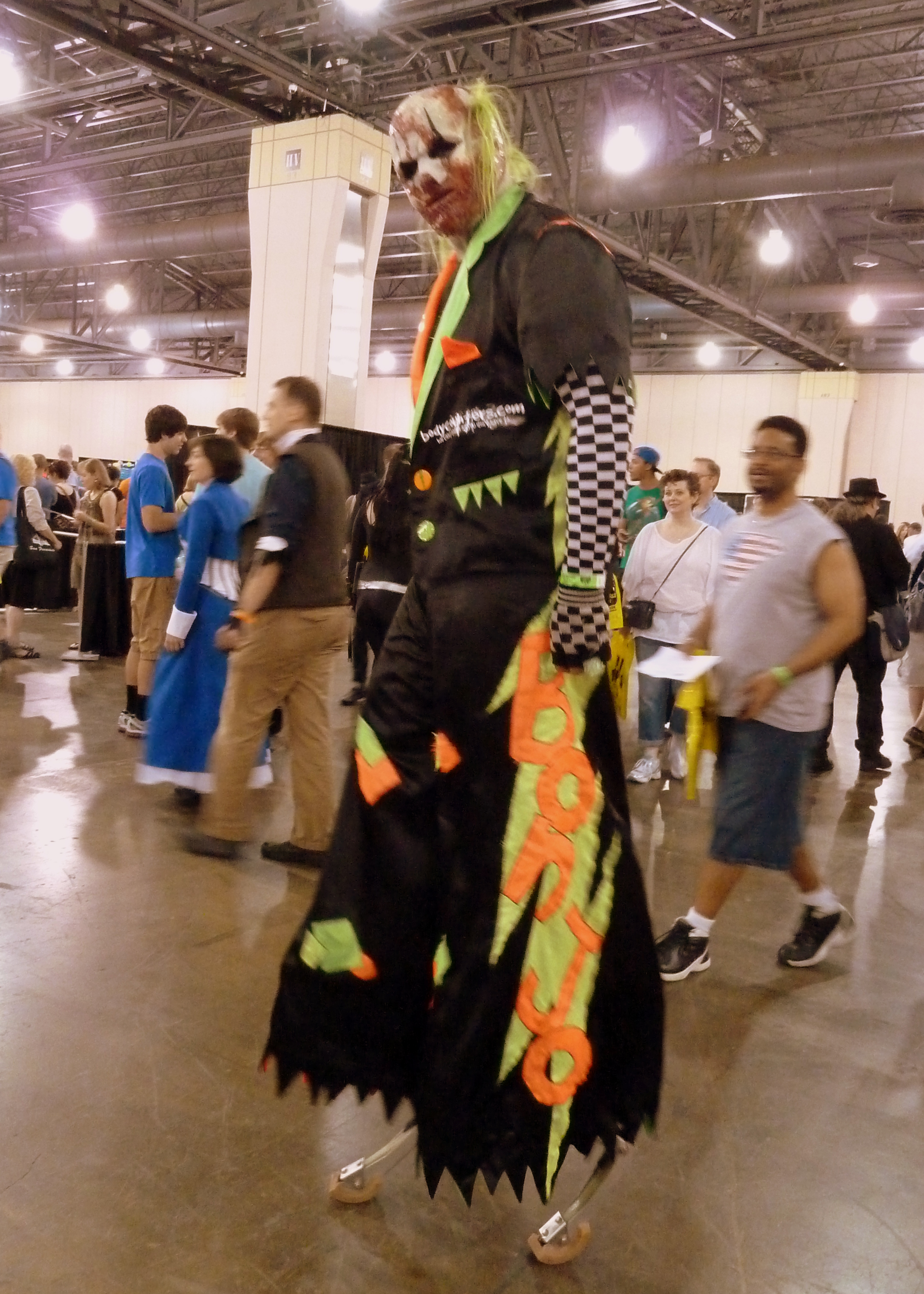
Scott Suloff as BonJo the Clown at Wizard World Philadelphia 2013

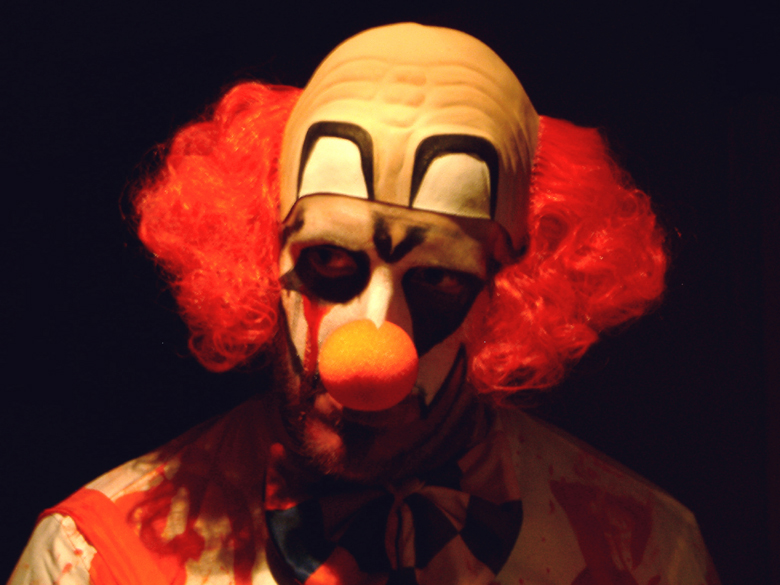
Scary clown makeup

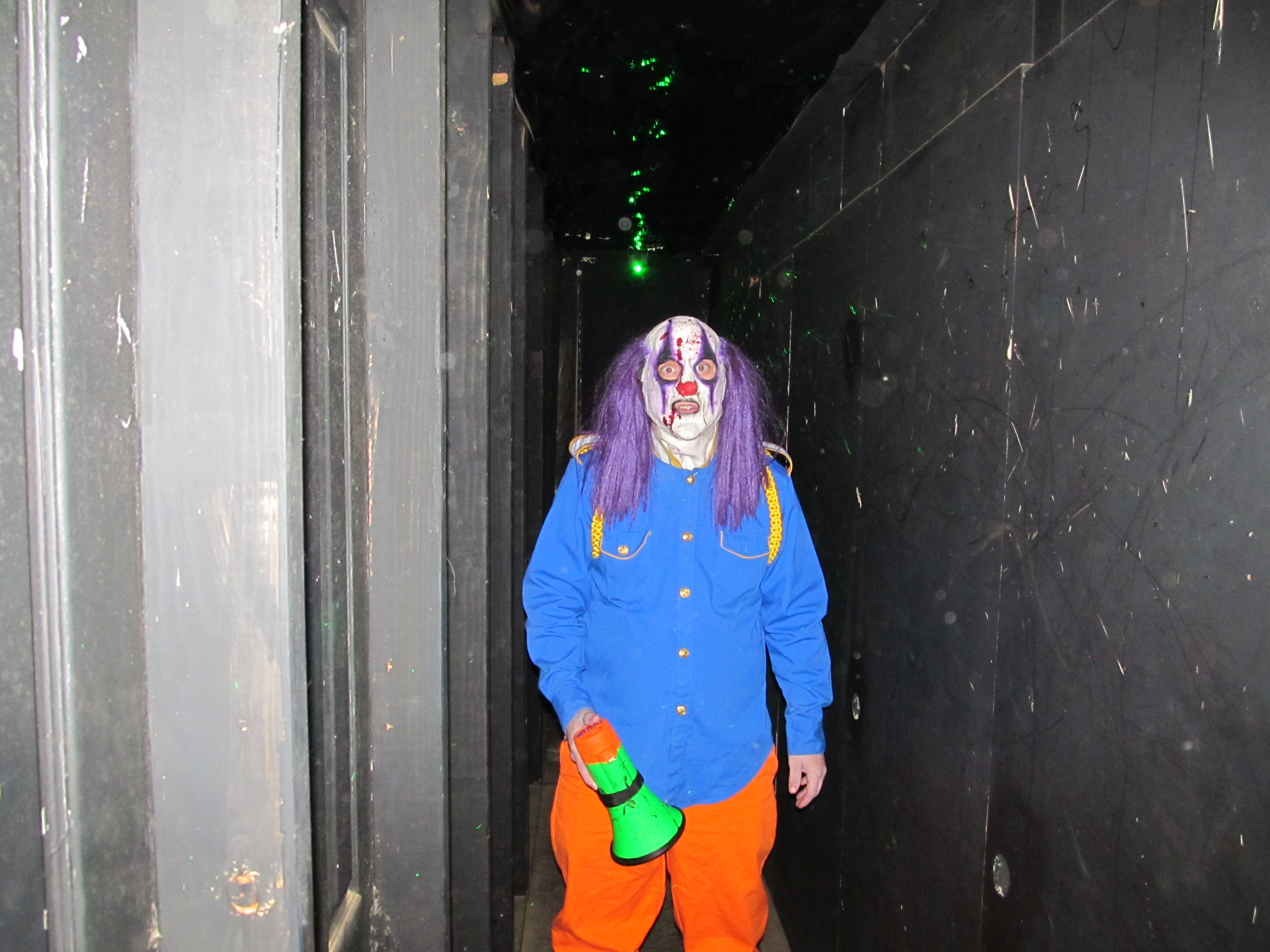
Evil clown in hallway, at 'Doc Wilkes House of Horrors' in Longview, Texas

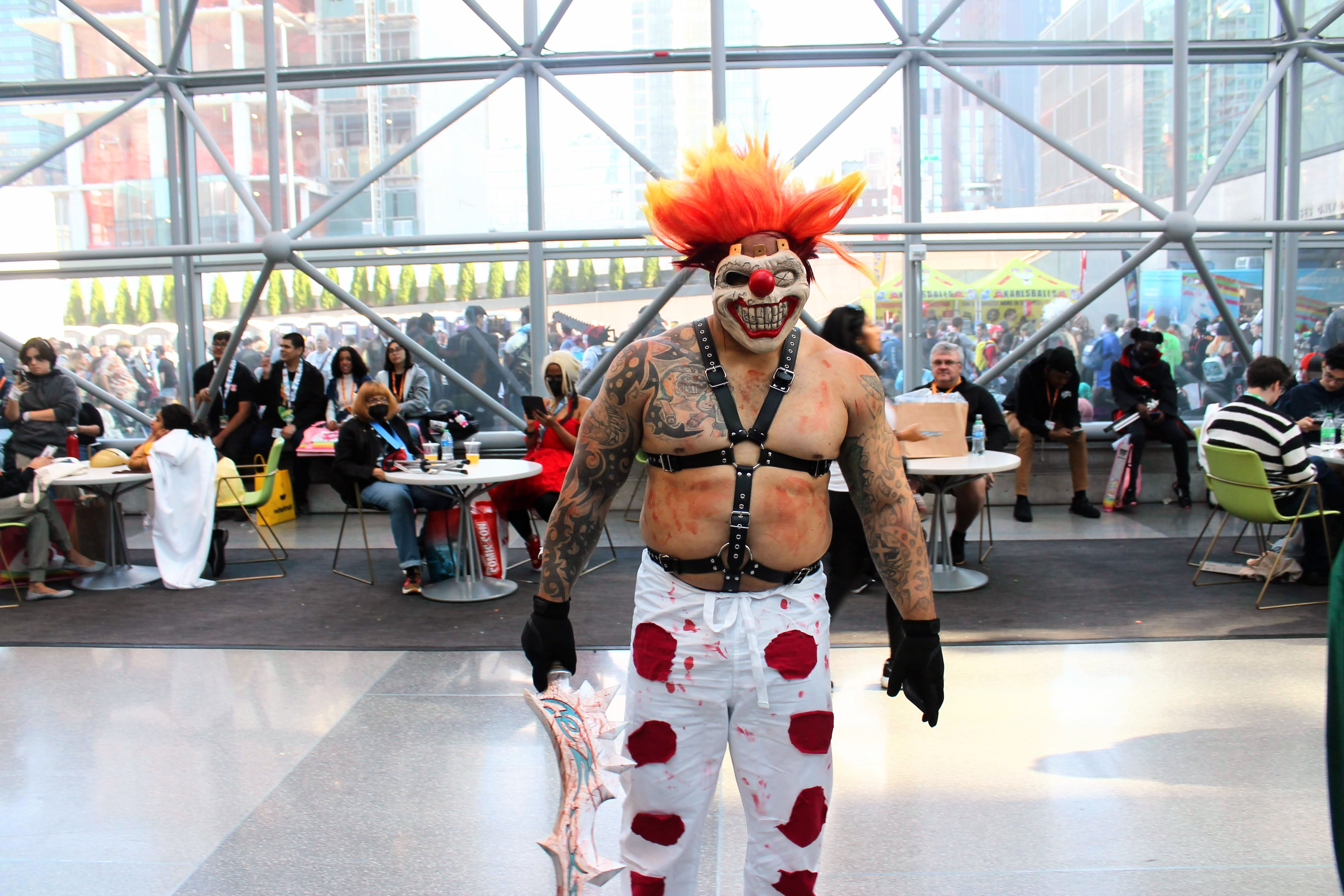
Killer clown in New York Comic Con 2022

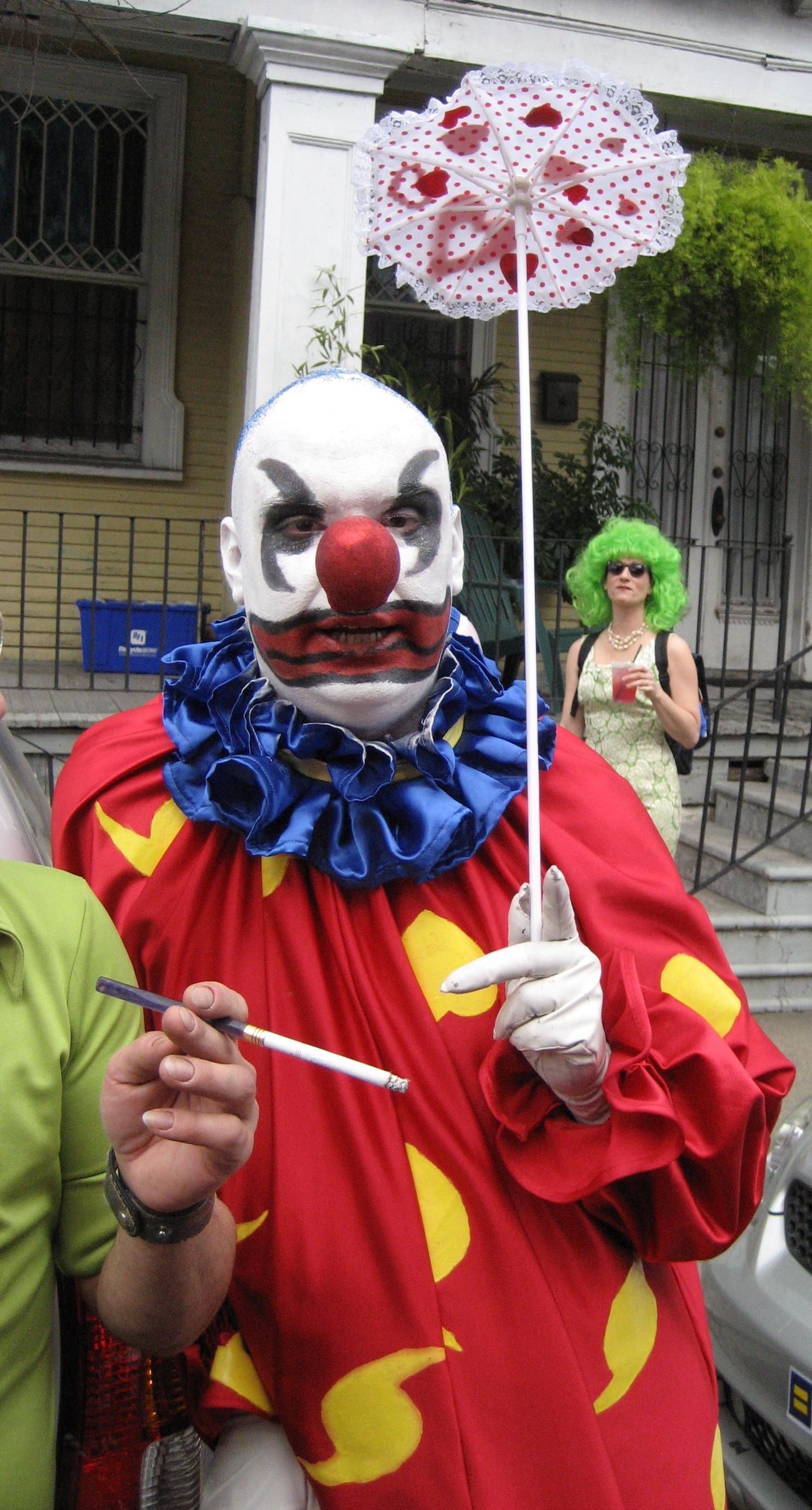
Evil clown in New Orleans

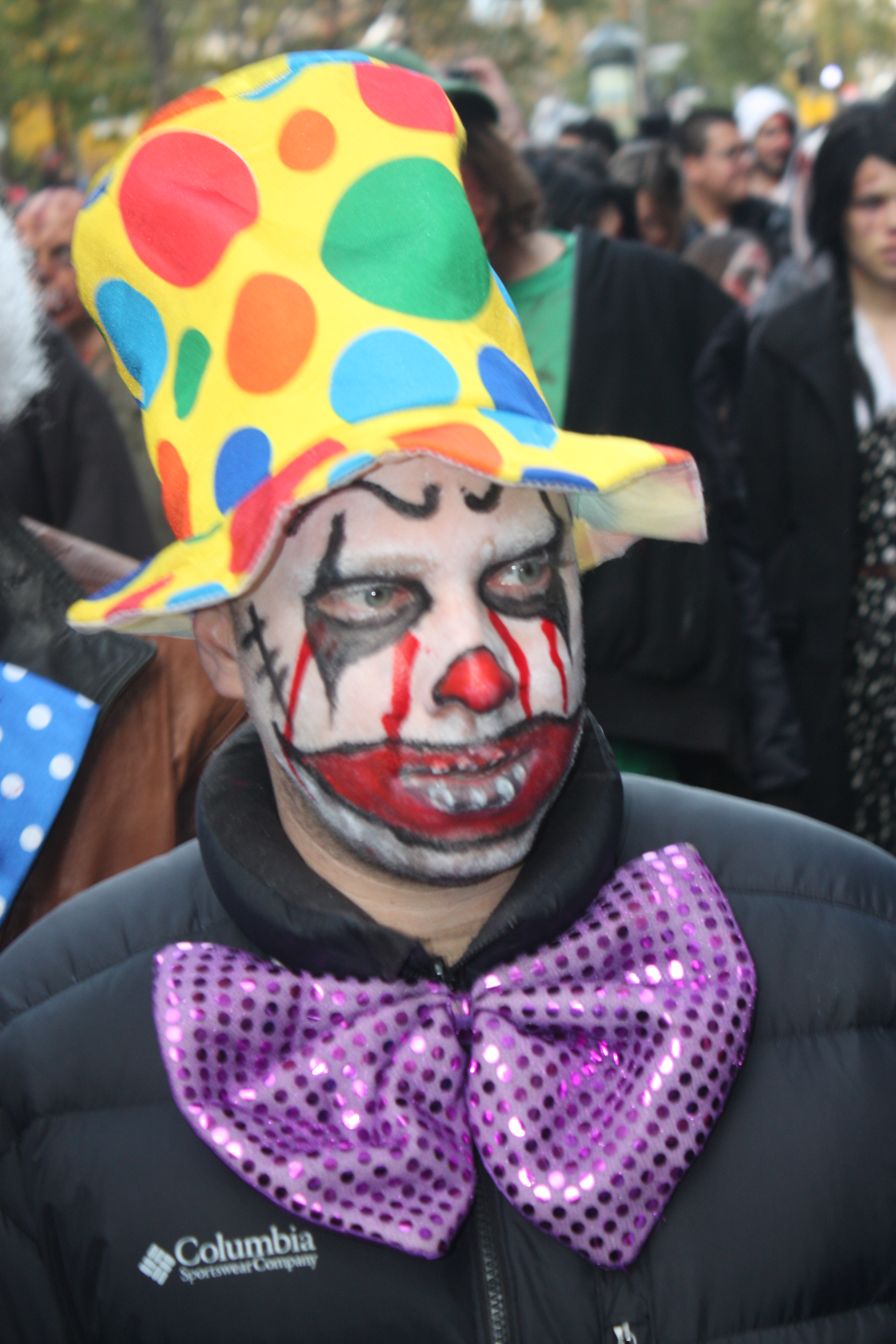
Evil clown in Montreal Zombie Walk 2015

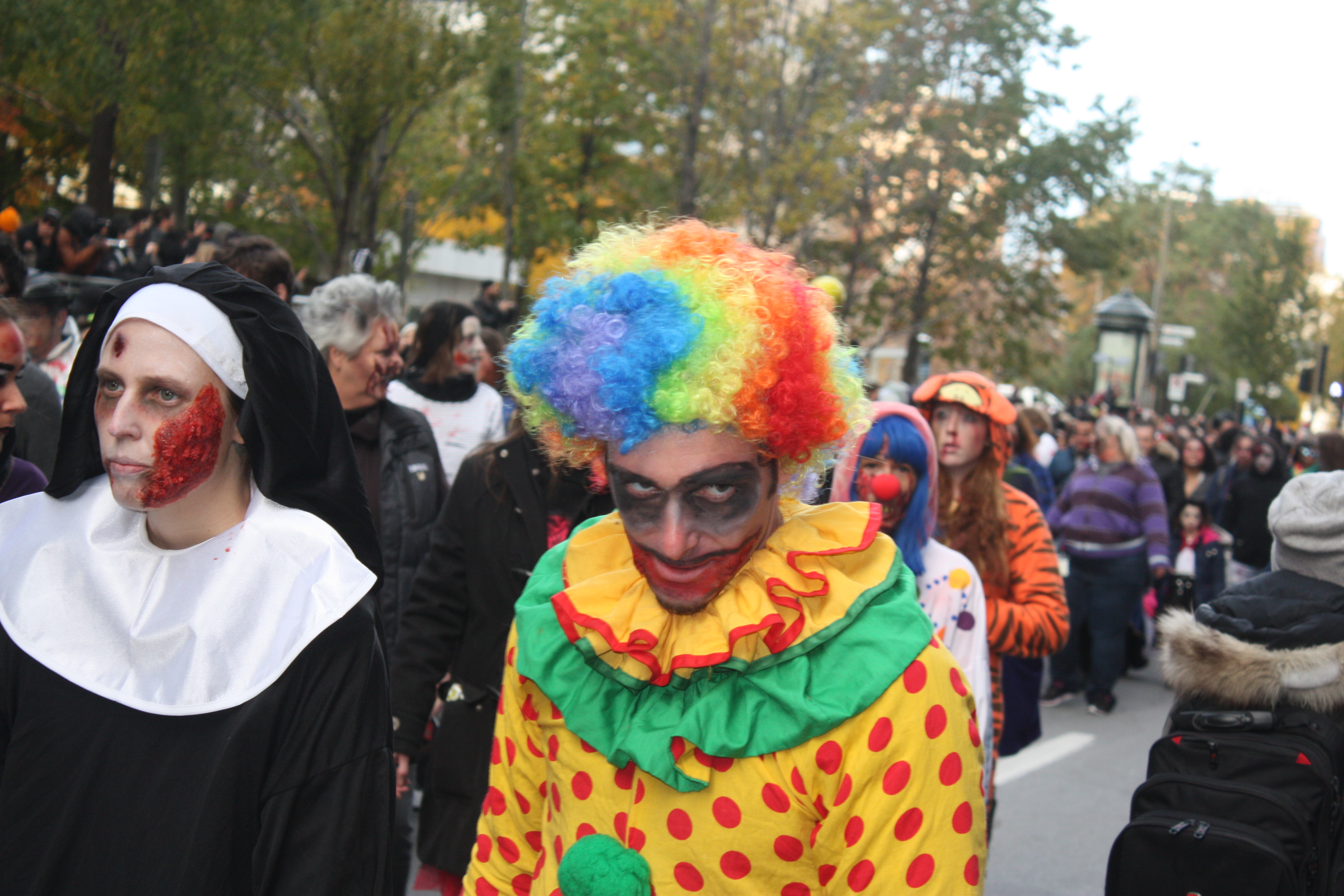
Evil clown in Montreal Zombie Walk 2015

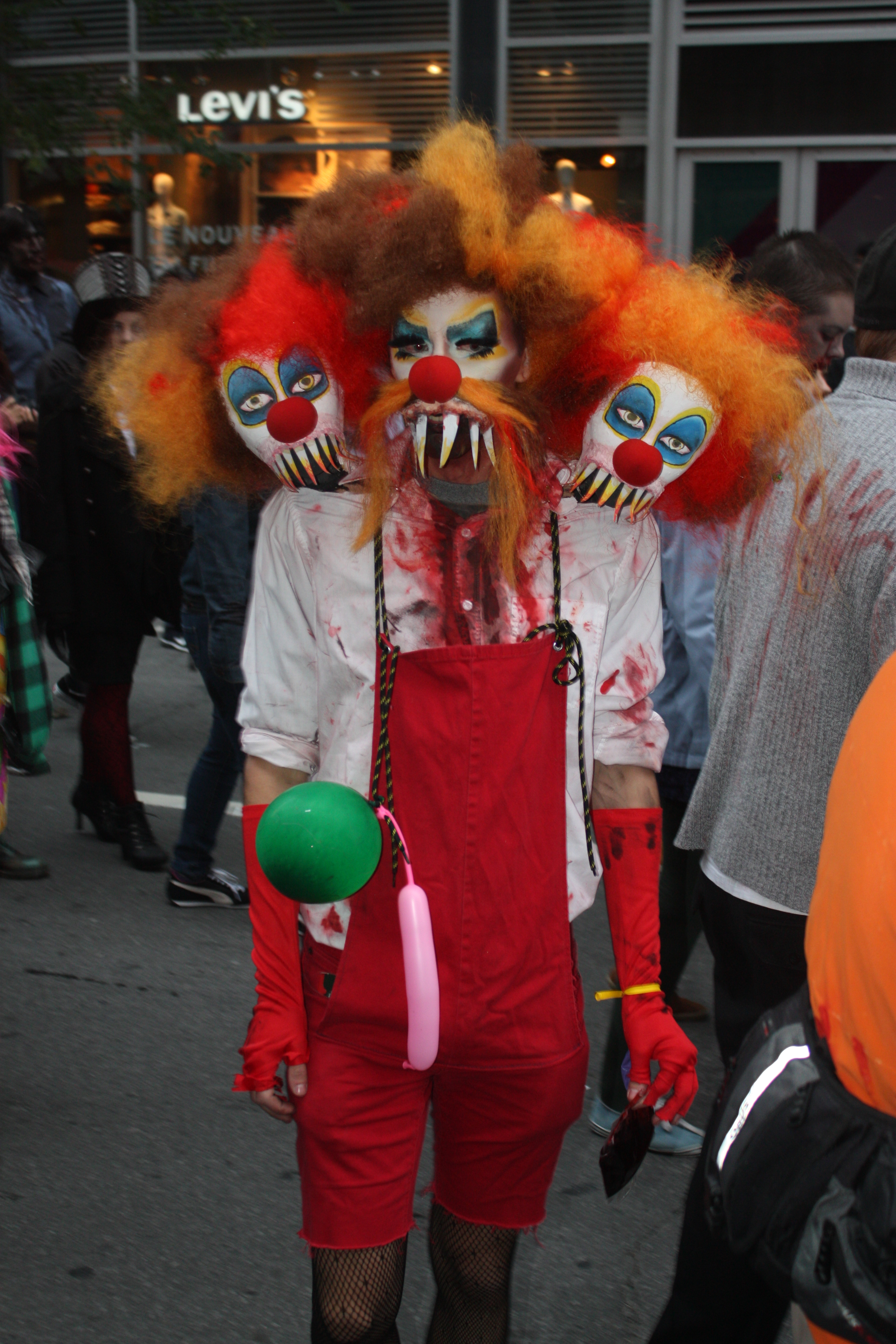
Evil clown in Montreal Zombie Walk 2015

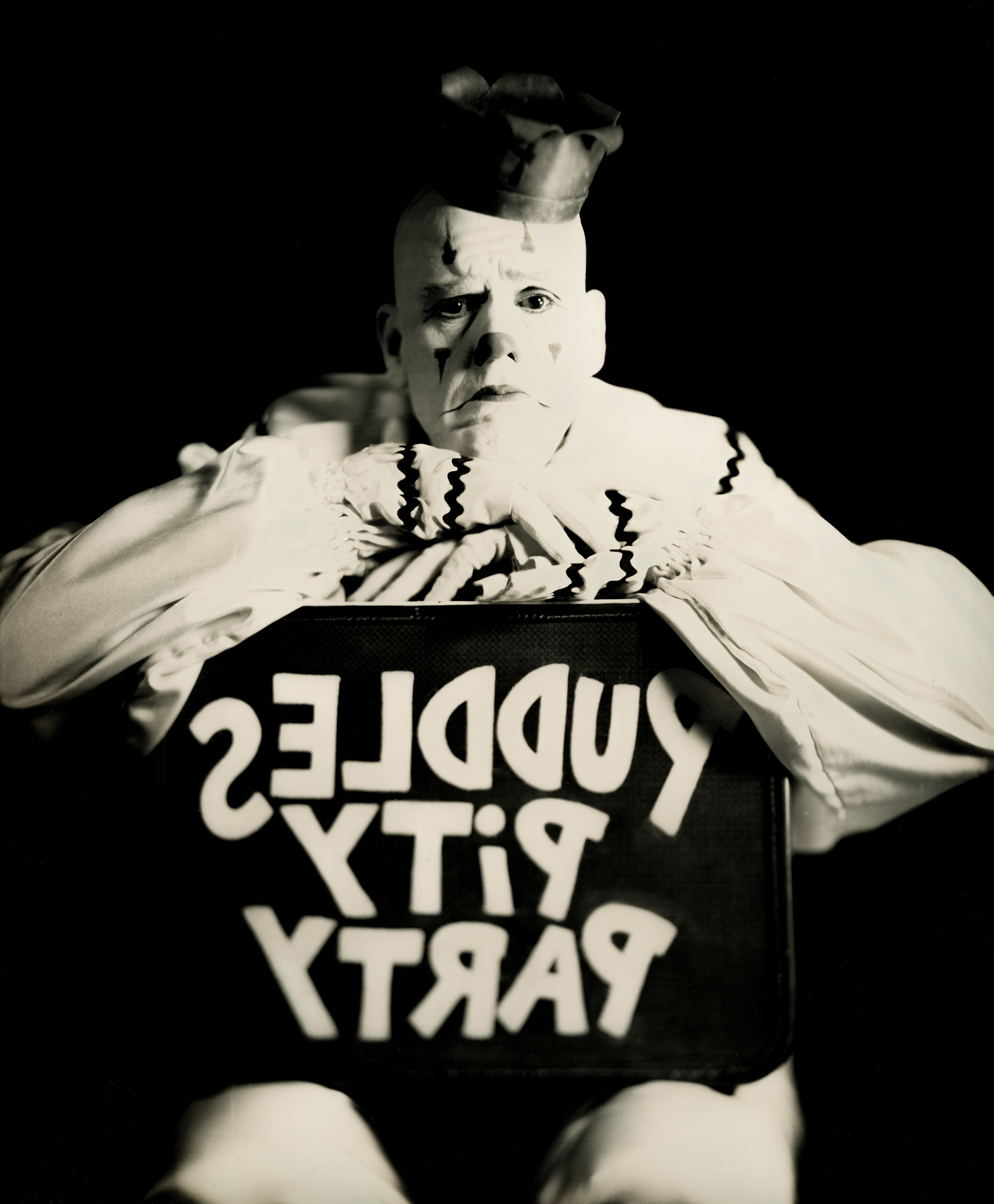
Puddles the Clown

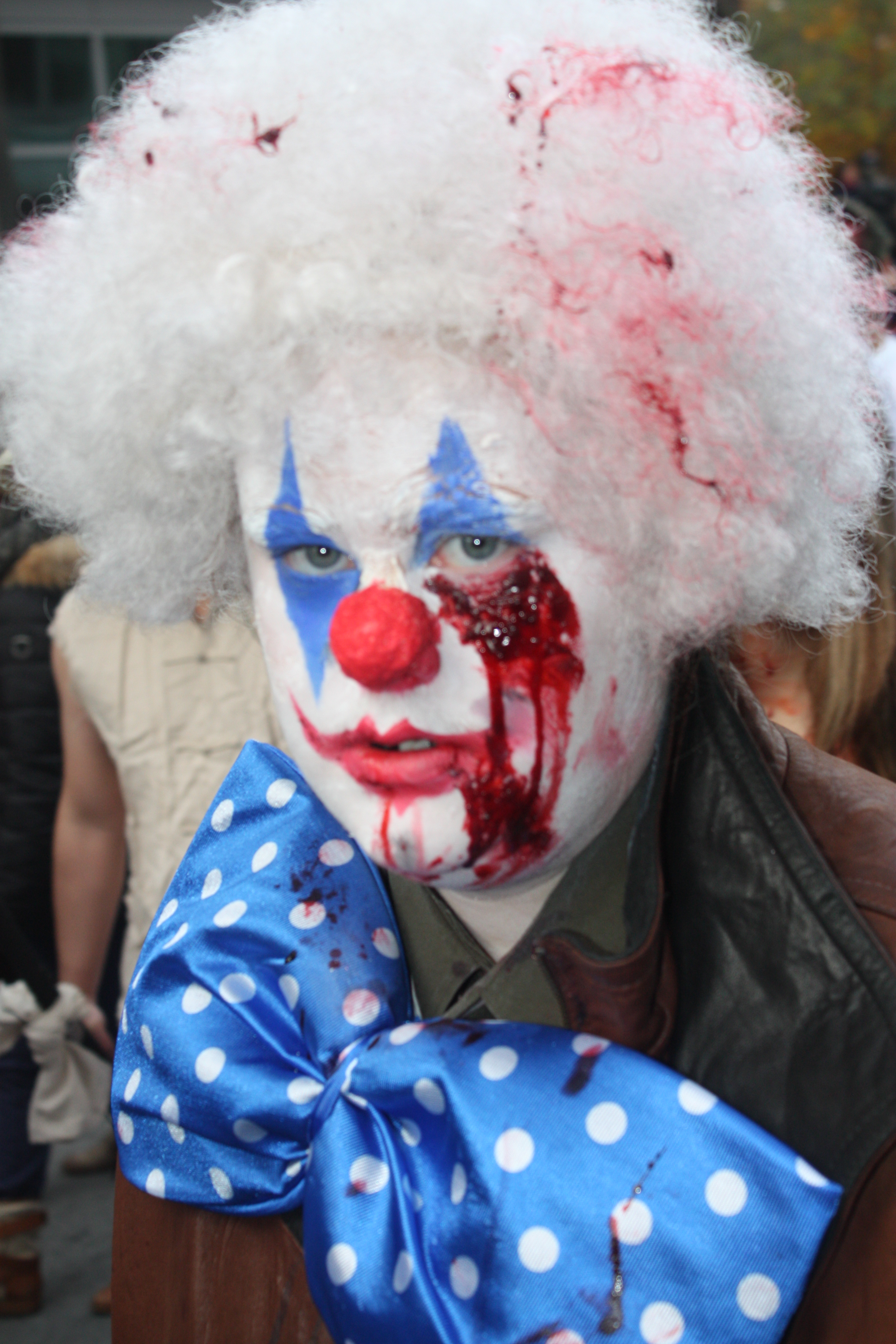
Evil clown in Montreal Zombie Walk 2015

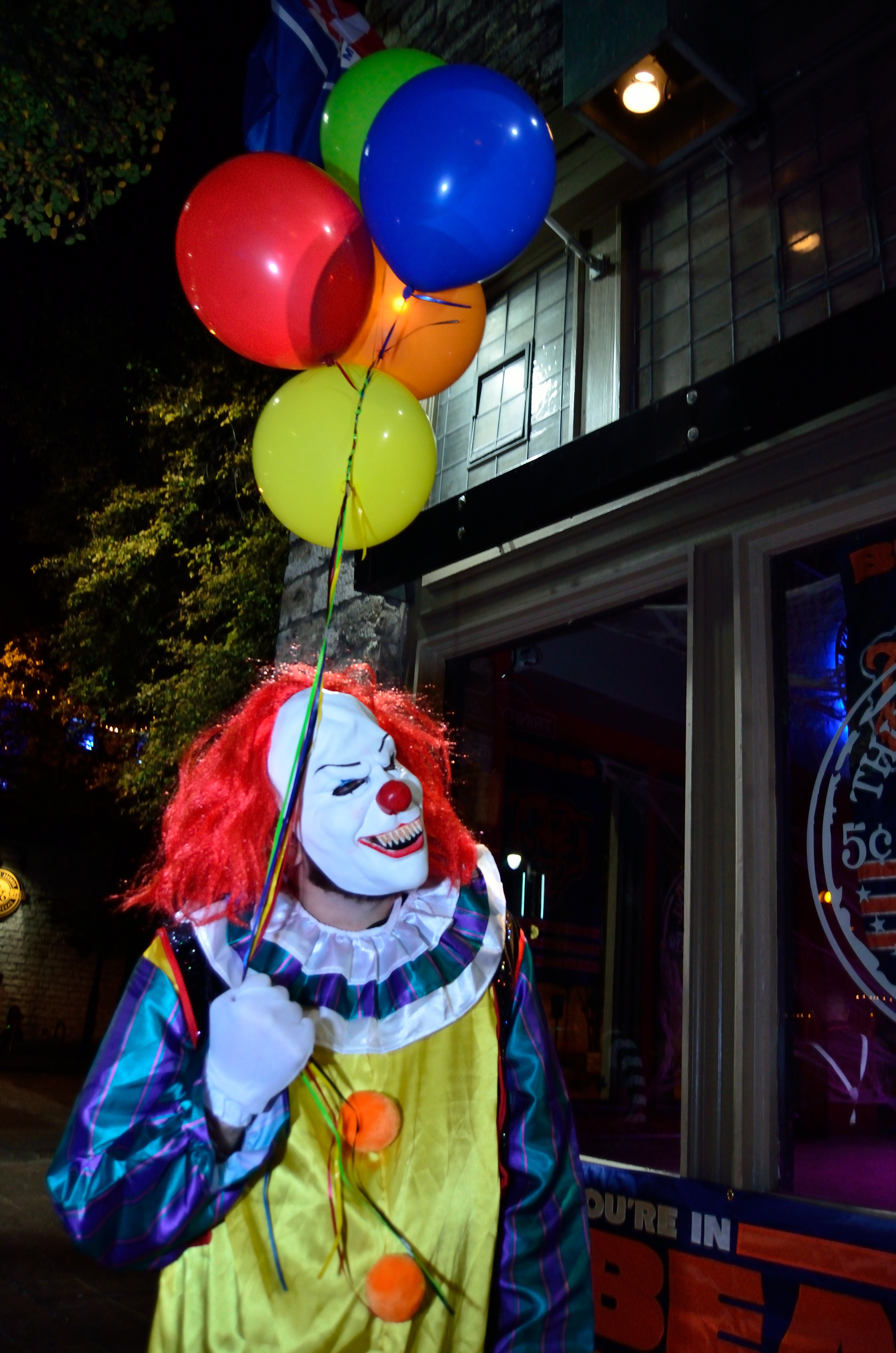
Evil clown in Halloween in Austin, Texas, 2016

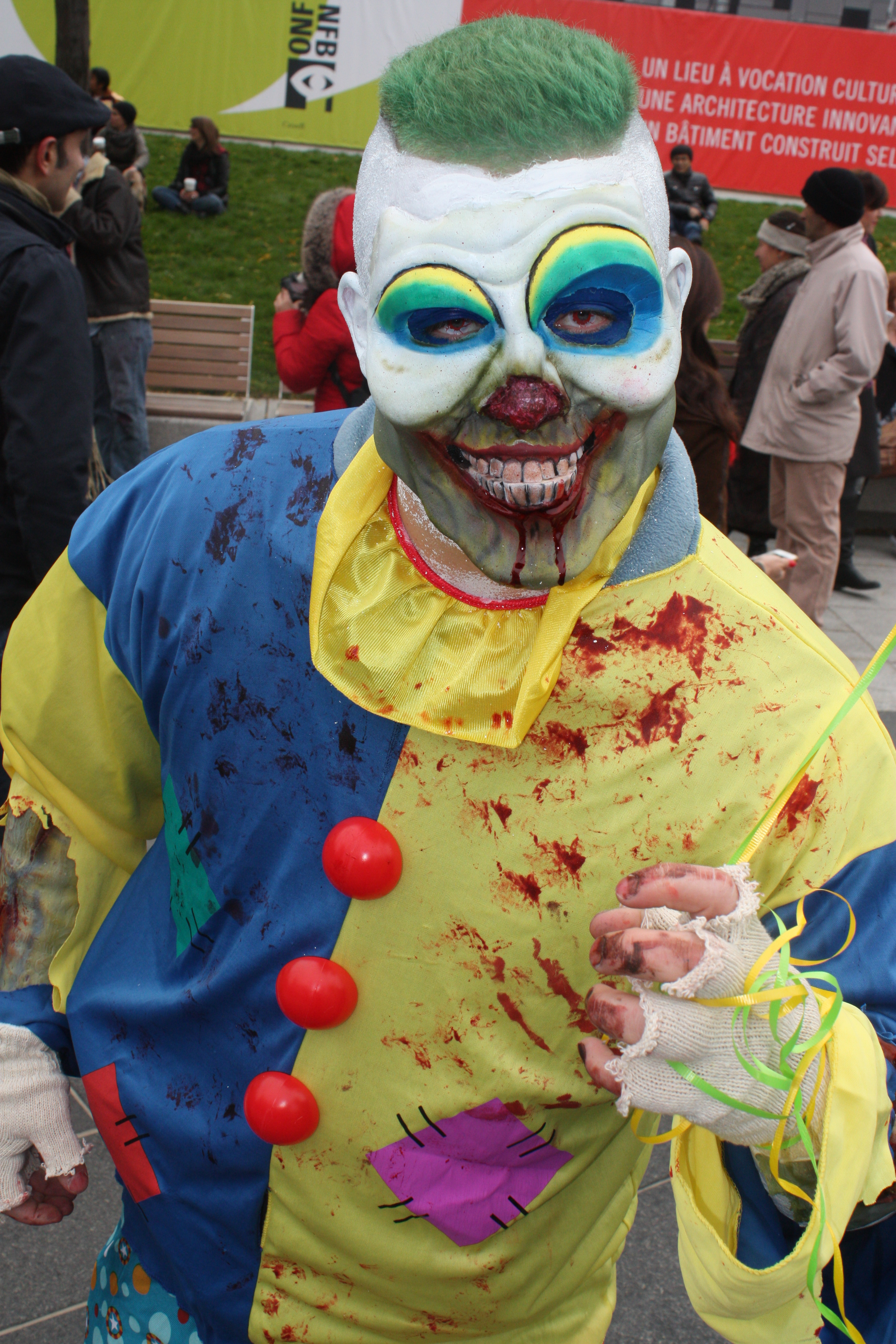
Evil clown in Montreal Zombie Walk 2015

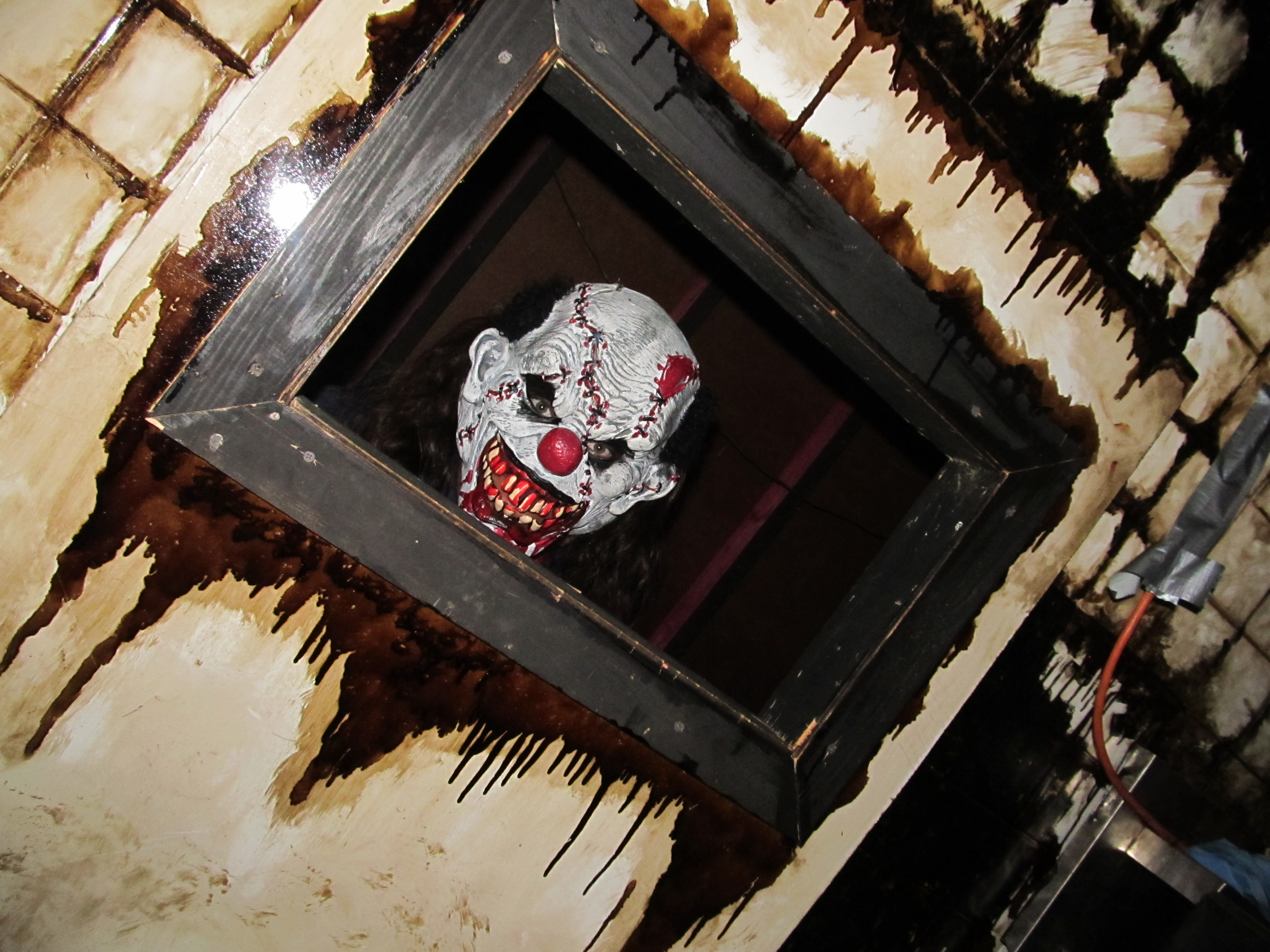
Evil clown in a 'freezer' scare at Doc Wilkes House of Horrors in Longview, Texas

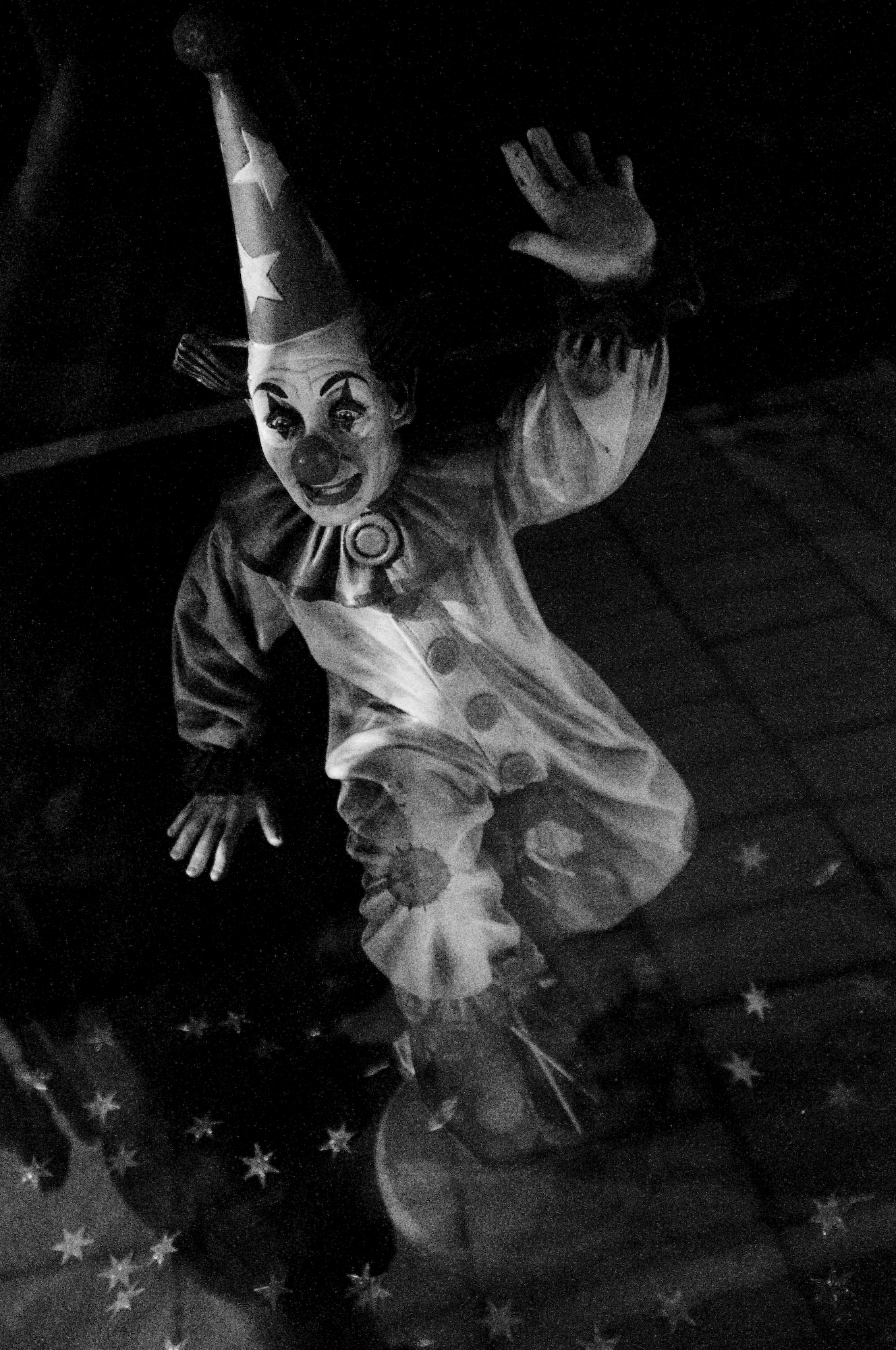
Clown in window 2008

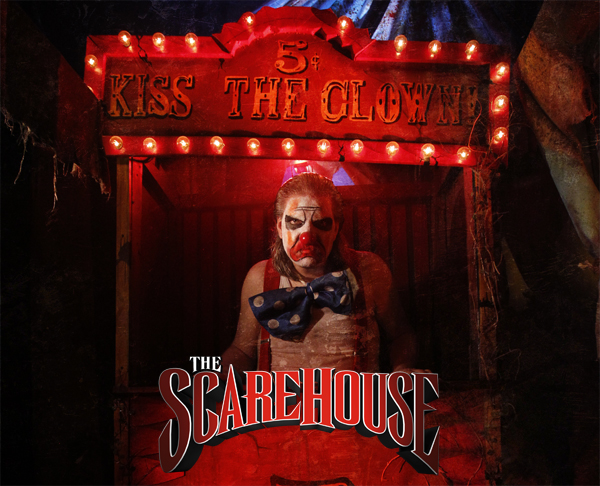
Creepo The Clown

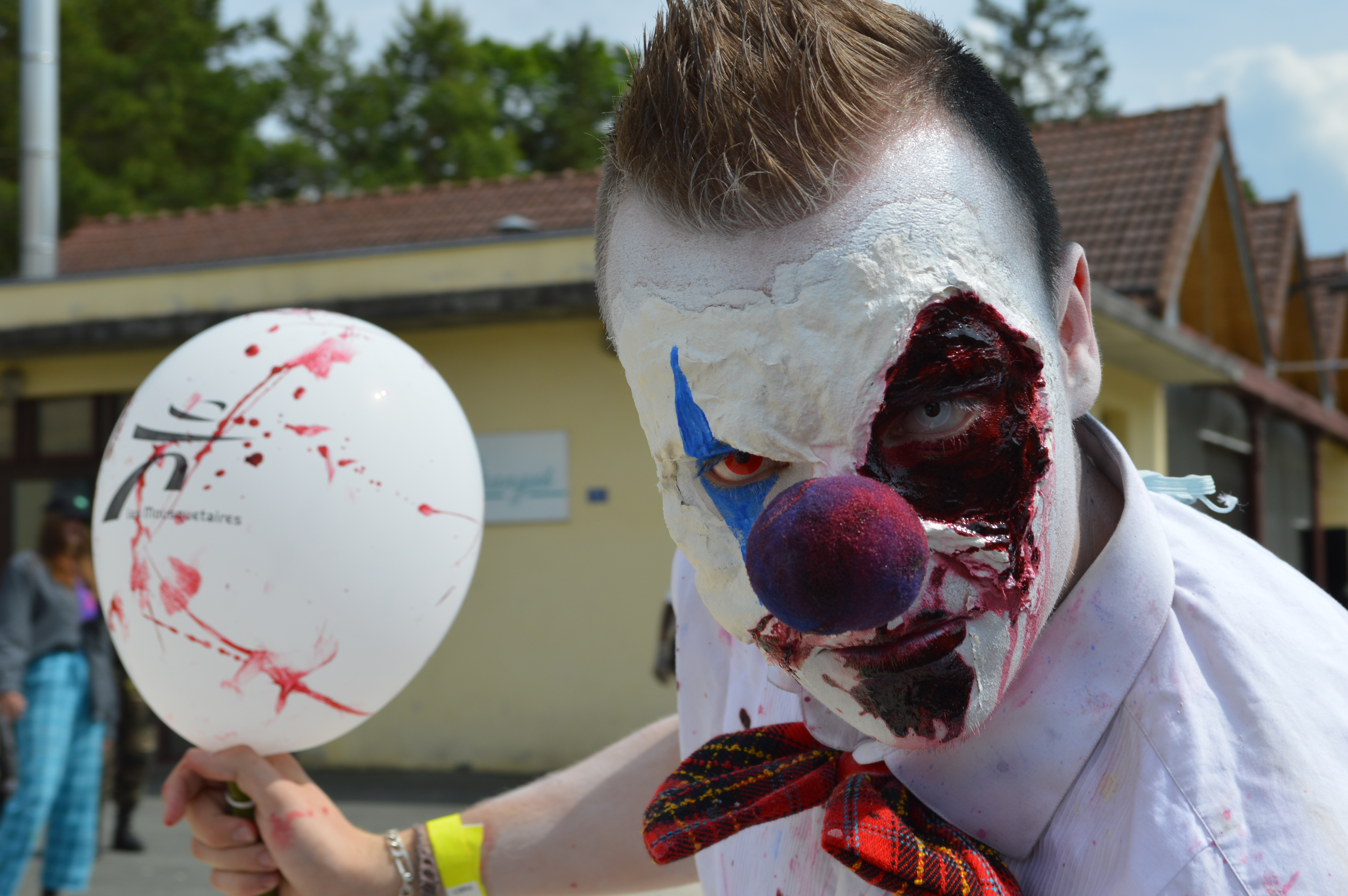
Evil clown in Bloody Week-End 2014

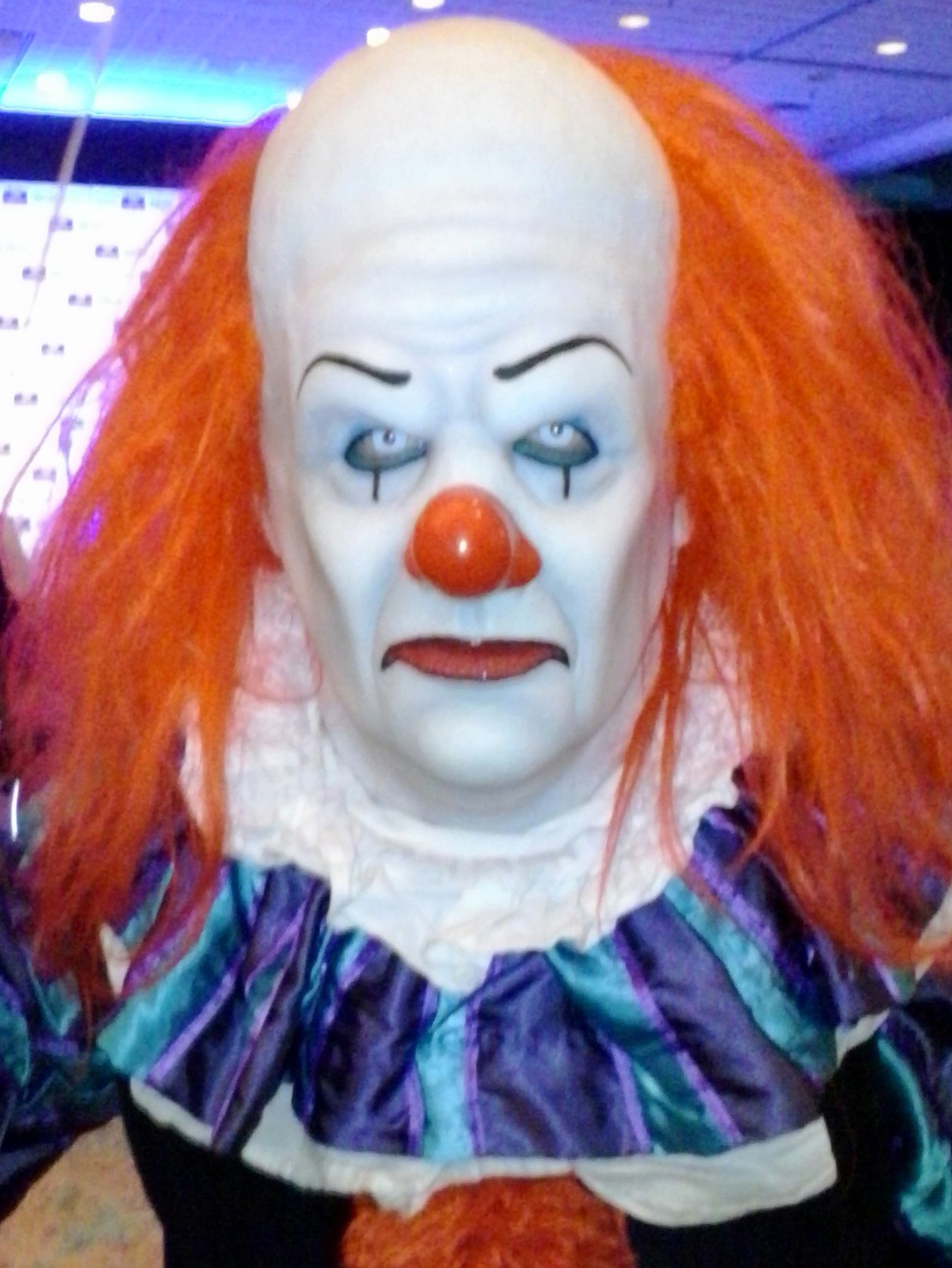
A cosplayer in Pennywise (miniseries) costume at the 2013 Wizard World Chicago

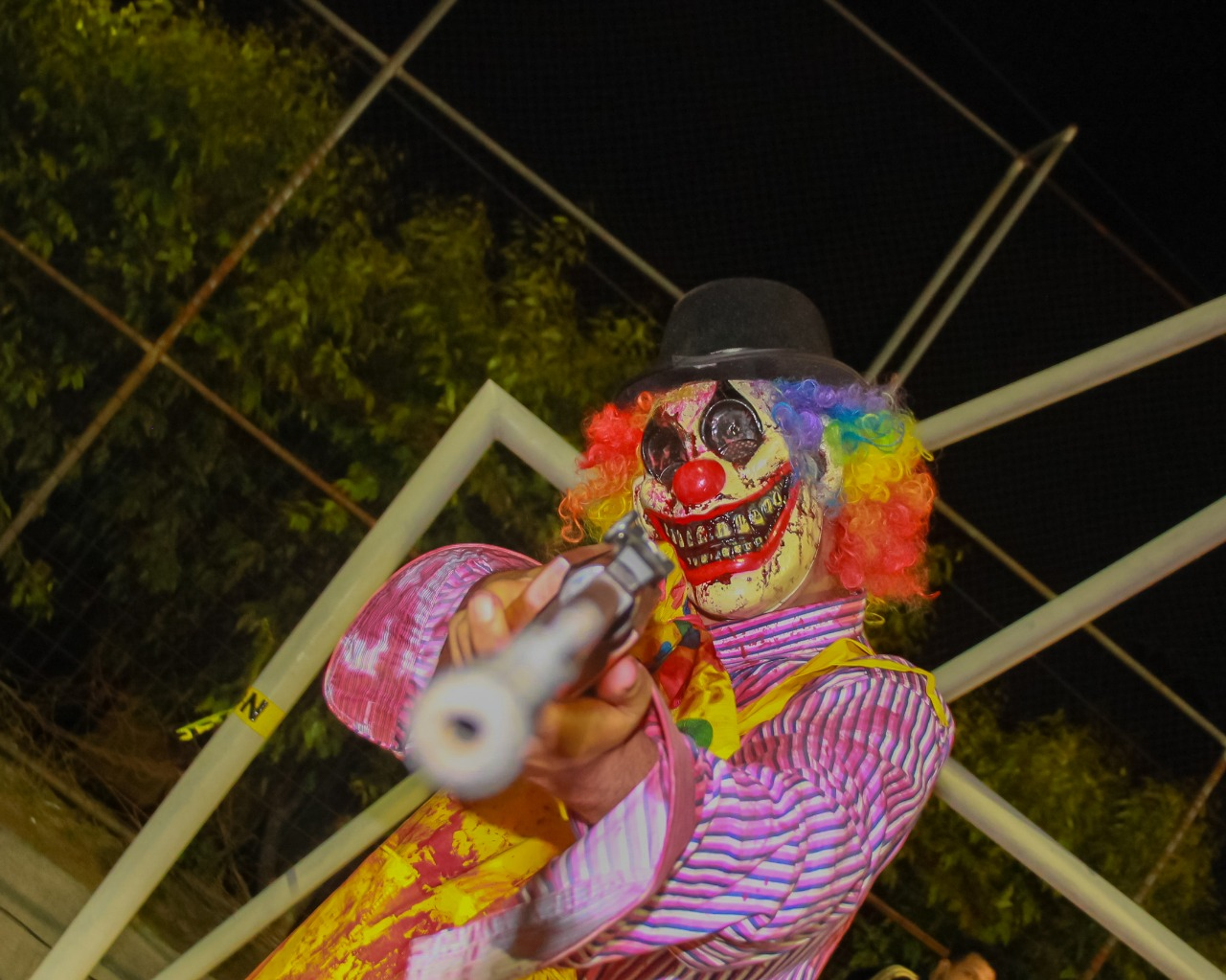
A man dressed as evil clown at Myth Festival, held at the Santa Alegría Sports Center

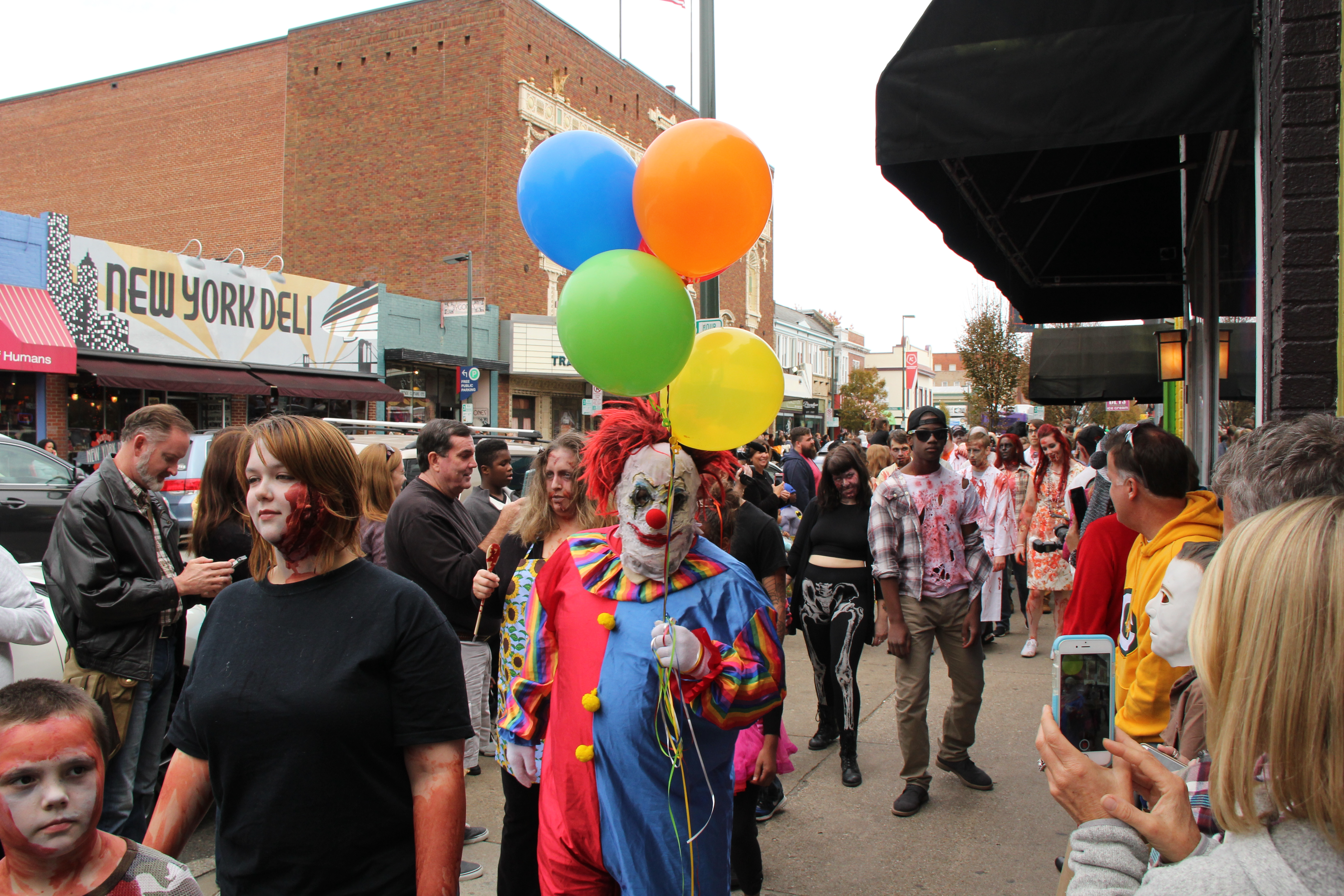
Evil clown in 2015 Richmond Zombie Walk Time Lapse Stills

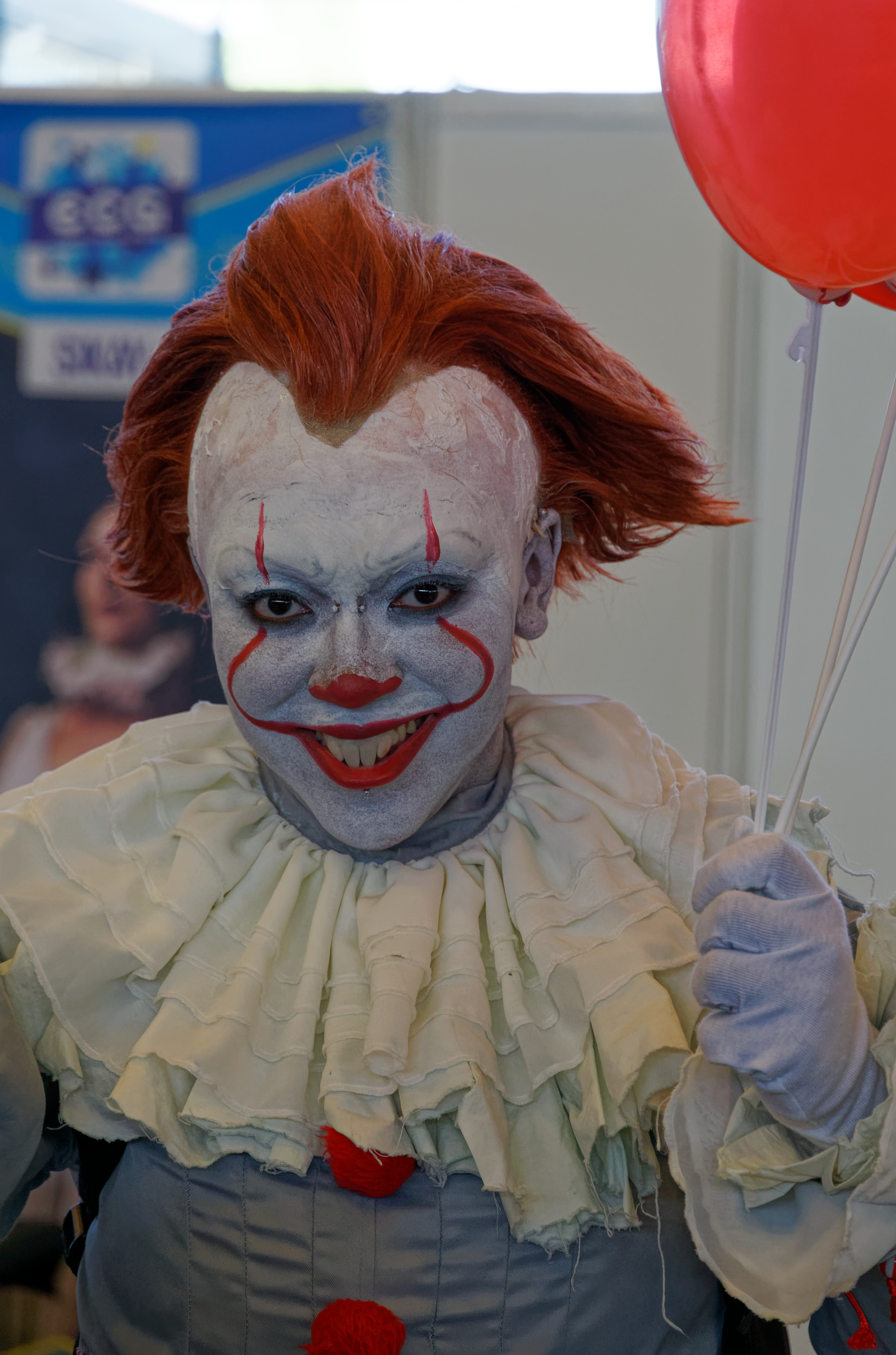
A cosplayer in Pennywise costume at the Japan Expo 2019

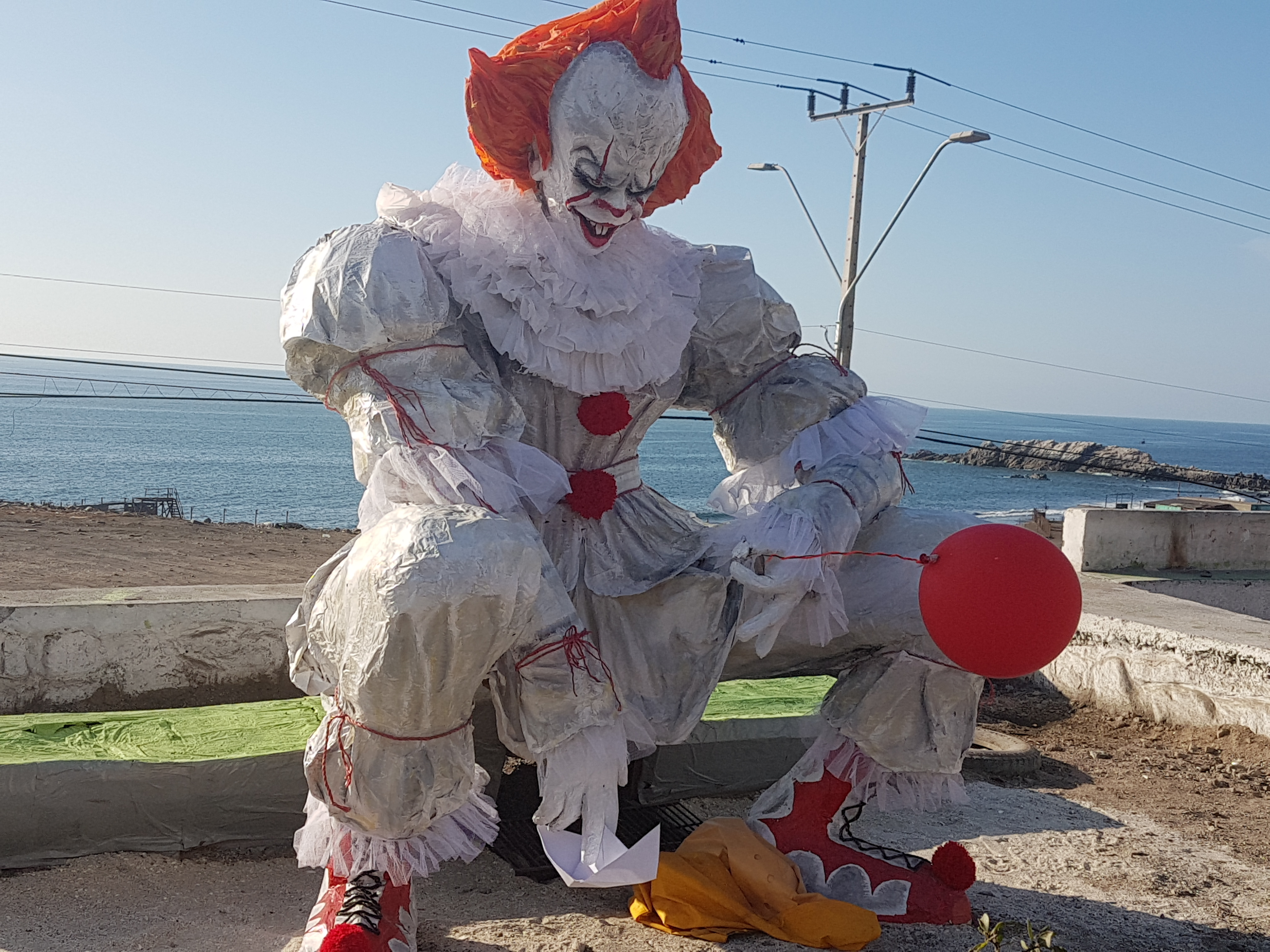
Pennywise the Dancing Clown, otherwise known as It, is the antagonist in Stephen King's 1986 novel It.

== See also ==
- Idlirvirissong
- Juggalos
- Motley
