= 2016 clown sightings =

Spate of alleged malevolent clown sightings

- Example of the Evil Clown Costume
- Date: 2016
- Location: Worldwide
- Also known as: "Killers" Clowns Attack

In 2016, there were reports of people disguised as evil clowns in incongruous settings, such as near forests, schools and neighborhoods. The incidents were reported in the United States, Canada, Australia, Ireland, New Zealand, the United Kingdom and subsequently in other countries and territories, starting in Green Bay, Wisconsin, on August 1, 2016, and continuing in other countries for the rest of August 2016. The Green Bay sighting was first reported on Facebook at around 2 AM local time and was later revealed to have been a marketing stunt for a horror film. The phenomenon later spread to many other cities in the United States. By mid-October 2016, clown sightings and attacks had been reported in nearly all U.S. states, nine out of 13 provinces and territories of Canada, and 18 other countries.

Prior to the spate of incidents in 2016, numerous sightings of people dressed as clowns in odd or incongruous settings had occurred throughout the world since 2013. The proliferation of videos and images of these precursor sightings spread through social media posts and viral sharing of the content.

== Scope, timeline and effects of sightings ==
=== Precursor sightings ===
One possible precursor event were the 2013 sightings of a "creepy clown" in Northampton, England. The Northampton clown sightings, which were in the town during September and October 2013, were the work of three local filmmakers: Alex Powell, Elliot Simpson, and Luke Ubanski. The clown resembled Pennywise from Stephen King's novel It. The trio started a Facebook page for the so-called "Northampton clown" and used the appearances to drive traffic to the page.

In March 2014, Matteo Moroni from Perugia, owner of the YouTube channel DM Pranks, began dressing as an evil clown and terrifying unsuspecting passersby; his videos accrued hundreds of millions of views. A rash of sightings appeared in California in October 2014, which centered upon the "Wasco clown", and primarily occurred in the Wasco, California area with photos appearing on social media.

A segment called "Why Are Clowns Scary?" was part of the 2014 documentary Killer Legends. The filmmakers traveled to Chicago to explore the previous clown panics that swept the city in 1991 and again in 2008, linking them to serial killer John Wayne Gacy and the stranger danger panic. It was around this time in 2014 that some of the first clown sightings appeared in the U.S., including early sightings in Staten Island, New York.

A person in clown attire was spotted in a cemetery in Chicago in July 2015. This occurrence involved two residents who spotted the "creepy clown" scaling the gate at the Rosehill Cemetery late at night. After the clown entered the cemetery, they turned to face the residents and began waving slowly as they made a video recording. After waving for a few seconds, the clown ran into a dark wooded area and was not seen again. Police investigation of the sighting did not lead to any arrests.

=== 2016 sightings and effects ===
On August 1, 2016, the clown phenomenon began in Green Bay, Wisconsin. Five pictures of a creepy clown roaming a vacant parking lot under a bridge in Downtown Green Bay at 2 AM local time. A Facebook page was created shortly after, claiming that the clown was named "Gags". In the days that followed, the pictures were discussed on numerous news outlets including Fox News and USA Today. Suspicions of the character being related to a horror film were confirmed when a Wisconsin filmmaker announced the pictures were a marketing stunt for a then-unreleased short film titled Gags. A feature film was produced based on the short film and premiered in 2018, with the film having a limited theatre run and releasing on VOD platforms in September 2019.

After the Wisconsin incident, numerous other incidents started popping up across the United States at the end of August 2016. According to The New York Times, reports began to surface of clown sightings in Greenville County, South Carolina in late August. In Greenville County, it was rumored that clowns were attempting to lure children into the woods with money or loitering around. Similarly, a clown was sighted in Winston-Salem, North Carolina offering treats to children; the clown fled when police arrived. In early October 2016, further incidents were reported in Canada and the first occurrences in the United Kingdom and Australia. British communities were described as "horrified" and pressure had been placed on police resources.

According to The New York Times, the clown sightings resulted in at least 12 arrests across the United States and one death. In Reading, Pennsylvania, a 16-year-old boy was fatally stabbed during an incident that could have been provoked by a prowler wearing a clown mask. The charges related to the sightings included making false reports, threats, and chasing people.

Throughout this time, Internet social media sites received numerous postings related to the phenomenon. The World Clown Association president Randy Christensen took a stance against the trend of people dressing up as clowns to frighten people. Circuses and other clown-related businesses were affected. In October 2016, McDonald's decided that Ronald McDonald would keep a lower profile as a result of the incidents. A sociologist has called 2016 "a bad time to be a professional clown". The killer clown craze was linked to a significant increase in sales of clown suits in and near Glasgow, Scotland. During Halloween, some Floridians decided to go armed while trick-or-treating.

By 25 October 2016, several news outlets reported on an alleged clown-initiated "purge" or "attack", which supposedly was to take place on Halloween Eve of 2016. While there were no widespread "purge" attacks as threatened, a family from Florida was attacked on 31 October 2016, by a group of approximately 20 people in clown masks (and masks styled after The Purge movie). No arrests were made.

=== Reactions ===
On 12 October, the Russian Embassy in London issued a warning to Russian and British citizens because of the clown scare. The next day, Fijian police warned people against involvement in the events.

Several New Zealand shops withdrew clown costumes from their shelves. In the United States, school districts in California, New Jersey, and Ohio issued a blanket ban on all clown costumes and clown masks in addition to previously existing policies and restrictions. Target pulled clown masks from its website and stores as a result of the scare, as did Canadian Tire. The village of Memramcook, New Brunswick asked residents not to dress up as clowns on Halloween. Employees of theme parks were instructed to remove any horror costumes and make-up before leaving work.

Students at Pennsylvania State University and Michigan State University were involved in mobs that searched for clowns on campus after reported sightings. Rumors of clown attacks floated around on campgrounds.

== Motive ==
It was suggested that Pennywise was a possible motive for two incidents of people dressing up as clowns in Northampton, England and Staten Island, New York, US, both in 2014. In 2016, appearances of "evil clowns" were reported by the media, including nine people in Alabama, US arrested on suspicion of "clown-related activity". Several newspaper articles suggested that the character of Pennywise was an influence, which led to author Stephen King commenting that people should react less hysterically to the sightings and not take his work seriously. One hypothesis for the wave of 2016 clown sightings was a viral marketing campaign for Andy Muschietti's 2017 It film. A spokesperson for New Line Cinema (the film's distributor) released a statement claiming that "New Line is absolutely not involved in the rash of clown sightings."

== See also ==
- Elvis sightings
- List of urban legends
- Mass hysteria
