= Idlirvirissong =

Evil spirit from the religion(s) of the Baffin Island and Greenlandic Inuit

Idlirvirissong, or Irdlirvirisissong, is an evil spirit in the religion of the Inuit of Baffin Island and the Greenlandic Inuit.

== Description ==
In most descriptions, Idlirvirissong is a female, though some give Idlirvirissong's gender as a male.

Idlirvirissong is a demonic, evil spirit usually depicted as a clown, with a nose "turned up on the side." She owns many dogs. Idlirvirissong lives in a house in the sky with her dogs, where she awaits the arrival of the newly deceased. When the deceased arrive, Idlirvirissong will dance while saying "Qimitiaka nexessaqtaqpaka" ("I am looking for food for my dogs"). Those who laugh at Idlirvirissong and her dance will have their bodies cut open, and their intestines placed on a Idlirvirissong's plate called qengmerping and be fed to the dogs. Those who do not laugh are spared.

Idlirvirissong is said to be the cousin of the spirit of the Sun, to whom she is opposed; in some versions, she is the cousin of the Moon spirit Aningan instead. In one version recounted by the Inuit of Smith Sound, Aningan warns people not to laugh around Idlirvirissong.

== Other versions ==
In other parts of Greenland, she is known as the Erdlaveersissok, the "entrail-seizer." In Baffin Island a similar figure known as Ululiernang or Ululiarnåq is present. Ululiernang has a hollow back with her entrails missing, and she offers the entrails she acquired to the moon's ermine. Explorer Knud Rasmussen recorded a story as told by Orulo, an Inuk woman from Admiralty Inlet on Baffin Island:

...all who go visiting the Moon must beware of another spirit which it is impossible to avoid meeting in the heavens. Some believe that this spirit lives with the Moon, others that it has its own house just close by. This spirit, which is a woman, is called Ululiarnåq ("the one with the ulo", a knife used by women) and her peculiarity is, that she is always trying to make people laugh. And if they do but smile, she will slit up their bellies and tear out the entrails. She wears a tunic that is too short for her, terminating in a pointed hood. She has tattooed her face in such odd patterns that one can hardly help laughing at that alone. The Moon Man does all he can to keep her out of his house, but nevertheless it happens sometimes that she finds an opportunity of throwing down her dish on the floor; a dish quite white at the bottom from the fat of entrails. And then she herself comes leaping in after it, dancing and hopping and twisting her body in all manner of ludicrous and sensual gestures and movements, ready to fall on any who smile, in a moment, and use her knife. So rapidly is it done, that a man's entrails are dumped down into the dish the very moment his face shows the faintest trace of a smile. Another thing which makes it more difficult to refrain is, that she has always about her a whole crowd of pale and shrunken men, who constantly burst out laughing at everything she does. These are victims whom she has already disembowelled, and who are anxious to see others suffer the same fate. Thus the Moon Man has his evil Ululiarnåq, just as the Sea Spirit has Isarrataitsoq and the Air Spirit has Oqaloraq. There is this difference, however, that the Moon Spirit always warns people against Ululiarnåq, and turns her out of his house when she tries to do harm, whereas the two other great spirits never hinder their satellites from doing evil to men. Therefore the Moon Spirit is in nearly all respects a kindly spirit, though even he can also be merciless.

== Bibliography ==
- Bane, Theresa (2016). Encyclopedia of Spirits and Ghosts in World Mythology. Jefferson, North Carolina: McFarland & Company, Inc., Publishers. ISBN 1-4766-6355-6. OCLC 918874340.
- Burland, Cottie Arthur (1996). North American Indian Mythology. New York: Barnes & Noble Books. p. 140. ISBN 978-0-7607-0194-2. OCLC 662685721.
- Dixon-Kennedy, Mike (1998). Native American Myth & Legend: An A-Z of People and Places. London: Brockhampton Press. ISBN 978-1-86019-839-7. OCLC 50267284.
- Jakobsen, Merete Demant (1999). Shamanism Traditional and Contemporary Approaches to the Mastery of Spirits and Healing. New York, NY: Berghahn Books, Incorporated. ISBN 978-1-78920-207-6. OCLC 1228034378.
- Kroeber, A. L. (1900). "The Eskimo of Smith Sound". Bulletin of the American Museum of Natural History. XII: 265–327.
- Rasmussen, Knud (1929). Report of the Fifth Thule Expedition, 1921-24; the Danish expedition to Arctic North America. Copenhagen: Gyldendalske Boghandel, Nordisk Forlag.
- Turner, Patricia; Coulter, Charles Russell, eds. (2013). Encyclopedia of Ancient Deities. New York: Taylor & Francis. ISBN 9781135963972.
