= Tommy Vlahopoulos =

American film producer (born 1979)

- Born: December 12, 1979 (age 46); Roslyn, New York, U.S.
- Occupation: Film producer
- Years active: 2015–present

Tommy Vlahopoulos (born December 12, 1979) is an American film producer. He is known for producing the 2015 film Intruders and the 2021 film Behind the Sightings. As of 2016, his company, Tommy V Productions, was slated to be the production studio for Intruders and Behind the Sightings, along with the planned films The Rake and Crawl To Me, an unreleased (as of 2024) film adaptation of the comic book miniseries of the same name.

== Filmography ==
=== As executive producer ===
- Intruders (2015)
- Behind the Sightings (2021)
