= DM Pranks =

YouTube channel created by Matteo Moroni

- Born: Matteo Moroni; June 25, 1987 (age 39); Castiglione del Lago, Italy
- Occupations: Prankster; creative director; filmmaker

YouTube information
- Channel: DM Pranks
- Years active: 2013–present
- Genres: Scare pranks; Comedies
- Subscribers: 4.61 million
- Views: 237 million
- Last updated: June 12, 2025

DM Pranks is an Italian YouTube channel created by Matteo Moroni. In 2013, he began to play pranks, and post videos on a channel on YouTube. As of May 2020, their channel has nearly 5 million subscribers and more than 215 million video views.

The YouTube channel is known for its "killer clown" character, which scares members of the public by running at them wielding hammers or chainsaws.

== Early life ==
Matteo Moroni was born in Castiglione del Lago, Italy on June 25, 1987, and moved to Magione where he was raised.

== YouTube career ==
In 2015 one of Moroni's external collaborators Diego Dolciami unfaithfully registered the "DM PRANKS" trademark. In January 2018 the federal district of California sentenced Dolciami for the use of the competing mark which constitutes trademark infringement and competing application was made in bad faith and constitutes fraud upon the USPTO.

=== Killer Clown ===
A video entitled "Killer Clown Scare Prank!", posted on May 11, 2014, and has over 52 million views, shows DM Pranks "pranking" a victim dousing the area around his car with what appears to be gasoline. In the same video a clown set up large bottles on a dummy's head that he filled with fake blood and then smashed with a large hammer to simulate a murder.

The video "Killer Clown Returns Scare Prank!" was posted on June 15, 2014, and has over 85 million views. It features a fake clown pranking passers by running after them with an iron hammer or a chainsaw.

On September 7, 2014, DM Pranks received the first significant success, with the video "Killer Clown 3 - The Uncle! Scare Prank!". A man dressed up as a clown scared random bystanders with a road roller. By September 2014 the "Killer Clown 3 - The Uncle! Scare Prank!" had been viewed more than 105 million times.

On November 16, 2014, DM Pranks filmed a prank entitled "Killer Clown 4 - Massacre! Scare Prank!", involving two clowns driving a car and then hitting a mannequin. In the video the clowns scared a man in a public toilet by setting up a fake chainsaw murder. The YouTube video now has over 62 million views.

=== Other characters ===
Other videos they have created include the "Devil's Daughter Scare Prank!", featuring a devil woman who scared people by screaming. The video was uploaded on August 3, 2014, and generated more than 34 million views.

Another one of DM Pranks's videos is titled "Telekinetic Priest Attack Scare Prank!". This video was posted on July 9, 2014, and has over 18 million views. It features a fake telekinetic priest going after people and making chairs and garbage move.

On March 17, 2014, DM Pranks pulled a prank called "Flamethrower Psycho Scare Prank" which involved a dark dressed man running after people with a flamethrower. The prank went viral receiving over 14 million views.
