= List of Canadian plays (A–F) =

Canadian plays online and in paper book form

Canadian plays have been written since the 19th century, both in English and in French. The present list comprises plays in English, some of which being translations from French Canadian plays. Full length and one act plays are included but not musicals.

The Playwrights Guild of Canada has a large list of titles of copyrighted plays, included in the present one, mostly their own publications or those of Playwrights Canada Press. The year of the playbook in the present list corresponds to the printed form, but when this information is unavailable, it corresponds to the first stage production. In rare cases, neither is available.

In addition to traditional forms, Canada has a vibrant non-traditional theatre scene with notable experimental, fringe, and other alternative forms, the largest fringe festival in North America being the Edmonton International Fringe Festival.

== A ==
- The Aberhart Summer by Conni Massing
- Abigail, or The Gold Medal by Patrick Young
- Abby's Place by Katherine Koller
- Abraham Lincoln Goes to the Theatre by Chantal Bilodeau translated by Larry Tremblay
- Act of Faith by Janet Munsil
- The Acting Principal by Malcolm Shiner
- Adam and Eve and After by Maurice Breslow
- Adrift by Marcus Youssef
- The Adventures of a Black Girl in Search of God by Djanet Sears
- The Adventures of the Black Girl in Her Search for God by Lisa Codrington
- The Adventures of Freddykid and Seagull Sam by Linda Hutsell-Manning
- The Affections of May by Norm Foster
- Afrika Solo by Djanet Sears
- After Baba's Funeral by Ted Galay
- After Marlene by Kevin Arthur Land
- After Wrestling by Bryce Hodgson and Charlie Kerr
- After You by Dave Carley
- The Aftermath by Lisa Codrington
- The Afternoon of the Big Game by Rex Deverell
- Agokwe by Waawaate Fobister
- Aimee! by Patrick Young
- Albertine in Five Times by Michel Tremblay
- Alias Godot by Brendan Gall
- Alice On Stage by Gordon Pengilly
- Alice: The Tea Party by Warren Graves
- Alien Creature: A Visitation from Gwendolyn MacEwen by Linda Griffiths
- Alien Love Connection by Ken Cameron
- Alien Mice by John Lazarus
- All Expenses Paid by David Belke
- All Fall Down by Wendy Lill
- Alli Alli Oh! by Margaret Hollingsworth
- Alma Victoria by Margaret Hollingsworth
- alterNatives by Drew Hayden Taylor
- Amazing Gracie by Warren Graves
- American Modern by Joanna McClelland Glass
- Ambushed by Karen Wikberg
- Amigo's Blue Guitar by Joan MacLeod
- And Freedom for All by Ed Schroeter
- Androgyne by Betty Jane Wylie
- And So It Goes by George F. Walker
- Angel by Betty Jane Wylie
- Angel Makers by Penn Kemp
- Angel Square by Alan R. Davis
- Angel's River by Andrea Boyd
- The Angelina Project by Frank Canino
- Angelique by Lorena Gale
- Anger Begets by Tina Silver
- An Anglophone is Coming to Dinner by George Rideout
- Anna Jameson by Pauline Carey
- Anne by Paul Ledoux
- Annie Mae's Movement by Yvette Nolan
- Anniversary by Carol Shields
- Anno Domini by Don Druick
- Anomaly by Neil Fleming
- Another Country by Guillermo Verdecchia
- Another Home Invasion by Joan MacLeod
- Another Season's Harvest by Anne Chislett
- Another Season's Promise by Anne Chislett
- Another Two Hander or Two by David Belke
- Aphra by Rose Scollard
- Apocalypse by Louis Patrick Leroux translated by Shelley Tepperman and Ellen Warkentin
- Apple by Vern Thiessen
- Apple Butter by James Reaney
- The Apple in the Eye by Margaret Hollingsworth
- Apple Tree Road by Daniel R. Lillford
- Are You Afraid of Thieves? by Louis-Dominique Lavigne translated by Henry Beissel
- Are You Evil Tonight by Daniel R. Lillford
- Arianna by Thomas Morgan Jones
- Arigato, Tokyo by Daniel MacIvor
- Armagideon by Sandra Dempsey
- Arnold Had Two Wives by Aviva Ravel
- Ars Poetica by Arthur Holden
- Art Attack by Kico Gonzalez-Risso
- Articles of Faith by Mark Leiren-Young
- Art is a Cupboard by Melissa Major
- As Loved Our Fathers by Thomas J. Cahill
- At My Heart's Core by Robertson Davies
- The Attic, the Pearls and Three Fine Girls by Ann-Marie MacDonald
- The Audition by Dan Daniels
- Audition Piece by Peter Anderson
- Augury: Trial, Tribulation and Triumph in the Life of Emily Stowe by Florence Gibson MacDonald
- Aunt Hannah Meets Joe River by Laurie Fyffe
- Avert Your Gays by Alex Tétreault

== B ==
- Babel Rap by John Lazarus
- Babe Ruth Comes to Pickle River by Nelles Van Loon
- Babies by Ramona Baillie
- The Baby Blues by Drew Hayden Taylor
- Backstreets by Vittorio Rossi
- Back to Beulah by W.O. Mitchell
- Back up and Push: Confessions of a Reformed Cynic by Ted Johns
- Back to Berlin by Vern Thiessen
- Bad Acting Teachers by Sky Gilbert
- Balconville by David Fennario
- Ballad for a Rumrunner's Daughter by Laurie Fyffe
- The Ballad of Weedy Peetstraw by Peter Anderson
- Banana Boots by David Fennario
- Ban This Show by Sky Gilbert
- The Barber of Seville! by Michael O'Brien
- Barnboozled: He Won't Come in From the Barn, Part II by Ted Johns
- Barnardo Kids! by Janice Wiseman
- Basically Good Kids by Mark Leiren-Young
- Be Still by Janet Munsil
- Bearded Circus Ladies by Jan Derbyshire
- Bears by Matthew MacKenzie
- Beat the Sunset by Michael MacLennan
- BeatDown by Joseph Jomo Pierre
- Beautiful Houses by Aviva Ravel
- Beautiful Lake Winnipeg by Maureen Hunter
- A Beautiful View by Daniel MacIvor
- Becoming Sharp by David Belke
- Bed and Breakfast by Mark Crawford
- Bedtime Stories by Norm Foster
- Bedtimes and Bullies by Dennis Foon
- Beginning by Maurice Breslow
- Behind the Yellow Door by Flora Stohr-Danziger
- Bella Donna by David Copelin
- Belonging by Rex Deverell
- Be My Friend by Aviva Ravel
- Ben and the Boxes by Cherie Thiessen
- Benefit of the Doubt by Emil Sher
- Benevolence by Morris Panych
- The Berlin Blues by Drew Hayden Taylor
- Beautiful Lady, Tell Me... by Shirley Barrie
- Beautiful City by George F. Walker
- Beauty and the Beast by Gail Bowen
- Beauty and the Beast by Warren Graves
- Belle by Florence Gibson MacDonald
- Belle Moral by Ann-Marie MacDonald
- Belle-Scene by Florence Gibson MacDonald
- Les Belles-soeurs by Michel Tremblay (produced in Scotland as The Guid-Sisters)
- Bellies, Knees and Ankles by W. A. Hamilton
- Benevolence by Morris Panych
- Beowulf by Betty Jane Wylie
- Beside Myself by Jennifer Wynne Webber
- Berthe by Michel Tremblay
- Bete Blanche by Rose Scollard
- The Betrothal by Elizabeth Dancoes
- Better Living by George F. Walker
- Between the Sheets by Jordi Mand
- Between Friends by John Spurway
- Between Then and Now by Harry Rintoul
- Between Yourself and Me by David Belke
- Bewitched by Them to Death by Robert Lalonde
- Beyond Batoche by Rex Deverell
- Beyond Belief by Irene N. Watts
- Beyond the End of Your Nose by Julie Salverson and Patricia Henderson
- Beyond Escape by Beth McMaster
- Bhopal by Rahul Varma
- The Bicycle Eater by Larry Tremblay
- Big Box by Dave Carley
- big face by Marion de Vries
- The Big Hit by Hrant Alianak
- The Big League by James Durham
- The Big Leap by Leo Orenstein
- Billy Bishop and The Red Baron by Len Peterson
- Billy Bishop Goes to War by John MacLachlan Gray with Eric Peterson
- Binti's Journey by Marcia Johnson
- The Bird Prince by James DeFelice
- The Birds and the Bees by Mark Crawford
- Bitter Rose by Catherine Banks
- The Black Bonspiel of Wullie Maccrimmon by W.O. Mitchell
- Black Friday by Alec Butler
- Black Powder (Estevan, 1931) by Rex Deverell
- Black Silence by Michael Melski
- Black to Black by Greg Light
- Blackpool & Parrish by David Belke
- Blade by Yvette Nolan
- Blake & Clay's Gay Agenda by Curtis Campbell and Daniel Krolik
- The Bleeding Heart of Wee John by John Gounod Campbell
- Blessings in Disguise by Douglas Beattie
- Bless You, Billy Wilder by David Belke
- Blind Spot by Meghan Gardiner
- Blind Dates by Anna Fuerstenberg
- The Blind Hunter by Irene N. Watts
- A Blizzard Leaves No Footprints by Irene N. Watts
- Blonde Tulips by Donn Short
- bloom by Guillermo Verdecchia
- The Blue Horse by Peter Anderson
- Blueprints from Space by Mark Leiren-Young
- Bluffer's Moon by Christine Foster
- Blue Light by Mieko Ouchi
- The Blues by Hrant Alianak
- The Blood is Strong by Lister Sinclair
- Blood on the Moon by Pierre Brault
- Blood Relations by Sharon Pollock
- The Bloody Banquet by Robert Lalonde
- Bloody Business by Ian Weir
- Blowfish by Vern Thiessen
- Blue Dragons by Gordon Armstrong
- The Body Image Project by Eleanor Albanese
- Body Politic by Nick Green
- Body So Fluorescent by Amanda Cordner and David Di Giovanni
- Boiler Room Suite by Rex Deverell
- Bolshevik by David Fennario
- The Bone House by Marty Chan
- Bonjour, Là, Bonjour by Michel Tremblay
- Boiler Room Suite by Rex Deverell
- Bone Cage by Catherine Banks
- Bongo From the Congo by John MacLachlan Gray
- The Book of Esther by Leanna Brodie
- Boom (Salverson and Fraser play) by Julie Salverson and Patti Fraser
- The Bootblack Orator: An Illustrated Lecture From 1886 by Ted Johns
- Bootlegger Blues by Drew Hayden Taylor
- Borderline by Robert Fothergill
- Bordertown Cafe by Kelly Rebar
- Born Ready by Joseph Jomo Pierre
- Bound: A Study in Justice by Laurent Goulet
- Boy in a Cage by Betty Jane Wylie
- The Boy in the Treehouse by Drew Hayden Taylor
- BOYS by Paul Dunn
- Boys, Girls and Other Mythological Creatures by Mark Crawford
- Bradley Bradley and the Octopus by Beth McMaster
- Brainiac by Daniel Libman
- Brandy by Hrant Alianak
- Bravado by Norm Foster
- Brave Hearts by Harry Rintoul
- Bright Blue Future by Sean Harris Oliver
- Brothel#9 by Anusree Roy
- Brownie Points by Nicolle Trixie Nattrass
- Brightest Red to Blue by Graham Percy
- Brigid Bonfast: Space Scientist by Shirley Barrie
- Brooks! by Rex Deverell
- Buffalo Jump by Carol Bolt
- Building Jerusalem by Michael Redhill
- Bull by the Horns by Peter Anderson
- Burglaries In Progress by Laurent Goulet
- Burlap Bags by Len Peterson
- Burn Gloom: Rituals on Millennium Eve by Elaine Avila
- Burnt Remains by Scott Sharplin
- Bushed by Margaret Hollingsworth
- Burning Vision by Marie Clements
- Buckskin & Chapperos by Paddy Campbell
- Bush Fire by Laurie Fyffe
- Butler's Marsh by Robert Chafe
- The Buz'Gem Blues by Drew Hayden Taylor

== C ==
- The Cabbage Patch by Daniel R. Lillford
- Cabbagetown Crisis by Beth McMaster
- The Cancer Club by Donn Short
- Caffé by Bruce McManus
- Calenture by Bruce McManus
- Calpurnia by Audrey Dwyer
- Canadien Content by Mark Leiren-Young
- Canadian Gothic by Joanna McClelland Glass
- The Canvas Barricade by Donald Jack
- Capote at Yadoo by Sky Gilbert
- The Captive Moon by Irene N. Watts
- Capture Me by Judith Thompson
- Cariboo Magi by Lucia Frangione
- Carol's Christmas by Kathleen Oliver
- Un carré de ciel by Michèle Magny
- Carried Away on the Crest of a Wave by David Yee
- Carrying the Calf by Shirley Barrie
- Cast Iron by Lisa Codrington
- Cat's Cradle by Beth McMaster
- The Cattle Pen by Douglas Abel
- Can You See Me Yet? by Timothy Findley
- Cassie by Heldor Schäfer
- Cavies by David L. Young
- Cecil and Cleopaytra by Daniel Libman
- A Celibate Season by Carol Shields
- Cesare and Lucrezia Borgia by Robert Lalonde
- A Chain of Words by Irene N. Watts
- Chagall by Rick McNair
- Chairs and Tables by Rachel Wyatt
- Champlain by John Murdoch Harper
- Chants by Kevin Arthur Land
- Chaplin: The Trial of Charles Spencer Chaplin, Esq. by Simon Bradbury
- Chasin' Broadway Flo by Paul Ledoux
- Chasing Champions by Jacob Sampson
- Chasing the Money by Dennis Foon
- Cheatin' Hearts by Paul Ledoux
- Checkin' out by Kelly Rebar
- Chester, You Owe My Bird An Apology by John Lazarus
- Chew the Blade by Jaan Kolk
- Chief Shaking Spear Rides Again by Warren Graves
- Child by Yvette Nolan
- The Child by Keith Dorland
- Children of the Night by Gabriel Emanuel
- The Children of the Night by Paul Ledoux
- Chimera by Wendy Lill
- China Doll by Marjorie Chan
- Chickens by Lucia Frangione
- Chinook by Paddy Campbell
- Choke My Heart by Celia McBride
- The Chosen by Rose Scollard
- Christmas Cards by Beth McMaster
- Interface by Greg Nelson
- A Christmas Carol by Jeff Pitcher
- A Christmas Carol by Michael Shamata
- Cipangu: The Tale of Columbus by Richard Epp
- Circo by Pierre Bokor
- Circus Fire by Janet Munsil
- Climate of the Times by Alf Silver
- Closing Time by Daniel Libman
- Clouds of Glory by Betty Lambert
- Clue in the Fast Lane by Beverley Cooper
- Clue in the Fast Lane by Ann-Marie MacDonald
- Choices by Shirley Barrie
- Christmas by Hrant Alianak
- A Christmas Carol by Irene N. Watts
- Chronic by Linda Griffiths
- Closure by Ron Blicq
- Club Dead by Thom Bennett
- Cocktails at Pam's by Stewart Lemoine
- Cocktails for Two Hundred by James Saar
- Cold Comfort by Jim Garrard
- Cold Meat Party by Brad Fraser
- The Colony of Unrequited Dreams by Robert Chafe
- Colour the Flesh the Colour of Dust by Michael Cook
- Colours in the Dark by James Reaney
- Coming Around by Paula Wing
- A Common Man's Guide to Loving Women by Andrew Moodie
- Commonwealth Games by Margaret Hollingsworth
- Communion by Daniel MacIvor
- Compleat Byron by Tom Hendry
- Concord Floral by Jordan Tannahill
- The Confession by Keith Dorland
- Conflict and Triumph by Elizabeth Gagnieur
- Connie in Egypt by Stewart Lemoine
- Contents Under Pressure by David King
- Contraption by Gordon Pengilly
- Conversations with My Neighbour's Pit Bull by Clem Martini
- The Cookie War by Kathleen McDonnell
- Copper Thunderbird by Marie Clements
- Corker by Wendy Lill
- The Corner of Scarth and Eleventh by Rex Deverell
- The Coronation Voyage by Michel Marc Bouchard
- Corpus Delectable by Munroe Scott
- The Cost of Living by Morris Panych
- Cote Saint Joe by Daniel Libman
- A Cottage Week-end by Malcolm Shiner
- Counter Offenceby Rahul Varma
- Country Chorale by Raymond Storey
- Country Hearts: A Country and Western Musical by Ted Johns
- Couples by David Edney
- The Courier by Vern Thiessen
- Courting Johanna by Marcia Johnson
- The Courting of Sally Schwartz by Aviva Ravel
- Cowboy Boots and a Corsage by Katherine Koller
- Cowboy Island by Brian Shein
- The Coyotes by Peter Anderson
- The Coyotes' Christmas by Peter Anderson
- Crabdance by Beverley Simons
- Crackpot by Rachel Wyatt
- The Crackwalker by Judith Thompson
- Cranked by Michael P. Northey
- Crash by Pamela Mala Sinha
- Crater by Sky Gilbert
- Creation by Peter Anderson
- Creeps by David Freeman
- Cricket and Claudette by Ted Johns
- Criminal by Elizabeth Dancoes
- Criminals in Love by George F. Walker
- Crippled by Paul David Power
- A Critical Stranger by Daniel R. Lillford
- Curator's Park by Benj Gallander
- The Curve by Henry Beissel
- El Crocodor by Peter Anderson
- Crossing by C. E. Gatchalian
- Cruel Tears by Ken Mitchell
- The Cuckoo Song by Heldor Schäfer
- Culture Shock by Chris Lorne Elliott
- Curtsy by Brian Drader
- Cyclone Jack by Carol Bolt

== D ==
- The Dada Show by Paul Ledoux
- Damnee Manon, Sacree Sandra by Michel Tremblay
- A Damsel for a Gorilla by Don Druick
- Danceland by Glen Cairns
- Dance Like A Butterfly by Aviva Ravel
- Dancing in the Garden...Like Momma by Elizabeth Dancoes
- Dancing in Poppies by Gail Bowen and Ron Marken
- Dancock's Dance by Guy Vanderhaeghe
- D'arcy by Sandra Dempsey
- Dark Ages Romance by Benj Gallander and Guy Petzall
- Dark Heart by Daniel R. Lillford
- Dark Rituals by Thom Bennett
- Dark Song by Robin Fulford
- The Darling Family by Linda Griffiths
- David For Queen by John Lazarus
- A Day at the Beach by John Palmer
- Dead Peasants by Leif Oleson-Cormack
- Dead Together by George Rideout
- Dead White Writer on the Floor by Drew Hayden Taylor
- Dear Santa by Norm Foster
- The Death of the Donnellys: A Study in Law by Ted Johns
- The Death of Dracula by Warren Graves
- The Death of Me by Christine Foster
- Death Chart by Beth McMaster
- Death of Parent God by Benj Gallander
- The Death of René Levesque by David Fennario
- Declarations by Jordan Tannahill
- Degrees by Josh Macdonald
- Democracy by John Murrell
- Demons of the Mind by Talia Pura
- Denial is a River by Emil Sher
- Departures and Arrivals by Carol Shields
- Derailed by Emil Sher
- De Roberval by John Hunter-Duvar
- The Dershowitz Protocol by Robert Fothergill
- The Destruction of Eve by Svetlana Zylin
- Detaining Mr. Trotsky by Robert Fothergill
- The Devil's Petition by Munroe Scott
- Diamond by C. E. Gatchalian
- Dim Sum Diaries by Mark Leiren-Young
- Dinosaur by Rick McNair
- Diplomacy by Tim Carlson
- The Dirt Eaters by Dennis Foon
- The Dishwashers by Morris Panych
- The Dissociates by Dorothy Dittrich
- District of Centuries by Sean Dixon
- Diving by Margaret Hollingsworth
- Divinity Bash by Bryden MacDonald
- Djuna: What of the Night? by Svetlana Zylin
- Doc by Sharon Pollock
- Dock Mother God Society by Bryce Hodgson
- Doctor Thomas Neill Cream by David Fennario
- The Dollar Woman by Aldan Nowland and Walter Learning
- Dolorsolatio by Sam Scribble
- Don Messer's Jubilee by John Gray
- Donne In by Yvette Nolan
- The Donnellys by Peter Colley
- Don't Fence Me In by Rose Scollard
- Don't Just Stand There - Jiggle! by Betty Jane Wylie
- Don't Talk to Me of Love by Pauline Carey
- Don Quixote by Peter Anderson
- Don Quixote by Colin Heath
- The Donnellys by James Reaney
- Donut City by Douglas Rodger
- Do The Baby Last by Rose Scollard
- Double Vision by Betty Jane Wylie
- Doukhobors by Paul Thompson
- Down Dangerous Passes Road by Michel Marc Bouchard
- Down from Heaven by Colleen Wagner
- Down for the Weekend by Frank Moher
- Dracula by Talia Pura
- Dracula by Michael Shamata
- The Dragon's Pearl by Betty Quan
- Drag Queens in Outer Space by Sky Gilbert
- Drag Queens on Trial by Sky Gilbert
- Drama in the Classroom by Carol Bolt
- The Drawer Boy by Michael Healey
- Dr. Barnardo's Pioneers by Rick McNair
- The Dreadful Drofulless by Laurent Goulet
- A Dream Without Bottom by David Belke
- Dreaming and Duelling by John Lazarus
- The Dreamland by Raymond Storey
- Dreamland Saturday Nights by David Belke
- Dreamspyre by Sara Graefe
- The Dressing Gown by Sky Gilbert
- Drift by Rex Deverell
- Drinking Alone by Norm Foster
- The Driving Force by Michel Tremblay
- Dropping Ballast by Heldor Schäfer
- The Drowning Girls by Beth Graham
- Drumheller or Dangerous Times by Gordon Pengilly
- Dry Lips Oughta Move to Kapuskasing by Tomson Highway
- La Duchesse de Langeais by Michel Tremblay
- The Dunny by Daniel R. Lillford
- The Dunsmoors: a promise kept by Rod Langley
- The Duplex by Jaan Kolk

== E ==
- The Early Worm Club by Katherine Koller
- Earshot by Morris Panych
- Earth, Fire and Water by Irene N. Watts
- Easing the Living by Laurent Goulet
- Easy Avenue by Alan R. Davis
- Easy Money by Mark Leiren-Young
- Eclipsed by Colleen Wagner
- The Ecstasy of Rita Joe by George Ryga
- eddycandyside by Robin Fulford
- Ed & Ed Do Florida by Jeff Pitcher
- Ed & Ed (The Fisherman's Trap) by Jeff Pitcher
- Ed & Ed Go to Jail (The Sequel) by Jeff Pitcher
- Ed & Ed - Trapped! by Jeff Pitcher
- The Edible Woman by Dave Carley
- Education is Our Right by Drew Hayden Taylor
- Egomaniac by Kico Gonzalez-Risso
- Eight Men Speak by members of the Canadian Workers' Theatre(Oscar Ryan, E. Cecil-Smith, Frank Love and Mildred Goldberg)
- 18 Wheels by John Gray
- Einstein by Gabriel Emanuel
- Einstein's Gift by Vern Thiessen
- Eldorado Town by Charles Hayter
- The Electrical Man by Paul Ledoux
- Elevator by Cherie Thiessen
- Elizabeth Rex by Timothy Findley
- The Elephant Song by Nicolas Billon
- Elevator by Florence Gibson MacDonald
- Elisa's Skin by Carole Fréchette
- The Elfin Knight by Christine Foster
- The Elixir by James DeFelice
- Elvis & Mavis by Jeff Pitcher
- Embedded by Louis Patrick Leroux translated by Shelley Tepperman and Ellen Warkentin
- The Emotionalists by Sky Gilbert
- The Emperor's New Threads by Peter Anderson
- Emphysema (A Love Story) by Janet Munsil
- Emptygirl by Robert Chafe
- The Enamorado by John Hunter-Duvar
- The Enchanted Spring by Irene N. Watts
- Encounter by Aviva Ravel
- The End by John Palmer
- The End of the World Romance by Sean Dixon
- The Ends of the Earth by Morris Panych
- Enemy Graces by Sharon Stearns
- An Enemy of the People by Betty Jane Wylie
- Enigma by Sandra Dempsey
- En Pièces Détachées by Michel Tremblay
- Entertainment at the Cafe Terminus by Brian Shein
- The Envelope by Vittorio Rossi
- The Epic of Toad and Heron by Penn Kemp
- Ernestine Shuswap Gets Her Trout by Tomson Highway
- Eros at Breakfast by Robertson Davies
- Escape Entertainment by Carol Bolt
- Escape From Fantasy Gardens by Mark Leiren-Young
- Escape from Happiness by George F. Walker
- Esker Mike and His Wife, Agiluk by Herschel Hardin
- Espresso by Lucia Frangione
- Essential Conflict by Norma Harrs
- Esther by Eliza Lanesford Cushing
- Ethan Claymore by Norm Foster
- Evelyn Strange by Stewart Lemoine
- Even Burning by Melissa Major
- Ever Loving by Margaret Hollingsworth
- Everybody's Business by Yvette Nolan
- Everyone's Death by Robert Lalonde
- Everything But Anchovies by Christine Foster
- The Execution by Marie-Claire Blais
- The Executioner by Dan Daniels
- Exile by Archie Crail
- Exit, Pursued by Bard by David Belke
- EXITstential by Melissa Major
- The Extroverted Suicide by Cherie Thiessen
- Eye of the Storm by Len Peterson
- The Eyes of Heaven by Beverley Cooper

== F ==
- Fables by Jackie Torrens
- Fair Game by Karen Wikberg
- The Fair Grit by Nicholas Flood Davin
- The Fairies are Thirsty by Denise Boucher
- Faithless by Yvette Nolan
- The Fall by Greg Nelson
- Fall in Paris by Scott Burke
- Falling: A Wake by Gary Kirkham
- Falling Back Home by Sean Dixon
- Falling Out of Place by Sharon Stearns
- Fallout by Rex Deverell
- A Family Seder by Aviva Ravel
- The Family Way by Kathleen Oliver
- Famous by Carol Bolt
- The Faraway Nearby by John Murrell
- fareWel by Ian Ross
- The Farm Show by Ted Johns and Paul Thompson
- Fashion, Power, Guilt and the Charity of Families by Carol Shields
- Father Land by Arthur Holden
- Fever Dream by Anna Fuerstenberg
- The Female Consistory of Brockville by Caroli Candidus
- Ferry Terminal by Bo Anderson
- The Field by Clem Martini
- A Field of Flowers by Laurie Fyffe
- 15 Seconds by François Archambault
- Fifteen Miles of Broken Glass by Tom Hendry
- The Fighting Days by Wendy Lill
- Fighting Fear at the Bus Stop by John Lazarus
- The Fighting Season by Sean Harris Oliver
- The File by Greg Nelson
- Final Decisions/War by Guillermo Verdecchia
- The Final Hour by Dave Carley
- Finding Bumble by Carol Bolt
- Finger of Fate by Tom Hendry
- Fire by Paul Ledoux
- Fire by David S. Young
- Fire in the Stable by Ed Schroeter
- Firebird by Rose Scollard
- The Firebird: A Saga of Sorcery and Fate by Christine Foster
- The First Métis Man of Odesa by Matthew MacKenzie and Mariya Khomutova
- Fishing for Frank by Daniel R. Lillford
- Five Fingers by Robin Fulford
- The Five Vengeances by Jovanni Sy
- Flight of the Living Dog by Greg Nelson
- Flippin' In by Anne Chislett
- Flowers by Deborah Porter Taylor
- The Fly Fisher's Companion by Michael Melski
- Flying to Glory by Sandra Dempsey
- Follow the Leader by Carol Libman
- Fool's Angel by Kim Selody
- A Foolish Boy by Beth Graham
- Fools and Masters by James DeFelice
- Footprints on the Moon by Maureen Hunter
- For Art's Sake by Colin Heath
- For Home and Country by Leanna Brodie
- For Love and Money by Rachel Wyatt
- The Fool's Whistle by Christine Foster
- Forever Yours, Marie-Lou by Michel Tremblay
- For the Pleasure of Seeing Her Again by Michel Tremblay
- For This Moment Alone by Marcia Kash
- Forget About Tomorrow by Jill Daum
- Fortune and Men's Eyes by John Herbert
- Fortune, My Foe by Robertson Davies
- 400 Kilometres by Drew Hayden Taylor
- The 40th Birthday Party by Norma Harrs
- The Four Lives of Marie by Carole Fréchette
- The Foursome by Norm Foster
- Fox of a Thousand Faces by John Gounod Campbell
- Francis de Sales by Robert Lalonde
- The Frank Slide - One Hundred Seconds by Rick McNair
- Freaky Jane Fine Takes on the Serious World by Jan Derbyshire
- French Chronicles of the 1590s by Robert Lalonde
- Free's Point by Philip Adams
- Freeze by Stephen Orlov
- A Friend is a Friend by Rene Aloma
- The Frog Prince by Nelles Van Loon
- Fronteras Americanas by Guillermo Verdecchia
- The Fruit Machine by Brian Drader
- Full Frontal Diva by Donn Short

== See also ==
- List of Canadian playwrights
- Theatre of Canada
- Canadian Stage production history
