= List of Canadian plays (P–Z) =

Canadian plays online and in paper book form

Canadian plays have been written since the 19th century, both in English and in French. The present list comprises plays in English, some of which being translations from French Canadian plays. Full length and one act plays are included but not musicals.

The Playwrights Guild of Canada has a large list of titles of copyrighted plays, included in the present one, mostly their own publications or those of Playwrights Canada Press. The year of the playbook in the present list corresponds to the printed form, but when this information is unavailable, it corresponds to the first stage production. In rare cases, neither is available.

In addition to traditional forms, Canada has a vibrant non-traditional theatre scene with notable experimental, fringe, and other alternative forms, the largest fringe festival in North America being the Edmonton International Fringe Festival.

== P ==
- Pageant by Daniel Macdonald
- The Painting by Sean Dixon
- Palace of the end by Judith Thompson
- Pals by Seymour Blicker
- Panhandled by Brendan Gall
- Paolilni/Pelosi, or the God in the Unknown Flesh: A Theatrical inquiry into the Murder of Filmmaker Pier Paolo Pasolini by Sky Gilbert
- The Paper Bag Princess and Other Stories by Robert Munsch by Irene N. Watts
- Paradise by the River by Vittorio Rossi
- Paradise Express by Laurie Fyffe
- Paradise Garden by Lucia Frangione
- The Parallax Garden by Paddy Campbell
- The Park by Geoffrey Ursell
- A Particular Class of Women by Janet Feindel
- The Party by Irene N. Watts
- A Party to Murder by Douglas E. Hughes and Marcia Kash
- Passages by Peter Cureton
- Passion by Peter Anderson
- The Passion by Laurie Fyffe
- Passion and Sin by Hrant Alianak
- Past Imperfect by Emil Sher
- Patches by Irene N. Watts
- The Patron Saint of Stanley Park by Hiro Kanagawa
- Pauline by Pauline Carey
- Pauline Johnson by Pauline Carey
- Pauline the Travelling Poet by Pauline Carey
- Peace and Plenty by Lib Spry
- Peaches and Cream by Keith Dorland
- The Pebbled Shore by Michael Shepherd
- Penelope, The Impostor by Sara Barker
- Perfect Pie by Judith Thompson
- The Perils of Persephone by Dan Needles
- The Perlious Pirate's Daughter by Anne Chislett
- A Permanent Solution... by Tom Slater
- Personal Convictions by Viviene Laxdal
- Peter Pan by Jeff Pitcher
- Philip the Second by Henry Bliss (Canadian writer)
- The Photographic Moment by Mary Humphrey Baldridge
- The Pied Piper by Dorothy Lees-Blakey
- The Piano Teacher: A Healing Key by Dorothy Dittrich
- The Pied Piper of Hamelin by Irene N. Watts
- The Pied Piper Returns by Julie Salverson
- Piercing by Larry Tremblay
- Pig Girl by Colleen Murphy
- The Pig War by Suzanne Finlay
- Pink by Judith Thompson
- Pinocchio by Maurice Breslow
- Pinocchio by Eleanor Albanese
- Pinocchio by Ernest J. Schwarz
- A Place on Earth by Betty Jane Wylie
- Plague of the Gorgeous by Gordon Armstrong
- The Play is the Thing, Tra-La! by John Gounod Campbell
- Play Memory by Joanna McClelland Glass
- Play Murder by Sky Gilbert
- Playing Bare by Dominic Champagne translated by Shelley Tepperman
- Poinsettias by Laurent Goulet
- Please... Not in the Nude! by Dorothy Lees-Blakey and Brian Blakey
- Pleasure & Pain by Chantal Bilodeau
- Pogey Papers by Tom MacGregor
- Pogie by Chris Heide and Al Macdonald
- Poor Super Man by Brad Fraser
- Poor Uncle Ernie in his Covered Cage by Maureen Hunter
- Poppycock by Margaret Hollingsworth
- Possessions by Kevin Arthur Land
- Possible Worlds by John Mighton
- The Postman Rings Once by Sky Gilbert
- The Power of Invention by David Demchuk
- The Power of One by Eleanor Albanese
- Preschool by David L. Young
- Pride and Prejudice by Dorothy Lees-Blakey
- Primal Broads by Jane Gilchrist
- Prim and Duck, Mama and Frank by Margaret Hollingsworth
- Primrose School District 109 by Ted Galay
- A Princess Never Should by Lib Spry
- The Prisoner of Zenda by Thom Bennett and Elizabeth Ferns
- The Prisoner of Zenda by Warren Graves
- PROK by Brian Drader
- Prom Night of the Living Dead by Brad Fraser
- The Proper Perspective by Warren Graves
- A Proposal by Aviva Ravel
- Pseudopod Rejects by Benj Gallander and Guy Petzall
- The Psychiatrist: A Lecture on 'Bridge' by Aviva Ravel
- Psychic Driving by Beverley Cooper
- La P'tite Miss Easter Seals by Lina Chartrand
- Public Lies by Robert Fothergill
- Punch and Polly by Rick McNair
- Punch Up by Kat Sandler
- Puppet Play by Bo Anderson
- Puppets by John Lazarus
- Pusha-Man by Joseph Jomo Pierre
- Pushkin by George Jonas
- Put on the Spot by Beth McMaster
- Put Up Your Hand! by Norm Reynolds
- Pyaasa (play) by Anusree Roy

== Q ==
- Quartet for Three Actors by Rex Deverell
- Queen Lear by Eugene Stickland
- The Queen of Queen Street by Maureen Hunter
- Queen Mill of Galt by Gary Kirkham
- Queenie O'Leary by Suzanne Finlay
- The Queens by Normand Chaurette translated by Linda Gaboriau
- Que Pasa with la Raza, eh? by Carmen Aguirre
- Quiche My What! by Vince Grittani
- Quiet! I'm Talking by Vince Grittani
- Quiet in the Land by Anne Chislett
- A Quiet Place by Brendan Gall
- Quiet Please, There's A Lady On Stage by Margaret Matulic
- Quiller by Michael Cook
- Quite Contrary by David Copelin

== R ==
- Radio Daze by Joao Canhoto
- Raft Baby by Dennis Foon
- Rag Doll by Paul Ledoux
- The Rainmaker by Gwen Pharis Ringwood
- The Rainstone by Irene N. Watts
- Raptures by Christine Foster
- A Rare Day in June by Carol Libman
- Ratamacue by Jane Gilchrist
- Rattle in The Dash by Peter Anderson
- Rave by Kevin Arthur Land
- Real Live Girl by Damien Atkins
- The Real McCoy by Andrew Moodie
- The Real Sleeping Beauty by Sara Barker
- The Real World? by Michel Tremblay
- A Reason to Live by Mark Melymick
- Red by Jordan Hall
- Red Emma by Carol Bolt
- The Red King's Dream by David Belke
- The Red Priest by Mieko Ouchi
- Red Snow by Diana Tso
- Redpatch by Sean Harris Oliver and Raes Calvert
- Reflections by Shirley Barrie
- Reflections by Tom Slater
- The Refugee Hotel by Carmen Aguirre
- Refugees by Harry Rintoul
- Relative Strangers by Marilyn Boyle
- Relative Strangers by James W. Nichol
- The Reluctant Resurrection of Sherlock Holmes by David Belke
- The Remaindered Mr. Verboten by Laurent Goulet
- Remember Me by Michel Tremblay
- Remember Me by Irene N. Watts
- Resurrection by Louis Patrick Leroux translated by Shelley Tepperman and Ellen Warkentin
- Return to Wonderland by Thom Bennett
- Revelation by Shirley Barrie
- Reverend Jonah by Paul Ciufo
- Revolutions by Cherie Thiessen
- Rex Morgan, M.D. by Brian Shein
- The Rez Sisters by Tomson Highway
- Rice Boy by Sunil Kuruvilla
- Rice Rockets & Yacht People by Simon Johnston
- The Riddle of the World by David French
- Riders of the Apocalypse (the reunion tour) by David Belke
- Riders of the Sea by Shirley Barrie
- The Riel Commission by Rex Deverell and Wayne Schmaltz
- Righteousness by Rex Deverell
- Ring Around a Murder by Jack Sheriff
- Riot by Andrew Moodie
- Robena's Rose-Coloured Glasses by Beth McMaster
- Robinson Crusoe by Colin Heath
- Rock and Roll by John Gray
- The Rock and the Hard Place by Suzanne Finlay
- Role Call by Meghan Gardiner
- Rosalie Sings Alone by David Demchuk
- Rose by Tomson Highway
- Roshni by Anusree Roy
- Rough Magic by John Lazarus
- Round the Bend by Alan R. Davis
- Roundup by Barbara Sapergia
- Rootless but Green Are the Boulevard Trees by Uma Parameswaran
- Rope Enough by Sky Gilbert
- Rope's End by Douglas Bowie
- Rosie Learns French by Carol Bolt
- Roswell by Bruce Barton
- Rubber Dolly by Don Hannah
- Ruby and the Rock by Viviene Laxdal
- The Rum Runners of Rainbow Ravine by Geoffrey Ursell
- A Runaway Couple by W.A. Tremayne
- Running Dog, Paper Tiger by Simon Johnston
- The Running of the Deer by Geoffrey Ursell

== S ==
- Sacred Hearts by Colleen Curran.
- Sadie Flynn Comes to Big Oak by Norm Foster
- Sadly as I Tie My Shoes by Sara Graefe
- The Saga of the Steamer Atlantic by Simon Johnston
- The Saga of Tom Three Persons by Gordon Pengilly
- Saga of the Wet Hens by Jovette Marchessault translated by Linda Gaboriau
- Sahel by Franco Catanzariti
- Saint Frances of Hollywood by Sally Clark
- Sainte-Carmen of the Main by Michel Tremblay
- Sainte-Marie Among the Hurons by James W. Nichol
- The Saints and the Apostles by Raymond Storey
- Salaam-Shalom by Stephen Orlov
- Salesman in China by Jovanni Sy and Leanna Brodie
- Salesmen Don't Ride Bicycles by Leo Orenstein
- Salt-Water Moon by David French
- Salt Water Soakin' My Sox by Paul Ledoux
- Same Time, Next Year by Bernard Slade
- Sam's Last Dance by Sean Dixon
- Sam Slick: the Clockmaker by Paul Ledoux
- Sanctuary by Emil Sher
- Sand by Colleen Wagner
- The Sand by Laurie Fyffe
- Sapphire Butterfly Blue by Melissa Major
- Sarah's Play by Rex Deverell
- Saskatoon Pie! by Geoffrey Ursell
- Saul by Charles Heavysege
- Saving Angel by Charlotte Fielden
- Say Ginger Ale by Marcia Johnson
- Scary Stories by Gordon Armstrong
- Scenes from My Dock! by Vince Grittani
- Scenes From the 19th Hole by Vince Grittani
- Scenes From The Subjective Reality by David L. Young
- Schedules by Bruce McManus
- The Science of Disconnection by David Belke
- The School Show: The Great Huron County Teachers Strike of 1978 by Ted Johns
- Schoolhouse by Leanna Brodie
- Schoolyard Games by John Lazarus
- Scarpone by Vittorio Rossi
- Screwed, Blued and Tattooed by Simon Bradbury
- The Seagull by David French
- Seance by Tom Hendry
- Season of the Witch by Irene N. Watts
- Sea Turtle by Bo Anderson
- Second Chance by Mark Melymick
- Second Chance by Aviva Ravel
- The Second Shepherds' Play by Betty Jane Wylie
- The Secret Life of Haddon Mackenzie by Sky Gilbert
- The Secret Garden by Paul Ledoux
- The Secret Mask by Rick Chafe
- The Secret of the Spyglass by Robert William Pendergrast
- The Secret Story of Santa Claus by Tina Silver
- Secrets by John Lazarus
- Secrets of an Usherette by Gordon Armstrong
- Security by Neil Fleming
- Seeds by Annabel Soutar
- See Bob Run by Daniel MacIvor
- Self-Help by Norm Foster
- Selfie by Christine Quintana
- Selkirk Avenue by Bruce McManus
- Separate Beds by MJ Cruise.
- Separate Pieces: A Comedy Cabaret by Aviva Ravel
- Seven Days in the Life of Simon Labrosse by Carole Fréchette
- 7-10 Split by Michael G Wilmot
- 7 Stories by Morris Panych
- Severe Blow to the Head by Gil Garratt
- Sex in Heaven by Gordon Armstrong
- Sex Maniac by Kico Gonzalez-Risso
- Sexy Laundry by Michele Riml
- Shakedown Shakespeare by Philip Adams and Yvette Nolan
- The Shakespeare Show: Or, How an Illiterate Son of a Glover Became the Greatest Playwright in the World by Ryan Gladstone
- Shakespeare's Nigga by Joseph Jomo Pierre
- Shakespeare's Dog by Rick Chafe
- Shakespeare's Will by Vern Thiessen
- The Shape of a Girl by Joan MacLeod
- Sharnoozle by Robert Tsonos
- Shatter by Trina Davies
- Shea of the White Hands by Rose Scollard
- Sheep by Daniel R. Lillford
- Shelter by Carol Bolt
- Sheherazade and the 1001 Nights by Christine Foster
- She Has a Name by Andrew Kooman
- She Shoots, She Scores by Alan R. Davis
- The Shinbone General Store Caper by Rex Deverell
- Shoebox by Margaret Matulic
- Shoe Fly Blues by Rick McNair
- The Sholom Aleichem Show by Aviva Ravel
- The Shooting Stage by Michael MacLennan
- The Short Circuit by Rex Deverell
- Shortshrift by Rex Deverell
- The Short Tree and the Bird that Could Not Sing by Dennis Foon
- Shoulder Pads by Aviva Ravel
- Shusha and the Story Snatcher by Shirley Barrie
- Shylock by Mark Leiren-Young
- Shylock's Treasure by Munroe Scott
- Interface by Greg Nelson
- Signe's Lost Colours by Eleanor Albanese
- Silver Dagger by David French
- A Similar Difference by Paul Ledoux
- Sinners by Norm Foster
- Sinners Three & The Bad and the Sick by Stewart Lemoine
- Silver Bird and Scarlet Feather by Maurice Breslow
- Sir Gawain the Yellow Knight by James G. Patterson
- Sister Ella by Lucia Frangione
- Sister Jude by Dave Carley
- Sisters by Wendy Lill
- Sisters by Simon Johnston
- Sit Calm! by Rick McNair
- The Sitter by Norm Foster
- Sitting in Paradise by Eugene Stickland
- Six Dry Cakes for the Hunted by George Woodcock
- Six Puppet Plays by Beth McMaster
- Sixty Below by Patti Flather
- Sixty Below by Leonard Linklater
- '67 by Robert Wallace
- Skin by Dennis Foon
- Skydive by Kevin Kerr
- Sled by Judith Thompson
- A Sleigh-Ride Christmas Carol by Peter Anderson
- Sleigh Without Bells: a ghost story about the Donnellys by James Reaney
- The Sleeping Beauty by Gwen Pharis Ringwood
- Sleeproom by Robin Fulford
- Sleep, Speak, Turn Toward... by Valerie Senyk
- Sleepwalker by Kico Gonzalez-Risso
- Slow Trains an' Dirty Towns by Daniel R. Lillford
- Interface by Greg Nelson
- Slowly, an exchange is taking place by José Teodoro
- Small Time by Norm Foster
- Smoked Glass Ceiling by Rita Deverell
- Snake in Fridge by Brad Fraser
- Snow Dance by Daniel R. Lillford
- Socrates on Trial by Andrew David Irvine
- Soldier's Heart by David French
- So Many Doors by Celia McBride.
- Some Assembly Required by Eugene Stickland
- Someday by Drew Hayden Taylor
- Someone Sleeps Somewhere by Don Druick
- Something Dead and Evil Lurks in the Cemetery, and It's My Dad by Marty Chan
- Something New by Bo Anderson
- Something Wicked This Way Comes by Gyllian Raby
- Sometime, Never by Norah Harding
- Song of the Serpent by Betty Lambert
- Sonjo & the Thundergod by Shirley Barrie
- Sonny by James W. Nichol
- Sonya by Norma Harrs
- Soul Mate by David Belke
- The Soul Menders by Patti Flather
- Interfaceby Greg Nelson
- Speculum by Betty Jane Wylie
- Sperm Count by Stephen Orlov
- Spiral Woman and the Dirty Theatre by Linda Griffiths
- Interface by Greg Nelson
- Split by Kico Gonzalez-Risso
- Spirits of Gold by Kico Gonzalez-Risso
- Sports Legend by James G. Patterson
- Spot by Gordon Armstrong
- Spreading It Around by Londos D'Arrigo
- Squawk by Megan Gail Coles.
- Sqrieux-de-Dieu by Betty Lambert
- Stag and Doe by Mark Crawford
- Star by C. E. Gatchalian
- Star Gates by Paddy Campbell
- Star Struck by Viviene Laxdal
- Stargazing by Tom Cone
- Starter Home by Katherine Koller
- Stay by David Demchuk
- Steel Kiss by Robin Fulford
- Steps by Betty Jane Wylie
- Step Sister, Blood Brother by Viviene Laxdal
- Stick With Molasses by Beth McMaster
- St. George by Ian Weir
- Still the Night by Theresa Tova
- The Stillborn Lover by Timothy Findley
- Stitch by Cliff Cardinal
- A Stitch in Time by Dorothy Lees-Blakey and Brian Blakey
- Stolen Lives by Peter Colley
- The Stone Face by Sherry MacDonald
- Storm und Tango by Don Druick
- Storm Warning by Norm Foster
- The Story of a Sinking Man by Morris Panych
- Straight Stitching by Shirley Barrie
- The Strange Wet Saga of the Disappearing Ballerina by Gil Garratt
- Street Safe by Anna Fuerstenberg
- Stripes For Christmas by Beth McMaster
- St. Sam and the Nukes: Co-generation at the Bruce by Ted Johns
- Studies in Motion by Kevin Kerr
- Suburban Motel by George F. Walker
- Sucker Falls by Drew Hayden Taylor
- Suddenly Shakespeare by Kim Selody
- The Summer of the Piping Plover by Catherine Banks
- Summit Conference by John Gounod Campbell
- Sunday Dinner by Diane Grant
- Sungold by Irene N. Watts
- The Sun Runner by Kenneth Dyba
- Sunspots by Dennis Foon
- Surface Tension by Elyne Quan
- Surprise, Surprise by Michel Tremblay
- Sushi by Don Druick
- Suzie Goo: Private Secretary by Sky Gilbert
- Sveva by Janet Munsil
- The Swapper by Rose Scollard
- Sweet & Sour Pickles by Ted Galay
- Sweet Land of Liberty by Sharon Pollock.
- Sweet Marie by James Howard
- Swahili Godot by Robin Fulford
- Swimmers by Clem Martini
- Swipe by Gordon Pengilly
- Switching Places by Rex Deverell
- Swollen Tongues by Kathleen Oliver
- Sybil in the Middle by Barbara Novak

== T ==
- Tagged by Chantal Bilodeau
- Belle by Florence Gibson MacDonald
- Take d Milk, Nah? by Jivesh Parasram
- Take Me Where the Water's Warm by James DeFelice
- Taking Liberties by Dave Carley
- Taking Steam by Kenneth Klonsky and Brian Shein
- Tales From the Arabian Nights by Simon Johnston
- Tales From Tolstoy by Irene N. Watts
- Talk by Michael Nathanson
- Talking Bodies by Larry Tremblay
- The Talking Fish by Irene N. Watts
- Tamara by John Krizanc
- The Taming of the Tamer by Patrick Young
- The Taming of the Wild Things by Irene N. Watts
- Tango Noir by Rose Scollard
- Tangleflags by Carol Bolt
- Tantrums by Hrant Alianak
- The Tao of the World by Jovanni Sy
- A Taste of Empire by Jovanni Sy
- Tecumseh by Charles Mair
- Tempting Providence-scene by Robert Chafe
- Ten Ruminations on an Elegy Attributed to William Shakespeare by Sky Gilbert
- $38,000 for a Friendly Face by Kristin Shepherd
- Ten Times Two by David Belke
- Ten Ways to Abuse an Old Woman by Sally Clark
- Terror and Erebus by Gwendolyn MacEwen
- Test Drive by Dave Carley
- Texas Boy by George Rideout
- Thanks for giving by Kevin Loring
- That Darn Plot by David Belke
- That Elusive Spark by Janet Munsil
- That Summer by David French
- Theatre of the Film Noir by George F. Walker
- Theatrelife by Sky Gilbert
- Then and Now by Anne Chislett
- There's a Ghost in my Opera House by Jack Sheriff
- There Is Violence and There Is Righteous Violence and There Is Death, or the Born-Again Crow by Caleigh Crow
- Therese’s Creed by Michael Cook
- These Girls by Viviene Laxdal
- They Don't Call Them Farmers Anymore by Gordon Pengilly
- Thieves in the Night by David Demchuk
- Thin Ice by Beverley Cooper
- The Third Life of Eddie Mann by John Spurway
- 13th God by Rose Scollard
- Thirteen Hands by Carol Shields
- The Thirteenth One by Denyse Gervais Regan
- This Great City by Paul Dunn
- This Is How We Got Here by Keith Barker
- This is a Play by Daniel MacIvor
- This Pet's Allowed by Irene N. Watts
- This Year, Next Year by Norah Harding
- Three Questions by Gordon Armstrong
- Three Scenes in a Gazebo by Tom MacGregor
- Three Storey, Ocean View by Catherine Banks
- Three Strikes, You're Dead by George Rideout
- Through the Eyes by Don Druick
- Thumbelina by Julie Salverson
- Thy Kingdom Come by Daniel R. Lillford
- Ticks by C. E. Gatchalian
- Tiger of Malaya by Hiro Kanagawa
- Tiln by Michael Cook
- Time Bomb by Betty Jane Wylie
- TITANIC: The Untold Story by Anthony Sherwood
- 2 B WUT U R by Morris Panych
- Today I'll Be Fine by Carol Libman
- To Far Away Places by Rick McNair
- Together Forever by Harry Rintoul
- To Grandmother's House We Go by Joanna McClelland Glass
- Tom Form and the Speed of Love by Gordon Pengilly
- Too Many Cooks by Douglas E. Hughes and Marcia Kash
- Too Many Kings by Paddy Campbell
- Tornado by Judith Thompson
- Toronto at Dreamer's Rock by Drew Hayden Taylor
- Toronto, Mississippi by Joan MacLeod
- Toronto the Good by Andrew Moodie
- Tough! by George F. Walker
- Tideline by Wadji Mouawad
- To be Frank by Brian Drader
- Tokyoland by Don Druick
- The Tomorrow Box by Anne Chislett
- Tomorrow Will be Better by Irene N. Watts
- To Ride in Triumph by Douglas Abel
- Too Good to Be True by Cliff Cardinal
- Touch by David Demchuk
- The Tourist by José Teodoro
- Trading Injuries by Rahul Varma
- Trauma by Hope McIntyre
- Treasure Island by Ernest J. Schwarz
- Treasure Island by Michael Shepherd
- The Trial of Judith K. by Sally Clark
- Trial of a Ladies Man by Sally Clark
- The Trials of Eddy Haymour by John Lazarus
- The Trials of Ezra Pound by Timothy Findley
- The Trigger by Carmen Aguirre
- The Trouble with Richard by L. E. Hines
- Tripping Through Time by Shirley Barrie
- True Love Lies by Brad Fraser
- True North by Keith Dorland
- Trummi Kaput by Dennis Foon
- Trying by Joanna McClelland Glass
- Tsymbaly by Ted Galay
- Tuna Fish Eulogy by Lindsay Price
- Turnaround by Clem Martini
- Turns by Kevin Arthur Land
- TV Lounge by Carol Bolt
- Twenty-One Days by Rachel Wyatt
- Twice Six Plus One by Beth McMaster
- Twisted by Charlotte Corbeil-Coleman and Joseph Jomo Pierre
- The Twisted Loaf by Aviva Ravel
- Two Beers for Three People by David L. Young
- Two Brothers: A Parable of Free Trade by Ted Johns
- Two for the Pot by Ed Schroeter
- 2000 by Joan MacLeod
- The Two Rooms of Grace by Eleanor Albanese
- Two Words For Snow by Richard Sanger
- Two Ships Passing by Dave Carley
- 2-2 Tango by Daniel MacIvor

== U ==
- UBU The Barbarian by Paul Ledoux
- The Ugly Duchess by Janet Munsil
- The Ugly Man by Brad Fraser
- Ultravista by Gordon Armstrong
- Under the Graywacke: Voices of Northern Ontario by Ted Johns
- Under the Skin by Betty Lambert
- The Underground Lake by Rex Deverell
- Under Coyote's Eye by Henry Beissel
- The Understudy by Daniel R. Lillford
- Under the Big Top by Jan Derbyshire
- Under the Moon with Aunt Birdie by Eleanor Albanese
- Underwater, Overseas by Emil Sher
- Undressing The Nation by Kico Gonzalez-Risso
- Unholy Trinity by Maxim Mazumdar
- Unicorn Horns by Melissa Major
- Unidentified Human Remains and the True Nature of Love by Brad Fraser
- Union Maid by Aviva Ravel
- Unity, 1918 by Kevin Kerr
- The Unnatural and Accidental Women by Marie Clements
- The Unspecific Scandal by William Henry Fuller
- The Up-hill Revival by Rex Deverell
- Up Island by David King
- Up on the Roof by Clem Martini
- Up the Garden Path by Lisa Codrington
- Urban Nun by Dave Carley

== V ==
- Vengeance by Aviva Ravel
- The Ventriloquist by Leanna Brodie
- Venus Sucked In: A Post-Feminist Comedy
- Veranda by Betty Jane Wylie
- Veronia by Daniel Libman
- Vesalius and Servetus by Robert Lalonde
- The Vic by Leanna Brodie
- Vicious Little Boyz in the Rain by Gil Garratt
- Video by Yvette Nolan
- A View From The Roof by Dave Carley
- Vigil by Morris Panych
- The Vile Governess by Stewart Lemoine
- Village of Idiots by John Lazarus
- Vinci by Maureen Hunter
- The Violinist and the Flower Girl by Hrant Alianak
- Viridias by Muriel Hogue
- A Visit to Cal's Mother by Edwin Procunier
- Visions of Prostitutes by David L. Young
- The Voice of the People by Robertson Davies
- Voodoo by Kico Gonzalez-Risso

== W ==
- Waiting for Gaudreault by André Simard translated by Henry Beissel
- Waiting for the Parade by John Murrell
- Wake Me When It's Over by Vince Grittani
- Walk Right Up by Celia McBride
- Walking on the Moon by George Rideout
- Walking on Water by Dave Carley
- Wallflower by Aviva Ravel
- The Walls of Africa by Hrant Alianak
- Walsh by Sharon Pollock
- Wanda T. Grimsby: Detective Extraordinaire by Melissa Major
- Wanted by Sally Clark
- War by Dennis Foon
- War Babies by Margaret Hollingsworth
- Warm Wind in China by Kent Stetson
- Warriors by Michel Garneau
- The Washing Machine by Radha S. Menon
- Wasps by Sally Clark
- Was She Sown or Was She Reaped by John Gounod Campbell
- Watchin' by Mark Leiren-Young
- Waxworks by Trina Davies
- We Are So Different Now by Shauna Singh Baldwin
- Wedding Whine by Vince Grittani
- We Happy Few by Mark Blagrave
- Weird Kid by Rex Deverell
- Welfarewell by Cat Delaney
- West Edmonton Mall by Patti Flather
- The West Show by Paul Thompson
- Western by Hrant Alianak
- West of the 3rd Meridian by Trina Davies
- Westray by Chris O'Neill and Ken Schwatrz
- Whale Riding Weather by Bryden MacDonald
- What A Cad! by Celia McBride
- What a Young Wife Ought to Know by Hannah Moscovitch
- What if...? by Shirley Barrie
- What Lies Before Us by Morris Panych
- What the Ear Hears Last by Penn Kemp
- Whatever Makes You Happy by Aviva Ravel
- When George the Third Was King by Catharine Nina Merritt
- When Everybody Cares by Beth McMaster
- When Girls Collide by Stewart Lemoine
- When the Reaper Calls by Peter Colley
- When the World Was Young by Maurice Breslow
- When We Were Singing by Dorothy Dittrich
- Where is Kabuki? by Don Druick
- Where the Blood Mixes by Kevin Loring
- Where the River Meets the Sea by Patti Flather
- Whereverville by Josh Macdonald
- Whereville by Josh MacDonald
- While We're Young by Don Hannah
- Whiskey Six Cadenza by Sharon Pollock
- White Biting Dog by Judith Thompson
- White Sand by Judith Thompson
- Who Cares? by Eleanor Albanese
- Who Has Seen the Wind by Lee MacDougall
- Who Killed Spalding Gray? by Daniel MacIvor
- Who's Looking After the Atlantic? by Warren Graves
- Who's Pauline by Cherie Thiessen
- Who's Under Where? by Douglas E. Hughes and Marcia Kash
- Whole Lotto Love by Kevin Arthur Land
- The Whore's Revenge by Sky Gilbert
- Why We Tortured Him by Sky Gilbert
- Wide Awake Hearts by Brendan Gall
- Wilbur County Blues by Andrew Moodie
- Widger's Way by Gwen Pharis Ringwood
- Wild Abandon by Daniel MacIvor
- Wild Grapes by Richard Sanger
- Wild Mouth by Maureen Hunter
- Will the Real J.T. LeRoy Please Stand Up? by Sky Gilbert
- Willful Acts by Margaret Hollingsworth
- Wildcat by Simon Johnston
- William & James by Robert Tsonos
- William the Bard by David Belke
- Willie and the Watchers by Cherie Thiessen
- The Wind in the Willows by Michael Shamata
- The Windigo by Dennis Foon
- The Windigo by Tom MacGregor
- Windfall by Norm Foster
- Wings of Resistance by Eleanor Albanese
- Winners and Losers by Marcus Youssef and James Long
- Winnie by Patrick Young
- Wintersong by Carol Libman
- Wireless by Gil Garratt
- The Witch of Endor by Robert Norwood
- Witchcraft by Kico Gonzalez-Risso
- Witches & Bitches by Patrick Young
- With Bated Breath by Bryden MacDonald
- With Love and a Major Organ by Julia Lederer
- Wobbling Madonna by Lucia Frangione
- Wolfboy by Brad Fraser
- The Woman Who Touted Her Prize by Hilary R. Burke
- Women in the Attic by Len Peterson
- Wonderville by Kico Gonzalez-Risso
- The Work of Art by Victoria Dawe
- World of Wonders by Elliott Hayes
- The World We Live On Turns So That the Sun Appears to Rise by David Demchuk
- Would You Like a Cup of Tea? by Warren Graves
- Wreck of the National Line by Sharon Pollock.
- Wreckage by Sally Stubbs
- Wring the Roses by Amanda Cordner and David Di Giovanni
- Written on Water by Michel Marc Bouchard
- Writing With Our Feet by Dave Carley
- Wrong For Each Other by Norm Foster
- Wu-Feng by Munroe Scott

== Y ==
- Yankee Notions by Anne Chislett
- A Yard of Pucks by James DeFelice
- Yellow on Thursdays by Sara Graefe
- Yesterday the Children were Dancing by Gratien Gélinas
- Yesteryear by Joanna McClelland Glass
- Yodellers by Michael Healey and Kate Lynch
- You Are Here by Daniel MacIvor
- You Can't See Africa From Sicily by Heldor Schäfer
- You Fancy Yourself by Maja Ardal
- Young King Arthur by Clive Endersby
- You'll Get Used To It! - The War Show by Peter Colley
- You're a What?! by Margaret Matulic
- You're Him by John Lazarus
- Your Late Mama by Dorothy Lees-Blakey and Brian Blakey
- Yours 'Til The Moon Falls Down by Gordon Pengilly
- You Smell Good To Me by Tom Hendry
- You Want Me to be Grown-up, Don't I? by Rex Deverell
- Yuppie Ciao by Yuppie Ciao
- Yuppies! The Musical by Vince Grittani

== Z ==
- Zac and Speth by Rick Chafe
- Zaydok by Dennis Foon
- Zak and the Magic Blue Stone by Eleanor Albanese
- Zone by Aviva Ravel

== See also ==
- List of Canadian playwrights
- Theatre of Canada
- Canadian Stage production history
