= Floyd S. Chalmers Canadian Play Award =

Canadian literary award

- Awarded for: Literary award for Toronto theatre
- Country: Canada
- Presented by: Ontario Arts Council
- First award: 1979
- Final award: 2001
- Website: The Chalmers Awards for Creativity and Excellence in the Arts (discontinued)

The Floyd S. Chalmers Canadian Play Award was a Canadian literary award given to Canadian plays produced by any professional Canadian theatre company, and having performances in the Toronto area.

The prize had a monetary value of $25,000, and was named for benefactor Floyd Chalmers, an editor and publisher.

From the award's inception until 1980, one play was named the winner of the award, except for a tie in 1977. In 1980, the award began honouring multiple plays. That year, five winners were named. Since then, four plays normally won the award each year. In 1983, a youth theatre prize was added alongside the general theatre category.

The award was one of several arts awards created by the Chalmers family of Toronto. In 2001 the award was presented for the final time, and in 2002 the Chalmers family endowed an Ontario Arts Council fund for two arts grant programs.

== Winners ==
Year	General theatre	Youth theatre
1973	David Freeman, Creeps	No award presented
1974	David French, Of the Fields, Lately	No award presented
1975	James Reaney, Saint Nicholas Hotel	No award presented
1976	John Herbert, Fortune and Men's Eyes	No award presented
1977	W.O. Mitchell, Back to Beulah; Larry Fineberg, Eve	No award presented
1978	Rick Salutin, Les Canadiens	No award presented
1979	Roland Lepage, Le temps d'une vie	No award presented
1980	David Fennario, Balconville; David French, Jitters; John Gray, Billy Bishop Goes to War; Antonine Maillet, La Sagouine; John Murrell, Waiting for the Parade	No award presented
1981	Erika Ritter, Automatic Pilot; Neil Munro, F C U; George Luscombe, Mac Reynolds and Larry Cox, Mac Paps; John Craig and George Luscombe, Ain't Lookin'	No award presented
1982	Allan Stratton, Rexy!; Charles Tidler, Straight Ahead/Blind Dancers; George F. Walker, Theatre of the Film Noir	No award presented
1983	Anne Chislett, Quiet in the Land; John Lazarus and Joa Lazarus, Dreaming and Dueling; Tom Walmsley, White Boys	Marcel Sabourin, Pleurer pour rire
1984	Sherman Snukal, Talking Dirty; Jean-Pierre Plante, Francine Ruel, Louis Saia, Michel Côté, Marcel Gauthier, Marc Messier and Claude Meunier, Brew; Betty Lambert, Jennie's Story; Margaret Hollingsworth, Ever Loving	Jim Betts, Mystery of the Oak Island Treasure; Anne Dansereau, Une histoire à dormer debout; Joel Greenberg, The Nuclear Power Show
1985	George F. Walker, Criminals in Love; David French, Salt-Water Moon; John Krizanc, Prague; Sharon Pollock, Doc	Colin Thomas, One Thousand Cranes; Robert Bellefeuille and Isabelle Cauchy, Les nez
1986	Michel Tremblay, Albertine in Five Times; Michael Hollingsworth, The History of the Village of the Small Huts: Part 1, New France; Michael Mercer, Goodnight Disgrace; Allan Stratton, Papers	Suzanne Lebeau, Little Victories/Les petits pouvoirs; Duncan McGregor, Running the Gauntlet; John Lazarus, Not So Dumb; Paul Shilton and Jim Biros, The Fabulous Farming Show
1987	John Murrell, Farther West; Linda Griffiths, Jessica; Don Hannah, The Wedding Script; Tomson Highway, The Rez Sisters	Dennis Foon, Skin; Robert Morgan and David S. Craig, Morgan's Journey
1988	Tom Wood, B Movie: The Play; Robert Fothergill, Detaining Mr. Trotsky; Judith Thompson, I Am Yours; Ralph Burdman, Tête-à-Tête	Beverley Cooper and Baņuta Rubess, Thin Ice; Frank Etherington, The Snake Lady; Robert Morgan, Not As Hard As It Seems
1989	Paul Ledoux and David Young, Fire; Ann-Marie MacDonald, Goodnight Desdemona (Good Morning Juliet); Michel Tremblay, Le vrai monde?; George F. Walker, Nothing Sacred	Carol Bolt, Ice Time; Marvin Ishmael, Forever Free
1990	Sally Clark, Moo; Tomson Highway, Dry Lips Oughta Move to Kapuskasing; John Krizanc, The Half of It; George F. Walker, Love and Anger	The Great Unwashed Fish Collective, i.d.; Jim Betts, The Groundworld Adventure; Shirley Barrie, Straight Stitching
1991	Marie Brassard and Robert Lepage, Le Polygraphe; Brad Fraser, Unidentified Human Remains and the True Nature of Love; Judith Thompson, Lion in the Streets; Michel Tremblay, La maison suspendue	Martha Brooks, Andrew's Tree; Colin Thomas, Two Weeks Twice a Year
1992	Michel Marc Bouchard, Lilies, Daniel Brooks and Guillermo Verdecchia, The Noam Chomsky Lectures; Daniel MacIvor, House; John Mighton, A Short History of Night	Drew Hayden Taylor, Toronto at Dreamer's Rock; Maristella Roca, The Servant of Two Masters; Colin Thomas, Flesh and Blood
1993	Normand Chaurette, The Queens; Joan MacLeod, The Hope Slide; Jason Sherman, The League of Nathans; George F. Walker, Escape from Happiness	Michael Miller, Birds of a Feather; Shirley Barrie, Carrying the Calf; Paula Wing, Naomi's Road
1994	Michael Hollingsworth, The Life and Times of Mackenzie King; Hillar Liitoja, The Last Supper; Alisa Palmer, A Play About the Mothers de Mayo; Guillermo Verdecchia, Fronteras Americanas	Maristella Roca, Pinocchio; Kathleen McDonnell, Loon Boy; Edward Roy, A Secret Life
1995	Robert Lepage, Needles and Opium; Geoff Kavanagh, Ditch; Ken Garnhum, Pants on Fire; Diane Cave and Nadia Ross, The Alistair Trilogy	Joan MacLeod, Little Sister; Dennis Foon, The Short Tree and the Bird That Could Not Sing
1996	Timothy Findley, The Stillborn Lover; Brad Fraser, Poor Super Man; Andrew Moodie, Riot; John Murrell, The Faraway Nearby	Anne Chislett, Flippin' In; Rex Deverell, Belonging
1997	Don Druick, Where Is Kabuki?; Ted Dykstra and Richard Greenblatt, 2 Pianos, 4 Hands; Daniel MacIvor and Daniel Brooks, Here Lies Henry; Guillermo Verdecchia and Marcus Youssef, A Line in the Sand	David S. Craig, Napalm the Magnificent: Dancing with the Dark; Ron Reed, Book of the Dragon
1998	George F. Walker, Problem Child; Djanet Sears, Harlem Duet; Carole Fréchette, The Four Lives of Marie; David Rubinoff, Stuck	Ronnie Burkett, Old Friends; Robert Priest, Minibugs & Microchips
1999	George F. Walker, The End of Civilization; Leah Cherniak, Oliver Dennis, Maggie Huculak, Robert Morgan, Martha Ross and Michael Simpson, The Betrayal; Michel Marc Bouchard, The Orphan Muses; Jason Sherman, Patience	David S. Craig and Robert Morgan, Dib and Dub and the Journey Home; Robert Morgan, The General
2000	Linda Griffiths, Alien Creatures: A Visitation from Gwendolyn MacEwan; Michel Tremblay, For the Pleasure of Seeing Her Again; Ronnie Burkett, Street of Blood; Michael Healey, The Drawer Boy	Gail Nyoka, Mella Mella; Leslie Arden, The Happy Prince
2001	Florence Gibson, Belle; Chris Earle, Radio:30; Michael Redhill and Ross Manson, Building Jerusalem; George F. Walker, Heaven	Sean Reycraft, Pop Song; Richard Lacroix, André Laliberté and Richard Morin, The Starkeeper/Le porteur
