= Governor General's Award for English-language drama =

Canadian literary award

The Governor General's Award for English-language drama honours excellence in Canadian English-language playwriting. The award was created in 1981 when the Governor General's Award for English-language poetry or drama was divided.

Because the award is presented for plays published in print, a play's eligibility for the award can sometimes be several years later than its eligibility for awards, such as the Dora Mavor Moore Award for Outstanding New Play or the Floyd S. Chalmers Canadian Play Award, which are based on the theatrical staging. Titles which compile several works by the playwright into a single volume may also be nominated for or win the award.

== Winners and nominees ==
=== 1980s ===
Governor General's Award for English-language drama honorees, 1980-1989
Year	Author	Title	Ref.
1981	Sharon Pollock	Blood Relations	
1981	Charles Tidler	Straight Ahead and Blind Dancers	
1981	George F. Walker	Theatre of the Film Noir	
1982	John Gray	Billy Bishop Goes to War	
1982	Lawrence Jeffery	Clay	
1982	Betty Lambert	Jennie's Story	
1983	Anne Chislett	Quiet in the Land	
1983	No advance shortlist was released this year.		
1984	Judith Thompson	White Biting Dog	
1984	James Reaney	The Canadian Brothers or The Prophecy Fulfilled	
1984	George Ryga	A Letter to My Son	
1985	George F. Walker	Criminals in Love	
1985	David French	Salt-Water Moon	
1985	Margaret Hollingsworth	War Babies	
1985	Ken Mitchell	Gone the Burning Sun	
1986	Sharon Pollock	Doc	
1986	Frank Moher	Odd Jobs	
1986	Allan Stratton	Papers	
1987	John Krizanc	Prague	
1987	Wendy Lill	The Occupation of Heather Rose	
1987	Michael D.C. McKinlay	Walt and Roy	
1987	Sharon Pollock	Whiskey Six Cadenza	
1988	George F. Walker	Nothing Sacred	
1988	Dennis Foon	Skin	
1988	Tomson Highway	The Rez Sisters	
1988	Maureen Hunter	Footprints on the Moon	
1989	Judith Thompson	The Other Side of the Dark	
1989	Tomson Highway	Dry Lips Oughta Move to Kapuskasing	
1989	John Krizanc	Tamara	

=== 1990s ===
Governor General's Award for English-language drama honorees, 1990-1999
Year	Author	Title	Ref.
1990	Ann-Marie MacDonald	Goodnight Desdemona (Good Morning Juliet)	
1990	Audrey Butler	Black Friday?	
1990	John Mighton	Scientific Americans	
1990	George F. Walker	Love and Anger	
1991	Joan MacLeod	Amigo's Blue Guitar	
1991	Sally Clark	The Trial of Judith K.	
1991	Don Druick	Where Is Kabuki?	
1991	Linda Griffiths	The Darling Family	
1991	Daniel David Moses	Coyote City	
1992	John Mighton	Possible Worlds and A Short History of Night	
1992	Daniel Brooks, Guillermo Verdecchia	The Noam Chomsky Lectures	
1992	Dave Carley	Writing With Our Feet	
1992	Judith Thompson	Lion in the Streets	
1992	Dianne Warren	Serpent in the Night Sky	
1993	Guillermo Verdecchia	Fronteras Americanas	
1993	Daniel MacIvor	House Humans	
1993	Raymond Storey	The Saints and Apostles	
1993	David Young	Glenn	
1994	Morris Panych	The Ends of the Earth	
1994	Joanna McClelland Glass	If We Are Women	
1994	Wendy Lill	All Fall Down	
1994	Bryden MacDonald	Whale Riding Weather	
1995	Jason Sherman	Three in the Back, Two in the Head	
1995	Brad Fraser	Poor Super Man	
1995	Deborah Kimmett	Miracle Mother	
1995	Joan MacLeod	The Hope Slide/Little Sister	
1995	Eugene Stickland	Some Assembly Required	
1996	Colleen Wagner	The Monument	
1996	Wendy Lill	The Glace Bay Miners' Museum	
1996	John Mighton	The Little Years	
1996	Michael O'Brien	Mad Boy Chronicle	
1996	Betty Quan	Mother Tongue	
1997	Ian Ross	fareWel	
1997	Maureen Hunter	Atlantis	
1997	Lee MacDougall	High Life	
1997	Jason Sherman	Reading Hebron	
1997	Judith Thompson	Sled	
1998	Djanet Sears	Harlem Duet	
1998	Bruce McManus	Selkirk Avenue	
1998	Richard Sanger	Not Spain	
1998	Sandra Shamas	Sandra Shamas: A Trilogy of Performances	
1998	David Young	Inexpressible Island	
1999	Michael Healey	The Drawer Boy	
1999	Wendy Lill	Corker	
1999	Daniel MacIvor	Marion Bridge	
1999	Colleen Murphy	Beating Heart Cadaver	
1999	Theresa Tova	Still the Night	

=== 2000s ===
Governor General's Award for English-language drama honorees, 2000-2009
Year	Author	Title	Ref.
2000	Timothy Findley	Elizabeth Rex	
2000	George Boyd	Consecrated Ground	
2000	Linda Griffiths	Alien Creature	
2000	Daniel MacIvor, Daniel Brooks	Monster	
2000	Jason Sherman	It's All True	
2001	Kent Stetson	The Harps of God	
2001	Mark Brownell	Monsieur d'Eon	
2001	Clem Martini	A Three Martini Lunch	
2001	Michael Redhill	Building Jerusalem	
2001	Jason Sherman	An Acre of Time	
2002	Kevin Kerr	Unity (1918)	
2002	Claudia Dey	The Gwendolyn Poems	
2002	Lorena Gale	Je me souviens	
2002	Michael MacLennan	The Shooting Stage	
2003	Vern Thiessen	Einstein's Gift	
2003	Marie Clements	Burning Vision	
2003	Brian Drader	Prok	
2003	Sunil Kuruvilla	Rice Boy	
2003	Michael MacLennan	Last Romantics	
2004	Morris Panych	Girl in the Goldfish Bowl	
2004	Robert Chafe	Butler's Marsh and Tempting Providence	
2004	Michael Healey	Rune Arlidge	
2004	Karen Hines	The Pochsy Plays	
2004	Mieko Ouchi	The Red Priest (Eight Ways to Say Goodbye)	
2005	John Mighton	Half Life	
2005	Marjorie Chan	China Doll	
2005	Don Druick	Through the Eyes	
2005	Daniel MacIvor	Cul-de-sac	
2005	Richard Sanger	Two Words for Snow	
2006	Daniel MacIvor	I Still Love You	
2006	Morwyn Brebner	The Optimists	
2006	Lisa Codrington	Cast Iron	
2006	Jason Sherman	Adapt or Die: Plays New and Used	
2006	Drew Hayden Taylor	In a World Created by a Drunken God	
2007	Colleen Murphy	The December Man	
2007	Salvatore Antonio	In Gabriel's Kitchen	
2007	Anosh Irani	The Bombay Plays: The Matka King and Bombay Black	
2007	Rosa Labordé	Léo	
2007	Morris Panych	What Lies Before Us	
2008	Catherine Banks	Bone Cage	
2008	Ronnie Burkett	10 Days on Earth	
2008	Paul Ciufo	Reverend Jonah	
2008	Marie Clements	Copper Thunderbird	
2008	Judith Thompson	Palace of the End	
2009	Kevin Loring	Where the Blood Mixes	
2009	Beverley Cooper	Innocence Lost: A Play about Steven Truscott	
2009	Joan MacLeod	Another Home Invasion	
2009	Hannah Moscovitch	East of Berlin	
2009	Michael Nathanson	Talk	

=== 2010s ===
Governor General's Award for English-language drama honorees, 2010-2019
Year	Author	Title	Ref.
2010	Robert Chafe	Afterimage	
2010	Charlotte Corbeil-Coleman	Scratch	
2010	Michael Healey	Courageous	
2010	Judith Thompson	Such Creatures	
2010	David Yee	lady in the red dress	
2011	Erin Shields	If We Were Birds	
2011	Brendan Gall	Minor Complications: Two Plays	
2011	Jonathan Garfinkel	House of Many Tongues	
2011	Donna-Michelle St. Bernard	Gas Girls	
2011	Vern Thiessen	Lenin’s Embalmers	
2012	Catherine Banks	It Is Solved by Walking	
2012	Trina Davies	The Romeo Initiative	
2012	Karen Hines	Drama: Pilot Episode	
2012	Cathy Ostlere, Dennis Garnhum	Lost: A Memoir	
2012	Anusree Roy	Brothel #9	
2013	Nicolas Billon	Fault Lines: Three Plays	
2013	Meg Braem	Blood: A Scientific Romance	
2013	Kate Hewlett	The Swearing Jar	
2013	Lawrence Jeffery	Frenchtown	
2013	Joseph Jomo Pierre	Shakespeare's Nigga	
2014	Jordan Tannahill	Age of Minority: Three Solo Plays	
2014	Rick Chafe	The Secret Mask	
2014	Sean Dixon	A God in Need of Help	
2014	Janet Munsil	That Elusive Spark	
2015	David Yee	carried away on the crest of a wave	
2015	Beth Graham	The Gravitational Pull of Bernice Trimble	
2015	Tara Grammy, Tom Arthur Davis	Mahmoud	
2015	Bryden MacDonald	Odd Ducks	
2015	Marcus Youssef, James Long	Winners and Losers	
2016	Colleen Murphy	Pig Girl	
2016	Brad Fraser	Kill Me Now	
2016	Donna-Michelle St. Bernard	A Man A Fish	
2016	Jordan Tannahill	Concord Floral	
2016	Mary Vingoe	Refuge	
2017	Hiro Kanagawa	Indian Arm	
2017	Robert Chafe	The Colony of Unrequited Dreams	
2017	Anna Chatterton	Within the Glass	
2017	Michael Healey	1979	
2017	Kate Hennig	The Virgin Trial	
2018	Jordan Tannahill	Botticelli in the Fire and Sunday in Sodom	
2018	Keith Barker	This Is How We Got Here	
2018	Anna Chatterton, Evalyn Parry, Karin Randoja	Gertrude and Alice	
2018	Anosh Irani	The Men in White	
2018	Erin Shields	Paradise Lost	
2019	Amanda Parris	Other Side of the Game	
2019	Kevin Loring	Thanks for Giving	
2019	Hannah Moscovitch	What a Young Wife Ought to Know	
2019	Sean Harris Oliver	The Fighting Season	
2019	Tetsuro Shigematsu	1 Hour Photo	

=== 2020s ===
Year	Author	Title	Ref.
2020	Kim Senklip Harvey	Kamloopa: An Indigenous Matriarch Story	
2020	Yolanda Bonnell	bug	
2020	Christopher Cook	Quick Bright Things	
2020	Charlotte Corbeil-Coleman	Guarded Girls	
2020	Donna-Michelle St. Bernard	Sound of the Beast	
2021	Hannah Moscovitch	Sexual Misconduct of the Middle Classes	
2021	Falen Johnson	Two Indians	
2021	Jivesh Parasram	Take d Milk, Nah?	
2021	Paul David Power	Crippled	
2021	Christine Quintana	Selfie	
2022	Dorothy Dittrich	The Piano Teacher: A Healing Key	
2022	Daniel Arnold, Darrell Dennis, Medina Hahn	Inheritance: a pick-the-path experience	
2022	Robert Chafe	Everybody Just C@lm the F#ck Down	
2022	Marjorie Chan	Lady Sunrise	
2022	Ho Ka Kei (Jeff Ho)	Iphigenia and the Furies (On Taurian Land) & Antigone: 方	
2023	Cliff Cardinal	As You Like It, A Radical Retelling	
2023	Darla Contois	The War Being Waged	
2023	Hiro Kanagawa	Forgiveness	
2023	Suvendrini Lena	The Enchanted Loom	
2023	Jordan Tannahill	Is My Microphone On?	
2024	Caleigh Crow	There Is Violence and There Is Righteous Violence and There Is Death, or the Born-Again Crow	
2024	Makram Ayache	The Green Line	
2024	Scott Jones, Robert Chafe	I Forgive You	
2024	Mishka Lavigne	Shorelines	
2024	Pamela Mala Sinha	New	
2025	Tara Beagan	Rise, Red River	
2025	Catherine Banks	Downed Hearts	
2025	Tara Beagan	The Ministry of Grace	
2025	Alisa Palmer, Hannah Moscovitch	Fall on Your Knees	
2025	Anusree Roy	Little Pretty and the Exceptional	
2026	Jordan Tannahill	Prince Faggot	
2026	Leanna Brodie, Jovanni Sy	Salesman in China	
2026	Susanna Fournier	Pyper	
2026	Hannah Moscovitch	Red Like Fruit	

== Multiple winners and nominees ==
=== 3 Wins ===
- Jordan Tannahill

=== 2 Wins ===
- Catherine Banks
- John Mighton
- Colleen Murphy
- Morris Panych
- Sharon Pollock
- Judith Thompson
- George F. Walker

=== 6 Nominations ===
- Judith Thompson (2 wins)

=== 5 Nominations ===
- Robert Chafe (1 win, 1 with cowriter)
- Daniel MacIvor (1 win, 1 with cowriter)
- Hannah Moscovitch (1 win, 1 with cowriter)
- Jason Sherman (1 win)
- Jordan Tannahill (3 wins)

=== 4 Nominations ===
- Wendy Lill
- Michael Healey (1 win)
- John Mighton (2 wins)
- George F. Walker (2 wins)

=== 3 Nominations ===
- Catherine Banks (2 wins)
- Joan MacLeod (1 win)
- Colleen Murphy (2 wins)
- Morris Panych (2 wins)
- Sharon Pollock (2 wins)
- Donna-Michelle St. Bernard

=== 2 Nominations ===
- Tara Beagan (both in the same year, 1 win)
- Daniel Brooks (both with cowriters)
- Marjorie Chan
- Anna Chatterton (consecutive, 1 with cowriters)
- Marie Clements
- Charlotte Corbeil-Coleman
- Don Druick
- Brad Fraser
- Linda Griffiths
- Tomson Highway (consecutive)
- Karen Hines
- Maureen Hunter
- Anosh Irani
- Lawrence Jeffrey
- Hiro Kanagawa (1 win)
- John Krizanc (1 win)
- Kevin Loring (1 win)
- Bryden MacDonald
- Michael MacLennon (consecutive)
- Anusree Roy
- Richard Sanger
- Erin Shields (1 win)
- Vern Thiessen (1 win)
- Guillermo Verdecchia (consecutive, 1 with cowriter, 1 win)
- David Yee (1 win)
- David Young

Drew Hayden Taylor and Anosh Irani have also both been nominated for the Governor General's Award for English-language fiction.

James Reaney won the equivalent award three times for both his poetry and plays prior to the 1981 split of Poetry and Drama into separate categories.

Mishka Lavigne is the first person to be nominated for both the English and French language awards for Drama.

2025 was the first time that the nominees were all women - and the first time that a nominee was up for two works in the same year: Tara Beagan.
