= Catanzariti =

Catanzariti is an Italian surname. Notable people with the surname include:

- Danielle Catanzariti (born 1992), Australian actress
- Franco Catanzariti, Canadian playwright
- Tony Catanzariti (born 1949), Australian politician and citrus farmer
