= Charles Tidler =

American-Canadian writer (born 1946)

Charles Tidler (born 1946) is an American–Canadian writer. He is a poet, small press publisher, playwright, novelist and spoken jazz artist. He is most noted for his early theatrical plays Straight Ahead and Blind Dancers and his later novels Going to New Orleans and Hard Hed: The Hoosier Chapman Papers.

== Early life and education ==
Born Charles Lewis Amstutz in Bluffton, Ohio on April 23, 1946, his surname was changed to Tidler on April 19, 1950. Raised in Tipton, Indiana, he studied literature and philosophy at Purdue University, where his mentors included Barriss Mills, William H. Gass and May Swenson. Tidler founded the poetry magazine Wordjock while at Purdue.

== Career ==
=== Early works ===
Moving to British Columbia in 1969, Tidler settled on Salt Spring Island. He pursued an apprenticeship in poetry and published small mimeo magazines under the imprint Orphan Presz. With his new wife and son, Tidler moved to Vancouver in 1975. He became a typesetter, working at Arsenal Pulp Press and also for George Payerle. Pulp published his book-length poem FLIGHT: The Last American Poem in 1976. Tidler has said, "The poetry, despite being unheralded, was and is my life and the reason I persisted as a writer. And the little mag scene is crucial to understanding my madness." In July 1977, Tidler moved to Comox, B.C., and in 1980 to a homesite near Merville, B.C.

Encouraged by playwrights Tom Walmsley and Erika Ritter, and a workshop with Urjo Kareda, he wrote his first jazz play, Blind Dancers, a two-hander premiered by The New Play Centre at City Stage, Vancouver, in February 1979. Companion one-act play Straight Ahead, a jazz monologue by Ohio farm girl Louisa Potter at the edge of a threshing field on the day the atom bomb was dropped on Nagasaki, was produced by New Play Centre in April 1981. Both plays, starring Rosemary Dunsmore and featuring Michael Hogan as her lover Dell, directed by Henry Tarvainen, were staged as an evening production by Toronto Free Theatre in May 1981, at the Toronto Theatre Festival. They were a success at the Edinburgh Fringe before returning to Toronto's Berkeley Street Theatre in October. Straight Ahead and Blind Dancers continued to receive stagings in various theatre markets. The plays had 36 productions in all, including a three-week run at Tricycle Theatre in London's West End and a tour in southern England.

Tidler also wrote teleplays and screenplays, and had 45 scripts produced by CBC Radio, including an adaptation of Antigone, dramatic portraits of Andy Warhol and August Strindberg, six tales from Nathaniel Hawthorne, four episodes of The Mystery Project, and Singers of the Floating Highway, an anthology of six poets on the road produced by Bill Lane. Tidler summarized, "I learned a lot writing radio plays, because of the range I was allowed by producers and the calibre of actors and musicians involved."

=== Later works ===
Tidler began a teaching career in 1986, and for six years was the visiting lecturer in playwriting at the University of Victoria. In 1992 he was passed over for a permanent position in favour of Margaret Hollingsworth. His 1996 satire The Sex Change Artist, a critique of academic patriarchy and its control of affirmative action at the time, was controversial. It was produced by CBC Radio and for the stage by Victoria's Intrepid Theatre. In spring 2001, Tidler returned to teaching playwriting at the University of Victoria, until his retirement there in fall 2015.

He continued to write stage plays, including The Farewell Heart, The Butcher's Apron, Fabulous Yellow Roman Candle, Red Mango: a blues, Tortoise Boy, and 7eventy 7even. His 2000 play Red Mango was staged as a double bill with a 20th-anniversary revival of Blind Dancers. Tidler stated, "Red Mango was a breakthrough, where I decided to hell with writing what people expected of me."

His debut novel Going to New Orleans was published by Anvil Press in 2004 to good reviews. Hard Hed: The Hoosier Chapman Papers, a retelling of the Johnny Appleseed story, appeared in 2011, followed by Useless Things [Redacted] in 2017.

== Bibliography ==
=== Poems ===
- North of Indianapolis – 1969
- Straw Things – 1972
- Whetstone Almanac – 1975
- Flight: The Last American Poem – 1976
- Anonymous Stone – 1977
- Broken Branches – 1977
- Dinosaurs (with story by Laura Lippert) — 1982
- Coffee Cops — 2006
- Straw Things: Selected Poetry & Song — 2008

=== Stage plays ===
- Straight Ahead – 1981
- Blind Dancers – 1981
- The Farewell Heart – 1983
- Fabulous Yellow Roman Candle – 1993
- The Sex Change Artist – 1996
- Jazz Play Trio: Fabulous Yellow Roman Candle, Straight Ahead, Blind Dancers — 1999
- Red Mango: a blues – 2001
- Rappaccini's Daughter – 2005
- The Butcher's Apron – 2006
- Tortoise Boy: A Chamber Play – 2008
- Spit Delaney's Island: The Play – 2015
- 7eventy 7even: 77 Found Micro Dramas – 2019

=== Novels ===
- Going to New Orleans – 2004
- Hard Hed: The Hoosier Chapman Papers – 2011
- Useless Things [Redacted] – 2016

== Awards and honors ==
Straight Ahead and Blind Dancers were jointly shortlisted for the Governor General's Award for English-language drama at the 1981 Governor General's Awards and won a Floyd S. Chalmers Canadian Play Award in 1982.
