= Verdecchia =

Verdecchia is a surname. Notable people with the surname include:

- Guillermo Verdecchia (born 1962), Canadian playwright
- Luca Verdecchia (born 1978), Italian sprinter
