= Unity (1918) =

Play written by Kevin Kerr

- Original language: English
- Written by: Kevin Kerr
- Characters: Beatrice, Sissy, Sunna, Hart, Michael, Glen, Mary, Rose, Doris, Stan
- Subject: Spanish flu pandemic
- Genre: Drama
- Setting: Unity, Saskatchewan, during the Spanish flu pandemic

Premiere
- Date: 2001
- Place: Vancouver East Cultural Centre, Vancouver, British Columbia

Unity (1918) is a play by Canadian playwright Kevin Kerr. The play won the 2002 Governor General's Award for English-language drama. The play was published by Talonbooks.

== Synopsis ==
Set in Unity, Saskatchewan near the end of World War I, the Spanish flu pandemic brings the town to a paranoid halt. Caught up in the strife are sisters Beatrice and Sissy, as well as their friend Mary.

== Awards and nominations ==
Along with the Governor General's Award, the play also won two Jessie Richardson Theatre Awards, including the Sydney J. Risk Award for emerging playwright.
