= Kamloopa =

Play by Kim Senklip Harvey

- 2020 paperback edition
- Author: Kim Senklip Harvey
- Language: English
- Genre: Drama
- Published: April 7, 2020
- Publisher: Talonbooks
- Publication place: Canada
- Media type: Print (paperback)
- Pages: 112
- Awards: Governor General’s Literary Award; Jessie Richardson Award; Sydney J. Risk Prize
- ISBN: 9781772012422
- Website: talonbooks.com

Kamloopa: An Indigenous Matriarch Story is a play written by Canadian playwright Kim Senklip Harvey. It is the winner of the 2020 Governor General’s Literary Award for English-language drama. Published in Canada by Talonbooks in April 2020 and co-authored with members of the Fire Company, the book includes a foreword by Lindsay Lachance and a zine by Kimi Clark.

== Backstory ==
Harvey won the Governor General's Award for English-language drama less than a week after receiving her MFA in writing from the University of Victoria. She wrote the play "to ignite the power that was within Indigenous people." While developing the print version, Harvey worked with Indigenous matriarch Nancy Saddleman to translate the "n̓səl̓xcin̓" parts of the play. She deliberately wrote, "moments where you have to switch your paradigm into a Syilx one.”

== Synopsis ==
Two urban Indigenous sisters, Mikaya and Kilawna, and their new friend Edith, a lawless trickster, reconnect with their ancestors, their culture, and each other on their way to Kamloopa, the largest pow wow on the West Coast, in Kamloops, British Columbia.

== Awards ==
Kamloopa: An Indigenous Matriarch Story won the 2020 Governor General’s Literary Award for English-language drama, the 2019 Jessie Richardson Award for significant artistic achievement, and the 2019 Sydney J. Risk Prize for outstanding original play by an emerging playwright.
