= Kim Senklip Harvey =

Canadian actress and playwright

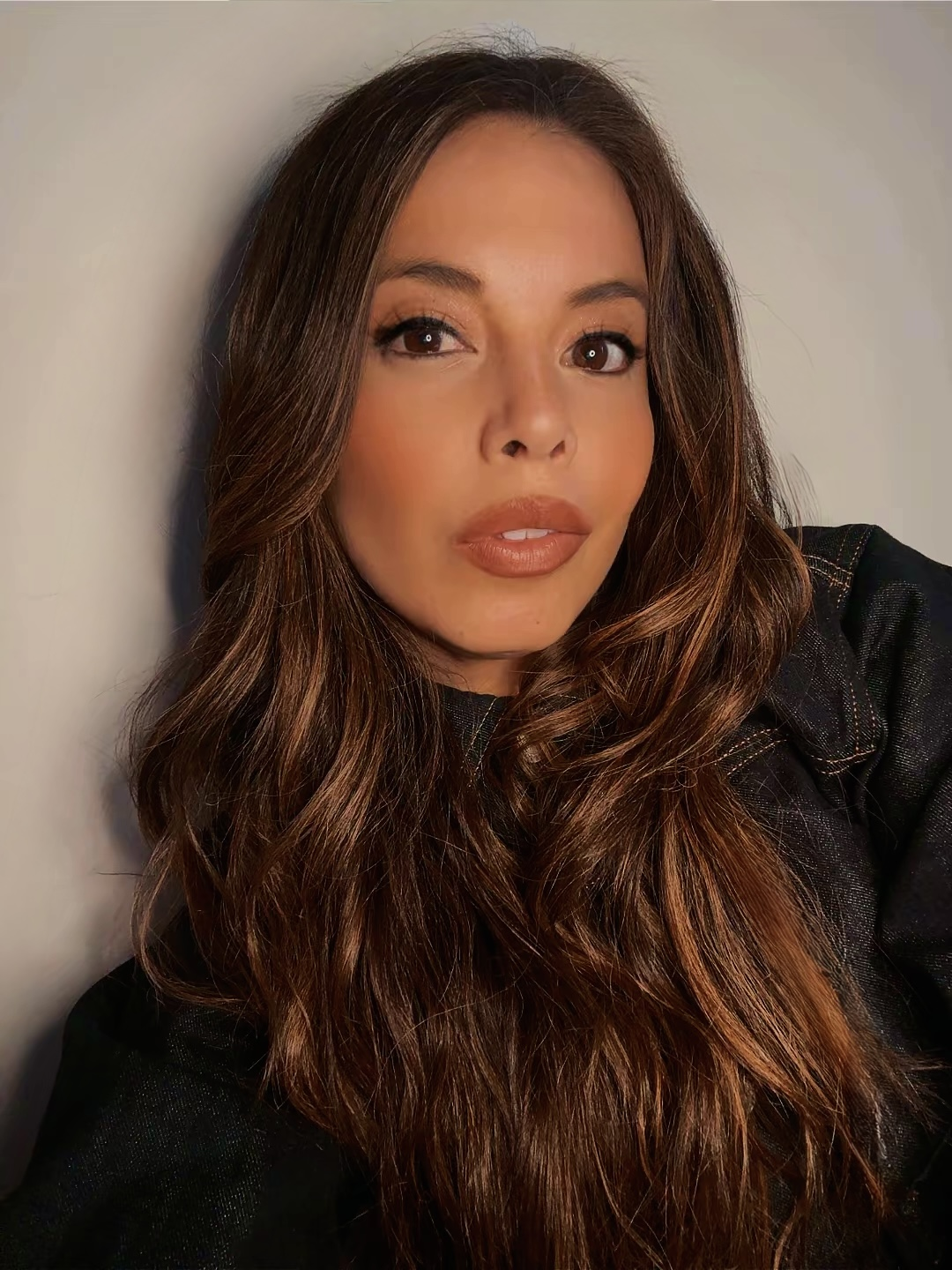
Kim Senklip Harvey

Kim Senklip Harvey is a Canadian actress, playwright and director. She is most noted for her play Kamloopa: An Indigenous Matriarch Story, which won the Governor General's Award for English-language drama at the 2020 Governor General's Awards.

Harvey is Syilx and Tsilhqot’in with ancestral ties to the Dakelh, Secwepemc and Ktunaxa communities, she is a graduate of the theatre program at the University of British Columbia. She had stage roles for a while after graduating, but found herself burning out due to always having to play negative portrayals of indigenous women as victims, and left the theatre for some time to work as an advocate for indigenous children in foster care. She returned to theatre in 2017, writing Kamloopa with the goal of presenting a more balanced view of the strength of indigenous women.

Harvey holds a Master of Fine Arts in Creative Writing from the University of Victoria, completed in 2021. She is currently a Vanier Scholar and PhD candidate in Law at the University of Victoria, where her research advances Indigenous legal theory through creative practice and cultural guardianship. The Vanier Canada Graduate Scholarship is among the most prestigious doctoral distinctions in Canada, awarded to world-class researchers demonstrating exceptional academic achievement and leadership.
