= Homechild =

Homechild is a play written by Canadian Governor General's Award-winning playwright Joan MacLeod.

The play's undertone is about the migration of the nearly 100,000 "home children," orphans and children placed for adoption who were transplanted from the United Kingdom to then-British colonies of Canada, Australia, and New Zealand between the 1860s and 1930s. It centres on the character of Alistair MacEachern, a crotchety, funny, and fearless farmer who, for 70 years, has silently longed for the sister he left behind in Scotland.

Homechild premiered at CanStage in Toronto in January 2006 to unenthusiastic reviews.
