= Wonderville =

Arcade bar and event space in Bedford-Stuyvesant, New York City, U.S.

- Address: 1186 Broadway, Brooklyn, New York
- Location: Bedford–Stuyvesant, Brooklyn
- Owner: Mark Kleback, Stephanie Gross
- Type: Arcade bar and event space
- Events: Video games, independent games, live performances

Construction
- Opened: June 2019

Website
- wonderville.nyc

Wonderville is an arcade bar and event space located in the Bedford-Stuyvesant neighborhood of Brooklyn, New York City. Established in 2019 by Mark Kleback and Stephanie Gross, the venue is dedicated to showcasing independently developed arcade games. Wonderville hosts a variety of events including tournaments, live performances, and community workshops. Since its opening, Wonderville has been recognized for its contribution to New York City's independent gaming scene.

== History ==
Wonderville was founded in 2019 by Mark Kleback and Stephanie Gross. Drawing from their experiences at the DIY venue Death By Audio, they envisioned a space to showcase independently developed arcade games alongside a bar and event space. Initial funding came through a successful Kickstarter campaign.

Wonderville opened on June 1, 2019, featuring a lineup of indie arcade games and quickly became a hub for local developers, musicians, and artists. Early programming included workshops, playtest nights, and performances, emphasizing in-person social interaction over traditional gaming experiences.

During the COVID-19 pandemic, Wonderville shifted operations online, launching "Wonderverse," a virtual venue hosted in Minecraft, and organizing a 12-hour Twitch telethon in December 2020 to support the business and its staff. The physical space also adapted with socially distanced outdoor setups.

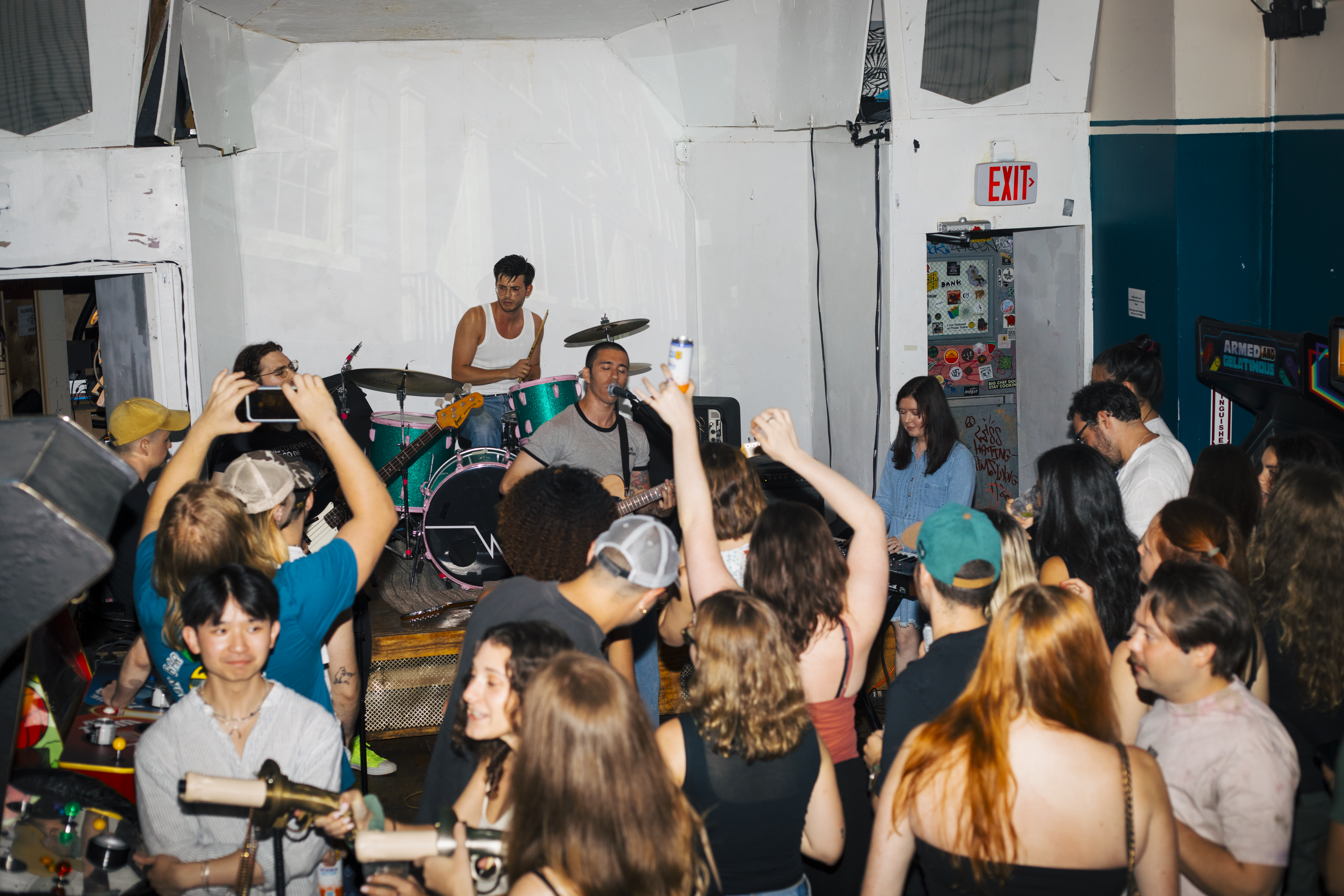
A live music performance in Wonderville’s event space

In the post-pandemic period, Wonderville expanded its event offerings. In 2025, it organized a memorial event for the demolished Kingda Ka roller coaster.

== Concept ==
=== Venue layout and design ===
The venue features a bar, arcade floor, and performance space. Its layout allows for both social gatherings and scheduled performances, with capacity for events such as concerts, tournaments, and workshops.

=== Games collection ===
Wonderville maintains a rotating collection of approximately thirty independently developed arcade games. Among the titles regularly featured are Killer Queen, a ten-player competitive strategy game; Nidhogg 2, a stylized dueling game; and Particle Mace, a physics-based multiplayer arcade game. The venue's games often use custom-built cabinets and alternative control schemes to further distinguish them from mainstream commercial arcades.

== See also ==
- Barcade
- Indie game
