= Realwheels Theatre =

Canadian theatre company

- Formation: 2003
- Type: Theatre group
- Purpose: Disability theatre
- Location: Vancouver, British Columbia
- Artistic director: Tomas Mureika
- Website: realwheels.ca

Glitch Theatre, formerly known as Realwheels Theatre, is a Canadian disability theatre company based in Vancouver, British Columbia. Realwheels was founded in 2003 by James Sanders and has since received multiple Jessie Richardson Theatre Awards and nominations.

== History ==
In 2000, James Sanders – an actor who became quadriplegic in 1990 – and Trevor Found created the Realwheels Ad Hoc Collective, which would eventually break out into Realwheels Theatre. They began by producing plays without a disability centred story.

After the success of these productions, Sanders, in 2003, founded and incorporated Realwheels Theatre as a registered non-profit. Sanders has described Realwheels' mandate as being to promote "a deeper understanding of the disability experience." James Sanders held the Artistic Director position until 2014 when Managing Director, Rena Cohen, assumed both roles. In 2021, Realwheels, welcomed Tomas Mureika into the Artistic Director role.

Realwheels' first major production since its founding was Skydive in 2007, which Sanders commissioned from playwright Kevin Kerr and starred in alongside actor Bob Frazer. It won the 2007 CITT/ICTS Award of Technical Merit. In 2010, Realwheels worked with Kerr again, co-producing Spine, a play commissioned by the Vancouver 2010 Cultural Olympiad.

In 2019, Realwheels announced that Kirsten Kirsch would be its inaugural playwright-in-residence, with her residency beginning in 2020. In 2020 and 2021, Realwheels adapted their in-person theatre approach to include virtual community performances. In May 2021 Wheel Voices: Tune In! premiered with a virtual cast.

The Realwheels Acting Academy was established in 2021, inviting its first cohort of students for September 2021. The program is designed for people with disabilities. Supported and created in part by disability community members, the Realwheels Acting Academy aims to increase the direct participation of people with disabilities in the cultural landscape and make systemic change.

In 2023, Realwheels celebrated their 20th anniversary. The 20th anniversary season included Saturday Night At Axles, a piece commissioned from the company's new artistic associate Adam Grant Warren, Vascular Necrosis by Jordyn Wood, and the radio play Disability Tour Bus.

To kick off the 2025-26 season, the company announced a re-branding and that the company would now be known as Glitch Theatre. The season kicked off with the world premiere of Faye's Room, written by Alex K. Masse, the company's first mainstage production since the COVID-19 pandemic. The play was written by an autistic playwright and featured a team of directors, designers, and cast the majority of whom were majority neurodiverse.

== Production history ==
=== Community productions ===
Realwheels community performances include any artist that self identifies as living with disability who wants to be involved.

- SuperVoices (2015)
- SexyVoices (2016)
- Comedy on Wheels (2017)
- Wheel Voices: Tune In! (2021)

=== Professional productions ===
- Skydive by Kevin Kerr (2007)
- Spine by Kevin Kerr (2011)
- Whose Life is it Anyway? by Brian Clark (2014)
- Re-Calculating by Lucas Foss and Liesl Lafferty (2015)
- Creeps by David E. Freeman (2016)
- Sequence by Arun Lakra (2018)
- Act of Faith by Janet Munsil (2019)
- Teenage Dick by Mike Lew, in collaboration with Bard on the Beach and Arts Club Theatre (2022)
- In Camera translated by Cory Haas from Jean-Paul Sartre's No Exit, live-streamed digital production (2022)
- Faye's Room by Alex K. Masse (2025)

== Awards and nominations ==
Year	Award	Category	Work	Results	Notes	Ref.
2007	Jessie Richardson Theatre Awards	Outstanding Direction – Large Theatre	Skydive	Won	for Roy Surette and Stephen Drover	
2007	Jessie Richardson Theatre Awards	Outstanding Choreography – Large Theatre	Skydive	Won	for Sven Johansson	
2007	Jessie Richardson Theatre Awards	Outstanding Sound Design – Large Theatre	Skydive	Won	for Alessandro Juliani and Meg Roe	
2014	Jessie Richardson Theatre Awards	Outstanding Performance by Actor in a Lead Role – Small Theatre	Whose Life is it Anyway?	Won	for Bob Frazer	
2014	Jessie Richardson Theatre Awards	Outstanding Production – Small Theatre	Whose Life is it Anyway?	Nominated		
2014	Jessie Richardson Theatre Awards	Outstanding Lighting Design – Small Theatre	Whose Life is it Anyway?	Won	for Adrian Muir	
2014	Jessie Richardson Theatre Awards	Outstanding Direction – Small Theatre	Whose Life is it Anyway?	Nominated	for John Cooper	
2017	Jessie Richardson Theatre Awards	Outstanding Costume Design – Small Theatre	Creeps	Nominated	for Christopher David Gauthier	
2017	Jessie Richardson Theatre Awards	Outstanding Set Design – Small Theatre	Creeps	Won	for Lauchlin Johnston	
2017	Jessie Richardson Theatre Awards	Outstanding Direction – Small Theatre	Creeps	Nominated	for Brian Cochrane	
2017	Jessie Richardson Theatre Awards	Outstanding Production of a Play – Small Theatre	Creeps	Won		
2017	Jessie Richardson Theatre Awards	Significant Artistic Achievement – Small Theatre	Creeps	Won	for Outstanding Ensemble Performance	
