= Creeps (play) =

- Written by: David E. Freeman
- Genre: Dark comedy
- Setting: 1970s Toronto

Creeps is a one-act play by David E. Freeman that premiered in 1971 at Factory Theatre Lab. The play is about four men with cerebral palsy working in a sheltered workshop in 1970s Toronto.

== Synopsis ==
Creeps follows four disabled men working in a sheltered workshop for men with cerebral palsy in 1970s Toronto. The men escape from their menial work to the workshop bathroom, where the play is set. The men barricade themselves in the bathroom in protest of their work and the way they are treated. A telethon and circus performance from the Shriners occasionally interrupts the men.

== Development ==
In 1964, Maclean’s published Freeman's article "The World Of Can’t." The article was about the difficulties of being taken seriously as responsible members of society while living with cerebral palsy. CBC commissioned Freeman to adapt "The World of Can't" for television; however, this adaptation was never completed. Theatre director Bill Glassco later suggested that Freeman turn the television script into a stage play. He wrote the script on a typewriter using a stick held between his teeth.

== Productions ==
Creeps premiered in February 1971 at Factory Theatre Lab in Toronto. Later that year, Creeps was part of Tarragon Theatre's first season, featuring John Candy. The play won the Floyd S. Chalmers Canadian Play Award in 1973.

The play had its US premiere in 1973 at Folger Theater in Washington before going to Playhouse 2 in New York City. The production was directed by Louis W. Scheeder. In 1979, the University of Saskatchewan Drama Department staged Creeps under the direction of Tom Kerr. The U of S production traveled to the Edinburgh Fringe Festival, the British premiere of the play, and won a Fringe First award.

In 2016, Realwheels Theatre in Vancouver staged the play under the direction of Brian Cochrane. This was the first production of the play to feature disabled actors playing disabled characters. The production won three Jessie Richardson Theatre Awards in 2017 in the small theatre category: Outstanding Direction, Significant Artistic Achievement for the ensemble cast, and Outstanding Set Design for Lauchlin Johnston. Additionally, Christopher David Gauthier was nominated for Outstanding Costume Design for his work on the production and Cochrane was nominated for Outstanding Direction.
