= Love and Anger (play) =

Play by George F. Walker

Love and Anger is a play by George F. Walker. It remains one of his most widely produced plays both in Canada and internationally.

It is the fourth installment of Walker's East End Plays, a series of plays that also includes Criminals in Love, Better Living, Beautiful City and Escape from Happiness. Walker wrote the play specifically as a starring vehicle for actor Peter Blais, who had performed in supporting roles in nearly all of Walker's plays over the previous decade, to the point that he had earned a reputation as the "quintessential" Walker actor.

The play was a shortlisted finalist for the Governor General's Award for English-language drama at the 1990 Governor General's Awards, and won the Floyd S. Chalmers Canadian Play Award and the Dora Mavor Moore Award for Outstanding New Play.

== Plot ==
The play centres on Petey Maxwell, a lawyer in Toronto who is recovering from a stroke. Formerly a greedy corporate lawyer, he has reinvented himself as a champion of the underdog who runs a one-man legal office with the help of his secretary Eleanor Downey. His first client is Gail, a woman whose husband has been framed for a crime by John "Babe" Connor, the wealthy and powerful publisher of an archly conservative tabloid newspaper; Connor's lawyer Sean, an aspiring politician, is a former law school classmate of Maxwell's who is now married to Maxwell's ex-wife. Maxwell's only other ally is Sarah, Eleanor's mentally ill sister.

At the play's climax, Maxwell stages a mock trial in his office to charge Connor with being "incurably evil", with the trial presided over by Sarah.

== Productions ==
The play premiered at the Factory Theatre in 1989. Its original cast comprised Blais as Petey Maxwell, Clare Coulter as Eleanor, Nancy Beatty as Sarah, Benedict Campbell as John Connor, Dawn Roach as Gail and Hardee T. Lineham as Sean Harris. In March 1990, Eric Peterson took over from Blais in the lead role for several weeks, although Blais returned to the role when the play moved to the Bluma Appel Theatre in May.

The play opened at the Perry Street Theatre in New York City in December 1990, with Saul Rubinek in the lead. A 1996 production at the West Coast Ensemble Theatre in Los Angeles starred Ian Buchanan as Petey Maxwell.
