= Factory Theatre =

Theatre in Toronto, Ontario, Canada

Coordinates: 43.645573°N 79.402721°W

The Factory Theatre
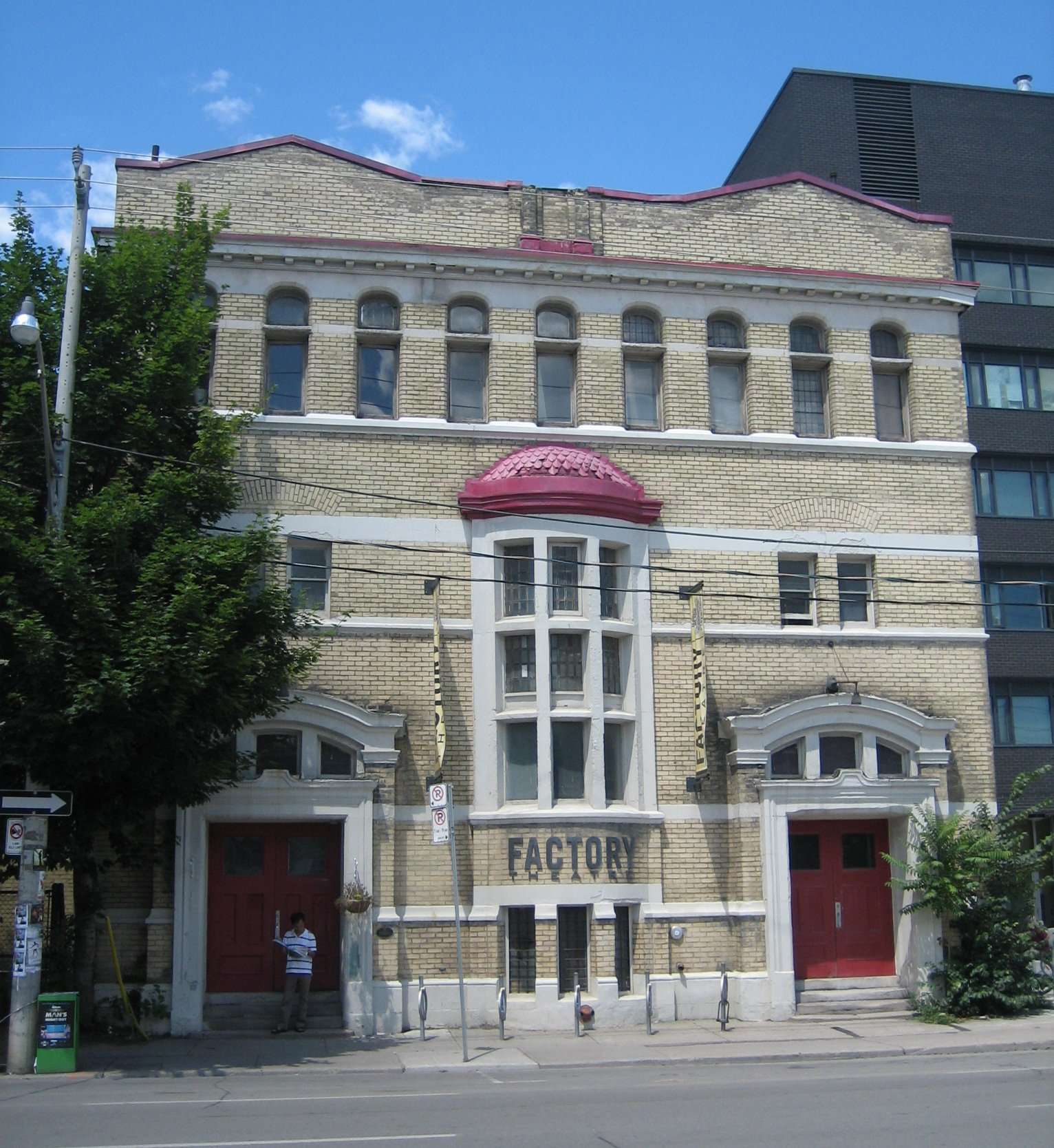
- The Factory Theatre
- Interactive map of The Factory Theatre
- Address: 125 Bathurst Street M5V 2R2; Toronto, Ontario; Canada

Construction
- Years active: 1970 - Present

Factory Theatre is a theatre in Toronto, Ontario, Canada. It was founded as Factory Theatre Lab in 1970 by Ken Gass and Frank Trotz, and it was run for almost 20 years by Dian English.

Factory Theatre was the first to announce that it would exclusively produce Canadian plays, but it soon became a widely emulated policy by other theatre companies. Factory became known as the home of the Canadian playwright and is often associated with George F. Walker, most of whose plays premiered there.

== Building history ==
Architects Gundry and Langley designed the building in 1869. J.M. Cowan is considered the subsequent architect/consultant.

Factory Theatre consists of two main buildings. The first is the original 1896 house and the second is the 1910 addition. The building is also known as the John Mulvey House. It was given heritage status by the Ontario Heritage Board in 1987.

The original house was constructed in a classic Queen Anne Gothic design for the prominent Toronto merchant John Mulvey in 1869.

It is attributed to architects Gundry & Langley. The house’s architectural features include:

- an asymmetrical façade
- an irregular gabled roof
- aine buff brickwork with stone sills and hood moldings
- a Gothic arch entry

In 1909, the property was sold to the Roman Catholic Church, Parish of St. Mary, and was used as their Arts and Literary Centre.

The larger addition to the complex was built in 1910 and designed by J.M. Cowan. It includes a church hall set up in theatre style with an overhanging balcony still in use today.

The addition’s main architectural features all face Adelaide Street. They are:

- a distinctive facade
- a central oriel window
- two flanking entrances with arched transoms

Before Factory Theatre occupied the building in 1983, it had been used as a residence, a manse, and a daycare.

== Leadership history ==
In 1977, Gass's play Winter Offensive aroused widespread criticism because of what was regarded as its gratuitous depiction of sex and violence amongst the upper echelons of the Nazi party. Frustrated by what he saw as the conservatism of the community, Gass resigned. Dian English took over the role of managing director of the Factory (1977–1995) and moved the theatre to its current location in the historic building at the corner of Bathurst and Adelaide (125 Bathurst Street, Toronto, On) and pulled the struggling theatre out of debt into fiscal solvency.

Gass was succeeded as artistic director of Factory by Bob White (1977–87), then Jackie Maxwell (1987–95). During much of this time, George F. Walker came on as the in-house writer with plays such as The Art of War, Criminals in Love, Love, and Anger, Escape from Happiness, Theatre of the Film Noir and Nothing Sacred. Other notable works included Crossing Over by Neil Munro, The Rez Sisters by Tomson Highway, Rick Mercer's one-man show, Robert Lepage's The Dragon's Trilogy, and The Kids in the Hall.

Michael Springate replaced English as creative director for the 1995–96 season after he left in 1995. The theatre had hit a rough patch financially at this point, and there was widespread concern that it might permanently close. But Gass came back in 1996 to take over as creative director once more with the goal of getting the theatre back on its feet. His decision to perform all six of the plays in George F. Walker's Suburban Motel as a full season brought the theatre a remarkably swift return to popularity, relevance, and financial prosperity.

Factory purchased its heritage facility in March 1999.

Gass was fired as artistic director in 2012 amid controversy. Several playwrights, including Walker and Judith Thompson, pulled their work from the theatre in protest, and figures including Atom Egoyan, Gordon Pinsent, Fiona Reid, and R. H. Thomson called for a boycott of the company. Since then, theatre professionals and community partners have publicly supported Factory Theatre and its existing pursuit of New Canadian voices. Nina Lee Aquino and Nigel Shawn Williams were named the new artistic directors in late 2012.

In December 2014, Factory Theatre was rebranded as "Factory. Theatre with Grit" and announced that Aquino was appointed sole artistic director. Factory's artistic team came to include Aquino as artistic director, Williams as associate artistic director, and Jonathan Heppner as artistic producer.

Aquino served as Artistic Director of Factory Theatre from 2014 up until 2022 (after which she was appointed Artistic Director of the National Arts Centre English Theatre). Mel Hague assumed the Artistic Directorship of Factory Theatre in May 2022.
