= There Is Violence and There Is Righteous Violence and There Is Death, or the Born-Again Crow =

2019 play by Caleigh Crow

- Written by: Caleigh Crow

Premiere
- Date: 2019
- Place: Calgary, Alberta, Canada

There Is Violence and There Is Righteous Violence and There Is Death, or the Born-Again Crow, sometimes shortened to The Born-Again Crow or There is Violence, is a 2019 play by Caleigh Crow. The play won the Governor General’s Award for English-language drama in 2024.

== Synopsis ==
The Born-Again Crow follows Beth, who has been fired from her minimum wage job and moves back in with her mother, Francine, who lives in the suburbs. Beth begins feeding the neighborhood crows and one of them begins talking to her.

== Productions ==
The Born-Again Crow premiered 2019 at the Motel Theatre in the Arts Commons in Calgary, starring playwright, Caleigh Crow, as Beth. Crow and her brother, Colin Wolf, produced, co-directed, and performed in the play with their company, Thumbs Up Good Work.

The play made its Toronto premiere in 2025 in a co-production between Buddies in Bad Times and Native Earth Performing Arts, directed by Jessica Carmichael and starring Tara Sky, Cheri Maracle, Dan Mousseau, and Madison Walsh. The set was designed by Shannon Lea-Doyle and the costumes were designed by Asa Benally.This production also featured fight choreography from Jenn Dzialoszynski, lighting design by Hailey Verbonac, and sound design by Chris Ross-Ewart.

== Awards and nominations ==
The Born-Again Crow was a finalist in the Prose in English category at the 2024 Indigenous Voices Awards and won the 2024 Governor General’s Award for English-language drama.

In addition to Dan Mousseau winning best supporting performance in a play (shared with Nancy Palk for Infinite Life) for his performance, Buddies in Bad Times and Native Earth Performing Arts received a special citation, awarded for work outside the scope of the traditional award categories, for the play at the 2025 Toronto Theatre Critics Awards. The play was also nominated for the Dora Mavor Moore Award for Outstanding New Play in 2025.
