= Sandra Dempsey =

Canadian playwright

Sandra Dempsey (born 1956) is a Canadian playwright. Her play D'Arcy was a semi-finalist for Theatre Ontario's Playwrights Showcase in 1980. Her produced and published plays include Armagideon, Flying To Glory, Enigma, Wings To Victory, Barbie & Ken, Casualties, Clap Trap, Legacy, Orders, Rosa's Lament, Pierre La, Air Apparent, Fat Cans, Our Bushmaster, ShocknAwe, Pee Pipe, Officer Drag, Inhumanitarianism, and Wings and a Prayer.
