= Particle Mace =

2015 video game

- Developer: Andy Wallace
- Publisher: EQG
- Platforms: Windows, Mac OS, iOS
- Release: January 22, 2015
- Genre: Action game
- Modes: Single-player, Multiplayer, Multiplayer co-op

Particle Mace is a 2D space combat game that was released on January 22, 2015, for Windows and Mac OS X, and January 28, 2015, for iOS.

The game received positive reviews from critics, who called the game fun, with a deep system of gameplay.

== Gameplay ==
Players control a spaceship which lacks weaponry, instead, having to fight by swinging around a mace made of trash particles that are tethered to their ship. The mace can be controlled using by using the ship's own momentum to drag it along behind, and rapidly changing direction to swing it at enemies and obstacles.

Different modes and ships can be unlocked by performing better in the game, including Light and Heavy versions.

== Development ==
Earlier in its development, the player's ship was capable of shooting, and had a shield that operated similarly to the mace in the current version of the game. Andy Wallace, the game's designer, decided that the shooting was not as fun as the more original physics-based shield mechanic, so he removed it, and changed the shield into a weapon.

== Reception ==
Particle Mace was well received by critics, with an aggregate score of 87/100 on Metacritic for the iOS version.

Tommy Daniels of DarkZero rated the game 10/10, saying that the game "lovingly embraces the influences of the 1980s" and "ends up being a pure delight."

Carter Dotson of TouchArcade rated the game 5/5 stars, calling the iOS version "well worth the wait" and the combat system "fun to play with", and said he could "see himself playing [it] for a long time to come".
