= The Emotionalists =

Emotionalists is a group of artists founded as an artistic movement in 1994 by sculptor, painter and designer of the Polish School of Industrial Design, and professor emeritus at University of Bridgeport, Lubomir Tomaszewski. The group has as its mission the return to the natural language of expression in art and seeks to awaken deep emotions in the viewer and communicate: “Less show, more content”. The philosophy of this movement is also a reaction to the "over-intellectualized" modern art and its loss of emotion and mood, which its considers one of the most important factors for the artist as well as the viewer. Because of this, the artist looks to tradition and "lasting values" in art, vehemently condemning experimentation and simplification or geometrization for the sole purpose of surprising or shocking the viewer. The spectrum of the works is broad, ranging from figurative to conceptual. It's a multi-disciplinary group, associating painters, sculptors, illustrators, photographers, graphic artists, textile designers, dancers, and musicians
