= Caleigh Crow =

Métis playwright and actress

Caleigh Crow is a Métis playwright and actress from Calgary, Alberta, Canada. She is most noted for her play There Is Violence and There Is Righteous Violence and There Is Death, or the Born-Again Crow, which won the Governor General's Award for English-language drama at the 2024 Governor General's Awards.

Cofounder of Thumbs Up Good Work Theatre with her brother Colin Wolf, she has had both acting and directing credits in the Calgary theatre scene. There Is Violence was first staged at Calgary's Arts Commons in 2019, and was staged in several other cities before being published by Playwrights Canada Press in fall 2023.

Her other plays have included Hexen and The Big McCoy.

In addition to her Governor General's Award win, There Is Violence was shortlisted for the Indigenous Voices Awards in the English prose category in 2024, and for the Dora Mavor Moore Award for Outstanding New Play, General Theatre in 2025.
