= Joan MacLeod =

Canadian playwright (born 1954)

- Born: 1954 (age 71–72); Vancouver, British Columbia
- Occupation: Playwright
- Writing career
- Period: 1980s–present
- Notable works: Amigo's Blue Guitar, The Hope Slide
- Website: www.joanmacleod.com

Joan MacLeod (born 1954) is a Canadian playwright. She is best known for her 1990s plays, particularly Amigo's Blue Guitar (1990) and The Hope Slide (1993).

Raised in North Vancouver, MacLeod studied creative writing at the University of Victoria and the University of British Columbia. She later joined the playwrights unit at the Tarragon Theatre in Toronto, Ontario. She remained with Tarragon for six years as a 'playwright in residence'.

She returned to British Columbia in 1992, where she has taught creative writing at the University of British Columbia, the University of Victoria and Kwantlen College. Since 2004, she has been a professor at the University of Victoria.

== Awards ==
She won the Governor General's Award for English-language drama at the 1991 Governor General's Awards for Amigo's Blue Guitar. She was shortlisted for the same award at the 1995 Governor General's Awards for The Hope Slide and Little Sister, and at the 2009 Governor General's Awards for Another Home Invasion.

She won the Floyd S. Chalmers Canadian Play Award in 1993 for The Hope Slide, was shortlisted for the Dora Mavor Moore Award for Outstanding New Play in 1990 for Amigo's Blue Guitar, and won the Jessie Richardson Award and the Betty Mitchell Award in 2001 for The Shape of a Girl.

MacLeod won the Siminovitch Prize in Theatre in 2011.

== Plays ==
- Jewel (1987)
- Toronto Mississippi (1987)
- Amigo's Blue Guitar (1990)
- The Hope Slide (1992)
- Little Sister (1994)
- 2000 (1996)
- The Shape of a Girl (2001)
- Homechild (2006)
- Another Home Invasion (2009)
- The Valley (2013)
- Gracie (2017)
