= Kevin Kerr (actor) =

Canadian actor and writer (born 1968)

Kevin Kerr (born 1968 in Vancouver, British Columbia) is a Canadian playwright, actor, director and founding member of Electric Company Theatre. From 2007 to 2010, he was Lee Playwright in Residence at University of Alberta.

He was born in Vancouver and grew up in Kamloops, British Columbia. He studied theatre at the University of British Columbia, and at Studio 58, Langara College.

He has co-authored several plays with Electric Company Theatre based in Vancouver, British Columbia including The Wake, The Score, Dora Flor and Her Two Husbands, Flop, The Fall, and Brilliant! The Blinding Enlightenment of Nikola Tesla. His 2001 play Unity (1918) explores the Influenza epidemic of 1918 and won the 2002 Governor General's Award for Drama.

== Published works ==
- Unity (1918). Vancouver, BC: Talonbooks, 2002. ISBN 978-0-88922-461-2.
- Brilliant!: The Blinding Enlightenment of Nikola Tesla. Victoria, BC: Brindle and Glass, 2004. ISBN 0-9732481-9-X
- Studies in Motion. Vancouver, BC: Talonbooks, 2008. ISBN 978-0-88922-592-3.
- Skydive. Vancouver, BC: Talonbooks, 2010. ISBN 978-0-88922-638-8.
