= Guillermo Verdecchia =

Canadian writer

Guillermo Verdecchia (born December 7, 1962) is a Canadian theatre artist.

Verdecchia was born in Buenos Aires, Argentina and came to Canada at the age of two. He was raised in Kitchener, Ontario. Verdecchia received an undergraduate degree in theatre at Ryerson Polytechnical Institute in Toronto, and a master's degree in English and Theatre Studies from the University of Guelph in Guelph, Ontario.

Verdecchia received the 1993 Governor-General's Award for Drama for his play Fronteras Americanas. He is a four-time winner of the Floyd S. Chalmers Canadian Play Award, and a recipient of various other awards for acting as well as sundry film festival awards for Crucero/Crossroads, the short film, made with Ramiro Puerta, based on Fronteras Americanas.

His work engages questions of representation, political power, and cultural theory. Verdecchia is a sessional instructor at Algoma University and has been writer-in-residence at Memorial University of Newfoundland, the University of Guelph, and at Ca' Foscari in Venice. In 2007 he was the 2007 Hayes-Jenkinson Memorial lecturer at Algoma University. He is also an instructor in the University of Toronto, and teaches various drama related courses.

He has also published a collection of short stories, Citizen Suarez in 1998.

== Plays ==
- Lions in Verona, 1980
- Not Another Banana Republic, 1987
- i.d., 1989 with The Hour Co.
- Final Decisions (WAR), 1990 (published as Another Country, 2007)
- The Noam Chomsky Lectures, 1990 with Daniel Brooks
- Fronteras Americanas, 1993 (Based on identity issues of Latin American immigrants.)
- A Line in the Sand, 1995 with Marcus Youssef
- The Terrible but Incomplete Journals of John D, 1996
- Insomnia, 1998 with Daniel Brooks
- Ali & Ali and the Axes of Evil, 2004 with Camyar Chai and Marcus Youssef
- bloom, 2006
