= Escape from Happiness =

Play written by George F. Walker

Escape From Happiness is a play by Canadian playwright George F. Walker. It was first produced in July 1991 in New York City, and was first produced in Canada at the Factory Theatre in February 1992. It is the final installment of Walker's East End Plays, a series of plays that also includes Criminals in Love, Better Living, Beautiful City and Love and Anger.
