= Shirley Barrie =

Canadian writer (1945–2018)

- Born: Shirley Grace Barrie; September 30, 1945; Tillsonburg, Ontario
- Died: April 15, 2018 (aged 72); Princess Margaret Hospital, Toronto
- Website: www.shirleybarrie.ca

Shirley Barrie (1945–2018) was a Canadian writer. She was the co-founder of the Wakefield Tricycle Company and Tricycle Theatre. Her plays include Straight Stitching, Carrying the Calf, and Tripping Through Time.

== Early life and education ==
Barrie was born on September 30, 1945, in Tillsonburg, Ontario. She was a member of the University Alumnae Dramatic Club at the University of Toronto. Barrie attended Western University in London, Ontario and Carleton University in Ottawa. While at Carleton, Barrie co-founded a college theatre group called Sock 'n' Buskin with Ken Chubb, who she would later marry.

== Career ==
In 1972, Barrie co-founded the Wakefield Tricycle Company in London, England with husband Ken Chubb. They named the company in reference to medieval mystery plays and a pub in King's Cross. In 1980, the two set up the Tricycle Theatre, dropping Wakefield from the name, at Kilburn High Road. Until 1984, Barrie was an associate director of Tricycle Theatre.

After returning to Toronto, Barrie and Lib Spry founded Straight Stitching Productions in 1989. Straight Stitching Productions produced Barrie's play Straight Stitching, about immigrant women working in the garment industry. The show featured songs by Arlene Mantle. Straight Stitching went on to become a runner-up for the Floyd S. Chalmers Canadian Play Award. Straight Stitching Productions later produced Carrying the Calf, a play for children addressing violence against women from the perspective of young women attending a self-defense class. Barrie was inspired to write the play after reading a Globe and Mail article that claimed that, "81% of Canadian female university students admit to having experienced psychological, sexual or physical abuse on a date". Carrying the Calf won a Dora Mavor Moore Award for outstanding play for young audiences in 1992.

Working with the Workman Theatre Project, a theatre company that integrates people with mental illness, Barrie created the play Tripping Through Time in 1993. In the show, audiences are immersed in a mental asylum and given diagnoses at random. The play dramatizes experiences at the Queen Street Mental Health Centre from 1850 to the present.

== Awards and nominations ==
Year	Award	Category	Work	Result	Ref.
1990	Floyd S. Chalmers Award	n/a	Straight Stitching	Nominated	
1992	Dora Mavor Moore Awards	Outstanding play for young audiences (small theatre)	Carrying the Calf	Won	
2015	NOW Magazine’s People's Choice Awards	Best Toronto Playwright	n/a	Nominated	
2015	Tom Hendry Awards	PGC Lifetime Award	n/a	Won	

== Works ==
Plays:

- The Adventures of Super Granny and the Kid
- Beautiful Lady, Tell Me...
- Brigid Bonfast: Space Scientist
- Choices
- The Girl in the Flower Basket
- In the Midst of Death
- Topsy Turvy
- Straight Stitching
- Shusha And The Story Snatcher
- Riders Of The Sea
- Jack Sheppard's Back
- Carrying the Calf
- What if...?
- Two Tonic
- The Pear is Ripe
- Revelation
- Reflections
- Riders of the Sea
- Sonjo & the Thundergod
- Hansel and Gretel
- Beautiful Lady, Tell Me...
- Tripping Through Time
- Measure Of The World
- Queen Marie
- I Am Marguerite
- Marguerite de Roberval

As editor:

- Prepare to Embark: Six Theatrical Voyages for Young Adults

== Personal life ==
Barrie was married to Ken Chubb. The two returned from London to live in Canada in 1985. They had two children. Barrie died at the Princess Margaret Hospital in Toronto on April 15, 2018.
