= Marcus Youssef =

Canadian playwright

- Occupation: Playwright
- Writing career
- Notable awards: Floyd S. Chalmers Canadian Play Award (1997); Siminovitch Prize in Theatre (2017)

Marcus Youssef is a Canadian playwright. He is most noted for the play Winners and Losers, a collaboration with James Long which was shortlisted for the Dora Mavor Moore Award for Best Original Play, General Theatre in 2014, and the Governor General's Award for English-language drama at the 2015 Governor General's Awards.

He previously won a Floyd S. Chalmers Canadian Play Award in 1997 for A Line in the Sand, a collaboration with Guillermo Verdecchia, and was the winner of the Siminovitch Prize in Theatre in 2017.

Born to Egyptian immigrant parents and raised in Montreal, Quebec, he is based in Vancouver, British Columbia, where he has been artistic director of Neworld Theatre, co-founded the PL 1422 artist-run centre, and has been an adjunct professor of creative writing at the University of British Columbia. His other plays have included The Adventures of Ali & Ali and the Axes of Evil (2004), Adrift on the Nile (2007), Ali & Ali: The Deportation Hearings (2010), Jabber (2014), King Arthur's Night (2018) and The In-Between (2022).
