= Franco Catanzariti =

Canadian playwright

Franco Catanzariti is a Canadian playwright, whose play Sahel was staged by the Théâtre du Nouvel-Ontario and published by Prise de parole in 2003. It was a shortlisted finalist for the Trillium Book Award and the Governor General's Award for French-language drama, and won the Prix Christine-Dumitriu-Van-Saanen from the Salon du livre de Toronto, in 2004.

The play was inspired by a trip to Ghana which Catanzariti undertook in the 1970s, during which he spent time among the nomadic Wodaabe people, and depicted a mother and daughter struggling to survive after being abandoned in the desert. The play's set design and construction was complex, consisting mainly of sand but requiring the ability to pull objects into "vortexes" of sand and out of view.

At the time of the play's production, Catanzariti was living in Ailsa Craig, Ontario. As of 2017, he was listed as a director of the Burundi Education Fund, a charitable organization based in London, Ontario.
