= Peter Anderson (playwright) =

Canadian-American playwright

Peter Carl Anderson
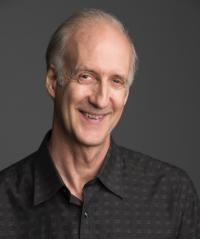
- Born: March 30, 1950 (age 76); Detroit, Michigan
- Occupations: Playwright, actor, clown
- Spouse: Melody Anderson

Peter Anderson (born 1950) is a Canadian-American playwright.

Anderson studied at the Dell'Arte International School of Physical Theatre before moving to Canada in 1977. He has a BA in Creative Writing and Literature from the University of Michigan Residential College (1972). He lives in Vancouver with his wife Melody Anderson.

Anderson is the recipient of six Jessie Richardson Awards, a Bay Area Critics’ Circle Award, Leo and Gemini nominations for best performance (The Overcoat), and a NY Drama Desk nomination.

== Plays ==
The Coyotes, 1978
Horseplay (with Phil Savath), 1981
Law of the Land, 1982
Animal Farm (with Nick Hutchinson), 1985
El Crocodor (with company),1986
Rattle in the Dash, 1987
Bull By the Horns, 1987
Bones, 1988
The Shepherds' Play, 1989
Creation, 1991
Nativity, 1991
The Number 14 (collective), 1992
Passion, 1993
Lysistrata, 1995
The Ballad of Weedy Peetstraw (with John Millard), 1999
A Sleigh-Ride Christmas Carol, 2000
The Coyotes' Christmas, 2001
The Blue Horse, 2007
The Emperor's New Threads (with Melody Anderson), 2007
Don Quixote (with Colin Heath), 2010
Head Over Heels, 2014
Flee (with David Hudgins & Jonathon Young), 2015
Still Life, 2016

== Monologues and Short Pieces ==
Air / Toast / Public Speaking / Who Do You Think You Are / Audition Piece, Brave New Works, Alberta Theatre Projects, Calgary, 1988-1995
Torment, The Kiss Commissions, Performance Works, Vancouver, 1995
Picture Window, Playwrights Theatre Centre, New Play Festival, Vancouver, 1996
Stupid, commissioned by Corrine Koslo for “The Joy of Six”, Women in View, 1998
After/Math, opera libretto with Jennifer Butler, composer, 2011
Background Noise, song (Peggy Lee, composer), 2014

== Other Published Work ==
Fiction & Poetry in Anon, Periodical Lunch, Cider Press Broadsides. 1972-77
Rattle in the Dash (Playwrights Canada Press: 1988)
Two monologues in The Perfect Piece (Playwrights Canada Press: 1990)
"Breaking All Four Walls" (Canadian Theatre Review #75, Fall 1993)
Monologue in Another Perfect Piece (Playwrights Canada Press: 1995)
“Play of the Land” article for the Vancouver Sun (August 28, 1999)
Horseplay in Playing the Pacific Province: An Anthology of British Columbia Plays 1967-2000 (Playwrights Canada Press: 2001)
Monologue in Refractions:Solo (Playwrights Canada Press: 2014)
