= Don Druick =

Don Druick (born July 23, 1945) is a Canadian writer and composer. He is most noted as a two-time nominee for the Governor General's Award for English-language drama, receiving nods at the 1991 Governor General's Awards for Where Is Kabuki? and at the 2005 Governor General's Awards for Through the Eyes.

A native of Montreal, Quebec, Druick studied mathematics at McGill University and studied flute under Hervé Baillargeon, Jean C. Morin, Harriet Crossland-Edwards and Gail Grimstead. He has been a composer for film and theatre.

Where Is Kabuki? was also a winner of the Floyd S. Chalmers Canadian Play Award in 1997.
