= Kathleen McDonnell =

Canadian author (born 1947)

Kathleen Elizabeth McDonnell (born 1947 Chicago) is a Canadian author. She has been writing plays, fiction and non-fiction for both adults and young audiences since the late 1970s, and has also been a freelance broadcaster for CBC Radio.

Born in Chicago, Illinois in 1947, she came to Canada in 1969. McDonnell has been Playwright-in-Residence at Youtheatre in Montreal and at the Lorraine Kimsa Theatre (formerly Young People's Theatre) in Toronto, Ontario. She is a member of the Playwrights Guild of Canada and Writers' Union of Canada.

== Works ==
=== Books ===
- Swim Home: Searching for the Wild Girl of Champagne, non-fiction. Friesen Press, Vancouver, 2020
- The Songweavers, Book III of The Notherland Journeys, young-adult novel series. Second Story Press, Toronto, 2008
- 1212: Year Of The Journey, a young-adult historical novel, Second Story Press, Toronto, 2006
- Honey, We Lost The Kids: Re-thinking Childhood in the Multimedia Age. Second Story Press, Toronto, 2001. Revised edition 2005
- Putting On A Show: Theater for Young People, a book about young-audience plays including the scripts of The Seven Ravens, Loon Boy, Ezzie's Emerald, and Foundlings. Second Story Press, Toronto, 2004
- The Shining World, Book II of The Notherland Journeys, young-adult novel series. Second Story Press, Toronto, 2003
- The Nordlings, Book I of The Notherland Journeys, young-adult novel series. Second Story Press, Toronto, 1999
- Kid Culture: Children & Adults & Popular Culture. Second Story Press, Toronto, 1994. Pluto Press, Australia, 2000
- Ezzie's Emerald, children's novel. Second Story Press, Toronto, 1990;
- Not An Easy Choice: Re-examining Abortion. First published by Women's Press, Toronto, 1984. Re-issued by Second Story Press, 2003

=== Plays ===
- The Wolf Sisters, a work-in-progress presented at the Banff Centre PlayRites Colony, May, 2006
- The New Mother, based on a Victorian children's story by Lucy Lane Clifford. Produced by Youtheatre, Quebec tours, 2005, 2006. (Director: Michel Lefebvre)
- The Seven Ravens, adapted from the Brothers Grimm. Produced by Youtheatre, Montreal and the National Arts Centre, Ottawa, 2001 (Director: Michel Lefebvre). Remounted in 2002 for a tour of Quebec, New Brunswick and the Lorraine Kimsa Theatre for Young People, Toronto. Nominee, Dora Mavor Moore Award for Best Young Audience Production
- Foundlings, a young-audience play set in ancient Greece. Workshop/showcase produced by the Theatre Department, University of Lethbridge, Alberta, May–June, 2001 (Director: Annie Szamosi)
- Right Of Passage, a large-scale outdoor theatre work incorporating music, mask and puppetry, created in collaboration with director Anne Barber and designer Brad Harley of Shadowland Theatre. Produced by Shadowland Theatre on Toronto Island, July, 2000
- Loon Boy, young audience drama. Chalmers 1994 Canadian Children's Play Award winner. Produced by Carousel Players, 1998 (Director: James Simon); Produced by Carousel Players, 1993 (Director: Pierre Tetrault)
- Ezzie's Emerald, musical play for young audiences. Book and lyrics by Kathleen McDonnell, Music by Phyllis Cohen. Produced by Carousel Players, 1995 (Director: Pierre Tetrault)
- Unpacking, a one-act play. Produced at New Ideas Festival, Alumnae Theatre, March, 1995. (Director: Kathleen McDonnell)
- Precipitous, a one-act play. Produced by The Gathering at Theatre Passe Muraille, May, 1992. (Director: Rebecca Cann)
- The Cookie War, a comedy. Produced by the Blyth Festival, Summer, 1988. (Director: Francine Volker)
- Different, young audience drama. Shadowland Theatre, 1987 (Director: Francine Volker)
- Risk Factors, Winner, National Women's Playwriting Award, Fireweed Magazine, 1980. Produced by Equity Showcase Theatre, 1981.(Director: Tom Diamond)
