= Florence Gibson MacDonald =

Canadian playwright

- Born: Florence MacDonald
- Occupation: playwright
- Years active: 1990s-present
- Notable work: Belle, Home Is My Road

Florence Gibson MacDonald is a Canadian playwright. She is best known for her plays Belle, which was a finalist for the Dora Mavor Moore Award for Outstanding New Play in 2000 and a winner of the Floyd S. Chalmers Canadian Play Award in 2001, and Home Is My Road, which won the Carol Bolt Award in 2004.

Her other plays have included Missing, i think i can, How Do I Love Thee?, Augury and Love Handles, as well as radio plays for CBC Radio.

Formerly a medical doctor, Gibson wrote several short plays which were produced on the fringe festival circuit before her success with Belle, her first full-length play. She then devoted herself to full-time writing.
