= Margaret Hollingsworth =

Canadian writer (born 1942)

- Born: 1942 (age 83–84); Sheffield, England
- Occupations: dramatist, novelist, short stories
- Writing career
- Period: 1970s–present
- Notable works: Ever Loving, War Babies, Islands

Margaret Hollingsworth (born 1942) is a Canadian writer. Best known as a playwright, she has also published a novel and short stories.

== Background ==
Born in Sheffield, England, she grew up in Sheffield and London, and was educated as a librarian at Loughborough College. She emigrated to Canada in 1968, studying psychology at Lakehead University in Thunder Bay, Ontario before moving to Vancouver, British Columbia to study creative writing and theatre at the University of British Columbia. She became a Canadian citizen in 1974.

== Work ==
Her first play, Bushed, was staged by the Vancouver Playhouse Theatre Company in 1973. She followed up with Operators in 1974 and Alli Alli Oh in 1977.

She was a winner of the Floyd S. Chalmers Canadian Play Award in 1983 for Ever Loving, and the Jessie Richardson Theatre Award in 1995 for Ring of Fire. She was an ACTRA Award nominee for Best Radio Writer in 1979 for her radio play War Games, a nominee for the Governor General's Award for English-language drama in 1985 for War Babies, and a two-time nominee for the Dora Mavor Moore Award for Outstanding New Play in 1986 for Islands and in 1987 for War Babies.

Her other plays have included Apple in the Eye, Diving, The House That Jack Built, It's Only Hot for Two Months in Kapuskasing, Poppycock, Prim and Duck, Mama and Frank, In Confidence, and Spanish Dancing in a Cold Climate.

She published the short story collection Smiling Under Water in 1990, and the novel Be Quiet in 2004.
