= John Lazarus (playwright) =

Canadian playwright (born 1947)

John Lazarus (born 1947) is a Canadian playwright.

He is author of Babel Rap, Dreaming and Duelling, The Late Blumer, Homework & Curtains, Genuine Fakes, The Trials of Eddy Haymour, Medea's Disgust, Village of Idiots, Rough Magic, Meltdown, Exposure and Secrets.

Lazarus is also the author of many plays for young audiences, including the four-play anthology Not So Dumb.

Lazarus graduated from the National Theatre School of Canada in 1969, then moved to Vancouver, British Columbia where he worked for 30 years as an actor, critic, broadcaster, playwright, screenwriter and teacher at Studio 58 and Vancouver Film School. In 2000 he moved to Ontario to join the Department of Drama at Queen's University. Since then, he has often worked with Theatre Kingston. He retired from Queen's in 2021, and has since written the book "Two Ways About It: The Inside and Outside of Playwriting".
