= George F. Walker =

Canadian playwright and screenwriter (born 1947)

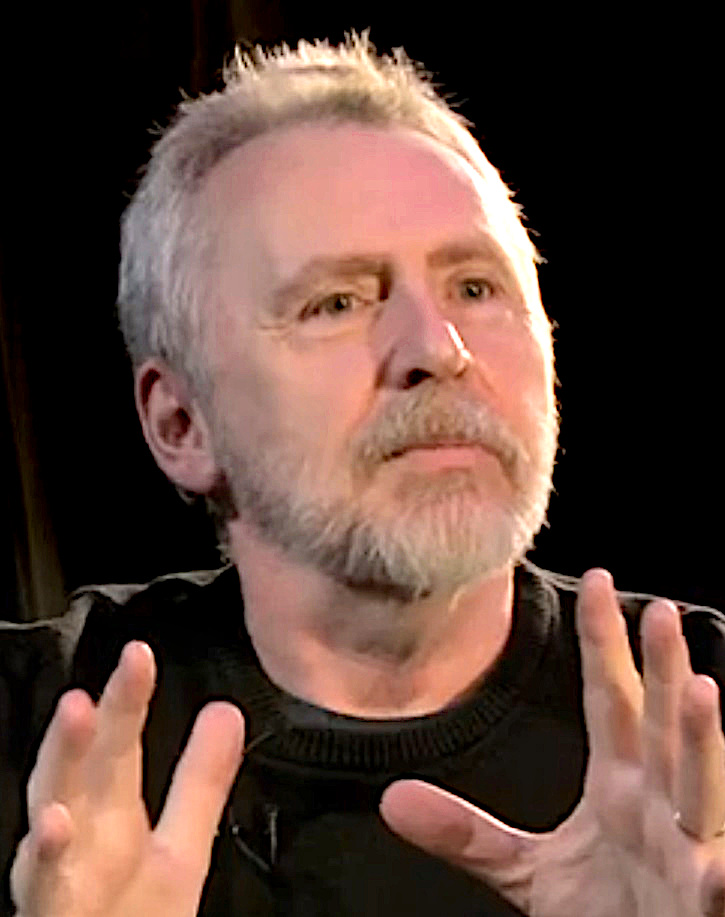
- Walker in 2012
- Born: August 23, 1947 (age 79); Toronto, Ontario
- Occupations: Screenwriter, Playwright
- Spouse: Susan Purdy
- Website: georgefwalker.ca

George F. Walker (born August 23, 1947) is a Canadian playwright and screenwriter. He is one of Canada's most prolific playwrights, and also one of the most widely produced Canadian dramatists both in Canada and internationally.

== Early years ==
Walker was born in Toronto, Ontario, on August 23, 1947, to Florence and Malcolm Walker. He was raised in the east end of Toronto, which was considered a working-class neighbourhood. This neighbourhood is what made him loyal to the city lifestyle, which is shown in his work later on in life.

He attended Riverdale Collegiate Institute but did not graduate from high school. After he dropped out of high school he worked a variety of different jobs, and while doing these jobs he had been writing many stories and poems. When working at a job as a taxi driver he saw a pamphlet from the Factory Theatre Lab inviting scripts to be submitted.

== Career ==
Walker has written over 30 stage scripts and has also written many television shows, radio shows, and also some movies. Some of the television shows that he had written for were Due South, The Newsroom, This is Wonderland, The Line and Living in Your Car, and the film Niagara Motel. Most of his screen projects are cowritten with Dani Romain.

Walker was first known for his playwriting. In 1997, he published a cycle of six new plays, all of which took place in the same suburban motel room. He wrote plays for most of his career but since 2000 he has worked more in television and film.

His 1977 play Zastrozzi, The Master of Discipline was featured in the 2009 season of the Stratford Shakespeare Festival at the Studio Theatre.

In 2006, he was made a Member of the Order of Canada. In 2009, he received the Governor General's Performing Arts Award for Lifetime Artistic Achievement, Canada's highest honour in the performing arts.

== Plays ==
- Prince of Naples (1971)
- Ambush at Tether's End (1971)
- Sacktown Rag (1972)
- Bagdad Saloon (1973)
- Beyond Mozambique (1974)
- Ramona and the White Slaves (1976)
- Gossip (1977)
- Zastrozzi, The Master of Discipline (1977)
- Filthy Rich (1979)
- Rumors of Our Death (1980)
- Theatre of the Film Noir (1981)
- Science and Madness (1982)
- The Art of War (1983)
- Criminals in Love (1984)
- Better Living (1986)
- Beautiful City (1987)
- Nothing Sacred (1988)
- Love and Anger (1989)
- Escape from Happiness (1991)
- Tough! (1993)
- Suburban Motel (1997): Problem Child, Criminal Genius, Risk Everything, Adult Entertainment, Featuring Loretta, The End of Civilization
- Heaven (2000)
- And So It Goes... (2010)
- King of Thieves (2010)
- Dead Metaphor (2013)
- The Burden of Self Awareness (2014)
- The Ravine (2014)
- Parents Night (2014)
- The Bigger Issue (2015)
- We the Family (2015)
- The Crowd (2016)
- The Damage Done (2016)
- The Chance (2017)
- Fierce (2018)
- Kill the Poor (2018)
- Orphans for the Czar (2022)

== Works about George F. Walker ==
- Chris Johnson, Essays on George F. Walker: Playing with Anxiety. Winnipeg: Blizzard Publishing, 1999
- Craig Walker, "George F. Walker: Postmodern City Comedy," The Buried Astrolabe: Canadian Dramatic Imagination and Western Tradition. Montreal: McGill-Queen's University Press
- (in German) Sabine Schlüter: Das Groteske in einer absurden Welt. Weltwahrnehmung und Gesellschaftskritik in den Dramen von George F. Walker. Königshausen & Neumann, Würzburg 2007
