= List of Canadian plays (G–O) =

Canadian plays online and in paper book form

Canadian plays have been written since the 19th century, both in English and in French. The present list comprises plays in English, some of which being translations from French Canadian plays. Full length and one act plays are included but not musicals.

The Playwrights Guild of Canada has a large list of titles of copyrighted plays, included in the present one, mostly their own publications or those of Playwrights Canada Press. The year of the playbook in the present list corresponds to the printed form, but when this information is unavailable, it corresponds to the first stage production. In rare cases, neither is available.

In addition to traditional forms, Canada has a vibrant non-traditional theatre scene with notable experimental, fringe, and other alternative forms, the largest fringe festival in North America being the Edmonton International Fringe Festival.

== G ==
- Gabe by Carol Bolt
- The Gadget by Rex Deverell
- Galileo Galilei by Robert Lalonde
- Gameshow by Michael E Rose
- The Garage Sale by David King
- Gargoyle by Robin Fulford
- Garrison's Garage: Encounters with Revenue Canada by Ted Johns
- Gay for Pay with Blake & Clay by Curtis Campbell and Daniel Krolik
- The Gay Heritage Project by Damien Atkins, Andrew Kushnir and Paul Dunn
- Genesis: The Mary Shelley Play by Mary Humphrey Baldridge
- Gently Down the Stream by Aviva Ravel
- Genuine Fakes by John Lazarus
- Geometry by Rachel Wyatt
- Georama by Jackie Torrens
- Gideon's Blues by George Boyd
- Generations by Sharon Pollock.
- Geography Match by James Reaney
- The Gift by Anne Chislett
- The Giant's Garden by Scott White
- A Gingerbread House by Janice Wiseman
- The Ginkgo Tree by Lee MacDougall
- The Girl in the Flower Basket by Shirley Barrie
- Girl in the Goldfish Bowl by Morris Panych
- The Girl on the Mountain by Dorothy Lees-Blakey
- The Girl Who Loved Her Horses by Drew Hayden Taylor
- The Girls in the Gang by Raymond Storey
- The Glace Bay Miners' Museum by Wendy Lill (adapted from the novel by Sheldon Currie)
- Glengarry School Days by Anne Chislett
- Glass Castles by Lindsay Price
- Glenn by David S. Young
- The Glassblower's Children by Michael Shepherd
- Global Village by Rick McNair
- Gloria Star by Michel Tremblay
- The Glorious 12th by Raymond Storey
- God and the Indian by Drew Hayden Taylor
- A God in Need of Help by Sean Dixon
- Going Down for the Count by Peter Elliot Weiss
- Going Down the River Going Down the River by Kevin Longfield
- Gold Mountain Guest by Simon Johnston
- The Golden Cod by Jeff Pitcher
- The Golden Goose by Gwen Pharis Ringwood
- The Golem of Prague by Gabriel Emanuel
- Gone To Glory by Suzanne Finlay
- Goodbye by Aviva Ravel
- Good-bye and Keep Cold by Donn Short
- Goodbye Cruel World by Warren Graves
- Goodbye Marianne by Irene N. Watts
- Goodbye, Piccadilly by Douglas Bowie
- The Good Egg by Michael MacLennan
- Good Mother by Damien Atkins
- Good Neighbours by Irene N. Watts
- Goodness by Michael Redhill
- Goodnight Desdemona (Good Morning Juliet) by Ann-Marie MacDonald
- Goodnight Disgrace by Michael Mercer
- The Goodnight Bird by Colleen Murphy
- Goose Spit by Viviene Laxdal
- Gordon by Morris Panych
- Goya by Henry Beissel
- Grace by Michael MacLennan
- Grace Under Pressure by Betty Jane Wylie
- Granma's Stockings by Laurent Goulet
- Grand Tirade at the Town Hall by Henry Beissel
- Gravediggers of 1942 by Tom Hendry
- Gravel Run by Conni Massing
- The Gray Zone by Benj Gallander and Jaromir Novak
- Great Expectations by Michael Shamata
- The Great School Crisis: The Tory Revolution in Ontario's Schools by Ted Johns
- The Great Wave of Civilization by Herschel Hardin
- The Great Zanderthon Takeover
- Green Dating by Chantal Bilodeau
- The Green Line by Makram Ayache
- Greenpieces by Mark Leiren-Young
- The Groanin' Board by John Gounod Campbell
- Grounded by John Spurway
- Ground Zero by Brian Shein
- La Guerre, Yes, Sir! by Roch Carrier
- A Guide to Mourning by Eugene Stickland
- Gulag by Robin Fulford
- The Gull by Daphne Marlatt

== H ==
- Habitat by Judith Thompson
- The Half of It by John Krizanc
- Halo by Josh Macdonald
- Hamish by Michael Grant
- Hamlet – Who Cares? by Rick McNair
- Hammer and Tongs by Jane Gilchrist
- Hana's Suitcase on Stage by Emil Sher
- The Hand That Cradles The Rock by Warren Graves
- Hands by C. E. Gatchalian
- Hands of Healing: The Story of Dr. Locke by Ted Johns
- Happiness Hunting by Bo Anderson
- Happily Ever After by Elliott Hayes
- Happy: A Very Gay Little Musical by Sky Gilbert
- Happy Holly by Beth McMaster
- Happy Place by Pamela Mala Sinha
- Harbour House by David King
- Hard Hearts by Elliott Hayes
- Harlem Duet by Djanet Sears
- The Harps of God by Kent Stetson
- Harun by Makram Ayache
- Harvest by Ken Cameron
- The Harrowing by Scott Douglas
- Harry Oddstack and the Case of the Missing King by Rex Deverell
- Hashisch by Gordon Armstrong
- The Haunted Castle by Beth McMaster
- The Head, Guts and Soundbone Dance by Michael Cook
- The Heart Specialist by John Gounod Campbell
- Heart to Heart by Barbara Novak
- Hearts and Soles by Jaan Kolk
- Heartspent by Michael Melski
- Heaven by George F. Walker
- Heaven's Gates, Hell's Flames by a group of authors
- Hedda Gabler by Judith Thompson
- Hedges by Dave Carley
- Heidi by Dorothy Lees-Blakey
- Hellfire Pass by Vittorio Rossi
- Henry III of Franceby Robert Lalonde
- Heracles by Dennis Foon
- Here Lies Henry by Daniel MacIvor
- Here on the Flight Path by Norm Foster
- The Hero by Rose Scollard
- Heroine by Karen Bassett
- her only customer... by Celia McBride
- Hester: An Introduction by Sky Gilbert
- He Won't Come In from the Barn: An Agricultural Comedy by Ted Johns
- Hideous Hideous by Emil Sher
- High-Gravel-Blind by Paul Dunn
- High Life by Lee MacDougall
- Hitching a Ride by Celia McBride
- Hoarse Muse by Paddy Campbell
- The Hobbit by Kim Selody
- Hockey Dad: A Play in 3 Periods by Stephen Waldschmidt and James Popoff
- Hockey Mom, Hockey Dad by Michael Melski
- Hooking for Paradise by Sharon Stearns
- Holy Mo and Spew Boy by Lucia Frangione
- Homage by Daniel R. Lillford
- Homechild by Joan MacLeod
- Home for the Funeral by Rachel Wyatt
- Home Free by Seymour Blicker
- Home is my Road by Florence Gibson MacDonald
- Homesick by Conni Massing
- Homeward Bound by Elliott Hayes
- Homework & Curtains by John Lazarus
- Honky Tonk Angels by Paul Ledoux
- The Honourable Member by Jeff Pitcher
- The Hooves Belonged to the Deer by Makram Ayache
- Hope and Caritas by Ian Weir
- The Hope Slide by Joan MacLeod
- Horns by Aviva Ravel
- The Horsburgh Scandal: The Play by Betty Jane Wylie
- Horseplay by Peter Anderson and Phil Savath
- Hosanna by Michel Tremblay
- Hot Flashes by Paul Ledoux
- The Hours That Remain by Keith Barker
- House by Daniel MacIvor
- House of Glass by Clem Martini
- House of Weasels by Kico Gonzalez-Risso
- The House That Jack Built by Margaret Hollingsworth
- How Are Things With the Walking Wounded? by Tom Hendry
- How Could You, Mrs. Dick? by Douglas Rodger
- How to Speak Male by Betty Jane Wylie
- Huff by Cliff Cardinal
- The Hum by Robert Tsonos
- Hunger by Hope McIntyre
- Hunter of Peace by Sharon Stearns
- Hunting Stuart by Robertson Davies
- Hurrah for Willoughby D! by Janice Wiseman

== I ==
- I Am Marguerite by Shirley Barrie
- I Am Yours (play) by Judith Thompson
- I Can't Feel the Rain by Tom Slater
- Ice: Beyond Cool by John Lazarus
- I, Claudia by Kristen Thomson
- I Fell in Love with an Eel by Vern Thiessen
- I Forgive You by Scott Jones and Robert Chafe
- I Have Seen Beautiful Jim Key by Janet Munsil
- I Love You, Baby Blue by Paul Thompson
- I Met a Bully on the Hill by Maureen Hunter
- Icetime by Carol Bolt
- The Idler by Ian Weir
- If Betty Should Rise by David Demchuk
- If I'd Been There... by Daniel Libman
- If We are Women by Joanna McClelland Glass
- If We Were Birds by Erin Shields
- If You Really Love Me... by Mark Leiren-Young
- Illegal Entry by Clem Martini
- The Illegal Playwriting Class by John Lazarus
- Improvisations for Mr. X by Henry Beissel
- Impromptu on Nun's Island by Michel Tremblay
- The Impromptu of Outremont by Michel Tremblay
- I'm Still Here by Ramona Baillie
- In Absentia by Morris Panych
- In a World Created by a Drunken God by Drew Hayden Taylor
- In Confidence by Margaret Hollingsworth
- Indian Heart by Ed Schroeter
- Indian Heart by Ed Schroeter
- In Dreams by Alan Williams
- Inexpressible Island by David Young
- Influence by Janet Munsil
- Ingenious Speculations by Kim Selody
- The Inner City Dead by Angus Kohm
- In on It by Daniel MacIvor
- Interface by Stephen Near
- In the Eyes of God by Raul Sanchez Inglis
- Ingenious Speculations by Jan Derbyshire
- In the Lobster Capital of the World by Don Hannah
- In the Midst of Death by Shirley Barrie
- Intimate Betrayal by Tom Slater
- Inside the Sand Castle by David Belke
- The Inmates by Dan Daniels
- Innocence Lost: A play about Steven Truscott by Beverley Cooper
- Insomnia by Guillermo Verdecchia
- Inspector Sly's Second-to-Last Case by Kico Gonzalez-Risso
- Intimate Admiration by Richard Epp
- Into by Dave Carley
- Inuk by Henry Beissel
- Inuk and the Sun by Henry Beissel
- The Investigation Into The Strange Case Of The Wildboy by Sky Gilbert
- In Which Pier Paolo Pasolini Sees His Own Death in the Face of a Boy: A Defacement in the Form of a Play by Sky Gilbert
- In Piazza San Domenico by Steve Galluccio
- In the Eyes of Stone Dogs by Daniel Danis
- The Investigator by Reuben Ship
- Invisible Kids by Dennis Foon
- The Irish Connection by Jeff Pitcher
- Is it true what they're sayin' 'bout you? by Daniel R. Lillford
- The Island of Bliss by Ian Weir
- The Island of Demons by George Woodcock
- Islands by Margaret Hollingsworth
- It Is Solved By Walking by Catherine Banks
- It's Only Hot for Two Months in Kapuskasing by Margaret Hollingsworth

== J ==
- Jacob's Wake by Michael Cook
- Jack Sheppard's Back by Shirley Barrie
- Jake's Place: The Politics of a Marginal Man by Ted Johns
- Jason by Betty Jane Wylie
- Jasper Station by Norm Foster
- The Jealous Cellist by Kico Gonzalez-Risso
- Jehanne of the Witches by Sally Clark
- Jelly Belly Makes Garbage Delight of Alligator Pie by Kim Selody
- Je Me Souviens by Lorena Gale
- Jennie's Story by Betty Lambert
- Jenny's House of Joy by Norm Foster
- Jephthah's Daughter by Charles Heavysege
- Jessie's Landing by John Spurway
- Jessica by Linda Griffiths
- Jewel by Joan MacLeod
- Jigsaw by Carol Libman
- The Jigsaw Puzzle by Ann Snead
- Jim by Mark Leiren-Young
- Jim Dandy by Sky Gilbert
- Jitters by David French
- Job's Wife by Yvette Nolan
- Joe Beef by David Fennario
- Joey Shine by David King
- Johannes Kepler by Robert Lalonde
- Johannes Reuchlin and the Talmud by Basya Hunter
- John Doe/Jack Rabbit by Neil Fleming
- Johnny Mangano and His Astonishing Dogs by Michel Tremblay
- Joint Bequest by Marilyn Boyle
- Joke You by Jan Derbyshire
- Journeys by Maxim Mazumdar
- Juba by Stephen Burge Johnson
- Judas Noir by Leighton Alexander Williams
- Jumping Mouse by Marion de Vries
- A Jungle out There by Michael Riordon
- Jupiter in July by Norm Foster
- Just Another Day Just Another Day by Angus Kohm.
- Just a Minute by Irene N. Watts

== K ==
- Kafka by Brian Shein
- Karla and Grif by Viviene Laxdal
- Kayak by Jordan Hall
- Keeper of the Light by Jeff Pitcher
- Kidvid by Anna Fuerstenberg
- A Killing Snow by Paul Ciufo
- Kill Me Now by Brad Fraser
- Kill Them by Paul Ledoux
- Kill Your Parents in Viking, Alberta by Bryce Hodgson and Charlie Kerr
- Kim's Convenience by Ins Choi
- The King of Ireland's Son by Paula Wing
- The King of the Beavers by Sam Scribble
- King of the Castle by Tom Slater
- King of Thieves by George F. Walker
- Kingsayer by Betty Jane Wylie
- Kiss the Moon, Kiss the Sun by Norm Foster
- The Kite by W.O. Mitchell
- Knock, Knock by Rachel Wyatt
- The Known Soldier by Jeff Pitcher
- The Komagata Maru Incident by Sharon Pollock.
- Kreskinned by Michael Healey and Kate Lynch
- Kristallnacht by Richard Epp

== L ==
- Labour Unions, The Brotherhood of Mothers by Jan Derbyshire
- The Lady Smith by Andrew Moodie
- La Petite Injustice by Aviva Ravel
- The Land Acknowledgement, or As You Like It by Cliff Cardinal
- Larger than Life: The Musical by SG Lee
- The Last Bus by Raymond Storey
- The Last Days of Paul Bunyan by Dennis Foon
- The Last Drop by Kim Selody
- The Last Liberal by Dave Carley
- The Last Real Summer by Warren Graves
- Last Rites by Leslie Hamson
- The Last Resort by Norm Foster
- The Last Romantics by Michael MacLennan
- Last Stop For Miles by Celia McBride
- The Last Supper by Hillar Liitoja
- The Late Blumer by John Lazarus
- Late Company by Jordan Tannahill
- Laund-O-Mat at the End of the World by Peter Gruner
- Laura Secord by Sarah Anne Curzon
- Law of the Land by Peter Anderson
- Lawrence & Holloman by Morris Panych
- Leaning over Railings by Michael MacLennan
- Learning to Live with Personal Growth by Arthur Milner
- Leave It The Way You Found It by Tom MacGregor
- Leave of Absence by Lucia Frangione
- Leaving Home by David French
- A Legal Puzzle by W.A. Tremayne
- Legends of King Solomon by Aviva Ravel
- The Leisure Society by François Archambault
- Leo by Rosa Labordé
- Lesser Demons by Dorothy Dittrich
- Let's Hear it for Christmas by Beth McMaster
- Let's Make a World by Len Peterson
- Letters to My Grandma by Anusree Roy
- Liar by Brian Drader
- Liars by Dennis Foon
- Lies my Father Told me by Ted Allan
- Life After God: The Play by Michael MacLennan
- Life and A Lover by Natalie D. Meisner
- Life as a Fly by Margaret Matulic
- Life Coach by David King
- History of the African Elephant by Clem Martini
- A Life in the Movies by Rick McNair
- Life on Mars by Elliott Hayes
- Life Science by Morris Panych
- Life without Instruction by Sally Clark
- Lig & Bittle by Elyne Quan
- The Lights of North America by David King
- Lilies by Michel Marc Bouchard
- Lillie by Irene N. Watts
- Lilly, Alta. by Kenneth Dyba
- A Line in the Sand by Guillermo Verdecchia and Marcus Youssef
- Listen to the Wind by James Reaney
- A Little Bird Told Me by Nelles Van Loon
- Little blood brother by Vittorio Rossi
- A Little Happiness by Ramona Baillie
- Little Red Riding Hood by Nelles Van Loon
- Little Sister by Joan MacLeod
- A Little Something to Ease the Pain by Rene Aloma
- Lion in the Streets by Judith Thompson
- Listen to the Drum by Irene N. Watts
- Little Sister by Joan MacLeod
- Live! Nude! Animal! by Jackie Torrens
- Live on Stage Uncensored by Tom Slater
- Lodge by Gwen Pharis Ringwood
- Lois After Death by Rachel Wyatt
- Lokkinen by Barbara Sapergia
- Lola Starr Builds Her Dream Home by Sky Gilbert
- The Long Weekend by Norm Foster
- Loon Boy by Kathleen McDonnell
- Louis and Dave by Norm Foster
- Lost and Found by Dan Daniels
- Lost Souls and Missing Persons by Sally Clark
- Love and Anger by George F. Walker
- Love and Deception by Timothy Findley
- Love and Ruins by Rachel Wyatt
- Love and War Western Style by Rose Scollard
- Love is Strange by Paul Ledoux
- Love List by Norm Foster
- Lovers and Liars by Kim Selody
- Lovesong by Robin Fulford
- Looooove (formerly Amooooor) by Pierre Bokor
- Lucy by Damien Atkins
- Lucky Strike by Hrant Alianak
- Lust's Dominion by Robert Lalonde
- Lysistrata by Peter Anderson

== M ==
- MacGregor's Hard Ice Cream and Gas by Daniel Macdonald
- Madame Chairman by Warren Graves
- Mad Boy Chronicle by Michael O'Brien
- Made in Italy by Farren Timoteo
- Madeleine by Laurent Goulet
- Madonna of the Wilderness by Katherine Koller
- Madwitch by Paddy Campbell
- The Magic Transistor: A Purim Play by Aviva Ravel
- Maggie's Getting Married by Norm Foster
- Maggie and Pierre by Linda Griffiths
- Maggie's Last Dance by Marty Chan
- The Magic Sieve by Irene N. Watts
- Magpie by Katherine Koller
- Maharani and the Maple Leaf by Jan Derbyshire
- Mahmoud by Tara Grammy and Tom Arthur Davis
- La Maison Suspendue by Michel Tremblay
- Makeover by Evan Tsitsias
- The Malaysia Hotel by Laurie Fyffe
- The Maltese Bodkin by David Belke
- Mambo Italiano by Steve Galluccio
- A Man with a View by Angus Kohm
- Mandarin Oranges II by Rex Deverell
- The Man from the Capital by Colin Heath
- Man 2 Man by Kwame Stephens
- The Man Who Collected Women by Rose Scollard
- The Man Who Shot Chance Delaney by Ian Weir
- The Man who Went by W.A. Tremayne
- Many Happy Returns by Michael Shepherd
- Maple Lodge by Colleen Curran
- Marcel Pursued by the Hounds by Michel Tremblay
- A Marginal Man by Yvette Nolan
- Marguerite de Roberval by Shirley Barrie
- Marina, le dernier rose aux joues by Michèle Magny
- Marion Bridge by Daniel MacIvor
- Mark by Betty Jane Wylie
- The Marriage of Rodeo by Mark Melymick
- Martha's Magic by Irene N. Watts
- Martin Yesterday by Brad Fraser
- Martina and the Apostles by Ed Schroeter
- Master Plann by Kico Gonzalez-Risso
- Mathematics by Hrant Alianak
- Mattachine by David Demchuk
- Les Maudits Anglais by Gary Geddes
- McCarthy and the Old Woman by Rita Shelton Deverell
- McClure by Munroe Scott
- Mechanicsville Monologues by Don Laflamme
- Medea's Disgust by John Lazarus
- Medicare by Rex Deverell
- A Medieval Hun by John Louis Carleton
- Mella Mella by Gail Nyoka
- The Melville Boys by Norm Foster
- Melody Meets the Bag Lady by Rex Deverell
- Memorial by Paul Dunn
- Memories by Aviva Ravel
- Memories of You by Wendy Lill
- Mendel Fish by Aviva Ravel
- Merch the Invisible Wizard by Linda Hutsell-Manning
- The Merchants of Dazu by James DeFelice
- Merlin by Paul Ledoux
- Merlin and Arthur by Rick McNair
- Merrily, Merrily by Jack Sheriff
- The Merry Adventures of Robin Hood by Jeff Pitcher
- Metamorphosis by Talia Pura
- Metastasis: Chain of Ruin by Gordon Pengilly
- Mick Unplugged by Greg Nelson
- Midashasassesears by John Gounod Campbell
- Midlife by Eugene Stickland
- Midnight Madness by Dave Carley
- Midnight Sun by Maja Ardal
- The Mighty Carlins by Collin Doyle
- Miles from Home by Michael Melski
- The Mill by Hannah Moscovitch, Tara Beagan, Damien Atkins, and Matthew MacFadzean
- The Miller's Daughter by Chantal Bilodeau adapted from the Brothers Grimm "The Girl without Hands"
- Mindlands by W. A. Hamilton
- Minnie Trail by W.P. Wood
- The Minor Keys by David Belke
- Mirage by Gwen Pharis Ringwood
- Miriam's Well by Aviva Ravel
- Mirror Game by Dennis Foon
- Miss Chatelaine by Damien Atkins
- Miss 'n Me by Catherine Banks
- Missionary Position by Tom Hendry
- Molly Wood by John Wimbs and Christopher Richards
- Mom, Dad, I'm Living with a White Girl by Marty Chan
- The Mona Lisa Toodle-oo by Gordon Armstrong
- Monica Drew is a Kangaroo by Janice Wiseman
- Monkeyshines by Suzanne Finlay
- Moon People by Aviva Ravel
- Monsieur Moliere's French Scenes by Don Druick
- Monster by Daniel MacIvor
- The Monument by Colleen Wagner
- Moo by Sally Clark
- The Moonlight Sonata of Beethoven Blatz by Armin Wiebe
- The Moonshiners by Laurent Goulet
- Moose on the Loose by Dina Morrone
- Mordred by William Wilfred Campbell
- More Divine: A Performance for Roland Barthes by Sky Gilbert
- More Munsch! by Kim McCaw
- Morning by William Wilfred Campbell
- The Morning Bird by Colleen Wagner
- Mother Dear, You're Not Thinking Too Clear by Laurent Goulet
- Mother Country by Margaret Hollingsworth
- The Motherline by Chantal Bilodeau
- Mother Tongue by Betty Quan
- Mother Variations by Aviva Ravel
- Motifs & Repetitions by C. E. Gatchalian
- The Motor Trade by Norm Foster
- Mountain Rose by Alan R. Davis
- Mourning Dove by Emil Sher
- Mouth by Robin Fulford
- Mouthpiece by Norah Sadava and Amy Nostbakken
- Mousetown by Hrant Alianak
- Moving Out by Aviva Ravel
- The Mumberley Inheritance by Warren Graves
- Murder Game by W. E. Dan Ross
- The Murderer in the Mirror by Peter Colley
- Murmel, Murmel, Mortimer Munsch by Kim Selody
- Mustard by Kat Sandler
- My Darling Judith by Norm Foster
- My Morocco by Ken Cameron
- My Rumanian Cousin by Aviva Ravel
- The Myth of Summer by Conni Massing
- My Night With Tennessee by Sky Gilbert
- My One and Only by Ken Cameron
- My Own Private Oshawa by Jonathan Wilson
- The Mystery of Maddy Heisler by Daniel R. Lillford

== N ==
- The Naciwonki Cap by Beth McMaster
- Naked at the Opera by Tom Hendry
- Naked on the Information Highway by Jaan Kolk
- Naked on the North Shore: A Tale of Labrador by Ted Johns
- Nancy Chew Enters the Dragon by Betty Quan
- A Nanking Winter by Marjorie Chan
- Naomi's Road by Paula Wing
- Napi – The First Man by Rick McNair
- A Native of the James Family by Betty Jane Wylie
- Nativity by Peter Anderson
- Neck-Breaking Car-Hop by Stewart Lemoine
- Ned Durango Comes to Big Oak by Norm Foster
- Nellie! How The Women Won The Vote by Diane Grant
- Nellie Bly: Ten Days in a Madhouse by Beverley Cooper
- Never Judge a Book by its Cover by Seymour Blicker
- Never Swim Alone by Daniel MacIvor
- New Canadian Kid by Dennis Foon
- The New Canadian Curling Club by Mark Crawford
- Newhouse by D.D. Kugler
- The New Tereus by Robert Lalonde
- Next Year's Man of Steel by David Belke
- 1949 by David French
- Night by Hrant Alianak
- Nickel City Fifs by Alex Tétreault
- Night Light by John Lazarus
- The Night They Raided Truxxx by Paul Ledoux
- The Nightingale by John Lazarus
- A Nightingale Sang by Simon Johnston
- Nine Dragons by Jovanni Sy
- No Clowns Allowed by Bri Proke
- No Man's Land by Rahul Varma
- No More by Rick McNair
- No More Ketchup by Aviva Ravel
- No More Medea by Deborah Porter Taylor
- No Sweat by Anne Chislett
- No Tell Motel by Michael G Wilmot
- The Noble Pursuit by Douglas Bowie
- The Noose by Henry Beissel
- The Norbals by Brian Drader
- North by Greg Nelson
- North Mountain Breakdown by Paul Ledoux
- Nosy Parkers by Rose Scollard
- Nothing Sacred by George F. Walker
- Nothing to Lose by David Fennario
- Not Quite the Same by Anne Chislett
- Not so Dumb by John Lazarus
- Not Spain by Richard Sanger
- Not Wanted on the Voyage by Richard Rose and D.D. Kugler
- No’ Xya’ by David Diamond
- Nymphomaniac by Kico Gonzalez-Risso

== O ==
- Obaaberima by Tawiah M'carthy
- Obedience by Robin Fulford
- The Occupation of Heather Rose by Wendy Lill
- Odd Jobs by Frank Moher
- O.D! by Janice Wiseman
- The Odyssey by Christine Foster
- The Odyssey by Maurice Breslow
- The Odyssey by Rick Chafe
- Of the Fields, Lately by David French
- Offensive Fouls by Jason Long
- Offensive Shadows by Paul Dunn
- Office Hours by Norm Foster
- Office Party by Jaan Kolk
- The Oil Show: Legends of Petrolia by Ted Johns
- Old Flames by Karen Wikberg
- Old Love by Norm Foster
- The Old Woman and the Pedlar by Betty Jane Wylie
- Omniscience by Tim Carlson
- Once Upon a Greek Stage by Beth McMaster
- Once Upon a Time by Irene N. Watts
- Once Upon a Time in Old Westmount by Richard Ouzounian
- O'Neill by Daniel Libman
- One Potato, Two Potato by Aviva Ravel
- One Spring Morning by Cherie Thiessen
- Only Birds and Fools Fly by Kim Selody
- The Only Game in Town by Ed Schroeter
- On the Job by David Fennario
- On the Other Side of the Wall by Aviva Ravel
- One Crack Out by David French
- One Crowded Hour by Charlotte Fielden
- One Day in May by Greg Light
- One Night Stand by Carol Bolt
- One Tiger to a Hill by Sharon Pollock.
- One Man Star Wars Trilogy by Charles Ross
- The Only Living Father by Thomas J. Cahill
- Opening Night by Norm Foster
- Operators by Margaret Hollingsworth
- The Oprah Donahue Show by Mark Leiren-Young
- Orchidelirium by Dave Carley
- Organic Divide by Robin Fulford
- Orpheus and Eurydice by Sam Scribble
- Other Side of the Game by Amanda Parris
- The Other Side of the Pole by Stephen Heatley
- Oui by Andrew Moodie
- Outlaw by Norm Foster
- Out of Body by Beverley Cooper
- Outside by Paul Dunn
- Outside by Neil Fleming
- Overlaid by Robertson Davies
- Overtrick by Beth McMaster

== See also ==
- List of Canadian playwrights
- Theatre of Canada
- Canadian Stage production history
