= Bubbles Galore =

- Directed by: Cynthia Roberts
- Written by: Cynthia Roberts; Georgina Knight
- Produced by: Greg Klymkiw
- Starring: Nina Hartley; Tracy Wright; Daniel MacIvor
- Cinematography: Harald Bachmann
- Edited by: Sarah Peddie; Cynthia Roberts; Su Rynard
- Music by: Nicholas Stirling
- Production companies: Horsy Productions; Hryhory Yulyan Motion Pictures
- Release date: August 25, 1996 (MWFF)
- Running time: 94 minutes
- Country: Canada
- Language: English

Bubbles Galore is a Canadian sex comedy film, directed by Cynthia Roberts and released in 1996.

The film stars Nina Hartley as Bubbles Galore, a bisexual pornographic film actress who has decided to take control of her career by directing films. She casts Dory Drawers (Shauny Sexton) as the lead in her new film Good Girl Gone Bad, only to discover that the young woman is a virgin; she thus sets out to teach Drawers how to perform sexually in porn, only for the two women to gradually fall in love. Meanwhile, Bubbles' ex-boyfriend Godfrey Montana (Daniel MacIvor) is trying to sabotage the production because Bubbles refused to reunite with him, and her assistant Vivian (Tracy Wright) is angry because she has long carried a torch of her own for Bubbles.

The cast also includes Annie Sprinkle in a cameo role as God, and Andrew Scorer, Sky Gilbert and Hillar Liitoja in supporting roles.

The film premiered at the Montreal World Film Festival in 1996.

== Controversy ==
Although the film attracted little controversy in its initial release, it attained increased notoriety in 1999 when the Reform Party of Canada launched an attack on the government of Jean Chrétien because the film had received production funding from various government agencies, including the Canada Council for the Arts, the Ontario Arts Council, Telefilm Canada and the Ontario Film Development Corporation, with party critics demanding to know why the government was funding what it called "lesbian porn".

Heritage minister Sheila Copps stated that she was displeased, and would pursue tighter regulation on arts granting agencies, but noted that the grants had been approved by people appointed to the agency boards by the Progressive Conservative governments of Brian Mulroney and Mike Harris, not by Liberal appointees.

Roberts stated that the film was being misunderstood and mischaracterized, noting that it was a satire of the porn industry rather than a pornographic film. The film's editor Su Rynard concurred, stating that "Her films are done very well. It would be reductive and insulting to say it is pornographic. They do have sexuality in them, but they don't function in the way that porn does."

Agency appointees also defended the funding, noting that Roberts had an established track record as the director of the acclaimed drama film The Last Supper in 1994, and that the grant application had been reviewed and approved by a panel of filmmakers and professional film critics. Critics also noted that while the film had sexual content in it, it was no more pornographic than that found in the successful mainstream Canadian films Crash and Exotica. Film critic Geoff Pevere, one of the panelists who had reviewed Roberts's original grant application, additionally noted the film's "utter lack of gratuitous displays of graphic hardcore boom-boom".

Due to the controversy, Showcase quickly arranged a deal to broadcast the film on television so that Canadians could "see it for themselves", and aired the film on June 18, 1999.

== Critical response ==
Reviewing the original screening for Variety, Brendan Kelly wrote that "the pic’s hip politics, the presence of porn activist Annie Sprinkle in a droll turn as God, and the highly sellable concept of a politically correct smut film will likely allow this to make a mark in specialized settings."

On the television broadcast, Stephen Cole of the National Post wrote that "Bubbles Galore isn't the worst, or even the most obscene film ever to receive Canadian arts funding. No, that distinction still belongs to the 1980 film Circle of Two, which featured a frolic between a close-to-embalmed Richard Burton and teen freckle-face Tatum O'Neal."

Jay Stone of Southam News wrote that "there is some humour in the movie as well; indeed, it is difficult to know sometimes what is meant to be instructive and what is meant as a satire on the very type of movie we are watching." He ultimately concluded that the film and controversy were "much ado about not much".

In his 2003 book A Century of Canadian Cinema, Gerald Pratley wrote that "no one need have worried about this silly work in which several nude ladies try to make a porn picture. It's all very boring, seldom real and hard to make out in both visual and narrative terms. The outrage died and the bubbles blew away."
