= Playwrights Canada Press =

Canadian publishing house

- Status: Active
- Founded: 1984; 41 years ago
- Country of origin: Canada
- Headquarters location: Toronto, Canada
- Distribution: University of Toronto Press (Canada); Theatre Communications Group (US); Nick Hern Books (Europe & Australia)
- Publication types: Plays, Books
- Nonfiction topics: Theatre history, Critique, Biography
- Fiction genres: Drama
- Owner(s): Playwrights Guild of Canada
- No. of employees: 3
- Official website: www.playwrightscanada.com

Playwrights Canada Press is a Canadian publishing house founded in 1984 by the Playwrights Guild of Canada. It was incorporated in 2000 as an independent company.

== Notable books ==
- The Adventures of a Black Girl in Search of God, Djanet Sears (2003)
- Almighty Voice and His Wife, Daniel David Moses (1991)
- Annie Mae's Movement, Yvette Nolan (1998)
- The Crackwalker, Judith Thompson (1980)
- The December Man (L'homme de décembre), Colleen Murphy (2007)
- Drag Queens on Trial, Sky Gilbert (1994)
- The Drawer Boy, Michael Healey (1999)
- I, Claudia, Kristen Thomson (2001)
- The Last Wife, Kate Hennig (2015)
- Lilies, Michel Marc Bouchard, trans. Linda Gaboriau (1990)
- Lion in the Streets, Judith Thompson (1992)
- Maggie and Pierre, Linda Griffiths (1980)
- Mary's Wedding, Stephen Massicotte (2002)
- The Melville Boys, Norm Foster (1984)
- The Monument, Colleen Wagner (1996)
- Palace of the End, Judith Thompson (2007)
- Scorched, Wajdi Mouawad, trans. Linda Gaboriau (2005)
- This is War, Hannah Moscovitch (2015)
- Unidentified Human Remains and the True Nature of Love, Brad Fraser (1989)
- Zastrozzi, The Master of Discipline, George F. Walker (1979)

== Awards and nominations ==
Playwrights Canada Press has been nominated for 86 Governor General's Awards, 82 for English-language Drama and 4 for French to English translation, resulting in 21 wins over its 33-year history.

=== Governor General's Award for English-language Drama ===
Year	Nominated work	Author	Result
1981^{§}	Straight Ahead and Blind Dancers	Charles Tidler	Nominated
1981^{§}	Theatre of the Film Noir	George F. Walker	Nominated
1982^{§}	Clay	Lawrence Jeffery	Nominated
1982^{§}	Jennie's Story	Betty Lambert	Nominated
1984^{§}	White Biting Dog	Judith Thompson	Won
1985^{§}	Salt-water Moon	David French	Nominated
1985^{§}	Gone in the Burning Sun	Ken Mitchell	Nominated
1985^{§}	Criminals in Love	George F. Walker	Won
1986^{§}	Odd Jobs	Frank Moher	Nominated
1986^{§}	Doc	Sharon Pollock	Won
1986^{§}	Papers	Allan Stratton	Nominated
1987	Prague	John Krizanc	Won
1987	Walt and Roy	Michael D.C. McKinlay	Nominated
1988	Skin from Skin and Liars	Dennis Foon	Nominated
1990	Scientific Americans	John Mighton	Nominated
1991	The Trial of Judith K.	Sally Clark	Nominated
1991	Where is Kabuki?	Don Druick	Nominated
1992	Possible Worlds and A Short History of Night	John Mighton	Won
1992	Serpent in the Sky	Dianne Warren	Nominated
1993	The Saints and Apostles	Raymond Storey	Nominated
1994	If We Are Women	Joanna McClelland Glass	Nominated
1995	Three in the Back, Two in the Head	Jason Sherman	Won
1996	The Little Years	John Mighton	Nominated
1996	Mad Boy Chronicle	Michael O'Brien	Nominated
1996	The Monument	Colleen Wagner	Won
1997	Reading Hebron	Jason Sherman	Nominated
1997	Sled	Judith Thompson	Nominated
1998	Not Spain	Richard Sanger	Nominated
1999	The Drawer Boy	Michael Healey	Won
1999	Beating Heart Cadaver	Colleen Murphy	Nominated
2000	Alien Creature	Linda Griffiths	Nominated
2000	It's All True	Jason Sherman	Nominated
2001	Monsieur d'Eon	Mark Brownell	Nominated
2001	Building Jerusalem	Michael Redhill	Nominated
2001	An Acre of Time: The Play	Jason Sherman	Nominated
2001	The Harps of God	Kent Stetson	Won
2002	The Gwendolyn Poems	Claudia Dey	Nominated
2002	The Shooting Stage	Michael MacLennan	Nominated
2003	Rice Boy	Sunil Kuruvilla	Nominated
2003	Last Romantics	Michael MacLennan	Nominated
2003	Einstein's Gift	Vern Thiessen	Won
2004	Robert Chafe: Two Plays. Butler's Marsh, Tempting Providence	Robert Chafe	Nominated
2004	Rune Arlidge	Michael Healey	Nominated
2004	The Red Priest (Eight Ways to Say Goodbye)	Mieko Ouchi	Nominated
2005	Half Life	John Mighton	Won
2006	Cast Iron	Lisa Codrington	Nominated
2006	I Still Love You	Daniel MacIvor	Won
2006	Adapt or Die: Plays New and Used	Jason Sherman	Nominated
2007	In Gabriel's Kitchen	Salvatore Antonio	Nominated
2007	The Bombay Plays: The Matka King and Bombay Black	Anosh Irani	Nominated
2007	Leo	Rosa Laborde	Nominated
2007	The December Man (L'homme de décembre)	Colleen Murphy	Won
2008	Bone Cage	Catherine Banks	Won
2008	10 Days on Earth	Ronnie Burkett	Nominated
2008	Palace of the End	Judith Thompson	Nominated
2009	East of Berlin	Hannah Moscovitch	Nominated
2009	Talk	Michael Nathanson	Nominated
2010	Afterimage	Robert Chafe	Won
2010	Scratch	Charlotte Corbeil-Coleman	Nominated
2010	Courageous	Michael Healey	Nominated
2010	Such Creatures	Judith Thompson	Nominated
2010	lady in the red dress	David Yee	Nominated
2011	House of Many Tongues	Jonathan Garfinkel	Nominated
2011	If We Were Birds	Erin Shields	Won
2011	Gas Girls	Donna-Michelle St. Bernard	Nominated
2011	Lenin's Embalmers	Vern Thiessen	Nominated
2012	It is Solved by Walking	Catherine Banks	Won
2012	The Romeo Initiative	Trina Davies	Nominated
2012	Brothel #9	Anusree Roy	Nominated
2013	Blood: A Scientific Romance	Meg Braem	Nominated
2013	Shakespeare's Nigga	Joseph Jomo Pierre	Nominated
2014	The Secret Mask	Rick Chafe	Nominated
2014	That Elusive Spark	Janet Munsil	Nominated
2014	Age of Minority: Three Solo Plays	Jordan Tannahill	Won
2015	The Gravitational Pull of Bernice Trimble	Beth Graham	Nominated
2015	Mahmoud	Tara Grammy and Tom Arthur Davis	Nominated
2015	carried away on the crest of a wave	David Yee	Won
2016	Kill Me Now	Brad Fraser	Nominated
2016	Pig Girl	Colleen Murphy	Won
2016	A Man A Fish	Donna-Michelle St. Bernard	Nominated
2016	Concord Floral	Jordan Tannahill	Nominated
2017	1979	Michael Healey	Nominated
2017	The Colony of Unrequited Dreams	Robert Chafe	Nominated
2017	Indian Arm	Hiro Kanagawa	Won
2017	The Virgin Trial	Kate Hennig	Nominated
2018	Botticelli in the Fire & Sunday in Sodom	Jordan Tannahill	Won
2018	Gertrude and Alice	Anna Chatterton, Evalyn Parry and Karin Randoja	Nominated
2018	Paradise Lost	Erin Shields	Nominated
2018	This Is How We Got Here	Keith Barker	Nominated
2019	Other Side of the Game	Amanda Parris	Won
2019	What a Young Wife Ought to Know	Hannah Moscovitch	Nominated
2020	Guarded Girls	Charlotte Corbeil-Coleman	Nominated
2020	Quick Bright Things	Christopher Cook	Nominated
2020	Sound of the Beast	Donna-Michelle St. Bernard	Nominated
2021	Selfie	Christine Quintana	Nominated
2021	Sexual Misconduct of the Middle Classes	Hannah Moscovitch	Won
2021	Take d Milk, Nah?	Jivesh Parasram	Nominated

^{§}as Playwrights Canada

=== Governor General's Award for French to English translation ===
Year	Nominated work	Author	Result
2007	Carole Fréchette: Two Plays: John and Beatrice; Helen’s Necklace	John Murrell	Nominated
2010	Forests	Linda Gaboriau	Won
2012	The Small Room at the Top of the Stairs and Thinking of You	John Murrell	Nominated
2012	The List	Shelley Tepperman	Nominated
2019	Birds of a Kind	Linda Gaboriau	Won
2020	Amaryllis & Little Witch	Alexis Diamond	Nominated

== See also ==
- Playwrights Guild of Canada
- Theatre of Canada
- List of Canadian Plays
