= Ken McDougall =

Canadian actor (1953–1994)

Ken McDougall (1953–1994) was a Canadian actor and theatre director. Predominantly a stage actor in Toronto, Ontario, he is best known to film audiences for his performance as Chris, a dancer dying of AIDS, in the film The Last Supper; the film was an adaptation of Hillar Liitoja's 1993 stage play of the same name, in which McDougall originated the role.

As a director, he was associated with companies including Buddies in Bad Times, Platform 9 and Theatre Passe Muraille, and directed many of the early productions of plays by Daniel MacIvor and Robin Fulford. As an actor, his performances included Sky Gilbert's Suzie Goo: Private Secretary, Liitoja's Ultimate Night and David Demchuk's Mattachine. He also had a small role in Exotica as the doorman.

McDougall died of AIDS in March 1994, just four days after completing the filming of The Last Supper.

He posthumously won two Dora Mavor Moore Awards in 1994, as best director (mid-sized theatre division) for MacIvor's Never Swim Alone and as best actor (small theatre division) for The Last Supper. He also previously won a Dora in 1988 for his direction of Fulford's play Steel Kiss.
