= Betty Jane Wylie =

Canadian writer and playwright (born 1931)

- Born: Betty Jane McKenty; February 21, 1931 (age 95); Winnipeg, Manitoba
- Education: University of Manitoba
- Occupations: Screenwriter, playwright, author
- Spouse: William Tennant (Bill) Wylie
- Writing career
- Notable awards: Order of Canada

Betty Jane Wylie, CM (born February 21, 1931) is a Canadian writer and playwright.

Born Betty Jane McKenty in Winnipeg, Manitoba, she received a Bachelor of Arts degree in 1951 and a Master of Arts degree in 1952 from the University of Manitoba. Soon after graduation, she married William Tennant (Bill) Wylie and the couple raised a family of four children. The family moved from Winnipeg to Stratford, Ontario where her husband took up a position with the Stratford Festival. With his sudden death in 1972, Wylie took up writing professionally to support herself and her family.

In her book "The Write Track" she discusses how to succeed as a freelance writer in Canada. Betty Jane Wylie was a published poet first, then a puppet playwright, then a live-stage playwright for both children and adults before shifting to writing and screenwriting for television and film. She later shifted her focus to screenplays and books. Her stage plays have been produced at the Manitoba Theatre Centre, St. Lawrence Centre, National Arts Centre, Stratford Third Stage (now the Tom Patterson Theatre), Factory Theatre, Theatre Passe Muraille and Theatre Direct in Toronto, and other theatres in Canada (Saskatchewan, Alberta, NW Territories, etc. as well as various fringe festivals; in New York (AMAS Repertory Theatre), Minneapolis and Waterloo, Iowa, and in New Zealand, London, England, and South Africa. In the course of her career, she has had 36 stage plays (and musicals) produced and published about 40 books of non-fiction, biography, belles letters, poetry and cooking.

Her first TV movie, Coming of Age (co-written with Donald Martin) won two Geminis (for best supporting actors) in 1995. She was a Bunting Fellow at Radcliffe, has been named a Woman of Distinction by the YWCA, and given an Alumni Jubilee Award by the University of Manitoba where she received an honorary doctorate (D.Litt.) in May 2003.

In 2003, she was made a Member of the Order of Canada, Canada's highest civilian honor.

== Selected bibliography ==
=== Non-fiction ===
- The Write Track: How to Succeed as a Freelance Writer in Canada Second Edition, Revised and Expanded (2nd edition 2003)
- Letters to Icelanders: Exploring the Northern Soul (1999)
- Enough: Lifestyle and Financial Planning for Simpler Living
- Family: An Exploration
- Beginnings: A Book for Widows (20th anniversary edition)
- The Best Is Yet to Come - Enjoying a Financially Secure Retirement (with Christopher Cottier)
- Life's Losses (reprint of New Beginnings)
- Everywoman's Money book (with Lynne Macfarlane)
- New Beginnings: Living Through Loss and Grief
- The survival guide for widows (1977, 1984)
- All in the Family: A Survival Guide for Living and Loving in a Changing World
- Successfully Single: how to live alone and like it (1986)

=== Cookbooks ===
- Solo Chef: Recipes, Tips, Advice and Encouragement for Single Cooks
- The Betty Jane Wylie Cheese Cookbook (1984)
- Encore: The Leftovers Cookbook (1982)

=== Poetry ===
- The Better Half: Women's Voices
- Something Might Happen
- The Second Shepherds' Play (one version)

=== Belles Lettres ===
- Reading Between the Lines: The Diaries of Women
- Men! A Collection of Quotations About Men by Women

=== Biography ===
- The Book of Matthew: the story of a learning-disabled child (1984)
- The Horsburgh Scandal (play as well)

=== Inspirational ===
- Betty Jane's Diary: Lessons Children Taught Me
- Betty Jane's Diary: Passages
- Betty Jane's Diary: Holidays and Celebrations
- No Two Alike

=== Children's books ===
- John of a Thousand Faces (1983)
- Tecumseh (1982)

=== Plays ===
- Veranda
- Time Bomb
- Double Vision
- The Horsburgh Scandal (1981) with Theatre Passe Muraille
- Mark (1972)
- Jason
- Androgyne
- Angel
- Speculum
- Grace Under Pressure
- The Second Shepherds' Play
- Steps
- How to Speak Male
- Help Is on the Way (six-part series)
- A Day In the Life (two short plays, one theme)
- A Place on Earth (1982)
- Double Swap (with Michael Cole)
- Size Ten
- I See You
- An Enemy of the People: an adaptation (1962) (Ibsen's Folkefiende adapted and set in Saskatchewan)

=== Plays for children ===
- Don't Just Stand There - Jiggle! : seven puppet plays (1980)
- Kingsayer (1967)
- The Old Woman and the Pedlar (1978)

=== Radio Plays ===
- Memories of Canada
- How to Speak Male
- Sybil: A Novel for Radio
- Mountain Woman
- Victorian Spice (Award Winner)
- Betty Jane's Diary (a daily personal column, written and performed; syndicated by Berkeley Studio, Toronto, broadcast by independent radio stations in Canada)

=== Musicals/Operas ===
- Beowulf (music by Victor Davies)
- Soap Bubbles (music by Victor Davies)
- The Second Shepherds' Play (church version, music by Quenten Doolittle)
- Boy in a Cage (chamber opera, music by Ken Nichols)
- 4 five-minute operas for Tapestry New Opera Works (produced for a Lib-Lab)
- Gotcha (15-minute opera for Tapestry New Opera Works)

=== Recordings ===
- Beowulf (1974) a three-record album, issued by Golden Toad Label
- Beowulf (two-record album, Daffodil Label), and a CD

=== Television and film ===
- Women, Lifestyle, and Money 13-part series (writer/narrator host)
- Coming of Age (1993 television film, screenplay with Donald Martin)
- CrossTalk (12-part series for VisionTV, writer, facilitator, host)
- Shadow Lake (1999 movie of the week, screenplay)
- Paradise Falls (writing cred on 3 episodes in season 1)

=== Journalism ===
Wylie worked as a freelance journalist and columnist and published widely in the Canadian press and national magazines. Her work has appeared in MacLean's, Chatelaine, Homemakers, Toronto Life, Miss Chatelaine (now Flare), Calgary Magazine, Canadian Living, Performing Arts, Canadian Theatre Review, Recipes Only, Fiddlehead, Forum, Fifty Plus, Gourmet (USA), Today, The Canadian, The Icelandic Canadian, Prairie Fire, Quest, City Woman, City Magazine, Ontario Living, Leisureways, the Globe and Mail, the Toronto Star, the Winnipeg Free Press, and the Boston Globe. In 1978, she wrote a series on single women living in the city for the Toronto Star. In 1979, she wrote a series on the cost of living for widows and old age pensioners. In 1981, she wrote an investigative series "Underground in Parkdale" for the Toronto Star focusing on the living conditions of discharged psychiatric patients living in the boarding houses in the Parkdale neighborhood of Toronto.
