= Jivesh Parasram =

Canadian actor, playwright and theatre director

Jivesh Parasram is a Canadian actor, playwright and theatre director, whose play Take d Milk, Nah? was a nominee for the Governor General's Award for English-language drama at the 2021 Governor General's Awards.

Of Indo-Caribbean descent, Parasram was born and raised in Dartmouth, Nova Scotia. He later moved to Toronto, where he was founding director of the Pandemic Theatre company, and then to Vancouver, where he is currently artistic director of Rumble Theatre.

Take d Milk, Nah? was first staged in 2018 by Theatre Passe Muraille, before being published in 2021 by Playwrights Canada Press.
