= List of Canadian plays =

Canadian plays have been written since the 19th century, both in English and in French. The present list comprises plays in English, some of which being translations from French Canadian plays. Full length and one act plays are included but not musicals.

The Playwrights Guild of Canada has a large list of titles of copyrighted plays, included in the present one, mostly their own publications or those of Playwrights Canada Press. The year of the playbook in the present list corresponds to the printed form, but when this information is unavailable, it corresponds to the first stage production. In rare cases, neither is available.

In addition to traditional forms, Canada has a vibrant non-traditional theatre scene with notable experimental, fringe, and other alternative forms, the largest fringe festival in North America being the Edmonton International Fringe Festival.

- List of Canadian plays (A–F)
- List of Canadian plays (G–O)
- List of Canadian plays (P–Z)

== See also ==
- List of Canadian playwrights
- Theatre of Canada
- Canadian Stage production history
