= Blicker =

Blicker is a surname. Notable people with the surname include:

- Erik Blicker (born 1964), American musician
- Jason Blicker, Canadian actor
- Seymour Blicker (born 1940), Canadian writer
