= Extension Service =

library Extension service may refer to:

- Cooperative State Research, Education, and Extension Service (CSREES), a USDA office
- Agricultural extension services, educational services offered to farmers and other growers
- Church extension service, one church that meets at multiple locations
- MUN Extension Service, a community development program of Memorial University of Newfoundland operating from 1959-1991
