= Irene N. Watts =

German-born Canadian writer and educator (1931–2023)

- Born: Irene Naemi Kirstein; May 24, 1931
- Died: November 21, 2023 (aged 92)
- Occupation: Playwright
- Writing career
- Genre: Young adult

Irene Naemi Watts (née Kirstein, May 24, 1931 – November 21, 2023) was a German-born Canadian writer and educator.

== Early life and education ==
Irene Naemi Kirstein was born in Berlin on May 24, 1931, and lived there for seven years. She moved to the United Kingdom by way of Kindertransport and was educated in England and Wales. Watts earned degrees in English literature and modern history at Cardiff University. She married, had four children and taught elementary school. In 1968, she came with her family to Canada.

== Career ==
Irene taught at the Ermineskin reserve in Hobbema, Alberta for a year and then began directing plays for young audiences. In 1977, the family moved to Vancouver.

Watts served as head of Citadel on Wheels/Wings, an outreach program of the Edmonton Citadel Theatre, which visited schools and communities in northern Alberta and the Northwest Territories. In Halifax, she started the Young Neptune touring company and helped Tom Kerr establish the Neptune Theatre School. Watts was the founding director of the Vancouver International Children's Festival. In 2001, she was named a life member of the Playwrights Guild of Canada.

Her play Lillie, about Home Children in Canada, received first prize at the International Playwright's Forum of the International Theatre Institute. Watts has also received an Alberta Achievement Award for outstanding service to drama.

== Death ==
Watts died on November 21, 2023, at the age of 92.

== Selected works ==
- Good-Bye Marianne (1998), received the Geoffrey Bilson Award, also adapted for the stage as a one act play
- Tapestry of Hope An anthology of Holocaust Writing for Young People (2003), compiled with Lillian Boraks-Nemetz, received the Yad Vashem award for Holocaust studies
- The Golem of Prague (2009)
- Munsch at Play, Eight stage Adaptations for Young performers (2010)
- Munsch at Play Act 2: Eight More Stage Adaptions (2010)
- No Moon, young adult novel (2010), finalist for the American Library Association Book of the Year, named one of the ten best young adult historical novels by Booklist magazine
- Escape from Berlin (2013), a compilation of the young adult novels Good-Bye Marianne, Remember Me, and Finding Sophie
