= Su Rynard =

Canadian film and television director

Su Rynard (born 1961) is a Canadian film and television director, editor and video artist. She is most noted as the director of the 2005 feature film Kardia, which was the winner of the Alfred P. Sloan Foundation Feature Film Prize at the 2005 Hamptons International Film Festival.

The niece of Canadian experimental filmmakers Michael Snow and Joyce Wieland, she began her career as a video artist in the 1980s, associated with Trinity Square Video and the YYZ Gallery art collective.

In the 1990s, she had editing credits on Cynthia Roberts's films The Last Supper and Bubbles Galore, and directed the short films Signal (1993), Big Deal, So What (1995), Eight Men Called Eugene (1996), and Strands (1997), before graduating from the Canadian Film Centre in 1997. Her short films, united by themes of the relationship between science and life, were also later screened together as the anthology package Life Tests.

She released her full-length debut documentary Dream Machine, a profile of musician Roberta Michele, in 2000. She subsequently worked on various documentary television series before releasing Kardia in 2005. From 2008 to 2015, she directed numerous episodes of the documentary series Air Crash Investigation.

In 2015, she released the documentary film The Messenger, profiling the environmental threats to songbirds. In 2021, she released Duet for Solo Piano, a profile of pianist Eve Egoyan.

Her television documentary Reef Rescue, about efforts to save coral reefs from environmental destruction, was broadcast in 2020 as an episode of The Nature of Things, and in 2021 as an episode of Nova.
