= Michael Cook (playwright) =

Canadian playwright

- Born: 14 February 1933; Fulham, London, England
- Died: 2 July 1994 (aged 61); St. John's, Newfoundland and Labrador, Canada
- Occupations: Theatre reviewer and playwright
- Writing career
- Period: 1966–1987

Michael Cook (14 February 1933 – 2 July 1994) was an English-born Canadian professor at Memorial University of Newfoundland and playwright known for his plays set in Newfoundland.

== Early life ==
Cook was born in Fulham, London, England to Anglo-Irish parents. He attended boarding schools until age fifteen and joined the British Army in 1949. He served for twelve years, mostly in Asia, including Japan. He married Muriel Horner in 1951 and had eight children. Between 1962 and 1966, he attended the University of Nottingham, earning teaching qualifications.

== Career ==
After graduating in 1966, Cook left his family and moved to Newfoundland to work as a schoolteacher. In 1967, he began his career at Memorial University of Newfoundland, first as a drama specialist with the MUN Extension Service and later becoming an associate professor in the English department. Soon after arriving in Newfoundland, he wrote scripts for several radio dramas which were produced in St. John's. He also reviewed plays and wrote articles about the importance of theatre in the St. John's Evening Telegram and the Canadian Theatrical Review.

In 1970, Cook formed the amateur theatre company The Open Group with Clyde Rose and Richard Buehler and began to write plays for this group. He wrote a number of plays set in Newfoundland, beginning with Tiln, written in 1971. His best-known works are Jacob's Wake and The Head, Guts and Soundbone Dance, in which Newfoundland provides a sometimes realistic and sometimes symbolic backdrop for his poetic rendering of lives in continual conflict with natural elements. Many of Cook's plays include dialogue written in Newfoundland English.

In the mid-1970s, Cook began to spend time on Random Island and Fogo Island, marrying Madonna Decker in 1973. In 1977, he was playwright-in-residence in the Banff Playwrights Lab at the Banff Centre for the Arts. From 1982, they lived in Stratford, Ontario, where he was playwright-in-residence in 1987. He would often spend his summers on Random Island.

In 1994, while making his way to his summer home on Random Island after visiting St. John's to see a staging of The Head, Guts and Soundbone Dance, Cook became ill and died back in St. John's.

His plays have been performed throughout North America, as well Poland, Sweden, Germany, Hungary, the United Kingdom and Ireland.

== Personal life ==
Cook married three times, and fathered fourteen children, including actor Sebastian Spence by his second wife, Janis Spence, to whom he was married 1967–1973.

== Works ==
=== Stage plays ===
- The J. Alfred Prufrock Hour (performed 1968)
- Tiln (first broadcast 1971; performed 1972)
- Colour the Flesh the Colour of Dust (performed 1971; published by Simon and Pierre, 1974)
- The Head, Guts and Soundbone Dance (performed at Arts and Culture Centre, St. John's, 1973; published 1974)
- Jacob's Wake (performed at Arts and Culture Centre, St. John's, 1974; published by Talonbooks, 1975)
- Quiller (performed 1975)
- The Fisherman's Revenge (performed 1976; published by Playwrights Canada, 1985)
- Therese's Creed (performed at Centaur Theatre, Montreal, 1977). Title also variously spelled as "Terese" and "Theresa".
- Not as a Dream (performed at Dalhousie University, Halifax, 1976)
- On the Rim of the Curve (performed at Newfoundland Drama Festival, 1977)
- The Gayden Chronicles (performed 1978; published by Playwrights Canada, 1979)
- The Apocalypse Sonata (performed at Globe Theatre, Regina, 1980)
- The End of the Road (written 1981). Earlier drafts were titled All the Funny People Are Dead and The Deserts of Bohemia.
- The Great Harvest Excursion (written 1986; published 1994)

==== Compilations ====
- Quiller / Tiln: Two One-Act Plays (Playwrights Co-op, 1975)
- Tiln & Other Plays (Talonbooks, 1976). Includes Tiln, Quiller and Therese's Creed.
- Three Plays (Breakwater Books, 1977). Includes The Head, Guts and Soundbone Dance; On the Rim of the Curve; and Therese's Creed.

=== Radio plays ===
- No Man Can Serve Two Masters, first broadcast April 8, 1966
- How to Catch a Pirate, first broadcast June 8, 1966
- A Walk in the Rain, first broadcast January 18, 1967
- Or the Wheel Broken, first broadcast June 18, 1967
- A Time for Doors, first broadcast March 13, 1968
- The Truck, first broadcast August 18, 1968
- The Concubine, first broadcast February 16, 1969
- To Inhabit the Earth Is Not Enough, first broadcast September 21, 1969
- The Ballad of Patrick Docker, first broadcast November 25, 1970
- Journey into the Unknown, 1970
- There's a Seal in the Bottom of the Garden, first broadcast June 19, 1971
- Love Is a Walnut, first broadcast August 20, 1972
- Apostles for the Burning, first broadcast December 4, 1973
- Travels with Aunt Jane, 12 episodes broadcast weekly starting July 10, 1974 starring Jane Mallett
- Knight of Sorrow, Lady of Darkness, first broadcast August 10, 1976
- The Producer, the Director, 1976
- Ireland's Eye, first broadcast April 19, 1977
- The Gentleman Amateur, 1977
- The Hunter, 1981
- All a Pack o' Lies, 1981
- The Terrible Journey of Frederick Dunglass, first broadcast January 22, 1982
- The Preacher, first broadcast December 12, 1982
- The Sweet Second Summer of Kitty Malone, first broadcast June 3, 1984
- This Damned Inheritance, first broadcast November 11, 1984
- The Bailiff and the Women, first broadcast November 16, 1984
- The Ocean Ranger, first broadcast March 31, 1985
- The Saddest Barn Dance Ever Held, first broadcast April 28, 1985
- The Hanging Judge, first broadcast October 27, 1985
- The Moribundian Memorandum, 1986

=== Other ===
- In Search of Confederation, 1971, television play
- "The Island of Fire: Chapter One of a Novel in Progress". Aurora: New Canadian Writinq 1980. Ed. Morris Wolfe. Toronto: Doubleday, 1980, pp. 33–48.
