= Offensive Fouls =

Play

- Original language: English
- Written by: Jason Long
- Characters: Joey; Christine
- Subject: Basketball; Racism
- Setting: Canada

Premiere
- Date: 1999

Offensive Fouls is a Canadian play about racism written for young adults, for use in secondary schools. It was written by Jason Long.

== History and plot ==
The play premiered in 1999 and was initially produced by All Nations Theatre, the organization that commissioned Long to write the play. Hustle n' Bustle Theatre made its debut with the play in 2011. There are only two characters in the play: Joey, a 17-year-old Irish-Canadian basketball player; and Christine, his Chinese-Canadian girlfriend. The plot follows Joey as he is benched from his basketball team after Christine suspects that he was involved in a racially motivated corner-store vandalism incident. Offensive Fouls is intended for an adolescent audience.

== Reception ==
The play was written for performances in secondary schools, and has been performed throughout Alberta. Performances have also been held in Niagara Falls, Ontario, and Neptune Theatre in Halifax, Nova Scotia, as well as in Winnipeg. It was performed in Edmonton, Alberta as recently as 2011.

The dialogue has been praised for presenting "teenagers who really sound like teenagers.”

The play was nominated for a Dora Mavor Moore Award.

One reviewer remarked, "It’s not often the public gets a chance to see “what they’re teaching the kids these days,” so when you do, it behooves us to pay attention because the target audience will be calling the shots before too long."

Offensive Fouls was published in a collection of Canadian plays for young adults titled Things That Go Bump in 2009.
