= Backbencher (radio drama) =

- Genre: Radio drama
- Country of origin: Canada
- Language: English
- Home station: CBC Radio One
- Starring: Joanne Miller; Louise Renault; Cory Bowles; Deborah Allen; Jacob Robertson; Nigel Bennett; Lee J. Campbell
- Created by: Wendy Lill
- Written by: Wendy Lill; Ed Thomason; Dave Carley
- Original release: April 8, 2010 – May 16, 2011
- No. of series: 2
- No. of episodes: 20
- Website: cbc.ca/backbencher

Backbencher is a Canadian radio drama created by Wendy Lill, and primarily written by Lill, Ed Thomason and Dave Carley. It ran for two seasons (20 episodes) on CBC Radio One in 2010 and 2011. The series won a Bronze award in the Best Regularly Scheduled Drama Program (Entertainment)Category at the New York Festivals Radio Program and Promotion Awards on June 20, 2011.

== Premise ==
The series featured the trials of Nellie Gordon, a single mother paramedic who was elected against popular expectations in a federal by-election as a New Democratic Party (NDP) Member of Parliament for the fictional riding of East Nova, Nova Scotia. As a new backbencher MP, she has to learn the Byzantine intricacies of federal Canadian politics, which is complicated with her frank outspoken Maritime perspective. Furthermore, her family life is a further hurdle, with her son and mother reluctant to accept her government responsibilities. However, she finds an unexpected friend in Herb Proctor, a Conservative backbencher from an Alberta riding who is often one of Nellie's most supportive allies in Ottawa despite their differing party allegiances and occasional conflicts.

Wendy Lill served as a two-term NDP MP for Dartmouth, Nova Scotia, although she says that the series was not literally based on her own experience.

== Cast ==
The show's cast includes Joanne Miller as Nellie Gordon, Louise Renault as Nellie's parliamentary assistant Renée LeBlanc, Cory Bowles as Nellie's constituency assistant Sean Higgins, Deborah Allen as Nellie's mother Catherine, Jacob Robertson as Nellie's son Ben, Nigel Bennett as NDP leader Charlie Dunn and Lee J. Campbell as Herb Proctor.

== Scheduling ==
The first season ran from April 8 to May 27, 2010, airing Thursdays at 11:31 am and 11:05 pm local time (3:31 pm and 11:35 pm NT). This eight-episode season was rerun from January 3 to February 28, 2011, followed by a twelve-episode second season which ran from March 3 to May 16, 2011.

Downloadable audio files of the episodes have been made available via iTunes; links to the episodes are provided on the show's official website.
