= Charlotte Fielden =

Canadian novelist, playwright, actress, and poet (1932–2021)

- Charlotte Schrager, from a 1955 newspaper
- Born: Charlotte Schrager; June 5, 1932; Toronto, Ontario, Canada
- Died: February 20, 2021 (aged 88)
- Other name: Charlotte Fielden Morris
- Occupations: Writer, therapist, playwright, novelist, performer

Charlotte Schrager Fielden Morris (June 5, 1932 – February 20, 2021) was a Canadian novelist, playwright, actress and poet.

== Early life and education ==
Schrager was born in Toronto, Ontario, the daughter of Bernard Schrager and Mae Schrager. She studied at the Oakwood Collegiate Institute and the Royal Conservatory, and attended the University of Toronto.

== Theatre, film and television ==
As an actress, Fielden played Jessica in The Merchant of Venice at the Stratford Shakespeare Festival in 1955. She was featured in Frederick Spoerley's Ballad on an Overseas Theme (1960) at the Dominion Drama Festival in Vancouver, and in Mac Shoub's The Ballad of the Grass (1962). She appeared in four episodes of Shoestring Theatre on the CBC. She was a voice actor on the English dubbed versions for Claude Jutra's films Mon oncle Antoine and Kamouraska. Fielden also worked with composer Ian McAndrew on their musical Storyville. She was a founding member of both the Writers' Union of Canada and of the Playwrights Guild of Canada, and co-founder of the Melanie Theatre in Quebec.

== Publications ==
Fielden wrote for stage, television, radio, and film. Her short stories, articles and poetry were included in various anthologies, literary reviews and news publications. Her first novel was Crying As She Ran (1970), which was the beginning of her Weil Trilogy, a family saga about generations of a Toronto immigrant family. Her play One Crowded Hour (1975) won the Women Write for Theatre competition sponsored by the Playwrights Co-op in Toronto in 1976.

After retirement, Fielden began writing fulltime with Palatine Hill, a historical novel (2004) that spans over three hundred years of Canadian history, focusing on the Secord family, and centering on Niagara-on-the-Lake and the War of 1812. A Thin Place, a short story collection, was published in 2006. An Age Without A Name (2007), concluded the Weil Trilogy. A Fragrance of Thyme (2008) was her first poetry collection. Her first mystery novel was The Wolves of Positano (2010).

Fielden's second poetry collection was Beads on a Fragile String (2011). The Story of Marly Mansion (2012) was another psychological thriller, sequel to The Wolves of Positano. Travelling Together (2013) was about tree conservation and a woman on a healing journey. The Somerset Strangler (2014) was another psychological thriller and a sequel to The Story of Marly Mansion. Beholder (2015) was Fielden's third poetry collection. Ross Castle Murders (2016), the fourth book in her mystery series, is set in Ireland and centers on badger-baiting and blood-sports as well as cruelty to domestic animals.

Fielden’s last published book, Who Will Remember? (2018), was about a group of seniors who participate in a clinical trial for Alzheimer’s in Mexico. Fielden also published a play in two acts, Saving Angel, which had staged readings in 2006, in Toronto and in London, England.

== Bibliography ==
- Crying As She Ran - Macmillan of Canada, 1970
- One Crowded Hour - Playwrights' Co-op, 1976
- Palatine Hill - CFM Books, 2004
- Messages Like Memories - CFM Books, 2005
- A Thin Place - CFM Books, 2006
- Saving Angel, a play - CFM Books, 2007
- An Age Without a Name - CFM Books, 2007
- Fragrance of Thyme - CFM Books, 2008
- The Wolves of Positano - CFM Books, 2010
- Beads on a Fragile String - CFM Books, 2011
- The story of Marly Mansion - CFM Books, 2012
- Travelling Together - CFM Books, 2013
- The Somerset Strangler - CFM Books, 2014
- Beholder - CFM Books, 2015
- Ross Castle Murders - CFM Books, 2016
- Who Will Remember? - CFM Books, 2018

== Personal life ==
Charlotte Schrager married twice. Her first husband was Hubert Fielden, and her second husband was William Morris. She had two sons, Jerry and Thomas. She died in Toronto in 2021, at the age of 87.
