= Dave Carley =

Canadian playwright

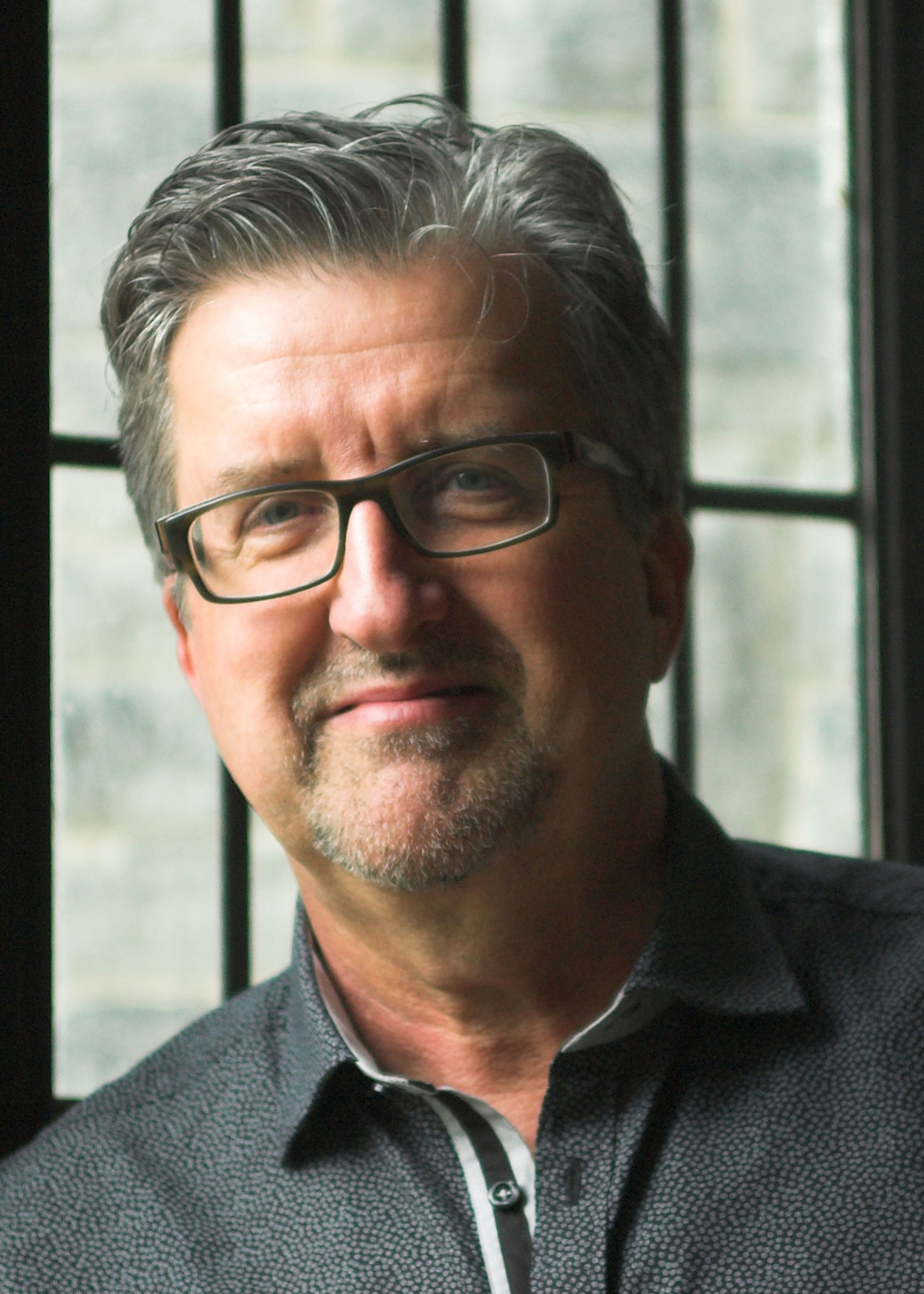

Dave Carley is a Canadian playwright who has written for stage, radio and television. His plays have had over 450 productions across Canada and the United States, and in other countries. They have won, or been nominated for, a number of awards, including the Governor General's Award (Writing with our Feet, finalist), The Chalmers Award, The Dora Award, The Arthur Miller Award (University of Michigan) and the New York International Radio Festival Award. He was an editor of The Kawartha Sun, the founding editor of the Playwrights Guild of Canada magazine, CanPlay, and also editor of Scirocco Drama in the late 1990s.

Carley was the radio drama script editor at the Canadian Broadcasting Corporation from 1990 to 2023. He was script editor for the Wendy Lill drama series Backbencher, and wrote three episodes for the second season, which began broadcast in January 2011.

Carley was born in Peterborough, Ontario, where he attended Queen Alexandra Public School and Adam Scott Collegiate and Vocational Institute. He received a Bachelor of Arts degree from The University of Toronto (University College) and an LL.B. from Queen's University in Kingston. He is an active member in a number of organizations, including Playwrights Guild of Canada and Amnesty International as well as being the Chair of the Dance and Opera Divisions for the Toronto's Dora Mavor Moore Awards.

Carley was the winner of the 2012 Maggie Bassett Award, which is given for significant and sustained contribution to theatre in Ontario. In 2022 he was inducted into the Peterborough Pathway of Fame.

Carley continues to write for the stage and a work about the death penalty, Twelve Hours, was premiered in March 2014 at the Garden Theatre in Columbus, Ohio. Twelve Hours was published by Scirocco Press in spring 2015. His stage adaptation of A Splinter of the Heart, the novel by Al Purdy, was premiered by the Festival Players of Prince Edward County in August 2016.

Carley's 2019 play, Canadian Rajah premiered in January 2019 at Campbell House, Toronto. Canadian Rajah is based on the life of Esca Brooke Daykin, eldest son of Charles Brooke, the second "White Rajah of Sarawak". Its Malaysian premiere was in October 2024, in a Masakini Theatre production at the Damansara Performing Arts Centre (DPAC) in Kuala Lumpur. The play was reviewed favourably by Malaysia's online magazine The Edge and The Juice online magazine. Canadian Rajah was published by Scirocco Drama.

Carley is the founder and curator of the Ten-Minute play component of the Port Hope Festival of the Arts. The annual Ontario Festival began in August, 2020 and features short plays in performance around the Port Hope downtown.

Carley was the co-founder in 1984 of Friends of Freddy, a literary club devoted to the work of Walter R. Brooks and, in particular, his popular Freddy the Pig series.

He is the brother of Gord Carley, author of Surviving Adversity, and lives in Toronto.

== Selected plays ==
- Hedges (1985)
- Midnight Madness (1988)
- Writing With Our Feet (1990) (finalist, Governor General's Award for Drama)
- Taking Liberties (1991) (finalist, Dora Mavor Moore Award, Best New Play); (Finalist; Chalmers Award)
- Into (1993 and 2006) (finalist, Dora Mavor Moore Award, Best New Play)
- After You (1995) (premiered as Kawartha at Alberta Theatre Projects)
- A View From The Roof (1996) (based on stories by Helen Weinzweig; finalist, Dora Mavor Moore Award, Best New Play; finalist, Chalmers Award)
- Two Ships Passing (1998)
- Walking on Water (1999)
- The Edible Woman (2000) (based on the novel, The Edible Woman, by Margaret Atwood)
- Orchidelirium (2001) (finalist, Dora Mavor Moore Award, Best New Play)
- Test Drive (2002)
- The Last Liberal (2004)
- The Final Hour (2005) (written with Glenda MacFarlane)
- Conservatives in Love (2006)
- Lucky (2006)
- Niels Ebbesen (2007) (by Kaj Munk; new English translation and adaptation, with Arense Lund)
- American Detour (2011)
- Twelve Hours (2014)
- A Splinter in the Heart (2016); adaptation of Al Purdy novel of the same name
- Canadian Rajah (2019)
