= Clem Martini =

Canadian playwright and writer (born 1956)

- Born: 1956 (age 69–70); Bowness, Alberta, Canada
- Occupations: Playwright, writer

Clem Martini (born 1956) is a Canadian playwright and writer.

== Early years ==
Clem Martini was born in 1956 in Bowness, Alberta. His parents migrated to Canada from France shortly after the Second World War ended. He grew up along with three brothers, Nicolas, Olivier and Benjamin. These brothers feature prominently in memoirs he has written (Bitter Medicine: A Graphic Memoir of Mental Illness, The Unravelling) as well as the National Film Board documentary he narrated, Shattered Dreams.

Martini is a graduate of the University of Calgary (BFA), and was among the very first playwriting cohort to graduate from the National Theatre School, (Playwriting Program) and The National Screen Institute/National Film Board (DramaLab Program).

== Career as a writer ==
Upon graduating from the National Theatre School, Martini worked for a time as the in-house writer for Insurance companies, Sovereign and Family Insurance. After two years writing copy for the company quarterlies, he left and accepted a position as playwright-in-residence at Chinook Theatre, where his plays Swimmers and Gambetta Rise were produced and performed.

Beginning in 1987 he wrote extensively for Lunchbox Theatre, (German Lesson, The Life History of the African Elephant, Nobody of Consequence, Conversations with My Neighbour's Pitbull, House of Glass, Up on the Roof, Borrow Me, Bite Me, Black Rock, Afterlife, Turnaround (with Cheryl Foggo), The Replacement, The Invention of Music)

He also wrote for Calgary's young people's theatre, Quest Theatre. Selections included The Field, Tag, The Mermaid's Three Wisdoms (adapted from Jane Yolen's book of the same name), The Secret Life of The Octopus, Mouse.

Throughout the eighties and nineties he worked closely with Alberta Theatre Projects (The Colour of Coal, A Change of Mind, Illegal Entry) as well as Workshop West Theatre (Exit Othello, Selling Mr. Rushdie)

Other produced plays include The Devil We Know with Cheryl Foggo (Blyth Festival) Jeopardy (Waterloo East Theatre Company), Bitter Medicine (SummerWorks Festival), The Troll Grandfather (Axis Theatre), and the libretto for What Brought Me Here (Calgary Opera).

In 1988 he began teaching playwriting at the University of Calgary, becoming a full-time faculty member in 1997. The Drama Department produced Martini's plays, Under The Skin, The Deck and The Mob (adapted from his novel). During his tenure at the University of Calgary he took on a number of roles including two terms as Head of Department in (2007 – 2013, 2014 – 2016), and developing and delivering a Graduate Program in Playwriting.

Clem Martini has served on the boards of numerous organizations including serving as President of The Playwrights Guild of Canada (President), and the Canadian Creative Writers and Writing Programs (founding President), Access Copyright, and Canadian Mental Health Commission.

He is presently a professor of drama at the University of Calgary.

== Plays ==
Martini studied improvisation with British educator and founder of Theatresports, Keith Johnstone, and was one of the initial members of The Loose Moose Theatre Company. Along with Kathleen Foreman, Martini compiled stories chronicling the formation of this company, and wrote the book, The Unofficial Oral History of Theatresports (Red Deer College Press)

Influenced by his children's interest in nature, he wrote the trilogy of books for young people The Crow Chronicles, which included The Mob, The Plague, and The Judgment (Kids Can Press/Bloomsbury Press). This trilogy was distributed worldwide and translated into German, Danish, Swedish, Dutch, French, Portuguese and Persian.

In 2006 he wrote the widely employed text on playwriting, The Blunt Playwright (Playwrights Canada Press). This was followed by two other companion texts, The Greek Playwright and What the Ancient Comedians Have to Say to Contemporary Playwrights (Playwrights Guild of Canada).

The Martini family were profiled in the 1988 National Film Board film about schizophrenia and suicide, titled Shattered Dreams. Clem and his brother, Olivier, have collaborated on three books about living with mental illness, Bitter Medicine: A Graphic Memoire of Mental Illness, The Unravelling, and Upside Down.

In 2018, his historical novel, The Comedian, was launched by the University of Calgary Press. This has since been translated into Italian and published as Il Commediante by Mimesis Edizioni.

== Awards and honours ==
- Fellow, The Royal Society of Canada
- Martini and his brother, Olivier Martini, received the W.O. Mitchell Book award for Bitter Medicine: A Graphic Memoir of Mental Illness, and were shortlisted for this award for their work on The Unravelling.
- National Playwriting Competition award winner, Rumours of My Crazy, Useless Life
- ATB Financial Healing Through The Arts Award
- Silver Award, National Magazine Awards
- Silver Award, Western Magazine Awards
- Best Book for Kids and Teens for Upside Down: A Family's Journey Through Mental Illness.
- Common Reading Program Selection, University of Calgary, Bitter Medicine.
- Short-listed, Red Maple Award for Children's Literature, The Mob & The Plague.
- Nominated for the Canadian Library Association Book of the Year Award for Children, for The Mob.
- Television and Screen Institute for Screenwriters, Writing for Young People Award, The Sitter.
- Short-listed for the Governor General Award for Drama, A Three Martini Lunch
- Gwen Pharis Ringwood Award for A Three Martini Lunch.
- Gwen Pharis Ringwood Award, Illegal Entry.
- National Playwriting Award, The Life History of the African Elephant.
- Gwen Pharis Ringwood Award, Nobody of Consequence.
