= Playwrights Guild of Canada's RBC Emerging Playwright Award =

Canadian playwriting award

The RBC Emerging Playwright Award (presented by Playwrights Guild of Canada as part of the annual Tom Hendry Awards) is a national playwriting competition in Canada which gives its winner a 6-month mentorship and cash prize. This award was created in 2015. It is sponsored by the Royal Bank of Canada.

== Past recipients ==
- 2015 - Rafael Antonio Renderos, Salvador
- 2016 - Rhiannon Collett, Miranda and Dave Begin Again
- 2017 - Gary Mok, we could be clouds
- 2018 - David Gagnon Walker, The Big Ship
- 2019 - Jesse LaVercombe, Hallelujah, It's Holly
- 2020 - Makram Ayache, Harun
- 2021 - Zahida Rahemtulla, The Frontliners
- 2022 - Lily Falk, Crypthand
- 2023 - Cole Hayley, The Thin Place
- 2024 - Mercedes Isaza Clunie, Gringas
