= Henry Beissel =

Canadian poet (1929–2025)

- Born: Henry Eric Beissel; 12 April 1929; Cologne, Rhine Province, Prussia, Germany
- Died: 9 January 2025 (aged 95); Ottawa, Ontario, Canada
- Education: University of Toronto
- Occupations: Writer and editor

Henry Eric Beissel (12 April 1929, Cologne, Germany – 9 January 2025, Ottawa, ON, Canada) was a Canadian writer and editor who published 24 volumes of poetry, six books of plays, a non-fiction book on Canada, two anthologies of plays intended for use in high schools, and numerous essays and pieces of short fiction.

== Life and career ==
Henry Beissel was born in Cologne, Germany, and survived the Second World War as a youth. He came to Canada in 1951.

He first came to national attention with the controversial literary/political journal Edge (Edmonton 1963 – Montreal 1969).

Beissel's internationally successful Inuk and the Sun ("a mythic masterpiece", Sherrill Grace) premiered at the Stratford Festival of Canada in 1973. This was followed by a U.S. premiere in 1977 at The Other Theatre in Chicago's Bernard Horwich Jewish Community Center with a musical score by Douglas L. Lieberman. The Other Theatre also commissioned Under Coyote's Eye and performed it at the Field Museum of Natural History. Beissel's work has been translated into many languages.

Beissel had a long teaching career in English literature, and later in creative writing, which started as a teaching fellow at the University of Toronto. He taught at LMU Munich (1960–1962), the University of Alberta (1962–1964) and Concordia University (Montreal) (1966–1996), from which he retired as distinguished emeritus professor of English.

Beissel lived with his wife, Arlette Francière, in Ottawa. He died on 9 January 2025, at the age of 95.

== Awards ==
Beissel received several awards, including the Walter-Bauer Literaturpreis, Merseburg (Germany), 1994. The first was the Norma Epstein Award for Creative Writing in 1958 at University of Toronto, and the last was the Ottawa Book Award, fiction category, in 2020 for his poetry collection Footprints of Dark Energy.

== Selected bibliography ==
- New Wings for Icarus. Toronto: Coach House, 1966.
- A Different Sun (poems by Walter Bauer translated from the German). Ottawa: Oberon, 1976.
- Inuk and the Sun. Toronto: Gage, 1980.
- Under Coyote's Eye. Dunvegan, Ontario: Quadrant, 1980.
- Improvisations for Mr. X & the Noose. Dunvegan, Ontario: Cormorant, 1989.
- Kanada. Romantik und Wirklichkeit (with photographs by Janis Kraulis). Innsbruck: Pinguin Verlag, 1981.
- Cantos North. Moonbeam, Ontario: Penumbra, 1982.
- Season of Blood. Toronto: Mosaic, 1984.
- A Thistle In His Mouth (poems by Peter Huchel translated from the German). Dunvegan, Ontario: Cormorant Books, 1987.
- The Noose & Improvisations for Mister X. Dunvegan, Ontario: Cormorant, 1989.
- Dying I was Born. Waterloo, Ontario: Penumbra, 1992.
- Stones to Harvest. Gooderich, Ontario: Moonstone, 1993.
- Across the Sun's Warp. Ottawa: BuschekBooks, 2003.
- Coming to Terms with a Child. Windsor: Black Moss Press, 2011.
- Fugitive Horizons. Toronto: Guernica, 2013.
- Sightlines. Toronto: Guernica, 2016.
- What if Zen Gardens?. Toronto: Guernica, 2017.
- Footprints of Dark Energy. Toronto: Guernica, 2019.

== Plays ==
- The Curve, University of Alberta, 1963
- A Trumpet For Nap, Little Angel Theatre, London, England. 1970
- Are You Afraid of Thieves?, Universite du Quebec, 1973, La Troupe Brin'si
- Inook And The Sun, The Stratford Festival, Canada, 1973
- For Crying Out Loud, Char-Lan Theatre Workshop, Williamstown, Ontario. 1975
- Goya, Montreal Theatre Lab, 1976
- Under Coyote's Eye, Other Theatre, Chicago, 1978
- The Emigrants, Saidye Bronfman Centre, Montreal. 1981
- Hedda Gabler, Saidye Bronfman Centre, Montreal. 1982 (translation)
- The Noose, University of Winnipeg, 1985
- The Glass Mountain, University of Winnipeg, Manitoba. 1990
