= Sally Clark (playwright) =

Canadian playwright and filmmaker

- Born: Vancouver, British Columbia

Sally Clark (born 26 July 1953 in Vancouver, British Columbia) is a Canadian playwright and filmmaker.

== Career ==
After moving to Toronto in 1973, Sally Clark served as playwright/dramaturge for Theatre Passe Muraille, the Shaw Festival, Nakai Theatre, Buddies in Bad Times Theatre and Nightwood Theatre.

Her plays have received two Dora Mavor Moore Award nominations and a Governor General's Award nomination for The Trial of Judith K. In 1990 she won the Floyd S. Chalmers Canadian Play Award for her play, Moo (1988).

Clark has also written and directed for film. Her film, Ten Ways to Abuse an Old Woman (1983), won the Special Prix du Jury at the Henri Langlois International Short Film Festival in France and another of her films, The Art of Conversation won the Bronze Award for Best Dramatic Short at the Worldfest Charleston Festival in 1993 and has been screened at several other film festivals around the world.

Other Works include:

- Jehanne of the Witches (1989)
- Life Without Instruction (1991)
- Lost Souls and Missing Persons (1984)
- Saint Frances of Hollywood (1996)
- Trial of a Ladies Man (1987)
- Wanted
- WASPS (1996)
