= The Last Supper (1994 film) =

- Directed by: Cynthia Roberts
- Written by: Greg Klymkiw; Hillar Liitoja; Cynthia Roberts
- Produced by: Greg Klymkiw
- Starring: Ken McDougall; J.D. Nicholsen; Daniel MacIvor
- Cinematography: Harald Bachmann
- Edited by: Cynthia Roberts; Su Rynard
- Music by: Nicholas Stirling
- Distributed by: British Film Institute
- Release date: 1994
- Running time: 96 minutes
- Country: Canada
- Language: English

The Last Supper is a 1994 Canadian drama film directed by Cynthia Roberts.

== Plot ==
Chris (Ken McDougall) is a dancer dying of AIDS. Before his assisted suicide, he shares a last meal with his lover Val (J.D. Nicholsen).

== Cast ==
- Daniel MacIvor as Dr. Parthens
- Ken McDougall as Chris
- J.D. Nicholsen as Val

== Production ==
The Last Supper is adapted from the theatrical play of the same name by Hillar Liitoja, first staged by Theatre Passe Muraille in 1993. McDougall originated the lead role in the stage production, opposite James Allodi as Val and Sky Gilbert as Dr. Parthens.

The film was shot in real time and set entirely in one room at Toronto's Casey House AIDS hospice. Ken McDougall died of AIDS complications four days after filming finished.

== Reception ==
The Last Supper won the Teddy Award for Best Feature Film at the 1995 Berlin International Film Festival. Time Out called the film "simple but devastating study of the human condition in extremis". Variety called it "an important addition to the growing body of pix about AIDS-related issues" but said that it may be too gruelling for some viewers.
