= William A. Tremayne =

American playwright and screenwriter

- Born: Portland, Maine, U.S.
- Died: December 3, 1939; Montreal, Canada
- Occupations: Playwright, screenwriter

William A. Tremayne (died December 3, 1939) was an American playwright and screenwriter.
