= Lilies (play) =

Lilies or the Revival of a Romantic Drama (French: Les Feluettes ou la répétition d'un drame romantique) is a play written by Quebec playwright Michel Marc Bouchard, which premiered in 1987.

== Plot ==
The play concerns the confession of an aging prisoner to a bishop. Through the confession, and the staged scenes acted out by the male prisoners in the prison chapel, we learn that the bishop and the prisoner were part of a gay love triangle, and that the bishop was responsible for the death of a young man many years ago.

== Adaptations ==
The play's English translation by Linda Gaboriau was published in 1990 by Playwrights Canada Press and staged by Théâtre Passe-Muraille in 1991, winning Dora Mavor Moore Awards for Outstanding New Play and for Outstanding Production.

The play was also made into the 1996 film Lilies, which was directed by John Greyson.

The play was later adapted as a French-language opera, Les Feluettes, with music by Kevin March and libretto by Bouchard. Co-commissioned by Opéra de Montréal and Pacific Opera Victoria, Les Feluettes premiered in Montreal in May 2016. The opera was staged in Victoria in April 2017 and at Edmonton Opera in October 2017.
