= Richard Epp (actor) =

Canadian playwright and actor

Richard Epp (born 1948) is a Canadian playwright and actor.

== Early life and career ==
Born in Prince Albert, Saskatchewan, Epp studied at the University of Saskatchewan and University of Victoria. He has been a member of the Department of Theatre and Dramatic Arts at the University of Lethbridge in Lethbridge, Alberta, since 1974. He has served as department chair and played a significant role in the development of drama programs and facilities at the University. A full professor since 1991, Epp teaches playwriting, acting, film studies, voice for the actor, and directing, and has directed a wide range of plays at the University of Lethbridge, with particular interest in the classical repertoire.

== Works ==
His own plays have been produced by Edmonton's Theatre Network, Theatre Calgary, the Stratford Festival, the Cincinnati Playhouse in the Park, CBC Radio, and several university drama departments. Plays by Richard Epp include Treasures (premiered at Lord Beaverbrook High School, Calgary, 1981, directed by Peter Spear, winner of the Alberta Culture Playwriting Competition, full-length play, 1978), Christmas Pudding (Southern Stage, Lethbridge, 1982, Sharon Bakker), Kristallnacht (Theatre Network, 1986, Gerry Potter), Intimate Admiration (Theatre Calgary, 1986, John Bluethner and Stratford Festival, 1987, John Wood), Japango (Cincinnati Playhouse in the Park, 1992, Kent Stephens), Winter Pond, first performed at University of Lethbridge, 1997.
