= One Man Star Wars Trilogy =

2001 Off-Broadway play by Charles Ross

- Written by: Charles Ross
- Based on: Star Wars
- Original language: English
- Genre: parody

Premiere
- Date premiered: 2001
- Place premiered: Canada
- Official website

One Man Star Wars Trilogy is an Off-Broadway play based on the original Star Wars trilogy, written and performed by Canadian actor Charles Ross, and directed by TJ Dawe. It premiered in Toronto, Ontario, in January 2001.

== One man play ==
First performed at the Pavilion Theatre in Kamloops, British Columbia, Canada, the play runs for 75 minutes (although earlier incarnations lasted for one hour) and has only one cast member. Ross plays all the characters, recreates the effects, and sings from the John Williams score. The inspiration came from playing a frisbee game with friends, in which the thrower would say a line from the movies, and the catcher had to say the following line while catching.

The show is licensed by Lucasfilm. Charles Ross has also used the concept with other film trilogies, including "One Man Lord of the Rings", which was performed from 2004 to 2005. Ross was asked to stop performing by the intellectual property holder. The legal issues have since been resolved, and he performed the "One Man Lord of the Rings" show at the 2009 Edinburgh Fringe.

Ross has reportedly seen the original trilogy over 400 times.

== Performances ==
One Man Star Wars Trilogy has toured and appeared on several television shows, including NBC's Late Night with Conan O'Brien and CBS's Late Late Show. Ross also performed the show for Vin Diesel and the rest of the cast on the set of The Chronicles of Riddick.

Ross performed the show in 2004 at the 62nd World Science Fiction Convention masquerade half time show, at Star Wars Celebrations III and IV, and the 2004 San Diego Comic-Con.

In August 2005, Ross performed the show in Lamb's Theatre, Off-Broadway, in New York City.

He also hosted a month-long sold-out run at the Edinburgh Fringe in the E4 Cow Barn in 2006.
