= Royal Manitoba Theatre Centre =

Theatre in Winnipeg, Manitoba, Canada

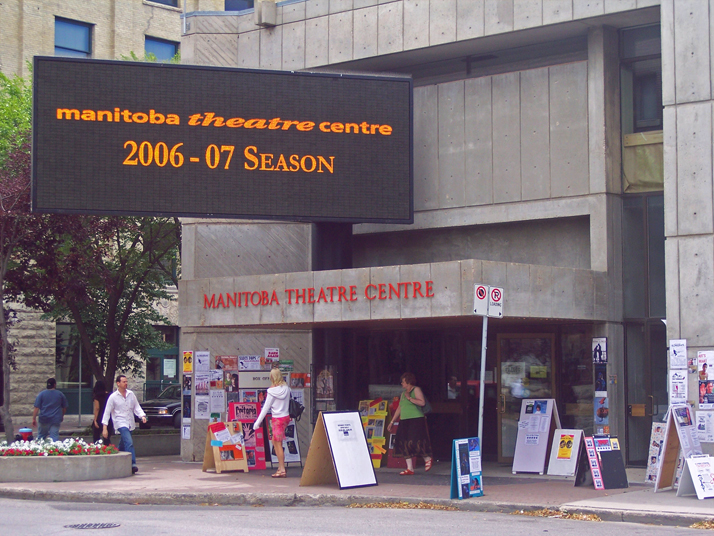
- MTC Mainstage

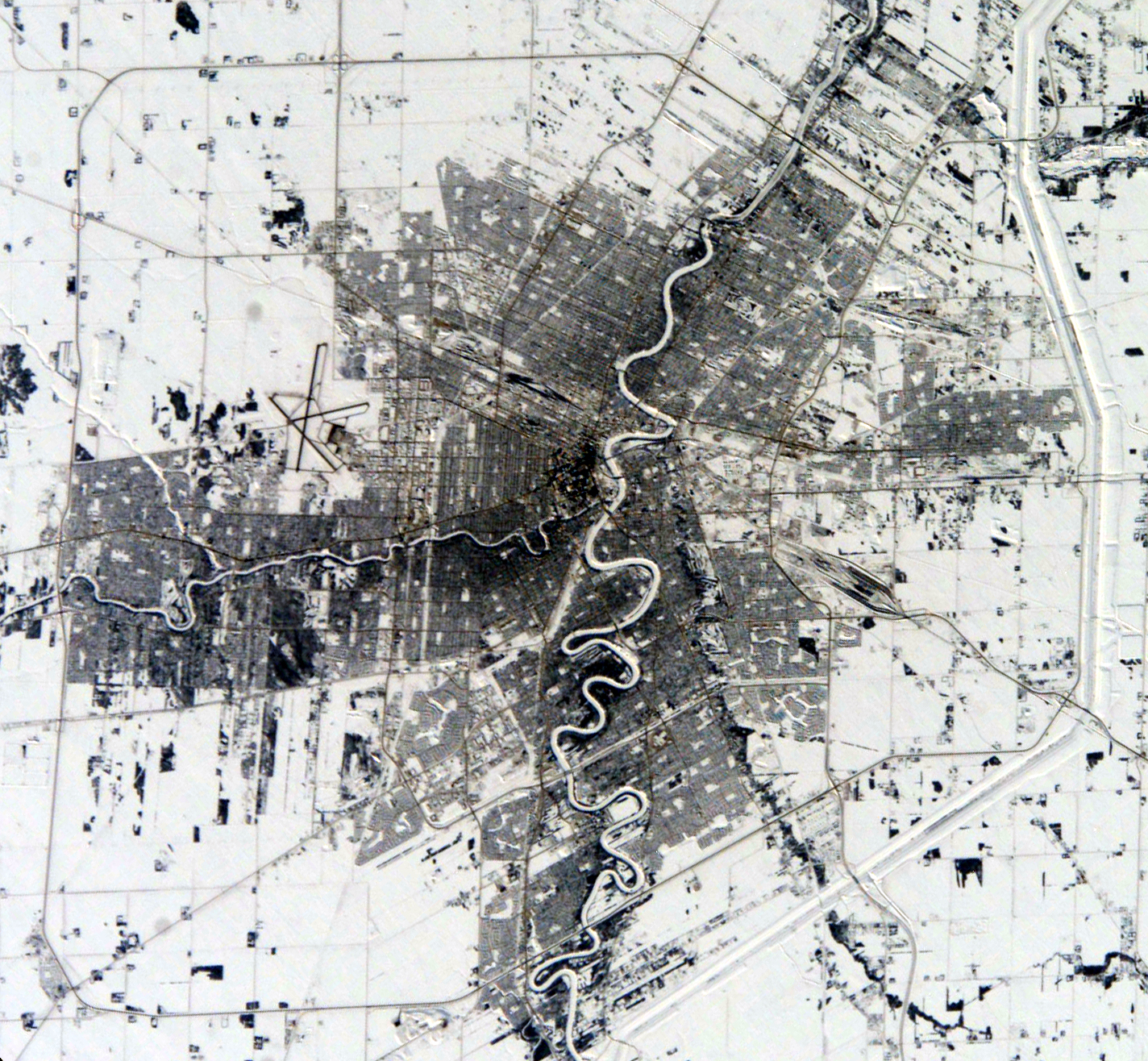
- Location within Winnipeg
- Former names: Winnipeg Little Theatre; Theatre 77
- Location: Winnipeg, Manitoba, Canada
- Coordinates: 49°53′55.5″N 97°08′11.1″W
- Elevation: 238 metres (781 ft)
- Operator: Manitoba Centennial Centre
- Capacity: 785 seats
- Type: Theatre
- Public transit: Concert Hall / City Hall

Construction
- Opened: October 31, 1970; 55 years ago
- Cost: CA$2.5 million
- Architect: Robert Kirby

Website
- royalmtc.ca

Royal Manitoba Theatre Centre (Royal MTC) is Canada's oldest English-language regional theatre. Next to the Stratford and Shaw Festivals, MTC has a higher annual attendance than any other theatre in the country. It was founded in 1958 by John Hirsch and Tom Hendry as an amalgamation of the Winnipeg Little Theatre and Theatre 77. In 2010, the theatre received a royal designation from Queen Elizabeth II, and officially became the Royal Manitoba Theatre Centre.

Its Mainstage on Market Avenue has a seating capacity of 785 and opened on October 31, 1970.

== History ==
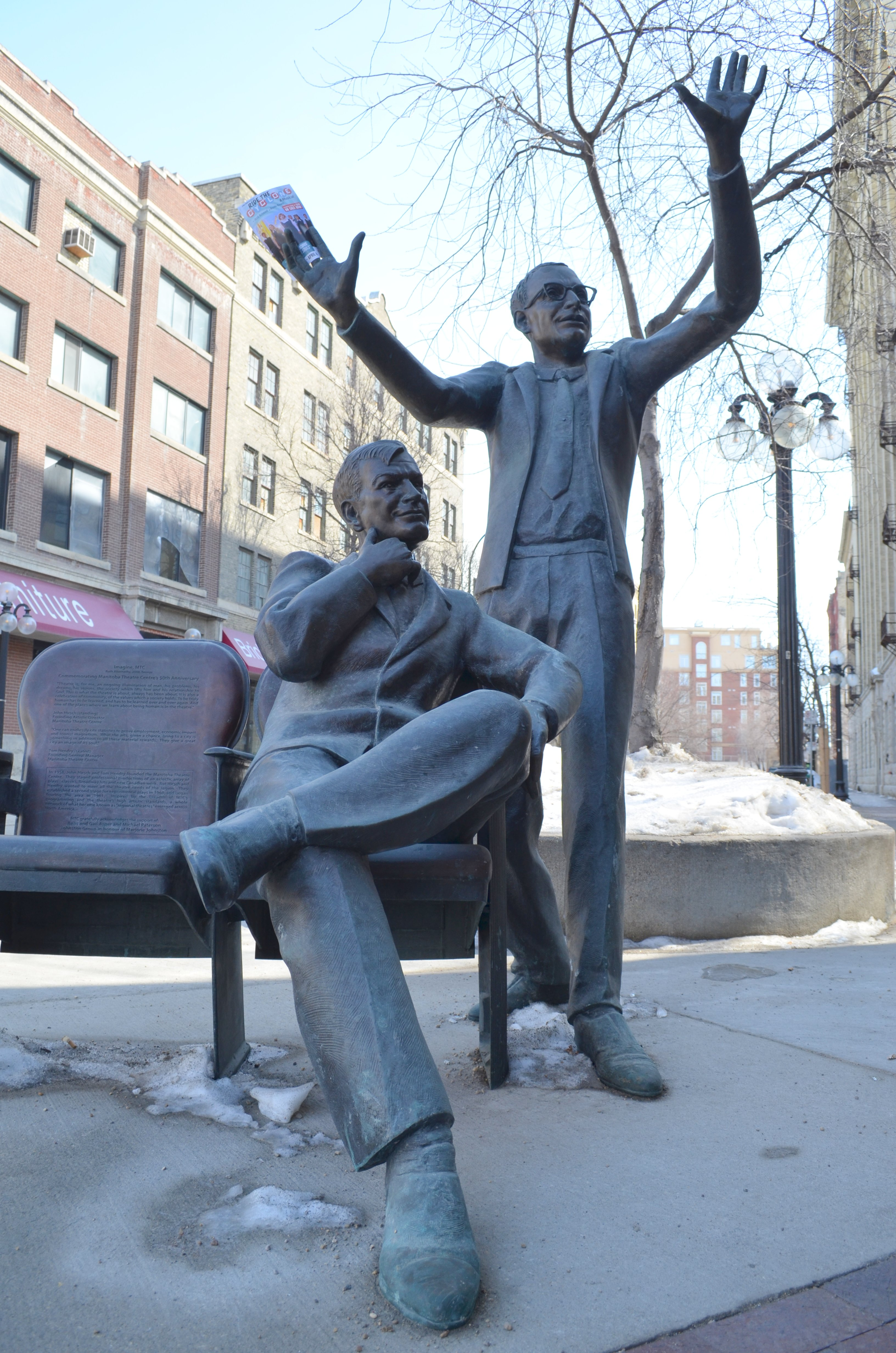
Bronze statue of Hendry and Hirsch

When the Winnipeg Little Theatre and Theatre 77 merged to become the Manitoba Theatre Centre in 1958, it became the first of a network of "regional theatres" across North America. Artistic Director John Hirsch and General Manager Tom Hendry focused on classics, Broadway hits, and new Canadian work. A second stage for experimental work was established in 1960, and an annual provincial tour began in 1961.

Since its founding, MTC has produced more than 600 plays with hundreds of actors, including Len Cariou, Graham Greene, Martha Henry, Judd Hirsch, Tom Hulce, William Hurt, Tom Jackson, Robert Lepage, Seana McKenna, Eric Peterson, Gordon Pinsent, Keanu Reeves, Fiona Reid, R.H. Thomson, Kathleen Turner and Al Waxman.

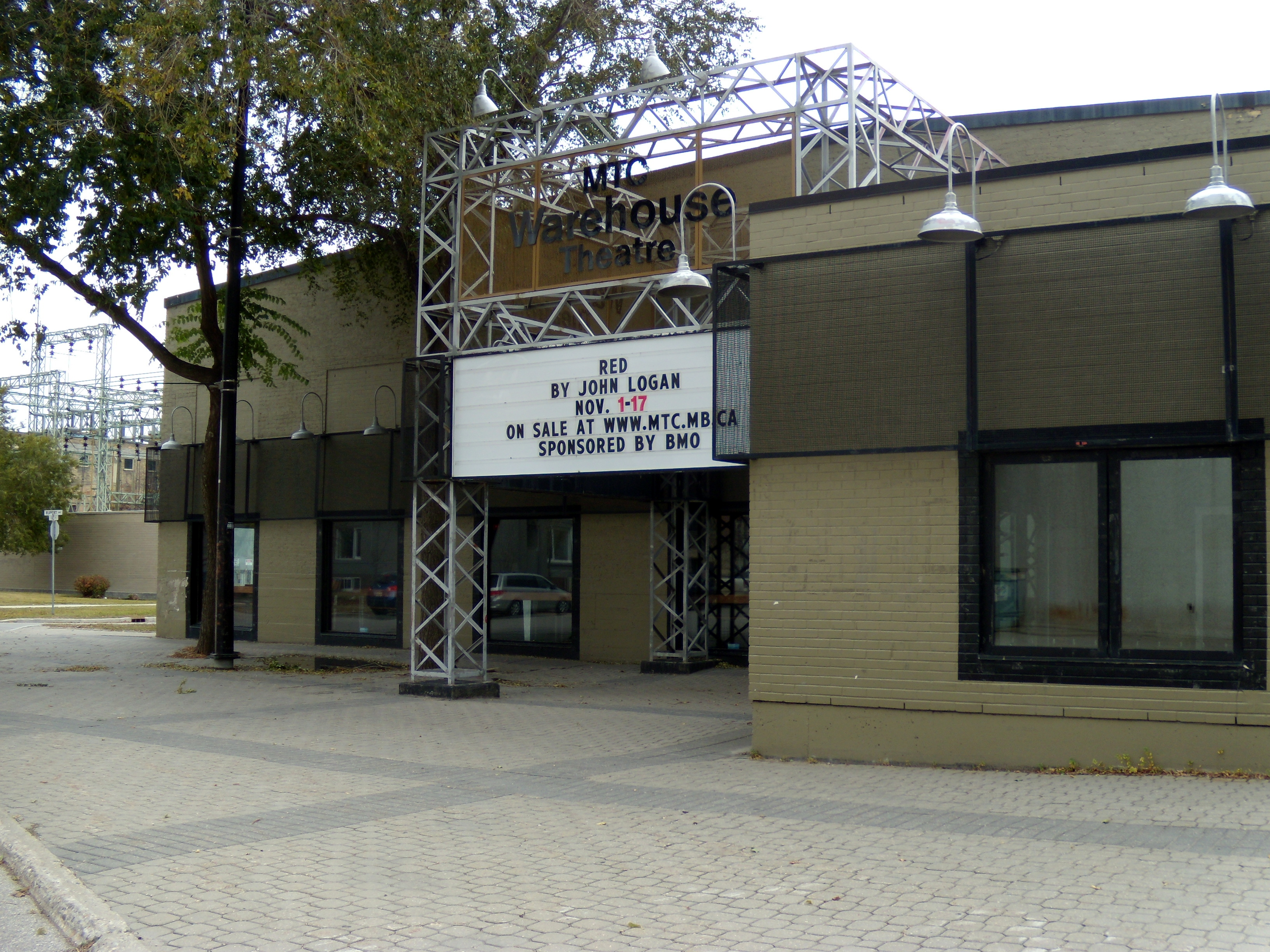
MTC Warehouse theatre

Today, the Royal Manitoba Theatre Centre operates two theatre venues in Winnipeg, Manitoba- The John Hirsch Mainstage and the Tom Hendry Warehouse. Each season, MTC produces six Mainstage productions, four Warehouse Productions, an annual 12-day Winnipeg Fringe Theatre Festival, the Master Playwright Festival and a regional tour. MTC also provides student-only matinees with the Theatre for Young Audiences program, and scholarships and apprentice opportunities for post-secondary theatre students. The Jean Murray - Moray Sinclair Theatre Scholarship is funded purely from donations received during a run of a particular show each season. The Naomi Levin Theatre Scholarship was established in memory of Naomi Levin, a theatre technician associated with the MTC for a number of years.

The theatres were renamed after the company's founders in 2008. In 2009, the Government of Canada designated the Mainstage theatre a National Historic Site. On October 26, 2010, Manitoba Theatre Centre received a Royal designation, becoming Royal Manitoba Theatre Centre.

== Architecture ==
The Royal Manitoba Theatre Centre was designed in the Brutalist style by Winnipeg's Number Ten Architectural Group with input from artistic director Eddie Gilbert. With its exposed concrete sculptural form, an informal interior theatre space and a foyer originally conceived to balance large gatherings and smaller intimate groups in the same space, the Royal Manitoba Theatre Centre is one of Canada's most important small-scale Brutalist designs.

== Artistic Directors ==
- John Hirsch (1958–1966)
- Edward Gilbert (1966–1969)
- Kurt Reis (1969–1970)
- Keith Turnbull (1970–1972)
- Edward Gilbert (1972–1975)
- Len Cariou (1975–1976)
- Arif Hasnain (1977–1980)
- Richard Ouzounian (1980–1984)
- James Roy (1984–1986)
- Rick McNair (1986–1989)
- Steven Schipper (1989–2019)
- Kelly Thornton (2019-)
