= Rick McNair =

Canadian basketball player and coach

Rick McNair (1942–2007), was a Canadian basketball player and coach. He was the former Director of Theatre Calgary and the Manitoba Theatre Centre and the founder of the Winnipeg Fringe Festival. Born in Amherst, Nova Scotia, he died in Winnipeg, Manitoba on January 31, 2007.

== Early years ==
McNair grew up in Sarnia, Ontario where he was very active in sports, in particular basketball and baseball. Upon graduation from college he began a teaching career that eventually led him into the theatre. While teaching at Galt Collegiate Institute & Vocational School (now located in Cambridge, Ontario) in the late 1960s and 1970s, he was responsible for establishing the Theatre Arts Program and Curriculum at GCI and a student performance group called the GCI Harlequin Players. Rick was a devoted teacher and had an affinity for recognizing and developing skills and talents in students that surpassed their own self cognizance. He was also one of those teachers who always had time for a chat, school related or not. He also had a close affiliation with The Galt Little Theatre.

== Career ==
Although successful as a teacher and basketball coach, he was smitten by the theatre and in 1977 headed west and joined Theatre Calgary as the director of Caravan, which was a touring theatre troupe that traveled to schools throughout Alberta. In 1979 Caravan was rebranded as Stage Coach Players and is known today as Quest Theatre. McNair's sojourn as artistic director at Theatre Calgary began in 1979 and was characterized by a particular emphasis on Canadian playwrights, commissioning works from writers such as Sharon Pollock, John Murrell and W.O. Mitchell among others.

From Theatre Calgary McNair moved to Winnipeg, where between 1986 and 1989 he was Director of the Manitoba Theatre Centre and where he continued to emphasize Canadian writers. McNair also founded the Winnipeg Fringe Festival in 1988 and was an active participant in many small venue productions as a writer, director and actor. His last production was as director of Tom Stoppard's "After Magritte".

McNair explored many different performance media. In 2001 he penned the libretto of Turtle Wakes, a one-act opera for young people, with music by Allan Gordon Bell. This work was originally commissioned by the Calgary Opera in 2001, and it was toured to Calgary and Southern Alberta schools again in 2005. Over the years he gave many performances as a Story Teller, traveling to schools throughout Manitoba as well as the Winnipeg Children's Festival, the Winnipeg Folk Festival and The Winnipeg Fringe Festival. His story telling experiences eventually led to the writing and publication of a children's book, The Last Unicorn of the Prairies, illustrated by Chris McVarish-Younger.

In addition to the many other backstage aspects of performing that McNair participated in, he was also a player and actor appearing in small parts in film and television. He appeared in many plays and his last role was as the Ghost of Christmas Present in the 2005 Manitoba Theatre Centre production of A Christmas Carol.

== Other contributions ==
McNair contributed to many aspects of the culture of Winnipeg, he and partner Richard Orlandini operated Borealis Books for many years, they were thoughtful bibliophiles who set the standard for a used book store in a city that is renowned for them. At the time of his death McNair was the President of the Manitoba Association of Playwrights.

== Works ==
Plays

Napi, The First Man
Beowulf!
Punch & Polly
Chagall
Dinosaurs
Dr. Barnardo's Pioneers (Theatre Calgary, 1978)
Hamlet - Who Cares? (Theatre Calgary 1979)
Ghost Town (Theatre Calgary, 1982)
To Far Away Places (Ship's Company Theatre 1989)
The Frank Slide - One Hundred Seconds
Global Village (2001)
Gulliver's Travels
A Life in the Movies (2001)
Merlin and Arthur
No More (2001)
Shoe Fly Blues (2002)
Sit Calm! (2001)
Merlin and Arthur (2004)

Libretto

Turtle Wakes (Calgary Opera 2001, 2005)

Children's Book

The Last Unicorn of the Prairies

See also: List of Canadian writers, List of Canadian playwrights
