= Robin Fulford =

Canadian writer

Robin Fulford is a Canadian writer. He is most noted for his 1988 theatrical play Steel Kiss, about the 1985 murder of Kenneth Zeller, and his 2008 play Whitewash, about the 1995 death of Dudley George during the Ipperwash Crisis.

A cofounder with Ken McDougall of Toronto's Platform 9 theatre company, Fulford is best known for plays that confront social issues. His other plays have included Dark Song (1988), Gargoyle (1990), Swahili Godot (1992), Sleeproom (1993), Mouth (1994), Eddycandyside (1996), Gulag (1996), Five Fingers (2001) and Tunnel (2005), as well as numerous collective credits with other playwrights and several short plays for youth.

Steel Kiss and its sequel Gulag received a dual staging by Buddies in Bad Times in 1999, as a response to the October 1998 murder of Matthew Shepard.
