= Makram Ayache =

Canadian playwright and actor

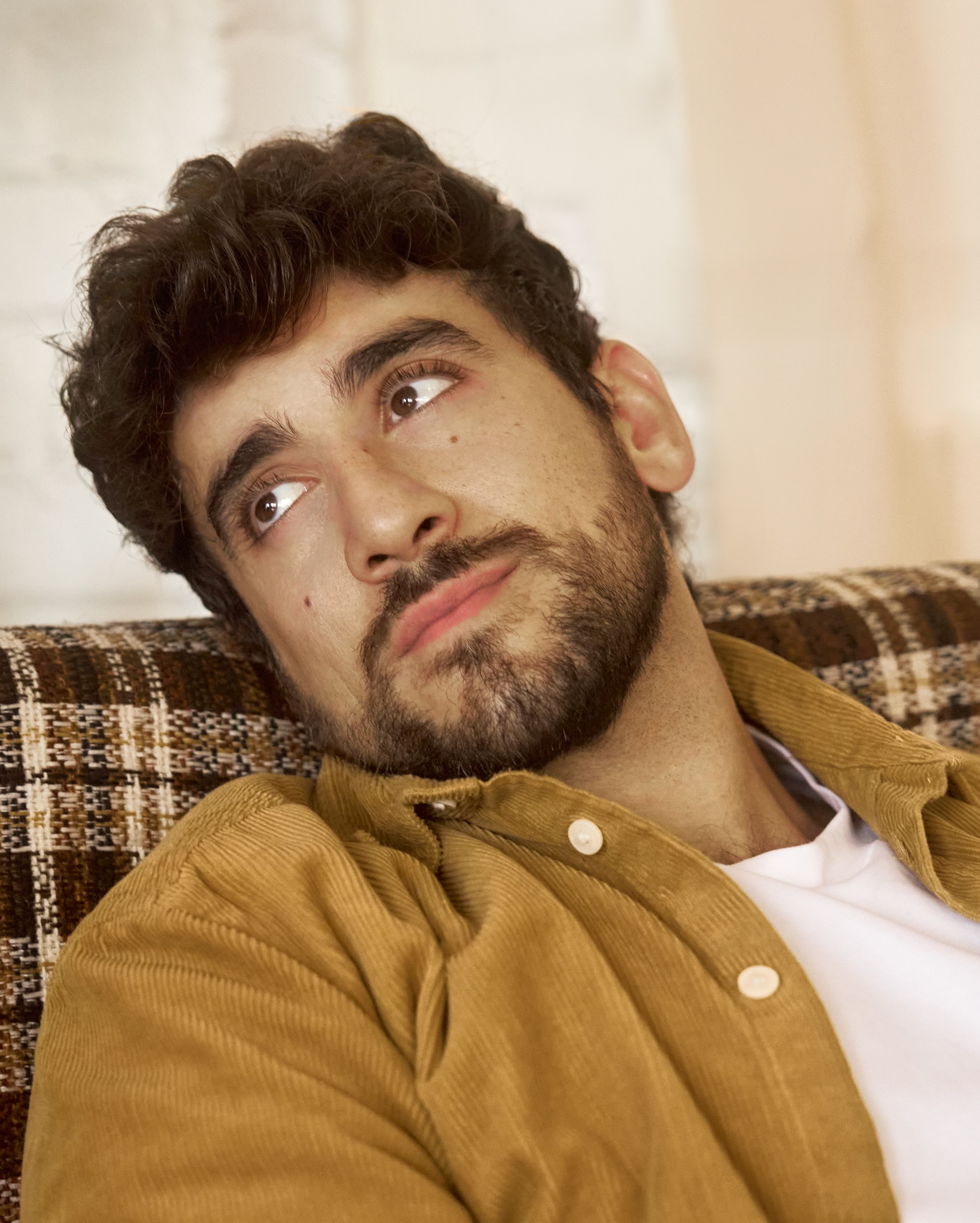
- Occupations: Playwright, theatre actor, director, producer
- Notable work: The Green Line; The Hooves Belonged to the Deer
- Awards: Dora Mavor Moore Outstanding New Play Independent Category (2025), Governor General Literary Award Finalist (2024); Betty Mitchell Award Recipient (2022); Elizabeth Sterling Haynes Outstanding Independent Production Award Recipient (2023); Playwrights' Guild of Canada's Tom Hendry Outstanding Emerging Artist Recipient (2020)
- Website: www.makramayache.com

Makram Ayache is a Canadian playwright and actor, whose play The Green Line was a shortlisted finalist for the Governor General's Award for English-language drama at the 2024 Governor General's Awards.

Born in Lebanon and raised in rural Alberta, he is a graduate of the University of Alberta, and currently divides his time between Edmonton and Toronto.

His first play, Harun, was staged at the Sage Theatre's Ignite! festival in Calgary in 2017. It was subsequently remounted at the Edmonton International Fringe Festival in 2018. It received an Elizabeth Sterling Haynes Award nomination for Outstanding Fringe New Work in 2019, and won the Playwrights Guild of Canada's RBC Emerging Playwright Award in 2020.

The Green Line premiered in 2022 at Calgary's Arts Commons, and was a Betty Award winner for Outstanding New Play that year.

In 2023, his play The Hooves Belonged to the Deer premiered in Toronto, as a collaboration between Tarragon Theatre and Buddies in Bad Times. It was subsequently remounted in Edmonton at the Edmonton Fringe Theatre Arts Barn. It received an Elizabeth Sterling Haynes Award for Outstanding Independent Production and Outstanding Director for Peter Hinton-Davis.

In 2025, Ayache's play The Tempest: A Witch in Algiers won the Dora Mavor Moore Award for Best Original Play (Independent Theatre).

Ayache is queer.
