= Seymour Blicker =

Canadian writer (born 1940)

Seymour Blicker (born 1940) is a Canadian playwright, screenwriter and novelist.

From 1978 to 1990, Blicker lectured on fiction writing at Concordia University.

He wrote the screenplay for The Kid (1997). Blicker also wrote episodes for Urban Angel and Barney Miller.

His is father to actor Jason Blicker. Both appeared in the 1995 film No Contest.

== Bibliography ==
Plays

- Up Your Alley (1987)
- Never Judge a Book by Its Cover (1987)
- Home Free
- Pipe Dreams
- Pals (2000)

Books

- Blues chased a rabbit (1969)
- Schmucks (1972)
- The last collection (1976)
