= Keith Barker (writer) =

Canadian playwright and theatre director

Keith Barker is a Canadian playwright and theatre director. The former artistic director of the Native Earth Performing Arts theatre company, he is most noted for his plays The Hours That Remain, an exploration of missing and murdered Indigenous women, and This Is How We Got Here, a play about youth suicide which was a shortlisted finalist for the Governor General's Award for English-language drama at the 2018 Governor General's Awards.

Keith is a citizen of the Métis Nation of Ontario, he grew up in Northwestern Ontario, Barker is a graduate of the theatre program at George Brown College.
