= Tom Hendry =

Co-founder of the Manitoba Theatre Centre

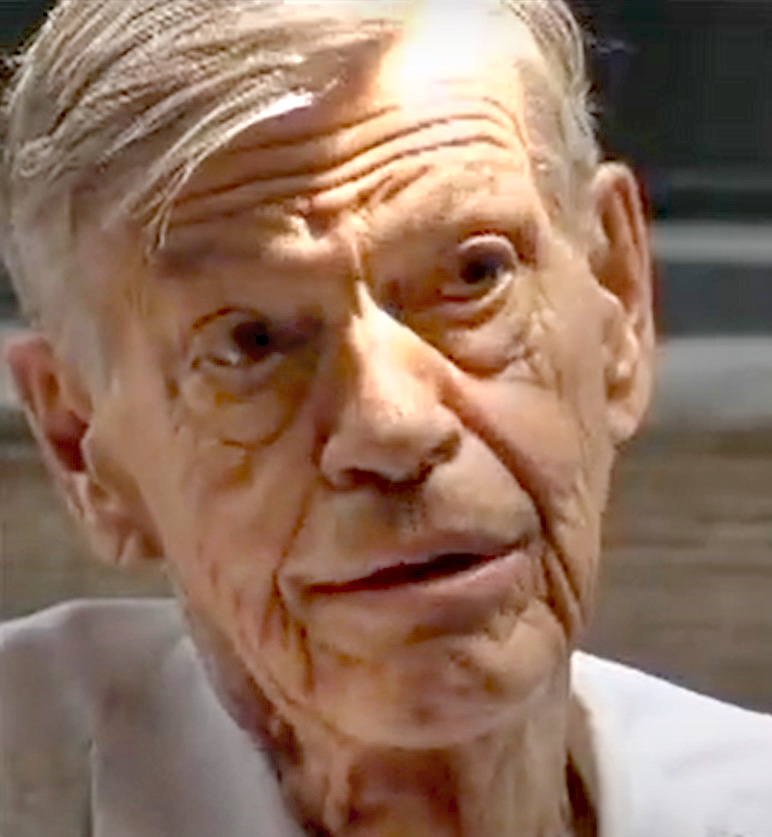
Tom Hendry in 2012

Tom Hendry (1929 – 2 December 2012) was the co-founder of the Manitoba Theatre Centre in 1958 and, in 2008, the MTC Warehouse Theatre was officially dedicated to Hendry.

Hendry was born in Manitoba. He attended the University of Manitoba in 1947 but was later expelled. Hendry served as head manager for MTC until 1963. He became a manager at Stratford Festival, co-founder of PGOC and Toronto Free Theatre in 1972 and founded the Banff Playwrights Colony in 1974.

Hendry was also a playwright and television writer, including for the CBC Television series King of Kensington. His plays included How Are Things With the Walking Wounded? (1970), The Missionary Position (1971), Fifteen Miles of Broken Glass, Gravediggers of 1942 and Satyricon.

He was named an Officer of the Order of Canada in 1995.
