= MUN Extension Service =

Canandian education outreach program (1959–1991)

MUN Extension Service, also known as "MUN Extension" or simply "Extension," was an innovative outreach program run by Memorial University of Newfoundland between 1959 and 1991. It was notable for its use of interactive media and field workers to promote community development in rural areas of the province.

== History ==
MUN Extension Service had its roots in the 1930s when MUN's (then Memorial University College's) first president, John Lewis Paton, encouraged the formation of the Newfoundland Adult Education Association (NAEA). The NAEA employed field workers in rural communities as early as the 1930s to improve economic outcomes through adult education. At the same time the co-operative model was being actively promoted as an alternative to merchant capital. The Newfoundland Commission of Government would eventually establish a Co-operative Division to encourage the formulation of co-operative societies in the province.

At the prompting of then-premier Joey Smallwood MUN Extension Service was established in 1959 with S. John Colman as director and Edna Baird as staffperson. While influenced by the land grant colleges of the United States and the educational outreach of Oxford University, Colman recognized the need to tailor MUN's program to local circumstances. One adaptation was the placement of development specialists in rural areas of Newfoundland and Labrador in order to build relationships with local residents. The Extension Service notably endeavored to empower communities to organize solutions rather than to impose university-conceived solutions on communities. Such solutions included multimedia projects, co-operative societies, and courses.

Under Donald Snowden, appointed director in 1964, the Extension Service adopted an "unstructured approach [that] encouraged experimentation." Access to federal funding enabled Snowden to recruit a "creative and dedicated group" who became both activists and community organizers in the field. Projects and films were regularly reviewed as a group for critical appraisal. At this time Extension Service included a dedicated television, magazine, and film unit.

The Extension Service's activity and influence peaked by 1969. By the 1980s changes in educational priorities, improvements in communication, the success of grassroots community organizations, and the development of a professional and skilled civil service had both eroded support and reduced the need for the Extension Service model. MUN closed the Extension Service in 1991 as it pivoted to a more traditional model of distance education.

== Fogo Process ==
The Fogo Process describes both an Extension project and an approach to film-making, derived in part from the Challenge for Change program of the National Film Board, in which the act of producing the film became a means of developing the message and encouraging dialogue. Films were produced and screened with a community sparking debate which was itself filmed and disseminated. Results could then be brought directly to government officials and other communities.

== Decks Awash ==
Decks Awash was a magazine of the Extension Service published between 1968 and 1993 which developed from a television program of the same name. Content was developed both by employees and freelance contributors around the province.
