= Colleen Wagner =

Canadian playwright

- Born: Elk Point, Alberta
- Occupation: playwright
- Writing career
- Period: 1980s – present
- Notable work: The Monument

Colleen Wagner (born in Elk Point, Alberta) is a Canadian playwright. She is best known for her 1995 play The Monument, which won the Governor General's Award for English-language drama at the 1996 Governor General's Awards. Her other plays have included Sand (1989), Eclipsed (1991), The Morning Bird (2005), Down from Heaven (2009) Home (2010), The Living (2019) and 'Armadillos' (2023).

She has written and directed a feature documentary film, Women Building Peace based on her travels in Africa, an interactive website, and a short film, Remembrance Day. Short fiction and poetry have been published in various anthologies.

Wagner was educated at the Ontario College of Art and Design and the University of Toronto. She is an associate professor of screenwriting in the film studies department at York University.
