= Theatre Passe Muraille =

Canadian theatre company

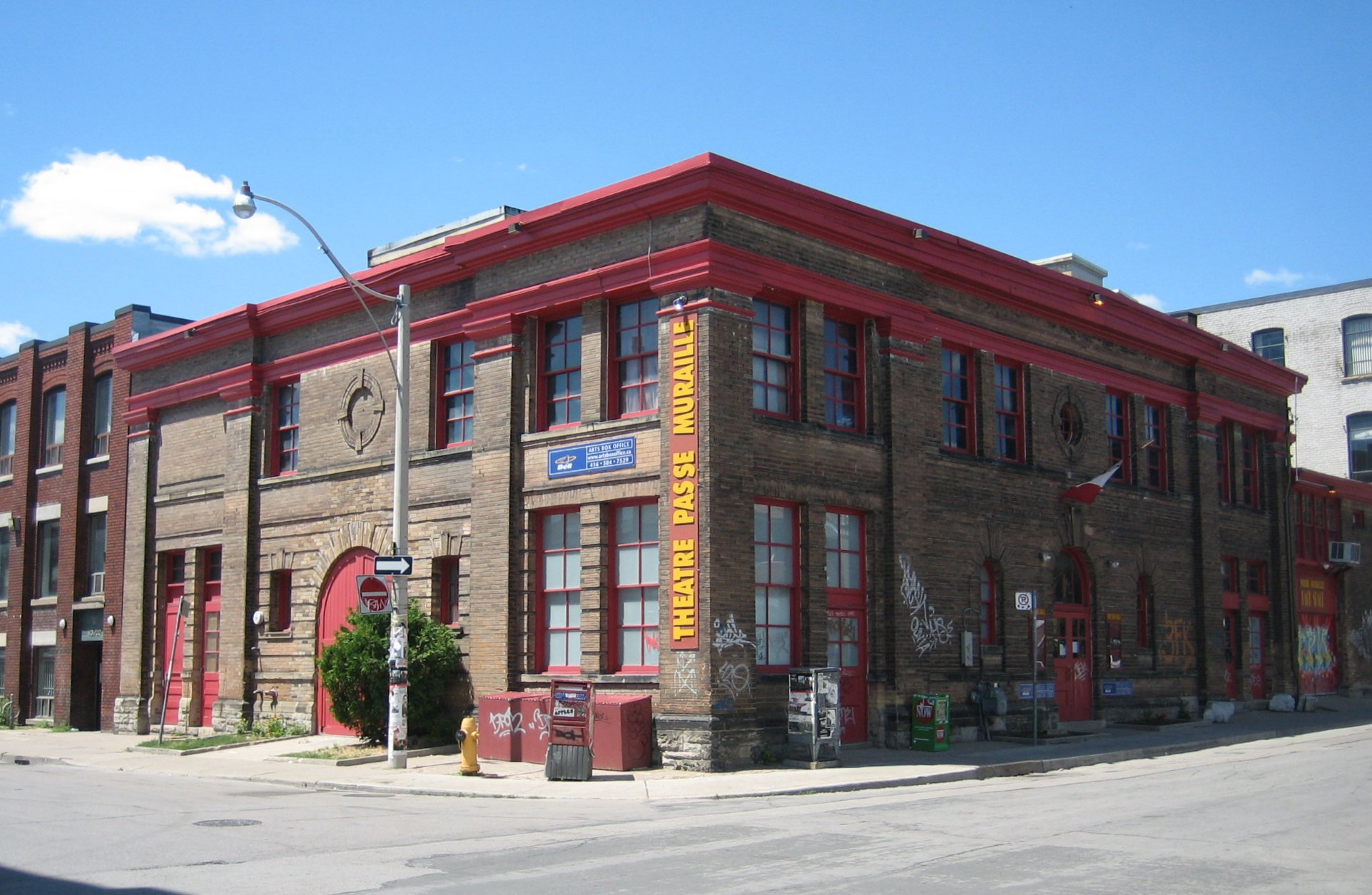
The home of the theatre on Ryerson Street

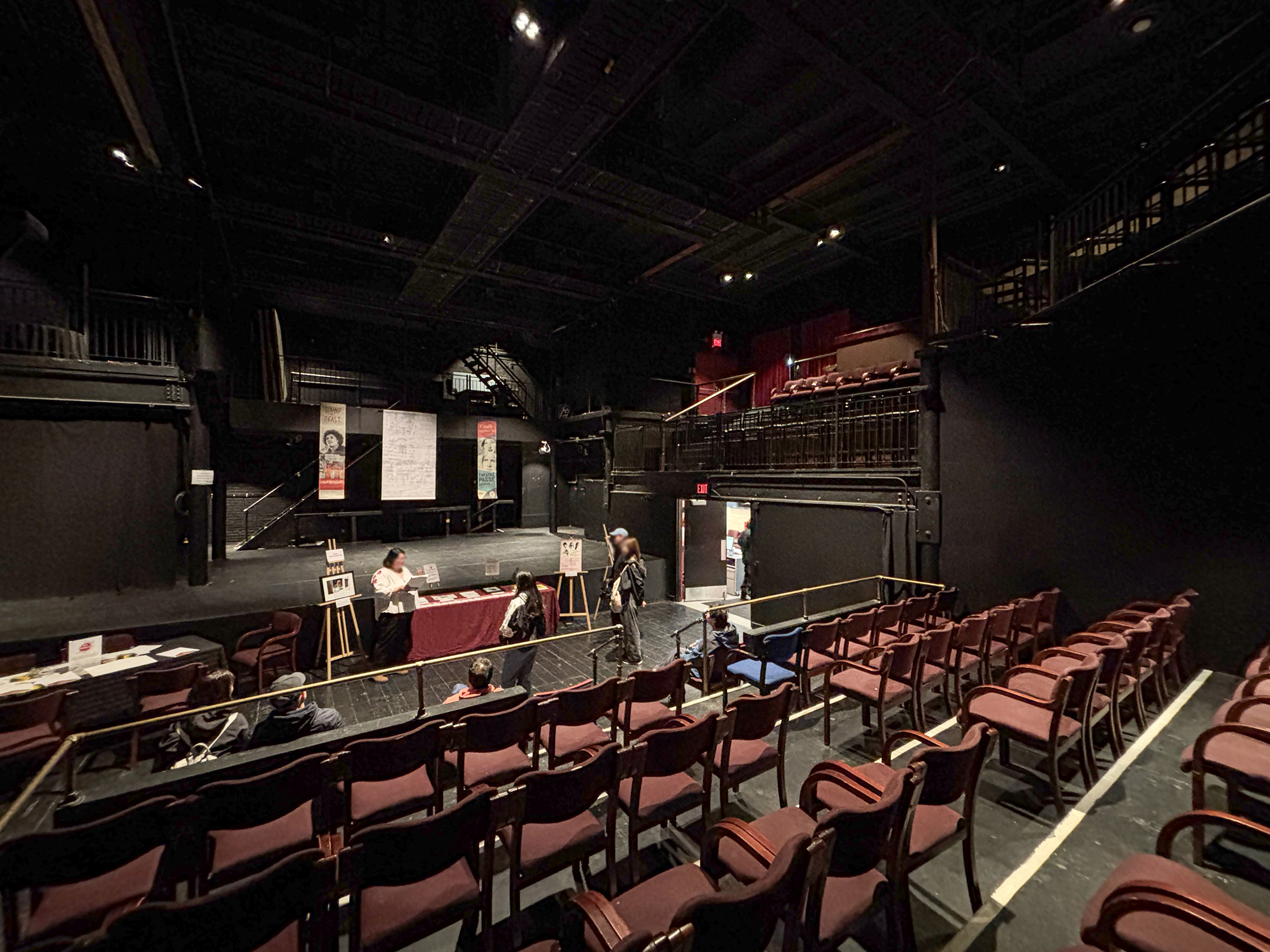
Theatre interior

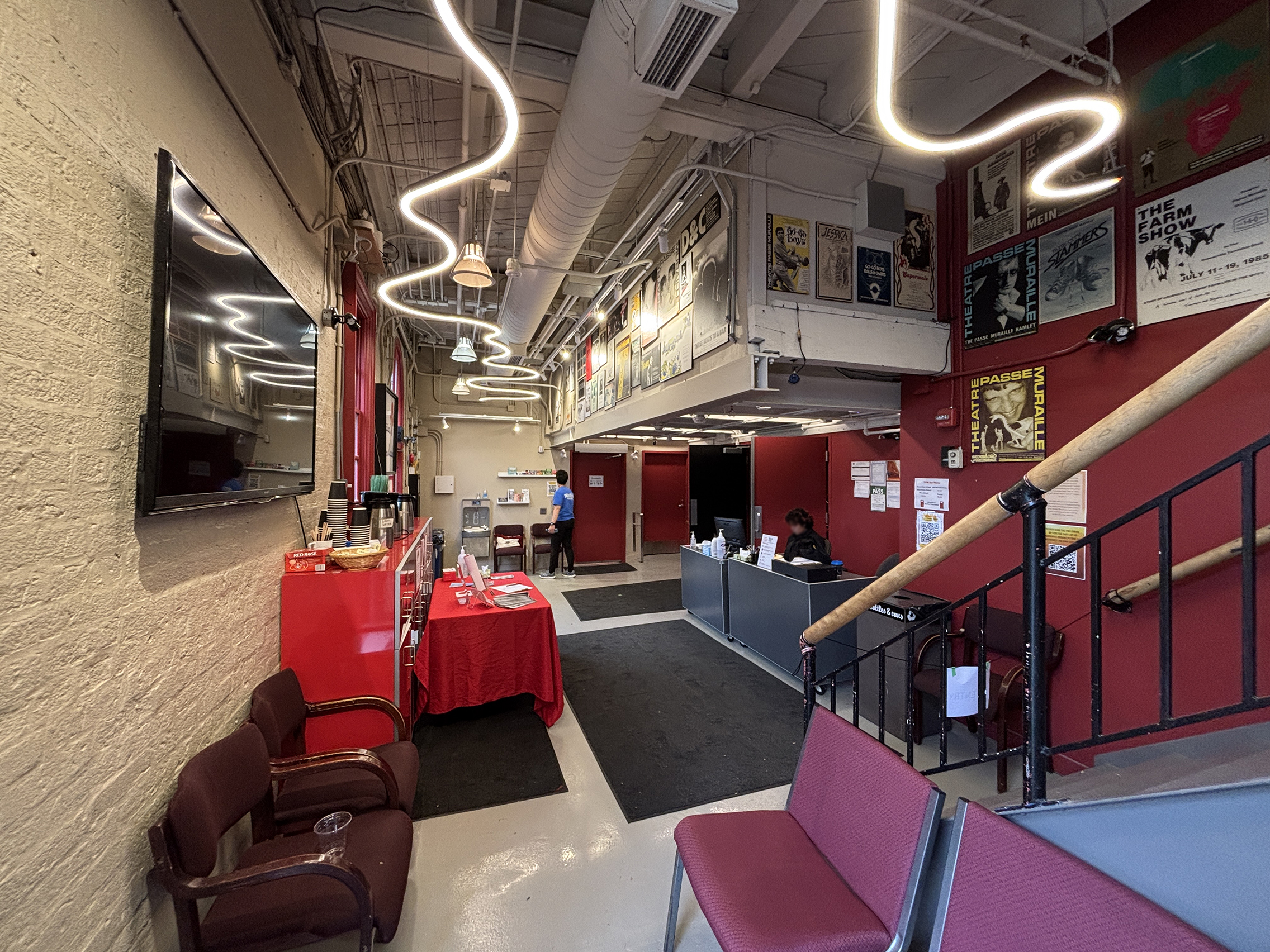
Theatre lobby

Theatre Passe Muraille is a theatre company in Toronto, Ontario, Canada. It is on Ryerson Avenue in the Alexandra Park neighbourhood of Toronto.

== Brief history ==
One of Canada's most influential alternative theatres, Theatre Passe Muraille ("theatre beyond walls") was founded in 1968 by director and playwright Jim Garrard, who started the company out of Rochdale College.

Its intention was to create a distinctly Canadian voice in theatre. It was conceived with the notion that theatre should transcend real estate and that plays can be made and staged anywhere — in barns, in auction rings, in churches, bars, basements, lofts, even in streetcars. The company was interested in the idea that theatre should endeavour to be a mirror, not a vehicle of social change.

The company gained local notoriety when it was charged with obscenity for the play Futz by American playwright Rochelle Owens, about a farmer who falls in love with his pig.

Jim Garrard was succeeded by Martin Kinch, who held the job of artistic director for a year (with Paul Thompson as technical director) before he went on to found Toronto Free Theatre with John Palmer and Tom Hendry.

It was under Thompson's directorship in the 1970s that the theatre gained its national reputation. Thompson guided the company towards a distinctive style of collective creation with plays such as The Farm Show, 1837: The Farmer's Revolt and I Love You, Baby Blue.

Theatre Passe Muraille's 1975 production of I Love You, Baby Blue was seen by over 26,000 people before it was closed by the police. Charges brought against the theatre for "immorality" were thrown out of court for lack of evidence. However, the success of the production was profitable enough for the company to put a down payment on a permanent theatre space. The company remains one of only a handful of non-for-profit theatres in Toronto that owns the spaces in which it performs.

Other notable productions produced at Passe Muraille include O.D. on Paradise and Maggie and Pierre by Linda Griffiths; Fire by David Young and Paul Ledoux; The Stone Angel, James Nichol's adaptation of the novel by Margaret Laurence; Judith Thompson's The Crackwalker; and Lilies by Quebec playwright Michel Marc Bouchard. The company also had success in 2001 with Michael Healey's play The Drawer Boy, which was based on actor Miles Potter's experiences researching and developing The Farm Show.

== Collective creation ==
Paul Thompson brought to the company the art of “collective creation,” a technique in which plays are made collectively by the actors themselves. The use of collective creation at Passe Muraille began when Paul Thompson, John Palmer and Martin Kinch found themselves with many ideas for shows but no scripts.

Thompson stated that “the collective-creation idea was inspired obviously by the Living Theatre, but more closely by a company called Theatre d’Aujourd’hui … There were a group of actors who had come out of the French section of the National Theatre School and were doing some very good improvisationally written shows and that sort of got me excited.” He has stated that he was also inspired by Chinese theatre he had read about.

The Farm Show is arguably the most significant collective creation in TPM’s history. In 1972, Thompson and a group of actors went out into farming country around Clinton in southwestern Ontario. They lived with the farmers, worked with them, watched them and learned their stories. Then Thompson, who had been raised in farm country, required his actors to create a play, each being responsible for his or her own part. It was part of an idea that became a theme in later work: to help Canadians find new heroes and to move away from the Davy Crockett types. The impact of The Farm Show was guaranteed by the fact that the community the show was built around saw it first and received it positively. The show premiered in the same barn the actors used for rehearsals. It was a terrific success and went on to tour.

== Developing Canadian theatre ==
Since its inception, Passe Muraille has mentored and provided space and support to emerging theatre artists companies. In 1973, Thompson started a production-oriented "seed-show" programme. During his term, Clarke Rogers started a script-oriented New Works programme and most recently, current Artistic Director Andy McKim opened the theatre's doors to anyone with new ideas for Passe Muraille's new Five-minute Pitch programme.

Many successful alternative theatre companies developed within Passe Muraille's walls. Buddies in Bad Times, which is committed to supporting LBGT voices, the feminist Nightwood Theatre, Newfoundland's CODCO, Necessary Angel Company and the Blyth Summer Festival, among others, all had their beginnings with TPM.

Many well-known performers, writers and theatre artists, including Eric Peterson, David Fox, Mary Walsh, Rick Salutin and Linda Griffiths worked with Passe Muraille early in their careers. Writers Ann-Marie MacDonald, Michael Ondaatje, Maria Campbell and Timothy Findley have all staged plays at Passe Muraille.

== Venue ==
The building was originally a bakery built in 1902 and has served several purposes over the decades. When TPM took the building over it had fallen under disrepair and large renovations were undertaken to bring the building up to the required standards.

A second round of renovations began in 1983, the most important additions of which were the building of a large cruciform opening in the floor of the second storey and the installation of a lighting grid. The theatre houses two stages: the "Mainspace" which seats 185 and the "Backspace" which seats 55.

The space was designated a historic building in 1977 by the Toronto Historical Board under Part IV of the Ontario Heritage Act, noting that, "the skillful use of brick and classical architectural design elements in the facade gives prominence in the neighbourhood"

== Artistic directors ==
- Jim Garrard (1968–1969)
- Martin Kinch, John Palmer, Paul Thompson (1969–1972)
- Paul Thompson (1972–1981)
- Clarke Rogers (1982–1987)
- Brian Richmond (1988–1990)
- Layne Coleman (1991)
- Susan Serran (1992–1996)
- Layne Coleman (1997–2007)
- Andy McKim (2007–2019)
- Marjorie Chan (2019–present)

== Chalmers Canadian Play Awards ==
2000 The Drawer Boy by Michael Healey and Alien Creature: A Visitation from Gwendolyn MacEwen by Linda Griffiths

1997 Stuck by David Rubinoff

1995 The Alistair Trilogy by Nadia Ross and Diane Cave

1993 A Play About the Mothers of the Plaza de Mayo by Alisa Palmer and Hillar Liitoja and The Stillborn Lover by Timothy Findley

1990 Dry Lips Oughta Move to Kapuskasing by Tomson Highway

1989 Fire by Paul Ledoux, David Young and Otis Black Well

1986 Jessica by Linda Griffiths with Maria Campbell
