= Hillar Liitoja =

Canadian playwright and theatre director (1954–2023)

- Born: Erik Hillar Liitoja; June 18, 1954
- Died: June 2, 2023 (aged 68)
- Occupations: Playwright, theatre director
- Writing career
- Notable work: The Last Supper
- Notable awards: Floyd S. Chalmers Canadian Play Award (1994)

Erik Hillar Liitoja (June 18, 1954 – June 2, 2023) was a Canadian playwright and theatre director. He was most noted for his 1993 play The Last Supper, which won the Floyd S. Chalmers Canadian Play Award in 1994 and was adapted by Cynthia Roberts into the 1994 feature film The Last Supper.

Trained as a concert pianist, Liitoja founded his own Toronto, Ontario theatre company, DNA Theatre, in the 1980s. His other plays have included This Is What Happens in Orangeville, The Panel, The Deputation, Sick, Poundemonium, Artaud and His Doubles, Phalanx, Paula and Karl, Wit in Love and I Know and Feel That Fate Is Harsh But I Am So Loathe to Accept This.

Liitoja won several Dora Mavor Moore Awards for Best Direction of a Play in the Small Theatre division, winning in 1989 for a production of Hamlet, in 1991 for Sick, and in 1994 for The Last Supper.

Liitoja died on June 2, 2023, at the age of 68.
