= Playwrights Guild of Canada =

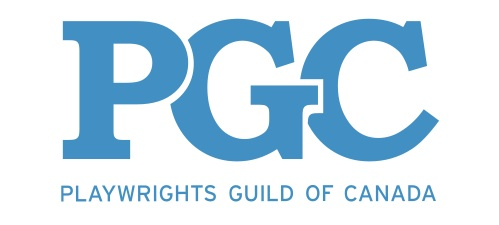
- Formation: 1972
- Type: Charity
- Headquarters: Toronto
- Website: https://playwrightsguild.ca

Playwrights Guild of Canada (PGC) is a Canadian charity that works to advance the creative rights and interests of professional Canadian playwrights; promote Canadian plays, and foster community of writers. It was founded in 1972.

== History ==
PGC has its origins in a meeting held in 1971 by a Canada Council theatre officer, David Gardner, with Carol Bolt, Tom Hendry, and Len Peterson to discuss issues affecting English Canadian playwrights. Those present at the meeting determined that there was a need for a publishing house for Canadian plays. Following the meeting, Bolt, Hendry, and Peterson established the Toronto Playwrights Circle to obtain funding for the project. The next year, the group founded the Playwrights Co-operative, which published and distributed Canadian plays, arranged live readings by playwrights, and administered amateur rights. The Co-op became a non-profit in 1979, renamed Playwrights Canada Inc., and in 1982, it merged with the Guild of Canadian Playwrights (established in 1977 to lobby for suitable working conditions) to become the Playwrights Union of Canada (PUC). In 1986, PUC created the Canadian Drama Foundation (formerly known as the Foundation for Recognition of Excellence in Drama) as its charitable arm.

Restructuring occurred once again in 2002, when the Playwrights Union of Canada divided into two new organizations:Playwrights Canada Press, a for-profit publishing imprint; and the Playwrights Guild of Canada (PGC), an arts service association advocating for playwrights in Canada.

== Organization ==
PGC is a registered charitable organization. Part of its funding comes from the Canada Council, the Ontario Arts Council, and the City of Toronto through the Toronto Arts Council.

PGC has a Women's Caucus, which supports intersectional feminism and performs interventions to help offset existing industry barriers.

PGC celebrated its 40th anniversary in 2012 with a series of special events, such as a week-long play reading series in May that included Maja Ardal, Drew Hayden Taylor, Hannah Moscovitch, Brad Fraser, and Marcia Johnson.

In May 2017, PGC opened the Canadian Play Outlet (CPO), originally located at 401 Richmond Street West, but now operating as an online bookstore with a selection of over 2000 published and unpublished plays by Canadian playwrights.

== Programs and services ==
The Playwrights Guild of Canada provides dozens of programs and services for emerging and professional Canadian playwrights. PGC focuses primarily on promotion, protection, and pluralism, offering the following services to its members:

- Publication of CanScene, PGC's monthly newsletter, which includes calls for submissions, contests, and other opportunities;
- Promotion of playwrights via print publications, the PGC website, social media networks, awards program, and other means;
- Advertising, selling, and distributing the published and unpublished plays of its members;
- Negotiating with the Professional Association of Canadian Theatres to create standardized rates and production contracts;
- Administering amateur production rights, and providing professional contract advice;
- Facilitating the Canada Council Readings Program, now called PlayConnect, which creates opportunities for organizations such as universities, libraries and community groups to invite Canadian playwrights to read in public venues by paying the playwright's reading fees and subsidizing their travel expenses;
- Providing professional development workshops, webinars, conferences, and other events;
- Overseeing member enrollment in the AFBS RRSP Investment Plan and the Writer's Coalition Insurance Program.

PGC also publishes a Community Newsletter, which includes a monthly listing of the most recent electronic copyscript plays added to the online bookstore, the Canadian Play Outlet (CPO). The CPO carries thousands of Canadian plays, and includes special curated collections pertaining to genre, geographical region, cast-size, and more. This helps narrow the gap between a written work and a production, and allows members to send PGC plays that have not yet been produced, but are ready to be promoted for the stage.

PGC's Women's Caucus undertakes a number of equity-related initiatives to help rectify the industry's gender imbalances, such as the now defunct multi-stakeholder Equity in Theatre project (2014 - 2017); the annual Bra d'Or Award, which celebrates people who support the work of women playwrights; Gender-Based Production Authorship Surveys, conducted annually to measure gains in representation; the Pledge Project, an educators' database with large-cast plays by Canadian women; SureFire, a community-generated resource of production-ready under- or un-produced plays by Canadian women, trans, and/or non-binary creators; and the CASA Award, which supports an established South African playwright of an historically marginalized gender.

== Awards ==
PGC has an annual awards competition with several categories: Lifetime Membership, Honorary Membership, a Post-Secondary Competition, the Bra d'Or Award, the Carol Bolt Award, RBC Emerging Playwright Award, the Stage West Pechet Family Comedy Award, and the Stage West Pechet Family Musical Award. The awards were named the Tom Hendrys after Tom Hendry, a founding member of PGC who died in 2012. The awards carry generous cash prizes, and winners are recognized in a ceremony occurring in the fall each year. Submissions open in January and are accepted through to May.

In 2018, a new award category was added for three years: The Sharon Enkin Plays for Young People.

The sponsorship of PGC's Awards shifted somewhat in 2020 due to the impact of COVID-19. The Pechet family withdrew its support, affecting two award categories, which were replaced by new award sponsorships: [Queen's University's] Dan School of Drama and Music Musical Award, and the Chris Tolley & Dharini Woollcombe Comedy Award. The Carol Bolt Award, also named after a PGC fore founder, Carol Bolt, was removed entirely, due to a live production component, and it was replaced by the Playwrights Guild Drama Award.
