= List of writers from New Brunswick =

The Canadian province of New Brunswick has produced writers across a wide variety of genres. This list includes notable writers who were born in New Brunswick or spent a significant portion of their writing career living in New Brunswick.

== A ==
- Peter John Allan (1825–1848), poet
- Rebecca Agatha Armour (1845–1891), novelist
- Tammy Armstrong (born 1974), poet, novelist

== B ==
- Alfred Bailey (1905–1997), poet, anthropologist, ethno-historian
- Brian Bartlett (born 1953), poet, essayist, nature writer
- Bill Bauer (1932–2010), poet, short story writer
- Nancy Bauer (born 1934), novelist, short story writer, non-fiction writer
- Shirley Bear (1936–2022), poet
- Emily Elizabeth Shaw Beavan (c. 1818–1897), poet, story writer
- Julia Catherine Beckwith (1796–1867), novelist
- John Edward Belliveau (1913–1998), journalist, non-fiction writer
- Renée Belliveau (living), memoirist, novelist
- Craven Langstroth Betts (1853–1941), poet
- Renée Blanchar (born 1964), screenwriter
- Henry Bliss (1797–1873)
- Clay Borris (born 1950), screenwriter
- David Boyd (1951–2025), novelist, playwright
- Elizabeth Brewster (1922–2012), poet
- Thomas Storrow Brown (1803–1888), journalist, non-fiction writer

== C ==
- Laura Calder (living), cookbook writer
- Silver Donald Cameron (1937–2020), journalist, playwright, non-fiction writer
- Bliss Carman (1861–1929), poet
- Dyson Carter (1910–1996), journalist, novelist, non-fiction writer
- Shirley Jackson Case (1872–1947), historian
- Herménégilde Chiasson (born 1946), poet, playwright
- Peter D. Clark (living), folklorist
- George Frederick Clarke (1883–1974), historian
- Jon Claytor (living), graphic novelist
- Wayne Clifford (1944–2025), poet
- Michael Clowater (living), screenwriter
- Fred Cogswell (1917–2004), poet
- Anne Compton (born 1947), poet
- Ann Copeland (born 1932), short story writer
- Michel Cormier (born 1957), journalist
- Gracia Couturier (born 1951), novelist, playwright, children's writer
- Louis Cunningham (1900–1954), novelist, short story writer
- Herb Curtis (born 1949), novelist, humorist
- Myriam Cyr (living), playwright, non-fiction writer

== D ==
- France Daigle (born 1953), novelist, playwright
- Lynn Davies (born 1954), poet
- M. T. Dohaney (born 1930), novelist, short story writer, non-fiction writer
- Lyse Doucet (born 1958), journalist

== E ==
- Lawrence Earl (1915–2005), journalist, novelist, non-fiction writer
- Lorraine Eden (living), non-fiction writer
- Jerrod Edson (born 1974), novelist

== F ==
- Jesse Patrick Ferguson (living), poet
- Peter Fisher (1782–1848), historian
- Sheree Fitch (born 1956), children's writer, poet
- May Agnes Fleming (1840–1880), novelist
- Léonard Forest (1928–2024), poet, essayist
- Raymond Fraser (1941–2018), essayist, memoirist, novelist, poet, short story writer
- Northrop Frye (1912–1991), literary critic

== G ==
- Melvin Gallant (1932–2023), novelist, poet
- William Francis Ganong (1864–1941), botanist, historian, cartographer
- Placide Gaudet (1850–1930), historian, journalist
- Marshall Gauvin (1881–1978)
- Angus Morrison Gidney (1803–1882), poet, journalist
- Lex Gigeroff (1962–2011), screenwriter
- Oliver Goldsmith (1794–1861), poet
- Mary Grannan (1900–1975), children's writer
- R. W. Gray (living), novelist, poet, short story writer, screenwriter

== H ==
- Emma Haché (born 1979), playwright
- Edward Hagerman (1939–2016), non-fiction writer
- Gerald Hannon (1944–2022), journalist
- Hélène Harbec (born 1946), poet
- Elisabeth Harvor (1936–2024), short story writer, poet, novelist
- Kate Simpson Hayes (1856–1945), playwright, author, journalist, poet
- William C. Heine (1919–1991), journalist, novelist, non-fiction writer
- Anna Minerva Henderson (1887–1987), poet
- Vera Brown Holmes (1890–1980), historian
- David Huebert (living), poet, novelist, short story writer

== I ==
- Lincoln Keith Ingersoll (1914–1993), historian

== J ==
- Isaac Allen Jack (1843–1903)
- Melynda Jarratt (living), historian
- Rodrigue Jean (living), screenwriter
- K. V. Johansen (born 1968), novelist, children's writer

== K ==
- Ethel Knight Kelly (1875–1949), playwright, novelist

== L ==
- Israël Landry (1843–1910)
- Valentin Landry (1844–1919), journalist
- M. Travis Lane (born 1934), poet
- Gérald Leblanc (1945–2005), poet
- Raymond Guy LeBlanc (1945–2021), poet
- Antoine Joseph Léger (1880–1950), novelist, non-fiction writer
- William Martin Leggett (1805–1878), poet, journalist
- Douglas Lochhead (1922–2011), poet, bibliographer

== M ==
- Elizabeth Roberts MacDonald (1864–1922), poet, essayist, children's writer, short story writer
- Antonine Maillet (1929–2025), novelist, playwright
- Laurence Manning (1899–1972), science fiction writer
- Louise Manny (1890–1970), folklorist, historian
- Hubert Marcoux (1941–2009), travel writer
- Paul Marlowe (living), novelist
- Thomas Guthrie Marquis (1864–1936), historian
- Marcel Mason (living), blogger
- Edward R. McDonald (1871–1952), novelist
- Oonah McFee (1916–2006), novelist, short story writer
- Bob Mersereau (living), journalist
- Shayne Michael (living), poet
- Gia Milani (living), screenwriter
- Mildred Milliea (1930–2019), linguist
- Kenneth G. Mills (1923–2004), poet, non-fiction writer
- Nathaniel G. Moore (born 1974), novelist
- Grace Helen Mowat (1875–1964), poet, non-fiction writer
- William Murdoch (1823–1887), poet
- Frances Elizabeth Murray (c. 1831–1901), biographer, memoirist

== N ==
- Robert Nielsen (1922–2009), journalist
- Alden Nowlan (1933–1983), poet, novelist, playwright

== O ==
- Jonathan Odell (1737–1818), poet
- Mary Blanche O'Sullivan (1860–)

== P ==
- Alisa Palmer (living), playwright
- Troy Parfitt (born 1972), travel writer
- Craig Poile (living), poet
- Pascal Poirier (1852–1933)
- Jacques Poitras (living), journalist, non-fiction writer
- Sharon Pollock (1936–2021), playwright
- John Alexander Porteous (1932–1995), journalist
- Kerry Lee Powell (living), poet, short story writer

== R ==
- William O. Raymond (1853–1923), historian
- Corey Redekop (living), novelist, short story writer
- Helen Leah Reed (1861/62–1926), essayist, novelist, poet
- David Adams Richards (born 1950), novelist, short story writer, non-fiction writer
- Charles G. D. Roberts (1860–1943), poet, novelist, non-fiction writer
- Theodore Goodridge Roberts (1877–1953), novelist, poet
- William Harris Lloyd Roberts (1884–1966), poet, playwright
- Ferdinand Robidoux (1849–1921)
- W. E. D. Ross (1912–1995), playwright, novelist

== S ==
- Francis Joseph Sherman (1871–1926), poet
- Anne-Marie Sirois (born 1958)
- Clara Kathleen Smith (1911–2004), poet
- Dan Soucoup (living), journalist, non-fiction writer
- Tim Steeves (died 2022), comedy writer

== T ==
- Hannah E. Taylor (1835–), poet
- Serge Patrice Thibodeau (born 1959), poet
- Stuart Trueman (1911–1995), journalist, humorist

== V ==
- R. M. Vaughan (1965–2020), poet, novelist, playwright, journalist
- Christl Verduyn (born 1953)

== W ==
- Michael Whelan (1858–1937), poet
- Alan R. Wilson (living), poet, novelist
- Hugh Winsor (born 1938), journalist
- Michelle Winters (living), novelist, playwright
- Esther Clark Wright (1895–1990), historian

== Y ==
- Michael Yerxa (living), screenwriter

== Z ==
- A. Light Zachary (living), poet

== See also ==
- Lists of Canadian writers
- List of writers from Newfoundland and Labrador
- List of writers from Nova Scotia
- List of writers from Prince Edward Island
