= Black Canadians in New Brunswick =

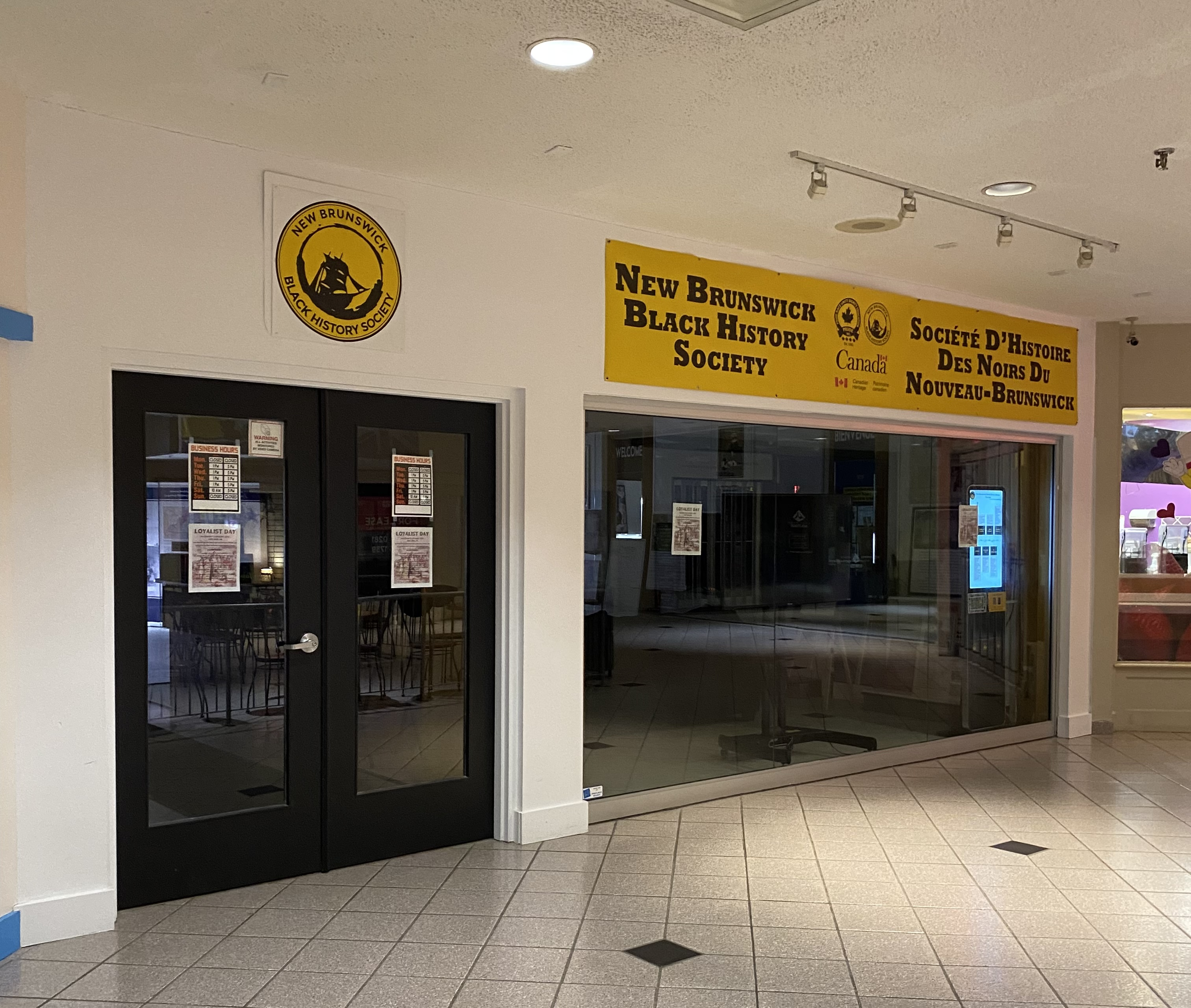
New Brunswick Black History Society, located in the Brunswick Square building in Saint John

Black Canadians in New Brunswick (known as Black New Brunswickers) refers to Black Canadians from the province of New Brunswick, notably of those whose ancestors, much like those of Black Nova Scotians, originated from the Colonial United States as slaves or freemen and arrived in New Brunswick during the 18th and early 19th centuries. As of the 2021 Canadian census, 12,155 Black people live in New Brunswick, making them the largest visible minority group in the province. The first recorded Black person in present-day New Brunswick was a Black man from New England who was forcibly taken during a French raid in the late 17th century.

== History ==
The first recorded Black person in present-day New Brunswick, documented by historian William O. Raymond in his 1905 publishing of Glimpses of the past: history of the River St. John, AD 1604–1784, was in the late 17th century when a Black man from Marblehead (in present-day Massachusetts) was forcibly taken up the Saint John River after a raid upon the New England Colonies. In 1696, the man was taken back by Benjamin Church during the Siege of Fort Nashwaak and brought to Boston. Raymond described the man as having been "probably the first of his race to set foot within the borders of New Brunswick."

In the mid-1780s, around 3,300 black loyalists arrived in Saint John following the American Revolutionary War under the promise of land grants from the British for serving in the army. Black individuals who settled in Saint John were unwelcomed and intentionally granted non-arable land, resulting in some having to survive by working as indentured servants. As a result, 1,196 Black settlers in New Brunswick and Nova Scotia left for Sierra Leone, following planning from Thomas Peters. An additional wave of 371 African-American refugees arrived in 1815, following the War of 1812.

In the early 1800s, one of Canada's first Black settlements, Elm Hill, was founded by Black loyalists. The first settlement in British North America to forbid slavery was Beaver Harbour, New Brunswick, which had been settled by Quaker loyalists. Slavery was outlawed altogether in New Brunswick by the British Slavery Abolition Act 1833.

New Brunswick established racially segregated schools throughout the 19th century. In 1883, the University of New Brunswick enrolled its first black student, Arthur St. George Richardson. The first black woman enrolled in the university, Mary Matilda Winslow, was enrolled in 1901.

The first human rights protest in New Brunswick occurred in 1916, when most of Saint John's Black community took part in protests over the showing of the controversial American movie The Birth of a Nation. The spiritual heart of Saint John's Black community was the St. Philips African Methodist Episcopalian Church, which was demolished in 1942.

In 1935, Eldridge "Gus" Eatman, a black sprinter and World War I soldier from Saint John tried to raise an Ethiopian Foreign Legion to fight for Ethiopia, which was threatened with an invasion by Italy. Eatman's call to defend Ethiopia drew an enthusiastic response to defend what the black lawyer Joseph Spencer-Pitt called "the last sovereign state belonging to the coloured race". However, it appears that no volunteers actually reached Ethiopia.

Since the immigration reforms of the 1970s, the province's multi-generational Black community has been joined by immigrants from the Caribbean and Africa. Some of the larger groups include Jamaicans, people from Democratic Republic of the Congo, (Note: According to Statistics Canada, for the period 2011-2016, there were 155 immigrants from the DRC, in comparison to just ten from the Republic of the Congo, who were resident in New Brunswick.) Haitians, and Nigerians. Meanwhile, many from New Brunswick's long established Black communities have moved out of the province. Bangor, Maine's lumber industry in particular attracted Black people from New Brunswick for decades. They formed a sizeable community on the town's west end throughout the 1900s.

The term Africadia was coined by George Elliott Clarke in the 1990s to refer to the combined group identity of African Canadian communities from Nova Scotia and New Brunswick.

=== New Brunswick Association for the Advancement of Colored People ===
The New Brunswick Association for the Advancement of Colored People (NBAACP) was established in 1959, which followed the Saint John Association for the Advancement of Colored People (SJAACP), which was founded in September 1949. One of the founding members was Frederick Hodges, who held the distinction of being the New Brunswick Federation of Labor's first black officer and the Saint John City Council's first visible minority.

In May 1964, Joseph Drummond, who served as the NBAACP vice president, organized a sit-in at a local barber shop along with two other members, in order to protest against the refusal of service towards colored people in Saint John's barber shops. Additionally, they sought to address the difficulties faced by people of color in achieving fair housing and employment opportunities.

=== 21st century ===
In 2010, the New Brunswick Black History Society (NBBHS), an organization dedicated to documenting and preserving black history in the province, was founded. Ralph Thomas, one of the organization's co-founders, is an activist who, along with the NBBHS, has done work in educating others about Black history in New Brunswick. In June 2021, the NBBHS opened the first permanent display dedicated to the preservation of New Brunswick's Black history in Saint John, following the opening of similar institutions such as the Black Cultural Centre for Nova Scotia and the Amherstburg Freedom Museum in Ontario.

On May 25, 2021, Kassim Doumbia was elected mayor of Shippagan, making him the first Black mayor in the province's history.

== Settlements ==
As in many Canadian provinces, independent rural all-Black settlements existed in New Brunswick since the 1800s. Two prominent settlements in New Brunswick were Willow Grove and Elm Hill. As of 2022, only the settlement of Elm Hill remains. The residents of Willow Grove are noted to be settled on extremely infertile land, where very little agriculture was possible. Commerce and industry was also difficult in Willow Grove due to the remoteness of the area from major cities at a time where most lacked access to vehicles or public transit. It was largely depopulated by the 1970s, when most young people chose to relocate to Saint John in search of a better range of opportunities. Woodstock and Kingsclear both had significant Black communities until the 1970s.

As of 2021, over 60% of New Brunswick's Black population lives in one of three cities: Moncton, Saint John, or Fredericton. The Indigenous Black Canadian population is heavily concentrated in Saint John, while the other two cities have attracted a growing immigrant African and Caribbean population.

== Notable people ==
- Measha Brueggergosman, opera singer
- Lawrence Costello, police officer killed in the 2018 Fredericton shooting
- Anna Minerva Henderson, teacher, civil servant and poet
- Manny McIntyre, professional baseball and ice hockey player
- Willie O'Ree, first Black player in the National Hockey League (NHL)
- Ralph Thomas, former amateur boxer and activist
- Fred Hodges, labour leader, civil rights activist, politician
- Joseph Drummond, civil rights activist

== See also ==
- Black Nova Scotians

== Bibliography ==
- Spray, W. A (1972). The Blacks in New Brunswick (PDF). Brunswick Press.
