= Joseph Drummond =

Canadian civil rights activist (1926–1975)

- Born: Joseph Stewart Drummond; April 7, 1926; Saint John, New Brunswick, Canada
- Died: January 13, 1975 (aged 48); Saint John, New Brunswick
- Occupation: Activist
- Movement: Civil rights
- Spouse: Verna Parker
- Children: 11

Joseph Stewart Drummond (April 7, 1926 – January 13, 1975) was a Canadian activist from Saint John, New Brunswick. He joined the NAACP and the civil rights movement in the United States and later in his home province.

Drummond was a key figure of the NBAACP, New Brunswick's branch of the NAACP. In 1964, he led a sit-in at a Saint John barbershop to protest against barbers refusing to serve Black people. He also served as a member of the New Brunswick Human Rights Commission and as the National Black Coalition of Canada's vice-chairman. Drummond also ran for the Parliament of Canada for the New Democratic Party during the 1972 federal election.

== Life and career ==
Joseph Stewart Drummond was born on April 7, 1926 in Saint John, New Brunswick, to John Drummond and Agnes Stewart. At the age of 15, he enlisted in the Royal Canadian Navy and was part of the HMCS Iroquois crew. While in Norfolk, Virginia, Drummond gained an interest in civil rights, later recounting that upon him and other sailors requiring hospitalization, he was racially segregated from his group and sent to "an inferior Negro hospital". In 1941, he joined the National Association for the Advancement of Colored People (NAACP). In 1957, Drummond started participating in activism; he was no longer a member of the Navy soon afterwards. In 1961, Drummond became a field worker in the NAACP's New York City headquarters and joined the Southern Christian Leadership Conference two years later.

Drummond also joined the NAACP in Saint John. On May 12, 1964, while serving as the vice-president of the New Brunswick Association for the Advancement of Colored People (NBAACP), he led a sit-in with two other NBAACP members at a barbershop in Saint John's Haymarket Square to protest the owner's refusal to serve Black men. The owner, Tom Arbing, had proclaimed that he had "never cut a colored person's hair in 55 years." Among those who also attended the sit-in included Noël Kinsella, a future Speaker of the Senate of Canada. When interviewed by the Telegraph-Journal, Drummond stated that "few barbers in Saint John are abiding by the New Brunswick Fair Accommodations Act," adding that "it is a terrible thing in a democracy when you send a child to a barbershop and he returns and asks why he was refused a haircut." He also spoke about discrimination beyond barbershops in the city, as well as about difficulties Black people faced concerning accessing suitable housing and employment. The sit-in was covered nationally; the New Brunswick Human Rights Commission was established in its aftermath. Publications later reported that Arbing changed his stance, with Arbing telling the Moncton Daily Times that he would "cut anyone's hair if he comes in and looks clean".

Drummond served as the National Black Coalition in Canada's vice-chairman. He was also a member of the New Brunswick Human Rights Commission, where in 1968 he presented police brutality complaints from Saint John that alleged instances of harassment against coloured students. Drummond later resigned from the Commission around 1971, (Note: Drummond's obituary by The Canadian Press states that he resigned from the position in 1971, although the same agency had claimed in 1972 that he was still a member.) citing his "frustration of trying to do a job and unable to get it done." Drummond was also briefly involved in politics, running as the New Democratic Party candidate for the federal Saint John—Lancaster riding during the 1972 federal election; he labelled himself as "an amateur politician" and had a focus on the "forgotten electorate," such as people who lived on welfare. He lost to the incumbent Thomas Miller Bell, a Progressive Conservative. Additionally, Drummond wrote the foreword page for W. A. Spray's 1972 publication The Blacks in New Brunswick.

== Personal life and death ==
Drummond was married to Verna Parker and had 11 children. He died on January 13, 1975 in Saint John, at the age of 48. His funeral was held three days later. In 2021, a mural containing two portraits of Drummond and Lena O'Ree, another civil rights activist in the city, was displayed in Saint John's north end neighbourhood.

== See also ==
- Black Canadians in New Brunswick
- Fred Hodges, another activist from Saint John. First visible minority elected in the Saint John City Council
- Ralph Thomas, activist and former boxer from Saint John. Co-founder of the New Brunswick Black History Society
