= New Brunswick Black History Society =

Canadian organization

- Société d'histoire des Noirs du Nouveau-Brunswick

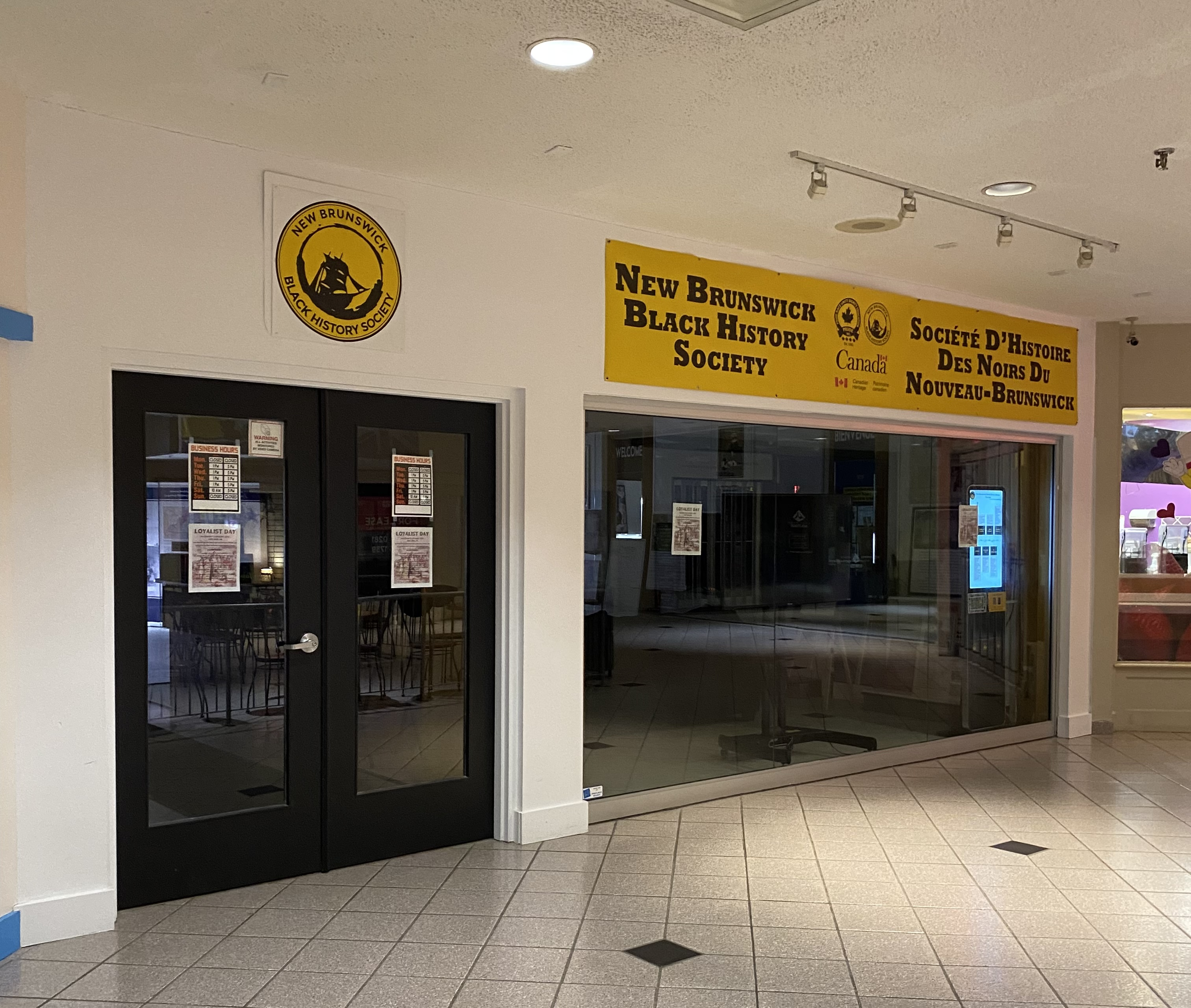
- NBBHS Location in Brunswick Square Mall, Saint John.
- Abbreviation: NBBHS
- Formation: June 2010; 16 years ago
- Founders: Ralph Thomas; Joe Gee; David Peters
- Location: Saint John, New Brunswick, Canada
- Coordinates: 45°16′24″N 66°3′40″W
- Region served: New Brunswick, Canada
- Board of directors: James A. Talbot; Denise W. Nauffts; Dr. Neville Sloane; Heather Hastings; Bianca Langille; Peter Larocque; Peter Little; Greg Marquis; Mary Louise McCarthy-Brandt; Graham Nickerson; Paryse Suddith
- Website: www.nbblackhistorysociety.org

The New Brunswick Black History Society (NBBHS; French: Société d'histoire des Noirs du Nouveau-Brunswick, SHSNB) is an organization based in New Brunswick, Canada, which is dedicated to researching, documenting, and preserving Black history in the province.

The organization has supported the renaming of locations with names tied to racism and slavery, improved the awareness of Black burial sites in the province, and opened New Brunswick's first Black History Heritage Site at the Brunswick Square in Saint John.

== History ==
The New Brunswick Black History Society was founded in June of 2010, under PRUDE Inc., which oversaw it.

In June 2021, the organization opened New Brunswick's first Black History Heritage Site, located in Brunswick Square in the city of Saint John. The heritage room, which displays exhibits providing information about escapees of slavery through the Underground Railroad as well as prominent black figures from New Brunswick, was created with the aim to educate residents about black history in the province, in similar fashion to centres in other provinces.

== Activities ==
=== Name changes ===
The New Brunswick Black History Society has made significant contributions in the renaming of several geographical locations and landmarks in New Brunswick that previously had racist names containing the ”N” slur. A number of these locations were subsequently renamed to commemorate early Black sellers in the province, such as the breakwater connecting Partridge Island to mainland Saint John, which was renamed to Hodges Point Breakwater to honor Fred Hodges, a local labor and civil rights leader.

=== Burial sites ===
The organization has also engaged in efforts to preserve and to raise awareness towards preserving Black burial sites in the province, such as the Black Settlement Burial Ground located in Willow Grove, which serves as the resting place for numerous Black Loyalists and refugees who sought refuge from the United States during the early 19th century.

In 2021, the NBBHS, along with affiliate organization PRUDE as well as local lawyers, raised funds for the installation of a headstone at the gravesite of Abraham Beverley Walker, the first Canadian-born Black lawyer, whose resting place was previously unmarked. On June 24, 2021, the newly erected headstone was unveiled at a cemetery in Saint John.
