= Ralph Thomas (activist) =

Canadian activist and former amateur boxer

Ralph Thomas ONB
- Born: 1938 (age 87–88); Saint John, New Brunswick, Canada
- Occupation: Activist
- Spouse: Judith Meinert (died 2022)

Ralph Thomas ONB (born 1938) is a Canadian activist and former amateur boxer from Willow Grove, New Brunswick, Canada. He was the president of Pride of Race, Unity and Dignity through Education (PRUDE), a New Brunswick-based organization promoting inclusion. He is also a co-founder of the New Brunswick Black History Society, an organization dedicated to promoting and preserving Black history in New Brunswick.

== Early life ==
Thomas was born in 1938 in Saint John and was raised in Willow Grove, a nearby settlement founded by Black refugees. Thomas grew up at a time where racism and racial segregation existed in Saint John, and siblings of his who lived there were restricted from entering certain establishments such as the Admiral Beatty Hotel.

== Early career ==
For a large part of his career, Thomas worked in the automotive trade industry. He also had a career in amateur boxing, in which he had a nickname "Tiger".

In 1966, Thomas founded the New Brunswick Amateur Boxing Association and served as its president for 20 years. He was also a 28-year long member of the board of directors of the Canadian Amateur Boxing Association. In 1968, he created Golden Gloves, a boxing club based in Saint John. In 1976, Thomas was inducted into the Canadian Boxing Hall of Fame as well as the New Brunswick Sports Hall of Fame in 2000.

== Activism ==
In 1997, Thomas became the president of PRUDE Inc. (Pride of Race, Unity and Dignity through Education), an advocacy group dedicated to assisting visible minorities and newcomers in Saint John. Through his advocacy work, Thomas has educated young people in the province about Black history.

In June 2010, Thomas co-founded the New Brunswick Black History Society (NBBHS), serving as the group's project coordinator. Through his advocacy work with other NBBHS and PRUDE Inc. members, Thomas has done several presentations educating others about Black history in New Brunswick. Through his work with the NBBHS, Thomas has contributed towards changing geographical names tied to racism and slavery, renaming them to honour historical Black figures in the province such as Abraham Beverley Walker.

Thomas has received multiple awards and accolades for his advocacy work, including the New Brunswick Human Rights Award in 2012, an honorary doctorate from the University of New Brunswick in 2019, the Sovereign's Medal for Volunteers in 2020, and the Order of New Brunswick in 2021.
