= Elaine J. McCarthy =

American projection and video designer (born 1966)

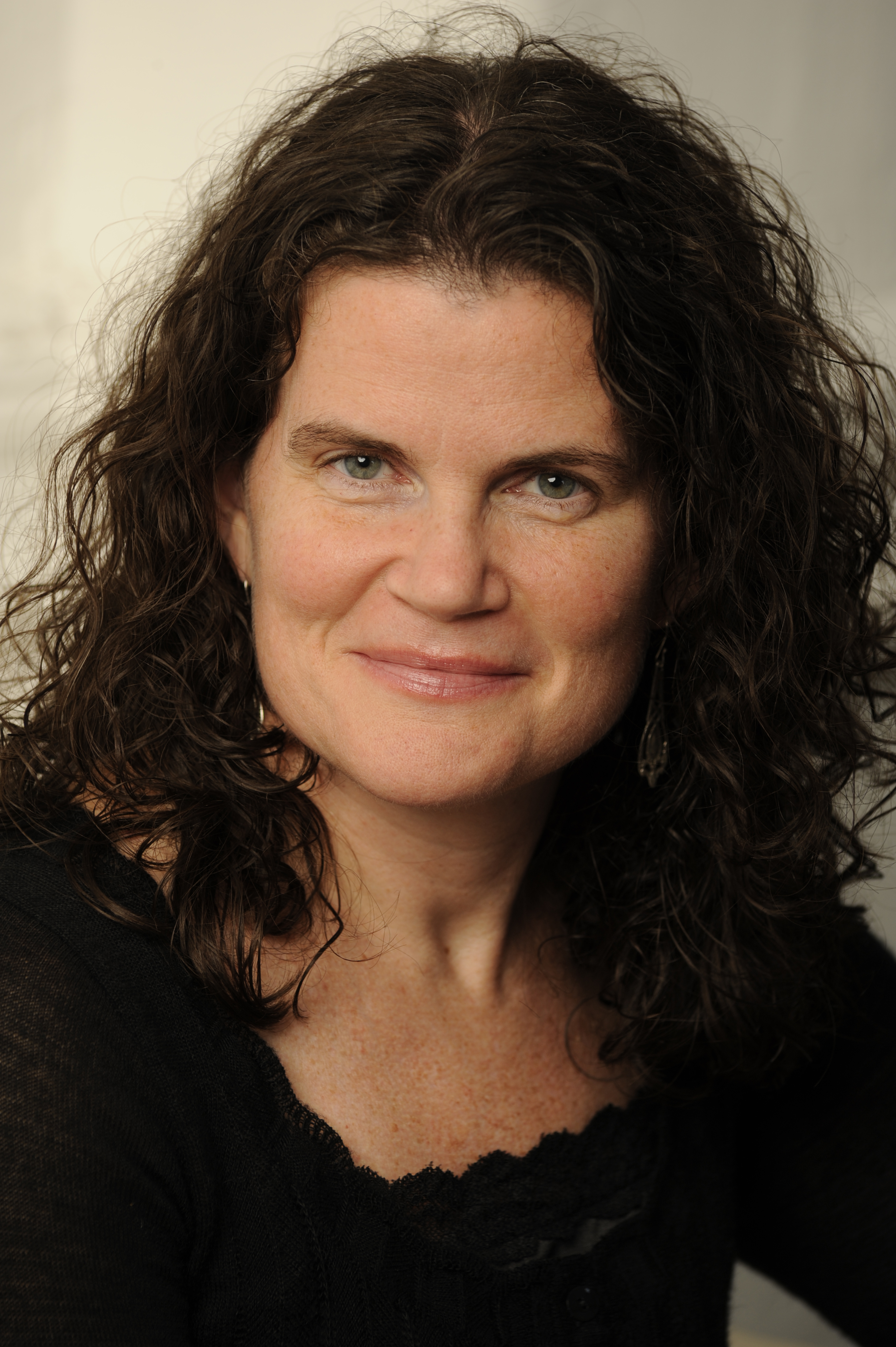
- McCarthy in 2003
- Born: May 11, 1966 (age 60); Woburn, Massachusetts, U.S.
- Occupation: video designer

Elaine J. McCarthy (born May 11, 1966) is an American projection and video designer for theater and opera.

== Early life ==
She was born in Woburn, Massachusetts, and grew up in nearby Arlington, Massachusetts.

Intending to study Political Science, McCarthy initially attended Catholic University in Washington, D.C. but found herself drawn to the Architecture studio. She subsequently left to take a semester of architectural courses at Harvard University Graduate School of Design then a year at University of Massachusetts Boston studying Photography and Scenic design. She eventually enrolled at New York University where she earned a BFA in Photography & Imaging from the Tisch School of the Arts, Maurice Kanbar Institute of Film & Television.

== Career ==
=== Early career ===
McCarthy held an administrative job in the early years of the Massachusetts Institute of Technology Media Lab, where she learned about computers. “I was exposed to the most bleeding-edge technology and everybody in that environment had a point of view to add, whether you were a tenured Professor, or, like me, a glorified Secretary — it was all part of the mix. That was my first exposure to a barrier-free environment.” This experience led her to the MIT Community Players which was her first exposure to the idea of theater as a potential career. After that she worked with an Experimental theatre company, the Pilgrim Theater Research and Performance Collaborative. While stage managing for them at the Edinburgh Festival it became clear to her that she wished to pursue a career in theater. She eventually worked her way to New York City working as a design assistant to noted projection designer Wendall K. Harrington through whose studio many of today's top projection design practitioners have passed. This is where she saw her varied interests in technology, art, design, photography, architecture, film and theater come together in one discipline, projection design for theater.”

She has since gone on to work with a diverse group of notable Theatre directors including Leonard Foglia, Michael Greif, Kristin Hanggi, Andrei Konchalovsky, James Lapine, Joe Mantello, Michael Mayer, Dejan Miladinović, Mike Nichols, Jack O'Brien, Diane Paulus, Tim Robbins, Peter Sellars, Julie Taymor, John Tillinger and Rob Urbinati.

=== Broadway ===
She has many Broadway productions to her credit including After the Fall (2004 revival), Good Vibrations, The Green Bird, Judgment at Nuremberg, the Tony Award nominated productions of Man Of La Mancha (2002 Revival) and Wicked (the 4th longest-running Broadway show and the 10th longest-running West End show) as well as the Tony Award winning productions of Into The Woods (2002 Revival), Assassins and Monty Python's Spamalot.

=== Opera ===
She designed projections for Tan Dun's adaptation of The Peony Pavilion at the Wiener Festwochen as well as Tchaikovsky´s Mazeppa and the Andrei Konchalovsky directed production of Prokofiev's War and Peace, both co-productions of the Kirov Opera at the Mariinsky Theater in Saint Petersburg and the Metropolitan Opera in New York City. She recently designed Alfredo Catalani's La Wally and Tchaikovsky's rarely performed Iolanta for The Dallas Opera.

In August 2015 McCarthy designed projections for the world premiere of the new opera Cold Mountain composed by Jennifer Higdon with a libretto by Gene Scheer at the Santa Fe Opera.

In the Fall of 2015 McCarthy returned to the Dallas Opera to design projections for the world premier production of Great Scott, a new opera by Jake Heggie and Terrence McNally directed by Jack O'Brien with Sets and Costumes by Bob Crowley and Lighting by Brian MacDevitt .

McCarthy designed projections for the world premiere of Jake Heggie's new opera It's a Wonderful Life for the Houston Grand Opera December 2016. The production was directed by Leonard Foglia with Sets by Robert Brill, Lighting by Brian Nason and Costumes by David C. Woolard.

=== Off Broadway and Regional ===
Fall 2018 McCarthy designed projections for Gloria: A Life, the story of Gloria Steinem at the Daryl Roth Theatre starring Christine Lahti in the title role. It is written by Emily Mann and directed by Diane Paulus with scenic design by Amy Rubin, costume design by Jessica Jahn, lighting design by Jeanette Yew and sound design by Leah Gelpe.

Late summer 2016 McCarthy designed projections for the New England premier production of Notes from the Field: Doing Time in Education, created, written and performed by Anna Deavere Smith in Boston at the American Repertory Theater (A.R.T.) then it moved to New York City's Second Stage Theater that fall. Directed by Leonard Foglia with Set design by Riccardo Hernandez, costume design by Ann Hould-Ward, lighting design by Howell Binkley

=== Recent and planned projects ===
McCarthy designed sets and projections for the world premiere of Joby Talbot's new opera The Diving Bell and the Butterfly for the Dallas Opera, originally scheduled for the 2020-21 season but postponed until fall of 2023 due to the COVID-19 pandemic. The production was directed by Leonard Foglia with Lighting by Gavin Swift and Costumes by David C. Woolard.

McCarthy designed the Fort Worth Symphony Orchestra's performance of Haydn: The Creation presented in May 2023. Conducted by Robert Spano.

McCarthy is a frequent collaborator with Director Leonard Foglia. She designed projections for his Off-Broadway production The Stendhal Syndrome; his Broadway productions Thurgood, and The People in the Picture; and his production of the Opera's Dead Man Walking for the New York City Opera as well as the World Premiere productions of Moby-Dick and Everest for the Dallas Opera and El Pasado Nunca se Termina for the Lyric Opera of Chicago for which she designed both Sets and Projections. “What Elaine is able to do,” he says, “is to use my ideas as a departure for her own creativity. She will take my ideas and lift it out to a level I could never have imagined. It's what I pray every designer will do.”

=== Academic ===
She is currently a Guest Lectrurer in Design for Advanced Discussions in Directing and Scenography at the David Geffen School of Drama at Yale University where she previously was a Lecturer in Design teaching Projection Design in Practice. She has also been an Adjunct instructor at Boston University College of Fine Arts, School of Theatre, Emerson College., New York University Tisch School of the Arts, Rutgers University, Mason Gross School of the Arts and Texas State University and has been a guest lecturer at City University of New York College of Technology, Pace University, University of Alabama, University of Maryland, University of North Carolina School of the Arts, Wesleyan University, University of Wisconsin, and numerous others.

She appeared as a guest speaker at the USITT Conference, Live Design's L.D.I. and Opera America's Opera Conference.

McCarthy is a member of United Scenic Artists local 829 labor union representing designers in the entertainment industries in both the Projection designer and Scenic designer categories. She is also a member of USITT and was a Lucille Lortel Award voter 2019-2022. McCarthy is an Associate Volunteer for as well as a member of the Steering Committee of The 1/52 Project, founded by Scenic designer Beowulf Boritt in 2022 as a financial grant program financed and run by working designers to encourage early career designers from historically excluded groups.

== Awards ==
In 2020 McCarthy was honored with the USITT Distinguished Achievement Award for Digital Media.

McCarthy's projection design work on Gloria: A Life was recognized with the American Theater Wing's Henry Hewes Design Award Nomination for Notable Effects in August 2019.

In June 2019 McCarthy won a Betty Mitchell Award for Outstanding Projection or Video Design for her work on Everest at the Calgary Opera.

McCarthy was nominated in 2017 for the Drama Desk Award the Lucille Lortel Award and the Henry Hewes Design Award for Outstanding Projection Design for Notes from the Field at Second Stage and for an IRNE Award in the category Large Theater: Best Projection Design for Notes from the Field at the American Repertory Theater.

McCarthy was nominated for Best Video Design for Entertainment Today's Ticketholder Award in 2010 for Thurgood at the Geffen Playhouse.

McCarthy was nominated for the Henry Hewes Design Award in 2009 for Notable Effects for Frequency Hopping produced by the Hourglass Group at the 3LD Arts & Technology Center in New York City for which she designed both the scenery and projections. The production was noted for its use of a fully robotic orchestra as well as McCarthy's utilization of Musion Eyeliner, which is a modern version of the 19th century Pepper's Ghost effect.

McCarthy was nominated for Best Video Design for Entertainment Today's Ticketholder Award in 2007 for the Center Theatre Group's World Premier production of Lisa Loomer's play Distracted at the Mark Taper Forum for which she designed both Sets and Projections

In 2003 she was awarded an Entertainment Design Magazine (now Live Design) Eddy Award for Projection Design Excellence

== Personal life ==
McCarthy is married, has a daughter and lives in Connecticut.
