= Betty Award =

Annual theatre awards in Calgary, Alberta, Canada

- Current: 22nd Betty Awards
- Awarded for: Outstanding achievement in Calgary's professional theatre community
- Country: Canada
- First award: 1998; 28 years ago
- Website: bettymitchellawards.com

Betty Mitchell Awards were created in 1998 to celebrate and honour outstanding achievement in Calgary's professional theatre community. It is commonly called the Betty Award and is named for Calgary theatre pioneer Dr. Betty Mitchell.

== Awards ==
The awards ceremony for the 2018–19 season was held on June 24 at the Vertigo Theatre in Calgary.

In 2019, Pakistani-Canadian actor Ahad Raza Mir, the first Pakistani actor to play Hamlet in Canada, won the Betty for Outstanding Performance by an Actor in a Drama for his performance of the title role In that same year Tiffany Ayalik became the first Inuk recipient of a Betty Award.

=== Categories ===
Awards are given in the following categories:

- Outstanding Performance by an Ensemble
- Outstanding Performance by an Actress in a Supporting Role
- Outstanding Lighting Design
- Outstanding Set Design
- Outstanding Performance by an Actor in a Supporting Role

•Outstanding Projection or Video Design
2024
2024	Beth Kates	Meteor Shower
2024	Scott Reid	A Christmas Carol
2024	Brendan Briceland	Selma Burke
2024	David Bengali	Beaches The Musical
2024	Brendan Briceland	Girl on the Train
2023
2023	Andy Moro	Hookman
2023	Scott Reid	Agatha Christie's Murder on the Orient Express
2023	Andy Moro	The Extractionist
2023	Cindy Mochizuki (Video Design & animation), Sammy Chien/Chimerik Collective (Projection Design)	Forgiveness
2023	Wladimiro A. Woyno R.	STRUCK
2022
2022	Nicolas Dostie, Irina Litvinenko, Rick Miller	Boom YZ
2022	Jamie Nesbitt	Cipher
2022	Jamie Nesbitt	In Wonderland
2022	Scott Reid	A Christmas Carol
2022	Scott Reid	Million Dollar Quartet
2019
2019	Nicolas Dotsie	BOOM X
2019	Bretta Gerecke	The Invisible Agents of Ungentlemanly Warfare
2019	Amelia Scott	A Love Letter to Emily C
2019	Andy Moro	Honour Beat
2019	Elaine J. McCarthy	Everest
2018
2018	Jamie Nesbitt	Nine Dragons
2018	Remy Siu	Empire of the Son
2018	T. Erin Gruber	Easter Island
2018	Corwin Ferguson	Julius Caesar
2018	Amelia Scott	To the Light
2017
2017	Corwin Ferguson	Richard III
2017	David Leclerc	BOOM
2017	Jamie Nesbitt	The Big Sleep
2017	Amelia Scott with illustrations by Tyler Jenkins	Crime Does Not Pay
2017	JP Thibodeau	Lest We Forget
2016
2016	Jamie Nesbitt	Calamity Town
2016	Sean Nieuwenhuis	The Little Prince
2016	Scott Reid	Die Tote Stadt
2016	JP Thibodeau	The Boy’s Own Jedi Handbook
2016	Amelia Scott and Joel Adria	Cockroach
2015
2015	Andrzej Goulding	Silent Night
2015	Jamie Nesbitt	Liberation Days
2015	Jamie Nesbitt	Farewell, My Lovely
2015	Kalyna Conrad	Legoland
2015	Wladimiro A. Woyno R., Matthew Waddell and Laura Anzola	The Last Voyage of Donald Crowhurst
2014
2014	Kaely Dekker	n00b
2014	Corwin Ferguson	You Will Remember Me
2014	T. Erin Gruber	A Bomb in the Heart
2014	Jamie Nesbitt	The Hound of the Baskervilles
2014	Sean Nieuwenhuis	The Mountaintop

- Outstanding Costume Design
- Outstanding Sound Design or Composition
- Outstanding Choreography or Fight Direction
- Outstanding Musical Direction
- Outstanding Performance by an Actress in a Comedy or Musical
- Outstanding Performance by an Actor in a Comedy or Musical
- Outstanding New Play
- Outstanding Direction
- Outstanding Performance by an Actress in a Drama
- Outstanding Performance by an Actor in a Drama
- Outstanding Production of a Musical
- Outstanding Production of a Play

=== Ceremony ===
Betty Mitchell Award Ceremonies
Ceremony	Venue	Date	Host(s)
1st	Stage West	August 24, 1998	Lindsay Burns
2nd	Stage West	August 30, 1999	
3rd	Stage West	August 28, 2000	
4th	Stage West	August 28, 2001	Dave Kelly; Elizabeth Stepkowski
5th	Stage West	August 26, 2002	Dave Kelly; Karen Johnson-Diamond
6th	Stage West	August 25, 2003	Mark Bellamy; Kevin Rothery
7th	Stage West	August 30, 2004	
8th	Stage West	August 29, 2005	Bob White; Laura Parken
9th	Stage West	August 28, 2006	Grant Linneberg
10th	Stage West	2007	
11th	Stage West	August 25, 2008	Dave Kelly
12th	Max Bell Theatre, EPCOR CENTRE for the Performing Arts	August 24, 2009	
13th	Max Bell Theatre, EPCOR CENTRE for the Performing Arts	August 30, 2010	AJ Demers; Julie Orton
14th	Stage West	August 20, 2011	Karen Johnson-Diamond; Kevin Rothery
15th	Stage West	August 27, 2012	Russell Bowers
16th	Stage West	August 26, 2013	Nicole Zylstra; Stafford Perry
17th	Stage West	August 18, 2014	Stephen Hair
18th	Vertigo Theatre	August 24, 2015	Julie Orton
19th	Vertigo Theatre	2016	Josh Bertwistle, Carly McKee; Chris Enright, Nicole Zylstra
20th	Vertigo Theatre	2017	Mark Bellamy; Selena Wong
21st	Vertigo Theatre	June 25, 2018	Katherine Fadum; Michael Tan
22nd	Vertigo Theatre	June 24, 2019	Raven Virginia

== Statue update ==
The original Betty Mitchell Award statue, designed by local Calgary sculptor, Petronella Overes, was inspired by the geography surrounding Calgary. It was a steel base containing a glass monolith with motifs of mountains and prairies. For the 10th anniversary of the awards in 2007 she redesigned it replacing the steel base with powder coated aluminum and increased the contrast in the tone and texture of the awards metal and glass.

The Award received its most recent design update in 2014 when the Overes design was replaced with a multi-colour teardrop-shaped glass sculpture created by a local glass blowing collective, Bee Kingdom Glass. Each one is unique, as they are hand-blown.

== See also ==
- Black Theatre Workshop
- Dora Mavor Moore Award
- Elizabeth Sterling Haynes Award
- Floyd S. Chalmers Canadian Play Award
- Gascon-Thomas Award
- Jessie Richardson Theatre Award
- Rideau Awards
- Robert Merritt Awards
