= Neith (disambiguation) =

Neith is an Egyptian goddess.

Neith may also refer to:

== People ==
- Neith (wife of Pepi II), one of three principal queens of the Old Kingdom pharaoh Pepi II, who ruled (c. 2278 BC–c. 2184 BC)
- Neith Boyce (1872–1951), American novelist, journalist, and theatre artist
- Neith Hunter, American model and actress
- Neith Nevelson (born 1946), American artist

== Other uses ==
- Neith (hypothetical moon), a hypothetical moon of Venus
- Neith (crater), a crater on Jupiter's moon Ganymede
- Neith, the Orbital Frame of Viola in the Zone of the Enders game by Konami
- 1122 Neith, an asteroid
- Neith Nunatak, a nunatak on Mount Moffat, Antarctica
- Neith (magazine), a magazine
