= Peter Clark =

Peter Clark may refer to:

- Peter Clark (footballer, born 1979), retired English professional footballer
- Peter Clark (footballer, born 1938) (1938–2008), English footballer
- Peter Clark (historian) (born 1944), British historian
- Peter Clark (athlete) (1933–2014), British long-distance runner
- Peter D. Clark (politician) (born 1938), Canadian politician
- Peter D. Clark (writer), Canadian writer, storyteller and folklore collector
- Peter H. Clark (1829–1925), American abolitionist and socialist

== See also ==
- Peter Clarke (disambiguation)
