= St Lawrence Shakespeare Festival =

Annual theatre festival in Prescott, Ontario

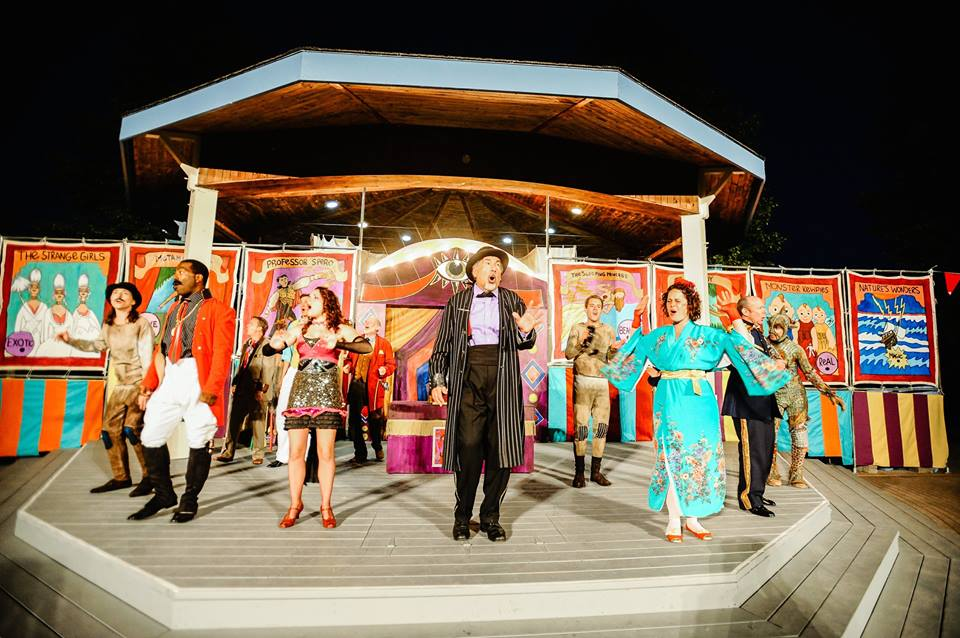
2014 St Lawrence Shakespeare Festival production of The Tempest

The St Lawrence Shakespeare Festival (SLSF) runs annually in Prescott, Ontario in July and August. SLSF contracts professional actors through Canadian Actors Equity Association, is a member of PACT (the Professional Association of Canadian Theatres), and a member of the Shakespeare Theatre Association. The offerings of the Festival are based on two main stage shows that run from mid-July to mid-August (often, but not always, both plays by Shakespeare) as well as additional productions that are presented in shorter runs of fewer performances.

SLSF was founded in 2002, when Artistic Director Deborah Smith brought a small touring production of Romeo and Juliet through Prescott for a single performance. During that visit, Smith saw the open-air amphitheatre that had been constructed overlooking the harbour, and made arrangements with then mayor, Sandra S. Lawn (after whom the harbour is now named) to return the following year, 2003, to mount a full production of The Tempest.

Three Artistic Directors have followed. Ian Farthing, who had acted with the Festival, was appointed in 2005 and held the position until 2014. Farthing increased the number of mainstage productions from one to two, added a Sunday series of special events and an educational program. Highlights of those years included a 2011 production of Twelfth Night, which won the Prix Rideau Award for Outstanding Production in the greater Ottawa-Gatineau region, and adaptations by Canadian playwrights of some less frequently produced works by Shakespeare such as The Merry Wives of Windsor (adapted by playwright John Lazarus for Prescott's 200th anniversary year as Trouble on Dibble Street), and Love's Labour's Lost (adapted by playwright Lucia Frangione to a War of 1812 setting as A Maid for a Musket). In 2014, SLSF won the distinction of being the only Canadian Theatre to present Shakespeare's Globe Theatre's international touring production of Hamlet, for two sold-out performances. Rona Waddington followed Farthing, programming the next three years of the Festival. Innovations introduced by Waddington included recruiting a team of local volunteers to play crowds and soldiers in productions of Julius Caesar and Antony and Cleopatra, facilitating work on a scale that had not yet been seen at the Festival, and a series of “Community Productions”, in which post-season productions were directed by Waddington, as fundraisers for the Festival, that exclusively featured local amateur actors After the 2017 season, Waddington departed and Richard Sheridan Willis, who had appeared in the festival as an actor for three seasons was named as the new Artistic Director. The 2018 season is Willis's first programmed as Artistic Director.
