= Mary Winslow =

Mary Winslow may refer to:

- Mary Winslow, wife of John Sibley (doctor)
- Mary Blythe Winslow, sponsor of the USS Winslow
- Mary Chilton (1607–1679), or Mary Chilton Winslow after marriage
- Mary Matilda Winslow, first Black Canadian female graduate of the University of New Brunswick
- Mary Nelson Winslow (1887–1952), U.S. Department of Labor Women's Bureau leader and Inter-American Commission of Women delegate
- Mary Winslow Smyth (1873–1937), American folklorist and folksong collector
