= Black Settlement Burial Ground =

Canadian cemetery

Black Settlement Burial site
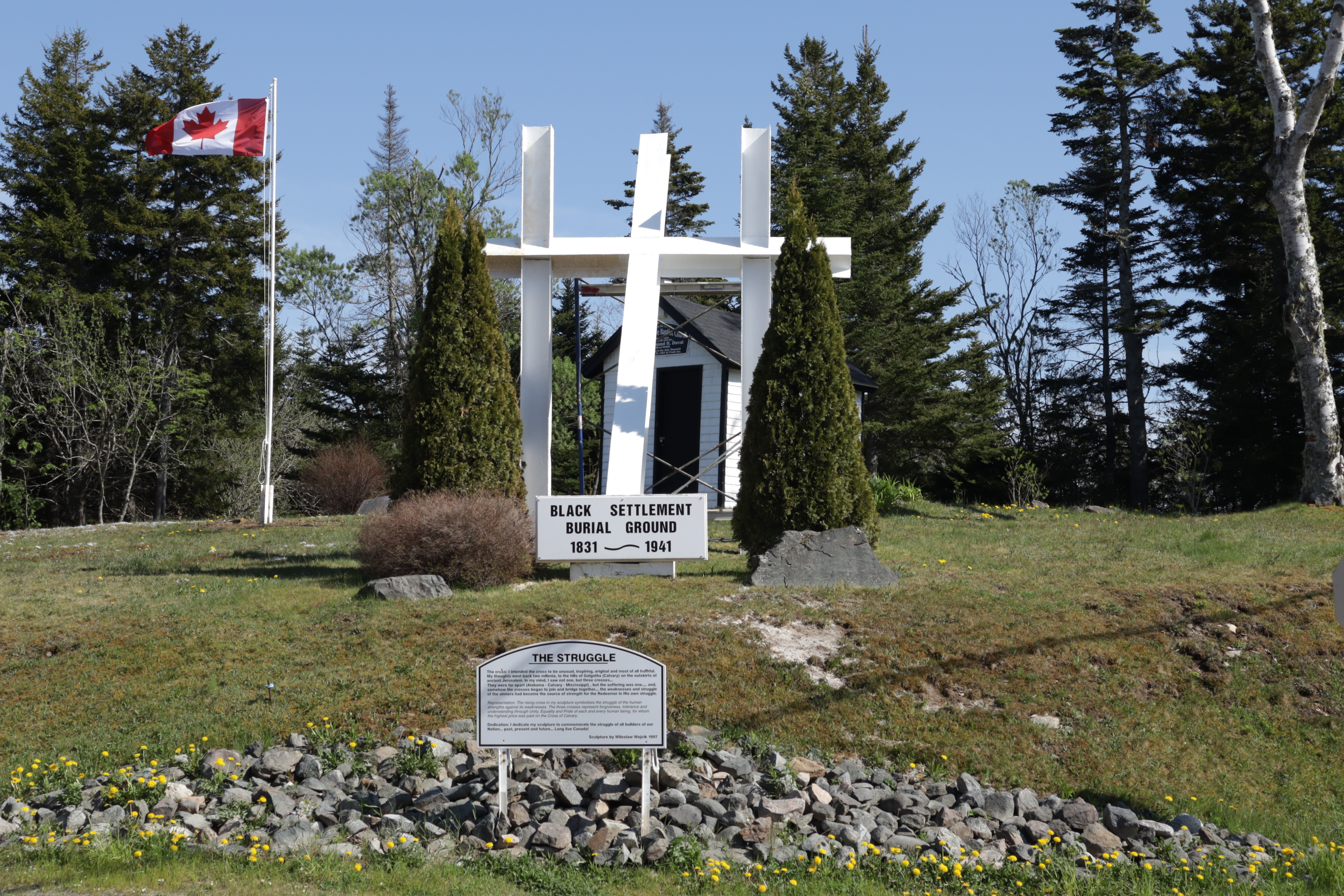
- Interactive map of Black Settlement Burial site

Details
- Established: 1831
- Location: Willow Grove, New Brunswick, Canada
- Coordinates: 45.32847°N 65.81487°W
- Find a Grave: Black Settlement Burial site

Black Settlement Burial Site, is a cemetery in Willow Grove, near Saint John, New Brunswick, Canada.

It is located uphill from Saint John harbour, and has a view of nearby market and the harbour.

The cemetery was founded in 1831, and is the resting place for many American Black loyalists and Black refugees who left the US for Saint John during the War of 1812. Around the same time, the location also housed a church and a school for the Black community. A replica church was constructed in 2024. There are no grave markers in the cemetery.

The cemetery was refurbished in 2015. The cemetery featured in Anna Minerva Henderson's sonnet The Old Burying Ground.
