= Theatre Calgary =

Theatre company in Calgary, Alberta, Canada

- Former names: MAC, MAC 14
- Location: 220 9th Avenue SE; Calgary, Alberta; T2G 5C4
- Capacity: 750

Website
- www.theatrecalgary.com

Theatre Calgary, is a theatre company in Calgary, Alberta, Canada, established as a professional company in 1968. It was preceded by Workshop 14, a theatre study group founded in 1944 by Betty Mitchell. Calgary's Betty Mitchell awards are named after her.

== Artistic Directors ==
- Christopher Newton (1968–1971)
- Clarke Rogers (1971–1972)
- Harold G. Baldridge (1972–1978)
- Rick McNair (1978–1984)
- Sharon Pollock (1984–1985)
- Martin Kinch (1985–1991)
- Brian Rintoul (1991–1996)
- James Brewer, Acting Artistic Director (1996–1997)
- Ian Prinsloo (1997–2005)
- Dennis Garnhum (2005–2016)
- Shari Wattling, Interim Artistic Director (2016–2017)
- Stafford Arima (2017–present)

== 2017–2018 season ==
- Blow Wind High Water - by Sharon Pollock
- Sisters: The Belles Soeurs Musical - based on the play by Michel Tremblay, book and lyrics by René Richard Cyr, music by Daniel Belanger
- Twelfth Night - by William Shakespeare
- The Humans - by Stephen Karam
- The Secret Garden - book and lyrics by Marsha Norman, music by Lucy Simon
- As You Like It - by William Shakespeare
- A Christmas Carol - by Charles Dickens, shown from 20-22 November 2020, adapted by Dennis Garnhum
- Onegin - by Amiel Gladstone and Veda Hille

== 2022-2023 season ==
- Lady Day at Emerson's Bar and Grill - by Lanie Robertson
- The Importance of Being Earnest - by Oscar Wilde
- Little Women - by Kate Hamill, adapted from the novel by Louisa May Alcott
- Little Red Warrior and His Lawyer - by Kevin Loring
- Forgiveness - by Mark Sakamoto, stage adaptation by Hiro Kanagawa
- Jimmy Buffett's Escape to Margaritaville - Music & Lyrics by Jimmy Buffett, Book by Greg Garcia & Mike O'Malley
