= Peter Clarke =

Peter Clarke may refer to:

== Arts and entertainment ==
- Peter Clarke (artist) (1929–2014), South African artist
- Peter Clarke (cartoonist) (1935–2012), British cartoonist
- Peter Clarke (drummer) (born 1957), English drummer, a.k.a. "Budgie"
- Peter Metro (Peter Clarke, c. 1960), Jamaican reggae deejay

== Sports ==
- Peter Clarke (cricketer) (1881–1915), Irish cricketer
- Peter Clarke (rugby league) (born 1974), Australian rugby league footballer
- Peter Clarke (tennis) (born 1979), Irish tennis player
- Peter Clarke (footballer) (born 1982), English footballer
- Peter Clarke (American football), English player of American football

== Others ==
- Sir Peter Clarke (courtier) (1927–2006), British Army officer and courtier
- Peter Clarke (chess player) (1933–2014), British chess player and writer
- Peter B. Clarke (1940–2011), British religious scholar
- Peter Clarke (historian) (born 1942), English historian
- Peter Clarke (social worker) (1948–2007), Welsh child welfare activist
- Peter Clarke (police officer) (born 1955), English police officer

== See also ==
- Peter Clark (disambiguation)
- Peter Russell-Clarke (1935–2025), Australian television personality and author
