= Everest (opera) =

Opera by Joby Talbot

- Opera by Joby Talbot
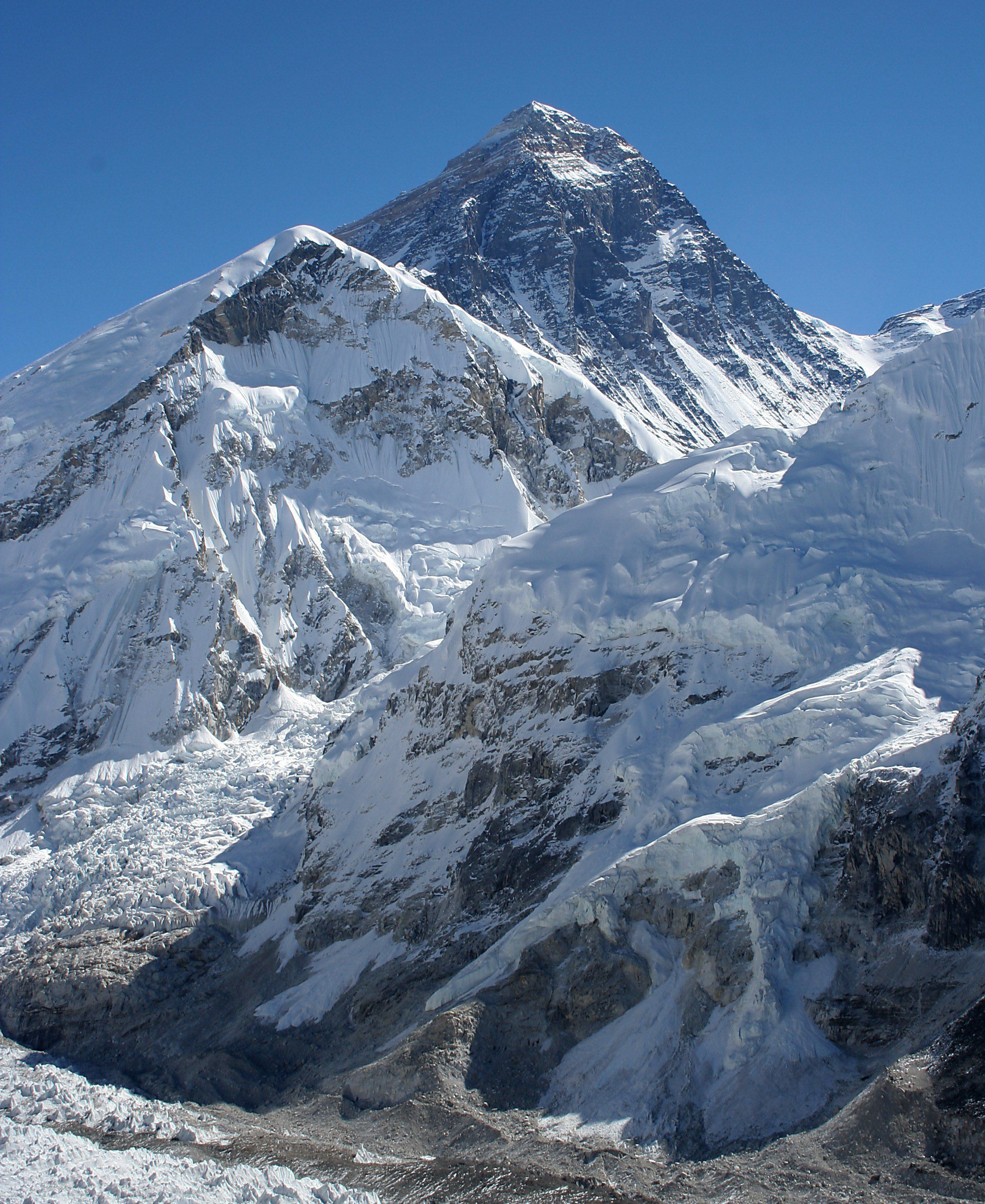
- Summit of Mount Everest from southwest
- Librettist: Gene Scheer
- Language: English
- Premiere: January 30, 2015; Dallas Opera Characters: Jan Arnold (mezzo-soprano); Meg Weathers, young girl, (mezzo-soprano); Rob Hall (tenor); Doug Hansen (baritone); Beck Weathers (bass-baritone); Guy Cotter (baritone, enhanced with walkie-talkie effect); Mike Groom (baritone); The Dead of Everest (Choir, SATB, at least 16 singers)

Everest is a one-act opera by Joby Talbot to an English-language libretto by Gene Scheer. It was composed in 2014 and premiered on January 30, 2015, at the Margot and Bill Winspear Opera House of Dallas Opera. The content deals with a real event, the 1996 Mount Everest disaster, in which several mountaineers died after a severe storm hit during their summit bids. It is based on interviews with survivors and shows in two strands the deaths of Rob Hall and Doug Hansen and the emotional world of Beck Weathers.

== History ==
Everest was commissioned by Dallas Opera in 2014. At the world premiere on January 30, 2015 in Dallas Sasha Cooke (Jan Arnold), Julia Rose Arduino (Meg Weathers), Andrew Bidlack (Rob Hall), Craig Verm (Doug Hansen), Kevin Burdette (Beck Weathers), John Boehr (Guy Cotter) and Mark McCrory (Mike Groom) sang. The musical direction was by Nicole Paiement. The production was directed by Leonard Foglia, the set design by Robert Brill (Betty Award), costume design by David C. Woolard and projection design by Elaine J. McCarthy (Betty Award)

On May 5, 2017, on the occasion of the Opera America Conference 2017, there was a concert performance at the Winspear Opera House under the direction of Emmanuel Villaume. In November 2017, the original staging of the opera was performed by the Lyric Opera of Kansas City at the Kauffman Center for the Performing Arts and again in 2019 at Calgary Opera.

The European premiere took place on May 5, 2018 at the Theater Hagen in a production by Johannes Erath conducted by Joseph Trafton. Stage and costumes came from Kaspar Glarner. The leading roles were sung by Veronika Haller (Jan Arnold), Musa Nkuna (Rob Hall), Kenneth Maltice (Doug Hansen), Morgan Moody (Beck Weathers), and Elizabeth Pilon (Meg Weathers). For this production, director Corinna Jarosch attempted "to make the hallucinations of the mountaineers visible" rather than depict the mountain world realistically. The plot was moved to a mountain sanatorium in reference to Thomas Mann's novel The Magic Mountain, published three months after the 1924 British Mount Everest expedition by George Mallory and Andrew Irvine.

In 2021 the Opera Parallèle presented Everest in a graphic novel form using studio recordings of the singers and a motion capture process to capture the motions of the singers. The film was released digitally through the Dallas Opera. In 2023, Opera Parallèle used the digital recordings for an in person show, Everest, An Immersive Experience. In 2024, the background animations were modified to be projected onto a dome and presented at the California Academy of Sciences planetarium. The planetarium version won a 2025 Dome Fest West award for Best Musical Feature Film.

== Plot ==
May 10, 1996: On the Hillary Step of Mt. Everest, pathologist Beck Weathers lies unconscious in a snowdrift as mountaineer Rob Hall leads his group to the summit. While they enjoy the view, Weathers hallucinates being at a barbecue with his daughter Meg. Hall helps one of the group members, Doug Hansen, to reach the top as the rest of the group heads back down. As Hall takes Hansen's picture, the action flashes back to show Hall's wife Jan awaiting his return in New Zealand. Jan has climbed Everest once before, but her pregnancy prevented her from making this trip. When the flashback ends, Hansen begins to have trouble breathing. Hall tries to reach the base camp by radio to get help and oxygen.

The scene shifts back to Weathers' hallucination of his daughter Meg playing jumprope. Not recognizing his daughter, Weathers takes the jumprope from Meg and straps himself to the rope. Back to consciousness, he realizes that the rest of the group has not returned. It begins to snow and the sunset is approaching. Mike Groom, another expedition member, finds Weathers and urges him to descend just as a storm breaks out. Meanwhile, Jan realizes her husband may be in trouble and she makes contact with the base camp. Mountain guide Guy Cotter, reporting from the camp, urges Hall to leave Hansen behind and save himself.

The members of the expedition discover the confused Weathers. While Jan waits for the next call, Hall tries to bring Hansen to safety. He is too late and Hansen joins the chorus, which represents those who have died climbing Mt. Everest. Hall reports Hansen's death to the base camp via radio and asks for Cotter's help in establishing telephone contact with Jan.

At 2:00 AM on May 11, the other members of the expedition begin to leave one by one. Hall contacts his wife. They agree on the name "Sarah" for their unborn child and assure themselves of their love just before Hall dies, joining Hansen in the chorus. Weathers, still hallucinating, hears his daughter calling for him in the distance and finally reaches the base camp.

== Structure ==
The authors stated they did not wish the opera to be a standard "heroic epic." Thus, the plot is composed of individual report fragments and flashbacks, rather than being told in a linear fashion, and the characters' motivations are deliberately left unclear.

The music sounds contemporary modern, but is nevertheless based on traditional harmonics and emotionally shaped. In the vocal parts, Talbot refers to traditional forms by means of indications such as "aria" or "quartet." The orchestral sound fabric ties in with minimal music that is akin to that of John Adams. At the same time, there are references to Giacomo Puccini, Leonard Bernstein, Benjamin Britten or Igor Stravinsky. There is a focus on rhythm and the spectrum of timbres, with numerous sound effects such as the crackling radio or the howling of the wind. The mountain itself has its own voice, produced by the low wind instruments and percussion, and inspired by the slow cracking movements of glacial masses over rocky ground.

Elements of dance music were particularly considered in the 2018 Hagen production.

=== Instrumentation ===
The instrumentation consists of:

- woodwinds: three flutes (2. also piccolo, 3. also piccolo and alto flute); three oboes (3. also English horn); three B♭-clarinets (1. also A clarinet, 2. also E-flat clarinet and bass clarinet, 3. also bass clarinet and double bass clarinet); two bassoons (2. also contrabassoon)
- brass section: four horns in F, three trumpets in C, two tenor trombones, bass trombone, tuba
- timpani (also big drum, big hanging cymbal, China cymbal, tuned gong in F sharp)
- percussion (four players):
  - vibraphone
  - aluphone
  - marimba
  - tubular bells
  - crotales
  - tuned gongs (one octave Turandot gongs and low B and C sharp)
  - China basin
  - Sizzle basin
  - Ride basin
  - two hanging basins (large and small)
  - thunderpanel
  - snare drum (preferably piccolo snare)
  - temple blocks (high, medium, low)
  - tambourine
  - pu`ʻli (split bamboo sticks)
  - little triangle
  - egg shaker (for the effect of a ticking wristwatch)
  - deep wood block
  - wood birds
  - rattle
  - finger cymbal
  - flexatone
  - two large drums (1 with snare effect by double bass strings glued to the underside)
  - two tamtams (large and small)
  - wind machine
- sound effects (samples), piano, celesta (also MIDI keyboard), harp
- strings: twelve first violins, ten second violins, eight violas, eight cellos, six double basses
