= Sharon Pollock =

Canadian actor and writer (1936–2021)

- Born: Mary Sharon Chalmers; 19 April 1936; Fredericton, New Brunswick
- Died: 22 April 2021 (aged 85); Calgary, Alberta
- Occupations: Writer, director, actress, playwright
- Children: 6
- Writing career
- Notable works: Blood Relations (1980), Doc (1984)

Sharon Pollock, OC FRSC (19 April 1936 – 22 April 2021) was a Canadian playwright, actor, and director. She was Artistic Director of Theatre Calgary (1984), Theatre New Brunswick (1988–1990) and Performance Kitchen & The Garry Theatre, the latter which she herself founded in 1992. In 2007, she was made a Fellow of the Royal Society of Canada. Pollock was one of Canada's most notable playwrights, and was a major part of the development of what is known today as Canadian Theatre.

== Early years ==
Mary Sharon Chalmers was born in Fredericton, New Brunswick, on 19 April 1936, to Eloise and George Everett Chalmers. Her mother had been a nurse prior to marrying her father, a prominent local physician and political figure. Sharon was raised in a family and time when appearances and family ties were extremely important; although her mother knew her father was unfaithful to her, she refused to leave him. Sharon had a younger brother, Peter Chalmers, who was born 19 October 1937. When Sharon was younger her parents often took her and her brother on trips, including to Banff, Vancouver, and through the U.S. She had exposure to large scale American musical theatre as the family traveled to New York, where she saw popular musicals such as Annie Get Your Gun, South Pacific, and Oklahoma!

As a child, Pollock was not very interested in academics, but enjoyed reading, and at a young age developed a passion for history. She attended Charlotte Street Primary School and, for grades 9 and 10, Fredericton High School, where she was the president of the Drama Club. When she was in grade ten, she and a friend skipped school for three weeks straight to sneak into the local cinema and watch movies. When they were caught, Pollock's father sent her to King's Hall (Now Bishop's College School), an Anglican private school, because he believed that if she could skip school for three weeks and still get good grades, then there was no way her schooling was challenging enough. At this young age Pollock and the same friend, Jane Hickman, created "The Secret Two Club", for they both shared the desire to be writers, instead of housewives or teachers like the women around them. As well as her interest in drama and writing, Pollock was actively involved in the sports teams at King's Hall and was editor of the school magazine.

In Pollock's later teenage years her family began to fall apart. Her mother felt stifled in the role of housewife and was worn down by her husband's constant unfaithfulness. Eloise Chalmers committed suicide in 1954, when Pollock was 18. The same year, Pollock enrolled in the general arts program at the University of New Brunswick (UNB), where she was also an active member of the Drama Society. She met her future husband, Ross Pollock, at UNB where he was in his fifth year of the environmental forestry program.

The young couple eloped, and by 1956 they had their first child, Jennifer. In the same year they moved to Toronto, where they lived for the next eight years. During this time, the couple had four more children, Kirk (1957), Melinda (1959), Lisa (1961) and Michele (1963).

Pollock joined a theatre group in Toronto, directing a handful of high school kids (1962–63). She referred to this directing stint as "the blind leading the blind".

Ross openly abused his wife; Pollock admits attempting to kill him by grinding up high hormone level birth control pills and putting the powder into his food. This attempt at murder was unsuccessful. In 1964, after another violent physical attack by her husband, Pollock left Ross and returned to Fredericton with her five children. She hoped to be with her family, but it was not as she had left it. Her father had remarried and had two more children with his new wife.

== Life in the theatre ==
Pollock's career in theatre began in 1964. When she returned to Fredericton, she arrived just in time for the new Beaverbrook Playhouse to open. She found a job running the Playhouse Box Office. At the Playhouse, she, along with some of the members from the UNB Drama Society, formed "The Company of Ten", which performed six shows in the 1964–65 season, then dissolved the following year. During this time Pollock began dating fellow actor Michael Ball.

Victor Mitchell had been starting up a Drama Department at the University of Calgary and offered Ball a position starting in January 1966.

Pollock followed Ball west, hoping that this move across Canada would allow her and her children the opportunity to start fresh, to leave the emotional baggage of her family behind her.

The 1960s were a booming time in Canadian theatre. There were regional theatres and festivals popping up all over the country. After their move to Calgary, Pollock and Ball began touring with Mitchell's theatre group The Prairie Players. They traveled around small towns in Alberta performing in any space they could find. If they were lucky, the troupe earned $35 a week. Shortly after, in 1967, Pollock joined the MAC 14 Theatre Society, which was the merge of The Musicians and Actors Club of Calgary and a theatre group called Workshop 14. The MAC 14 club was the founding company of Theatre Calgary.

In this same year, Pollock's sixth child, Amanda, was born to Pollock and Ball. The 60s and early 70s were not easy for Pollock and her family. They lived in barely acceptable living conditions, on an extremely scarce income.

In about 1967–68 Pollock began writing plays. After having the opportunity to experience life as an actress, she wanted to see what it was like to be on the writing and production side of theatre. Her main motivation to write instead of perform was the lack of Canadian playwrights. In expressing her determination to write Canadian plays, she says, "I wanted other actors to stand up and say my words, to speak directly through an experience I shared with those other Albertans and Canadians." Pollock was becoming frustrated with how even as an actor she rarely felt her voice was heard. She was tired of reproducing others' work and longed to hear a Canadian voice on stage. The way theatre was in those days, she felt that no one even wanted to hear a Canadian voice, or a Canadian story. Pollock's first work was Split Seconds in the Death of, a radio play that was broadcast on CBC on 22 November 1970. These were the days of radio, when a radio play drew a bigger audience than a theatre did. Already in this first script Pollock is pushing the boundaries of the realist narrative. She followed this with two other Radioplays, 31 for 2 and We to the Gods both in 1971, all for CBC Radio.

== Career as a playwright ==
In 1971, Pollock wrote her first full-length play, A Compulsory Option, a dark comedy about three men whose paranoia might be realistic. It premiered in 1972 and was the first production by Vancouver's New Play Centre. It won an Alberta Culture playwriting competition. In November 1973 Pollock premiered her second full-length play Walsh at Theatre Calgary. In this play she dramatizes one of the most disturbing events in Canadian history, that of the injustices done to the Sioux Nation in 1877–1881. In Walsh, The Komagata Maru Incident and One Tiger to a Hill, Pollock examines historic events and tells them in a way that causes the audience to question the reality between the official story and what is shown on stage.

Throughout her career Pollock continued to use history, that of Canada, such as in Whiskey Six Cadenza (1983), Fair Liberty's Call (1993), or End Dream (2000); as well as her own personal history in plays such as Generations (1980), or Doc (1984) as fuel for her plays.

Blood Relations (1980) is one of Pollock's most well known and influential plays. It premiered at Theatre Three in Edmonton on 12 March 1980. Originally written as My Name Is Lisbeth which premiered at Douglas College, Blood Relations is the story of Lizzie Borden, based on historical facts. Borden supposedly murdered her father and stepmother. Pollock explores the meaning of the effect that it would have on the community if Lizzie Borden was in fact a murderer. While the play does touch on feminist issues, Pollock was criticized for making it less of a feminist play and more of a general political play.

Throughout Pollock's playwright career, her strong opinions about Canadian theatre motivated her to create a theatre of her own. She hoped to create a place for artistic talent to flourish and provide diversity. She wanted the Garry Theatre to be 'created by artists for artists.'

The Garry Theatre opened in 1995 in the lower income area of Calgary. Pollock was so passionate about theatre that she was adamant that The Garry not pay her royalties. She wanted people from all walks of life to have the opportunity to experience theatre; if people could not afford tickets, they were still invited to view the plays. Prior to the opening of the Garry Theatre, Pollock worked as the artistic director at Theatre Calgary in 1984 and 1985 as well at Theatre New Brunswick in 1988. She left both of these jobs because of a difference of opinions. She strongly disagreed with the 'institutionalization' of the theatre and the direction it was heading.

Pollock later wrote for the Atlantic Ballet Company. In March 2011 she made her musical theatre debut with Calgary's Verb Theatre and their production of Ron Chambers' acclaimed play Marg Szkaluba (Pissy's Wife). In a four star review The Calgary Sun wrote, "...So controlled and carefully delineated is Pollock's performance that she truly does become this remarkable woman who languished far too long under the belief she was unintelligent, unattractive and undeserving."

== Awards ==
- Dominion Drama Festival Best Actress Award for The Knack (1966)
- Alberta Culture Playwriting Competition for A Compulsory Option (1971)
- Governor General's Award for Drama for Blood Relations (1981)
- Golden Sheaf Award for The Person's Case, Television (1981)
- Alberta Achievement Award (1983)
- Chalmers Canadian Play Award for Doc (1984)
- Governor General Award for Drama for Doc (1986)
- Canadian-Australian Literary Award (1987)
- Honorary degree, University of New Brunswick (1987)
- Japan Foundation Award (1995)
- Harry and Martha Cohen Award for contributions to Calgary Theatre (1999)
- Honorary degree, University of Calgary (2004)
- Fellow of the Royal Society of Canada (2007)

== Major works ==
- Split Seconds in the Death of (1970, CBC, radioplay)
- 31 for 2 (1971, CBC, radioplay)
- We to the Gods (1971, CBC, radioplay)
- A Compulsory Option (1972, New Play Centre)
- The B Triple P Plan (1972, CBC, radioplay)
- Walsh (1973, Theatre Calgary)
- The New Canadians (1973, Playhouse Holiday, TYA)
- Superstition Throu' the Ages (1973, Playhouse Holiday, TYA)
- Waiting (1973, CBC, radioplay)
- Wudjesday? (1973, Playhouse Holiday, TYA)
- The Larsens (1974, CBC, radioplay)
- A Lesson in Swizzelry (1974, 1975, Caravan Touring Troupe)
- Portrait of a Pig (1974, CBC, Television)
- And Out Goes You? (1975, Vancouver Playhouse)
- In Memory Of (1975, CBC, radioplay)
- The Komagata Maru Incident (1976, Vancouver Playhouse)
- The Komagata Maru Story (1976, CBC, radioplay)
- My Name is Lisbeth (original version of Blood Relations) (1976, Vancouver Playhouse)
- Ransom (1976, CBC, Television)
- Country Joy (1978, CBC, Six 30-min radioplay)
- Generation (1978, CBC, radioplay)
- Chantaqua Spelt E-N-E-R-G-Y (1979, Alberta Theatre Projects)
- Generation (1979, CBC, radioplay)
- Mail vs. Female (1979, Lunchbox Theatre)
- The Person's Case (1979, Access Television)
- Sweet Land of Liberty (1979, CBC, radioplay)
- One Tiger to a Hill (1980, Citadel Theatre)
- Generations (1980, Alberta Theatre Projects)
- Blood Relations (1980, Edmonton Theatre Three)
- Mary Beth Goes to Calgary (1980, CBC, radioplay)
- Mrs. Yale and Jennifer (1980, CBC, eight radioplays)
- Whiskey Six Cadenza (1983, Theatre Calgary)
- Intensive Care (1983, CBC, radioplay)
- Doc (1984, Theatre Calgary)
- Prairie Dragons (1987, Quest Theatre)
- Getting it Straight (1988, Women in the Arts Festival, Winnipeg Manitoba)
- It's All Make-Believe, Isn't it?-Marilyn Munroe (1991, ATP Brief New Works Festival)
- The Making of Warriors (1991, CBC, radioplay)
- Constance (1992, CBC, radioplay)
- Fair Liberty's Call (1993, Stratford Festival)
- Saucy Jack (1993, The Garry Theatre)
- Death in the Family (1993, The Garry Theatre)
- Moving Pictures (1999, Theatre Junction)
- End Dream (2000, Theatre Junction)
- Angel's Trumpet (2001, Theatre Junction)
- The Making of Warriors (2003, Co-operative Theatre)
- Man Out of Joint (2007, Downstage)
- Blow Wind High Water (2017, Theatre Calgary)

== See also ==
- List of Canadian playwrights
- List of writers from New Brunswick

== Sources ==
- Grace, Sherrill (2008). Making theatre : a life of Sharon Pollock. Talonbooks. ISBN 978-0-88922-586-2. OCLC 192053145.
