= Betty Mitchell (theatre director) =

Canadian theatre director

Betty Mitchel
- Born: Bessie Mitchel; May 4, 1896; Sandusky, Ohio, USA
- Died: September 10, 1976 (aged 80); Calgary, Alberta, Canada
- Education: University of Alberta; University of Iowa

Bessie "Betty" Mitchell (May 4, 1896 – September 10, 1976) was an American-born Canadian theatre director and educator.

She was born in Sandusky, Ohio, and came to Alberta with her mother, brother and sister when she was sixteen, settling on a farm near Oyen. She completed high school by correspondence. Mitchell went on to attend the normal school in Calgary and teach in rural schools. She studied botany at the University of Alberta, where she also first appeared in a drama production. She taught botany in Calgary schools for ten years. Mitchell also helped establish a number of theatre groups there: The Green Room Club in 1930, the Side Door Playhouse in 1932 and Workshop 14 in 1944. Workshop 14 merged with the Mac Theatre Society to form Theatre Calgary, a professional theatre group, in 1966. After the newly elected Social Credit provincial government incorporated fine arts into the high school curriculum, Mitchell became a high school drama teacher. She was director of drama at Western Canada High School from 1936 to 1961. She was also a director at the Studio Theatre of the University of Alberta. From 1955 to 1960, she was a judge at the Dominion Drama Festival.

After Professor Barclay Leathem attended a special presentation of Our Town at Western Canada High School, he recommended Mitchell for a Rockefeller Foundation Fellowship. She went on to earn an MA in theatre at the State University of Iowa. A National Research Fellowship from the Cleveland Play House allowed her to visit and study theatre groups in the United States.

She died in Calgary at the age of 80.

The Betty Mitchell Awards or Bettys were established in 1998 to recognize the best in Calgary theatre. A theatre at the Allied Arts Centre in Calgary and the Betty Mitchell Theatre at the Southern Alberta Jubilee Auditorium were also named in her honour.
