= Hodges Point Breakwater =

Structure in New Brunswick, Canada

The Hodges Point Breakwater, formerly known as the Negro Point Breakwater, is a historic breakwater structure located in Saint John, New Brunswick, Canada. It extends from Hodges Point on the mainland's west side of the Saint John Harbour to Partridge Island, connecting the two. Originally named after a geographical feature with a derogatory term, it was renamed in 2017 to honor Frederick Douglas Hodges, a local Black Canadian labour leader and civil rights activist. The structure is not open to the public, and crossing it is illegal due to safety concerns and environmental contamination on Partridge Island.
