= Live Design =

Lighting trade magazine

Logo

Live Design is a monthly digital trade magazine, owned by Questex, that covers the latest projects and gear in live entertainment, including theatre, film, concerts, opera, ballet, architainment, and more. Columbia College Chicago's Theatre Department cites it for providing "comprehensive coverage for professionals in the fields of lighting, sound, staging, and projection." It originated as Lighting Dimensions, which combined with Theatre Crafts and Entertainment Design (1999-2005). Until December 2013, it was a print magazine, but has since converted to a free app with monthly issues for Apple and Android devices. Live Design is geared towards aspiring and established designers in the disciplines of lighting, audio, projection, and scenery. The magazine also manages its own website. Live Design is affiliated with the LDI trade show, and hosts the Live Design Master Classes and Envision Symposium. In his undergraduate textbook on stage management, Lawrence Stern recommends subscribing to the magazine and attending LDI as way for professional stage managers to keep current on theater technology. Live Design also presents awards and scholarships to younger designers, including the Pat MacKay Diversity In Design Scholarships for undergraduates and the Rising Star Award to early career professional designers.

== History ==
In March 1967, the first issue of Theatre Crafts was published by Emmaus, PA-based Rodale Press, which was owned by J. I. Rodale. Marshall Ackerman was Theatre Crafts’ first publisher. The magazine focused on news of theatre design and its technology. Theatre Crafts began with a free circulation to high school and college drama instructors. Geared towards the offstage performers, the magazine featured “how-to” articles from theatre designers of costumes, lighting, sets, and more.

In 1969, C. Ray Smith became the editor for Theatre Crafts and shaped it into a more professional magazine for the theatre industry. In January 1970, Patricia MacKay joined the editors. Theatre Crafts grew from strictly theatre, to covering film, concerts, theme parks, retail shops, television, opera, and architecture.

In June 1977, Theatre Crafts’ sister publication, Lighting Dimensions released its first issue. The magazine focused on lighting and design in concerts, theatre, film, and architecture.

Patricia MacKay bought Theatre Crafts from Rodale Publishing in 1982. Theatre Crafts then acquired Lighting Dimensions in February 1986.

MacKay organized a trade show for the entertainment industry called LDI. It made its debut in Dallas, Texas in 1988 with over a hundred exhibitors and 3,000 attendees. It has run each year ever since.

On its 25th anniversary in 1992, Theatre Crafts became TCI (Theatre Crafts International) to include international coverage, and also redesigned to tablet size.

In January 1996, Intertec Publishing of Overland Park, KS, which eventually became Penton after numerous transitions, acquired TCI, Lighting Dimensions, and LDI.

Eventually, TCI became Entertainment Design. Entertainment Design and Lighting Dimensions were merged into Live Design in December 2005.

Live Design closed its print publication and converted to a digital, interactive app and magazine for Apple products in December 2013, and implemented an Android version in October 2014.

In late 2019, Questex purchased Live Design from Informa plc.

== LDI ==
LDI is an annual trade show for live event professionals, which debuted in Dallas, Texas in 1988 with over a hundred exhibitors and 3,000 attendees. It has been to various locations from Nashville, Tennessee to Orlando and Miami, FL, to Reno, Lake Tahoe, and Las Vegas, Nevada.

Since then, LDI has continued to grow, receiving over 9,700 attendees, working in theatre, concerts, houses of worship, corporate presentations, clubs, theme parks, and any other live venue, from 88 countries. Over 350 companies exhibit and provide live demos and gear showcases. The trade show is concerned with lighting, sound, projection, staging and truss, and special effects.

== Live Design Master Classes ==
Live Design’s master classes feature top designers from their respective disciplines. The Broadway Master Classes (BMC) originated as Broadway Lighting Master Classes (BLMC), run by Sonny Sonnenfeld, who started it with nine-time Tony Award-winning lighting designer, Jules Fisher. Live Design purchased the BLMC from Sonnenfeld and expanded into Broadway Projection Master Classes (BPMC) and Broadway Sound Master Classes (BSMC). Hosted in New York, BMC is geared towards both students and professionals. Fisher and sound designer, Abe Jacob have been the creative consultants for the BLMC and BSMC, respectively, since their inception. In February 2015, Live Design announced it was rebranding the Broadway Master Classes as the New York Master Classes (NYMC). This training series expands the curriculum to include all aspects of lighting, projection, and sound design in not only theater, but also concerts, dance, and opera.

The Concert Master Classes (CMC) focus on lighting and projection for concerts.

The Projection Master Classes (PMC) focus on the technical and creative obstacles in programming and projection mapping. It is concerned with gear such as playback software, surfaces, projectors, and networking.

The Electronic Dance Music Master Classes (EDMMC): Lighting + Projection focus on the aesthetic and technical components of designing and programming for EDM. EDMMC Sound focuses on the technical and practical considerations in designing sound for festivals and clubs.

== Envision Symposium ==
Envision Symposium was held in Monterey, California in September 2013. The conference sought to explore the idea of storytelling and how it is presented and transformed in today’s world of technology and design. It considered the future of various areas, such as, concerts, theme parks, gaming, and digital environments. The conference was geared towards an expansive creative audience, including designers, writers, artists, technicians, engineers, programmers, manufacturers, distributors, and inventors. Bran Ferren and Bob Bonniol were the creative consultants.
