= William O. Raymond =

Canadian clergyman and historian (1853–1923)

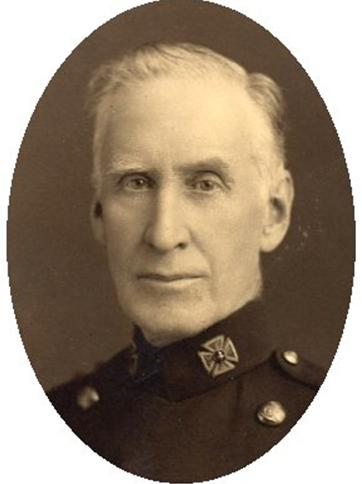
- Born: February 3, 1853; Lower Woodstock, New Brunswick, Canada
- Died: November 24, 1923 (aged 70); Toronto, Ontario, Canada
- Education: University of New Brunswick
- Occupation: Rector
- Spouse: Julia Nelson

William Odber Raymond (February 3, 1853 – November 24, 1923) was a Canadian clergyman and historian from New Brunswick. While serving as a rector in Saint John, he contributed towards writing and editing historical works of Loyalist settlement in New Brunswick, having spent several years contributing for and serving as the president of the New Brunswick Historical Society. His 1905 writing Glimpses of the Past: History of the River St. John contains a record of what is likely to be the first known Black individual in what is now New Brunswick.

== Life and career ==
Raymond was born on February 3, 1853, in Lower Woodstock, New Brunswick, to parents Charles William Raymond and Elizabeth Mary Carman. He attended the University of New Brunswick after receiving the Carleton County scholarship, and received a BA degree in mathematics and natural science in 1876. Afterwards, he studied theology under Bishop John Medley, was ordained as a deacon in 1877 and as a priest the following year. He ministered in Stanley Parish, York County for the next six years, where he married Julia Nelson, later having two children together.

In 1884, Raymond became rector of St. Mary's Church in Saint John, during which he became the archdeacon of Saint John in 1908. Alongside his clerical work, Raymond contributed heavily towards historical writings. Over nearly 20 years, he contributed towards the New Brunswick Historical Society, additionally serving as its president for multiple years. Raymond also made heavy contributions towards editing the Winslow Papers, a significant record of Loyalist settlement in New Brunswick.

He wrote the 1905 Glimpses of the Past: History of the River St. John, documenting the history of the Saint John River. Additionally, it contains likely the first known record of a Black individual in what is now New Brunswick, who, described by Raymond as "probably the first of his race to set foot within the borders of New Brunswick," had been forcibly taken from the New England Colonies to Fort Nashwaak by the French before being taken back during a New England-led attack. In 1910, Raymond issued a revised version.

== Later life and death ==
In 1916, Raymond retired from his position as a rector due to his declining health. He and his family moved to Toronto after having previously moved to Michigan and Vancouver, where he gave a lecture in the Vancouver Institute. On November 24, 1923, Raymond died in Toronto.
