= Anna Minerva Henderson =

Canadian poet

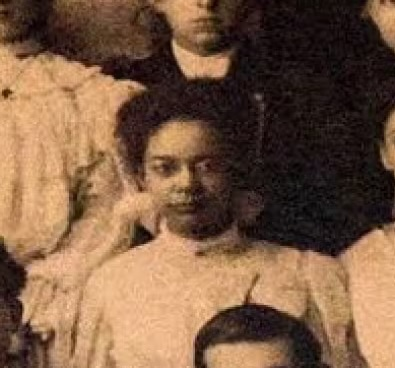
- Henderson in a 1905 class photo at Saint John High School
- Born: August 8, 1887 Saint John, New Brunswick
- Died: August 1987 (aged 99–100) Saint John, New Brunswick
- Resting place: Fernhill Cemetery
- Occupation: teacher, stenographer, principal clerk, poet
- Citizenship: Canadian
- Notable works: "Parliament Hill, Ottawa" (sonnet, 1937), Citadel (chapbook, 1967)

Anna Minerva Henderson (August 8, 1887 – 1987) was a teacher, civil servant, and poet from Saint John, New Brunswick. According to the New Brunswick Black History Society, during Canada's centennial in 1967 she published a "chaplet" containing 22 poems which is believed to be the first book to be published by a Black woman who was born in Canada. In 2004, Henderson and New Brunswick publisher Abraham Beverley Walker were the subject of the 2004 W. Stewart MacNutt Memorial Lecture at the University of New Brunswick by George Elliot Clarke who at the time was serving as the Poet Laureate of Toronto. In 2006, Clarke published "Anna Minerva Henderson: An Afro-New Brunswick Response to Canadian (Modernist) Poetry" in the journal Canadian Literature, based upon this lecture.

== Early life and career ==
Anna Minerva Henderson was born on August 8, 1887, in Saint John, New Brunswick, to Henrietta Leek, a schoolteacher, and William Robert Henderson, an African American soldier and barber who died in a horsecar accident in 1893. Anna graduated from Saint John High School in 1905. She earned her teacher's certificate, but was barred from teaching in Halifax or Saint John on account of her race. She taught in Black communities in Nova Scotia for two years. She was hired by the Civil Service of Canada in 1912 after receiving the third highest grade in the Dominion of Canada on the entrance test. She worked for the Department of the Interior's Dominion Lands Branch as a stenographer. In 1938, she worked for the Department of Mines and Resources' immigration branch, employed as principal clerk. Henderson worked as a stenographer for the Saint John law firm Fairweather & Stevenson in 1945.

Henderson wrote "The Colymn" an Ottawa Citizen column and was published in magazines by the 1930s. Canadian Poetry Magazine published her sonnet "Parliament Hill, Ottawa" in 1937. She self-published her 31-page chapbook Citadel in 1967. She took a creative writing course from the University of New Brunswick in 1974.

== Death and legacy ==
Henderson died in 1987 and was interred at Fernhill Cemetery on July 21, 1987.

In 2021, as part of their Being Black in Canada feature the CBC produced an article focused on Hendersen titled "Restoring the legacy of a 'trailblazing' Black Saint John writer" that focused on Hendersen's life as an educator, civil servant and author, and on the research currently underway to further explore and promote her legacy as an African-Canadian author.
