= Architainment =

Combination of architecture and entertainment

Architainment is a portmanteau of the words architecture and entertainment. It is generally associated lighting or LEDs, and describes a process in which an inanimate material object as distinct from a living sentient being is apposed an entertaining element via light, media, kinetic or other medium; thus giving it a dual purpose.

Recent technologies and art field such as colour changing LED lighting or motion detection or kinetic art have increased the visibility and versatility potential and brought this new discipline into life.

Some examples of architainment:

The fully automated Sky Symphony installation of 1001 Kinetic LED Winches in Genting Highlands. The free-to-public performance showcases an orchestra of lighting, kinetic, music and motion graphics programming. The installation's permanent access to a public audience allowed companies such as Netflix and DC Entertainment to conduct large scale marketing campaigns using the display.

The Empire state building has recently been fitted with colour changing LED fixtures that change the building lighting at will. During Festive season the lighting is themed to match the colour scheme and sometimes synchronized to music played on local radio.

Another example can be seen at the Sydney opera house where dynamic lighting has given the opera house a new life.

Architainment can be seen in Finland in an installation called Valokaivo, where light and motion sensors are serving a dual purpose.
