= William Martin Leggett =

Canadian and Australian poet and journalist (1805–1878)

William Martin Leggett (15 December 1808 – 25 April 1878), also known as William Montague Clarence Campbell, was a Canadian and Australian poet and journalist, author of The Forest Wreath.

== Early life ==
Born on 15 December 1808, probably in the Bowery district of the city of New York, William Martin Leggett grew up amid the forests and farms of Sussex Vale on the Kennebecasis River, New Brunswick, British North America. His parents – Joseph Regan Leggett and Mary (née Martin) – both teachers, took charge of the so-called Indian Academy there, later establishing a school at their home Lansdale Cottage. Both had their verse published in provincial newspapers, and William's maternal aunt Rachel Martin was also a teacher and poet.

William was educated by his parents. His own verse began appearing as early as 1827 and when his anthology The Forest Wreath was published in 1833 he was hailed as a prodigy. He followed his parents into teaching but in 1835 turned from his Anglican upbringing to become a missionary in the Wesleyan Church, serving at posts in Nova Scotia, New Brunswick, and the island of Montserrat, West Indies, where he witnessed the devastating earthquake of 8 February 1843. In 1839, at Bathurst, New Brunswick, William married Mary Ann Stevens, the daughter of devout Wesleyans. They had three children, only one of whom survived infancy. William's second volume of verse, Sacred Poetry By a Wesleyan Minister, appeared in 1840. In 1845, he left for England to pursue a career in letters, at which point he disappears from Canadian records.

== Career in Australia ==
In England he adopted a new identity, joining the British Army under the name William Alonzo Campbell, and in 1848 was shipped to Sydney, New South Wales, as part of a convict guard. During the voyage he dedicated an ode to a fellow passenger, the pioneer photographer George Cherry, signing himself "a Knight Templar, XIth Foot (late the Bard of New Brunswick)". William's life in New South Wales was peripatetic and varied: teacher at remote country schools, journalist, gold-digger, manager of a sheep and cattle run on the remote Castlereagh River, soup kitchen attendant in the slums of Sydney, police spy and settler.

On 13 January 1851, at the Scotch Church in Bowenfels, New South Wales, William married again, this time to Charlotte Crawford, schoolteacher and governess, who had arrived in Sydney in 1849 as matron to a shipload of Irish Famine orphan girls. In the absence of any New Brunswick divorce record, it seems likely that this marriage was bigamous.

The family lived in genteel poverty, battling for food and shelter. At Bathurst, New South Wales, William wrote verse epics and reminiscences of New Brunswick for the Free Press newspaper as "William M. Leggett, M.A." and in Sydney he wrote newspaper verse as "A Knight Templar XIth Foot". By the early 1850s he had styled himself William Montague Clarence Campbell and by that name (or variants) he was known for the rest of his days, but for literary purposes he favoured pseudonyms. In Henry Parkes' Sydney-based Empire newspaper he advocated constitutional reform and Australian independence as "Alonzo". He wrote whimsical scraps for the Times of Singleton, New South Wales, as the "Man of the Caves, O.N.P." ("One of Nature's Peers") from his hermitage in the nearby Wombo (or Wambo) Mountains, and acted as the paper's Muswellbrook correspondent. Back in Sydney in 1864 he established the Woollahra Academy – grand in name only – and as "The Woollahra Hermit" wrote verse and essays for the Illustrated Sydney News. There too he advertised a threepenny weekly, the Woollahra Hermit's Own, and embarked on his never-published epic poem "Individuality; or, a Historical Sketch of the Mind of an Honest Man, struggling to surmount Religious, Political and Literary Obstacles".

In the anti-Irish hysteria following Henry James O'Farrell's attempt on the life of royal visitor Prince Alfred at Clontarf, Sydney, in 1868, William was recruited by the Parkes government to spy on supposed Fenians in the streets and pubs of Glebe, after which he contributed verse and stories to the virulently anti-Catholic Australian Protestant Banner as Campbell, "W.M.C.C." and "Clarence" of the "Theological Observatory".

Towards the end of 1868 William was given charge of the government school at Eurobodalla, on the south coast of New South Wales, arriving there a few months after the death of poet Charles Harpur. He penned nature verse like "A Night-Visit to the Oaks at Eurobodalla", and an ode over Harpur's grave on the hill at Euroma. He sent graphic accounts to the Sydney papers describing the floods on the Tuross River, relating how he and his son had fought through the waters to the assistance of Harpur's widow Mary.

Then in 1870, at Runnymede (now called Runnyford) on the banks of the Buckenbowra River inland from Batemans Bay, William set up a provisional school and, with the aid of sons Rodolph (born 1854) and Alpheus (born 1858), hacked a farm out of the tall timber up the river. He called the place Lordsland. He continued to send verse to newspapers, corresponded with pioneer geologist William Branwhite Clarke, and sent cranky letters to The Australian Freemason on what he took to be the godless science of Thomas Huxley.

== Royal claims ==
William died at Lordsland on 25 April 1878, aged 70, and is probably buried on his property. His death certificate records his father as George IV, King of England and his mother as Lady Mary Campbell. William's claim to royal blood was not new. In 1868, he had tried to persuade Parkes that he was the son of the Duke of Clarence (the future William IV), adopted under royal instruction by Sir Archibald Campbell, Lieutenant-Governor of New Brunswick. Other, less spectacular claims – an M.A. from the University of Cambridge, membership of the Dragoon Guards, secretaryship to the Governor General of Canada, a stipendiary magistracy in the West Indies – are not borne out. And the claim in some Canadian sources that he took holy orders in the Anglican Church before he left New Brunswick is contradicted in his own later correspondence.

== Poetry ==
- The Forest Wreath, St. John, N.B.: Durant and Sancton, 1833, via Internet Archive.
- Sacred Poetry. By a Wesleyan Minister, Fredericton, N.B.: Printed at the Sentinel Office, 1840.

== Selected individual works ==
- The Harp of New Brunswick
- Memory
- Fragment
- The Minstrel to His Shadow
- To the Lady of Lansdale
- Fragment
- Freemasonry (by The Rev. Brother W. M. Leggett, M.A.)
- Ode to Free Masonry (by A Knight Templar, XIth Foot)
- British America v. Australia (by Alonzo)
- Lines Suggested by the Advice of a Friend to "Take Things Easy" (by Alonzo)
- Stanzas. From an Unpublished Work, by W. M. Leggett, M.A.
- Reminiscences of a Traveller by William M. Leggett, M. A. - British America. No. III
- Melody. Inscribed to the Lady of Lansdale. By William M. Leggett, M. A.
- Scenes in the Ancient Terra Incognita, Since Converted into the Province of New Brunswick, British America: or Sketches of Indian Life. By William M. Leggett, M. A.
- A Miner's Dirge, by W. A. M. C. Campbell
- The Soul of Education. An Essay. From the Prose Pen of the Woollahra Hermit
- Mammon. By the Woollahra Hermit
- What Am I? By the Woollahra Hermit
- Individuality; or, a Historical Sketch of the Mind of an Honest Man, struggling to surmount Religious, Political and Literary Obstacles – Literary Prospectus
- Another and More Destructive Flood at Eurobodalla (by W. M. C. C.)

== Sources ==
- "W. M. Leggett: (author/organisation)". AustLit: Discover Australian Stories. University of Queensland. Material was copied from this source, which is available under a Creative Commons Attribution-ShareAlike 3.0 Unported license and the GNU Free Documentation License.
- Provincial Archives of New Brunswick (PANB).
- University of London School of Oriental and African Studies (SOAS).
- NSW Registry of Births Deaths & Marriages – Deaths (NSW BDM Deaths).
- New South Wales State Archives (NSWSA).
- State Library of New South Wales (SLNSW).
- The Daily Sun, Saint John, N.B., 11 April 1885; and 23 April 1894, via Daniel F. Johnson's New Brunswick Newspaper Vital Statistics, PANB.
- MacFarlane, W. G., New Brunswick Bibliography. The Books and Writers of the Province, Saint John, N.B.: Sun Printing Company, 1895, 51–2, via Internet Archive.
- Aiton, Grace, "Strange William Martin Leggett, New Brunswick's Gloomiest Bard", The Maritime Advocate and Busy East, 46:6, February 1956, 13–18.
- LaVorgna, Koral (2009), "William M. Leggett" at New Brunswick Literary Encyclopedia.
- LaVorgna, Koral (2016), "Lessons in Mid-Nineteenth Century New Brunswick Teacher Careerism", PhD Dissertation, University of New Brunswick, via UNB Libraries Scholar Research Repository.
- Vening, Chris, "William Martin Leggett: The 'Bard of New Brunswick' in Australia", Script & Print: Bulletin of the Bibliographic Society of Australia and New Zealand, 40:4, 2016, 199–221, ; includes select bibliography.
- Woodhams, Denis, and Michael D'Arcy, "Buckenboura's Royal Blood–William Montague Clarence Campbell", Journal of the Moruya and District Historical Society, June 1999, 8-9; September 1999, 8-9; December 1999, 8-9; and March 2000, 8-9.
