= Troy Parfitt =

Canadian author and traveler (born 1972)

- Born: January 7, 1972 (age 54)
- Education: U. New Brunswick
- Years active: Travel writer, English teacher
- Notable work: Notes from the Other China
- Parent: Foster Parfitt

Troy Parfitt is a Canadian author and traveler who focuses on critical travel commentary and cultural exposes. He grew up in New Brunswick, Canada, but has lived in Taiwan and Korea and has taught English as a second language in East Asia for twelve years. He wrote two books, called Notes From The Other China and Why China Will Never Rule the World.

== Reviews ==
Reviewer Bradley Winterton in the Taipei Times, reviewing his first book, described Parfitt as a "bad traveler, an insensitive loud-mouth ranting on about the absurdities of life 'abroad'". Reviewer John Burroughs described it as "travel commentary and cultural analysis." Reviewer Alan Caruba in the Canada Free Press described Parfitt as his "own man" with an "eye for detail and a talent for describing his journey in ways that do not ignore some obvious and ugly truths about the real China." Reviewer Terence P. Ward of AllBooks Review wrote that Parfitt is "fluent in Mandarin" and "brings a lot of information to the table" to back up his claims about China being filthy, overcrowded, with unimaginable poverty, and "pollution so thick that it obscures the sun". According to Ward, Parfitt argues that "China is romanticized, and cannot possibly ever rule the world because its population is willfully ignorant, poorly educated, and clueless about the world beyond that nation's borders." Vancouver Sun reviewer Jonathan Manthorpe agreed with Parfitt's conclusion that "China is unlikely to be an influential superpower because its current regime has no vision, its economy has developed no capacity for innovation, and there is no sense of optimism" as well as Parfitt's assessment that "China is a gloomy, bitter, xenophobic and ill-favoured place."
