= Marcel Mason =

Canadian blogger and political activist (born 1959)

Marcel Mason, known in the blogosphere as "Stageleft", (born June 15, 1959) is a Canadian blogger and political activist who runs the Stageleft:. Life on the left side political weblog.

== Biography ==
Born in Woodstock, New Brunswick, Mason joined the Hudson's Bay Company in August 1978 and moved to Eskimo Point (later renamed to the original Inuit place name of Arviat). He subsequently lived in Coral Harbour, Igloolik, Hall Beach, Chesterfield Inlet and Rankin Inlet, working with the Hudson's Bay Company. In 1982, he left the Hudson's Bay Company and worked in the social housing field in the eastern Arctic until 1992 when he entered the field of municipal politics. In 1994, he and his family relocated to Iqaluit, where he graduated with honours from the Nunavut Arctic College Management Studies Program.

In 1997, while working with Nunanet Communications, Mason set up the Eastern Arctic's first political discussion forum, "The Political Discussion Forum", as a result of dissatisfaction with how the Northwest Territories government located in the western Arctic city of Yellowknife addressed the concerns of people in the eastern region's territory. The discussion forum was very successful and quickly became the place for citizens to express and discuss their political concerns.

After leaving Nunavut for Ottawa, Ontario, in spring 2002, he unsuccessfully attempted to return to the bulletin board discussion scene with a political forum named !Gonk!. In January 2003, he set up the first incarnation of Stageleft:. Life on the left side on the free Blogspot hosting service. In March 2003, Stageleft (the blog) moved to a subdomain of crow.ws using the PMachine blogging software. Stageleft eventually moved to its current domain of stageleft.info.

Mason has been described as being politically left as a result of heavy criticism of George W. Bush, the American invasion of Iraq and modern Conservative political policies in general. This is an incorrect perception - he is an anarchist.

In 2004, Mason expanded Stageleft into a group blog, adding Terry Rudden ("Balbulican") as a co-blogger. In the 2005 Canadian Blog Awards, Stageleft received the first place award for "Best Group Blog", the second place award for "Best Progressive Blog" and the third place award for "Best Canadian Blog".

In the 2006 Canadian Blog Awards, Stageleft received the third place award for "Best Blog Series".

In the 2007 Canadian Blog Awards, Stageleft received first place for "Best Group Blog" and second place for "Best Progressive Blog".

In the 2008 Canadian Blog Awards, Stageleft was placed fifth in the "non-Partisan Blog" category.

Mason and Stageleft:. Life on the left side have been noticed by the Toronto Star blogger and columnist Antonia Zerbisias who wrote in one review, "You have to love stageleft.info for its outrage." Zerbisias also linked the Stageleft:. Life on the left side commentary on the Warren Kinsella "I Am Not Afraid" campaign after a foiled terrorist plot in Toronto, Ontario.
