= Neith (magazine) =

Canadian magazine

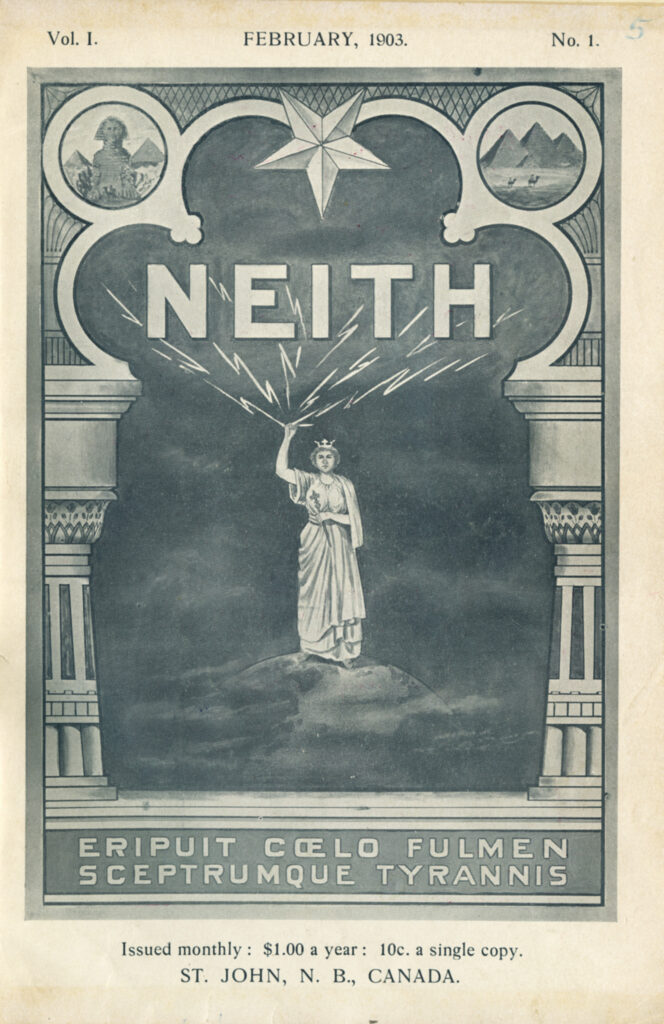
- The front page of the first issue of Neith
- Editor: Abraham Beverley Walker
- Frequency: Monthly
- First issue: February 1903
- Final issue: January 1904
- Country: Canada
- Based in: Saint John, New Brunswick
- Language: English

Neith: A Magazine of Literature, Science, Art, Philosophy, Jurisprudence, Criticism, History, Reform, Economics was one of the first Black Canadian literary magazines, founded, financed, and edited by Abraham Beverley Walker, the first Black Canadian-born lawyer, and published in Saint John, New Brunswick. It was launched in 1903 and lasted a total of five issues, with its 11-month run concluding in January 1904. It is considered to be the first Black Canadian-founded and managed literary magazine.

== Publication history ==
Neith was created by Abraham Beverley Walker, the first Black Canadian-born lawyer, and published in Saint John, New Brunswick. Throughout its 11-month run, Neith published five issues from February 1903 to January 1904, each being around 60 pages long. According to local historian Peter Little, the magazine's contributors included prominent figures like the attorney general and the lieutenant governor.

== Content ==
Neith covered a range of topics, namely: "literature, science, art, philosophy, jurisprudence, criticism, reform and economics." The articles also frequently championed racial equality and social justice.
