= Peter D. Clark (writer) =

Canadian writer

Peter D. Clark, sometimes dubbed The Apostle of New Brunswick, is a Canadian bestseller, storyteller, folklorist, and literacy ambassador. Clark has spent several decades collecting stories and folklore, particularly from the province of New Brunswick. His first book Woods, Streams, Ghosts and Hangin's was a Canadian bestseller and brought him to national attention.
