= Rideau Awards =

Canadian theatre awards

Prix Rideau Awards
- Awarded for: Best in Ottawa theatre
- Country: Canada
- Presented by: Prix Rideau Awards
- First award: 2007
- Website: www.prixrideauawards.ca

Les Prix Rideau Awards are theatre awards presented annually by the Rideau Awards committee, which honours the best in professional theatre in the region of Ottawa-Gatineau. The peer-juried awards program was initiated in 2006 as a result of discussion at an open meeting of the regional Canadian Actors’ Equity Association, with the first year for the distribution of the awards being in 2007.

In 2009, Les Prix Rideau Awards became fully bilingual, with a full slate of awards being presented for both English and French-language productions.

Performances are attended by teams of juries of local arts professionals (14 English, 8 French jurors in 2009). These juries nominate and vote on the productions by secret ballot with the results tallied by local impartial accountants. The secret ballot system was put in place to promote an honest assessment of the work and to avoid politics, making the awards as impartial as possible. The jurors vote with a first and second choice to negate the "first past the post" voting system.

For the calendar year 2009, 40 English and 11 French professional theatre productions were juried.

== Award Categories ==
At their inception, the awards consisted of 7 categories: Best Production, Best Director, Best Performance Male, Best Performance Female, Best Design, Best New Creation, and the Emerging Artist Award. Since then, they have expanded to be:

=== English theatre ===
- Outstanding Performance – Female
- Outstanding Performance – Male
- Outstanding Lighting Design
- Outstanding Set Design
- Outstanding Costume Design
- Outstanding Stage Management / Technical Award
- Outstanding Fringe Production
- Outstanding Director
- Emerging Artist Award
- Outstanding Adaptation
- Outstanding New Creation
- Outstanding Production

=== French theatre ===
- Interprétation féminine de l'année
- Interprétation masculine de l'année
- Conception de l'année
- Artiste en émergence
- Prix technique / de la regie
- Mise en scène de l'année
- Adaptation de l'année
- Nouvelle création de l'année
- Production de l'année
