= Mary Matilda Winslow =

Canadian academic

Mary Matilda (Tilly) Winslow was the first female Black Canadian to attend, starting in 1901, and graduate from the University of New Brunswick. She graduated with a BA in Classics in 1905, ranking at the top of her class.

She was born in Woodstock, New Brunswick in 1882. Unable to find employment in her home province, she moved to Nova Scotia and then immigrated to the United States (Birmingham, Alabama) where she met her future husband, Francis P. McAlpine, the editor and publisher of The Birmingham Free Speech newspaper, whom she married in Canada. She eventually became Dean of the Normal Department at the all-female Central College in Alabama.
