= Willow Grove, New Brunswick =

Human settlement in New Brunswick, Canada

Coordinates: 45°20′12″N 65°48′50″W

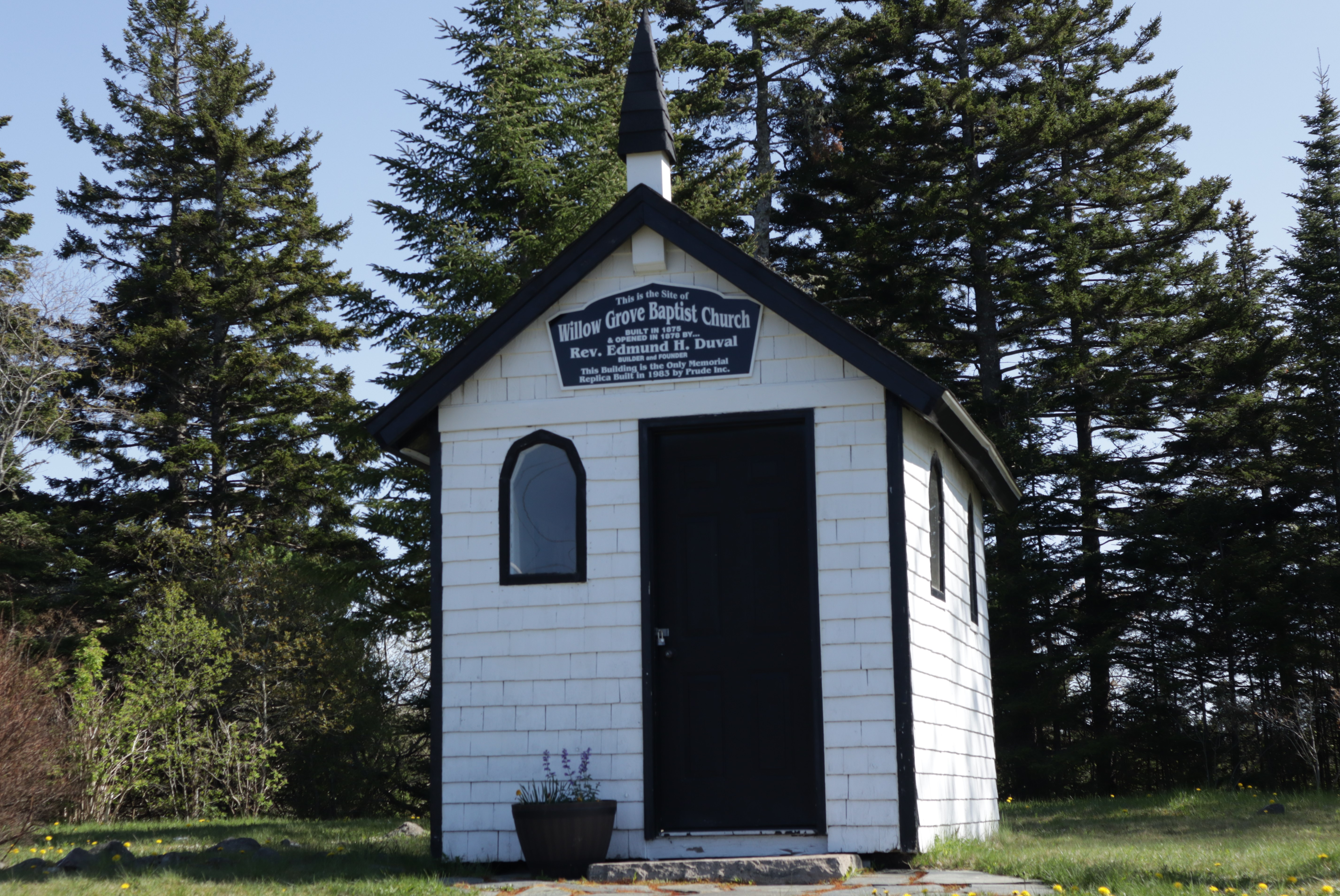
A memorial replica of the Willow Grove Baptist Church, located at the site of the Black Settlement Burial Ground.

Willow Grove is a settlement in New Brunswick, Canada, that was founded in 1815 or 1817 by Black refugees from the United States. It is located in Simonds Parish in Saint John County.

== History ==
The majority of residents of Willow Grove were freed American slaves who were granted freedom in exchange for fighting for the British in the War of 1812.

Alexander Cochrane, the commander in chief of the Royal Navy in North America stated in 1814 that "All those who may be disposed to emigrate from the United States will, with their families, be received on board of His Majesty's ships or vessels of war, or at the military posts that may be established, upon or near the coast of the United States." The Government of the United Kingdom's initial plans to provide land to Black loyalists was thwarted by the Government of Nova Scotia, who did not want more Black residents. The UK government next sought support from the Government of New Brunswick. New Brunswick Administrator Major General Stracey Smyth brought the matter to the Executive Council, and "Although the Council agreed by a vote of 3 to 2 to accept the refugees, the New Brunswick government was very reluctant to assume any responsibility for their welfare." Thousands of loyalists were accepted, of which 371 went to Willow Grove, having been promised fertile land for farming. The 50 acre plots given to the Black residents less than the 100 acre plots given to white arrivals from the US and the land in Willow Grove was not fertile.

Willow Grove is the location of the Black Settlement Burial Ground. Along with Amber Valley, Alberta, Willow Grove was featured on a Canadian postage stamp celebrating Black History Month in 2021.
