= Abraham Beverley Walker =

Canadian lawyer

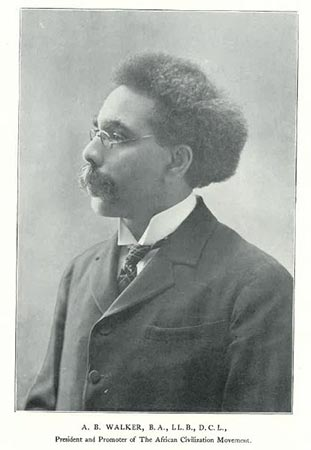

Abraham Beverley Walker ONB (23 August 1851 – 21 April 1909) was a New Brunswick-born lawyer and journalist. He was the first Canadian-born Black lawyer in New Brunswick, and the first black lawyer born in what is now Canada (Robert Sutherland having been born in Jamaica; when Walker was born, New Brunswick was part of British North America but Canada at the time only covered parts of modern Quebec and Ontario). He was posthumously awarded the Order of New Brunswick in 2019.

== Early life and education ==
Walker, who was of Loyalist ancestry, was a farmer's son in the Kingston peninsula area. His family had settled there in 1786, placing them in the first group of black settlers on the peninsula, which is upriver from Saint John. Walker grew up in a large family in the rural community of Kars and attended the one-room schoolhouse there. He learned shorthand at a school in Kingston, from Anglican Reverend William Elias Scovil.

Walker studied law at the National University Law School in Washington, DC, and later took law courses at Saint John Law School.

== Career ==
In 1882, Walker was called to the bar. He opened a law practice in Saint John after completing a three-year studentship at the office of lawyer George Godfrey Gilbert. After suffering numerous setbacks in his career as a lawyer and painful racial snubs at many levels, he was admitted as a solicitor to the Supreme Court of New Brunswick. In 1892, when the Saint John Law School opened, he was the first non-white student.

Walker was promised a Queen's and King's Counsel appointment several times, but racist objections prevented it. Despite this, he emerged as the leader of his racial group in the Maritimes and pursued work in civil rights. He lectured throughout North America in support of this cause. In 1903 and 1904, Walker published a magazine called Neith: A Magazine of Literature, Science, Art, Philosophy, Jurisprudence, Criticism, History, Reform, Economics , focusing on race issues, history, philosophy, literature, and art, making him the first black New Brunswick publisher.

In 2019, Walker was successfully nominated to receive the Order of New Brunswick "for his inspiring achievements as Canada's first black lawyer admitted to the bar and for his commitment to civil rights in New Brunswick and across North America."
