= Fred Hodges (politician) =

Canadian labour leader, activist, politician, and humanitarian

Fred Hodges CM
- Hodges in an undated photograph
- Born: Frederick Douglas Hodges; April 19, 1918; Saint John, New Brunswick
- Died: July 21, 1999 (aged 81); Digby, Nova Scotia
- Resting place: Field of Honour, Cedar Hill Extension Cemetery, West Saint John
- Occupations: Labour leader, politician, activist, humanitarian

Frederick Douglas Hodges CM (19 April 1918 - 21 July 1999) was a Canadian labour leader, civil rights activist, politician and humanitarian. Born in Saint John, New Brunswick, Hodges was the first visible minority elected in the Saint John City Council.

== Early life ==
Hodges was born in Saint John, New Brunswick, Canada to Lloyd Hodges and Drusilla Oliver - descendants of Black Loyalists who arrived in New Brunswick in the 1780s following the American Revolution. In the 1940s, Hodges worked as a freight handler with the Canadian Pacific Railway. During the Second World War, he served for two years in the Royal Canadian Airforce as a radio-telephone operator in Yarmouth, Nova Scotia, Canada.

== Career ==
Hodges maintained an active and long-running career in politics.

In 1946, Hodges returned to work as a freight handler for the CPR, who had a collective agreement with the Winterport Lodge 797 of the Brotherhood of Railway, Airline and Steamship Clerks, Freight Handlers, Express and Station Employees. Hodges became the first Black member of Lodge 747 when the union amended their constitution to permit memberships for Black workers in 1947. He maintained his membership for over 50 years. In the 1950s, Hodges lobbied for the Saint John District Labour Council to establish a standing committee on human rights, becoming its first chairman. In 1964, he became the first Black president of the Saint John District Labour Council, and served for 11 years.

In 1962, Hodges became a trustee within the New Brunswick Federation of Labour. In 1969, Hodges was elected the vice-president of the New Brunswick Federation of Labour for the counties of Saint John-Charlotte-Queens, serving for 6 years. Hodges was a founding member of the New Brunswick Association for the Advancement of Coloured People. He was also appointed to the New Brunswick Human Rights Commission.

In 1974, Hodges ran as an official labour candidate and became the first member of a visible minority to be elected as city councillor of Saint John.

Hodges' other memberships and roles included:

- a vice-chairman of the Saint John Port Industrial Commission
- Commissioner of the New Brunswick Human Rights Commission
- labour's representative on the New Brunswick Labour Relations Board
- vice-chairman of the Saint John Association to Abolish the Death Penalty
- vice-chairman of the Saint John Citizenship Association
- a director of the John Howard Society
- chairman of the Human Rights Awareness Association of Saint John
- chairman of the Civil Liberties Association—Saint John
- a director of the Civil Liberties Association of Canada
- a member of the Multicultural Association of Fredericton and Saint John
- a director of the College Development Committee UNBSJ
- an advisory board member to the New Brunswick Community College
- a member of the Planning Advisory Committee that created Market Square
- chairman and founding member of the first Saint John grocery Co-op
- co-chairman of the “Saint John Unity Committee,” which was created in the 1970s in an effort to promote the city.

Following Hodges' retirement in 1984, he maintained that labour movements or visible minorities were still not sufficiently accepted in Saint John, citing a lack of representation. Addressing the issue, Hodges stated that “the only way it will ever change is for these groups to keep united as a collective group and to make their voice known through the ballot box.”

== Awards ==
In 1978, Hodges received the Queen's Jubilee Medal.

On October 29, 1979, the New Brunswick Association for the Advancement of Coloured People hosted a testimonial dinner for Hodges in which over 350 people attended to honor him for his contributions to Saint John. While there, Hodges received a certificate of merit from the city of Saint John and a commendation from Premier Richard Hatfield.

In 1982, he received Canada's highest distinction, the Order of Canada for his work within labour, educational and municipal bodies, as well as his efforts "to further equal opportunities for minority groups."

In 1984, he was awarded an Honorary Doctor of Laws from the University of New Brunswick.

Hodges received the New Brunswick Human Rights Award from the New Brunswick Human Rights Commission for his "outstanding contributions to advance human rights."

== Personal life ==
Hodges married Olive Mildred Stewart in 1940 and had six children together. Olive died in 1965. In 1983, Hodges married Eugenia Simmons.

Upon being asked about his philosophy, Hodges stated: “accomplish what you can accomplish, then get a good night's sleep.”

Hodges died on July 21, 1999, en route to the hospital after suffering a heart attack while vacationing in Digby, Nova Scotia.
