= Theatre of Canada =

Canada's contemporary theatre

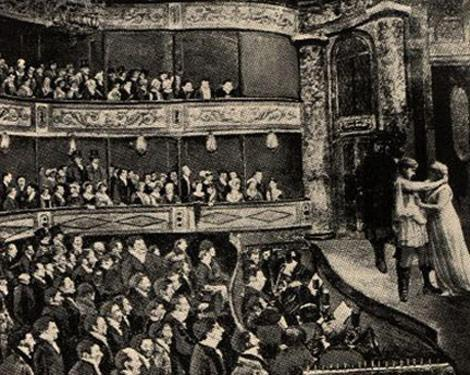
Theatre Royal, Montréal 1825

Canada's contemporary theatre reflects a diversity of regional and cultural identities. Since the late 1960s, there has been an effort to develop the voice of the 'Canadian playwright', which is reflected in the nationally focused programming of many of the country's theatres. Within this 'Canadian voice' are a plurality of perspectives - that of the First Nations, new immigrants, French Canadians, sexual minorities, etc. - and a multitude of theatre companies have been created to specifically service and support these voices.

== Early Canadian theatre ==
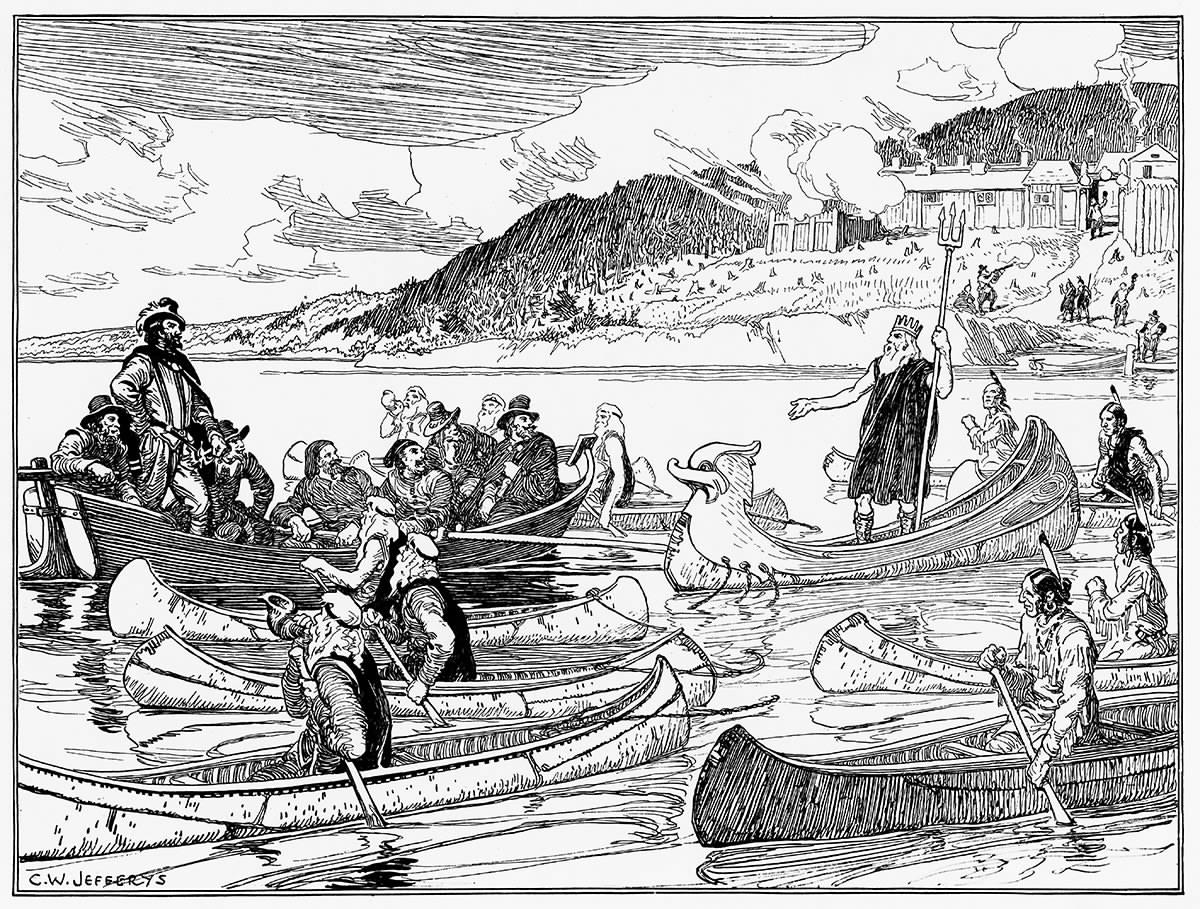
The play, Théâtre de Neptune, held in Port Royal basin, 1606.

The Annapolis Basin in Nova Scotia served as the cradle for both French and English language theatre in Canada. Théâtre de Neptune, performed in 1606, was the first European theatre production in North America.

The tradition of English theatre in Canada also started at Annapolis Royal. In Fort Anne, Nova Scotia, plays were produced for Prince of Wales' birthday. George Farquhar's The Recruiting Officer was produced on Saturday, 20 January 1733 to celebrate the birthday of Frederick, Prince of Wales. When he was a Lieutenant-Governor of Nova Scotia, Paul Mascarene translated Molière's French play The Misanthrope in to English and produced several plays in 1743 and 1744. An unknown play was also staged on 20 January 1748 for the Prince's birthday, and it was restaged on 2 February 1748.

=== Plays ===
- Lescarbot's Neptune Theatre 1606
- Molière's Tartuffe Scandal 1693
- Halifax Prologue 1776
- Sullen Indian Prologue 1826
- Eight Men Speak 1933 (at Toronto's Standard Theatre)

=== Events ===
Theatre was banned in French Canada by the Catholic clergy in 1694, but after Canada became British in 1763, theatrical activity begun to grow, foremost among the British garrisons and within amateur theatre.

Antoine Foucher (1717-1801), of Terrebonne (father of Louis-Charles Foucher), was the owner of the first Francophone theatre in Canada. In 1774, with various British officers, he staged the first production of Molière at his home in Montreal. Other Garrison performances were private shows put on for troops, publicly performed by officers, which helped bridge theatre and war during its initial stages of development. It was welcomed by the populaces and distracted soldiers from war and routine military protocol.

The first professional theatre company was Allen's Company of Comedians, which made its first performance in Montreal in 1786, and was followed by the all male French language amateur society Les Jeunes Messieurs Canadiens in Quebec City in 1789. From 1790 to 1840, amateur theatre was regularly performed at the Haymarket Theatre in Quebec City.

Officially opened on June 24, 1893 in Montreal, the Monument National is located at the historical interface between the Francophone neighbourhoods (to the east) and the Anglophone areas (to the west), it also found itself in the heart of the Jewish and Chinese sections on the most multiethnic street in the city.

Before 1825, the Hayes House Hotel on Dalhousie Square, Montreal, had a theatre that staged German Orchestras and held Viennese dances. After it burned it down, John Molson built the Theatre Royal in 1825, presenting Shakespeare and Restoration authors. It sat 1,000 guests and was also used for circuses and concerts. Edmund Kean and Charles Dickens both performed there before it was demolished in 1844 to make way for the Bonsecours Market.

In 1913, the Ottawa Drama League was formed. An amateur society, it continues today as Ottawa Little Theatre, performing Canadian and international plays with a fully volunteer cast and staff.

In the West, the Grand Theatre was built in 1912 in Calgary by the visionary Sir James Lougheed. The Grand was the initial home of many arts organizations in Calgary; the first theatre, opera, ballet, symphony concerts, and movies were seen here. This theatre was the centre of social, cultural, and political life in Calgary until the early 1960s. The Grand Theatre has been saved from demolition in 2004 by the company Theatre Junction and its director Mark Lawes.

From 1929, Martha Allan founded the Montreal Repertory Theatre and later co-founded the Dominion Drama Festival. She loathed amateur theatre, but her energies spearheaded the Canadian Little Theatre Movement at a time when live theatre in Montreal and across Canada was being threatened by the rapid expansion of the American-influenced movie theatre. She almost single-handedly laid the groundwork for the development of the professional modern Canadian theatre scene.

== Theatre of the 1940s ==
=== Plays ===
- Eros at Breakfast 1949 by Robertson Davies

=== Theatre companies and groups ===
- Ottawa Stage Society 1948 (Ottawa)
- Hudson Players Club 1948 (Hudson, Quebec) founded by the collective group of HPC
- New Play Society 1946—1971 (Toronto) founded by Dora Mavor Moore and Mavor Moore
- Canadian Repertory Theatre 1949 (Ottawa)

== Theatre of the 1950s ==
=== Plays ===
- Teach Me How To Cry 1955 Patricia Joudry

=== Theatre companies and groups ===
- Théâtre du Nouveau Monde 1951 (Montreal), founded by Jean Gascon
- Crest Theatre 1953 (Toronto) founded by Donald Davis
- Stratford Shakespeare Festival 1953 (Stratford), founded by Tom Patterson
- Manitoba Theatre Centre 1958 (Winnipeg), founded by John Hirsch
- Toronto Workshop Productions 1958 (Toronto), founded by George Luscombe

== Theatre of the 1960s ==
=== Plays ===
- Ecstasy of Rita Joe 1967 George Ryga
- Fortune and Men's Eyes 1967 John Herbert
- Les Belles-Sœurs 1968 Michel Tremblay

=== Theatre companies and groups ===
- National Theatre School of Canada 1960 (Montreal)
- Shaw Festival 1962 (Niagara on the Lake)
- Neptune Theatre (Halifax) 1963
- Vancouver Playhouse 1963 (Vancouver)
- Arts Club Theatre Company 1964 (Vancouver)
- The Citadel Theatre 1965 (Edmonton)
- Globe Theatre 1966 (Regina)
- Young People's Theatre 1966 (Toronto, theatre for young audiences)
- Theatre New Brunswick 1968 (Fredericton)
- Theatre Passe-Muraille 1968 (Toronto)
- Centaur Theatre 1969 (Montreal)
- National Arts Centre 1969 (Ottawa)

== Theatre of the 1970s ==
=== Plays ===
- How Now Black Man, 1971, Lorris Elliot
- Creeps, 1971, David Freeman
- Leaving Home 1972 David French
- The Farm Show 1972 Paul Thompson and Theatre Passe Muraille
- Hosanna 1973 Michel Tremblay
- 1837: Farmer's Revolt 1974 Rick Salutin
- The Donnellys Trilogy 1974-1975 James Reaney
- Zastrozzi, The Master of Discipline 1977 George F. Walker
- Waiting for the Parade 1977 John Murrell
- Billy Bishop Goes to War 1978 John Gray
- Balconville 1979 David Fenario
- Blitzkrieg by Bryan Wade, Tarragon Theatre, 1974

=== Theatre companies and groups ===
- Factory Theatre 1970 (Toronto), founded by Ken Gass
- Tarragon Theatre 1971 (Toronto), founded by Bill Glassco
- Toronto Free Theatre 1971 (Toronto), founded by Tom Hendry, Martin Kinch, John Palmer
- 25th Street Theatre 1972 (Saskatoon)
- Black Theatre Workshop 1972, founded by Dr. Clarence S. Bayne
- Manitoba Theatre Workshop, later Prairie Theatre Exchange 1972 (Winnipeg)
- The Second City 1973 (Toronto)
- Persephone Theatre 1974 (Saskatoon), founded by Janet Wright, Susan Wright, Brian Richmond
- Green Thumb Theatre 1975 (Vancouver, theatre for young audiences), founded by Dennis Foon
- Carbone 14 1975 (Montreal)
- Great Canadian Theatre Company 1975 (Ottawa)
- Theatre Network 1976 (Edmonton)
- VideoCabaret 1976 (Toronto), founded by Michael Hollingsworth and Deanne Taylor
- Northern Light Theatre 1977 Scott Swan (Edmonton)
- Catalyst Theatre 1977 (Edmonton)
- Necessary Angel 1978 (Toronto), founded by Richard Rose
- Buddies in Bad Times 1979 (Toronto, queer), founded by Sky Gilbert
- Nightwood Theatre 1979 (Toronto, feminist), founded by Cynthia Grant, Kim Renders, Mary Vingoe and Maureen White
- Workshop West Theatre 1979 Gerry Potter Artistic Director (Edmonton)
- Roseneath Theatre 1979 (Toronto, theatre for young audiences), founded by David S Craig and Robert Morgan

=== Events ===
With Canada's centennial in 1967 came a growing awareness of the need to cultivate a national cultural identity. Thus, the 1970s were marked by the establishment of multiple theatre institutions dedicated to the development and presentation of Canadian playwrights, such as Factory Theatre, Tarragon Theatre, and the Great Canadian Theatre Company. Theatre Passe Muraille, under Paul Thompson's directorship in the 1970s, gained a national reputation for its distinctive style of collective creation with plays such as The Farm Show, 1837: The Farmer's Revolt and I Love You, Baby Blue.

In 1971 a group of Canadian playwrights issued the Gaspé Manifesto as a call for at least one-half of the programing at publicly subsidized theatres to be Canadian content. The numerical goal was not achieved, but the following years saw an increase in Canadian content stage productions.

== Theatre of the 1980s and 1990s ==
=== Plays ===
- The Cavan Blazers 1992 Robert Winslow
- Tamara 1981 John Krizanc
- Albertine en cinq temps 1984 Michel Tremblay
- Doc 1984 Sharon Pollock
- Drag Queens on Trial 1985 Sky Gilbert
- Occupation of Heather Rose 1986 Wendy Lill
- Goodnight Desdemona (Good Morning Juliet) by Anne-Marie MacDonald
- Polygraph 1988 Robert Lepage
- Dry Lips Oughta Move to Kapuskasing 1989 Thomson Highway
- Unidentified Human Remains and the True Nature of Love 1989 Brad Fraser
- Lion in the Streets 1990 Judith Thompson
- Harlem Duet 1997 Djanet Sears
- The Drawer Boy 1999 Michael Healey

=== Theatre companies and groups ===
- Cirque du Soleil (Quebec) (early 1980s)
- The Augusta Company (Toronto, 1980)
- Windsor Feminist Theatre (Windsor, 1980)
- Native Earth Performing Arts (Toronto, 1982)
- Half the Sky Feminist Theatre (Hamilton, 1982)
- DNA Theatre (Toronto, 1982)
- Crow's Theatre (Toronto, 1982)
- One Yellow Rabbit (Calgary, 1982)
- Theatre Junction (1991)
- 4th Line Theatre (Millbrook, Ontario, 1992)
- De-ba-jeh-mu-jig Theatre 1984 (Manitoulin Island)
- Cahoots Theatre 1986 (Toronto)
- da da kamera 1986 (Toronto)
- Puente Theatre 1988 (Victoria)
- Radix Theatre 1988 (Vancouver)
- Primus Theatre 1988 (Winnipeg)
- Repercussion Theatre (Montreal, 1988)
- Théâtre Ex Machina 1990 (Quebec City)
- Rumble Productions 1990 (Vancouver)
- Theatre Projects Manitoba 1990 (Winnipeg) founded by Harry Rintoul
- Mammalian Diving Reflex 1993 (Toronto)
- Die in Debt Theatre 1993 (Toronto)
- STO Union 1992 (Wakefield)
- Artistic Fraud of Newfoundland 1995 (St. John's)
- Soulpepper Theatre Company 1997 (Toronto)
- The Electric Company Theatre 1996 (Vancouver)
- Nightswimming 1995 (Toronto)
- Sarasvati Productions 1998 (Toronto, later relocated to Winnipeg)
- Imago Theatre 1987 (Montreal)
- Common Boots Theatre 1984 (Toronto)

=== Events ===
The 1980s and 1990s saw a flourish of experimental theatre companies cropping up across Canada, many of whom were exploring site-specific and immersive staging techniques, such as Toronto's DNA Theatre and Vancouver's Radix Theatre.

== Theatre of the 2000s ==
=== Plays ===
- Elizabeth Rex 2000 Timothy Findley
- I, Claudia 2001 Kristen Thomson
- Incendies 2003 Wajdi Mouawad
- Half Life 2005 John Mighton
- Cul-de-Sac 2005 Daniel MacIvor
- blood.claat 2006 d'bi Young
- The December Man 2007 Colleen Murphy
- Palace of the End 2008 Judith Thompson
- Pyaasa 2008 Anusree Roy
- Where The Blood Mixes 2009 Kevin Loring
- East of Berlin 2009 Hannah Moscovitch

=== Theatre companies and groups ===
- Bluemouth Inc. 1998 (Toronto)
- Project Porte Parole 1998 (Montreal)
- 2b theatre company 1999 (Halifax)
- Old Trout Puppet Workshop 1999 (Calgary)
- Leaky Heaven 1999 (Vancouver)
- Zuppa Theatre 1999 (Halifax)
- Obsidian Theatre 2000 (Toronto)
- Aluna Theatre 2001 (Toronto)
- Small Wooden Shoe 2001 (Halifax/Toronto)
- fu-GEN 2002 (Toronto)
- Theatre Replacement 2003 (Vancouver)
- Kelowna Actors Studio (Kelowna)
- Realwheels Theatre 2003 (Vancouver)
- Downstage 2004 (Calgary)
- DaPoPo Theatre 2004 (Halifax)
- B2C Theatre 2004 (Toronto)
- Ecce Homo Theatre 2005 (Toronto)
- Convergence Theatre 2006 (Toronto)
- Segal Centre for Performing Arts (Montreal)
- Why Not Theatre 2007 (Toronto)
- Suburban Beast 2008 (Toronto)
- Outside The March 2009 (Toronto)
- Crane Creations Theatre Company 2015 (Mississauga)

=== Events ===
The 2000s saw the creation of several theatre companies with specific cultural mandates including Obsidian Theatre, a company supporting 'the Black voice', fu-GEN, a company dedicated to work by Asian Canadians, and Aluna Theatre, a company with a focus on Latin Canadian artists.

This decade also was a particularly significant for the rise of devised performance practices across the country, particularly in Vancouver through artists graduating from Simon Fraser University and the creation of the PuSh International Performing Arts Festival in 2006, as well as in Halifax with the founding of Zuppa Theatre. Devised and creation-based models of theatre-making continued to be underrepresented in the larger regional theatre system of the country.

== Western Canadian theatre ==
=== British Columbia ===
- Northwest of Armstrong is the Caravan Farm Theatre, a professional outdoor theatre company.
- Chemainus hosts the annual Chemainus Festival.
- The heritage village of Fort Steele includes the Wild Horse Theatre, which produces a historic revue starring professional actors during the summer months.
- Gabriola Island is home to the Gabriola Theatre Festival, which produces twelve shows over one weekend in August.
- Kamloops is home to Western Canada Theatre.
- North Vancouver has Presentation House Theatre and Centennial Theatre.
- Prince George is the home of Theatre North West.
- Vancouver is home to, among others, the Arts Club Theatre Company, the PuSh International Performing Arts Festival, the Vancouver Fringe Festival, Touchstone Theatre, Carousel Theatre, Bard on the Beach, Theatre Under the Stars, the Metro Theatre, Studio 58, Pacific Theatre, and the Firehall Arts. Vancouver had also been home to the now-defunct Vancouver Playhouse Theatre Company, which had been Vancouver's oldest professional theatre company.
- Victoria has a major regional theatre, the Belfry Theatre, as well as professional companies Theatre SKAM, SNAFU Dance Theatre Society, Blue Bridge Repertory Theatre, William Head on Stage, Theatre Inconnu, Atomic Vaudeville, Impulse Theatre, Puente Theatre Society, Suddenly Dance Theatre, and Wonderheads Theatre. Kaleidoscope is the resident Professional TYA company. Intrepid Theatre is a local alternative company and organizes both the Uno Festival and the Victoria Fringe Festival.

=== Alberta ===
- Calgary is home to Theatre Calgary, a mainstream regional theatre; Alberta Theatre Projects, a major centre for new play development in Canada; the Calgary Animated Objects Society; Vertigo Theatre, the premiere theatre in North America for the intrigue genre; Theatre Junction a multidisciplinary collective directed by Mark Lawes; One Yellow Rabbit, a touring company; and Urban Curvz, a feminist theatre company rebranded as Handsome Alice Theatre in 2016. Calgary is also home for expert marionetteer, Ronnie Burkett. Calgary is the base of operations of Loose Moose Theatre, which performs improvisational theatre. Other companies, some of which specialize in new plays, include Sage Theatre, Downstage Theatre, Ground Zero Theatre, The Shakespeare Company, StoryBook Theatre and Lunchbox Theatre.
- Edmonton is best known for the Edmonton International Fringe Festival, the first and largest fringe theatre festival in North America. The major regional theatre is the Citadel Theatre. The neighborhood of Old Strathcona contains the Theatre District, where Catalyst Theatre, Walterdale Playhouse, and the Varscona Theatre (home of several companies: Teatro la Quindicina, Shadow Theatre, Rapid Fire Theatre, Die-Nasty, and Oh Susanna!) are located. Other well-known companies, some of which specialize in new plays, include Workshop West Theatre, Northern Light, Theatre Network, and Alberta's only professional francophone theatre company, l'Unithéâtre. Edmonton is also known for its prestigious BFA conservatory-style acting program at the University of Alberta.
- Lethbridge is the home of New West Theatre, a professional theatre company. Theatre Outré also operates out of Lethbridge and presents theatrical content, subject matter, styles and forms that are alternative to what is currently offered in the community.
- Rosebud, located one hour east of Calgary, is home to Rosebud Theatre, Alberta's only rural professional theatre.
- Red Deer hosts the Scott Block Theatre.

=== Saskatchewan ===
- Regina features Saskatchewan's only permanent arena theatre, the Globe Theatre, as well as On Cue Performance Hub, a professional shared platform for independent performing artists.
- Saskatoon is home to Saskatchewan's largest theatre, Persephone Theatre, as well as Shakespeare on the Saskatchewan, the Gordon Tootoosis Nīkānīwin Theatre, Saskatchewan's francophone theatre La Troupe du Jour, Live Five and the Saskatoon Fringe Theatre Festival. Dancing Sky Theatre and the Rosthern Station Arts Centre are located 45 minutes east and north of Saskatoon, respectively.

=== Manitoba ===
- Winnipeg is the home of Le Cercle Molière (the oldest continuously running theatre company in Canada), Fantasy Theatre for Children (Manitoba's oldest children's theatre), Merlyn Productions, Manitoba Theatre for Young People, Prairie Theatre Exchange, Rainbow Stage, the Royal Manitoba Theatre Centre (Canada's oldest English-language regional theatre), Sarasvati Productions, Theatre Projects Manitoba, the Winnipeg Jewish Theatre, and the Winnipeg Fringe Festival.

=== Northwest Territories ===
- Yellowknife is home to the Northern Arts and Cultural Centre, a small theatre with just over 300 seats.

== Central Canadian theatre ==
=== Ontario ===
- Blyth is the home of Blyth Festival Theatre and Centre for the Arts.
- Brampton is home to the Rose Theatre Brampton
- Drayton Entertainment has seven stages at six theatres across Ontario including the Drayton Festival Theatre in Drayton, Hamilton Family Theatre Cambridge in Cambridge, Huron Country Playhouse in Grand Bend, King's Wharf Theatre in Penetanguishene, and St. Jacobs Country Playhouse and Schoolhouse Theatre in St. Jacobs.
- Kitchener is home to actOUT! The Kitchener Waterloo Children's Drama Workshop, which for over a quarter century has produced theatre by & for the children of the Waterloo Region.
- Kingston is home to its own professional company, Theatre Kingston, the Vagabond Repertory Theatre Company, as well as many amateur and student theatre groups. In nearby Gananoque, The Thousand Islands Playhouse features professional productions in two venues.
- London is home to Grand Theatre.
- Mississauga is home to Crane Creations Theatre Company that manages the Maja Prentice Theatre and presents Puppet Festival Mississauga each year in March.
- Niagara-on-the-Lake is best known for the Shaw Festival.
- Oshawa is home to Oshawa Little Theatre founded in 1928 and running continuously since 1950; offers four productions a year as well as a youth group production. It runs out of its own facility on Russet Ave. since 1983.
- Ottawa is home to the multi-venue National Arts Centre and the smaller Great Canadian Theatre Company and Gladstone Theatre. It holds the Ottawa Fringe Festival annually in June. The Ottawa Little Theatre, founded in 1913, is the longest-running community theatre company in Canada.
- Stratford is best known for the Stratford Festival.
- Sudbury has the regional theatre companies Sudbury Theatre Centre and Théâtre du Nouvel-Ontario.
- Thunder Bay has Magnus Theatre, The Dr. S. Penny Petrone Centre for the Performing Arts, a regional professional theatre company.
- Toronto has a large and vibrant theatre scene, centred around the Toronto Theatre District, with many different companies. Some produce large-scale Broadway-style productions (produced by companies like Mirvish Productions), and others produce smaller-scale plays by Canadian and other playwrights. Some of the major theatre companies of Toronto include: Canadian Stage Company, Tarragon Theatre, Theatre Passe-Muraille, the Factory Theatre, Soulpepper Theatre Company, the Lower Ossington Theatre and Buddies in Bad Times. The Harbourfront Centre's World Stage festival presents innovative contemporary performance from national and international companies. Toronto has several theatre festivals throughout the year, including The Next Stage Festival in January, Toronto Fringe Festival in June, and SummerWorks in August. Important smaller companies include Native Earth, Nightwood Theatre, Necessary Angel, Crow's Theatre, Obsidian Theatre, Acting Upstage, and Volcano. 2012 saw a surge of storefront theatres opening in the city including Videofag and The Storefront Theatre.
- In Windsor, Windsor Light Music Theatre has been staging musicals, operettas and other theatre productions since 1948.

=== Quebec ===
- Montréal's theatre scene is split between French and English language theatre. The city is home to Le Festival TransAmériques, the Montreal Fringe Festival, the National Theatre School of Canada, the Segal Centre for Performing Arts, the Centaur Theatre, Usine C, le Théâtre du Nouveau Monde, Imago Theatre, and Canada's oldest professional Black theatre company, The Black Theatre Workshop.
- Trois-Rivières is home to Le Théâtre des Nouveaux Compagnons, the oldest French-speaking theatre company in Canada.
- Québec City is the home of Robert Lepage's company Ex Machina and le Grand Théâtre de Québec.

== Atlantic Canada ==
=== New Brunswick ===
- Moncton has the restored Capitol Theatre, one of only eight theatres of the ca. 1922 Pantages/Vaudeville design in the nation.
- Saint John has the restored Imperial Theatre, an historic ca. 1913 modern adaptation of the Italian Renaissance.
- Fredericton is host to The Playhouse, a gift to the people of New Brunswick by Lord Beaverbrook in 1964.
- Theatre New Brunswick is a provincial theatre company.

=== Prince Edward Island ===
- Charlottetown is home to Charlottetown Festival and Confederation Centre of the Arts, with its 1,100 seat main stage being one of Atlantic Canada's pre-eminent performing arts facilities.
- Watermark Theatre - a professional theatre presenting classic and modern classic plays in North Rustico

=== Nova Scotia ===
- Amongst Halifax's theatre producers are Neptune Theatre, Shakespeare by the Sea, 2b theatre company, Zuppa Theatre, DaPoPo Theatre and Canada's longest continuously running community theatre The Theatre Arts Guild. Halifax's theatre venues include The Bus Stop and the Rebecca Cohn Auditorium. See Culture of the Halifax Regional Municipality.
- Cape Breton Regional Municipality has both the Highland Arts Theatre performing arts centre in Sydney, and the Savoy Theatre, long considered a cultural centre for Cape Breton Island, located in Glace Bay.
- Antigonish has Festival Antigonish Summer Theatre, and Theatre Antigonish Antigonish.
- Parrsboro has Ship's Company Theatre.
- Wolfville was home to the Atlantic Theatre Festival.

=== Newfoundland and Labrador ===
- St. John's has the RCA (Resource Centre for the Arts), an artist-run company that is based at the LSPU Hall. It also has the St. John's Arts and Culture Centre, with a 1,000 seat main theatre.
- Clarenville, Newfoundland is the home to The New Curtain Theatre Company, which operates as a year-round professional theatre based out of The Loft Theatre at the White Hills Ski Resort in Clarenville (2 hours west of St. John's).
- Cupids, Newfoundland is home to The New World Theatre Project, which aims to do work from and inspired by the year 1610, when Cupids was settled as Canada's first English colony.
- Stephenville, Newfoundland and Labrador, on the west coast of the island of Newfoundland, features the annual Stephenville Theatre Festival, a summer festival that began in the mid-1970s.
- In Corner Brook, the Grenfell Campus of Memorial University offers a Bachelor of Fine Arts degree in Theatre, with productions staged every semester.

== Summer festivals ==
Major summer theatre festivals include:

- 4th Line Theatre based in Millbrook, Ontario, Ontario.
- Gabriola Theatre Festival (Gabriola Island, British Columbia)
- Bard on the Beach Shakespeare Festival, based in Vancouver, British Columbia.
- Blyth Festival Theatre, based in Blyth, Ontario
- Stratford Festival, based in Stratford, Ontario.
- Shaw Festival, based in Niagara-on-the-Lake, Ontario.
- Thousand Islands Playhouse, based in Gananoque, Ontario.
- Charlottetown Festival, based in Charlottetown, Prince Edward Island.
- Festival Antigonish Summer Theatre, based in Antigonish, Nova Scotia.
- Shakespeare by the Sea, based in Halifax, Nova Scotia.
- Magnetic North Theatre Festival, based in Ottawa, Ontario and held annually, alternating between Ottawa and another Canadian city.
- Shakespeare on the Saskatchewan Festival in Saskatoon, Saskatchewan

As of 2014, Canada had more fringe theatre festivals than any other country, forming a summer fringe circuit running from St-Ambroise Montréal Fringe in June and heading westward to Vancouver Fringe Festival in September. The circuit includes the two largest fringe festivals in North America, Winnipeg Fringe Theatre Festival and Edmonton International Fringe Festival. Other fringe theatre festivals include Atlantic Fringe Festival, Calgary Fringe Festival, London Fringe Theatre Festival, Ottawa Fringe Festival, Saskatoon Fringe Theatre Festival and Toronto Fringe Festival.

== See also ==
- List of Canadian playwrights
- List of Canadian plays
