= IFAO =

IFAO may refer to:

- Institut Français d'Archéologie Orientale, the French Institute of Eastern Archaeology (Cairo, Egypt)
- International Festival of Animated Objects, a 10-day festival of puppetry and related arts (Calgary, Canada)
