= Theatre Royal, Montréal =

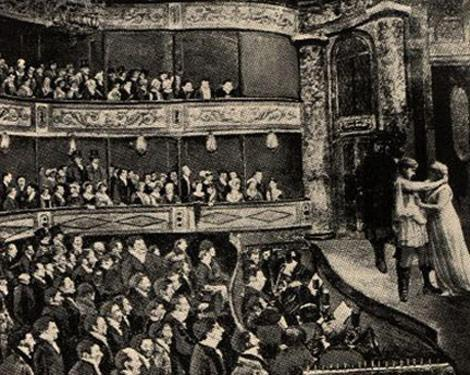
Theatre Royal Montreal 1825

The Theatre Royal in Montréal in Canada, also known as the Molson Theatre, was the first public theatre in Canada. It was inaugurated in 1825, was given a new building in 1851, and closed in 1930.

== History ==
The Theatre Royal played in important role in the history of the Theatre of Canada. Theatre, which had been banned in Canada during the French period, begun to flourish as amateur theatre after Canada became British, and the first professional theatre companies started to tour the country, starting with the Allen's Company of Comedians in 1785. However, there was no public theatre play house until the foundation of the Theatre Royal in Montréal, as the Haymarket Theatre, Quebec (1790-1840) was used only by private amateur theatre societies.

The Theatre Royal in Montréal was founded by the merchant John Molson. It was consequently also referred to as the Molson Theatre. The theatre had room for 1000 spectators and was financed with a cost of $30,000. The original idea was to make it a permanent theatre with a permanent staff, and it was inaugurated with a staff of 50 people. It was an English-language theatre, and staged plays by Shakespeare and English authors of the Restoration period. The initiative attracted attention, and the first public theatre in Quebec, the Theatre Royal, Quebec, was founded later that same year.

The Theatre Royal was not economically sustainable and the management had to give up the goal to make it a permanent theatre the following year. However, it became the main local for the travelling theatre companies who visited Canada more and more frequently in the 19th century. Concerts, circus performance and other public entertainments was also staged there.

The original building was torn down in 1844–45, and the theatre was given a new building in 1851.

After then-manager of the Theatre Royal, John Buckland, died in November 1872, he was succeeded by his wife, Kate Horn as manager. She served in the position until 1880.
