= Mercedes Bátiz-Benét =

Mexican-Spanish-Canadian playwright,theatre director, and designer

- Bátiz-Benét in 2023
- Born: 1977 (age 48–49); Mexico City, Mexico
- Education: University of Victoria (BA)
- Occupations: Playwright, director, designer
- Years active: 2001–present
- Known for: Artistic Director of Puente Theatre; adaptation Blood Wedding: The Forest Remembers
- Spouse: Judd Palmer

Mercedes Bátiz-Benét (born 1977) is a Mexican-Spanish-Canadian theatre director, playwright, and designer based in Victoria, British Columbia. She is the Artistic Director of Puente Theatre and co-founder of the Great Works Theatre Festival. Her work often explores themes of migration, memory, identity, and belonging through interdisciplinary and ritual-based performance.

Bátiz-Benét has written and directed numerous Canadian theatre productions, including El Jinete: A Mariachi Opera (2014), Gruff (2014), The Party (2020), and Blood Wedding: The Forest Remembers (2025). She has collaborated with major theatre institutions across Canada, including the National Arts Centre, Firehall Arts Centre, and Caravan Farm Theatre.

Focus on Victoria described her work as "bridging cultures and forms through ritual, poetry, and memory."

== Early life and education ==
Bátiz-Benét was born and raised in Mexico City and Cuernavaca, Morelos, and immigrated to Canada in 1997. She became a landed immigrant in 2008 and a Canadian citizen in 2016. She earned a Bachelor of Fine Arts with distinction in Creative Writing and a Bachelor of Arts (Honours) in Philosophy from the University of Victoria. She also completed a Diploma in Motion Picture Production from the Victoria Motion Picture School in 2002.

== Personal life ==
Bátiz-Benét is married to writer, director, designer, and puppet artist Judd Palmer, co-founder of The Old Trout Puppet Workshop.

== Career ==
Since 2011, Bátiz-Benét has served as Artistic Director of Puente Theatre, a company dedicated to amplifying the voices and stories of immigrants, newcomers, and equity-seeking communities in Canada. During her tenure, Puente has developed, produced, and toured new Canadian works, interdisciplinary collaborations, and developed mentorship programs and residencies supporting emerging IBPoC artists.

=== Selected writing and directing credits ===
- The Secret Sorrow of Hatchet Jack MacPhee (2008), co-written with Judd Palmer and produced by Caravan Farm Theatre.
- The Erotic Anguish of Don Juan (2009), co-written with the Old Trout Puppet Workshop, Vanessa Porteous, and George Fenwick.
- The Umbrella (2012), co-written with Judd Palmer and directed by Bátiz-Benét, with original music by Julia Knight.
- El Jinete: A Mariachi Opera (2014), written and directed by Bátiz-Benét, presented at the SummerWorks Performance Festival in Toronto; she received the Canadian Stage Award for Direction.
- Gruff (2014), a musical co-written by Bátiz-Benét and Judd Palmer, produced by Puente Theatre.
- Cruel Tears / Lágrimas Crueles (2014), an adaptation of the Canadian musical *Cruel Tears*, written by Bátiz-Benét and co-produced by Puente Theatre and Blue Bridge Repertory Theatre.
- Lieutenant Nun (2015), dramaturged and directed by Bátiz-Benét with SNAFU Dance Theatre.
- Fado: The Saddest Music in the World (2018–19; revived 2023 with the Firehall Arts Centre), directed by Bátiz-Benét; winner of the JAYMAC Outstanding Production Award.
- That Elusive Spark (2019), directed by Bátiz-Benét for Langham Court Theatre.
- The Party (2020), written and directed by Bátiz-Benét, commissioned by the National Arts Centre for its Grand Acts of Theatre program.
- Miss Julie (2023), directed by Bátiz-Benét for Blue Bridge Repertory Theatre.
- Blood Wedding: The Forest Remembers (2025), written and directed by Bátiz-Benét, premiering as the flagship production of the inaugural Great Works Theatre Festival.

In 2025, Bátiz-Benét directed Remembering Mary's Wedding for Pacific Opera Victoria, a sequel to Stephen Massicotte's play and the opera of the same name, with music composed by Andrew Paul MacDonald and a libretto by Massicotte—who also created the new sequel version—produced to mark Remembrance Day.

Bátiz-Benét has also designed sets and costumes for many of her productions, integrating visual, ritual, and poetic elements into the staging to create a unified theatrical language.

== Great Works Theatre Festival ==
In 2025, Bátiz-Benét co-founded the Great Works Theatre Festival with Blue Bridge Repertory Theatre, launching at the Belfry Theatre's Patrick Stewart Stage. The festival's inaugural season featured Blood Wedding: The Forest Remembers and La Bête, and established a model for repertory collaboration between independent and established companies on Vancouver Island.

== Recognition ==
Bátiz-Benét's work has been recognized with the Canadian Stage Award for Direction (2014), the JAYMAC Outstanding Production Award (2019), and the PARC Retirement Living Mid-Career Artist Award (2022). She was named a Distinguished Alumni by the University of Victoria Faculty of Fine Arts in 2015.
