= Gaspé Manifesto =

Manifesto by Canadian theatre professionals

The Gaspé Manifesto was a controversial manifesto produced by a group of leading Canadian theatre professionals in connection with a 1971 conference in Gaspé, Quebec sponsored by the Canada Council. Its main suggestion called for publicly subsidized theatres to ensure that at least half of their productions would be Canadian content by 1973. There were two key goals in mind, to create a national theatre and to improve the conditions of playwrights. In the years that followed this manifesto more Canadian content was performed in Canadian theatres, although the 50% goal was not attained.

The Gaspé Manifesto can be found in Canadian Theatre History by Don Rubin.
