= Kate Horn =

American actress

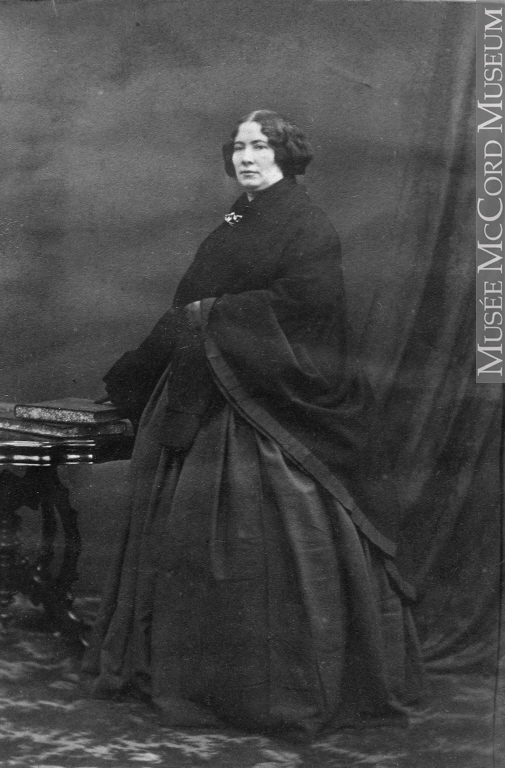
- Kate Horn in 1861
- Born: c. 1826; Ireland
- Died: September 10, 1896 (aged 69–70); Montreal, Quebec, Canada
- Other name: Kate Buckland (married name)
- Occupations: Actress and director
- Years active: 1842—1880

Kate Horn (c. 1826–1896) was a Canadian stage actress and theater director. She was a popular actress and was the managing director of the Theatre Royal, Montréal from 1873 to 1880.

== Early life ==
Kate Horn was an orphan born in Ireland. At age 16, she emigrated to the United States.

== Career ==
She made her debut on the stage in Charleston, South Carolina under the patronage of actress Sarah H. Timm in 1842. From 1845 until 1852, she was engaged at the Park Theatre in New York, where she had a successful career, performed with stars such as George Clifford Jordan, Annie Walters, Charlotte Saunders Cushman, Edward Loomis Davenport and William Pleater Davidge, and was called “one of the most beautiful women on the stage”.

Horn made her Montreal stage debut on July 14, 1852, playing Mrs. Ormsby Delmaine in The Serious Family. From 1852 to 1864, she divided her time between regular tours to the Theatre Royal, Montréal in Canada, where her spouse John Buckland was the manager of the Theatre Royal, and New York, where she was engaged in several different companies. In 1864, she settled permanently in Montréal, where she was one of the star actors of the Theatre Royal and a respected member of the fashionable society in Montreal. When her husband died in 1872, she succeeded him as manager of the theatre. She retired from both management and acting in 1880, but continued to be active in the theatrical life of the city.

== Personal life ==
Horn married English-born John Buckland in the Spring of 1852 becoming Kate Buckland. The two settled permanently in Montreal in 1864. John predeceased Horn in November 1872; he was 57. Horn lived on Dorchester Street. She fell ill in 1896 and died at Home Hospital. She was buried at St. Patrick's Church in Montreal.
