= Canadian content =

Portion of Canadian contribution in broadcast work

Canadian content (abbreviated CanCon, cancon or can-con; French: contenu canadien) refers to the Canadian Radio-television and Telecommunications Commission (CRTC) requirements, derived from the Broadcasting Act of Canada, that radio and television broadcasters (including cable and satellite specialty channels, and since the passing of the Online Streaming Act, Internet-based video services) must produce and broadcast a certain percentage of content that was at least partly written, produced, presented, or otherwise contributed to by persons from Canada. CanCon also refers to that content itself, and, more generally, to cultural and creative content that is Canadian in nature.

Current Canadian content percentages are as follows: radio airplay is 35% (with partial exceptions for some specialty formats such as classical). Some stations are required to air a higher percentage based on their "promise of performance" information during their license submission. Broadcast television is 55% CanCon yearly or 50% daily (CBC has a 60% CanCon quota; some specialty or multicultural formats have lower percentages).

== Origins ==
Pierre Juneau, who was the chair of the Canadian Radio-television and Telecommunications Commission (CRTC) introduced regulations that imposed requirements for Canadian radio stations to dedicate at least 30 percent of all airplay to Canadian musicians. The purpose of this regulation was to bolster the Canadian music industry, which at the time had been struggling to compete with American and British musical acts. In enforcing the Broadcasting Act, the CRTC is obligated to ensure that "each element of the Canadian broadcasting system shall contribute in an appropriate manner to the creation and presentation of Canadian programming", and that every broadcast undertaking "[makes] maximum use, and in no case less than predominant use, of Canadian creative and other resources in the creation and presentation of programming".

== Radio ==
=== Music radio ===
For music, the Canadian content requirements are referred to as the MAPL system, referring to the music, artist, performance and lyrics.

==== Criteria ====
To qualify as Canadian content a musical selection must generally fulfil at least two of the following conditions (one if recorded prior to January 1972):

- M (music) — the music is composed entirely by a Canadian
- A (artist) — the music is, or the lyrics are, performed principally by a Canadian
- P (performance) — the musical selection consists of a performance that is:
  - Recorded wholly in Canada, or
  - Performed wholly in Canada and broadcast live in Canada.
- L (lyrics) — the lyrics are written entirely by a Canadian

For the purposes of MAPL, a "Canadian" refers to a citizen, permanent resident, someone whose "ordinary place of residence" has been in Canada prior to their contribution to the musical selection, or someone who is a CRTC licensee.

A musical selection may also qualify as Canadian content if it:

- Is an instrumental performance of a composition by a Canadian.
- Is a "performance of a musical composition that a Canadian has composed for instruments only."
- Was performed live or recorded after September 1, 1991, meets the criteria for either artist or performance, and a Canadian receives at least half of the credit for music and lyrics.

Some stations – especially those playing formats where there may be a limited number of Canadian recordings suitable for airplay, such as classical, jazz or oldies, may be allowed by the CRTC to meet Canadian content targets as low as 20 per cent. Stations in Windsor, Ontario, are also permitted to meet lower Canadian content targets, due to Windsor's proximity to the Metro Detroit media market in the United States. Community radio and campus-based community radio stations often choose to meet higher Canadian content levels than commercial broadcasters, because of their mandate to support independent and underground and provide content not readily available on commercial radio or the CBC; however, this is a voluntary commitment made by these stations rather than a core CRTC requirement, and CanCon requirements may be lower for campus and community stations as they often air large quantities of category 3 music.

On satellite radio services, Canadian content regulation is applied in aggregate over the whole subscription package. SiriusXM Canada produces channels focused on Canadian music, talk, and spoken word programming (such as Canada Talks, The Verge, and Just for Laughs Radio), and carries the CBC's main national networks (CBC Radio One and Ici Radio-Canada Première). All of these channels are incorporated into the overall lineup of the U.S. Sirius XM Radio service. The CBC also produced channels carried on the service, such as CBC Radio 3; these channels were quietly dropped from SiriusXM in 2022, with the CBC focusing more on internet radio via the CBC Listen platform.

==== History ====
Following an extensive public hearing process organized by the CRTC, the MAPL system, created by Stan Klees (co-creator of the Juno Award), was adopted in 1971 to define and identify Canadian content in pieces of music for the purposes of increasing exposure of Canadian music on Canadian radio through content regulations governing a percentage (25%) of airplay to be devoted to Canadian music. The percentage was increased to 30% in the 1980s, and to 35% effective January 3, 1999. However, most new commercial radio stations licensed since 1999 have been licensed at 40%.

Before the MAPL system was established in 1971, Canadian music was regarded with indifference by Canadian radio, and during the 1960s, Canadian radio was dominated by British or American acts. This was a major hurdle for Canadian musicians, since they could not gain attention in their home country without having a hit single in the United States or Europe first, which itself proved to be a nearly impossible task in the 1960s. This eventually changed when The Guess Who broke through in the United States in March 1969 with a string of hits, which was soon followed by a "Canadian chart boom" in which The Guess Who's success was followed by the entries of Gordon Lightfoot, Anne Murray, Edward Bear, Canada Goose, Mashmakhan, Motherlode, The Original Caste, and The Poppy Family onto the charts by 1970. Even after MAPL was implemented in the early 1970s, mandating certain percentages of Canadian Content to be played between 6 AM and midnight, some radio stations were criticized for ghettoizing their Canadian content to dedicated program blocks, in off-peak listening hours such as very early mornings (between 6 AM and 7) and/or 8 PM to midnight. During these hours (which, if they were all used, represented 27.8% of the 18-hour listening day), the music played would be almost entirely Canadian — thus having the effect of significantly reducing how many Canadian songs would actually have to be played during peak listening times. These program blocks became mockingly known as "beaver hours," featuring Canadian songs selected from the "beaver bin." This practice is now reduced by CRTC regulations stipulating that CanCon percentages must be met between 6 a.m. and 6 p.m., rather than allowing a station to save all their Canadian content for off-peak hours.

Artists who were active in the early CanCon era in the 1970s and 1980s have noted that their music was often dismissed by Canadian audiences as inferior product, propped up by quotas rather than quality, if they were unable to replicate their Canadian success internationally. Yet, at the same time, artists who did break through internationally also ran the risk of becoming dismissed by Canadian audiences as no longer truly Canadian.

By the 1980s, there were a range CanCon requirements depending on the radio band (AM or FM) and music programming format. AM radio required 30% of the music broadcast in a day be Canadian, and that these selections be "reasonably distributed throughout the [6:00 am to midnight] broadcast day". Five percent of all records had to be two-count Canadian. FM radio had different requirements; the CRTC's Peter G. Fleming explained in 1985 that "perceiving AM as low brow and FM as high brow [the CRTC] wanted to ensure the status quo". Hit music was limited on FM radio by restricting a single song to 3 plays per day and a playlist to only 50% top-40 hits. FM stations had to commit to play a certain format and each of these FM formats had a different CanCon quotas (e.g. The "Pop And Rock Softer" stations required 10% for easy listening and 20% for adult contemporary, album-oriented rock stations were also at 20% and country at 30%).

The 1991 half credit for music and lyrics provision was added after Canadian Bryan Adams' album Waking Up the Neighbours did not qualify as Canadian as Adams co-wrote both the music and the lyrics with South African producer Robert John "Mutt" Lange, and he did not primarily record the album in Canada, and therefore only fulfilled one of the criteria fully. It was noted that if Adams had written all the lyrics, and Lange all the music (or vice versa), the collaboration would have counted as Canadian content. As a result, under CRTC regulations of the time, none of the album's songs were considered Canadian content.

In December 2022, the CRTC announced a proposal to update the MAPL system to account for changes in the music industry and reduce regulatory burden. The proposal would remove the "performance" condition entirely, and only require lyrics and music to be principally (at least 50%) written or composed by a Canadian to qualify as Canadian content.

=== Talk radio and American syndicated programming ===
There are no specific rules on Canadian content in regard to spoken word programming. The lone restriction is that the station must have a working studio within the region it broadcasts, which prohibits the use of entirely satellite-operated stations (which are commonplace in the United States).

As in the United States in the 1980s, the trend for AM stations in Canada in the 1990s was to apply for an FM broadcasting license or move away from music in favour of talk radio formats. (Since the late 2000s, AM radio in North America has been declining as stations have shut down and moved to FM.) The total amount of Canadian-produced content declined as broadcasters could license syndicated radio programs produced in the U.S., while the Cancon regulations were conceived to apply to music only, and not to spoken-word programming. This became particularly controversial in 1998 when stations in Toronto and Montreal started airing The Howard Stern Show from New York City during prime daytime hours. Stern was forced off the air not because of Canadian content, but because the Canadian Broadcast Standards Council reprimanded the stations broadcasting Stern numerous times for Stern's comments, which prompted the two stations to drop him in short order. Stern would later move exclusively to satellite radio.

Spoken word programming that is imported from the United States tends to be aired in off-peak hours and pertain to either general interest content or sports radio. The most popular American conservative talk radio programs have never been carried in Canada, mostly because of return on investment: the shows traditionally charge high rights fees but have substantially less resonance or relevance to Canadian audiences.

American shows that combine talk and music, such as Blair Garner, Elvis Duran, Delilah and John Tesh, usually have special playlists for airing in Canada to assist in meeting Canadian content requirements. Because of the different requirements, American syndicated oldies programs were widely popular in Canada, since those shows usually did need to not substitute Canadian songs, due in part to a fairly large library of Canadian musicians already in rotation in the format and the format had looser standards. In other formats, an American syndicated program sometimes is supplemented with an all-Canadian program; for instance, CKMX, during its country era, broadcast Country Countdown USA and America's Grand Ole Opry Weekend along with the Canadian syndicated programs Canadian Country Spotlight and Hugh McLennan's Spirit of the West, the last of which is also carried by several U.S. stations. American syndicated series are usually played in "off peak" and weekend hours.

A notable exception to the majority-Canadian spoken word programming came in 2012 when Astral Media introduced CKSL and CHAM, two stations in southern Ontario, as full-time affiliates of 24/7 Comedy Radio, a service of the U.S.-based Cumulus Media Networks. CHAM met its studio requirement by maintaining a locally based interstitial host.

== Film and television ==
Canadian television programming, particularly dramatic programming in prime-time, has historically faced significant economic challenges compared to radio. Purchasing Canadian broadcast rights to an existing American prime-time series is generally less expensive for Canadian stations than financing a new domestic production. Additionally, given the extensive reach of major U.S. broadcast networks into Canada, Canadian broadcasters have limited ability to delay or modify U.S. programs' broadcast schedules — a practice used in some other foreign markets to reduce competition from imported programming or create space for domestically produced content.

In English Canada, presently only the public network, CBC Television, devotes the vast majority of its prime time schedule to Canadian content, having dropped U.S. network series in the mid-1990s. The French-language industry, centered in Quebec, similarly places a larger emphasis on original productions, as they have historically been more profitable than dubs of imported English-language programming, and to prioritize the province's insular "star system" of local talent. The English commercial networks (CTV, Global and Citytv), conversely, rely on news and information programs for the bulk of their Canadian content while running mostly American network series, but do still commission some domestic productions for prime time broadcasts.

Some have suggested that Canadian content minimums be enacted for movie theatres, in order to improve the visibility and commercial viability of Canadian film, although none have ever been put in place. Most film festivals in Canada devote at least a portion of their schedules to Canadian films, although this is by choice rather than government regulation; a few film festivals are devoted exclusively to Canadian films, although most screen a mix of Canadian and international films. However, as movie-based premium television services such as Crave, Super Channel, Hollywood Suite and Super Écran operate on television and thus must follow Canadian content regulations, they do acquire and program Canadian films; this often still represents a Canadian film's best opportunity to attract an audience beyond the film festival circuit.

=== Regulations ===
The CRTC presently requires that at least 55% of all programming aired annually by broadcast television stations, and at least 50% of programming aired daily from 6:00 pm to midnight, must be Canadian content. In May 2011, the annual CanCon requirement for private television broadcasters was lowered from 60% to 55% yearly. The CBC remains subject to the 60% quota.

As part of its current "group-based" approach to the licensing of broadcast and discretionary specialty channels owned by the largest private broadcasting groups (such as Bell Media, Corus, and Rogers), the CRTC requires that at least 30% of a group's revenue (which is aggregated across all of a group's television services, based on their individual revenue and historical expenditure mandates) must be invested into Canadian programming expenditures (CPEs). CPEs can be reallocated between a group's individual services, and up to 25% of CPEs for local stations can be allocated from a discretionary service. All services must also invest 5% of their revenue towards the production of programs of national interest (PNI), which include comedy, drama, long-form documentaries, children's programming, and qualifying awards presentations honouring Canadian creative talent. In 2017, the CRTC instituted a further requirement that 75% of the PNI expenditure must fund productions by independent companies. The CRTC also added credits on CPE for the involvement of producers from Indigenous (50%) and official language minority communities (25%; French outside of Quebec, and English within Quebec).

Historically, much of these requirements have been fulfilled by lower-cost non-scripted programming, including networked talk shows and entertainment news programs, local newscasts and public affairs programming, and reruns of Canadian-produced library programs. Further complicating matters for Canadian content is the existence of simultaneous substitution, a regulation that allows over-the-air broadcasters to require the substitution of feeds from American broadcast channels on local multichannel television providers if they are airing the same programming in simulcast, thus protecting their exclusive rights to earn revenue off such programming whenever it is broadcast in Canada. Therefore, Canadian networks have made significant effort to import popular American series to take advantage of the rule, which in turn crowds out Canadian programming to less-desirable time slots.

Over the years the CRTC has tried a number of strategies intended to increase the success of Canadian programming, including expenditure requirements and time credits for productions with specific requirements. In 1999, the CRTC mandated that stations owned by the largest private groups air at least eight hours of Canadian "priority programming" per-week between the hours of 7 and 11 p.m.; priority programming included scripted programs, documentaries, entertainment news, and variety programs. This was replaced in 2010 with the current licensing framework, which places a larger focus on overall investments into Canadian content and the similar concept of "programs of national interest", as opposed to scheduling and quantity.

The Online Streaming Act allows the CRTC to classify streaming services (online undertakings) as broadcasters for regulatory purposes, including imposing Canadian content obligations similar to those applied to licensed television undertakings. In June 2024, the CRTC announced that foreign streaming services with more than $25 million in annual revenue must contribute 5% of their annual revenue to expenditures funding the production of Canadian content.

=== Criteria ===
What is considered Canadian content is primarily determined by the CRTC, with the Canadian Audio-Visual Certification Office (CAVCO) also offering tax credits for works certified as being Canadian content: The CRTC's requirements for a Canadian program were most recently updated in November 2025 as part of the implementation of the Online Streaming Act, with a goal to modernize the requirements to reflect industry developments, and accommodate foreign co-productions while providing safeguards to ensure adequate contributions and ownership by Canadians:

- The program's production company must be Canadian, and a Canadian entity must hold at least 20% of the copyrights in the program.
- The director or screenwriter/scriptwriter, and at least one of the two lead performers, must be a Canadian citizen or permanent resident. For animated programs, the storyboard supervisor, key animation, and (virtual) camera operator must also be Canadian.
- The production must meet a quota for the inclusion of Canadians in key creative roles. A maximum of 15 points are available, with directors, screenwriters, and showrunners being worth 2 points each, and the top two leads and other creative roles (including production designer, art director, director of photography, picture editor, composers, and the directors of visual effects, costume, makeup, and hair design departments) being worth one point each. The exact quota is a percentage determined by the level of foreign ownership in the copyrights of a program:
  - If foreign companies hold the majority (51% or more) of the copyright, the production must reach at least 80% of the points quota for Canadian creative positions, at least 50% of those credited as a producer, co-producer, line producer, or production manager must be Canadian, and the program must be produced by a Canadian company that has "no less than equal measure of decision-making responsibility with partners on all creative elements of the production."
  - If Canadian companies hold the majority of the copyright alongside foreign stakeholders, the production must reach at least 60% of the points quota for Canadian creative positions, at least 50% of those credited as a producer, co-producer, line producer, or production manager must be Canadian, and the program must be produced by a Canadian company that has "no less than equal measure of decision-making responsibility with partners on all creative elements of the production."
  - If Canadian entities are the sole copyright holder, the production must reach at least 60% of the points quota for Canadian creative positions. Everyone credited as a producer, co-producer, line producer, or production manager must be Canadian, but the production is eligible for "courtesy credits" for the use of non-Canadians in certain production roles, subject to restrictions.
  - One bonus point each is available for programs that:
    - Utilize characters and settings which are recognizably Canadian (inclusive of Indigenous communities).
    - Are adaptations of written creative works by a Canadian.
    - Contain a soundtrack where at least 50% of its non-original music is Canadian, and the program has either a Canadian composer or no composer at all.
- At least 75% of all costs incurred for production services, as well as 75% of all costs incurred in post-production, must be for services provided in Canada.

The new policy includes other changes, such as an explicit statement that generative AI should not be used as a substitute for human effort in key creative roles.

=== Examples ===
Early Canadian programming was often produced merely to fill content requirements, and featured exceedingly low budgets, rushed production schedules, poor writing and little in the way of production values, and as a result did not attract much of an audience. One Canadian series, The Trouble with Tracy, is sometimes claimed as one of the worst television shows ever produced. Canadian networks scheduled American imports earlier in the evening, hoping that audiences would stay for the less popular domestic productions. However, even given these limitations, some productions managed to rise above the mediocre; SCTV (originally on Global) and Smith & Smith (CHCH) grew from local low-budget productions with a limited audience to large production companies with a North American audience. SCTV lampooned the Cancon rules, and a request by the CBC for a filler segment featuring distinctively Canadian content, by developing the stereotypically Canadian characters Bob and Doug McKenzie (Rick Moranis and Dave Thomas) . Bob and Doug would become the program's most popular characters, and spawned spin-off media such as comedy albums, commercials, the feature film Strange Brew, and the animated series Bob & Doug.

In the 1980s and early 1990s, distinctly Canadian drama series such as CBC's Street Legal or CTV's E.N.G. consistently drew hundreds of thousands of viewers each week. In the latter part of the 1990s and the early 2000s, Global's Traders and the CBC dramas Da Vinci's Inquest and Republic of Doyle completed long runs, buoyed by critical approval if not overwhelming viewer success (though they have since become mainstays of both Canadian and American syndication). As for CTV, after short-lived runs of planned "flagship" drama series such as The City, The Associates and The Eleventh Hour, the network later found ratings success with series such as Corner Gas (a sitcom set at an eponymous gas station in rural Saskatchewan, filmed in the town of Rouleau), Flashpoint, and Motive. The CBC dramedy This Is Wonderland was a moderate success with a loyal fan base, but was nonetheless cancelled in 2006 after three seasons. Specialty channels also naturally produce Canadian content, some of which, most notably Showcase's mockumentary series Trailer Park Boys, have been able to generate a strong mass appeal.

To complement their airings of American or British versions, Canadian networks have also produced local versions of unscripted television formats, including reality television series such as The Amazing Race Canada, Canadian Idol, MasterChef Canada, and The Traitors Canada (CTV), The Great Canadian Baking Show (CBC), Big Brother Canada (Global), The Bachelor Canada and Canada's Got Talent (Citytv), and Canada's Drag Race (Crave).

Canadian networks have sometimes fulfilled Cancon requirements by commissioning series filmed in Canada, but intended to be sold to broadcasters in larger foreign markets such as the United States and United Kingdom, such as CTV's Saving Hope, Sue Thomas: F.B.Eye, Mysterious Ways, and Twice in a Lifetime, and Global's Wild Card and Rookie Blue. International co-productions such as Orphan Black (Space and BBC America), Copper (Showcase and BBC America), Killjoys (Space and Syfy), The Tudors (CBC, Showtime, BBC and TV3), and the early seasons of the current incarnation of Doctor Who (which was partially funded by the CBC) are also common.

A few Canadian drama series, including Due South, The Listener, Motive, Flashpoint, and Saving Hope, have also been picked up by American networks and aired in prime time, although the majority of Canadian TV series which have aired in the United States have done so either in syndication, on cable channels, or on minor networks such as The CW and Ion Television. SCTV aired in a late night slot on NBC in the early 1980s. CBS aired Crimetime After Primetime, a late-night block of crime dramas in the late 1980s and early 1990s which included a number of Canadian series, including Night Heat, Hot Shots, Adderly, Forever Knight and Diamonds, and later aired The Kids in the Hall in a late-night slot as well. The Red Green Show was also a success, being imported into the United States via PBS member stations. That show's cast often did pledge drive specials and received strong viewer support on PBS stations in the northern part of the United States, such as Iowa, Minnesota, Wisconsin, Michigan, New Hampshire and New York.

The CBC sitcom Schitt's Creek was co-produced with U.S. cable network Pop as its first original scripted series, but its later addition to the streaming service Netflix helped to bolster wider public awareness and critical acclaim of the series in the United States and worldwide. This culminated at the 72nd Primetime Emmy Awards in 2020 following its final season, where Schitt's Creek became the first series to sweep all seven major awards in their respective genre in the same year, and Dan Levy became the first to win awards for acting, directing, producing, and writing in the same year.

Canadian commercial television networks schedule a large percentage of their Canadian productions to air in the summer season; although traditionally a season of low viewership, this practice has actually been beneficial for Canadian television productions, influenced by widespread viewer preference for new programming over off-season repeats, as well as an increased chance of gaining a lucrative sale to one of the big four American networks—a revenue stream which is generally unavailable during the fall and winter television seasons.

The impact of the COVID-19 pandemic on television in the United States provided a major exception, with NBC importing the CTV medical drama Transplant (which premiered at midseason in Canada) for its fall primetime lineup, filling the timeslot normally filled by its own medical drama New Amsterdam (whose premiere was deferred to 2021). NBC subsequently picked up another Canadian medical drama from Global, Nurses, and acquired the second season of Transplant for a mid-season premiere in 2022. The third season would also be picked up by NBC, airing in its 2023 fall lineup as replacement programming due to the WGA and SAG–AFTRA strikes.

==== Children's programming ====
Canadian studios have had a significant presence in the children's television market. The Toronto-based studio Nelvana has had interests in both children's television and publishing, and was acquired by Canadian broadcaster Corus Entertainment in 2000. Nelvana took advantage of U.S. mandates for educational programming by selling a number of series to American broadcasters such as CBS (with many of them being adaptations of children's books), and partnering with NBC Universal, Ion Media, Scholastic, and Classic Media on their children's television joint venture Qubo.

The Montreal-based studio CINAR was well known for producing and distributing animated series with tie-ins for the educational market, such as Arthur—which was distributed on U.S. public television by Boston's PBS station WGBH. The company collapsed in 2001 following an accounting scandal, and had also faced allegations that it paid American writers to write for its shows under the names of Canadian citizens, while continuing to accept Canadian federal tax credits. The company was later purchased in 2004 by former Nelvana executives, and renamed Cookie Jar Group. The company was in turn acquired by Halifax-based DHX Media (now WildBrain) in 2012, which made it the largest independent owner of children's television content in the world.

== Trans-Pacific Partnership ==
There is concern about the Trans-Pacific Partnership Intellectual Property Provisions of the TPP in terms of CanCon. In October 2012, Canada formally became a TPP negotiating participant. In order to enter into the TPP agreement, Canada had to accept the terms agreed upon by the nine original signatory countries: Brunei, Chile, New Zealand, Singapore, Australia, Malaysia, Peru, United States, and Vietnam. According to MP Don Davies, Canada had no veto power over these terms and accepted the "existing unbracketed text, sight unseen and without input."

In September 2012, the International Intellectual Property Alliance, a U.S. private sector coalition representing over 3,200 U.S. producers and distributors of copyright protected materials, sent a submission to the U.S. Trade Representative's office requesting that the Trans-Pacific Partnership (TPP) agreement "be comprehensive in scope, strictly avoiding any sectoral carveouts that preclude the application of free trade disciplines. We note that several market access barriers [in] Canada involve, for example, content quota requirements for television, radio, cable television, direct-to-home broadcast services, specialty television, and satellite radio services."

After the replacement of the TPP with the Comprehensive and Progressive Agreement for Trans-Pacific Partnership in 2018, it was reported that Canada had secured an exemption from a clause in the agreement that prohibits discriminatory rules on foreign audio-video services in order to ask services to financially support the creation of Canadian content.

== Theatre ==
In 1971, a group of Canadian playwrights issued the Gaspé Manifesto as a call for at least one-half of the programming at publicly subsidized theatres to be Canadian content. The numerical goal was not achieved, but the following years saw an increase in Canadian content stage productions.

== Reception ==
Bryan Adams has been critical of the requirements. During a press conference on January 13, 1992, Adams stated the following:

"If you go to America or England, or almost any other country in the world, they don't have those kinds of stipulations on their artists. They're rewarded on the basis of their music, not government regulation. You would never hear Elton John declared un-British. You just wouldn't. It's a disgrace. The Canadian government should get out of the music business entirely. There are a lot of artists who have been successful in Canada who can't get arrested anywhere in the world and I think it's breeding mediocrity."

University of Ottawa professor Michael Geist has criticized the current requirements for film and television production to qualify as Canadian content as being outdated, citing that its requirements being largely dependent on Canadian involvement in specific roles (such as the producer, lead actors, directors, screenwriters, and composers) has led to situations where productions filmed in Canada, using Canadian personnel and talent, or adapted from works by Canadians (such as The Handmaid's Tale) may not necessarily qualify as "Canadian content"—instead being a "foreign location and service production" (FLSP) that uses Canadian resources. Geist noted in some cases that these productions were "frequently indistinguishable" from certified Canadian content, such as All or Nothing: Toronto Maple Leafs (which was filmed by Canadian crews, narrated by Canadian actor Will Arnett, and followed a Canadian sports franchise), and films such as The Decline and Turning Red (which both include a number of Canadian actors, personnel in prominent roles, and are set in Canadian locations). He also pointed out that Gotta Love Trump—a Canadian-produced documentary on U.S. president Donald Trump—was able to receive the CAVCO certification despite featuring only one Canadian citizen in a visible role (as an interview subject).

In January 2026, media blogger James Wallace published an editorial in Broadcast Dialogue arguing that Canadian content rules for music are becoming increasingly ineffective in their current form, as they regulate the broadcast of Canadian music on radio but do little to foster the distribution and discoverability of Canadian music on streaming platforms.

== See also ==
- Canadian cultural protectionism
- Music of Canada
- Online Streaming Act
