= International Festival of Animated Objects =

- Genre: Art
- Locations: Calgary, Alberta, Canada
- Patron: Calgary Animated Objects Society
- Website: Festival of Animated Objects

The International Festival of Animated Objects is an annual festival which promotes the arts of puppetry, mask, and animated objects in downtown Calgary, Alberta, Canada. The FAO was produced by Xstine Cook as a project of the non-profit group Calgary Animated Objects Society from 2002-2016. It was formed as its own non-profit society, the International Festival of Animated Objects Society in 2015 by Xstine Cook, Bob Davis, and Peter Balkwill. It was originally produced biennially by Xstine Cook from 2002-2016, then by Gwen Murray in 2017 and 2019, and Amelia Newbert in 2021. Newbert transitioned the FAO to an annual event during the pandemic era in 2022. Cosmo Christoffersen took the helm in 2023, and is the current Managing Producer.

The FAO features high calibre local, national, and international artists working in the realm of animated objects. Programming includes live performances, screenings, lectures, workshops, exhibitions for all ages and adult audiences, including the ever-popular late night "Dolly Wiggler Cabaret".

Past programming has included Canadian marionette superstar Ronnie Burkett, The Old Trout Puppet Workshop, BC spectacle artists Three on the Tree, Tsimphisan carver Victor Reece, Cirque du Soleil artist Mooky Cornish, Phillip Huber (of "Being John Malkovich" marionette fame), Frank Meschkuleit ("Bride of Chucky", "The Left Hand of Frank"), Calgary's The Old Trout Puppet Workshop, Red Smarteez, and Czech group Buchty a Loutky, amongst others.

The March 2024 edition of the Festival of Animated Objects included programming support from a number of partner organizations: Calgary Animated Objects Society produced the Exhibitions, curated by Tia DeLauria and Claudia Chagoya, Animovies short film packages by Kes Lefthand and Kelsey Two Young Men of the Stony Nakoda AV Club, and the Dolly Wiggler Cabaret which was curated by Xstine Cook, and hosted by Xstine Cook and Mooky Cornish. WP Puppet Theatre produced the Learning Component, in concert with Sparrow Arts Society. The Canadian Academy of Mask and Puppetry produced Wunderbriefs, a series of short pop-up works, as well as a residency with Brazilian artist Nina Vogel. Seton YMCA and Shane Homes YMCA at Rocky Ridge produced Splish Splash for young audiences. The FAO was sponsored by Street Characters.

Animovies is the screening portion of the International Festival of Animated Objects. Submissions for the film portion may be made through FilmFreeway.

Supporting the IFAO are the following organizations:

- Canadian Heritage
- Human Resources Development Canada
- Alberta Lotteries
- Alberta Foundation for the Arts
- Alberta Human Resources
- Calgary Arts Development
