= Le Théâtre des Nouveaux Compagnons =

Theatre troupe from Trois-Rivières, Quebec, CA

Le Théâtre des Nouveaux Compagnons (English: The Theatre of New Companions) is a Québécois theatre troupe. They see themselves as the successors of the Compagnons de Notre-Dame. This first incarnation was created in 1920 in Trois-Rivières, Quebec, Canada.

It is the oldest French-speaking theater company in Canada. In 2020, the troupe celebrated their 100th anniversary.
