= Allen's Company of Comedians =

First professional theatre company to perform in Canada

Allen's Company of Comedians was a British-Canadian theatre company, active from 1785 until 1790. They played an important pioneer role in the history of the Theatre of Canada as the first professional theatre company to perform in Canada.

The Company was founded by the British actor Edward Allen. Previously active at the Theatre Royal, Edinburgh and within the American Company in Philadelphia, he left the United states to settle in Montreal, Lower Canada in 1778, where theatre had been banned during the French period: when Canada became British in 1763, a great interest in theatre resulted in a florourishing amateur theatre, but there was no professional theatre.

After the American Revolutionary War, Allen returned to Philadelphia in 1785 and recruited actors to form his own theatre company, with whom he returned to Canada. They became pioneers as the first professional theatre company to perform in Canada. They were followed by Joseph Quesnel's French language Les Jeunes Messieurs Canadiens (1789).

As there was no theatre playhouse in Montréal, the Allen's Company performed in a temporary locality in the assembly room of Simon Levy. Their first performance was on 16 March 1786 with a performance of She Stoops to Conquer. It was a small company, and consisted of Edward Allen and his wife, John Bentley and his spouse, William Moore and his spouse Agnes McKay, Simon Clarke and the children of the actors, notably Andrew Allen, Étienne (Stephen) Bellair and Guillaume (William) Moreau-Mechtler. They performed plays by Shakespeare and Molière as well as opera. Bellair also managed a dance school, Moreau-Mechtler a music school and Bentley a drama school. The company also toured to Quebec. They were active at least until 1790, and possibly longer.
