= Windsor Light Music Theatre =

Canadian theatrical production company

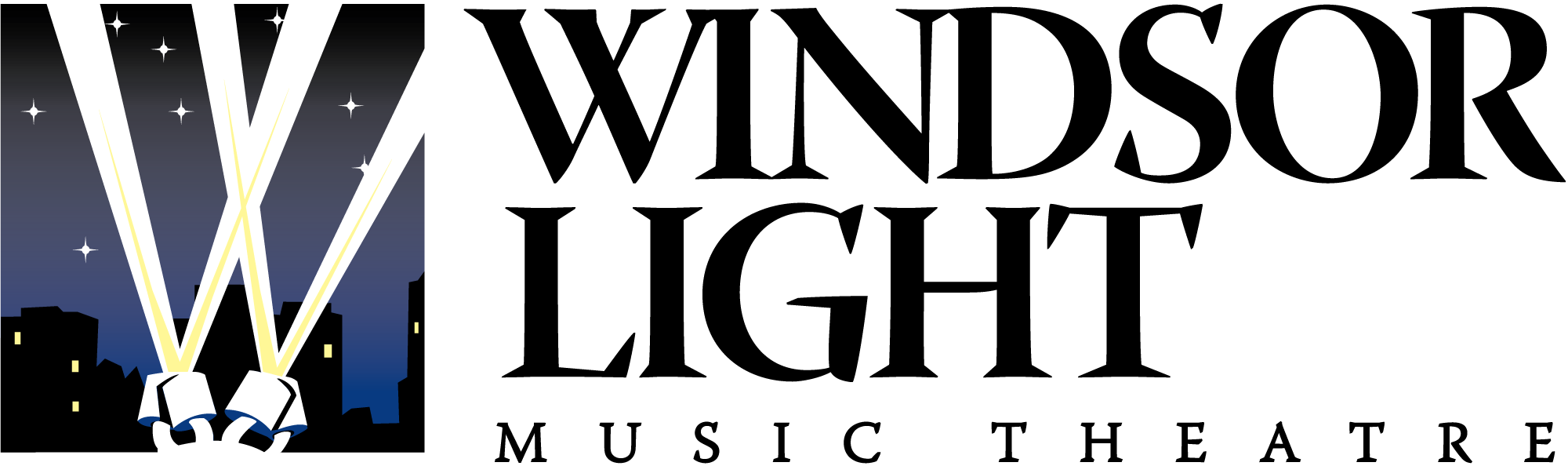
- Founded: 1949
- Founders: Dr. John H. L. Watson
- Type: Theatrical productions
- Location: Windsor, Ontario
- Website: windsorlight.com

Windsor Light Music Theatre (formerly the Windsor Light Opera Association) is an amateur musical theatre company based in Windsor, Ontario. The organization presents musical theatre productions for audiences in Windsor and Essex County. It was founded by John H. L. Watson in 1948 and staged its first production, The Pirates of Penzance, in 1949.

The company originally performed at Walkerville Collegiate Institute. Its mainstage productions are now presented at St. Clair College's Chrysler Theatre in downtown Windsor.

== History ==
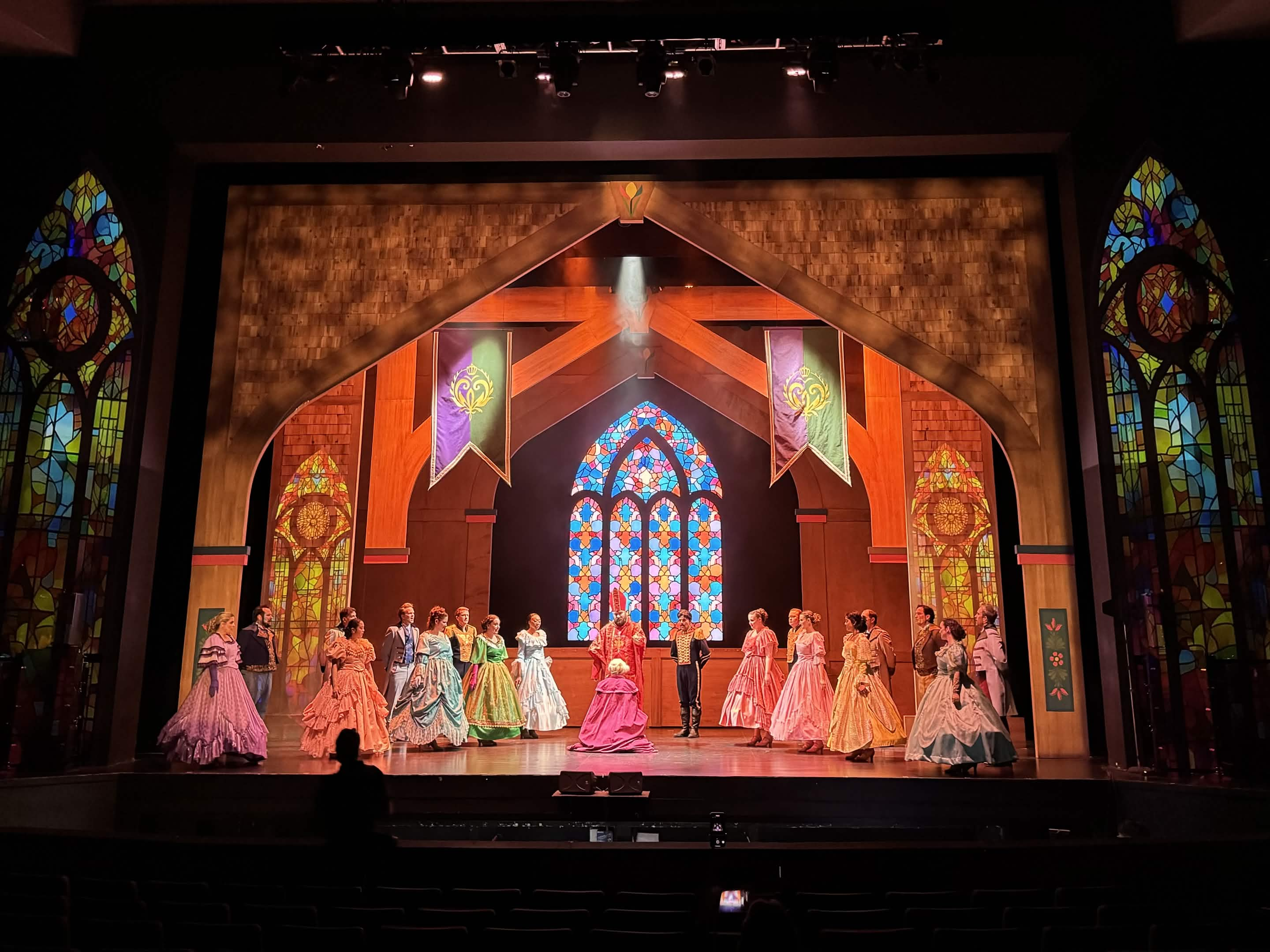
Frozen (2026)

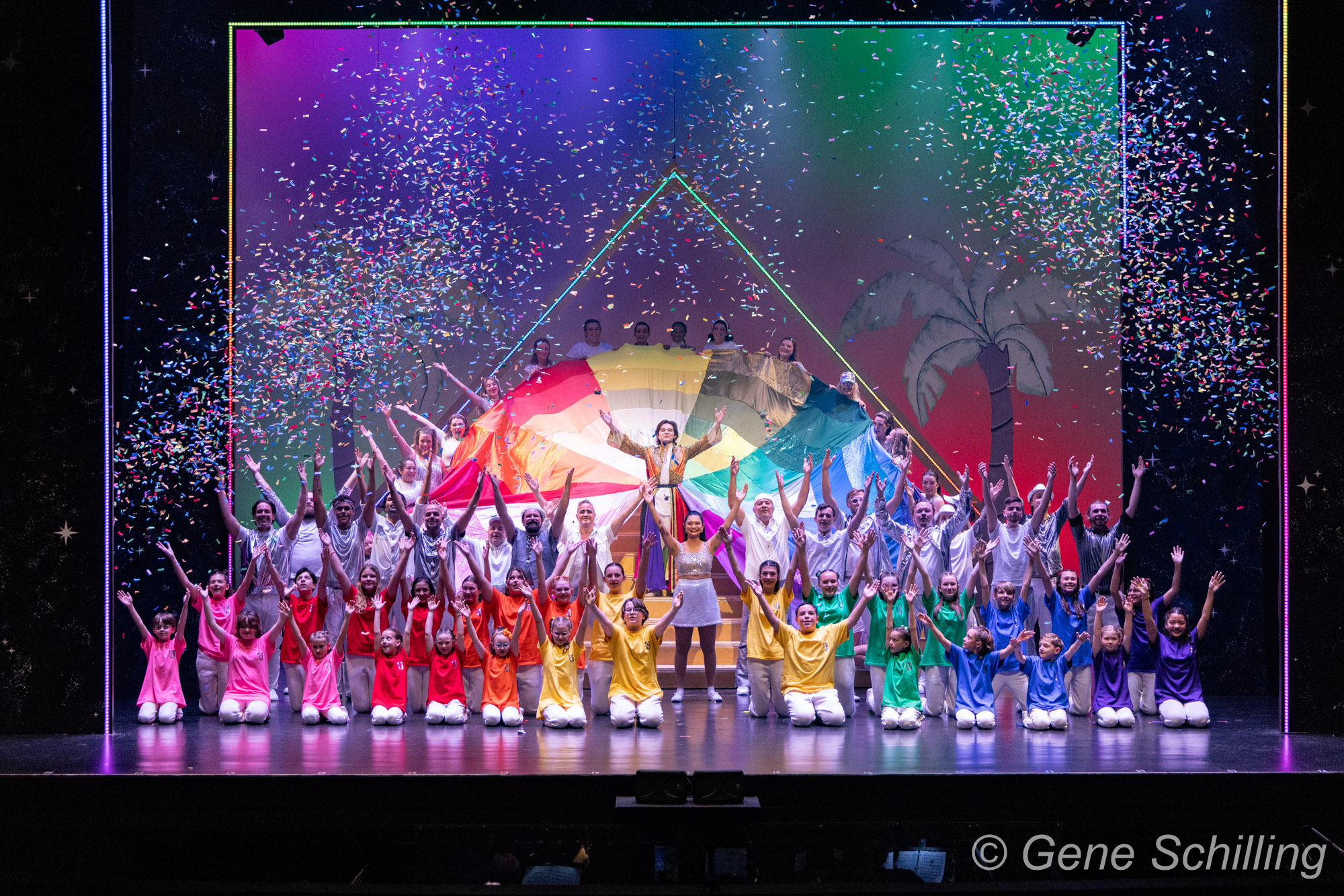
Joseph and the Amazing Technicolor Dreamcoat (2025)

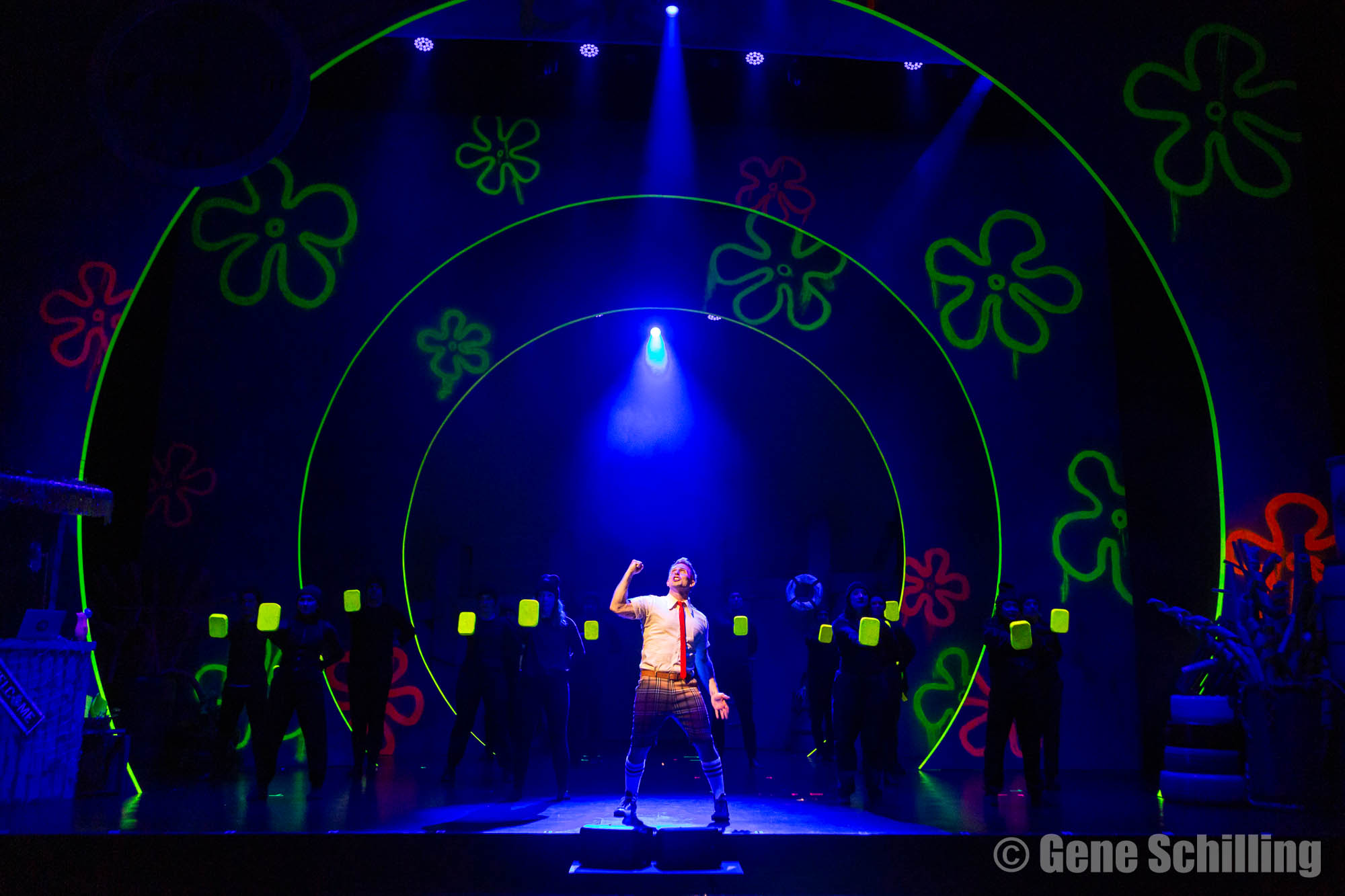
The SpongeBob Musical (2024)

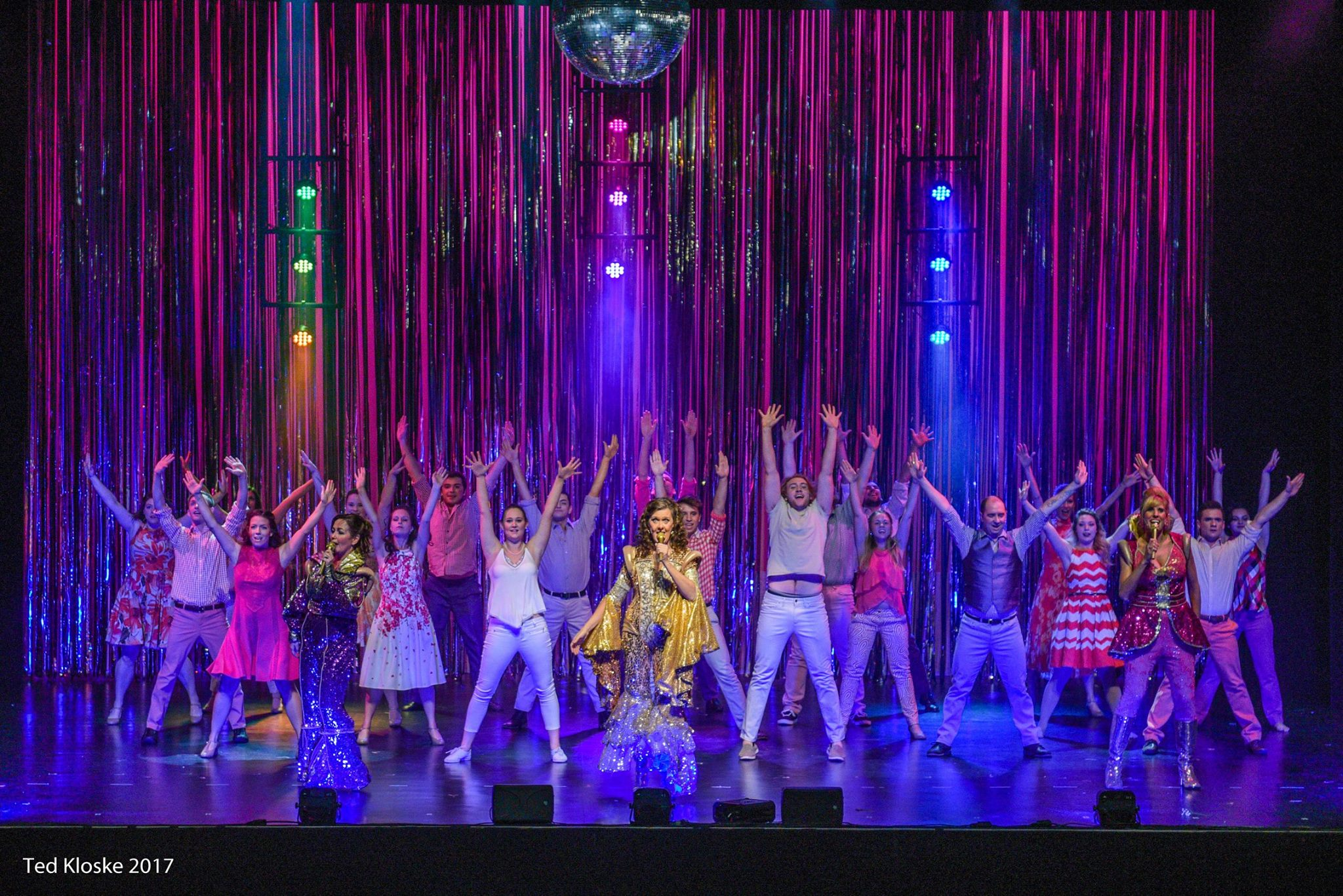
Mamma Mia (2017)

The Windsor Light Opera Association was founded in 1948 by John H. L. Watson with the goal of bringing musical theatre to the Windsor–Essex region. Its first production was The Pirates of Penzance, presented in November 1949 with a cast of 43. Following demand for the production, an additional performance was added.

During its early years, rehearsals were held at John Campbell Public School and productions were staged at Walkerville Collegiate Institute, whose auditorium had approximately 900 seats. In 1960, the company began presenting productions at the Cleary Auditorium, now known as the Chrysler Theatre.

In 1986, the organization purchased a former church on Jos St. Louis Avenue for use as a rehearsal hall, meeting space, storage facility and administrative base.

The organization initially specialized in operettas and works commonly described as light opera. As its repertoire shifted toward contemporary musical theatre, the Windsor Light Opera Association changed its name to Windsor Light Music Theatre in 2007.

== Productions and organization ==
Windsor Light Music Theatre generally presents two mainstage musical productions annually. According to the organization, its productions involve more than 300 active members working both onstage and in technical, administrative and production roles.

The company performs its mainstage productions with a live orchestra. Windsor Light Music Theatre states that local musicians, including members of the Windsor Symphony Orchestra, have participated in its orchestras and collaborative performances.

In 1998, the mayor and city council of Windsor proclaimed March 29 as Windsor Light Opera Association Day in recognition of the organization's 50th anniversary.

== Youth programs ==
Windsor Light Music Theatre operates theatre education and performance programs for children and teenagers. Its Youth Performance Program was established in 2015 and provides participants aged 10 to 17 with rehearsals and instruction led by a director, choreographer and music director, culminating in a staged musical production.

The organization also offers summer drama camps, a teen theatre showcase and the Rising Stars Musical Theatre Program. These programs include training in acting, singing, dancing, theatre interpretation and technical theatre.

== Productions ==
The following production history is based on records published by Windsor Light Music Theatre.

=== Mainstage productions ===
==== 2020s ====
- Frozen, Spring 2026
- Joseph and the Amazing Technicolor Dreamcoat, Fall 2025
- Waitress, Spring 2025
- A Christmas Story: The Musical, Fall 2024
- The SpongeBob Musical, Spring 2024
- The Sound of Music, Fall 2023
- Charlie and the Chocolate Factory, Spring 2023
- A Christmas Carol, Fall 2022
- Cinderella, Spring 2022

==== 2010s ====
- Matilda, Fall 2019
- Hairspray, Spring 2019
- Elf: The Musical, Fall 2018
- Singin' in the Rain, Spring 2018
- Mamma Mia!, Fall 2017
- Jesus Christ Superstar, Spring 2017
- Beauty and the Beast, Fall 2016
- Sister Act, Spring 2016
- The Little Mermaid, Fall 2015
- Grease, Spring 2015
- Mary Poppins, Fall 2014
- Joseph and the Amazing Technicolor Dreamcoat, Spring 2014
- The King and I, Fall 2013
- The Wizard of Oz, Spring 2013
- Monty Python's Spamalot, Fall 2012
- Legally Blonde, Spring 2012
- Into the Woods, Fall 2011
- The Drowsy Chaperone, Spring 2011
- A Christmas Carol: The Musical, Fall 2010
- Willy Wonka, Spring 2010

==== 2000s ====
- Rent, Fall 2009
- The Producers, Spring 2009
- Cabaret, Fall 2008
- Thoroughly Modern Millie, Spring 2008
- A Christmas Carol: The Musical, Fall 2007
- Miss Saigon, Spring 2007
- Damn Yankees, Fall 2006
- The Sound of Music, Spring 2006
- Beauty and the Beast, Fall 2005
- Godspell, Spring 2005
- Seussical, Fall 2004
- Gypsy, Spring 2004
- Ragtime, Fall 2003
- Joseph and the Amazing Technicolor Dreamcoat, Spring 2003
- The Scarlet Pimpernel, Fall 2002
- How to Succeed in Business Without Really Trying, Spring 2002
- Chess, Fall 2001
- The Wizard of Oz, Spring 2001
- Titanic, Fall 2000
- The Secret Garden, Spring 2000

==== 1990s ====
- Carousel, Fall 1999
- Blood Brothers, Spring 1999
- The Music Man, Fall 1998
- Fiddler on the Roof, Spring 1998
- Annie Warbucks, Fall 1997
- La Cage aux Folles, Spring 1997
- Joseph and the Amazing Technicolor Dreamcoat, Fall 1996
- The Most Happy Fella, Spring 1996
- No, No, Nanette, Fall 1995
- Guys and Dolls, Spring 1995
- Barnum, Fall 1994
- My Fair Lady, Spring 1994
- Sweeney Todd: The Demon Barber of Fleet Street, Fall 1993
- Oklahoma!, Spring 1993
- Man of La Mancha, Fall 1992
- Me and My Girl, Spring 1992
- Mame, Spring 1991
- Evita, Fall 1990
- The King and I, Spring 1990

==== 1980s ====
- Applause, Fall 1989
- Hello, Dolly!, Spring 1989
- H.M.S. Pinafore, Fall 1988
- Annie Get Your Gun, Spring 1988
- A Christmas Carol, Fall 1987
- Oliver!, Spring 1987
- Ruddigore, Fall 1986
- Bye Bye Birdie, Spring 1986
- Annie, Fall 1985
- Annie, Spring 1985
- Brigadoon, Fall 1984
- Kiss Me, Kate, Spring 1984
- Anne of Green Gables, Fall 1983
- Fanny, Spring 1983
- The Yeomen of the Guard, Fall 1982
- Plain and Fancy, Spring 1982
- The Pirates of Penzance, Fall 1981
- Fiddler on the Roof, Spring 1981
- The Mikado, Fall 1980
- The Music Man, Spring 1980

==== 1970s ====
- Gigi, Fall 1979
- Kismet, Spring 1979
- South Pacific, Fall 1978
- Finian's Rainbow, Spring 1978
- The Stingiest Man in Town, Fall 1977
- New Girl in Town, Spring 1977
- The Red Mill, Fall 1976
- Camelot, Spring 1976
- Damn Yankees, Fall 1975
- The Most Happy Fella, Spring 1975
- Fiddler on the Roof, Fall 1974
- My Fair Lady, Spring 1974
- Cabaret, Fall 1973
- Tenderloin, Spring 1973
- Baker Street, Fall 1972
- Hello, Dolly!, Spring 1972
- A Christmas Carol, Fall 1971
- Bitter Sweet, Spring 1971
- Bye Bye Birdie, Fall 1970
- The Music Man, Spring 1970

==== 1960s ====
- My Fair Lady, Fall 1969
- Patience, Spring 1969
- Guys and Dolls, Fall 1968
- The Sound of Music, Spring 1968
- H.M.S. Pinafore, Fall 1967
- Fanny, Spring 1967
- The Chocolate Soldier, Fall 1966
- Oliver!, Spring 1966
- She Loves Me, Fall 1965
- Camelot, Spring 1965
- South Pacific, Fall 1964
- The King and I, Spring 1964
- Oklahoma!, Fall 1963
- The Most Happy Fella, Spring 1963
- The Student Prince, Fall 1962
- Show Boat, Spring 1962
- The Gondoliers, Fall 1961
- Kismet, Spring 1961
- Brigadoon, Fall 1960
- South Pacific, Spring 1960

==== 1950s and 1940s ====
- The Arcadians, Fall 1959
- The Mikado, Spring 1959
- Oklahoma!, Fall 1958
- Carousel, Spring 1958
- The Gypsy Baron, Fall 1957
- The Merry Widow, Spring 1957
- Kiss Me, Kate, Fall 1956
- Finian's Rainbow, Spring 1956
- Brigadoon, Fall 1955
- Rio Rita, Spring 1955
- The Red Mill, Fall 1954
- Mlle. Modiste, Spring 1954
- Floradora, Fall 1953
- Ruddigore, Spring 1953
- The Gondoliers, Fall 1952
- Iolanthe, Spring 1952
- The Mikado, Fall 1951
- Patience, Spring 1951
- H.M.S. Pinafore, Fall 1950
- The Yeomen of the Guard, Spring 1950
- The Pirates of Penzance, Fall 1949

=== Youth productions ===
==== 2020s ====
- Newsies Jr., Youth 2026
- The Little Mermaid Jr., Youth 2025
- High School Musical Jr., Youth 2024
- Beauty and the Beast Jr., Youth 2023

==== 2010s ====
- The Lion King Jr., Youth 2019
- Peter Pan Jr., Youth 2018
- Aladdin Jr., Youth 2017

== Most frequently produced shows ==
Most frequently produced shows
Production	Number of productions
A Christmas Carol	5
Joseph and the Amazing Technicolor Dreamcoat	4
Brigadoon	3
Fiddler on the Roof	3
H.M.S. Pinafore	3
The King and I	3
The Mikado	3
The Most Happy Fella	3
The Music Man	3
My Fair Lady	3
Oklahoma!	3
South Pacific	3
The Sound of Music	3
