= Puente Theatre =

- Formation: 1988
- Type: Theatre group
- Location: Victoria, British Columbia, Canada
- Artistic director: Mercedes Bátiz-Benét
- Website: www.puentetheatre.ca

Puente Theatre is a theatre company based in Victoria, British Columbia, founded in 1988 by Chilean artist Lina de Guevara. It is among the earliest Latinx-led theatre companies established in Canada. Originally focused on Latinx voices and experiences, the company later expanded its programming to include work by and about immigrants, newcomers, and equity-seeking communities.

== History ==
Puente Theatre was founded in 1988 by Lina de Guevara, who served as artistic director until 2011, when Mercedes Bátiz-Benét succeeded her. According to the Canada Council for the Arts, the company’s work highlights the experiences of immigrants and newcomers in Canada. Puente has been featured in Living in Victoria as a notable arts institution in the city.

== Productions ==
Selected productions include:

- I Wasn’t Born Here (1988), the company’s inaugural production exploring immigrant identity.
- Of Roots and Racism (1995), an educational project addressing racism in schools.
- Emergence (2007), a multidisciplinary work by Kwakwakaʼwakw poet Krystal Cook.
- El Jinete: A Mariachi Opera (2014), written and directed by Mercedes Bátiz-Benét, presented at the SummerWorks Performance Festival in Toronto; she received the Canadian Stage Award for Direction.
- Gruff (2014), a musical co-written by Mercedes Bátiz-Benét and Judd Palmer, produced by Puente Theatre and later published by Bayeux Arts.
- Lieutenant Nun (2015, with SNAFU Dance Theatre), dramaturged and directed by Mercedes Bátiz-Benét; recipient of multiple Victoria Fringe Awards.
- Fado: The Saddest Music in the World (2018–19, revived 2023 with the Firehall Arts Centre), directed by Mercedes Bátiz-Benét; winner of the JAYMAC Outstanding Production Award.
- The Party (2020), written and directed by Mercedes Bátiz-Benét, commissioned by the National Arts Centre as part of its Grand Acts of Theatre program.
- Blood Wedding: The Forest Remembers (2025), an adaptation of Federico García Lorca’s Blood Wedding, written and directed by Mercedes Bátiz-Benét, presented as the flagship production of the inaugural Great Works Theatre Festival.

== Festivals and initiatives ==
- Great Works Theatre Festival (2025–present), a summer repertory festival co-produced with Blue Bridge Repertory Theatre.
- WORLDPLAY (1999–2020), an annual festival of staged readings of international plays at the Belfry Theatre.
- WORKPLAY (2008–present), a residency for emerging playwrights developing scripts about identity.
- Bridging the Gap, a residency for established IBPoC female and gender-diverse playwrights.
- conVERGE Residency and Mentorship Program (launched 2018), an annual mentorship initiative for IBPoC artists that received the 2021 CRD Community Impact Award.

== Recognition and archives ==
Puente Theatre is listed in the CanadianTheatre.com directory of theatre companies in Canada. Its archival records are held at the University of Victoria Libraries Special Collections. The company was profiled in the Canada Council for the Arts’ *Artist Stories* series.
