= Calgary Animated Objects Society =

Canadian non-profit arts organization

- Founded: 2003; Calgary, Alberta, Canada
- Founder: Xstine Cook
- Type: Non-governmental organization
- Purpose: Art
- Headquarters: 1030 20 Avenue SE; Calgary, Alberta; T2G 1M6
- Website: www.animatedobjects.ca

Calgary Animated Objects Society (CAOS) is a non-profit charitable arts organization based in Calgary, Alberta, Canada.

CAOS is dedicated to creative expression through the arts of mask, puppetry, and object animation, inspiring people of all backgrounds to discover and articulate their stories.

By amplifying voices through acts of radical creativity, CAOS exists to connect people and communities to each other and our world.

CAOS evolves and advances the art of mask, puppetry, and animated objects by teaching and providing educational activities, presenting live performances, and creating multi-disciplinary art works and films. We present in schools, senior homes, at festivals, and events around Calgary and area.

== History ==
Founded in 2003 by multi-disciplinary artist Xstine Cook, CAOS is dedicated to the arts of mask, puppetry and animated objects, as well as building community through radical acts of creativity.

CAOS's major projects include animated films, Lilly in the Lab Augmented Reality app, Disinformation Warriors, the annual International Festival of Animated Objects, and "Spirit of White Buffalo" - a large-scale animated puppet and arts residency.

== Origins and Goals ==
CAOS provides artistic opportunities through its activities, and initiates youth and community activities. these include: Young Spirit Voices, an aboriginal youth drama project, the Ramsay "Halloween Scream" and "The Great Ramsay Kinetic Sculpture Race".

CAOS is led by founder Xstine Cook, a mask and puppet artist, who ran the Green Fools Theatre for 13 years prior to founding CAOS. Xstine trained at the Dell'Arte International School of Physical Theatre in Blue Lake, California.

CAOS and the festival propel a very active local mask and puppetry tradition into an international arena, all the while bringing international attention to the city of Calgary. Extensive coverage for the organization can be found in FFWD magazine-Calgary's weekly arts & culture publication: "Calgary is a hotbed of original, unorthodox puppet work" (quote from an article written to cover CAOS's festival).

== Spirit of White Buffalo ==
CAOS also produces original art works, such as Spirit of White Buffalo. Guided by Cook, this giant kinetic sculpture was built by incarcerated men in Drumheller Institution, in collaboration with local artists, Jeff De Boer, and youth. "Spirit of White Buffalo" appeared at the 2007 Calgary Stampede Parade, and was awarded first place in "Best Western Theme".

== Media coverage and recognition ==
The organization has received coverage from news outlets including but not limited to the CBC, Calgary Herald, CTV and The Gauntlet, and numerous community-level publications.

Calgary Animated Objects Society has received national coverage for its activities consistently since 2005. The Globe and Mail credited CAOS with "putting Calgary in the pop-culture vanguard" in recognition of the International Festival of Animated Objects' programming, and the same article also drew attention to how "Calgary...has become one of the most fertile spots in North America for ground-breaking puppetry".

CAOS's Artistic Director was awarded the "Innovative Business Practices Award" from the Rozsa Foundation for Arts Management in 2007, The City of Calgary Arts Award in 2022, and Queen Elizabeth II Platinum Jubilee Medal in 2022.
