= The Old Trout Puppet Workshop =

The Old Trout Puppet Workshop is a puppet theatre company, founded on a ranch in southern Alberta in 1999. The company's first year of operation was an experience of intense collaborative isolation – the Trouts lived together, cooked together, and worked together. They collected eggs, fed the pigs, and premiered their first show to a bunkhouse full of cowboys and Hutterites. A year later, they moved to Calgary, having exhausted the joys of living in a coal-heated shack. The Trouts now travel the world, performing at festivals that celebrate the art of the extraordinary.

The Old Trout Puppet Workshop is dedicated to making professional puppet theatre, for both children and adults, that blurs that distinction. The Trouts explore the outer edges of the puppet medium, and create original, unique, and exuberant art. An Old Trout show strives for delightful allegory, joyful tragedy, and purity of spirit.

The company has written, designed, built and performed the following plays: Ignorance, The Erotic Anguish of Don Juan, Famous Puppet Death Scenes, The Unlikely Birth of Istvan, Beowulf, The Tooth Fairy, The Last Supper of Antonin Careme, Pinocchio, The Ice King and their most recent show Jabberwocky.

Filmography includes Comedia Moderna, for Canada's cinematic underground, funded in part by the Bravo television network.

The Feist video Honey, Honey features the work of the Old Trouts.

Founding members are Judd Palmer, Peter Balkwill and Steve Kenderes.
